= Woodward Stakes top three finishers =

This is a listing of the horses that finished in either first, second, or third place and the number of starters in the Woodward Stakes, an American Grade 1 race for three-year-olds and up, at 1-1/8 miles on dirt held at Saratoga Race Course in Saratoga Springs, New York. Runners who were subsequently named the American Horse of the Year are indicated in bold. (List 1972–present)

Year	Winner	Second	Third	Starters
2022	Life Is Good	Law Professor	Keepmeinmind	4
2021	Art Collector	Maxfield	Dr Post	6
2020	Global Champaign	Tacitus	Prioritize	5
2019	Preservationist	Hal Harbour	Yoshida	8
2018	Yoshida	Gunnevera	Leofric	14
2017	Gun Runner	Rally Cry	Neolithic	5
2016	Shaman Ghost	Mubtaahij	Frosted	9
2015	Liam's Map	Coach Inge	Wicked Strong	8
2014	Itsmyluckyday	Moreno	Prayer For Relief	9
2013	Alpha	Flat Out	Successful Dan	5
2012	To Honor and Serve	Mucho Macho Man	Cease	7
2011	**Havre de Grace** ‡	Flat Out	Rule	8
2010	Quality Road	Mythical Power	Tranquil Manner	7
2009	**Rachel Alexandra ‡**	Macho Again	Bullsbay	8
2008	**Curlin**	Past the Point	Wanderin Boy	7
2007	Lawyer Ron	Sun King	Diamond Stripes	8
2006	Premium Tap	Second of June	Sun King	10
2005	**Saint Liam**	Sir Shackleton	Commentator	5
2004	**Ghostzapper**	Saint Liam	Bowman's Band	7
2003	**Mineshaft**	Hold That Tiger	Puzzlement	5
2002	Lido Palace	Gander	Express Tour	6
2001	Lido Palace	Albert the Great	Tiznow	5
2000	Lemon Drop Kid	Behrens	Gander	5
1999	River Keen	Almutawakel	Stephen Got Even	7
1998	**Skip Away**	Gentlemen	Running Stag	5
1997	Formal Gold	**Skip Away**	Will's Way	5
1996	**Cigar**	L'Carriere	Golden Larch	5
1995	**Cigar**	Star Standard	Golden Larch	5
1994	**Holy Bull**	Devil His Due	Colonial Affair	8
1993	Bertrando	Devil His Due	Valley Crossing	6
1992	Sultry Song	Pleasant Tap	Out of Place	8
1991	In Excess	Farma Way	Festin	6
1990	Dispersal	Quiet American	Rhythm	8
1989	Easy Goer	Its Academic	Forever Silver	5
1988	**Alysheba**	Forty Niner	Waquoit	8
1987	Polish Navy	Gulch	Creme Fraiche	9
1986	Precisionist	**Lady's Secret** ‡	Personal Flag	5
1985	Track Barron	Vanlandingham	Chief's Crown	6
1984	Slew o' Gold	Shifty Sheik	Bet Big	6
1983	Slew o' Gold	Bates Motel	Sing Sing	10
1982	Island Whirl	Silver Buck	Silver Supreme	7
1981	Pleasant Colony	Amber Pass	Herb Water	9
1980	**Spectacular Bid**	none	none	1
1979	**Affirmed**	Coastal	Czaravich	5
1978	Seattle Slew	Exceller	It's Freezing	5
1977	Forego	Silver Series	Great Contractor	10
1976	**Forego**	Dance Spell	Honest Pleasure	10
1975	**Forego**	Wajima	Group Plan	6
1974	**Forego**	Arbees Boy	Group Plan	11
1973	Prove Out	**Secretariat**	Cougar II	5
1972	Key to the Mint	Autobiography	Summer Guest ‡	5

A ‡ designates a Filly or Mare
