= Jack Dreyfus =

American businessman

- Born: August 28, 1913; Montgomery, Alabama, U.S.
- Died: March 27, 2009 (aged 95); Manhattan, New York, U.S.
- Education: Lehigh University
- Occupation: Stockbroker
- Known for: Mutual fund pioneer
- Board member of: Dreyfus Corporation, NYRA
- Spouse: Joan Personette
- Children: John
- Parent(s): Ida Lewis & Jonas Dreyfus
- Awards: Eclipse Award of Merit (1976)

John J. Dreyfus Jr. (August 28, 1913 – March 27, 2009) was an American financial expert and the founder of the Dreyfus Funds.

== Biography ==
Born to a Jewish family in Montgomery, Alabama, Dreyfus was a graduate of Lehigh University in Pennsylvania. His paternal grandfather was a first cousin of Alfred Dreyfus, the protagonist of the notorious 19th-century French antisemitic scandal known as the Dreyfus affair.

Dreyfus is widely regarded as the man who "invented" the commonplace mutual fund through direct marketing to the public. His early television commercials featuring a lion emerging from the Wall Street subway station were successful. According to Barron's Magazine end-of-century issue, Jack Dreyfus was considered the 2nd most significant money manager of the last century.

Dreyfus married in 1939 Joan Personette, from whom he was divorced; they had one child, John (Jonny).

Dreyfus became something of a public activist and proponent for the use of Phenytoin, an anticonvulsant, for the treatment of several mental health disorders; Dreyfus was not a doctor but claimed that the drug, which was prescribed to him in 1966, had alleviated his depression and chronic anxiety; after this, Dreyfus became a very vocal proponent for the research and clinical use of Phenytoin in these and other mental health diseases. He authored a book titled A Remarkable Medicine Has Been Overlooked which he published and distributed with his own money (spending up to US$70 million) and had the book sent for free to hundreds of doctors.

In his role as a Phenytoin proponent, Dreyfus is known to have recommended the drug to Richard Nixon and it has also been said that on at least two occasions Dreyfus provided thousands of Phenytoin pills to him during his presidency to be used as a sedative and antidepressant after Dreyfus profusely praised the drug while he dined in Bebe Rebozo's compound with Nixon who, intrigued, supposedly asked Dreyfus for the drug, who complied. This is a claim that was most prominently raised by Irish journalist Anthony Summers who published an unauthorized biography of Nixon titled Arrogance of Power: The Secret World of Richard Nixon in 2001 in which he raised these allegations; however, claims that Nixon consumed Phenytoin while in office have been fiercely disputed by historians and former colleagues of Nixon.

Jack Dreyfus wrote and published his autobiography titled The Two Lives of Jack Dreyfus--The Lion of Wall Street (1995). He was a proponent of Phenytoin all his life and he also had his autobiography bound together with his previous work, A Remarkable Medicine Has Been Overlooked.

Dreyfus died on March 27, 2009.

== Hobeau Farm ==
Dreyfus established the noted Hobeau Farm in Ocala, Florida, in the early 1960s where he bred, trained and raced Thoroughbred racehorses. The 2,200-acre (8.9 km^{2}) property was the center of his racing operation. In 1962, Dreyfus hired Hall of Fame thoroughbred trainer Allen Jerkens as head trainer. He sold the property (reduced to 1,830 acres) in February 2005 for $12,750,000

Jack Dreyfus was Chairman of the New York Racing Association. He was voted the 1976 Eclipse Award of Merit, Thoroughbred racing's highest honor presented to an individual or entity displaying outstanding lifetime achievement in, and service to, the Thoroughbred industry.

Among his noted horses and victories were Beau Purple, which defeated Kelso in the Man o' War Stakes at Belmont Park in October 1962; Handsome Boy, which defeated Buckpasser in the Brooklyn Handicap in July 1967; Blessing Angelica, which won the Delaware Handicap in 1971 and 1972; Onion, which defeated Secretariat in the Whitney Stakes in August 1973; and Prove Out, which defeated Secretariat in the Woodward Stakes in September 1973.

Hobeau Farm would continue to see success until Dreyfus' passing and onwards.
