= Discovery Stakes =

- Class: Listed
- Location: Aqueduct Racetrack, Queens, New York, United States
- Inaugurated: 1945
- Race type: Thoroughbred – Flat racing
- Website: www.nyra.com/index_aqueduct.html

Race information
- Distance: 1 1/8 miles (9 furlongs)
- Surface: Dirt
- Track: left-handed
- Qualification: Three-year-olds
- Weight: Assigned
- Purse: US$150,000 (2021)

The Discovery Stakes is an American Thoroughbred horse race held annually during the latter part of November at Aqueduct Racetrack in Queens, New York. A Listed event open to three-year-old horses, it is contested on dirt over a distance of one and one eighth miles (nine furlongs).

In its 72nd running in 2016, the race honors the great thoroughbred Discovery, the 1935 American Horse of the Year owned and raced by Alfred G. Vanderbilt II. In the list of the top 100 U.S. thoroughbred champions of the 20th Century by Blood-Horse magazine, Discovery ranks 37th.

Based at Aqueduct, the Discovery Handicap was inaugurated at Belmont Park where it was run from 1945–1958, and again in 1960–1961, 1968–1970. In one year, 1974, the race was run in two divisions. In 2005 it was contested at a distance of a mile and one sixteenth. The largest winning margin was 9 1/4 lengths.

== Records ==
Speed record (at 1 1/8 miles):

- 1:47 1/5 – Forego (1973)
- 1:47.30 – Left Bank (2000)

Most wins by a jockey:

- 5 – Ángel Cordero Jr. (1974 (2×), 1979, 1980, 1988)
- 5 – John Velazquez (1999, 2000, 2005, 2006, 2007)
- 5 – Joel Rosario (2012, 2016, 2017, 2018, 2019)

Most wins by a trainer:

- 6 – Todd A. Pletcher (1998, 2000, 2005, 2006, 2015, 2023)

Most wins by an owner:

- 3 – Harbor View Farm (1964, 1965, 1974)

== Winners ==
Year	Winner	Jockey	Trainer	Owner	Time
2025	Rated by Merit	Manuel Franco	Chad C. Brown	St. Elias Stable	1:33.45
2024	Generous Tipper	Kendrick Carmouche	Kenneth G. McPeek	Walking L Thoroughbreds LLC	1:50.05
2023	Crupi	Kendrick Carmouche	Todd A. Pletcher	Repole Stable & St. Elias Stable	1:51.60
2022	Eloquist	Paco Lopez	Robert E. Reid Jr.	Cash Is King LLC & LC Racing	1:53.33
2021	Miles D	Manuel Franco	Chad C. Brown	Peter M. Brant, Robert V. LaPenta	1:52.44
2020	Forza Di Oro	Junior Alvarado	Wiliam I. Mott	Don Alberto Stable	1:50.03
2019	Performer	Joel Rosario	Claude R. McGaughey III	Phipps Stable	1:50.36
2018	Plainsman	Joel Rosario	Brad H. Cox	Shortleaf Stable	1:52.14
2017	Control Group	Joel Rosario	Rudy R. Rodriguez	Michael Dubb & David Simon	1:52.83
2016	Sticksstatelydude	Joel Rosario	Kiaran P. McLaughlin	A. Haynes, J. Ferris, Pack Pride Racing, M. Haynes & B. Ward	1:50.58
2015	Tommy Macho	Javier Castellano	Todd A. Pletcher	Paul Pompa Jr. & All American Horses	1:51.67
2014	Protonico	Joe Bravo	Todd Pletcher	Sumaya U.S. Stable	1:51.92
2013	Romansh	José Ortiz	Thomas Albertrani	Godolphin Racing	1:48.28
2012	Called to Serve	Joel Rosario	Nick Canani	Marc C. Ferrell	1:49.77
2011	Redeemed	Edgar Prado	Rick Dutrow Jr.	Jay Em Ess Stable	1:49.22
2010	Stormy's Majesty	Edgar Prado	Domenic Galluscio	Majesty Stud	1:50.02
2009	Haynesfield	Ramon Domínguez	Steven M. Asmussen	Turtle Bird Stable	1:50.10
2008	Wishful Tomcat	Ramon Domínguez	Gary C. Contessa	Winter Park Partners	1:53.28
2007	Now a Victor	John Velazquez	Michael Trombetta	Three Diamonds Farm	1:50.15
2006	Roman Dynasty	John Velazquez	Todd A. Pletcher	Allen E. Paulson Trust	1:51.11
2005	Magna Graduate	John Velazquez	Todd A. Pletcher	Elisabeth Alexander	1:41.35
2004	Zakocity	Javier Castellano	Patrick L. Reynolds	Paul Pompa Jr.	1:49.78
2003	During	José A. Santos	Bob Baffert	James McIngvale	1:51.18
2002	Saint Marden	Jerry D. Bailey	Michael R. Matz	Martin S. Schwartz & Dennis Drazin	1:49.13
2001	Evening Attire	Shaun Bridgmohan	Patrick J. Kelly	Mary Grant	1:48.62
2000	Left Bank	John Velazquez	Todd A. Pletcher	Michael B. Tabor	1:47.30
1999	Adonis	John Velazquez	Nick Zito	Paraneck Stable	1:50.11
1998	Early Warning	Jorge F. Chavez	Todd A. Pletcher	Dogwood Stable	1:48.94
1997	Mr. Sinatra	Mike E. Smith	Gasper Moschera	Barbara J. Davis	1:49.55
1996	Gold Fever	Mike E. Smith	Claude R. McGaughey III	Cynthia Phipps	1:49.01
1995	Michael's Star	Julie Krone	Guadalupe Preciado	William Wheeler	1:50.34
1994	Serious Spender	Jorge F. Chavez	Dominick A. Schettino	John Caputo	1:51.24
1993	Prospector's Flag	Jorge F. Chavez	Nick Zito	Akindale Farm	1:52.30
1992	New Deal	Robbie Davis	William Badgett, Jr	Greentree Stable	1:48.08
1991	Upon My Soul	Jean-Luc Samyn	Richard Violette Jr.	Alfred G. Vanderbilt II	1:49.60
1990	Sports View	José A. Santos	D. Wayne Lukas	Edward A. Cox Jr.	1:48.60
1989	Tricky Creek	Craig Perret	George R. Arnold III	Ashbrook Farm	1:50.00
1988	Dynaformer	Ángel Cordero Jr.	D. Wayne Lukas	H. Joseph Allen	1:50.00
1987	Parochial	Julie Krone	Robert Klesaris	Glenn E. Lane	1:51.20
1986	Moment of Hope	Mike Venezia	Bob Dunham	Four Fifths Stable	1:49.60
1985	Proud Truth	Jorge Velásquez	John M. Veitch	Darby Dan Farms	1:49.20
1984	Key to the Moon	Dan Beckon	Gil Rowntree	Bahnam K. Yousif	1:50.00
1983	Country Pine	Jerry D. Bailey	Thomas L. Rondinello	Daniel M. Galbreath	1:49.60
1982	Trenchant	Jean-Luc Samyn	Philip G. Johnson	Meadowhill	1:50.80
1981	Princelet	Eddie Maple	John P. Campo	John P. Campo	1:51.00
1980	Fappiano	Ángel Cordero Jr.	Jan H. Nerud	John A. Nerud	1:50.00
1979	Belle's Gold	Ángel Cordero Jr.	Walter A. Kelley	John R. Murrell	1:48.00
1978	Sorry Lookin	Roger Velez	Pete D. Anderson	Pete D. Anderson	1:49.60
1977	Cox's Ridge	Eddie Maple	Joseph B. Cantey	Loblolly Stable	1:48.60
1976	Wise Philip	Daryl Montoya	William Boland	Ruth E. Streit	1:48.60
1975	Dr. Emil	Braulio Baeza	William F. Schmitt	Herbert Kaufman	1:48.60
1974	Rube the Great	Ángel Cordero Jr.	Pancho Martin	Sigmund Sommer	1:48.20
1974	Green Gambados	Ángel Cordero Jr.	Laz Barrera	Harbor View Farm	1:48.20
1973	Forego	Heliodoro Gustines	Eddie Hayward	Lazy F Ranch	1:47.20
1972	Forage	Eddie Maple	James W. Maloney	William Haggin Perry	1:48.60
1971	Autobiography	Laffit Pincay Jr.	Pancho Martin	Sigmund Sommer	1:50.40
1970	Burd Alane	Jorge Velásquez	Victor J. Nickerson	Watermill Farm	1:47.40
1969	Hydrologist	Doug Thomas	Roger Laurin	Meadow Stable	1:47.60
1968	Ardoise	Eddie Belmonte	Angel Penna Sr.	Gustave Ring	1:49.20
1967	Bold Hour	Bill Shoemaker	Bert Mulholland	George D. Widener Jr.	1:48.60
1966	Deck Hand †	Bill Shoemaker	Scotty Schulhofer	John M. Schiff	1:49.60
1965	Sammyren	Heliodoro Gustines	Burley Parke	Harbor View Farm	1:49.00
1964	Roman Brother	Fernando Alvarez	Burley Parke	Harbor View Farm	1:49.00
1963	Quest Link	Bill Shoemaker	Robert D. Wingfield	William Radkovich	1:49.80
1962	Comic	Larry Adams	James E. Fitzsimmons	Ogden Phipps	1:48.60
1961	Ambiopoise	Bill Shoemaker	Thomas M. Waller	Robert Lehman	1:48.80
1960	Kelso	Eddie Arcaro	Carl Hanford	Bohemia Stable	1:48.40
1959	Middle Brother	Eddie Arcaro	E. Barry Ryan	Mrs. E. Barry Ryan	1:50.60
1958	Warhead	Eddie Arcaro	Kay Erik Jensen	Mrs. Mabel C. Scholtz	1:51.20
1957	Ben Lomand	Eddie Arcaro	James E. Ryan	Esther du Pont Thouron	1:49.20
1956	Reneged	Ismael Valenzuela	Homer C. Pardue	Woodley Lane Farm	1:48.20
1955	Westward Ho	Conn McCreary	not found	Breckinridge Long	1:52.80
1954	Chevation	Eric Guerin	Richard E. Handlen	Foxcatcher Farm	1:50.00
1953	Level Lea	Bennie Green	James E. Fitzsimmons	John S. Phipps	1:52.00
1952	Ancestor	Ted Atkinson	James E. Fitzsimmons	Ogden Phipps	1:50.80
1951	Alerted	Ovie Scurlock	Jimmy Penrod	Hampton Stable	1:50.40
1950	Sunglow	Douglas Dodson	Preston M. Burch	Brookmeade Stable	1:49.00
1949	Prophets Thumb	Dave Gorman	Max Hirsch	King Ranch	1:52.20
1948	Better Self	Dave Gorman	Max Hirsch	King Ranch	1:53.80
1947	Cosmic Bomb	Ovie Scurlock	Willie Booth	William G. Helis Sr.	1:51.20
1946	Mighty Story	Basil James	Burley Parke	John Marsch	1:51.80
1945	War Jeep	Arnold Kirkland	Tom Smith	Maine Chance Farm	1:51.40

* † In 1966, Ring Twice finished first, but was disqualified.
