= Left Bank (horse) =

American-bred Thoroughbred racehorse

- Sire: French Deputy
- Grandsire: Deputy Minister
- Dam: Marshesseaux
- Damsire: Dr. Blum
- Sex: Stallion
- Foaled: 1997
- Country: United States
- Colour: Chestnut
- Breeder: John Youngblood & Fletcher Gray
- Owner: Michael B. Tabor
- Trainer: Todd A. Pletcher
- Record: 24: 14-2-0
- Earnings: US$1,402,806

Major wins
- Discovery Handicap (2000); Cigar Mile Handicap (2001); Vosburgh Stakes (2001); Bold Ruler Handicap (2002); Tom Fool Handicap (2002); Whitney Handicap (2002)

Awards
- American Champion Older Male Horse (2002)

Left Bank (May 9, 1997 – October 7, 2002) was an American Champion Thoroughbred racehorse.

== Background ==
Out of the mare, Marshesseaux, Left Bank was sired by Jerome Handicap winner, French Deputy, a son of Deputy Minister who was the 1981 Canadian Horse of the Year and two-time Leading sire in North America.

English horseman Michael Tabor purchased Left Bank as a two-year-old for $600,000 at a February 1999 Fasig-Tipton sale at Calder Race Course. Tabor turned him over to trainer Todd Pletcher to race in the United States. However, the colt suffered from colic that necessitated surgery which resulted in the removal of twelve feet of small intestine.

== Racing career ==
=== 2000: Three-year-old season ===
Recovered, Left Bank was able to race the following year notably winning the 2000 Discovery Handicap at New York's Aqueduct Racetrack.

=== 2001: Four-year-old season ===
At age four in 2001, Left Bank got off to a slow start but in the fall won two Grade 1 races. He first beat the betting favorite Squirtle Squirt to capture the September 22 Vosburgh Stakes at Belmont Park, clocking the second-fastest time in the race's 62-year history. Then, on November 24 at Aqueduct Racetrack, Left Bank won the Cigar Mile Handicap by defeating top-rated challengers, Graeme Hall and Red Bullet.

=== 2002 Championship year and death ===
Rested since his win in November's Cigar Mile, Left Bank began his five-year-old campaign on May 12, 2002, with a win in the Grade 3 Bold Ruler Handicap. After a poor showing in the May 27 Metropolitan Handicap, on July 4 Left Bank set a Belmont Park track record for 7/8 mi (7.0 furlongs; 1.4 km) in winning the Grade 2 Tom Fool Handicap by six and a quarter lengths. Moving up from sprint race distances, Left Bank followed his record-setting win in the Tom Fool by equaling the Saratoga Race Course track record for 1 1/8 miles (9.0 furlongs; 1.8 km) in his victory in the Grade 1 Whitney Handicap.

After his win in the Whitney, Left Bank was being prepared to run in the Woodward Stakes at Belmont Park but suffered another attack of colic. On August 10, 2002, the horse was rushed to the equine hospital at Tufts University near Boston, Massachusetts where he underwent emergency surgery. Following his surgery, Left Bank was sent to recover at Ashford Stud in Versailles, Kentucky but had to undergo further operations from which he was unable to recover and died on October 7, 2002.

== Assessment ==
Left Bank posthumously earned the Eclipse Award when he was voted the 2002 American Champion Older Male Horse. It marked the first Eclipse Award for trainer, Todd Pletcher.

== Pedigree ==
Pedigree of Left Bank
Sire French Deputy	Deputy Minister	Vice Regent	Northern Dancer
Sire French Deputy	Deputy Minister	Vice Regent	Victoria Regina
Sire French Deputy	Deputy Minister	Mint Copy	Bunty's Flight
Sire French Deputy	Deputy Minister	Mint Copy	Shakney
Sire French Deputy	Mitterand	Hold Your Peace	Speak John
Sire French Deputy	Mitterand	Hold Your Peace	Blue Moon
Sire French Deputy	Mitterand	Laredo Lass	Bold Ruler
Sire French Deputy	Mitterand	Laredo Lass	Fortunate Isle
Dam Marshesseaux	Dr. Blum	Dr. Fager	Rough'n Tumble
Dam Marshesseaux	Dr. Blum	Dr. Fager	Aspidistra
Dam Marshesseaux	Dr. Blum	Due Dilly	Sir Gaylord
Dam Marshesseaux	Dr. Blum	Due Dilly	Lord Matron
Dam Marshesseaux	Loboette	Good Counsel	Hail To Reason
Dam Marshesseaux	Loboette	Good Counsel	Polylady
Dam Marshesseaux	Loboette	Chanderelle	Graustark
Dam Marshesseaux	Loboette	Chanderelle	Chandalle
