= Frank Y. Whiteley Jr. =

Frank Whiteley Jr.
Personal information
- Born: January 31, 1915 Centreville, Maryland, USA
- Died: May 2, 2008 (age 93)
- Occupation: Trainer

Horse racing career
- Sport: Horse racing
- Career wins: 848

Major racing wins
- Cowdin Stakes (1963, 1964); Tremont Stakes (1963); Vagrancy Handicap (1963); American Derby (1965, 1967); Arlington Classic (1965); Aqueduct Handicap (1966, 1967, 1968); Dwyer Stakes (1967, 1972); Jockey Club Gold Cup (1967); Travers Stakes (1967); Wood Memorial Stakes (1967); Woodward Stakes (1967, 1976, 1977); Brooklyn Handicap (1968, 1976); Malibu Stakes (1968); Carter Handicap (1969, 1970); Long Island Handicap (1973); Astoria Stakes (1974); Fashion Stakes (1974); Spinaway Stakes (1974); Acorn Stakes (1975); Coaching Club American Oaks (1975); Comely Stakes (1975); Fall Highweight Handicap (1975); Mother Goose Stakes (1975); Marlboro Cup Invitational Handicap (1976); Metropolitan Handicap (1976, 1977); U.S. Triple Crown series: Preakness Stakes (1965, 1967); Belmont Stakes (1967)

Honours
- United States' Racing Hall of Fame (1978); South Carolina Athletic Hall of Fame (1998); Order of the Palmetto (2003); Frank Whiteley Day, Camden, South Carolina (2003)

Significant horses
- Tom Rolfe, Chieftain, Damascus, Forego, Northernette, Ruffian
- Updated on May 25, 2007

Frank Yewell Whiteley Jr. (January 31, 1915 – May 2, 2008) was a Hall of Fame Thoroughbred racehorse trainer.

Born and raised on a farm in Centreville, Maryland, Whiteley grew up around horses and from a very early age was intent on racing them. Developing his skills, by age twenty-one he had embarked on a professional training career in his home state. He retired forty-nine years later having trained some of the most famous American racehorses of the second half of the 20th century.

== U. S. Triple Crown series ==
Whiteley's first Champion was Tom Rolfe, who gave him his first win in the U.S. Triple Crown series in 1965 when Ron Turcotte rode him to victory in the Preakness Stakes. In 1967, Whitelely had his second Champion in Damascus, who won two more of the Classics and was voted the 1967 American Horse of the Year. Long reticent about talking to the media, leading up to the 1967 Kentucky Derby, Whiteley finally gave in as a result of all the hoopla surrounding Damascus. According to a New York Post newspaper article, "The first question was 'How did Damascus sleep last night?' To which Whiteley replied, 'How the hell would I know? I didn’t sleep with him.' Then he turned and walked back into the barn."

== Ruffian ==
For the 1974 racing season, Whiteley conditioned the horse with which he was most famously associated. Ruffian is considered by many as not only one of the greatest American fillies of all time but one of the greatest American Thoroughbreds of either sex. Undefeated as a two-year-old, she was voted the Eclipse Award as the 1974 U.S. Champion Filly and earned another Eclipse Award in 1975 when she captured the U.S. Triple Tiara. The filly set or equaled a race record in her ten consecutive wins. In her eleventh and final race, a match race at Belmont Park on July 6, 1975, she went up against that year's Kentucky Derby winner, Foolish Pleasure. With a crowd of more than fifty thousand watching from the grandstand and millions watching on national television, Ruffian had a half-length lead on the colt when both sesamoid bones in her right foreleg snapped. Despite surgery, she had to be euthanized.

Actor Sam Shepard played the role of Whiteley in the made-for-television movie Ruffian which aired June 9, 2007, on the ABC television network.

== Forego ==
In 1976, Whiteley took over the training of six-year-old champion Forego and guided the gelding to his third straight Eclipse Award for Horse of the Year and Outstanding Older Male Horse title. In 1977, he conditioned Forego for another successful season that saw him earn his fourth consecutive Eclipse Award for Outstanding Older Male Horse.

Whiteley was inducted in the National Museum of Racing and Hall of Fame in 1978 and in 1998 to the South Carolina Athletic Hall of Fame. Beginning in 1965, he wintered his horses at Marion duPont Scott's training Center in Camden, South Carolina, which set a trend with other horsemen that continues to this day. In recognition of his contribution to the Thoroughbred racing industry and the economy of the city of Camden, in 2003 the city council honored him with "Frank Whiteley Day" and awarded him a key to the city. In addition, that same year the Governor of South Carolina awarded him the Order of the Palmetto, South Carolina's highest civilian honor. The "Frank Whiteley Room" at the Camden Archive houses a permanent collection founded in his honor.

Whiteley's son, David, followed in his footsteps as a successful trainer of a number of graded stakes race winners. Whiteley died in Camden, South Carolina, on May 2, 2008.
