= H. Allen Jerkens =

American horse trainer (1929–2015)

Personal information
- Born: April 21, 1929 Islip, New York
- Died: March 18, 2015 (aged 85) Aventura, Florida
- Occupation: Trainer

Horse racing career
- Sport: Horse racing
- Career wins: 3,859

Major racing wins
- Edgemere Handicap (1957); Toboggan Handicap (1957, 1963, 1969, 1970); Saratoga Handicap (1958); Brooklyn Handicap (1962, 1967, 1981, 1994); Man o' War Stakes (1962); Suburban Handicap (1962, 1993, 1994, 2007); Black Helen Handicap (1963, 1967, 1970, 1975); Royal Palm Handicap (1965); Beldame Stakes (1967); Vagrancy Handicap (1968, 1969, 1989, 1994, 1995); Manhattan Handicap (1969); Spinster Stakes (1970); Delaware Handicap (1971, 1972); Metropolitan Handicap (1971); Vosburgh Stakes (1971); Cowdin Stakes (1972, 2003); Diana Handicap (1972, 1974); Carter Handicap (1973, 1994); Jockey Club Gold Cup (1973, 1975, 1998); Whitney Handicap (1973); Woodward Stakes (1973); Hempstead Handicap (1974, 1992, 1994); Derby Trial Stakes (1975); Comely Stakes (1976, 1994, 1997, 2004); Pennsylvania Governor's Cup Handicap (1979, 1983); Lexington Handicap (1980); Alcibiades Stakes (1985); Acorn Stakes (1988, 1993); Alabama Stakes (1992, 1993, 1994); Shuvee Handicap (1992, 1994, 2002, 2005, 2007); Test Stakes (1992, 2004, 2006); Wood Memorial Stakes (1992); Coaching Club American Oaks (1993); Mother Goose Stakes (1993); Pimlico Special (1993); Ruffian Handicap (1994); Tremont Stakes (1994, 1996); Ballerina Stakes (1995, 2001, 2002); Bold Ruler Handicap (1995, 1998, 1999); Gazelle Stakes (1997); Frank J. De Francis Memorial Dash Stakes (1998); Damon Runyon Stakes (2000); Frizette Stakes (2003)

Racing awards
- Eclipse Award for Outstanding Trainer (1973)

Honours
- National Museum of Racing and Hall of Fame (1975); Suffolk Sports Hall of Fame (1992); H. Allen Jerkens Stakes; H. Allen Jerkens Memorial Stakes

Significant horses
- Beau Purple, Devil His Due, Duck Dance; King's Bishop, Onion, Prove Out; Sensitive Prince, Sky Beauty

Harry Allen Jerkens (April 21, 1929 – March 18, 2015) was an American thoroughbred race horse Hall of Fame trainer.

Jerkens' father owned a riding academy on Long Island that led to his interest in horse racing, and in the spring of 1950 he obtained a trainer's license. Sometimes called the "Giant Killer", he is best known for his upsets. Jerkens saddled the 1973 Whitney Handicap winner Onion (defeating Secretariat), 1973 Woodward Stakes and Jockey Club Gold Cup winner Prove Out (defeating Secretariat and Riva Ridge, respectively), and Beau Purple, who defeated Kelso in three of their four meetings. His horses defeated other greats such as Buckpasser, Cougar II, and Forego.

In 1973, Jerkens was voted the Eclipse Award for Outstanding Trainer, and in 1975 he became the youngest trainer ever inducted into the National Museum of Racing and Hall of Fame at the age of 45.

Another of Jerkens' top horses was the filly Sky Beauty, who in 1993 swept the American Triple Tiara by winning the Acorn Stakes, the Mother Goose Stakes and the Coaching Club American Oaks. She won four Grade I races the following year en route to an Eclipse Award as outstanding older female.

In total, Jerkens won more than 200 stakes races.

Jerkens was inducted into the Suffolk Sports Hall of Fame on Long Island in the Horse Racing Category with the Class of 1992.

Jerkens was hospitalized in Florida on March 3, 2015, with an infection. He died on March 18, 2015, at the age of 85. Among his survivors are sons Jimmy and Steven, who are also thoroughbred trainers, son Allen and daughter Julie.

In 2017 the New York Racing Association renamed the King's Bishop Stakes for Jerkens, who himself trained King's Bishop to wins in the 1973 Carter Handicap and Fall Highweight Handicap for Allaire du Pont. Gulfstream Park runs another race, the H. Allen Jerkens Stakes, every December.
