= Onion (horse) =

American-bred Thoroughbred racehorse

- Sire: Third Martini
- Grandsire: Hasty Road
- Dam: With a Flair
- Damsire: Beau Gar
- Sex: Gelding
- Foaled: 1969
- Country: United States
- Colour: Chestnut
- Breeder: Hobeau Farm
- Owner: Hobeau Farm
- Trainer: H. Allen Jerkens
- Record: 54: 15-12-5
- Earnings: $243,547

Major wins
- Whitney Handicap (1973)
- Last updated on May 4, 2009

Onion (May 23, 1969 – October 24, 1995) was a U.S. thoroughbred whose victory over Secretariat in the 1973 Whitney Handicap is considered to be among the most dramatic upsets in the history of horse racing.

== Background ==
Onion was a chestnut gelding bred and owned by Hobeau Farm, based outside of Ocala, Florida, and was trained by Allen Jerkens. He was sired by Third Martini, who was trained by Jerkens to win several stakes races including the Knickerbocker Handicap in 1964.

== Racing career ==
Onion was initially not considered a top-tier horse and the early part of his career was focused on lower grade non-stakes races. On July 24, 1973, Onion achieved his first claim to notability by breaking the Saratoga Race Course track record for a six-furlong race.

Jerkens entered Onion in the Whitney Handicap, which was receiving added attention because of the presence of Secretariat, the winner of the Triple Crown, in his first race against older horses. Jerkens had noted that Secretariat's pre-race workout was flat and surmised the champion thoroughbred was not performing at his best. The Whitney was held on August 4, 1973, at Saratoga in front of a record crowd of 30,119. Secretariat was the 1:10 favorite, with Onion a 5:1 second choice among bettors. Three other horses participated in the race. When the race began, Jacinto Vásquez, Onion's jockey, took the early lead and never relinquished control. Secretariat raced in third before moving up on the inside rail to join Onion exiting the final turn. Onion however, held off the challenge of the younger horse and pulled ahead in the final strides to win by a length. After the race, Secretariat's jockey Ron Turcotte and trainer Lucien Laurin debated the unexpected upset, with Laurin publicly questioning Turcotte's handling of the race. Penny Tweedy, Secretariat's owner, later claimed the horse was running a low-grade fever on the racing day, but agreed to keep him in the race because she felt he could triumph over the field. Vasquez told an interviewer: "I probably caught him on a bad day. Onion wasn't the same caliber. It's just that he loved Saratoga and had a good day."

Onion and Secretariat met for a second and final time on September 15, 1973, for the inaugural running of the $250,000 Marlboro Cup Invitational Handicap at Belmont Park. Secretariat had returned to full health by this time and won the race while setting a new world record of 1:45 2/5 for 1 1/8 miles (1.8 km); Onion finished in fourth place.

== Later career and retirement ==
Onion never won another stakes race, and his post-Whitney career was undistinguished and troubled with injuries. Before his retirement in 1977, he was running in low-grade claiming races. Onion was retired to Hobeau Farms and died on October 24, 1995.
