= Whitney Stakes =

- Class: Grade I
- Location: Saratoga Race Course; Saratoga Springs, New York, United States
- Inaugurated: 1928
- Race type: Thoroughbred, Flat racing
- Website: Saratoga Race Course

Race information
- Distance: 1 1/8 miles (9 furlongs)
- Surface: Dirt
- Track: Left-handed
- Qualification: Four-year-olds and Up
- Weight: 124 lbs with allowances
- Purse: US$1,000,000

The Whitney Stakes (run as the Whitney Handicap through 2013 and still sometimes referred to as such) is an American Grade 1 stakes race for Thoroughbred racehorses four years of age and older run at a distance of 1 1/8 miles. The current purse is $1,000,000.

Held annually in late July/early August at the Saratoga Race Course in Saratoga Springs, New York, the race is named for the Whitney family, whose members were and remain prominent participants and supporters of the sport of Thoroughbred horse racing.

== History ==
The Whitney Stakes is administered by the New York Racing Association.

Named after the family that for generations has had so much to do with racing at Saratoga, the Whitney Handicap was first run in 1928. The Whitney family’s involvement with thoroughbreds began when William Collins Whitney, one of the founders of The Jockey Club, began campaigning racehorses in 1898, bearing the familiar Eton blue-and-brown silks. His legacy was carried on by his son, Harry Payne Whitney, and grandson, Cornelius Vanderbilt “Sonny” Whitney, who died in 1992, with other family members involved under various names including Greentree Stables. Whitney-owned horses have won every major race in the United States including multiple wins at the Kentucky Derby, the Preakness Stakes, and the Belmont Stakes.

The Whitney was raced at a distance of 1 1/4 miles from its inception in 1928 until 1955, when the distance was reduced to 1 1/8 miles. Until 1940 it was closed to geldings. The inaugural running was won by William R. Coe's two-time Champion Filly, Black Maria. During World War II, the race was run at Belmont Park from 1943 through 1945, and again once in 1961. Between 1957 and 1969 the race was restricted to horses four years and older. The race then was open to three-year-olds and older until 2019. In 2020 when Saratoga Race Course was closed to the public during the COVID-19 pandemic, the race was restricted again to four-year-olds and up; the age restriction has remained ever since.

Some of the greatest horses in American racing history have won the Whitney, including Easy Goer, Tom Fool, Dr. Fager, Stymie, Invasor, Slew o' Gold, Alydar, Ancient Title, Key to the Mint, Devil Diver, Eight Thirty, War Admiral, Discovery, Equipoise and Kelso, who won it for the third time in 1965 at the age of eight. The race also saw one of the most dramatic upsets in racing history when Secretariat finished second in the 1973 Whitney to Allen Jerkens's colt, Onion. Six fillies have won the race: Black Maria (1928), Bateau (1929), Esposa (1937), Gallorette (1948), Lady's Secret (1986), and Personal Ensign (1988).

In 2007, the Breeders' Cup Ltd. introduced the Breeders' Cup Challenge "Win and You're In" qualification format, under which the winner of the Whitney Stakes automatically qualifies for the fall running of the Breeders' Cup Classic.

In the 2015 listing of the International Federation of Horseracing Authorities (IFHA), the Whitney tied with the Kentucky Derby as the top Grade 1 race in the United States outside of the Breeders' Cup races.

== Records ==
Speed record:

- 1 1/8 miles – 1:46.64 – Lawyer Ron (2007)
- 1 1/4 miles – 2:02.00 – Devil Diver (1944) & Bolingbroke (1943)

Most wins:

- 3 – Kelso (1961, 1963, 1965)
- 3 – Discovery (1934, 1935, 1936)

Most wins by an owner:

- 6 – Greentree Stable (1931, 1942, 1944, 1951, 1953, 1958)

Most wins by a jockey:

- 5 – Pat Day (1986, 1987, 1989, 1995, 1998)
- 5 – Jerry Bailey (1992, 1997, 1999, 2001, 2003)

Most wins by a trainer:

- 5 – John M. Gaver Sr. (1942, 1944, 1951, 1953, 1958)

== Winners ==
Year	Winner	Age	Jockey	Trainer	Owner	Distance	Time
2026	Sovereignty	4	Junior Alvarado	William I. Mott	Godolphin Racing	1 1/8 miles	1:47.91
2025	Sierra Leone	4	Flavien Prat	Chad C. Brown	Peter M. Brant, Mrs. John Magnier, Michael Tabor, Derrick Smith, Westerberg & Brook T. Smith	1 1/8 miles	1:48.92
2024	Arthur's Ride	4	Junior Alvarado	William I. Mott	Glassman Racing	1 1/8 miles	1:48.54
2023	White Abarrio	4	Irad Ortiz Jr.	Richard E. Dutrow Jr.	C Two Racing Stable & Antonio Pagnano	1 1/8 miles	1:48.45
2022	Life Is Good	4	Irad Ortiz Jr.	Todd A. Pletcher	WinStar Farm & China Horse Club	1 1/8 miles	1:48.97
2021	Knicks Go	5	Joel Rosario	Brad H. Cox	KRA Stud Farm	1 1/8 miles	1:47.70
2020	Improbable	4	Irad Ortiz Jr.	Bob Baffert	WinStar Farm, China Horse Club & SF Racing LLC	1 1/8 miles	1:48.65
2019	McKinzie	4	Mike E. Smith	Bob Baffert	Karl Watson, Michael E. Pegram, Paul Weitman	1 1/8 miles	1:47.10
2018	Diversify	5	Irad Ortiz Jr.	Richard Violette Jr.	Lauren & Ralph Evans	1 1/8 miles	1:49.62
2017	Gun Runner	4	Florent Geroux	Steven M. Asmussen	Winchell Thoroughbreds & Three Chimneys Farm	1 1/8 miles	1:47.71
2016	Frosted	4	Joel Rosario	Kiaran McLaughlin	Godolphin Racing	1 1/8 miles	1:47.77
2015	Honor Code	4	Javier Castellano	Claude R. McGaughey III	Lane's End Farm	1 1/8 miles	1:47.82
2014	Moreno	4	Junior Alvarado	Eric Guillot	Southern Equine Stable	1 1/8 miles	1:48.05
2013	Cross Traffic	4	John R. Velazquez	Todd A. Pletcher	GoldMark Farm, LLC	1 1/8 miles	1:47.89
2012	Fort Larned	4	Brian Hernandez Jr.	Ian R. Wilkes	Janis R. Whitham	1 1/8 miles	1:47.76
2011	Tizway	6	Rajiv Maragh	H. James Bond	William L. Clifton Jr.	1 1/8 miles	1:52.43
2010	Blame	4	Garrett Gomez	Albert Stall Jr.	Adele B. Dilschneider	1 1/8 miles	1:48.88
2009	Bullsbay	5	Jeremy Rose	H. Graham Motion	Mitchell Ranch LLC	1 1/8 miles	1:48.12
2008	Commentator	7	John R. Velazquez	Nick Zito	Tracy Farmer	1 1/8 miles	1:50.23
2007	Lawyer Ron	4	John R. Velazquez	Todd A. Pletcher	Hines Racing LLC	1 1/8 miles	1:46.64
2006	Invasor	4	Fernando Jara	Kiaran McLaughlin	Shadwell Racing	1 1/8 miles	1:49.06
2005	Commentator	4	Gary Stevens	Nick Zito	Tracy Farmer	1 1/8 miles	1:48.33
2004	Roses in May	4	Edgar Prado	Dale L. Romans	Ken & Sarah Ramsey	1 1/8 miles	1:48.54
2003	Medaglia d'Oro	4	Jerry Bailey	Robert J. Frankel	Edmund A. Gann	1 1/8 miles	1:47.69
2002	Left Bank	5	John R. Velazquez	Todd A. Pletcher	Michael B. Tabor	1 1/8 miles	1:47:04
2001	Lido Palace	4	Jerry Bailey	Robert J. Frankel	John Amerman	1 1/8 miles	1:47.94
2000	Lemon Drop Kid	4	Edgar Prado	Scotty Schulhofer	Jeanne G. Vance	1 1/8 miles	1:48.30
1999	Victory Gallop	4	Jerry Bailey	Elliott Walden	Prestonwood Farm	1 1/8 miles	1:48.66
1998	Awesome Again	4	Pat Day	Patrick B. Byrne	Stronach Stables	1 1/8 miles	1:49.71
1997	Will's Way	4	Jerry Bailey	H. James Bond	Rudlein Stable	1 1/8 miles	1:48.37
1996	Mahogany Hall	5	José A. Santos	James Baker	Woodlyn Farm	1 1/8 miles	1:48.60
1995	Unaccounted For	4	Pat Day	Scotty Schulhofer	Morven Stud	1 1/8 miles	1:49.20
1994	Colonial Affair	4	José A. Santos	Scotty Schulhofer	Centennial Farms	1 1/8 miles	1:48.60
1993	Brunswick	4	Mike E. Smith	Anthony Margotta	Jerry Denker	1 1/8 miles	1:47.40
1992	Sultry Song	4	Jerry Bailey	Patrick Kelly	Live Oak Racing	1 1/8 miles	1:47.20
1991	In Excess	4	Gary Stevens	Bruce L. Jackson	Jack J. Munari	1 1/8 miles	1:48.00
1990	Criminal Type	5	Gary Stevens	D. Wayne Lukas	Calumet Farm	1 1/8 miles	1:48.60
1989	Easy Goer	3	Pat Day	Claude R. McGaughey III	Ogden Phipps	1 1/8 miles	1:47.40
1988	Personal Ensign	4	Randy Romero	Claude R. McGaughey III	Ogden Phipps	1 1/8 miles	1:47.80
1987	Java Gold	3	Pat Day	MacKenzie Miller	Rokeby Stable	1 1/8 miles	1:48.40
1986	Lady's Secret	4	Pat Day	D. Wayne Lukas	Eugene V. Klein	1 1/8 miles	1:49.80
1985	Track Barron	4	Ángel Cordero Jr.	LeRoy Jolley	Peter M. Brant	1 1/8 miles	1:47.60
1984	Slew o' Gold	4	Ángel Cordero Jr.	John O. Hertler	Equusequity Stable	1 1/8 miles	1:48.20
1983	Island Whirl	5	Ed Delahoussaye	Laz Barrera	Elcee-H Stable	1 1/8 miles	1:48.40
1982	Silver Buck	4	Don MacBeth	J. Elliott Burch	C. V. Whitney	1 1/8 miles	1:47.80
1981	Fio Rito	6	Leslie Hulet	Michael Ferraro	Raymond LeCesse	1 1/8 miles	1:48.00
1980	State Dinner	5	Ruben Hernandez	J. Elliott Burch	C. V. Whitney	1 1/8 miles	1:48.20
1979	Star de Naskra	4	Jeffrey Fell	Richard D. Ferris	Caryle J. Lancaster	1 1/8 miles	1:47.60
1978	Alydar	3	Jorge Velásquez	John M. Veitch	Calumet Farm	1 1/8 miles	1:47.40
1977	Nearly On Time	3	Steve Cauthen	LeRoy Jolley	Mrs. Moody Jolley	1 1/8 miles	1:49.40
1976	Dancing Gun	4	Roger Velez	Laz Barrera	Gedney Farms	1 1/8 miles	1:50.00
1975	Ancient Title	5	Sandy Hawley	Keith L. Stucki Sr.	Ethel Kirkland	1 1/8 miles	1:48.20
1974	Tri Jet	5	Laffit Pincay Jr.	Charles R. Parke	Fred W. Hooper	1 1/8 miles	1:47.00
1973	Onion	4	Jacinto Vásquez	H. Allen Jerkens	Hobeau Farm	1 1/8 miles	1:49.20
1972	Key To The Mint	3	Braulio Baeza	J. Elliott Burch	Rokeby Stable	1 1/8 miles	1:49.20
1971	Protanto	4	Jorge Velásquez	MacKenzie Miller	Cragwood Stables	1 1/8 miles	1:49.40
1970	Judgable	3	Robert Woodhouse	Herbert Nadler	Saul Nadler	1 1/8 miles	1:48.40
1969	Verbatim	4	Pete Anderson	James P. Conway	Elmendorf Farm	1 1/8 miles	1:50.00
1968	Dr. Fager	4	Braulio Baeza	John A. Nerud	Tartan Stable	1 1/8 miles	1:48.80
1967	Stupendous	4	Eddie Belmonte	Edward A. Neloy	Wheatley Stable	1 1/8 miles	1:48.20
1966	Staunchness	4	Ernest Cardone	Victor J. Nickerson	Red Oak Stable	1 1/8 miles	1:50.20
1965	Kelso	8	Ismael Valenzuela	Carl Hanford	Bohemia Stable	1 1/8 miles	1:49.80
1964	Gun Bow	4	Walter Blum	Edward A. Neloy	Gedney Farms	1 1/8 miles	1:49.20
1963	Kelso	6	Ismael Valenzuela	Carl Hanford	Bohemia Stable	1 1/8 miles	1:50.40
1962	Carry Back	4	Johnny Sellers	Jack A. Price	Katherine Price	1 1/8 miles	1:50.00
1961	Kelso	4	Eddie Arcaro	Carl Hanford	Bohemia Stable	1 1/8 miles	1:48.00
1960	Warhead	5	Mike Sorrentino	Kay Erik Jensen	Mabel C. Scholtz	1 1/8 miles	1:51.00
1959	Plion	4	Manuel Ycaza	Tom Jolley	Edward M. Potter	1 1/8 miles	1:53.00
1958	Cohoes	4	John Ruane	John M. Gaver Sr.	Greentree Stable	1 1/8 miles	1:51.60
1957	Kingmaker	4	Bobby Ussery	Frank I. Wright	Happy Hill Farm	1 1/8 miles	1:52.80
1956	Dedicate	4	William Boland	G. Carey Winfrey	Jan Burke	1 1/8 miles	1:49.80
1955	First Aid	5	Hedley Woodhouse	J. Elliott Burch	Brookmeade Stable	1 1/8 miles	1:51.60
1954	Social Outcast	4	Eric Guerin	William C. Winfrey	Alfred G. Vanderbilt II	1 1/4 miles	2:04.40
1953	Tom Fool	4	Ted Atkinson	John M. Gaver Sr.	Greentree Stable	1 1/4 miles	2:05.40
1952	Counterpoint	4	Dave Gorman	Sylvester Veitch	Cornelius V. Whitney	1 1/4 miles	2:05.60
1951	One Hitter	5	Ted Atkinson	John M. Gaver Sr.	Greentree Stable	1 1/4 miles	2:05.00
1950	Piet	5	Nick Combest	R. Emmett Potts	BoMar Stable	1 1/4 miles	2:06.60
1949	Round View	6	Sebastian Perez	Hollie Hughes	Sanford Stud Farms	1 1/4 miles	2:06.60
1948	Gallorette	6	Arnold Kirkland	Edward A. Christmas	William L. Brann	1 1/4 miles	2:05.20
1947	Rico Monte	5	Ruperto Donoso	Horatio Luro	W. Arnold Hanger	1 1/4 miles	2:02.60
1946	Stymie	5	Basil James	Hirsch Jacobs	Ethel D. Jacobs	1 1/4 miles	2:07.40
1945	Trymenow	3	Herb Lindberg	Oscar White	Walter M. Jeffords Sr.	1 1/4 miles	2:02.20
1944	Devil Diver	5	Eddie Arcaro	John M. Gaver Sr.	Greentree Stable	1 1/4 miles	2:02.00
1943	Bolingbroke	6	Herb Lindberg	Walter Burrows	Townsend B. Martin	1 1/4 miles	2:02.00
1942	Swing and Sway	4	Don Meade	John M. Gaver Sr.	Greentree Stable	1 1/4 miles	2:05.40
1941	Fenelon	4	James Stout	James Fitzsimmons	Belair Stud	1 1/4 miles	2:06.40
1940	Challedon	4	George Woolf	Louis Schaefer	William L. Brann	1 1/4 miles	2:03.20
1939	Eight Thirty	3	Harry Richards	Bert Mulholland	George D. Widener Jr.	1 1/4 miles	2:06.20
1938	War Admiral	4	Wayne D. Wright	George Conway	Glen Riddle Farm	1 1/4 miles	2:03.80
1937	Esposa	5	Nick Wall	Matthew P. Brady	William Ziegler Jr.	1 1/4 miles	2:05.20
1936	Discovery	5	John Bejshak	Bud Stotler	Alfred G. Vanderbilt II	1 1/4 miles	2:06.80
1935	Discovery	4	John Bejshak	Bud Stotler	Alfred G. Vanderbilt II	1 1/4 miles	2:04.80
1934	Discovery	3	Don Meade	Bud Stotler	Alfred G. Vanderbilt II	1 1/4 miles	2:07.80
1933	Caesar's Ghost	3	Dominick Bellizzi	Jack J. Connors	Brookmeade Stable	1 1/4 miles	2:10.80
1932	Equipoise	4	Raymond Workman	Thomas J. Healey	C. V. Whitney	1 1/4 miles	2:05.60
1931	St. Brideaux	3	Linus McAtee	James G. Rowe Jr.	Greentree Stable	1 1/4 miles	2:05.00
1930	Whichone	3	Raymond Workman	Thomas J. Healey	Harry Payne Whitney	1 1/4 miles	2:04.00
1929	Bateau	4	Eddie Ambrose	Scott P. Harlan	Walter M. Jeffords Sr.	1 1/4 miles	2:09.40
1928	Black Maria	5	Laverne Fator	William H. Karrick	William R. Coe	1 1/4 miles	2:06.00

* 1961 – Our Hope won the race but was disqualified from 1st to 2nd.
