= Prove Out =

American-bred Thoroughbred racehorse

- Sire: Graustark
- Grandsire: Ribot
- Dam: Equal Venture
- Damsire: Bold Venture
- Sex: Stallion
- Foaled: 1969
- Country: United States
- Colour: Chestnut
- Breeder: King Ranch
- Owner: 1) King Ranch; 2) Hobeau Farm
- Trainer: H. Allen Jerkens
- Record: 39: 9-6-4
- Earnings: US$270,426

Major wins
- Jockey Club Gold Cup (1973); Woodward Stakes (1973); Grey Lag Handicap (1974)

Prove Out (1969–1990) was an American thoroughbred racehorse best known for his wins over Secretariat in the 1973 Woodward Stakes, and Riva Ridge in the 1973 Jockey Club Gold Cup. Over a two-month period in 1973, he defeated four Hall of Fame horses (Secretariat, Riva Ridge, Forego, and Cougar II) in three different races at three different distances.

== Background ==
Prove Out was a chestnut horse bred by King Ranch. During his racing career he was trained by H. Allen Jerkens. Prove Out's dam Equal Venture, was a sister of the Triple Crown winner Assault and the granddam of the Eclipse Stakes winner Solford.

== Racing career ==
In the 1973 Woodward, Prove Out, at odds of 16:1, upset odds-on favorite Triple Crown champion Secretariat by 4 1/2 lengths, while conceding 7 pounds to the eventual 1973 Horse of the Year. Prove Out also defeated Secretariat's stablemate, the 1972 Kentucky Derby winner and 1973 U.S. Champion Older Horse Riva Ridge, in the 1973 Jockey Club Gold Cup.

In addition to his two memorable victories in 1973, Prove Out also ran track record times at Saratoga for 7 furlongs (1:21), and at Belmont Park for 1 1/16 miles (1:40 2/5). His Woodward Stakes time of 2:25 4/5 for 1 1/2 miles on an off track is the second fastest performance ever recorded for that distance at Belmont Park, behind only Secretariat's 2:24 record Belmont Stakes win. Prove Out's winning performance in the 2 mile Jockey Club Gold Cup was timed in 3:20, bettered in American racing only by the great Kelso. In a span of two months Prove Out decisively defeated four Hall of Fame horses: Forego, Secretariat, Cougar II, and Riva Ridge.

Prove Out would go on to win one other stakes race, the 1974 Grey Lag Handicap.

== Stud record ==
Prove Out was the broodmare sire of the champion filly Miesque.
