= Lido Palace =

Chilean-bred Thoroughbred racehorse

- Sire: Rich Man's Gold
- Grandsire: Forty Niner
- Dam: Sonada
- Damsire: Quick Decision
- Sex: Stallion
- Foaled: September 27, 1997; Haras Figuron, Chile
- Died: July 16, 2020 (aged 22); Haras El Centauro, Peru
- Country: Chile; United States
- Colour: Chestnut
- Breeder: Haras Figurón
- Owner: John W. Amerman/Amerman Racing
- Trainer: Robert J. Frankel
- Record: 23: 11-7-2
- Earnings: US$2,705,865

Major wins
- Clásico St. Leger (2000); Dos Mil Guineas (2000); Tanteo de Potrillos (2000); Gran Criterium (2000); Woodward Stakes (2001, 2002); Clark Handicap (2002); Whitney Handicap (2002)

Awards
- Chilean Horse of the Year (2000)

Lido Palace (September 27, 1997 - July 16, 2020) was a Thoroughbred racehorse who competed successfully in Chile and the United States.

In 2000 he was elected as Horse of the Year in his native Chile, after becoming the first Chilean Triple Crown winner (Dirt). He continued his career in the United States, where he most notably won back-to-back runnings of the prestigious Grade I Woodward Stakes, defeating the 2000 Horse of the Year and two-time Breeders Cup Classic winner Tiznow in the 2001 edition, as well as the Whitney Handicap, defeating the multiple graded stakes winner Albert the Great.

Lido Palace was named Horse of the Year in Chile.

Retired to stud duty, Lido Palace began his stallion career at Lambholm South near Ocala, Florida. Among his progeny is Vineyard Haven, winner of the Grade I Champagne and Hopeful Stakes in 2008. He was sold as a two-year-old in a private deal to Godolphin for a reported $12 million.

In 2009-2011, he served in Northview, Pennsylvania, and was subsequently sent to 2012 season at South America Haras el Centauro in Peru. Andrés Bezzola, owner of Haras el Centauro, noted that the presence of Lido Palace is a valuable contribution to Peruvian breeding.

On July 16, 2020, the death of Lido Palace was announced, the news was given by its owner Andrés Bezzola. He was 23 years old.

== Pedigree ==
Pedigree of Lido Palace (CHI), chestnut stallion, foaled September 24, 1997
Sire Rich Man's Gold (USA) 1992	Forty Niner (USA); 1985	Mr. Prospector (USA)	Raise a Native (USA)
Sire Rich Man's Gold (USA) 1992	Forty Niner (USA); 1985	Mr. Prospector (USA)	Gold Digger (USA)
Sire Rich Man's Gold (USA) 1992	Forty Niner (USA); 1985	File (USA)	Tom Rolfe (USA)
Sire Rich Man's Gold (USA) 1992	Forty Niner (USA); 1985	File (USA)	Continue (USA)
Sire Rich Man's Gold (USA) 1992	Honesty Joy (USA); 1979	Honest Pleasure (USA)	What a Pleasure (USA)
Sire Rich Man's Gold (USA) 1992	Honesty Joy (USA); 1979	Honest Pleasure (USA)	Tularia (GB)
Sire Rich Man's Gold (USA) 1992	Honesty Joy (USA); 1979	Dimashq (USA)	Damascus (USA)
Sire Rich Man's Gold (USA) 1992	Honesty Joy (USA); 1979	Dimashq (USA)	Romanita (USA)
Dam Sonada (CHI) 1984	Quick Decision (USA); 1972	Pronto (ARG)	Timor (FR)
Dam Sonada (CHI) 1984	Quick Decision (USA); 1972	Pronto (ARG)	Prosperina (ARG)
Dam Sonada (CHI) 1984	Quick Decision (USA); 1972	Moment of Truth (GB)	Matador (GB)
Dam Sonada (CHI) 1984	Quick Decision (USA); 1972	Moment of Truth (GB)	Kingsworthy (GB)
Dam Sonada (CHI) 1984	Siempre Arriba (CHI); 1976	Scelto (ARG)	Scratch (FR)
Dam Sonada (CHI) 1984	Siempre Arriba (CHI); 1976	Scelto (ARG)	Elite (ARG)
Dam Sonada (CHI) 1984	Siempre Arriba (CHI); 1976	Siempre Linda (CHI)	Sertorius (FR)
Dam Sonada (CHI) 1984	Siempre Arriba (CHI); 1976	Siempre Linda (CHI)	Moina (CHI)
