= Heliodoro Gustines =

Panamanian-American jockey and horse trainer

Personal information
- Born: 1940 (age 85–86) Panama City, Panama
- Occupation: Jockey

Horse racing career
- Sport: Horse racing
- Career wins: Not found

Major racing wins
- Queens County Handicap (1960, 1967); Lexington Handicap (1961); Long Island Handicap (1961, 1966); Man O' War Stakes (1961); New York Handicap (1961, 1970); Edgemere Handicap (1962); Coaching Club American Oaks (1963); United Nations Handicap (1964); Stuyvesant Handicap (1964, 1976); Woodbine Oaks Stakes (1965); Ladies Handicap (1967); Black Helen Handicap (1968); Comely Stakes (1968); Tremont Stakes (1968); Dwyer Stakes (1968, 1973); Saranac Handicap (1968, 1973); Woodward Stakes (1968, 1974, 1975); Fashion Stakes (1969); Prince of Wales Stakes (1969); Stymie Handicap (1969); Monmouth Handicap (1970); Morris Handicap (1971); Columbiana Handicap (1973); Cowdin Stakes (1973); Roamer Handicap (1973); Alabama Stakes (1974); E. P. Taylor Stakes (1974); Jockey Club Gold Cup (1974); Vosburgh Stakes (1974); Carter Handicap (1974, 1975); Brooklyn Handicap (1974, 1975, 1976); Widener Handicap (1974, 1975, 1976); Metropolitan Handicap (1976); Royal Palm Handicap (1976) American Classic Race wins: Belmont Stakes (1968)

Significant horses
- Chompion, Lamb Chop, Forego, Northern Queen, Stage Door Johnny, Stop The Music
- Updated on April 23, 2020

Heliodoro Gustines (born 1940 in Panama City, Panama) is a retired Panamanian-born jockey and horse trainer. In 1967, Time magazine called him "the best grass-course rider in the United States".

Gustines is best known as a jockey of U.S. Racing Hall of Fame inductee Forego whom he rode in 31 consecutive races, winning 21 of them. The most important win in his riding career came in an American Classic Triple Crown race on June 1, 1968, when he rode Stage Door Johnny to victory in 2:27 1/5 in the Belmont Stakes. The following year, aboard Sharp-Eyed Quillo, he won the second leg of the Canadian Triple Crown, the Prince of Wales Stakes.

After retiring as a jockey, Heliodoro Gustines took up training.
