= Woodward Stakes =

- Class: Grade II
- Location: Belmont Park; Elmont, New York, United States
- Inaugurated: 1954
- Race type: Thoroughbred – Flat racing

Race information
- Distance: 1 1/8 miles (9 furlongs)
- Surface: Dirt
- Track: left-handed
- Qualification: Three-year-olds and up
- Weight: Allowance
- Purse: $500,000 (2020)

The Woodward Stakes is an American Grade Il stakes race and is one of the premier races for older thoroughbred horses in the United States. It is named for prominent racehorse owner William Woodward.

The race was first run in 1954 at Aqueduct Racetrack and then at Belmont Park in late September. In 2006, the Woodward was moved to Saratoga Race Course where it was run on the final Saturday of the meet until 2020. The race was moved back to Belmont Park in 2021.

The Woodward was run as a handicap in 1954, 1955, and in 1976 and 1977. From 1957 through 1975 it was a weight-for-age event, and was run as an allowance stakes from 1977 through 1987. The race returned to being a handicap event in 1988, 1989, and 1990 then reverted to a weight-for-age race in 1991. In 2014, it was changed to allowance weights, meaning horses that do not meet certain conditions carry less weight. In 2020, it was returned to a handicap basis.

== History ==
This race is to honor the memory of Belair Stud's William Woodward Sr., a dedicated horseman, who was chairman of the Jockey Club from 1930 to 1950.

Since its inception, the Woodward Stakes has been run at a variety of distances:

- 1 mile – 1954
- 1 1/8 miles – 1955, 1976–1977, 1981–1987, 1990–2019, 2021-present
- 1 1/4 miles – 1956–1971, 1978–1980, 1988–1989, 2020
- 1 1/2 miles – 1972–1975

== Notable Moments ==
The Woodward has long been one of America's most prestigious stakes races on the East Coast, along with the Jockey Club Gold Cup. Both races currently serve as major preps for the Breeders' Cup Classic. The Woodward has been won by many horses who were subsequently named the American Horse of the Year and twenty winners of the race were eventually inducted into the Hall of Fame: Sword Dancer, Kelso, Gun Bow, Buckpasser, Damascus, Arts and Letters, Forego, Seattle Slew, Affirmed, Spectacular Bid, Slew o’ Gold, Precisionist, Alysheba, Easy Goer, Holy Bull, Cigar, Skip Away, Ghostzapper, Curlin and Rachel Alexandra.

Kelso, the only five-time Horse of the Year in American history, won three consecutive renewals of the race between 1961 and 1963. In the 1964 renewal, he faced the talented Gun Bow, who had already beaten Kelso once that year. The two battled the entire length of the stretch and were separated at the wire by less than an inch: Gun Bow won by the bob of his head.

In 1973, Secretariat lost the Woodward to Prove Out, who set a stakes record for the then-current distance of 1 1/2 miles. The next year, Forego began a four-year win streak. Triple Crown winners Seattle Slew and Affirmed also won the race during the 1970s.

In 2009 at age three, Rachel Alexandra became the first female to win the Woodward. It was also her first race against older males. Only one other 3-year-old filly had ever run in the Woodward: Summer Guest in 1972. She finished second to Key to the Mint before being disqualified and placed third. In 2011 Havre De Grace, a 4 year old filly, became the 2nd female to win the Woodward.

== Records ==
Speed record:

- 1:45.80 for 1 1/8 miles – Forego (1976) and Dispersal (1990)
- 1:59.40 for 1 1/4 miles – Alysheba (1988)
- 2:25.80 for 1 1/2 miles – Prove Out (1973)

Most wins:

- 4 – Forego (1974, 1975, 1976, 1977)

Most wins by an owner:

- 4 – Lazy F Ranch (1974, 1975, 1976, 1977)

Most wins by a jockey:

- 6 – Ángel Cordero Jr. (1978, 1981, 1982, 1983, 1984, 1985)
- 6 – Jerry D. Bailey (1992, 1995, 1996, 1998, 2001, 2005)

Most wins by a trainer:

- 6 – Todd A. Pletcher (2007, 2010, 2015, 2022, 2024, 2025)

Wins by a filly or mare:

- Rachel Alexandra (2009)
- Havre de Grace (2011)

== Winners of the Woodward Stakes ==
Year	Horse	Age	Jockey	Trainer	Owner	Time
2025	Locked	4	John R. Velazquez	Todd A. Pletcher	Eclipse Thoroughbred Partners & Walmac Farm	1:48.11
2024	Tapit Trice	4	Dylan Davis	Todd A. Pletcher	Whisper Hill Farm & Gainesway Stable	1:50.09
2023	Zandon	4	Flavien Prat	Chad C. Brown	Jeff Drown	1:48.48
2022	Life Is Good	4	Irad Ortiz Jr.	Todd A. Pletcher	WinStar Farm & China Horse Club Inc	1:49.57
2021	Art Collector	4	Luis Saez	William I. Mott	Bruce Lunsford	1:49.22
2020	Global Campaign	4	Luis Saez	Stanley M. Hough	Sagamore Farm LLC & WinStar Farm LLC	2:01.40
2019	Preservationist	6	Junior Alvarado	Jimmy Jerkens	Centennial Farms	1:48.11
2018	Yoshida	4	Joel Rosario	William I. Mott	WinStar Farm, China Horse Club Inc, SF Racing, Head of Plains Partners	1:48.94
2017	Gun Runner	4	Florent Geroux	Steve Asmussen	Three Chimneys Farm and Winchell Thoroughbreds	1:47.43
2016	Shaman Ghost	4	Javier Castellano	Jimmy Jerkens	Stronach Stables	1:48.92
2015	Liam's Map	4	Javier Castellano	Todd A. Pletcher	Teresa Viola Racing Stables	1:47.44
2014	Itsmyluckyday	4	Paco Lopez	Edward Plesa Jr.	Trilogy Stable& Laurie Plesa	1:48.84
2013	Alpha	4	John Velazquez	Kiaran McLaughlin	Godolphin Stables	1:49.28
2012	To Honor and Serve	4	John Velazquez	William I. Mott	Live Oak Plantation	1:48.56
2011	Havre de Grace ‡	4	Ramon A. Dominguez	J. Larry Jones	Rick Porter	1:49.18
2010	Quality Road	4	John Velazquez	Todd A. Pletcher	Edward P. Evans	1:50.00
2009	Rachel Alexandra ‡	3	Calvin Borel	Steve Asmussen	Stonestreet Stables	1:48.29
2008	Curlin	4	Robby Albarado	Steve Asmussen	Stonestreet Stables	1:49.34
2007	Lawyer Ron	4	John Velazquez	Todd A. Pletcher	Hines Racing LLC	1:48.60
2006	Premium Tap	4	Kent Desormeaux	John C. Kimmel	Kline, Alevizos, Whelihan	1:50.65
2005	Saint Liam	5	Jerry D. Bailey	Richard E. Dutrow Jr.	William K. Warren Jr.	1:49.07
2004	Ghostzapper	4	Javier Castellano	Robert J. Frankel	Stronach Stables	1:46.20
2003	Mineshaft	4	Robby Albarado	Neil J. Howard	Farish, Elkins, Webber	1:46.20
2002	Lido Palace	5	Jorge F. Chavez	Robert J. Frankel	Amerman Racing Stable	1:47.60
2001	Lido Palace	4	Jerry D. Bailey	Robert J. Frankel	John W. Amerman	1:47.40
2000	Lemon Drop Kid	4	Edgar Prado	Scotty Schulhofer	Jeanne G. Vance	1:50.40
1999	River Keen	7	Chris Antley	Bob Baffert	Hugo Reynolds	1:46.80
1998	Skip Away	5	Jerry D. Bailey	Sonny Hine	Carolyn H. Hine	1:47.80
1997	Formal Gold	4	Kent Desormeaux	William W. Perry	John D. Murphy	1:47.40
1996	Cigar	6	Jerry D. Bailey	William I. Mott	Allen E. Paulson	1:47.00
1995	Cigar	5	Jerry D. Bailey	William I. Mott	Allen E. Paulson	1:47.00
1994	Holy Bull	3	Mike E. Smith	Warren A. Croll Jr.	Warren A. Croll Jr.	1:46.80
1993	Bertrando	4	Gary Stevens	Robert J. Frankel	Edward Nahem & 505 Farms	1:47.00
1992	Sultry Song	4	Jerry D. Bailey	Patrick J. Kelly	Live Oak Plantation Racing	1:47.00
1991	In Excess	4	Gary Stevens	Bruce L. Jackson	Jack J. Munari	1:46.20
1990	Dispersal	4	Chris Antley	Grover G. Delp	Tom Meyerhoff	1:45.80
1989	Easy Goer	3	Pat Day	Shug McGaughey	Ogden Phipps	2:01.00
1988	Alysheba	4	Chris McCarron	Jack Van Berg	Dorothy Scharbauer	1:59.40
1987	Polish Navy	3	Randy Romero	Shug McGaughey	Ogden Phipps	1:47.00
1986	Precisionist	5	Chris McCarron	L. Ross Fenstermaker	Fred W. Hooper	1:46.00
1985	Track Barron	4	Ángel Cordero Jr.	LeRoy Jolley	Peter M. Brant	1:46.60
1984	Slew o' Gold	4	Ángel Cordero Jr.	John O. Hertler	Equusequity Stable	1:47.80
1983	Slew o' Gold	3	Ángel Cordero Jr.	Sidney Watters Jr.	Equusequity Stable	1:46.60
1982	Island Whirl	4	Ángel Cordero Jr.	D. Wayne Lukas	Elcee-H Stable	1:46.80
1981	Pleasant Colony	3	Ángel Cordero Jr.	John P. Campo	Buckland Farm	1:47.20
1980	Spectacular Bid	4	Bill Shoemaker	Grover G. Delp	Hawksworth Farm	2:02.40
1979	Affirmed	4	Laffit Pincay Jr.	Lazaro S. Barrera	Harbor View Farm	2:01.60
1978	Seattle Slew	4	Ángel Cordero Jr.	Douglas Peterson	Tayhill Stable	2:00.00
1977	Forego	7	Bill Shoemaker	Frank Y. Whiteley Jr.	Lazy F Ranch	1:48.00
1976	Forego	6	Bill Shoemaker	Frank Y. Whiteley Jr.	Lazy F Ranch	1:45.80
1975	Forego	5	Heliodoro Gustines	Sherrill W. Ward	Lazy F Ranch	2:27.20
1974	Forego	4	Heliodoro Gustines	Sherrill W. Ward	Lazy F Ranch	2:27.40
1973	Prove Out	4	Jorge Velásquez	H. Allen Jerkens	Hobeau Farm	2:25.80
1972	Key To The Mint	3	Braulio Baeza	J. Elliott Burch	Rokeby Stable	2:28.40
1971	West Coast Scout †	3	John L. Rotz	Mervin Marks	Oxford Stable	2:00.40
1970	Personality	3	Eddie Belmonte	John W. Jacobs	Ethel D. Jacobs	2:01.80
1969	Arts and Letters	3	Braulio Baeza	J. Elliott Burch	Rokeby Stable	2:01.00
1968	Mr. Right	5	Heliodoro Gustines	Evan S. Jackson	Cheray Duchin	2:03.00
1967	Damascus	3	Bill Shoemaker	Frank Y. Whiteley Jr.	Edith W. Bancroft	2:00.60
1966	Buckpasser	3	Braulio Baeza	Edward A. Neloy	Ogden Phipps	2:02.80
1965	Roman Brother	4	Braulio Baeza	Burley Parke	Harbor View Farm	2:01.80
1964	Gun Bow	4	Walter Blum	Edward A. Neloy	Gedney Farm	2:02.40
1963	Kelso	6	Ismael Valenzuela	Carl Hanford	Bohemia Stable	2:00.80
1962	Kelso	5	Ismael Valenzuela	Carl Hanford	Bohemia Stable	2:03.20
1961	Kelso	4	Eddie Arcaro	Carl Hanford	Bohemia Stable	2:00.00
1960	Sword Dancer	4	Eddie Arcaro	J. Elliott Burch	Brookmeade Stable	2:01.20
1959	Sword Dancer	3	Eddie Arcaro	J. Elliott Burch	Brookmeade Stable	2:04.40
1958	Clem	4	Bill Shoemaker	William W. Stephens	Adele L. Rand	2:01.00
1957	Dedicate	5	Bill Hartack	G. Carey Winfrey	Jan Burke	2:01.00
1956	Mister Gus	5	Ismael Valenzuela	Charlie Whittingham	Gustave Ring	2:03.00
1955	Traffic Judge	3	Eddie Arcaro	Woody Stephens	Clifford Mooers	1:48.20
1954	Pet Bully	6	Bill Hartack	Tommy Kelly	Ada L. Rice	1:35.60

- A ‡ designates that this is a filly or mare that won the race.
- † Cougar II finished first, but was disqualified and placed third.

== See also ==
- Woodward Stakes top three finishers and starters
