= Island Whirl =

American thoroughbred racehorse

- Sire: Pago Pago
- Grandsire: Matrice
- Dam: Alitwirl
- Damsire: Your Alibhai
- Sex: Stallion
- Foaled: March 17, 1978
- Country: USA
- Breeder: Elcee-H Stable & Breeding Farm, Inc. (William Harder)
- Owner: Elcee-H Stable
- Trainer: Lazaro S. Barrera, D. Wayne Lukas
- Record: 34:11-6-6
- Earnings: $1,144,010

Major wins
- El Cajon Stakes (1981); Malibu Stakes (1981); Super Derby (1981); Woodward Stakes (1982); Hollywood Gold Cup (1983); Whitney Handicap (1983)

Island Whirl (foaled March 17, 1978) is an American Thoroughbred racehorse and the winner of the 1983 Whitney Handicap.

== Career ==
Island Whirl's first race was on May 31, 1980, at Calder Racecourse, where he came in 8th. In his third start on October 29, 1980, again at Calder, he got his first win.

Island Whirl captured his first stakes race win on September 4, 1981, in the El Cajon Stakes. He then set a new Louisiana Downs track record for 1 1/4 miles in his second stakes race in the Super Derby.

Island Whirl won his first Graded stakes race win on January 3, 1982 in the Malibu Stakes. He competed in multiple other Graded stakes races throughout 1982, and won another in the Woodward Stakes on September 4 that year. His wins throughout 1982 helped him gain entry to the 1982 Jockey Club Gold Cup, where he placed 4th.

During the summer of 1983, Island Whirl picked up two major Graded Stakes wins in a row with victories in the prestigious Hollywood Gold Cup at Hollywood Park Racetrack and the 1983 Whitney Handicap, which turned out to be the last wins of his career.

Island Whirl's final races of his career came in the 1983 Monmouth Handicap in which he finished in second-place. That was followed by a fifth-place finish in the 1983 Woodward Stakes on September 3, 1983.

== Pedigree ==
Pedigree of Island whirl (USA), 1978
Sire Pago Pago (AUS) 1960	Matrice (AUS); 1951	Masthead	Blue Peter
Sire Pago Pago (AUS) 1960	Matrice (AUS); 1951	Masthead	Schiaparelli
Sire Pago Pago (AUS) 1960	Matrice (AUS); 1951	La Patrice	St. Magnus
Sire Pago Pago (AUS) 1960	Matrice (AUS); 1951	La Patrice	La Joconde
Sire Pago Pago (AUS) 1960	Pompilia (AUS); 1951	Abbots Fell	Felstead
Sire Pago Pago (AUS) 1960	Pompilia (AUS); 1951	Abbots Fell	Lady Abbess
Sire Pago Pago (AUS) 1960	Pompilia (AUS); 1951	Pagan Queen	Talking
Sire Pago Pago (AUS) 1960	Pompilia (AUS); 1951	Pagan Queen	Certes
Dam Alitwirl (USA) 1968	Your Alibhai (USA); 1958	Alibhai	Hyperion
Dam Alitwirl (USA) 1968	Your Alibhai (USA); 1958	Alibhai	Teresina
Dam Alitwirl (USA) 1968	Your Alibhai (USA); 1958	Your Game	Beau Pere
Dam Alitwirl (USA) 1968	Your Alibhai (USA); 1958	Your Game	Winkle
Dam Alitwirl (USA) 1968	Amber Dancer (USA); 1963	Native Dancer	Polynesian
Dam Alitwirl (USA) 1968	Amber Dancer (USA); 1963	Native Dancer	Geisha
Dam Alitwirl (USA) 1968	Amber Dancer (USA); 1963	Occasionally	Ambiorix
Dam Alitwirl (USA) 1968	Amber Dancer (USA); 1963	Occasionally	Seldom
