= Forego =

American-bred Thoroughbred racehorse

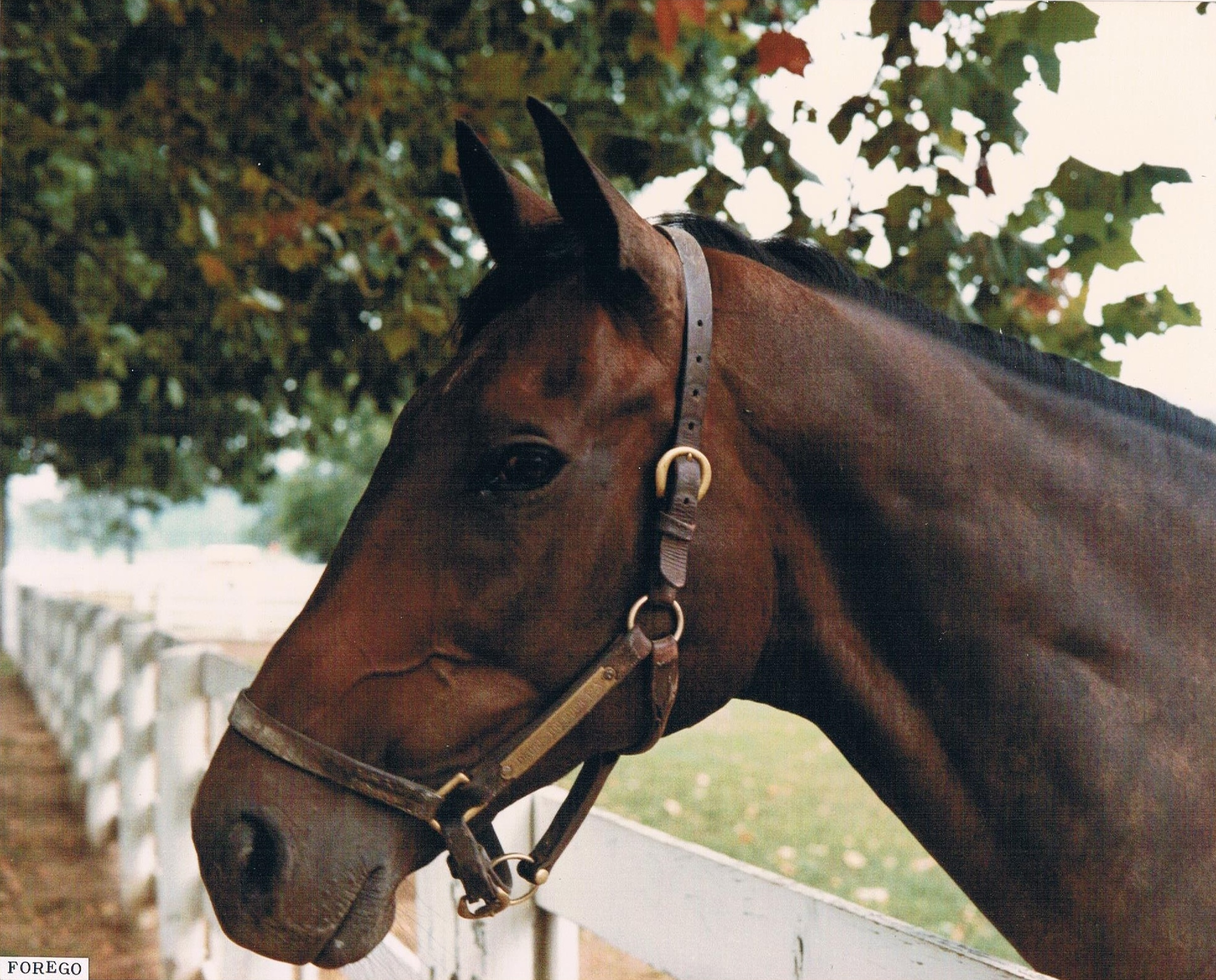
- Forego at the Kentucky Horse Park in 1981
- Sire: Forli
- Grandsire: Aristophanes
- Dam: Lady Golconda
- Damsire: Hasty Road
- Sex: Gelding
- Foaled: April 30, 1970; Paris, Kentucky, U.S.
- Died: August 27, 1997 (aged 27); Lexington, Kentucky, U.S.
- Country: United States
- Colour: Bay
- Breeder: Martha Farish Gerry
- Owner: Lazy F Ranch
- Trainer: Sherrill W. Ward; Eddie Hayward; Frank Y. Whiteley Jr. & David A. Whiteley
- Record: 57: 34-9-7
- Earnings: $1,938,957

Major wins
- Roamer Handicap (1973); Discovery Handicap (1973); Woodward Stakes (1974, 1975, 1976, 1977); Brooklyn Handicap (1974, 1975, 1976); Jockey Club Gold Cup (1974); Gulfstream Park Handicap (1974); Widener Handicap (1974, 1975); Carter Handicap (1974, 1975); Seminole Handicap (1975); Suburban Handicap (1975); Metropolitan Handicap (1976, 1977); Marlboro Cup (1976); Nassau County Handicap (1976, 1977)

Awards
- American Champion Sprint Horse (1974); American Champion Older Male Horse (1974, 1975, 1976, 1977); American Horse of the Year (1974, 1975, 1976)

Honours
- United States Racing Hall of Fame (1979) #8 - Top 100 U.S. Racehorses of the 20th Century; Forego Stakes at Turfway Park; Forego Handicap at Saratoga Race Course

Forego (April 30, 1970 – August 27, 1997) was an American Thoroughbred racehorse that won eight Eclipse Awards including Horse of the Year, Champion Handicap Horse and Champion Sprinter.

== Background ==
Foaled at Claiborne Farm in Paris, Kentucky, he was owned and bred by Mrs. Martha Farish Gerry's Lazy F Ranch. Over the years, Forego had four trainers; Sherrill W. Ward, Eddie Hayward, and eventually Frank Y. Whiteley Jr. and his son David A. Whiteley. He had two main jockeys: Hall of Fame rider Bill Shoemaker and Heliodoro Gustines.

== Racing career ==
In 1973, Forego was fourth behind Secretariat in a Kentucky Derby that was run in record time (1:59 2/5). Eddie Hayward, assistant trainer to Sherrill Ward, took over when Ward was ill and is officially listed as Forego's trainer in his wins in his final two races of 1973: the Roamer and Discovery Handicaps. During the 1973 season, Forego had 18 starts for 9 wins, 3 seconds and 3 thirds for $188,909 in earnings.

Forego started 1974 in Florida with wins in the Donn Handicap, Gulfstream Park Handicap and Widener Handicap. Moving back to his home base in New York, he next won the Carter Handicap and Brooklyn Handicap, while placing in the Metropolitan Handicap and Suburban Handicap. He started the fall campaign with a loss in the Marlboro Cup, then went on to win the Woodward Stakes, Vosburgh Handicap and Jockey Club Gold Cup. In the Vosburgh, he carried 131 pounds to victory, the first of 13 races in which he carried 130 pounds or more. He won three Eclipse Awards that year: Champion Sprinter, Champion Older Horse and 1974 Horse of the Year.

At the age of five years, he placed in all but one start. He won the Seminole and Widener Handicaps in Florida, took the Carter Handicap carrying 134 pounds (61 kg), set a track record with 132 pounds (60 kg) in the Brooklyn Handicap, and won the 1½ mile Suburban Handicap carrying 134 pounds (61 kg).

As a six-year-old, Forego won the 1976 Marlboro Cup (carrying 137 pounds) at Belmont Park. After contending for the lead, he faded to eighth of 11 horses on the backstretch, with Honest Pleasure holding the lead most of the way. Entering the stretch, Forego appeared to be too far behind, but he made up ground in the closing strides and just edged out Honest Pleasure. He also won the Brooklyn Handicap, Metropolitan Handicap and Woodward Stakes to become the leader in stakes earnings for a second time.

As a seven-year-old, Forego won the Metropolitan Handicap again and his fourth consecutive Woodward Stakes. He also was named Champion Handicapper for the fourth time.

He raced twice as an eight-year-old before chronic fetlock problems finished his racing career.

=== Summary ===
His versatility was clearly demonstrated with wins from 7 furlongs (1,400 meters) to the 2 mile (3,200 m.) Jockey Club Gold Cup. Owing to his wins, he was frequently handicapped to carry more than 130 pounds (59 kg), and even so often won. In 57 starts, Forego had 34 wins, 9 seconds and 7 thirds. He registered 24 stakes victories including 14 Grade 1 wins. His lifetime earnings amounted to $1,938,957.

== Honours ==
Forego won the Eclipse Award for Outstanding Sprint Horse in 1974, and Eclipse Award for Outstanding Older Male Horse for four years in a row: 1974, 1975, 1976, and 1977. He was voted the Eclipse Award for Horse of the Year for three years in a row: 1974, 1975 and 1976. He was inducted into the National Museum of Racing and Hall of Fame in Saratoga Springs, New York, in 1979. In the list of the Top 100 U.S. Thoroughbred champions of the 20th Century by Blood-Horse magazine, Forego ranks 8th.

== Retirement ==
Forego's grave at Kentucky Horse Park

Forego moved to the Kentucky Horse Park in 1979, the year after his last race. He lived there for the rest of his life until his death in 1997.

At 27 years of age, Forego broke his near (left) hind leg in a paddock accident and was euthanized.

== Pedigree ==
Pedigree of Forego (USA), bay gelding, 1970
Sire Forli (ARG) 1963	Aristophanes; 1948	Hyperion	Gainsborough
Sire Forli (ARG) 1963	Aristophanes; 1948	Hyperion	Selene
Sire Forli (ARG) 1963	Aristophanes; 1948	Commotion	Mieuxce
Sire Forli (ARG) 1963	Aristophanes; 1948	Commotion	Riot
Sire Forli (ARG) 1963	Trevisa; 1951	Advocate	Fair Trial
Sire Forli (ARG) 1963	Trevisa; 1951	Advocate	Guiding Star
Sire Forli (ARG) 1963	Trevisa; 1951	Veneta	Foxgrove
Sire Forli (ARG) 1963	Trevisa; 1951	Veneta	Dogaresa
Dam Lady Golconda 1958	Hasty Road; 1951	Roman	Sir Gallahad III
Dam Lady Golconda 1958	Hasty Road; 1951	Roman	Buckup
Dam Lady Golconda 1958	Hasty Road; 1951	Traffic Court	Discovery
Dam Lady Golconda 1958	Hasty Road; 1951	Traffic Court	Traffic
Dam Lady Golconda 1958	Girlea; 1951	Bull Lea	Bull Dog
Dam Lady Golconda 1958	Girlea; 1951	Bull Lea	Rose Leaves
Dam Lady Golconda 1958	Girlea; 1951	Whirling Girl	Whirlaway
Dam Lady Golconda 1958	Girlea; 1951	Whirling Girl	Nellie Flag (Family: 9-f)

== See also ==
- List of leading Thoroughbred racehorses
- Repeat winners of horse races
