= Jose A. Martin =

Jose Martin
Personal information
- Born: October 11, 1943 Havana, Cuba
- Died: November 22, 2006 (aged 63) Manhasset, New York, United States
- Occupation: Trainer

Horse racing career
- Sport: Horse racing
- Career wins: 1,139

Major racing wins
- New Orleans Handicap (1972); Tidal Handicap (1973); Frizette Stakes (1974, 1977, 1978); Bay Shore Stakes (1975); Gotham Stakes (1975); Astarita Stakes (1977); Bed O' Roses Breeders' Cup Handicap (1977); Matron Stakes (1977); Selima Stakes (1977); Top Flight Handicap (1977); Coaching Club American Oaks (1978, 1981); Great American Stakes (1978); Affectionately Handicap (1979); Count Fleet Stakes (1979); Busanda Stakes (1981); Dwyer Stakes (1981); Jerome Handicap (1981); Mother Goose Stakes (1981); Marlboro Cup Invitational Handicap (1981); Whirlaway Stakes (1981); Swaps Stakes (1981); Tremont Stakes (1981); Demoiselle Stakes (1984, 1985, 2002); Ancient Title Stakes (1986); Forego Handicap (1986, 1987); Tom Fool Handicap (1986, 1987); Roseben Handicap (1987); True North Handicap (1987); Vosburgh Stakes (1987); Young America Stakes(1987); Next Move Handicap (1990); Athenia Handicap (1990); Miss Grillo Stakes (1993); Suburban Handicap (1995); Demoiselle Stakes (2002)

Significant horses
- Groovy, Lakeville Miss, Noble Nashua, Wayward Lass

Jose A. Martin (1943 - November 22, 2006) was an American Thoroughbred horse racing trainer who trained three Champions as well as multiple Grade I winner, Noble Nashua.

Jose Martin was the son of U.S. Racing Hall of Fame trainer Frank "Pancho" Martin. He was also the father of trainer Carlos Martin.

A native of Havana, Cuba, Jose Martin came to the United States in 1960 where his father was training horses. During the years learning the business from his father, he was away for two years, serving with the 82nd Airborne Division of United States Army. After being discharged, in 1967 he went out on his own as a licensed Thoroughbred trainer.

In 1977, Jose Martin trained his first Eclipse Award winner when Lakeville Miss was voted American Champion Two-Year-Old Filly. He got his second with Wayward Lass in 1981 when she was American Champion Three-Year-Old Filly and his last with Groovy who, as at 2011, is the last horse to break the 130 Beyer Speed Figure having accomplished that milestone with 131 and 134 ratings in 1987 en route to be voted that year's American Champion Sprint Horse.

Diagnosed with lung cancer in 2002, on November 22, 2006, Jose Martin died at the North Shore University Hospital in Manhasset, New York.
