= Gotham Stakes =

American Thoroughbred horse race

- Class: Grade III
- Location: Aqueduct Racetrack; Queens, New York, United States
- Inaugurated: 1953
- Race type: Thoroughbred – Flat racing
- Website: www.nyra.com/index_aqueduct.html

Race information
- Distance: 1 mile (8 furlongs)
- Surface: Dirt
- Track: left-handed
- Qualification: Three-year-olds
- Weight: 123 lbs. with allowances
- Purse: $300,000 (since 2017)

The Gotham Stakes is an American Thoroughbred horse race for three-year-old horses run in early March at Aqueduct Racetrack in Queens, New York. A Grade III event with a current purse of US$300,000, it is set at a distance of 1 mile on the dirt. It is part of the Road to the Kentucky Derby.

== History ==
The race is named for New York City, which has been nicknamed Gotham since an 1807 article by Washington Irving. The event was inaugurated in 1953 at Jamaica Racetrack but following the facility's closure was moved to Aqueduct Racetrack for the 1960 season. In 1958, the race was restricted to horses four years of age and older.

The Gotham Stakes is the final local prep to the Wood Memorial Stakes and an official prep race for the Kentucky Derby. The only Derby winner who competed in the Gotham was American Triple Crown champion Secretariat, who tied the track record when winning the race in 1973. Easy Goer improved on this in 1989, setting a track record of 1:32.40 – one of the fastest times ever run in North America on the dirt.

Since its inception, the Gotham has been competed at various distances:

- 1 mile: 1960–1976, 1978, 1980–2002, 2004–2005, 2018–present
- 1 1/16 miles (8.5 furlongs): 1953–1959, 1977, 1979, 2006–2017
- 1 mile, 70 yards: 1984, 2003

The race was run in two divisions in 1953, 1974, 1975, and 1983.

== Records ==
Speed record:

- 1:32.40 – Easy Goer (1989) (Stakes and track record at 1 mile)
- 1:42.65 – I Want Revenge (2009) (at former distance of 1 1/16 miles)

Most wins by a jockey:

- 3 – Jorge Velásquez (1969, 1978, 1980)
- 3 – Ángel Cordero Jr. (1970, 1975, 1991)
- 3 – Jacinto Vásquez (1976, 1979, 1986)
- 3 – Richard Migliore (1985, 2003, 2005)
- 3 – Mike E. Smith (1990, 1992, 1995)
- 3 – Jose Lezcano (2008, 2022, 2023)

Most wins by a trainer:

- 3 – Claude R. McGaughey III (1989, 1992, 2005)
- 3 – Kiaran McLaughlin (2006, 2018, 2019)

Most wins by an owner:

- 2 – Cornelius Vanderbilt Whitney (1954, 1956)
- 2 – Claiborne Farm (1969, 1992)
- 2 – Locust Hill Farm (1983, 1988)
- 2 – Shadwell Stable (2016, 2019)
- 2 – St. Elias Stable (2024, 2026)

== Winners ==
Year	Winner	Jockey	Trainer	Owner	Time
2026	Iron Honor	Manuel Franco	Chad C. Brown	St. Elias Stable, William H. Lawrence & Glassman Racing	1:37.94
2025	Flood Zone	Reylu Gutierrez	Brad H. Cox	Wathnan Racing	1:39.62
2024	Deterministic	Joel Rosario	Christophe Clement	St. Elias Stable, Ken Langone, Steven C. Duncker & Vicarage Stable	1:36.37
2023	Raise Cain	Jose Lezcano	Ben Colebrook	Andrew Warren & Rania Warren	1:38.09
2022	Morello	Jose Lezcano	Steven M. Asmussen	Blue Lion Thoroughbreds	1:39.28
2021	Weyburn	Trevor McCarthy	Jimmy Jerkens	Chiefswood Stables Limited	1:38.70
2020	Mischevious Alex	Kendrick Carmouche	John Servis	Cash Is King LLC & LC Racing LLC	1:38.80
2019	Haikal	Rajiv Maragh	Kiaran McLaughlin	Shadwell Stable	1:35.63
2018	Enticed	Junior Alvarado	Kiaran McLaughlin	Godolphin Racing, LLC	1:38.24
2017	J Boys Echo	Robby Albarado	Dale L. Romans	Albaugh Family Stables LLC	1:46.34
2016	Shagaf	Irad Ortiz Jr.	Chad C. Brown	Shadwell Stable	1:45.90
2015	El Kabeir	Charles C. Lopez	John P. Terranova II	Zayat Stables	1:45.56
2014	Samraat	José Ortiz	Richard Violette Jr.	My Meadowview Farm	1:44.44
2013	Vyjack	Joel Rosario	Rudy R. Rodriguez	Pick Six Racing	1:44.09
2012	Hansen	Ramon Domínguez	Mike Maker	Dr. Kendall Hansen	1:43.84
2011	Stay Thirsty	Ramon Domínguez	Todd A. Pletcher	Repole Stable	1:44.78
2010	Awesome Act	Julien Leparoux	Jeremy Noseda	Susan Roy & Vinery Stables	1:43.85
2009	I Want Revenge	Joseph Talamo	Jeff Mullins	David J. Lanzman	1:42.65
2008	Visionaire	Jose Lezcano	Michael Matz	Team Valor International & Vision Racing	1:44.60
2007	Cowtown Cat	Ramon Domínguez	Todd A. Pletcher	Gulf Coast Farms & WinStar Farm	1:44.75
2006	Like Now	Fernando Jara	Kiaran McLaughlin	John J. Dillon	1:43.17
2005	Survivalist	Richard Migliore	Claude R. McGaughey III	Phipps Stable	1:35.61
2004	Saratoga County	Javier Castellano	George Weaver	Evelyn M. Pollard	1:35.53
2003	Alysweep	Richard Migliore	Patrick L. Reynolds	Michael Dubb & Mark Doneson	1:40.60
2002	Mayakovsky	Edgar Prado	Patrick Biancone	Michael Tabor	1:34.90
2001	Richly Blended	Rick Wilson	Ben Perkins Jr.	Raymond Dweck	1:35.14
2000	Red Bullet	Alex Solis	Joseph Orseno	Stronach Stables	1:34.27
1999	Badge	Shaun Bridgmohan	Joseph Aquillino	Southbelle Stable	1:34.72
1998	Wasatch	Jerry D. Bailey	Martin D. Wolfson	Frank Calabrese	1:36.56
1997	Smokin Mel	John Velazquez	John DeStefano Jr.	Sidney L. Port	1:34.38
1996	Romano Gucci	Julie Krone	Richard E. Dutrow	Herbert Kushner	1:34.40
1995	Talkin Man	Mike E. Smith	Roger Attfield	Helen G. Stollery & Kinghaven Farms	1:36.82
1994	Irgun	Jerry D. Bailey	Steven W. Young	Marianne Chase	1:36.27
1993	As Indicated	Caesar Bisono	Richard Schosberg	Heatherwood Farm	1:36.24
1992	Lure †	Mike E. Smith	Claude R. McGaughey III	Claiborne Farm	1:35.63
1992	Devil His Due †	Herb McCauley	H. Allen Jerkens	Lion Crest Stable	1:35.63
1991	Kyle's Our Man	Ángel Cordero Jr.	John M. Veitch	Darby Dan Farm	1:34.69
1990	Thirty Six Red	Mike E. Smith	Nick Zito	B. Giles Brophy	1:33.80
1989	Easy Goer	Pat Day	Claude R. McGaughey III	Ogden Phipps	1:32.40
1988	Private Terms	Chris Antley	Charles Hadry	Locust Hill Farm	1:34.80
1987	Gone West	Robbie Davis	Woody Stephens	Hickory Tree Stable	1:34.60
1986	Mogambo	Jacinto Vásquez	LeRoy Jolley	Peter M. Brant	1:34.60
1985	Eternal Prince	Richard Migliore	John J. Lenzini Jr.	Brian J. Hurst Jr.	1:35.80
1984	Bear Hunt	Don MacBeth	Roger Laurin	Taylor Purchase Farm	1:40.40
1983	Assault Landing	Vince Bracciale Jr.	Charles Hadry	Locust Hill Farm	1:35.80
1983	Chas Conerly	Jeffrey Fell	Mervin Marks	Daniel Lavezzo Jr.	1:36.60
1982	Air Forbes Won	Michael Venezia	Frank LaBoccetta	Edward Anchel	1:35.60
1981	Proud Appeal	Jeffrey Fell	Stanley M. Hough	Malcolm H. Winfield	1:33.60
1980	Colonel Moran	Jorge Velásquez	Thomas J. Kelly	Townsend B. Martin	1:37.00
1979	General Assembly	Jacinto Vásquez	LeRoy Jolley	Bertram R. Firestone	1:43.60
1978	Slap Jack	Jorge Velásquez	Lou M. Goldfine	Jerry Frankel	1:38.60
1977	Cormorant	Danny Wright	James P. Simpson	Charles Berry Jr.	1:43.60
1976	Zen	Jacinto Vásquez	David A. Whiteley	Pen-Y-Bryn Farm	1:35.60
1975	Laramie Trail	Mike Venezia	Jose A. Martin	Joseph M. Roebling	1:38.00
1975	Singh	Ángel Cordero Jr.	John W. Russell	Cynthia Phipps	1:37.00
1974	Stonewalk	Miguel A. Rivera	Daniel Lopez	Timberland Stable	1:36.00
1974	Rube The Great	Miguel A. Rivera	Frank Martin	Sigmund Sommer	1:35.20
1973	Secretariat	Ron Turcotte	Lucien Laurin	Meadow Stable	1:33.40
1972	Freetex	Chuck Baltazar	William T. Raymond	Middletown Stable	1:36.40
1971	Good Behaving	Ron Turcotte	John P. Campo	Neil Hellman	1:36.00
1970	Native Royalty	Ángel Cordero Jr.	John T. Davis	Happy Valley Farm	1:36.20
1969	Dike	Jorge Velásquez	Lucien Laurin	Claiborne Farm	1:34.80
1968	Verbatim	John L. Rotz	James P. Conway	Elmendorf Farm	1:34.00
1967	Dr. Fager	Manuel Ycaza	John A. Nerud	Tartan Stable	1:35.20
1966	Stupendous	Pete Anderson	Edward A. Neloy	Wheatley Stable	1:34.60
1965	Flag Raiser	Bobby Ussery	Hirsch Jacobs	Isidor Bieber	1:36.60
1964	Mr. Moonlight	Jimmy Combest	Nick Combest	Edith Baily Dent	1:37.20
1963	Debbysman	Larry Adams	Robert Dotter	Gustave Ring	1:34.60
1962	Jaipur	Bill Shoemaker	Bert Mulholland	George D. Widener Jr.	1:37.00
1961	Ambiopoise	Bobby Ussery	Thomas M. Waller	Robert Lehman	1:35.80
1960	John William	Sam Boulmetis	G. Auerbach	Merrick Stable	1:36.40
1959	Atoll	Eddie Arcaro	Ray Metcalf	Elkcam Stable	1:43.00
1958	Oh Johnny	William Boland	Norman R. McLeod	Mrs. Wallace Gilroy	1:43.60
1957	Mister Jive	Hedley Woodhouse	George M. Carter	J. L. Appelbaum	1:45.60
1956	Career Boy	Eric Guerin	Sylvester Veitch	Cornelius Vanderbilt Whitney	1:45.60
1955	Go Lightly	Joe Culmone	James McGee	Roslyn Farm	1:46.60
1954	Fisherman	Hedley Woodhouse	Sylvester Veitch	Cornelius Vanderbilt Whitney	1:46.20
1953 Div 2	Native Dancer	Eric Guerin	William C. Winfrey	Alfred G. Vanderbilt II	1:44.20
1953 Div 1	Laffango	Nick Shuk	Merritt A. Buxton	Trio Stable	1:44.00

† In 1992 there was a dead heat for first.
