= Ghostzapper =

American-bred Thoroughbred racehorse

- Sire: Awesome Again
- Grandsire: Deputy Minister
- Dam: Baby Zip
- Damsire: Relaunch
- Sex: Stallion
- Foaled: 2000
- Country: United States
- Colour: Bay
- Breeder: Adena Springs Farms
- Owner: Stronach Stables
- Trainer: Robert J. Frankel
- Jockey: Javier Castellano
- Record: 11:9-0-1
- Earnings: $3,446,120

Major wins
- Vosburgh Stakes (2003); Tom Fool Handicap (2004); Philip H. Iselin Breeders' Cup Handicap (2004); Woodward Stakes (2004); Metropolitan Handicap (2005) Breeders' Cup wins: Breeders' Cup Classic (2004)

Awards
- Champion Older Male (2004); United States Horse of the Year (2004); World's Top Ranked Horse (2004)

Honours
- National Museum of Racing and Hall of Fame (2012); Ghostzapper Stakes at Gulfstream Park (2021–)
- Last updated on 21 February 2022

Ghostzapper (foaled April 6, 2000) is a Thoroughbred racehorse who won the Breeders' Cup Classic in 2004, outdistancing Roses in May by three lengths in a track record time of 1:59.02. His gate-to-wire Classic victory completed a 4-for-4 season, which earned him the 2004 Eclipse Award for Horse of the Year. He was also ranked "World's Top Ranked Horse" for 2004 as compiled by the World Thoroughbred Racehorse Rankings.

Although he only raced eleven times in his career, his performances earned him the highest accolades from horse racing publications. Ghostzapper was inducted into the National Museum of Racing and Hall of Fame in 2012.

== Background ==
Ghostzapper was bred in Kentucky by Frank Stronach's Adena Springs Farms and raced as a homebred for Stronach Stables. Ghostzapper was sired by Awesome Again, who had won the 1998 Breeders' Cup Classic for Stronach. Awesome Again became a successful sire, with 61 stakes winners to his credit as of the end of 2015, including Game On Dude, Ginger Punch, Oxbow and Paynter. Ghostzapper's dam Baby Zip was a stakeswinner who had earlier produced City Zip, winner of the 2000 Hopeful Stakes.

Ghostzapper is a somewhat plain bay horse whose main distinguishing mark is a diamond shaped star on his forehead. Although a fierce competitor on the racetrack, he was quiet and well mannered at the stable and spent much of his spare time sleeping in his stall. He was trained by Hall of Fame inductee Bobby Frankel. He was widely considered to be one of the most brilliant horses of his era, but his career was plagued by ailments that restricted him to only eleven starts from age two to five.

== Racing career ==
Ghostzapper raced twice at age two, winning his debut at Hollywood Park on November 16, 2002, and then finishing fourth in an allowance race on December 26 at Santa Anita. He returned to the track on June 20, 2003, when he won an allowance race at Belmont Park. On July 26, he won an allowance race at Saratoga before facing stakes company for the first time in the King's Bishop Stakes on August 23. As was then his habit, he raced well behind the early pace before closing rapidly to finish third, a half-length behind the winner, Valid Video.

Ghostzapper made his next start in the Grade I Vosburgh Stakes on September 27. Despite having no stakes wins, he was the second choice in a field of older horses. After trailing the field early, he unleashed a "devastating" burst of speed and pulled away to win by 6 1/2 lengths. "I was really surprised how fast he caught these horses," said Frankel. "He was 12 (lengths) out of it, and the next thing you know, that's him on the outside. I said, `How did he get there so fast?'" His time for the 6 1/2 furlongs was 1:14 3/5, 1/5th of a second off the track record.

After Ghostzapper's victory in the 2003 Vosburgh, he took time off to recover from quarter cracks and a bruised hoof. His first 2004 start came on July 4 at Belmont Park in the Tom Fool Handicap. This time, he stayed close behind the early leaders and then moved to the lead on the far turn, drawing off to win by 4 1/4 lengths. He won the 7-furlong race in 1:20.42, 2/5ths of a second off the track record. "Bobby wanted to give him a rest and have him start fresh," said regular jockey Javier Castellano. "Bobby didn't want me to kill the horse after the layoff. I had to keep him with the pace, but not go too early and overuse him. He ran a big race today." Ghostzapper earned a Beyer Speed Figure of 120.

Although Ghostzapper was primarily thought of as a sprinter, Frankel believed the horse might be able to handle longer distances. "With the speed he showed, going long you might be able to sit there with him and turn him loose in the stretch,” he said. "Everybody wants to pigeonhole him as a sprinter; we don't know. He's an easy horse to rate."

To test Ghostzapper's stamina, Frankel entered him in the Philip H. Iselin Breeders' Cup Handicap at Monmouth Park Racetrack on August 21 over a distance of 1 1/8 miles. Over a muddy track, Ghostzapper won the race by 10 3/4 lengths in 1:47.66. He earned a 128 Beyer Speed rating, the highest ever assigned by the Daily Racing Form since they started publishing the numbers in 1992. The Form stated, "There can be no argument that Ghostzapper is the fastest horse in the country." (Before the numbers were published by the DRF, a few higher numbers were assigned by handicapper Andrew Beyer. Groovy, 1987 American Champion Sprint Horse, was the last horse to break the 130 Beyer Speed Figure, earning 133 and 132 in back-to-back 6-furlong races in 1987.)

Ghostzapper's next race was the Woodward Stakes at Belmont Park on September 11, again at a distance of 1 1/8 miles. Saint Liam, ridden by Edgar Prado, set the early pace, then dug in during the stretch as Ghostzapper tried to close ground. The two ran stride for stride as Saint Liam drifted away from the rail and bumped several times with Ghostzapper. Ghostzapper persisted and got his head in front in the final few strides. "I kept yelling, `Prado, keep your horse straight!' He bumped my horse a little bit, and my horse went on his wrong lead," said Castellano. "I love this horse. He's got a good, good heart. This is the first time he had to win like this (in a stretch battle) and he showed how good he really is."

His final race of 2004 was the Breeders' Cup Classic at Lone Star Park, run over a distance of 1 1/4 miles. The field included 2002 Horse of the Year Azeri, defending Breeders' Cup winner Pleasantly Perfect, American Classic winners Funny Cide and Birdstone, and multiple stakes winners Roses in May and Perfect Drift. Pleasantly Perfect went off at almost identical odds to Ghostzapper, with Ghostzapper a slight favorite. There were several factors of concern to the bettors, starting with the fact that Ghostzapper had never run at the distance. Another issue was trainer Bobby Frankel's poor record at the Breeders' Cup despite consistently training some of the best horses in the country. In addition, Ghostzapper drew post position one and risked getting trapped on the rail in heavy traffic. His exercise rider, Nuno Santos, was not concerned. "Drawing the rail doesn't matter, wire-to-wire," he said a few days before the race. "Believe me, no worries. This horse is unreal, a freak, and everyone is going to see it on Saturday. You're going to see a Secretariat type of race. I can feel him getting stronger every day, and I've never been as confident in a horse as I am with this guy, and that includes Azeri. It's another world. They're going to have to wait years and years to see another one like this." Frankel concurred. "If I don't screw him up and he goes into the Breeders' Cup as good as he is right now, he can't lose," he said. "It'll be no contest; that's all I'm telling you. That's how good this horse is."

However, Frankel was worried that Ghostzapper might get caught in an early speed duel with Roses in May. Ghostzapper would have to break fast to keep from getting trapped on the rail, and Roses in May was the only other horse in the race with the speed to challenge him early. If Roses in May pushed too hard, both horses might burn each other out and set up the race for a late closer. Accordingly, Frankel talked to the owner of Roses in May, Ken Ramsey, and said, "If we lay first and second and the jockeys keep them slow and don't kill each other trying for the lead, they'll finish one-two. You know what I'm saying? If they're not stupid and they stay cool, we'll be one-two." Ramsey agreed with the logic. "That's the best shot we got, and if I outrun you or you outrun me, we're still talking about $800,000 for second. That's nothing to sneeze at,” said Ramsey.

Ghostzapper justified the confidence of his connections and led the entire way, pulling away in the stretch to a three-length victory over Roses in May. The final time of 1:59.02 set a track record and an unofficial Breeders' Cup Classic record (because the race is run at different tracks, there is no official record).

Going into the 2004 Breeders' Cup, Frankel had a lifetime record of two wins in 57 Breeders’ Cup starts. He had never won the Classic, though he finished second with Bertrando in 1993 and with Medaglia d'Oro in 2002 and 2003. In the 2004 Breeders' Cup, Frankel finished out of the money with his first five starters. "The way this day had been going, I thought I was going to be in for a disaster," said Frankel. "This sure makes things better. This is as big a win as I've had in my career. In fact, it could be the biggest win I've had in my career. This is a good horse, a really good horse."

Despite winning only four races in 2004, Ghostzapper earned high praise from many handicapping experts. For example, Len Friedman of the Ragozin Sheets called him "the most consistently fast horse of all time." Jerry Brown from Thoro-Graph said, "To run as fast as he did in three consecutive races in essentially unheard of." Dick Jerardi wrote, "Ghostzapper is officially the fastest horse since Daily Racing Form began publishing Beyer Speed Figures in 1992."

"Few horses have devastated their opponents in so many ways, at so many distances, and in such fast times."—Steve Haskin

Ghostzapper won the 2004 American Horse of the Year title, beating Smarty Jones in votes 174–95. He was also voted the American Champion Older Male Horse. Ghostzapper was also named as the world's top ranked racehorse by the International Federation of Horseracing Authorities (IFHA) with a rating of 130.

Although Ghostzapper could easily earn millions of dollars a season as a stud, Stronach said he wanted to give something back to the game by returning him to competition in 2005. "I think he is a very exciting horse and I think I owe it to the racing public to run him next year," he said after the Breeders' Cup.

Ghostzapper was expected to start his 2005 campaign in the Oaklawn Handicap in April but had to be scratched. "The horse got sick last weekend, and has been running a temperature," said Frankel. "It's a sinus thing. He's already missed four days of training, and he'll miss a few more. Of course I'm disappointed we won't be coming, but we're not about to take any chances with this horse. We will take a step back, and wait for the Met Mile."

He made his 2005 debut on May 30 in the Metropolitan Handicap (more commonly known as the Met Mile) at Belmont Park. After settling into third place in the early running, he moved to the lead on the far turn and pulled away to win by 6 1/2 lengths. His time of 1:33.29 was two-fifths of a second off the stakes record. "I know you dream of winning the Kentucky Derby, but the best dream is to know you have the best horse," said Frankel. "I'm very emotional right now. He's a great horse, let's just put it that way. He's an amazing horse. He's probably the best sprinter in the country, and I think he can win going a mile and a half on the turf – I really do. (Castellano) never moved on him. He just took a hold of him in the stretch."

== Retirement and stud career ==
Ghostzapper was retired from racing on June 13, 2005, after the discovery of a hairline fracture of his left front sesamoid bone. Although he only had one win in 2005, his connections felt it helped solidify Ghostzapper's status as one of the all-time greats. "It was worth keeping him in training just for winning that one race", said Frankel. "He impressed people in the Met more than he did in the Breeders' Cup, and he ended his career in style." He retired with career earnings of $3,446,120.

Ghostzapper began his stud career at Stronach's Adena Springs Farm in Paris, Kentucky. His 2006 stud fee was set at $200,000, the highest ever fee for a first-year stallion at the time. After his first foal crop failed to impress, his stud fee started to decline, from $125,000 in 2009, to a low of $20,000 in 2012. In 2013 however, he was represented by sixteen stakes winners and interest in him reignited, and his stud fee rebounded to $60,000 for 2015, reaching $85,000 from 2018 to 2021.

Ghostzapper was relocated to Hill 'n' Dale Farms in Paris, Kentucky for the 2021 breeding season alongside fellow Adena Springs stallions Mucho Macho Man and Point of Entry. In October 2024, John G. Sikura, owner of Hill 'n' Dale, announced that Ghostzapper would relocate to Frank Stronach's Adena Springs North in Aurora, Ontario, where he would cover a limited number of mares in his final season breeding.

=== Notable stock ===
c = colt, f = filly, g = gelding

Foaled	Name	Sex	Major Wins
2007	Stately Victor	c	Blue Grass Stakes
2009	Contested	f	Acorn Stakes, Test Stakes
2009	Judy the Beauty	f	Breeders' Cup Filly & Mare Sprint, Madison Stakes
2009	Molly Morgan	f	La Troienne Stakes
2009	Starship Truffles	f	Princess Rooney Stakes
2010	Better Lucky	f	Matriarch Stakes, First Lady Stakes
2010	Moreno	g	Whitney Handicap
2012	Greenzapper	f	Grande Premio Roberto e Nelson Grimaldi Seabra
2012	Paulassilverlining	f	Humana Distaff Stakes
2012	Shaman Ghost	c	Queen's Plate, Santa Anita Handicap, Woodward Stakes
2015	Holy Helena	f	Queen's Plate
2016	Guarana	f	Acorn Stakes, Coaching Club American Oaks
2017	Nucky	c	Del Mar Futurity
2017	Mystic Guide	c	Dubai World Cup
2018	Goodnight Olive	f	Ballerina Stakes, Breeders' Cup Filly & Mare Sprint x 2, Madison Stakes
2019	Moira	f	Queen's Plate, Breeders' Cup Filly & Mare Turf
2021	Stronghold	c	Santa Anita Derby
2021	Segesta	f	Matriarch Stakes
2022	Ambaya	f	American Oaks

In recent years, Ghostzapper has also found success as a broodmare sire. His daughters have produced several graded stakes winners, including 2018 Triple Crown winner Justify, 2016 American Champion Sprint Horse Drefong and multiple stakes winner American Gal. Internationally, Ghostzapper's daughter Ghostly Darkness produced colt Levante Lion, winner of the Hakodate Nisai Stakes (JPN G3).

In 2012, Ghostzapper was inducted into the National Museum of Racing and Hall of Fame.

== Racing Record ==
Date	Track	Race	Distance	Finish	Margin	Time
11/16/2002	Hollywood Park	Maiden	6 1/2 Furlongs	1	9	1:15.57
12/26/2002	Santa Anita Park	Allowance	6 Furlongs	4	7 1/2	1:08.35
6/20/2003	Belmont Park	Allowance	6 Furlongs	1	3 1/4	1:09.39
7/26/2003	Saratoga Race Course	Allowance	7 Furlongs	1	1/2	1:21.74
8/23/2003	Saratoga Race Course	King's Bishop Stakes	7 Furlongs	3	1/2	1:22.14
9/27/2003	Belmont Park	Vosburgh Stakes	6 1/2 Furlongs	1	6 1/2	1:14.72
7/4/2004	Belmont Park	Tom Fool Handicap	7 Furlongs	1	4 1/4	1:20.42
8/21/2004	Monmouth Park	Philip H Iselin Breeders Cup Handicap	1 1/8 Miles	1	10 3/4	1:47.66
9/11/2004	Belmont Park	Woodward Stakes	1 1/8 Miles	1	neck	1:46.38
10/30/2004	Lone Star Park	Breeders' Cup Classic	1 1/4 Miles	1	3	1:59.02
5/30/2005	Belmont Park	Metropolitan Handicap	1 Mile	1	6 1/4	1:33.29

== Pedigree ==
Pedigree of Ghostzapper
Sire Awesome Again 1994	Deputy Minister; 1979	Vice Regent	Northern Dancer
Sire Awesome Again 1994	Deputy Minister; 1979	Vice Regent	Victoria Regina
Sire Awesome Again 1994	Deputy Minister; 1979	Mint Copy	Bunty's Flight
Sire Awesome Again 1994	Deputy Minister; 1979	Mint Copy	Shakney
Sire Awesome Again 1994	Primal Force; 1987	Blushing Groom	Red God
Sire Awesome Again 1994	Primal Force; 1987	Blushing Groom	Runaway Bride
Sire Awesome Again 1994	Primal Force; 1987	Prime Prospect	Mr. Prospector
Sire Awesome Again 1994	Primal Force; 1987	Prime Prospect	Square Generation
Dam Baby Zip 1991	Relaunch; 1976	In Reality	Intentionally
Dam Baby Zip 1991	Relaunch; 1976	In Reality	My Dear Girl
Dam Baby Zip 1991	Relaunch; 1976	Foggy Note	The Axe
Dam Baby Zip 1991	Relaunch; 1976	Foggy Note	Silver Song
Dam Baby Zip 1991	Thirty Zip; 1983	Tri Jet	Jester
Dam Baby Zip 1991	Thirty Zip; 1983	Tri Jet	Haze
Dam Baby Zip 1991	Thirty Zip; 1983	Saliaway	Hawaii
Dam Baby Zip 1991	Thirty Zip; 1983	Saliaway	Quick Wit (F-No.23-b)
