= Tom Fool Stakes =

- Class: Grade III
- Location: Aqueduct Racetrack; Ozone Park, New York, United States
- Inaugurated: 1975 (as Toom Fool Handicap)
- Race type: Thoroughbred – Flat racing
- Website: NYRA

Race information
- Distance: 6 furlongs
- Surface: Dirt
- Track: left-handed
- Qualification: Four-years-old and older
- Weight: 123 lbs. with allowances
- Purse: US$175,000 (since 2024)

The Tom Fool Stakes is a Grade III American Thoroughbred horse race for four-year-olds and older at a distance of six furlongs on the dirt run annually in early March at Aqueduct Racetrack in Ozone Park, Queens, New York. The event currently offers a purse of $175,000.

== History ==
The race is named for U.S. Racing Hall of Fame inductee Tom Fool who was champion two-year-old of 1951 and U.S. Horse of the Year in 1953. He is one of four horses to win the New York Handicap Triple which consists of the Metropolitan Handicap, the Suburban Handicap and the Brooklyn Handicap.

The inaugural running of event was on 17 December 1975 with conditions as a handicap for three-year-olds and older over a distance of seven furlongs and was won by Hobeau Farm's five-year-old Kinsman Hope who was trained by US Hall of Fame trainer H. Allen Jerkens and ridden by jockey John Ruane winning by a margin of one and one-half lengths in a time of 1:21 2/5.

The following year the event was moved and scheduled in the summer meet at Aqueduct and held in July and in 1977 the summer meeting returned to Belmont Park.

The winner of the 1978 running, J. O. Tobin as top weight carrying 129 lbs won easily by 6 1/2 lengths in a very fast time of 1:20 4/5. Although this would J. O. Tobin's last victory his six wins would be enough to capture US Champion Sprint Horse for 1978.

In although the event continued with handicap conditions in 1979 the event's name was modified to the Tom Fool Stakes and was used as such until 1995. In 1981 the American Graded Stakes Committee upgraded the classification of the event to Grade III and the following year to Grade II.

In 1987 Groovy won the event for the second time in easily by 6 1/2 lengths as the 3/5 odds-on favorite. Groovy's win was his fourth straight. He would win two more events before finishind 2nd in the Breeders' Cup Sprint. His efforts won him an Eclipse Award as US Champion Sprint Horse for 1987.

In 2002 the winner Left Bank started as the 8/5 favorite and set a new track record of 1:20.17 for the seven-furlong distance.

The 2004 running of the event only attracted four entrants. Stronach Stables' four-year-old Ghostzapper was returning after a lengthy nine-month layoff after his Grade I Vosburgh Stakes win and continued his winning streak comfortable winning the event in 1:20.42. Trainer Bobby Frankel however would pursue events that were a longer distance culminating with a victory in the Breeders' Cup Classic. Ghostzapper's outstanding season would earn him US Horse of the Year honors for 2004.

After not being held in 2010, the event was downgraded to Grade III and moved to Aqueduct in 2011 where it is held in March. From 2011 to 2017, the event was run on the inner track but is now run on the main track.

In 2015 the conditions of the event were modified not allow three-year-olds to enter.

== Records ==
Speed record:

- 6 furlongs: 1:08.77 – Do Share (2019)
- 7 furlongs: 1:20.17 – Left Bank (2002)

Margins:

- 6 3/4 lengths – Track Barron (1985)
- 6 1/2 lengths – J. O. Tobin (1978), Groovy (1987), Do Share (2019)

Most wins:

- 2 – Salutos Amigos (2015, 2016)
- 2 – Calibrachoa (2011, 2012)
- 2 – Rise Jim (1981, 1982)
- 2 – Groovy (1986, 1987)

Most wins by a jockey:

- 7 – Ángel Cordero Jr. (1976, 1981, 1982, 1985, 1987, 1988, 1991)

Most wins by a trainer:

- 5 – Todd A. Pletcher (2000, 2002, 2009, 2011, 2012)
- 5 – H. Allen Jerkens (1975, 1984, 1994, 1998, 2005)

Most wins by an owner:

- 2 – William H. Grinold (1981, 1982)
- 2 – Hobeau Farm (1975, 2005)
- 2 – Shadwell Racing (1996, 2008)
- 2 – Repole Stable (2011, 2012)
- 2 – David Jacobson (2015, 2016)
- 2 – Southern Equine Stable (2015, 2016)

== Winners ==
Year	Winner	Age	Jockey	Trainer	Owner	Distance	Time	Purse	Grade	Ref
At Aqueduct – Tom Fool Stakes
2026	Bold Journey	7	Eric Cancel	William I. Mott	Pantofel Stable, Wachtel Stable & Gary Barber	6 furlongs	1:10.70	$169,750	III	
2025	Full Moon Madness	5	Kendrick Carmouche	Michelle Nevin	Jay Em Ess Stable	6 furlongs	1:11:10	$175,000	III	
Tom Fool Handicap
2024	Super Chow	4	Madison Olver	Jorge Delgado	Lea Farms	6 furlongs	1:10.86	$175,000	III	
2023	Little Vic	4	Carlos Olivero	Juan Carlos Avila	Victoria's Ranch	6 furlongs	1:09.73	$150,000	III	
2022	Officiating	4	Manuel Franco	Saffie Joseph Jr.	Vegso Racing Stable	6 furlongs	1:12.22	$194,000	III	
2021	Chateau	6	Kendrick Carmouche	Rob Atras	Michael Dubb	6 furlongs	1:12.10	$200,000	III	
2020	Mind Control	4	Junior Alvarado	Gregory D. Sacco	Red Oak Stable & Madaket Stables	6 furlongs	1:10.88	$213,000	III	
2019	Do Share	6	Reylu Gutierrez	Michael J. Maker	Three Diamonds Farm	6 furlongs	1:08.77	$205,200	III	
2018	Skyler's Scramjet	4	Trevor McCarthy	Michelle Nevin	SJB Stable & Marcello Micozzi	6 furlongs	1:11.38	$200,000	III	
2017	Spartiatis	7	Rajiv Maragh	Leon J. Blusiewicz	Constantine Peter Beler	6 furlongs	1:11.23	$200,000	III	
2016	Salutos Amigos	6	Cornelio Velasquez	David Jacobson	David Jacobson & Southern Equine Stable	6 furlongs	1:10.17	$200,000	III	
2015	Salutos Amigos	5	Cornelio Velasquez	David Jacobson	David Jacobson & Southern Equine Stable	6 furlongs	1:09.61	$200,000	III	
2014	Strapping Groom	7	Irad Ortiz Jr.	David Jacobson	Drawing Away Stable & David Jacobson	6 furlongs	1:09.85	$200,000	III	
2013	Comma to the Top	5	Joel Rosario	Peter L. Miller	Gary Barber	6 furlongs	1:10.26	$200,000	III	
2012	Calibrachoa	5	Cornelio Velasquez	Todd A. Pletcher	Repole Stable	6 furlongs	1:09.07	$200,000	III	
2011	§ Calibrachoa	4	Ramon A. Dominguez	Todd A. Pletcher	Repole Stable	6 furlongs	1:09.67	$150,000	III	
2010	Race not held									
At Belmont Park
2009	Munnings	3	John R. Velazquez	Todd A. Pletcher	Derrick Smith, Mrs. John Magnier & Michael B. Tabor	7 furlongs	1:21.08	$185,000	II	
2008	Lucky Island (ARG)	4	Alan Garcia	Kiaran P. McLaughlin	Shadwell Racing	7 furlongs	1:22.73	$161,000	II	
2007	High Finance	4	John R. Velazquez	Richard A. Violette Jr.	West Point Stable	7 furlongs	1:21.81	$197,500	II	
2006	Silver Train	4	Edgar S. Prado	Richard E. Dutrow Jr.	Four Roses Thoroughbreds	7 furlongs	1:21.66	$150,000	II	
2005	Smokume	4	Chantal Sutherland	H. Allen Jerkens	Hobeau Farm	7 furlongs	1:21.92	$150,000	II	
2004	Ghostzapper	4	Javier Castellano	Robert J. Frankel	Stronach Stables	7 furlongs	1:20.42	$142,500	II	
2003	Aldebaran	5	Jerry D. Bailey	Robert J. Frankel	Flaxman Holdings	7 furlongs	1:22.54	$150,000	II	
2002	Left Bank	5	John R. Velazquez	Todd A. Pletcher	Michael B. Tabor	7 furlongs	1:20.17	$150,000	II	
2001	Exchange Rate	4	Jerry D. Bailey	D. Wayne Lukas	Padua Stables	7 furlongs	1:21.24	$150,000	II	
2000	Trippi	3	Jerry D. Bailey	Todd A. Pletcher	Dogwood Stable	7 furlongs	1:21.69	$150,000	II	
1999	Crafty Friend	6	Richard Migliore	John C. Kimmel	The Thoroughbred Corporation	7 furlongs	1:20.62	$150,000	II	
1998	Banker's Gold	4	Jorge F. Chavez	H. Allen Jerkens	Georgia E. Hofmann	7 furlongs	1:21.04	$150,000	II	
1997	Diligence	4	Jose A. Santos	Nicholas P. Zito	Kinsman Stable	7 furlongs	1:22.40	$150,000	II	
1996	Kayrawan	4	Richard Migliore	Kiaran P. McLaughlin	Shadwell Racing	7 furlongs	1:22.95	$108,100	II	
Tom Fool Stakes
1995	Lite the Fuse	4	Julie Krone	Richard E. Dutrow Sr.	Richard E. Dutrow Sr.	7 furlongs	1:21.72	$108,700	II	
1994	Virginia Rapids	4	Jean-Luc Samyn	H. Allen Jerkens	Middletown Stables	7 furlongs	1:22.27	$107,300	II	
1993	Birdonthewire	4	Craig Perret	Philip M. Serpe	Robert Kaufman	7 furlongs	1:20.93	$112,800	II	
1992	Rubiano	5	Julie Krone	Flint S. Schulhofer	Centennial Farms	7 furlongs	1:21.70	$118,200	II	
1991	Mr. Nasty	4	Angel Cordero Jr.	Guadalupe Preciado	Hidden Lane Farm	7 furlongs	1:21.60	$113,000	II	
1990	Quick Call	6	Jorge F. Chavez	Sidney J. Watters Jr.	Lynda B. Stokes	7 furlongs	1:21.57	$87,800	II	
1989	Sewickley	4	Randy Romero	Flint S. Schulhofer	Robert S. Evans	7 furlongs	1:24.00	$113,200	II	
1988	King's Swan	8	Angel Cordero Jr.	Richard E. Dutrow Sr.	Alvin Akman	7 furlongs	1:22.40	$168,300	II	
1987	Groovy	4	Angel Cordero Jr.	Jose A. Martin	Lone Star Stable	7 furlongs	1:22.40	$114,000	II	
1986	Groovy	3	Jose A. Santos	Jose A. Martin	John A. Ballis	7 furlongs	1:21.60	$111,600	II	
1985	Track Barron	4	Angel Cordero Jr.	LeRoy Jolley	Peter M. Brant	7 furlongs	1:22.00	$134,850	II	
1984	Believe The Queen	4	Jorge Velasquez	H. Allen Jerkens	Bohemia Stable	7 furlongs	1:22.40	$117,800	II	
1983	Deputy Minister (CAN)	4	Donald MacBeth	Reynaldo H. Nobles	Robert E. Brennan	7 furlongs	1:22.20	$86,700	II	
1982	Rise Jim	6	Angel Cordero Jr.	J. Joseph O'Shea	William H. Grinold	7 furlongs	1:23.80	$54,700	II	
1981	Rise Jim	5	Angel Cordero Jr.	J. Joseph O'Shea	William H. Grinold	7 furlongs	1:21.20	$54,700	III	
1980	Plugged Nickle	3	Jeffrey Fell	Thomas J. Kelly	John M. Schiff	7 furlongs	1:22.20	$55,100		
1979	Cox's Ridge	5	Eddie Maple	Joseph B. Cantey	Loblolly Stable	7 furlongs	1:22.20	$42,500		
Tom Fool Handicap
1978	J. O. Tobin	4	Jeffrey Fell	Laz Barrera	George A. Pope Jr.	7 furlongs	1:20.80	$43,250		
1977	Mexican General	4	Craig Perret	J. Bowes Bond	Mrs. Albert H. Lowenthal	7 furlongs	1:22.00	$37,675		
At Aqueduct
1976	El Pitirre	4	Angel Cordero Jr.	Laz Barrera	Enrique Ubarri	7 furlongs	1:24.40	$44,250		
1975	Kinsman Hope	5	John Ruane	H. Allen Jerkens	Hobeau Farm	7 furlongs	1:21.40	$44,875		

Notes:
§ Ran as an entry

== See also ==
- List of American and Canadian Graded races
