= Spectacular Bid Stakes =

- Class: Non-graded stakes
- Location: Gulfstream Park; Hallandale Beach, Florida, United States
- Race type: Thoroughbred - Flat racing
- Website: www.gulfstreampark.com

Race information
- Distance: 6 furlong sprint
- Surface: Dirt
- Track: left-handed
- Qualification: Three-year-olds
- Weight: Assigned
- Purse: $75,000

The Spectacular Bid Stakes is an American Thoroughbred horse race run annually at the beginning of January at Gulfstream Park race track in Hallandale Beach, Florida. An ungraded stakes race for three-year-old horses and once contested at a distance of six furlongs on dirt, as of 2016 it is now run at 6 1/2 furlongs and currently offers a purse of $75,000.

With the demise of Calder Race Course's Grade III Tropical Park Derby, the Spectacular Bid, named for the great Spectacular Bid, is the first stakes race of the three-year-old Florida campaign for many Kentucky Derby hopefuls, and was run on Gulfstream Park's winter season opening day. It has since been moved to March.

In 2011, Gulfstream's opening day was moved to early December creating two runnings of this race in one year, the first in January 2011 and the second in December 2011.

== Past winners ==
- 2016 - Morning Fire (1:17.16) (Daniel Centeno)
- 2015 - Barbados (1:09.40) (Luis Saez)
- 2014 - Just Call Me Kenny (1:10.58)
- 2013 - Merit Man (1:11:39) (Joel Rosario)
- 2012 - Ancient Rome (1:08.95) (Joe Rocco Jr.)
- 2011 - Determinato (1:11.13) (Eibar Coa)
- 2010 - A Little Warm (1:10.25) (Jeremy Rose)
- 2009 – Notonthesamepage (1:08.48) (Elvis Trujillo) (an 8 1/4 length win, missing the track record for six furlongs by .02 of a second.)
- 2008 - NOT RUN
- 2007 - Buffalo Man (1:09.60) (Eddie Castro)
- 2006 - Exclusive Quality (1:15.88) (Beat In Summation, twice winner of the El Conejo Stakes.)
- 2004 - Wynn Dot Comma (1:10.6) (Joe Bravo) (Saratoga County, a 2005 Eclipse Award finalist in sprint, placed.)
- 2003 - First Blush (1:10.97) (Jorge F. Chavez)
- 2002 - Maybry's Boy (1:12.19) (John Velazquez)
- 2001 - Icanseetherain (1:11.04) (José A. Santos)
- 2000 - B LS Appeal (1:10.68) (Mike E. Smith)
- 1999 - Texas Glitter (1:09.40) (wire to wire in the slop.)
- 1998 - Time Limit (1:10.56) (Jerry Bailey)
- 1997 - Confide (1:09.87)
- 1996 - Seacliff (1:11.92) (Gomtuu, 1995 Canadian Champion Two-Year-Old, came in third.)
- 1995 - Mr. Greeley (1:10.76) (2nd in Breeders' Cup Sprint)
- 1994 - Halo's Image (1:10.39)
- 1993 - Great Navigator (1:09.53)
- 1992 - Return To Quarters (1:10.10)
- 1991 - To Freedom (Angel Cordero Jr.) (Running undefeated.)
- 1990 - Housebuster (1:11 2/5) (Craig Perret) (1990, 1991 American Champion Sprint Horse.)
- 1989 - Halrose (1:12) (Douglas Valiente)
- 1988 - Cook's Brown Rice (1:11) (Alfredo Smith Jr.)
- 1987 - Spectacularphantom
- 1986 - Groovy (1:11.4) (Craig Perret) (American Champion Sprint Horse, 1987, last horse to break Beyer Speed Figure of 130, earning 133 & 132 in back-to-back 6-furlong races in 1987.)
