= True North Stakes =

American horse race

- Class: Grade III
- Location: Belmont Park; Elmont, New York, United States
- Inaugurated: 1979
- Race type: Thoroughbred – Flat racing
- Website: www.nyra.com

Race information
- Distance: 6 1/2 furlongs
- Surface: Dirt
- Track: left-handed
- Qualification: Four-years-old and older
- Weight: 124lbs with allowances
- Purse: US$400,000 (2025)

The True North Stakes is a Grade III American Thoroughbred horse race for horses aged four years old and older held over a distance of six and half furlongs on dirt scheduled annually in early June at Belmont Park in Elmont, New York. The event currently carries a purse of $400,000.

== History ==
The True North is named for the winner of the 1945 Fall Highweight Handicap, W. Deering Howe's, True North.

The event was inaugurated on 9 July 1979 as the True North Handicap and was won by the longshot Moleolus in a time of 1:10 4/5.

The event was classified as Grade III in 1982 and upgraded to Grade II in 1985. The only mare to win the event was Gold Beauty in 1993.

In winning the 1987 edition of the True North Handicap, Groovy earned a Beyer Speed Figure of 134.

In 2014 the conditions of the race changed to a stakes race. In 2017 the distance of the race was changed from 6 furlongs to 6 1/2 furlongs.

In 2024 the event was moved to Saratoga Racetrack due to infield tunnel and redevelopment work at Belmont Park.

In 2025 the event was downgraded by the Thoroughbred Owners and Breeders Association to Grade III status.

== Records ==
Speed record:

- 6 1/2 furlongs – 1:14.62 – Baby Yoda (2024)
- 6 furlongs – 1:07.80 – Groovy (1987)

Most wins:

- 2 - Firenze Fire (2020, 2021)
- 2 - Book'em Danno (2025, 2026)

Most wins by a trainer:

- 4 – William I. Mott (1991, 1993, 1998, 2023)

Margin:

- 8 1/2 lengths – Trappe Shot (2011)

Most wins by a jockey:

- 3 – Jean-Luc Samyn (1979, 1981, 1999)
- 3 – Ángel Cordero Jr. (1987, 1988, 1989)
- 3 – Robbie Davis (1996, 1997, 2000)
- 3 – Javier Castellano (2012, 2015, 2018)

Most wins by an owner:

- 2 – Seymour Cohn (1985, 1999)
- 2 – Mr. Amore Stables (2020, 2021)
- 2 - Atlantic Six Racing (2025, 2026)

== Winners ==
Year	Winner	Age	Jockey	Trainer	Owner	Distance	Time	Purse	Grade	Ref
At Saratoga – True North Stakes
2026	Book'em Danno	5	Paco Lopez	Derek S. Ryan	Atlantic Six Racing	6 1/2 furlongs	1:14.79	$400,000	III	
2025	Book’em Danno	4	Paco Lopez	Derek S. Ryan	Atlantic Six Racing	6 1/2 furlongs	1:14.64	$400,000	III	
2024	Baby Yoda	6	Eric Cancel	William I. Mott	Pantofel Stable, Wachtel Stable, Gary Barber & Jerold L. Zaro	6 1/2 furlongs	1:14.62	$350,000	II	
At Belmont Park
2023	Elite Power	5	Irad Ortiz Jr.	William I. Mott	Juddmonte	6 1/2 furlongs	1:15.65	$250,000	II	
2022	Jackie's Warrior	4	Joel Rosario	Steven M. Asmussen	Judy & J.Kirk Robison	6 1/2 furlongs	1:15.09	$300,000	II	
2021	Firenze Fire	6	Jose Ortiz	Kelly Breen	Mr Amore Stables	6 1/2 furlongs	1:15.52	$300,000	II	
2020	Firenze Fire	5	Irad Ortiz Jr.	Kelly Breen	Mr Amore Stables	6 1/2 furlongs	1:15.53	$150,000	II	
2019	Catalina Cruiser	5	Joel Rosario	John W. Sadler	Hronis Racing	6 1/2 furlongs	1:14.85	$250,000	II	
2018	Imperial Hint	5	Javier Castellano	Luis Carvajal Jr.	Raymond Mamone	6 1/2 furlongs	1:15.02	$240,000	II	
2017	Roy H	5	Paco Lopez	Peter L. Miller	Rockingham Ranch	6 furlongs	1:08.59	$250,000	II	
2016	Joking	7	Manuel Franco	Charlton Baker	Charlton Baker	6 furlongs	1:08.04	$240,000	II	
2015	Rock Fall	4	Javier Castellano	Todd A. Pletcher	Stonestreet Stables	6 furlongs	1:08.37	$250,000	II	
2014	Palace	5	José L. Ortiz	Linda L. Rice	Antonino Miuccio	6 furlongs	1:08.29	$250,000	II	
True North Handicap
2013	Fast Bullet	5	Joel Rosario	Bob Baffert	Zayat Stables	6 furlongs	1:08.27	$400,000	II	
2012	Caixa Eletronica	7	Javier Castellano	Todd A. Pletcher	Repole Stables	6 furlongs	1:09.52	$400,000	II	
2011	Trappe Shot	4	John R. Velazquez	Kiaran P. McLaughlin	Mill House	6 furlongs	1:08.86	$250,000	II	
2010	Bribon (FR)	7	Garrett K. Gomez	Todd A. Pletcher	Derrick Smith	6 furlongs	1:09.63	$250,000	II	
2009	Fabulous Strike	6	Ramon A. Dominguez	Todd M. Beattie	Walter Downey	6 furlongs	1:07.85	$250,000	II	
2008	Benny the Bull	5	Edgar S. Prado	Richard E. Dutrow Jr.	IEAH Stables, James Cohen, Pegasus Holdings Group & Sanford H. Robbins	6 furlongs	1:09.06	$250,000	II	
2007	Will He Shine	5	Edgar S. Prado	Dale L. Romans	Saviaro Pugliese & Marc Wexler	6 furlongs	1:08.70	$200,000	II	
2006	Anew	5	Alan Garcia	Steven M. Asmussen	Chrome Cowboy Racing & Raymond Vitolo	6 furlongs	1:08.10	$200,000	II	
2005	Woke Up Dreamin	5	Mike E. Smith	Bob Baffert	Michael E. Pegram	6 furlongs	1:08.38	$212,900	II	
2004	Speightstown	6	John R. Velazquez	Todd A. Pletcher	Eugene Melnyk	6 furlongs	1:08.04	$206,400	II	
2003	Shake You Down	5	Michael J. Luzzi	Scott A. Lake	Robert L. Cole Jr.	6 furlongs	1:09.40	$190,000	II	
2002	Explicit	5	Lonnie Meche	Ian P. D. Jory	Marvin Malmuth	6 furlongs	1:09.80	$250,000	II	
2001	Say Florida Sandy	7	Aaron Gryder	Juan Serey	John Rotella	6 furlongs	1:08.60	$150,000	II	
2000	Intidab	7	Robbie Davis	Kiaran P. McLaughlin	Shadwell Stable	6 furlongs	1:10.00	$150,000	II	
1999	Kashatreya	5	Jean-Luc Samyn	John O. Hertler	Seymour Cohn	6 furlongs	1:09.60	$150,000	II	
1998	Richter Scale	4	Jerry D. Bailey	William I. Mott	Nancy & Richard Kaster	6 furlongs	1:08.80	$138,600	II	
1997	Punch Line	7	Robbie Davis	William H. Turner Jr.	Althea Richards	6 furlongs	1:08.80	$110,300	II	
1996	Not Surprising	6	Robbie Davis	Judson Van Worp	Robert Van Worp	6 furlongs	1:09.00	$111,200	II	
1995	Waldoboro	4	Eddie Maple	Claude R. McGaughey III	Emory A. Hamilton	6 furlongs	1:09.60	$110,500	II	
1994	Friendly Lover	6	Rick Wilson	Joseph H. Pierce Jr.	Pastime Stable	6 furlongs	1:09.60	$112,300	II	
1993	Lion Cavern	4	Julie Krone	William I. Mott	Sheikh Mohammed	6 furlongs	1:10.20	$115,200	II	
1992	Shining Bid	4	Eddie Maple	Jack B. Morgan	Deborah A. Matz	6 furlongs	1:08.20	$119,800	II	
1991	Diablo	4	Julie Krone	William I. Mott	Bertram R. Firestone	6 furlongs	1:08.20	$116,200	II	
1990	Mr. Nickerson	4	Chris Antley	Mark J. Reid	Robert H. A. Nixon	6 furlongs	1:10.40	$85,600	II	
1989	Dancing Spree	4	Ángel Cordero Jr.	Claude R. McGaughey III	Ogden Phipps	6 furlongs	1:09.40	$113,600	II	
1988	§ High Brite	4	Ángel Cordero Jr.	D. Wayne Lukas	H. Joseph Allen	6 furlongs	1:10.00	$113,000	II	
1987	Groovy	4	Ángel Cordero Jr.	José Martín	Lone Star Stable	6 furlongs	1:07.80	$108,800	II	
1986	Phone Trick	4	Jorge Velásquez	Richard E. Mandella	Howell Wynne	6 furlongs	1:09.00	$110,800	II	
1985	Cannon Shell	6	D. J. Murphy	Chester Ross	Seymour Cohn	6 furlongs	1:10.80	$87,000	II	
1984	Believe The Queen	4	Jorge Velásquez	H. Allen Jerkens	Bohemia Stable	6 furlongs	1:09.80	$86,850	III	
1983	‡ Gold Beauty	4	Don Brumfield	William Curtis Jr.	Mrs. Philip Hofmann	6 furlongs	1:10.40	$84,600	III	
1982	Shimatoree	3	Mario G. Pinoclaud	Richard E. Dutrow Sr.	Rif'at Hussain	6 furlongs	1:08.60	$82,650		
1981	Joanie's Chief	4	Jean-Luc Samyn	Eugene Jacobs	Peter Barberino	6 furlongs	1:09.00	$58,800		
1980	Syncopate	5	Laffit Pincay Jr.	Ron McAnally	Elmendorf Farm	6 furlongs	1:09.20	$55,000		
1979	Moleolus	4	Jean-Luc Samyn	Patrick J. Kelly	Live Oak Plantation Racing	6 furlongs	1:10.40	$42,225		

Notes:
‡ Filly or Mare
§ Ran as part of an entry

== See also ==
- List of American and Canadian Graded races
