= Frizette Stakes =

The Frizette
- Class: Grade I
- Location: Belmont Park; Elmont, New York; United States
- Inaugurated: 1945
- Race type: Thoroughbred – Flat racing
- Website: www.nyra.com/index_belmont.html

Race information
- Distance: One Mile (8 furlongs)
- Surface: Dirt
- Qualification: Two-year-old fillies
- Weight: Weight-For-Age
- Purse: $400,000 (since 2015)

The Frizette Stakes is an American Thoroughbred horse race for two-year-old fillies raced annually at Belmont Park in October. It is currently a Grade I stakes race at a distance of one mile. The Frizette is the female counterpart of the Champagne Stakes.

The race is currently part of the Breeders' Cup Challenge series. The winner automatically qualifies for the Breeders' Cup Juvenile Fillies.

The Frizette was named for the James R. Keene owned and bred racing filly who won the Rosedale Stakes in 1907 and one of the most important foundation mares of the twentieth century. Sired by Hamburg, Frizette was the granddam of the Hall of Fame inductee, Myrtlewood.

Inaugurated in 1945, the Frizette was first run at the Jamaica Race Course, then ran at Aqueduct Racetrack in 1960, 1961, and from 1963 to 1967. There was no race run from 1949 through 1951.

Since inception, it has been run at various distances:

- 5 furlongs : 1948
- 6 furlongs: 1945–1947, 1952–1953
- 1 mile : 1960–1993, 2005 to present
- 1 1/16 miles : 1954–1958, 1994–2004
- 1 1/8 miles : 1985

== Records ==
Speed record: (at current distance of 1 mile)

- 1:34.57 – Jaywalk (2018)

Most wins by a jockey:

- 4 – Laffit Pincay Jr. (1974, 1980, 1985, 1988)
- 4 – Jerry D. Bailey (1992, 1997, 1998, 2000)
- 4 – John R. Velazquez (2002, 2005, 2009, 2012)

Most wins by an owner:

- 4 – Ogden Phipps (1967, 1971, 1986, 1993)

Most wins by a trainer:

- 7 – D. Wayne Lukas (1985, 1987, 1988, 1989, 1994, 1995, 1999)

== Winners of the Frizette Stakes ==
Year	Winner	Jockey	Trainer	Owner	Time
2026	Dotsy	Kendrick Carmouche	John A. Grabowski	TSP Enterprises	1:36.07
2025	Iron Orchard	Joel Rosario	Danny Gargan	CSLR Racing Partners & R. A. Hill Stable	1:37.97
2024	Scottish Lassie	Jose Lezcano	Jorge R. Abreu	Sportsmen Stable, Parkland Thoroughbreds Et Al	1:36.73
2023	Just F Y I	Junior Alvarado	William I. Mott	George Krikorian	1:37.59
2022	Chocolate Gelato	Irad Ortiz Jr.	Todd A. Pletcher	Repole Stable	1:38.57
2021	Echo Zulu	Ricardo Santana Jr.	Steven M. Asmussen	L and N Racing and Winchell Thoroughbreds	1:35.12
2020	Dayoutoftheoffice	Junior Alvarado	Timothy E. Hamm	Siena Farms LLC	1:35.82
2019	Wicked Whisper	Joel Rosario	Steven M. Asmussen	Siena Farms LLC	1:35.92
2018	Jaywalk	Joel Rosario	John Servis	Cash is King LLC, Leonard Green	1:34.57
2017	Separationofpowers	José Ortiz	Chad Brown	Klaravich Stables	1:38.66
2016	Yellow Agate	Manuel Franco	Christophe Clement	China Horse Club	1:35.82
2015	Nickname	Javier Castellano	Steven M. Asmussen	LNJ Foxwoods	1:37.76
2014	By the Moon	José Ortiz	Michelle Nevin	Jay Em Ess Stable	1:39.42
2013	Artemis Agrotera	Jose Lezcano	Michael E. Hushion	Chester Broman Sr. & Mary Broman	1:36.25
2012	Dreaming of Julia	John R. Velazquez	Todd A. Pletcher	Stonestreet Stables	1:37.10
2011	My Miss Aurelia	Corey Nakatani	Steven M. Asmussen	Stonestreet Stables/Bolton	1:35.22
2010	A Z Warrior	Alan Garcia	Bob Baffert	Zayat Stables	1:35.68
2009	Devil May Care	John R. Velazquez	Todd A. Pletcher	Glencrest Farm	1:35.07
2008	Sky Diva	Ramon Domínguez	Steve Klesaris	Jeffrey Puglisi	1:37.40
2007	Indian Blessing	Garrett Gomez	Bob Baffert	Patti & Hal J. Earnhardt III	1:37.64
2006	Sutra	Mike Luzzi	Michael Stidham	Oak Crest Farm, LLC	1:40.22
2005	Adieu	John R. Velazquez	Todd A. Pletcher	Michael Tabor	1:38.07
2004	Balletto	Corey Nakatani	Thomas Albertrani	Darley Stable	1:43.52
2003	Society Selection	Ray Ganpath	H. Allen Jerkens	Irving & Marjorie Cowan	1:43.95
2002	Storm Flag Flying	John R. Velazquez	C. R. McGaughey III	Ogden Mills Phipps	1:44.20
2001	You	Edgar Prado	Robert J. Frankel	Edmund A. Gann	1:43.94
2000	Raging Fever	Jerry D. Bailey	Mark Hennig	Edward P. Evans	1:43.57
1999	Surfside	Pat Day	D. Wayne Lukas	Overbrook Farm	1:43.18
1998	Confessional	Jerry D. Bailey	William I. Mott	Pin Oak Stable	1:42.88
1997	Silver Maiden	Jerry D. Bailey	Britt A. McGehee	Frank Calabrese	1:42.74
1996	Storm Song	Craig Perret	Nicholas Zito	Dogwood Stable	1:42.47
1995	Golden Attraction	Gary Stevens	D. Wayne Lukas	William T. Young	1:42.95
1994	Flanders	Pat Day	D. Wayne Lukas	William T. Young	1:43.94
1993	Heavenly Prize	Mike E. Smith	C. R. McGaughey III	Ogden Phipps	1:35.46
1992	Educated Risk	Jerry D. Bailey	C. R. McGaughey III	Ogden Mills Phipps	1:36.62
1991	Preach	Julie Krone	C. R. McGaughey III	Claiborne Farm	1:37.20
1990	Meadow Star	José A. Santos	LeRoy Jolley	Carl Icahn	1:35.40
1989	Stella Madrid	Ángel Cordero Jr.	D. Wayne Lukas	Peter M. Brant	1:38.80
1988	Some Romance	Laffit Pincay Jr.	D. Wayne Lukas	Eugene V. Klein	1:36.80
1987	Classic Crown	Ángel Cordero Jr.	D. Wayne Lukas	Star Crown Stable (Andrew Rosen)	1:37.20
1986	Personal Ensign	Randy Romero	C. R. McGaughey III	Ogden Phipps	1:36.40
1985	Family Style	Laffit Pincay Jr.	D. Wayne Lukas	Eugene V. Klein	1:37.20
1984	Charleston Rag	Don MacBeth	Del W. Carroll II	William S. Farish	1:39.00
1983	Miss Oceana	Eddie Maple	Woody Stephens	Newstead Farm	1:36.60
1982	Princess Rooney	Jeffrey Fell	Frank Gomez	Paula J. Tucker	1:39.00
1981	Proud Lou	Dan Beckon	James Hardy	William Graham	1:38.80
1980	Heavenly Cause	Laffit Pincay Jr.	Woody Stephens	Ryehill Farm	1:38.00
1979	Smart Angle	Sam Maple	Woody Stephens	Ryehill Farm	1:38.20
1978	Golferette	Jeffrey Fell	Jose A. Martin	Jose A. Martin	1:35.40
1977	Lakeville Miss	Ruben Hernandez	Jose A. Martin	Randolph Weinsier	1:36.20
1976	Sensational	Jorge Velásquez	Woody Stephens	Mill House	1:36.20
1975	Optimistic Gal	Braulio Baeza	LeRoy Jolley	Diana M. Firestone	1:36.80
1974	Molly Ballantine	Laffit Pincay Jr.	Jose A. Martin	Jerome Castle	1:36.80
1973	Bundler	Jacinto Vásquez	Anthony L. Basile	Bwamazon Farm	1:36.40
1972	La Prevoyante	John LeBlanc	Yonnie Starr	Jean-Louis Levesque	1:37.40
1971	Numbered Account	Braulio Baeza	Roger Laurin	Ogden Phipps	1:35.60
1970	Forward Gal	Jorge Velásquez	Warren A. Croll Jr.	Aisco Stable	1:36.60
1969	Tudor Queen	Avelino Gomez	Gil Rowntree	John H. Stafford	1:38.60
1968	Shuvee	Jesse Davidson	Willard C. Freeman	Anne Minor Stone	1:37.00
1967	Queen Of The Stage	Braulio Baeza	Edward A. Neloy	Ogden Phipps	1:35.40
1966	Regal Gleam	Manuel Ycaza	Hirsch Jacobs	Patrice Jacobs	1:37.40
1965	Priceless Gem	Walter Blum	Hirsch Jacobs	Ethel D. Jacobs	1:36.00
1964	Queen Empress	Bill Shoemaker	William C. Winfrey	Wheatley Stable	1:37.40
1963	Tosmah	Sam Boulmetis Sr.	Joseph W. Mergler	Briardale Farm	1:36.00
1962	Pams Ego	Manuel Ycaza	J. P. "Sammy" Smith	Clear Springs Stable	1:38.00
1961	Cicada	Bill Shoemaker	Casey Hayes	Meadow Stable	1:36.80
1960	Bowl of Flowers	Eddie Arcaro	J. Elliott Burch	Brookmeade Stable	1:35.60
1959	My Dear Girl	M. N. Gonzales	Melvin Calvert	Frances A. Genter	1:40.20
1958	Merry Hill	Ray Broussard	Woody Stephens	Joan Van de Maele	1:46.40
1957	Idun	Bill Hartack	Sherrill W. Ward	Josephine Bay	1:46.80
1956	Capelet	Jimmy Nichols	Lucien Laurin	Reginald N. Webster	1:45.40
1955	Nasrina	William Boland	Edward A. Christmas	Howell E. Jackson	1:45.40
1954	Myrtle's Jet	Walter Blum	Isaac K. Mourar	Maine Chance Farm	1:49.20
1953	Indian Legend	Ted Atkinson	John M. Gaver Sr.	Greentree Stable	1:13.60
1952	Sweet Patootie	Ted Atkinson	H. H. "Pete" Battle	Mrs. E. Dale Shaffer	1:12.40
1948	Our Fleet	Eddie Arcaro	Ted D. Grimes	Fannie Hertz	1:01.00
1947	Slumber Song	Jack Westrope	Preston M. Burch	Brookmeade Stable	1:12.20
1946	Bimlette	Abelardo DeLara	James W. Smith	John R. Bradley	1:12.60
1945	Bonnie Beryl	James Stout	James Fitzsimmons	Belair Stud	1:11.80

== See also ==
- Road to the Kentucky Oaks
