= Groovy (horse) =

American-bred Thoroughbred racehorse

- Sire: Norcliffe
- Grandsire: Buckpasser
- Dam: Tinnitus
- Damsire: Restless Wind
- Sex: Stallion
- Foaled: 1983
- Country: United States
- Colour: Chestnut
- Breeder: Marshall T. Robinson
- Owner: 1) Edith Libutti; 2) Theodore V. Kruckel; 3) Theodore V. Kruckel & John A. Ballis; 4) Lone Star Stable; 5) Prestonwood Farm
- Trainer: 1) Edward J. Yowell; 2) Mervin Marks; 3) Heliodoro Gustines; 4) John B. Adams; 5) Kimberly Hardy; 6) Petro Peters; 7) Howard Crowell; 8) Jose A. Martin
- Record: 26: 12-4-1
- Earnings: US$1,346,956

Major wins
- Forever Casting Stakes (1985); Ancient Title Handicap (1986); Firecracker Stakes (1986); Forego Handicap (1986, 1987); Spectacular Bid Stakes (1986); Tom Fool Stakes (1986, 1987); True North Handicap (1987); Vosburgh Stakes (1987)

Awards
- American Champion Sprint Horse (1987)
- Last updated on 19 February 2022

Groovy (1983–2006) was an American Thoroughbred Champion sprint racehorse known for his love of jelly donuts. He is the only horse to break the 130 Beyer Speed Figure, accomplishing that milestone in his first two starts of 1987. In the Roseben Handicap at Belmont Racetrack, he earned a 131 rating, which he followed up with a 134 in the True North Handicap.

Bred in Texas by Marshall T. Robinson, Groovy was out of the mare Tinnitus and sired by 1976 Canadian Horse of the Year Norcliffe, who was a son of U.S. Racing Hall of Fame inductee Buckpasser. Groovy was purchased at auction in February 1985 for $81,000 by Edith Libutti, the daughter of agent Ralph Libutti. Two months later, she sold the colt to New Jersey banker Theodore V. Kruckel.

== Racing at age two ==
Groovy was handled by several trainers during his race conditioning period and his first season of racing. Trainer Jack Adams believed that the horse could not successfully compete at distances of more than seven furlongs, but Groovy's owner dreamed of running in the mile and a quarter Kentucky Derby and replaced Adams. Kimberly Hardy saddled the colt in his racing debut on September 2, 1985, and won the Forever Casting Stakes at Meadowlands Racetrack at a distance of six furlongs. With Adams back as trainer, Groovy raced four more times that year, with his best results coming at Belmont Park, where he ran second in both the Grade I Champagne Stakes (9¾ lengths behind winner Mogambo) and the Futurity Stakes. In each of these races Groovy took the lead from the start and tired badly.

== Racing at age three ==
Making his 1986 debut at Florida's Gulfstream Park on January 8, 1986, Groovy won the Spectacular Bid Stakes at six furlongs. Before his next start, Houston, Texas, real estate developer John Ballis paid $1 million for a half-interest in the horse. Groovy was then shipped from Florida to New York. There, under Petro Peters, his sixth trainer, he lost three straight races but ran third in the Wood Memorial Invitational Stakes.

== Triple Crown ==
Trainer Peters was replaced by Howard Crowell, and Groovy's owners sent him to run in the Kentucky Derby. In that race, the colt immediately took the lead and held it for the first three-quarters of a mile before tiring badly and finishing sixteenth and last, 49 lengths behind winner Ferdinand. However, his owners entered him in the mile and three-sixteenths Preakness Stakes. Once again, the distance was too much and Groovy finished sixth in a seven-horse field. He did not run him in the mile and a half Belmont Stakes, the final leg of the U.S. Triple Crown series.

== Eighth and last trainer ==
In June 1986, a month after the Preakness, Groovy's owners turned his race conditioning over to Jose Martin, who had trained Lakeville Miss, the American Champion Two-Year-Old Filly of 1977, as well as Wayward Lass, the 1981 American Champion Three-Year-Old Filly. Martin accepted the job on the understanding that he would decide which races the colt competed in. Martin entered Groovy in the July 4 Firecracker Stakes, a six-furlong sprint at Belmont Park, which he won by 2¾ lengths. On July 20, Groovy won the seven-furlong Tom Fool Stakes, a Grade II event at Belmont Park. He followed this up with another Grade II win in the seven-furlong Forego Handicap at Saratoga Race Course. Stretched to one mile (8 furlongs) in the Jerome Handicap, Groovy finished fourth. Now firmly fixed as a sprint horse, he was shipped to California to prepare for the November 1, 1986, Breeders' Cup Sprint. In a tune-up on October 15, he won the six-furlong Ancient Title Handicap at Santa Anita Park in the time of 1:08 1/5. On the same track and at the same distance, Groovy was sent off as the overwhelming favorite to win the Breeders' Cup Sprint but finished fourth, 2½ lengths behind winner Smile. Following another fourth-place finish in the November 15 Sport Page Handicap at Aqueduct Racetrack, X-rays revealed that Groovy had a bone chip in the right knee that required surgery.

== Four-year-old season ==
At the end of Groovy's 1986 racing campaign, John Ballis bought out his partner's half-interest in the horse for $950,000 and raced under the name Lone Star Stable. Recovery from surgery saw Groovy out of racing for nearly seven months. He returned on June 6, 1987, to win the Roseben Handicap at Belmont Park by 4¾ lengths, receiving a Beyer Speed Figure of 131. In the June 21 True North Handicap at Belmont Park, while carrying high weight, Groovy established a track record of 1:07 4/5 for six furlongs on dirt and earned a Beyer Speed figure of 134 on a muddy track. He then won the July 5 Breeders' Cup Stakes at Farmington, New York's Finger Lakes Race Track, setting another track record for six furlongs on dirt with a time of 1:09 2/5. After he won the July 18 Tom Fool Stakes for the second year in a row and his fourth race in four 1987 starts, John Ballis sold Groovy for $4 million to the Prestonwood Farm of brothers Jack, Art and J.R. Preston. For his new owners, Groovy won his next two starts, including the Grade I Vosburgh Stakes on October 10. Undefeated for the year, Groovy was again the heavy favorite to win November's Breeders' Cup Sprint, hosted in 1987 by Hollywood Park Racetrack. In his last race, for the second straight year Groovy was upset in the Breeders' Cup Sprint, finishing second by four lengths to the filly Very Subtle. Groovy was a leading contender for American Horse of the Year honors, and this loss may have cost him the title. However, he was voted the Eclipse Award as the 1987 American Champion Sprint Horse.

== As a sire ==
Groovy stood at stud at Prestonwood Farm in Kentucky for eleven seasons and two more for the farm's new owners, who operate as WinStar Farm. He sired more than 220 winners, of which 18 were stakes winners. The top earner among his progeny at $636,664 was Brutally Frank (b. 1994), whose wins included the Grade 1 Carter Handicap.

Groovy was pensioned in 2001 due to neurological issues. On January 26, 2006, at age twenty-three, he was humanely euthanized at WinStar Farms due to infirmities of old age.

Pedigree of Groovy
Sire Norcliffe	Buckpasser	Tom Fool	Menow
Sire Norcliffe	Buckpasser	Tom Fool	Gaga
Sire Norcliffe	Buckpasser	Busanda	War Admiral
Sire Norcliffe	Buckpasser	Busanda	Businesslike
Sire Norcliffe	Drama School	Northern Dancer	Nearctic
Sire Norcliffe	Drama School	Northern Dancer	Natalma
Sire Norcliffe	Drama School	Stalina	Stalino
Sire Norcliffe	Drama School	Stalina	Boscabell
Dam Tinnitus	Restless Wind	Windy City	Wyndham
Dam Tinnitus	Restless Wind	Windy City	Staunton
Dam Tinnitus	Restless Wind	Lump Sugar	Bull Lea
Dam Tinnitus	Restless Wind	Lump Sugar	Sugar Run
Dam Tinnitus	Dors	Corporal	Court Martial
Dam Tinnitus	Dors	Corporal	Carmen
Dam Tinnitus	Dors	Cathy	Challenger
Dam Tinnitus	Dors	Cathy	Flag Trick
