= Points Offthebench =

American-bred Thoroughbred racehorse

- Sire: Benchmark
- Grandsire: Alydar
- Dam: Mo Chuisle
- Damsire: Free House
- Sex: Gelding
- Foaled: February 27, 2009
- Country: United States
- Colour: Dark Bay or Brown
- Breeder: Gary Rocks
- Owner: Donnie Crevier & Charles V Martin
- Trainer: Tim Yakteen
- Record: 8:6-1-1
- Earnings: $514,940

Major wins
- Bing Crosby Stakes (2013); Santa Anita Sprint Championship (2013)

Awards
- American Champion Sprint Horse (2013)

Points Offthebench (February 27, 2009 – October 26, 2013) was an American Thoroughbred racehorse best known for his performances over sprint distances. Campaigned exclusively in California, he was lightly raced in his early career, running twice a two-year-old in 2011 and once in the following year. As a four-year-old in 2013 he began by racing against moderate opposition before emerging as one of the best sprinters in North America with Grade I victories in the Bing Crosby Stakes and the Santa Anita Sprint Championship. Preparing for the Breeders' Cup, he fractured his leg during a workout and was euthanized. At the end of the year, he was posthumously named American Champion Sprint Horse.

== Background ==
Points Offthebench was a lightly made dark bay or brown gelding with a white star bred in California by Gary Rocks. He was sired by Benchmark, a multiple graded stakes winner who had previously sired the Grade I winners Brother Derek (Santa Anita Derby) and Idiot Proof (Ancient Title Stakes). Points Offthebench is the second foal of the unraced mare Mo Chuisle: her first foal, Bench Points, won five races including the Grade III Lazaro Barrera Memorial Stakes. During his racing career, Points Offthebench was owned by Donnie Crievier and Charles V. Martin and trained by Tim Yakteen. He was considered a major contender for the Breeders' Cup Sprint but was fatally injured in a training accident at Santa Anita Park on October 26. Three months later, he was named American Champion Sprint Horse for 2013.

== Racing career ==
=== 2011: two-year-old season ===
Points Offthebench made two appearances as a two-year-old, both of them on the Polytrack surface at Del Mar Racetrack in August. He began in a five and a half furlong maiden race in which he started at odds of 4.1/1 and finished third of eight runners. Eighteen days later he appeared in a similar event over six furlongs in which he was ridden, as on his debut, by the Mexican jockey Alonso Quinonez. Starting the 2.4/1 second favorite, he raced just behind the leaders before taking the lead in the straight and winning by one and a quarter lengths.

=== 2012: three-year-old season ===
Points Offthebench began his second season in a six-and-a-half-furlong Optional claiming race on the dirt at Santa Anita Park on February 17. Ridden by Joel Rosario, he tracked the odds-on favorite, Three Vases, before taking the lead on the final turn and drawing away in the closing stages to win by two and a quarter lengths. He did not race again in 2012.

=== 2013: four-year-old season ===
Almost a year after his last race, Points Offthebench returned in a six-furlong claiming race at Santa Anita in which he finished second by half a length to the favored Italian Rules. In April, he was ridden by Tyler Baze in another claimer over six and a half furlongs at the same track and started second favorite at odds of 2.2/1 in a field of ten runners. He raced just behind the leaders before taking the lead in the straight and holding off the challenge of the favorite, Oliver's Tale, to win by half a length. The gelding remained in claiming company for his next race over six furlongs at Hollywood Park Racetrack on May 27. Ridden again by Baze, he took the lead in the straight and went clear in the closing stages to win by two and a quarter lengths from Cyclometer, with the favored Italian Rules a neck away in third.

Points Offthebench was then moved up sharply in class for the Grade I Bing Crosby Stakes over six furlongs at Del Mar on July 28 in which he was ridden for the first time by Mike Smith. The gelding was fourth choice in the betting for the race behind previous Grade I winners Goldencents (Santa Anita Derby), Jimmy Creed (Malibu Stakes), and Comma to the Top (CashCall Futurity). Points Offthebench tracked the leaders before moving up on the outside to take the lead entering the straight. In the closing stages, he was challenged by Goldencents but prevailed by a head, with a gap of over three lengths back to Jimmy Creed in third. Tim Yakteen, who recorded the first Grade I success of his eight-year training career, commented: "He was training great, we drew a great post and he was ready for the task, so I felt confident going into the race. He ran huge and Mike gave him a great ride."

On October 5 at Santa Anita, Points Offthebench met Goldencents again in the Santa Anita Sprint Championship (formerly the Ancient Title Stakes) in a field which also included Breeders' Cup Sprint winner Trinniberg. Ridden again by Smith, the gelding moved up on the outside on the turn before overtaking the leader Distinctiv Passion in the final furlong. Despite lugging towards the inside in the closing stages, he held on to win by half a length from Goldencents. After the race, Smith commented: "He has some turn of foot, and I hit the front too soon, but he still held on. He pulled up nice and happy, well within himself. He's a very talented horse."

After four consecutive wins, including two at Grade I level, Points Offthebench was considered a leading contender for the Breeders' Cup Sprint at Santa Anita on November. In a routine four-furlong workout at the track on October 26, the gelding was approaching the sixteenth pole when he broke down on his right foreleg with what was described as "an inordinately loud, sickening sound". He had sustained a condlyar fracture to his right foreleg and was euthanized within fifteen minutes. His owner, Charles Martin, said, "He's been a tremendous horse. He was the nicest horse you would ever find... He was as much a pet as an awesome racehorse... everyone in the barn is devastated".

== Assessment and honors ==
On January 18, 2014, almost three month after his death, Points Offthebench was named American Champion Sprint Horse at the Eclipse Awards, taking 125 of the 249 votes. He was the first horse to be posthumously awarded an Eclipse Award since Left Bank in 2002. In the 2013 World's Best Racehorse Rankings, Points Offthebench was given a rating of 117, making him the highest-rated sprinter competing on dirt.

== Pedigree ==
Pedigree of Points Offthebench (USA), dark bay or brown gelding, 2009
Sire Benchmark (USA) 1991	Alydar (USA); 1975	Raise a Native	Native Dancer
Sire Benchmark (USA) 1991	Alydar (USA); 1975	Raise a Native	Raise You
Sire Benchmark (USA) 1991	Alydar (USA); 1975	Sweet Tooth	On-and-On
Sire Benchmark (USA) 1991	Alydar (USA); 1975	Sweet Tooth	Plum Cake
Sire Benchmark (USA) 1991	Winters Love (USA); 1982	Danzig	Northern Dancer
Sire Benchmark (USA) 1991	Winters Love (USA); 1982	Danzig	Pas de Nom
Sire Benchmark (USA) 1991	Winters Love (USA); 1982	Cold Hearted	The Axe
Sire Benchmark (USA) 1991	Winters Love (USA); 1982	Cold Hearted	Turn to North
Dam Mo Chuisle (USA) 2004	Free House (USA); 1994	Smokester	Never Tabled
Dam Mo Chuisle (USA) 2004	Free House (USA); 1994	Smokester	Small World
Dam Mo Chuisle (USA) 2004	Free House (USA); 1994	Fountain Lake	Vigors
Dam Mo Chuisle (USA) 2004	Free House (USA); 1994	Fountain Lake	Hotsie Totsie
Dam Mo Chuisle (USA) 2004	Visible Gold (CAN); 1988	Deputy Minister	Vice Regent
Dam Mo Chuisle (USA) 2004	Visible Gold (CAN); 1988	Deputy Minister	Mint Copy
Dam Mo Chuisle (USA) 2004	Visible Gold (CAN); 1988	Fit and Fancy	Vaguely Noble
Dam Mo Chuisle (USA) 2004	Visible Gold (CAN); 1988	Fit and Fancy	Alma North (Family: 9-c)
