= Golden Attraction =

American Thoroughbred racemare

- Sire: Mr. Prospector
- Grandsire: Raise a Native
- Dam: Seaside Attraction
- Damsire: Seattle Slew
- Sex: Mare
- Foaled: 1993
- Country: United States
- Colour: Bay
- Breeder: Overbrook Farm
- Owner: Overbrook Farm
- Trainer: D. Wayne Lukas
- Record: 11: 8-1-1
- Earnings: US$911,508

Major wins
- Spinaway Stakes (1995); Frizette Stakes (1995); Matron Stakes (1995); Schuylerville Stakes (1995); Debutante Stakes (1995); Turfway Breeders' Cup Stakes (1996)

Awards
- American Champion Two-Year-Old Filly (1995)

Golden Attraction (foaled 1993 in Kentucky) is an American Thoroughbred racemare who in 1995 won five important stakes races, including three Grade I events, and was voted American Champion Two-Year-Old Filly. She was bred and raced by William Young's Overbrook Farm and trained by U.S. Racing Hall of Fame inductee, D. Wayne Lukas.
