= Wayward Lass =

American-bred Thoroughbred racehorse

- Sire: Hail the Pirates
- Grandsire: Hail To Reason
- Dam: Young Mistress
- Damsire: Third Martini
- Sex: mare
- Foaled: 1978
- Country: United States
- Colour: Dark Bay/Brown
- Breeder: Horatio Luro
- Owner: Flying Zee Stable
- Trainer: Jose A. Martin
- Record: 25: 9-7-6
- Earnings: US$435,237

Major wins
- Schuylkill Stakes (1980); Coaching Club American Oaks (1981); Mother Goose Stakes (1981); Busanda Stakes (1981); Searching Stakes (1981); Ruthless Stakes (1981)

Awards
- American Champion Three-Year-Old Filly (1981)

Honours
- Wayward Lass Stakes at Tampa Bay Downs

Wayward Lass (April 13, 1978 – July 10, 2003) was an American Thoroughbred Champion racehorse. Bred in Florida by Hall of Fame trainer Horatio Luro, Wayward Lass was bought in 1980 by Carl Lizza, Jr. for $30,000 at the then-Florida Breeders Sales Co. She was raced under the nom de course, Flying Zee Stable, a racing partnership between Lizza, Jr. and Herbert Hochreiter, partners in a Long Island, New York heavy-construction company.

== Racing at two ==
Wayward Lass made her racing debut at Belmont Park in Elmont, New York in June 1980 for trainer Jose Martin. However, the filly did not get her first win until her eighth start in October at Belmont Park but then won her next outing, the Schuylkill Stakes at Keystone Race Track in Bensalem, Pennsylvania.

== U.S. Champion at three ==
In 1981, Wayward Lass won seven of thirteen starts with two seconds and four thirds. After finishing third in her first start of the year, she reeled off three very impressive wins at Aqueduct Racetrack in Queens, New York. He first win was by 7 lengths in the January 17 Busanda Stakes, followed by a 12½ length victory two weeks later in the Searching Stakes and then a win on February 15 by 11¾ lengths in the Ruthless Stakes.

At Belmont Park in June 1981, Wayward Lass won the Grades I Mother Goose Stakes at a mile and an eighth, and the Coaching Club American Oaks at a mile and a half.

Retired at the end of September, Wayward Lass was voted the 1981 Eclipse Award for American Champion Three-Year-Old Filly.

== A $2.35 million broodmare ==
In 1982, Wayward Lass was bred to In Reality and gave birth to a filly on March 13, 1983. Bred next to Noble Nashua, a stallion owned by Flying Zee Stable who then sold her in foal at the November 1983 Keeneland Sales for $2.35 million. The resulting filly, and the thirteen other foals Wayward Lass produced, met with little success in racing.

While in foal to City Zip, Wayward Lass died of a heart attack on July 10, 2003 at Gus Schoenborn Jr.'s Contemporary Stallions near Coxsackie, New York.
