= Red God =

American Thoroughbred racehorse

- Sire: Nasrullah
- Grandsire: Nearco
- Dam: Spring Run
- Damsire: Menow
- Sex: Stallion
- Foaled: 1954
- Country: United States
- Colour: Chestnut
- Breeder: Harry F. Guggenheim
- Owner: Harry F. Guggenheim
- Trainer: Cecil Boyd-Rochfort (England)
- Record: 14: 5-2-0
- Earnings: $37,389 & £3,062

Major wins
- Richmond Stakes (1956); Roseben Handicap (1958)

Red God (15 February 1954 – 8 February 1979) was a Thoroughbred race horse foaled in Kentucky who competed in England and the United States but who is best known as the sire of Blushing Groom, who like his sire was a champion miler and who prominent turfman Edward L. Bowen calls one of the great international sires of the 20th century.

== Racing career ==
At age two, Red God won the Richmond Stakes at Goodwood Racecourse and was second in the Champagne Stakes at Doncaster Racecourse after which he was brought back to the United States with plans to enter him in the American Triple Crown series. He won his American debut but was injured and out of racing for the rest of 1957. He returned to the track in 1958, with his best result a win in the Roseben Handicap at Belmont Park.

== Stud record ==
Retired from racing, in 1960 Red God was sent to stand at Loughtown Stud in County Kildare, Ireland. Here he sired 10 stakes winners for 13 stakes wins with over £1 million in earnings.
