= Andrew Beyer =

American gambling expert (born 1943)

Andrew (Andy) Beyer
- Born: November 17, 1943 (age 82); Carbondale, Illinois, U.S.
- Education: Harvard University
- Occupation: Writer
- Spouses: Susan A. Vallon
- Writing career
- Period: 1966–present
- Genre: Sports

Andrew Beyer (born November 17, 1943) is an American expert on horse race betting who designed the Beyer Speed Figure.

Born in Carbondale, Illinois, he attended Harvard and wrote for the school paper, the Crimson, before committing to full time betting.

In the early 1970s, while working for the Washington Daily News, Beyer did extensive work on the concept of speed figures and wrote books that helped popularize their use. By calculating variables such as the track conditions and the horse's time, Beyer speed figures give a measure of how fast a horse was in a given race. This number can then be used to compare a given horse's "speed" against its competition in an upcoming race, despite the fact that the horses have all run in different races, at different tracks, and are different calibers of horses. Speed figures have come into general usage and many racing forms include them in their publications.

Andrew Beyer is the author of four books on racing and was The Washington Post's horse racing columnist from 1978 to his retirement in 2016. He has been honored with the Walter Haight Award for career excellence by the National Turf Writers and Broadcasters and with a place on the Joe Hirsch Honor Roll at the National Museum of Racing and Hall of Fame. In 2017 he was presented with the Eclipse Award of Merit, the highest honor bestowed by the Thoroughbred industry. He was a member of the class of 1965 at Harvard University.

== In popular culture ==
Beyer was portrayed by Eric Lange in the 2010 film Secretariat.
