= Mogambo (horse) =

American-bred Thoroughbred racehorse

Mogambo (foaled 1983 in Kentucky) is a retired American Thoroughbred racehorse whose wins included a nine-length victory in the Grade I Champagne Stakes at Belmont Park in Elmont, New York. Bred and raced by Peter M. Brant, Mogambo was sired by the outstanding Champion stallion, Mr. Prospector. His dam was Lakeville Miss, the American Champion Two-Year-Old Filly of 1977.

Trained by National Museum of Racing and Hall of Fame inductee LeRoy Jolley, Mogambo retired having won four of his nineteen starts with earnings of $958,176.

== Stud career ==
Mogambo's descendants include:

c = colt, f = filly

Foaled	Name	Sex	Major Wins
1989	Gary Gumbo	c	Riggs Handicap, Rutgers Handicap
1989	Natural Nine	c	Silver Screen Handicap, Bradbury Stakes
1989	Anh Duong	f	Matron Stakes
1990	Nasr Allah	c	Bénazet-Rennen
1991	Life's Luck	c	Schwarzgold-Rennen
1996	Belmont Actor	c	Santa Anita Trophy, Funabashi Memorial
1998	Ten Litre	c	Takasaki Grand Prix, Takasaki Memorial

== Pedigree ==
Pedigree of Mogambo, 2012
Sire Mr. Prospector (USA) 1970	Raise a Native (USA); 1961	Native Dancer	Polynesian
Sire Mr. Prospector (USA) 1970	Raise a Native (USA); 1961	Native Dancer	Geisha
Sire Mr. Prospector (USA) 1970	Raise a Native (USA); 1961	Raise Your	Case Ace
Sire Mr. Prospector (USA) 1970	Raise a Native (USA); 1961	Raise Your	Lady Glory
Sire Mr. Prospector (USA) 1970	Gold Digger (USA); 1962	Nashua	Nasrullah
Sire Mr. Prospector (USA) 1970	Gold Digger (USA); 1962	Nashua	Segula
Sire Mr. Prospector (USA) 1970	Gold Digger (USA); 1962	Sequence	Count Fleet
Sire Mr. Prospector (USA) 1970	Gold Digger (USA); 1962	Sequence	Miss Dogwood
Dam Lakeville Miss (USA) 1975	Rainy Lake (USA); 1959	Royal Charger	Nearco
Dam Lakeville Miss (USA) 1975	Rainy Lake (USA); 1959	Royal Charger	Sun Princess
Dam Lakeville Miss (USA) 1975	Rainy Lake (USA); 1959	Portage	War Admiral
Dam Lakeville Miss (USA) 1975	Rainy Lake (USA); 1959	Portage	Carillon
Dam Lakeville Miss (USA) 1975	Hew (USA); 1959	Blue Prince	Princequillo
Dam Lakeville Miss (USA) 1975	Hew (USA); 1959	Blue Prince	Blue Denim
Dam Lakeville Miss (USA) 1975	Hew (USA); 1959	Jitsa	Questionnaire
Dam Lakeville Miss (USA) 1975	Hew (USA); 1959	Jitsa	Fair Perdita
