= Lakeville Miss =

American-bred Thoroughbred racehorse

- Sire: Rainy Lake
- Grandsire: Royal Charger
- Dam: Hew
- Damsire: Blue Prince
- Sex: Mare
- Foaled: 1975
- Country: United States
- Colour: Dark Bay/Brown
- Breeder: Randolph Weinsier
- Owner: 1) Randolph Weinsier; 2) Peter M. Brant
- Trainer: Jose A. Martin
- Record: 14: 7-4-1
- Earnings: US$371,582

Major wins
- Astarita Stakes (1977); Selima Stakes (1977); Matron Stakes (1977); Frizette Stakes (1977); Constitution Stakes (1978); Coaching Club American Oaks (1978)

Awards
- American Champion Two-Year-Old Filly (1977)

Lakeville Miss (foaled 1975 in Kentucky) was an American Thoroughbred Champion racehorse bred and raced by Great Neck, New York businessman Randolph Weinsier who in 1979 received the P.A.B. Widener Trophy for outstanding achievements in breeding.

== A Champion at two ==
Trained by Jose Martin, in 1977 Lakeville Miss won five of her eight starts including three Grade I races and was voted American Champion Two-Year-Old Filly honors.

== Her fourth Grade I win at three ==
Lakeville Miss won the 1978 Constitution Stakes at Keystone Race Track and in her final career start, the Grade I Coaching Club American Oaks at Belmont Park on July 1 after which she was sold to Peter Brant. For Brant, Lakeville Miss served broodmare duty and most significantly produced Mogambo, a Grade I winner of US$958,176.
