= Matron Stakes (NYRA) =

- Class: Grade III
- Location: Belmont Park; Elmont, New York, United States
- Inaugurated: 1892
- Race type: Thoroughbred – Flat racing
- Website: www.nyra.com

Race information
- Distance: 6 furlongs
- Surface: Turf
- Track: left-handed
- Qualification: Two-year-old fillies
- Weight: Assigned
- Purse: $150,000

The Matron Stakes is an American Thoroughbred horse race held annually during the fall season at Belmont Park, the New York Racing Association (NYRA) track in Elmont, Long Island, New York. It is open to two-year-old fillies and is the filly counterpart to the Belmont Futurity Stakes.

The Matron Stakes was run over a straight course before 1959, with the exception of 1941. Always a race for two-year-old horses, it has been run under different conditions four times:

- 1892–1901 : on dirt, open to both colts and fIllies
- 1902–1914 : on dirt, a division for colts and geldings and a division for fillies
- 1915–2017 : on dirt, for fillies only
- 2018–present : on turf, for fillies only

The inaugural race took place at Morris Park Racecourse in The Bronx, New York where it remained until 1905 when it was moved to the new Belmont Park. Through special arrangements, in 1910 it was hosted by Pimlico Race Course in Baltimore, Maryland. The NYRA's Aqueduct Racetrack hosted the event in 1960 and again from 1962 to 1968.

There was no race held from 1895 to 1898 and as a result of the passage of New York state's Hart–Agnew Law that banned parimutuel wagering, from 1911 to 1913. The race was placed on hiatus from 1915 to 1922. When it was revived in 1923 as part of the Belmont Park schedule, the Matron was won by the Greentree Stable filly Tree Top who beat twelve other competitors. Runner-up Nellie Morse went on to win the 1924 Preakness Stakes and earn American Champion Three-Year-Old Filly honors. The third-place finisher, Princess Doreen, would have a career that saw her win three National Championships and induction into the National Museum of Racing and Hall of Fame.

In 2001 the race was cancelled in observance of the September 11, 2001 attacks on the World Trade Center in New York City.

== Records ==
Speed record: (At distance of 7 furlongs)

- 1:22.80 – Meadow Star (1990)

Most wins by a jockey:

- 6 – Ángel Cordero Jr. (1974, 1980, 1983, 1987, 1989, 1991)

Most wins by a trainer:

- 9 – D. Wayne Lukas (1983, 1984, 1987, 1988, 1989, 1994, 1995, 1996, 2005)

Most wins by an owner:

- 7 – H. P. Whitney (1905 (2), 1907, 1909, 1910, 1926, 1929)

== Winners ==
Year	Winner	Jockey	Trainer	Owner	Distance	Time	Win$	Gr.
2026	Brickyard Belle	Manuel Franco	Miguel Clement	Brickyard Belle Racing, Beggs and Flowers and Briles Family Stable	6 F	1:08.26	$110,000	G3
2025	Final Accord	Junior Alvarado	Mark E. Casse	Gary Barber & Peter Deutsch	6 F	1:08.47	$175,000	G3
2024	Abientot	Dylan Davis	Mark E. Casse	Tracy Farmer	6 F	1:08.31	$96,250	G3
2023	Jody's Pride	Flavien Prat	Jorge R. Abreu	Parkland Thoroughbreds & Sportsmen Stable	6 F	1:10.77	$150,000	G3
2022	American Apple	Eric Cancel	Daniel Leitch	KatieRich Stables	6 F	1:09.59	$150,000	G3
2021	Bubble Rock	Irad Ortiz Jr.	Brad Cox	Shortleaf Stable	6 F	1:08.01	$82,500	G3
2019	Alms	Jose Lezcano	Michael Stidham	Godolphin, LLC	6 F	1:09.30	$82,500	G3
2018	Lonely Road	David Cohen	Christophe Clement	Robert S. Evans	6 F	1:10.88	$82,500	G3
2017	Happy Like A Fool	Tyler Gaffalione	Wesley A. Ward	Susan Magnier, Michael Tabor, Derrick Smith, Merriebelle Stable	6 F	1:10.98	$90,000	G3
2016	Arella Rockstar	Luis Saez	Rudy R. Rodriguez	e Five Racing Thoroughbreds & Magic Cap Stables	6 F	1:11.68	$120,000	G3
2015	Pretty N Cool	Martin Garcia	Bob Baffert	Karl Watson, Mike Pegram, Paul Weitman	6 F	1:09.73	$120,000	G2
2014	Paulassilverlining	José L. Ortiz	Michelle Nevin	Vincent S. Scuderi	6 F	1:10.86	$120,000	G2
2013	Miss Behaviour	Garry Cruise	Phil Schoenthal	Cal MacWilliam & Neil Teitelbaum	6 F	1:10.57	$120,000	G2
2012	Kauai Katie	Rosie Napravnik	Todd Pletcher	Stonestreet Stables	6 F	1:11.26	$120,000	G2
2011	Millionreasonswhy	John Velazquez	Ignacio Correas IV	Sagamore Farm	6 F	1:12.68	$90,000	G2
2010	no race							
2009	Awesome Maria	Cornelio Velásquez	Stanley M. Hough	E. Paul Robsham	7 F	1:23.07	$150,000	G2
2008	Doremifasollatido	Eibar Coa	James A. Jerkens	Susan B. Moore & M and M Thoroughbreds	7 F	1:24.74	$150,000	G2
2007	Proud Spell	Gabriel Saez	J. Larry Jones	Brereton C. Jones	7 F	1:24.20	$150,000	G2
2006	Meadow Breeze	Kent Desormeaux	Carl Deville	Willow Rock Stable	7 F	1:24.82	$150,000	G1
2005	Folklore	Edgar Prado	D. Wayne Lukas	Robert B. Lewis	7 F	1:23.70	$180,000	G1
2004	Sense of Style	Edgar Prado	Patrick Biancone	Michael Tabor & Derrick Smith	1 m	1:37.67	$120,000	G1
2003	Marylebone	Edgar Prado	Todd Pletcher	Michael Tabor	1 m	1:38.02	$120,000	G1
2002	Storm Flag Flying	John Velazquez	C. R. McGaughey III	Ogden Mills Phipps	1 m	1:38.52	$120,000	G1
2001	Race not held due to the September 11 attacks							
2000	Raging Fever	Jerry Bailey	Mark A. Hennig	Edward P. Evans	1 m	1:38.20	$120,000	G1
1999	Finder's Fee	Heberto Castillo Jr.	C. R. McGaughey III	Ogden Phipps	1 m	1:36.68	$90,000	G1
1998	Oh What a Windfall	Shane Sellers	C. R. McGaughey III	Ogden Phipps	1 m	1:39.29	$90,000	G1
1997	Beautiful Pleasure	Jerry Bailey	John T. Ward Jr.	John C. Oxley	1 m	1:35.71	$90,000	G1
1996	Sharp Cat	Jerry Bailey	D. Wayne Lukas	Thoroughbred Corp.	1 m	1:36.00	$90,000	G1
1995	Golden Attraction	Gary Stevens	D. Wayne Lukas	William T. Young	1 m	1:36.20	$90,000	G1
1994	Stormy Blues †	José A. Santos	Scotty Schulhofer	David & Harriet Finkelstein	1 m	1:35.00	$64,740	G1
1993	Strategic Maneuver	José A. Santos	Scotty Schulhofer	Philip Teinowitz & Scotty Schulhofer	7 F	1:23.80	$70,680	G1
1992	Sky Beauty	Eddie Maple	H. Allen Jerkens	Georgia E. Hofmann	7 F	1:23.20	$72,480	G1
1991	Anh Duong	Ángel Cordero Jr.	LeRoy Jolley	Peter M. Brant	7 F	1:23.40	$88,800	G1
1990	Meadow Star	José A. Santos	LeRoy Jolley	Carl Icahn	7 F	1:22.80	$93,240	G1
1989	Stella Madrid	Ángel Cordero Jr.	D. Wayne Lukas	Peter M. Brant	7 F	1:24.40	$72,720	G1
1988	Some Romance	Gary Stevens	D. Wayne Lukas	Eugene V. Klein	7 F	1:24.80	$68,580	G1
1987	Over All	Ángel Cordero Jr.	D. Wayne Lukas	Eugene V. Klein	7 F	1:24.80	$82,140	G1
1986	Tappiano	Jean Cruguet	Scotty Schulhofer	Frances A. Genter	7 F	1:23.40	$72,000	G1
1985	Musical Lark	Don MacBeth	Sidney Watters Jr.	Diana M. Firestone	7 F	1:24.00	$66,240	G1
1984	Fiesta Lady	Laffit Pincay Jr.	D. Wayne Lukas	Eugene V. Klein	7 F	1:24.80	$57,060	G1
1983	Lucky Lucky Lucky	Ángel Cordero Jr.	D. Wayne Lukas	Leslie Combs II	7 F	1:23.60	$76,590	G1
1982	Wings of Jove	Herb McCauley	Charles Sanborn	Helmore Farm	7 F	1:24.00	$72,600	G1
1981	Before Dawn	Jorge Velásquez	John M. Veitch	Calumet Farm	7 F	1:23.20	$81,210	G1
1980	Prayers'n Promises	Ángel Cordero Jr.	Lou Rondinello	Daniel M. Galbreath	7 F	1:24.60	$70,725	G1
1979	Smart Angle	Sam Maple	Woody Stephens	Ryehill Farm (Jim & Eleanor Ryan)	7 F	1:23.80	$69,075	G1
1978	Fall Aspen	Roger I. Velez	James E. Picou	Joseph M. Roebling	7 F	1:23.80	$58,980	G1
1977	Lakeville Miss	Ruben Hernandez	Jose A. Martin	Randolph Weinsier	7 F	1:22.80	$49,335	G1
1976	Mrs. Warren	Eddie Maple	Woody Stephens	Taylor Hardin	7 F	1:24.60	$51,162	G1
1975	Optimistic Gal	Braulio Baeza	LeRoy Jolley	Diana M. Firestone	7 F	1:23.00	$51,132	G1
1974	Alpine Lass	Ángel Cordero Jr.	John W. Russell	Ogden Mills Phipps	7 F	1:23.00	$52,674	G1
1973	Talking Picture	Ron Turcotte	John P. Campo	Elmendorf Farm	7 F	1:23.20	$64,050	G1
1972	La Prevoyante	Jean LeBlanc	Yonnie Starr	Jean-Louis Levesque	7 F	1:23.60	$59,874	
1971	Numbered Account	Braulio Baeza	Roger Laurin	Ogden Phipps	6 F	1:10.40	$60,306	
1970	Bonnie And Gay	Robert Woodhouse	James E. Picou	Adelaide (née Jones) Burgwin	6 F	1:11.00	$68,009	
1969	Cold Comfort	Jorge Velásquez	Willard Freeman	Alfred G. Vanderbilt II	6 F	1:11.60	$68,484	
1968	Gallant Bloom	Eddie Belmonte	Max Hirsch	King Ranch	6 F	1:10.40	$62,634	
1967	Queen of the Stage	Braulio Baeza	Edward A. Neloy	Ogden Phipps	6 F	1:10.00	$64,733	
1966	Swiss Cheese	John L. Rotz	Ivor G. Balding	C. V. Whitney	6 F	1:12.80	$68,659	
1965	Moccasin	Larry Adams	Harry Trotsek	Claiborne Farm	6 F	1:11.60	$67,717	
1964	Candalita	Bobby Ussery	Loyd Gentry Jr.	Darby Dan Farm	6 F	1:13.00	$63,681	
1963	Hasty Matelda	Jimmy Combest	Casey Hayes	Meadow Stable	6 F	1:12.00	$63,596	
1962	Smart Deb	Bobby Ussery	Arnold N. Winick	Marion Reineman	6 F	1:09.80	$63,869	
1961	Cicada	Bill Shoemaker	Casey Hayes	Meadow Stable	6 F	1:10.60	$61,028	
1960	Rose Bower	John L. Rotz	MacKenzie Miller	Charlton Clay	6 F	1:10.60	$58,634	
1959	Heavenly Body	Manuel Ycaza	Woody Stephens	Cain Hoy Stable	6 F	1:10.20	$58,224	
1958	Quill	Paul J. Bailey	Lucien Laurin	Reginald N. Webster	6 F	1:10.00	$42,610	
1957	Idun	Bill Hartack	Sherrill W. Ward	Josephine Bay	6 F	1:09.60	$42,900	
1956	Romanita	Eric Guerin	Frank Sanders	Reverie Knoll Farm (Freeman Keyes)	6 F	1:08.60	$43,020	
1955	Doubledogdare	Eddie Arcaro	Moody Jolley	Claiborne Farm	6 F	1:09.80	$48,620	
1954	High Voltage	Eddie Arcaro	Jim Fitzsimmons	Wheatley Stable	6 F	1:10.00	$49,330	
1953	Evening Out	Ovie Scurlock	Bert Mulholland	George D. Widener Jr.	6 F	1:10.40	$41,345	
1952	Is Proud	Conn McCreary	William J. Hirsch	Brookfield Farm	6 F	1:09.00	$40,960	
1951	Rose Jet	Hedley Woodhouse	Willie Booth	Maine Chance Farm	6 F	1:11.20	$44,830	
1950	Atlanta	Hedley Woodhouse	Preston M. Burch	Brookmeade Stable	6 F	1:12.00	$38,690	
1949	Bed o'Roses	Eric Guerin	Bill Winfrey	Alfred G. Vanderbilt II	6 F	1:12.00	$40,210	
1948	Myrtle Charm	Ted Atkinson	James W. Smith	Maine Chance Farm	6 F	1:10.60	$37,805	
1947	Inheritance ††	Job Dean Jessop	Preston M. Burch	Brookmeade Stable	6 F	1:10.20	$35,060	
1946	First Flight	Eddie Arcaro	Sylvester Veitch	C. V. Whitney	6 F	1:08.60	$35,535	
1945	Beaugay	Arnold Kirkland	Tom Smith	Maine Chance Farm	6 F	1:09.40	$23,500	
1944	Busher	Eddie Arcaro	James W. Smith	Edward R. Bradley	6 F	1:09.40	$23,500	
1943	Boojiana	Ted Atkinson	Sylvester Veitch	C. V. Whitney	6 F	1:09.80	$7,900	
1942	Good Morning	Herb Lindberg	Sammy Smith	Falaise Stable	6 F	1:09.20	$9,525	
1941	Petrify	Ruperto Donoso	Alfred Holberg	Alfred G. Vanderbilt II	6 F	1:11.60	$17,710	
1940	Misty Isle	Wayne D. Wright	Daniel E. Stewart	Joseph E. Widener	6 F	1:10.40	$15,710	
1939	Miss Ferdinand	Jack Westrope	John A. Healey	Christiana Stables	6 F	1:12.00	$14,825	
1938	Dinner Date	Alfred Robertson	Robert McGarvey	Milky Way Farm Stable	6 F	1:13.40	$16,700	
1937	Merry Lassie	Johnny Longden	Jim Fitzsimmons	Wheatley Stable	6 F	1:11.00	$10,900	
1936	Wand	Harry Richards	Preston M. Burch	Sarah F. Jeffords	6 F	1:11.00	$12,075	
1935	Beanie M.	Don Meade	Herbert J. Thompson	Edward R. Bradley	6 F	1:11.80	$11,900	
1934	Nellie Flag	Eddie Arcaro	Burton B. Williams	Calumet Farm	6 F	1:10.80	$20,550	
1933	High Glee	John Gilbert	Thomas J. Healey	C. V. Whitney	6 F	1:13.60	$18,800	
1932	Barn Swallow	Eugene James	Herbert J. Thompson	Edward R. Bradley	6 F	1:11.00	$20,575	
1931	Top Flight	Raymond Workman	Thomas J. Healey	C. V. Whitney	6 F	1:11.60	$23,750	
1930	Baba Kenny	Joseph Smith	Herbert J. Thompson	Edward R. Bradley	6 F	1:12.00	$24,650	
1929	Dustemall	Linus McAtee	James G. Rowe Jr.	H. P. Whitney	6 F	1:11.00	$25,250	
1928	Dreadnaught	Steve O'Donnell	H. Guy Bedwell	Samuel Ross	6 F	1:12.00	$21,725	
1927	Glade	George Ellis	James G. Rowe Sr.	Greentree Stable	6 F	1:12.60	$21,025	
1926	Pantella	Linus McAtee	Fred Hopkins	H. P. Whitney	6 F	1:13.40	$18,275	
1925	Taps	Albert Johnson	Gwyn R. Tompkins	Glen Riddle Farm	6 F	1:13.40	$15,075	
1924	Blue Warbler	David Hurn	Herbert J. Thompson	Idle Hour Stock Farm	6 F	1:13.80	$10,625	
1923	Tree Top	Frank Coltiletti	Scott P. Harlan	Greentree Stable	6 F	1:11.60	$4,150	
1915	– 1922	Race not held						
1914 (C)	Pebbles	James Butwell	Richard C. Benson	James Butler	6 F	1:15.00	$1,045	
1914 (F)	Charter Maid	John McTaggart	John E. Madden	John E. Madden	6 F	1:14.00	$1,130	
1911	– 1913	Race not held						
1910 (C)	Naushon	Buddy Glass	Thomas J. Healey	Richard T. Wilson Jr.	6 F	1:12.80	$9,485	
1910 (F)	Bashti	Clifford D. Gilbert	James G. Rowe Sr.	H. P. Whitney	6 F	1:13.00	$8,655	
1909 (C)	Radium Star	Jack Creevy	Thomas J. Healey	Montpelier Stable	6 F	1:15.80	$8,995	
1909 (F)	Greenvale	Clifford D. Gilbert	James G. Rowe Sr.	H. P. Whitney	6 F	1:15.00	$8,535	
1908 (C)	Helmet	Joe Notter	James G. Rowe Sr.	James R. Keene	6 F	1:12.40	$9,625	
1908 (F)	Maskette	Joe Notter	James G. Rowe Sr.	James R. Keene	6 F	1:20.80	$5,895	
1907 (C)	Colin	Walter Miller	James G. Rowe Sr.	James R. Keene	6 F	1:12.00	$9,340	
1907 (F)	Stamina	Willie Knapp	John W. Rogers	H. P. Whitney	6 F	1:11.80	$8,940	
1906 (C)	Ballot	Herman Radtke	James G. Rowe Sr.	James R. Keene	6 F	1:12.00	$10,250	
1906 (F)	Adoration	Walter Miller	Thomas J. Healey	Richard T. Wilson Jr.	6 F	1:11.80	$9,030	
1905 (C)	Burgomaster	Lucien Lyne	John W. Rogers	H. P. Whitney	6 F	1:12.20	$11,645	
1905 (F)	Perverse	Lucien Lyne	John W. Rogers	H. P. Whitney	6 F	1:11.20	$10,485	
1904 (C)	Bedouin	Willie Shaw	John Huggins	Edward W. Jewett	6 F	1:09.00	$12,725	
1904 (F)	Sandria	Gene Hildebrand	John W. Rogers	Herman B. Duryea	6 F	1:08.20	$13,345	
1903 (C)	The Minute Man	Frank O'Neill	John E. Madden	John E. Madden	6 F	1:09.60	$9,225	
1903 (F)	Armenia	Wallace Hicks	John W. Rogers	William C. Whitney	6 F	1:10.20	$5,525	
1902 (C)	Grey Friar	Nash Turner	William P. Burch	Francis R. Hitchcock	6 F	1:11.20	$12,180	
1902 (F)	Eugenia Burch	George Odom	Edward L. Graves	Libby Curtis	6 F	1:12.25	$6,790	
1901	Heno	George Odom	Charles E. Hill	Clarence Mackay	6 F	1:11.20	$17,593	
1900	Beau Gallant	John Bullman	Sam Hildreth	Sam Hildreth	6 F	1:10.20	$16,697	
1899	Indian Fairy	John Slack	Julius Bauer	Bromley & Co. (Joseph E. Bromley & Arthur Featherstone)	6 F	1:10.25	$16,697	
1895	– 1898	Race not held						
1894	Agitator	Fred Taral	William Lakeland	James R. & Foxhall P. Keene	6 F	1:11.00	$31,320	
1893	Domino	Fred Taral	William Lakeland	James R. & Foxhall P. Keene	6 F	1:09.00	$24,560	
1892	Sir Francis	Edward Garrison	Matthew M. Allen	Frank A. Ehret	6 F	1:10.00	$36,770	

- † In 1994, Flanders finished first but was disqualified.
- †† In 1947, Bewitch finished first but was disqualified.
