= Noble Nashua =

American Thoroughbred racehorse

- Sire: Nashua
- Grandsire: Nasrullah
- Dam: Noble Lady
- Damsire: Vaguely Noble
- Sex: Stallion
- Foaled: 1978
- Country: United States
- Colour: Bay
- Breeder: Grousemont Farm
- Owner: Flying Zee Stable
- Trainer: Jose A. Martin
- Record: 21: 10-1-1
- Earnings: US$678,427

Major wins
- Marlboro Cup Handicap (1981); Swaps Stakes (1981); Dwyer Stakes (1981); Jerome Handicap (1981); Whirlaway Stakes (1981)

Honours
- Noble Nashua Stakes at Belmont Park

Noble Nashua (1978–1992) was an American Thoroughbred racehorse bred in Kentucky by Theiline Scheumann's Grousemont Farm. Impeccably bred, he was sired by U.S. Racing Hall of Fame inductee Nashua and out of the mare Noble Lady, a daughter of Vaguely Noble, winner of the 1968 Prix de l'Arc de Triomphe and the 1973 and 1974 Leading sire in Great Britain and Ireland as well as their Leading broodmare sire in 1982.

== Major race wins ==
Noble Nashua was purchased for racing by the Flying Zee Stable of Carl Lizza Jr. and Herbert Hochreiter and trained by Jose Martin. In 1981, he won five important stakes races including the Grade I Swaps Stakes at Hollywood Park Racetrack and the Marlboro Cup Handicap at Belmont Park. He also set a stakes race and Belmont Park track record of 1:33 1/5 for one mile on dirt in winning the Jerome Handicap. His stakes record time still stands as at 2011. Further, Noble Nashua set a stakes record of 1:43 flat for a mile and a sixteenth on dirt in his Whirlaway Stakes victory at Aqueduct Racetrack, missing the track record by just one fifth of a second. His time stood for twenty-six years.

Noble Nashua was syndicated to a group of breeders for $11 million with Flying Zee Stable maintaining a significant interest.

== At stud ==
Noble Nashua sustained a leg injury during his second start on April 19, 1982, and was retired from racing. He was sent to stand at stud at Schoenborn Farm in Coxsackie, New York. Noble Nashua sired a number of good runners among which the top earner was Ballindaggin.

A problem with a twisted intestine led to Noble Nashua being humanely euthanized in September 1992 at age fourteen.

The Noble Nashua Stakes for New York State bred horses at Belmont Park is named in his honor.

== Pedigree ==
Pedigree of Noble Nashua
Sire Nashua	Nasrullah	Nearco	Pharos
Sire Nashua	Nasrullah	Nearco	Nogara
Sire Nashua	Nasrullah	Mumtaz Begum	Blenheim
Sire Nashua	Nasrullah	Mumtaz Begum	Mumtaz Mahal
Sire Nashua	Segula	Johnstown	Jamestown
Sire Nashua	Segula	Johnstown	La France
Sire Nashua	Segula	Sekhmet	Sardanapale
Sire Nashua	Segula	Sekhmet	Prosopopee
Dam Noble Lady	Vaguely Noble	Vienna	Aureole
Dam Noble Lady	Vaguely Noble	Vienna	Turkish Blood
Dam Noble Lady	Vaguely Noble	Noble Lassie	Nearco
Dam Noble Lady	Vaguely Noble	Noble Lassie	Belle Sauvage
Dam Noble Lady	Good Folks	Citation	Bull Lea
Dam Noble Lady	Good Folks	Citation	Hydroplane
Dam Noble Lady	Good Folks	Mother-In-Law	Count Fleet
Dam Noble Lady	Good Folks	Mother-In-Law	Matriarch
