= Roseben Handicap =

The Roseben Handicap was an American Thoroughbred horse race run annually from 1940 through 1995. Hosted by Belmont Park in Elmont, New York, it was open to horses age three and older. A Grade III event at the time of its cancellation, it was contested on dirt over a distance of six furlongs.

Inaugurated in 1940, it was named in honor of U.S. Racing Hall of Fame inductee, Roseben. The race was run at Aqueduct Racetrack from 1962 through 1982. During its tenure, it was contested at two distances:

- 6 F : 1940-1953, 1981-1995
- 7 F : 1954-1980

The 1977 race had to be canceled as a result of a strike action by unionized racetrack employees.

== Records ==
Speed record:

- at 6 furlongs:
  - 1:08.20 Up Beat (1949)
  - 1:08.20 For Really (1991)
- at 7 furlongs:
  - 1:21.00 Lord Rebeau (1976)

== Winners ==
- 1995 - Evil Bear
- 1994 - Boundary
- 1993 - Codys Key
- 1992 - Drummond Lane
- 1991 - For Really
- 1990 - Mr. Nickerson
- 1989 - Pok Ta Pok
- 1988 - High Brite
- 1987 - Groovy
- 1986 - I Am the Game
- 1985 - Hagley's Reward
- 1984 - Top Avenger
- 1983 - Swelegant
- 1982 - Gratification
- 1981 - Ring of Light
- 1980 - Dave's Friend
- 1979 - Nice Catch
- 1978 - Big John Taylor
- 1977 - No race
- 1976 - Lord Rebeau
- 1975 - Step Nicely
- 1974 - Torsion
- 1971 - Native Royalty
- 1970 - Reviewer
- 1969 - Terrible Tiger
- 1968 - Dr. Fager
- 1967 - Indulto
- 1966 - Bold Lad
- 1965 - National
- 1964 - Bonjour
- 1963 - George Barton
- 1962 - Rose Net
- 1958 - Red God
- 1957 - War Piper
- 1956 - First Aid
- 1955 - Red Hannigan
- 1954 - White Skies
- 1953 - Squared Away
- 1952 - Dark Peter
- 1951 - Delegate
- 1950 - Olympia
- 1949 - Up Beat
- 1948 - Rippey
- 1947 - Inroc
- 1946 - Polynesian
- 1945 - Salto
- 1944 - Cassis
- 1943 - Some Chance
- 1942 - Some Chance
- 1941 - Harvard Square
- 1940 - The Chief
