= LeRoy Jolley =

American horse trainer

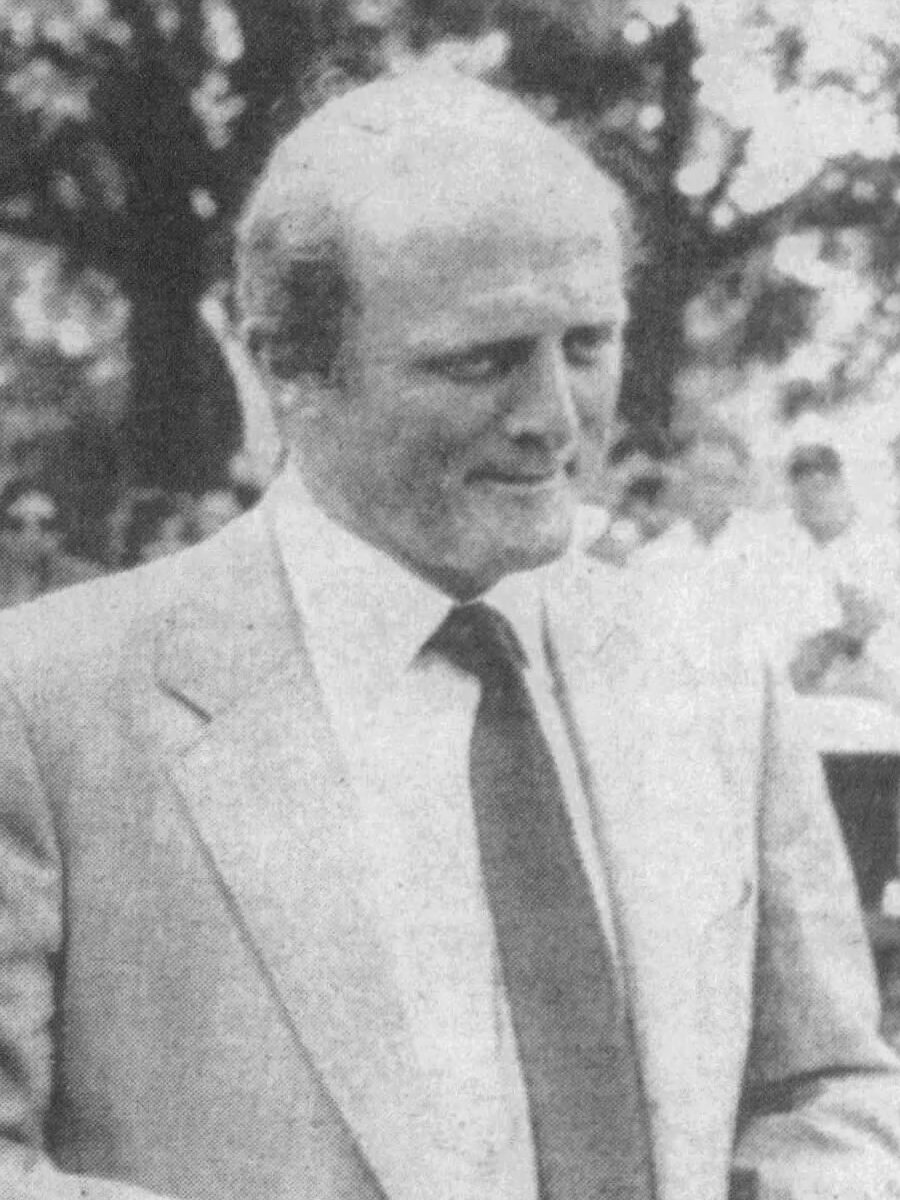
- Jolley, c. 1984

Personal information
- Born: January 14, 1938 Hot Springs, Arkansas, United States
- Died: December 18, 2017 (aged 79) Albany, New York, United States
- Occupation: Trainer

Horse racing career
- Sport: Horse racing
- Career wins: 991+

Major racing wins
- Hyde Park Stakes (1961); Arlington Classic (1962); Florida Derby (1962, 1976); Breeders' Futurity Stakes (1963, 1981); Blue Grass Stakes (1962, 1976, 1977); Lexington Stakes (1973, 1986); Manhattan Handicap (1973); Tremont Stakes (1974, 1983, 1986, 1989); Frizette Stakes (1975, 1990); Matron Stakes (1975, 1990, 1991); Wood Memorial Stakes (1975, 1987); Travers Stakes (1976, 1979); Juvenile Stakes (1977); Whitney Handicap (1977, 1985); Woodward Stakes (1985); United Nations Stakes (1986, 1987); Arlington Million (1987); Hollywood Derby (1987); Turf Classic Stakes (1987); Acorn Stakes (1991); Mother Goose Stakes (1991) American Classics / Breeders' Cup wins: Kentucky Derby (1975, 1980); Breeders' Cup Turf (1986); Breeders' Cup Juvenile Fillies (1990)

Honors
- National Museum of Racing and Hall of Fame (1987)

Significant horses
- Foolish Pleasure, General Assembly, Genuine Risk, Gulch, Honest Pleasure, Manila, Mogambo, Meadow Star, Ridan

LeRoy S. Jolley (January 14, 1938 – December 18, 2017) was an American Hall of Fame Thoroughbred horse trainer. The son of horse trainer Moody Jolley, LeRoy Jolley had been around horses all his life and at age nineteen received a New York State trainer's license.

In 1961, the 24-year-old LeRoy Jolley was the trainer of the colt Ridan who at age two went undefeated in seven races including wins in the Arlington Futurity and the Washington Park Futurity. Owned by his family along with two other partners, at age three Ridan gave LeRoy Jolley victory in record time in the Hibiscus Stakes, plus the first of his three Blue Grass Stakes wins. He then earned the first of his two Florida Derbys while defeating the future Hall of Fame filly, Cicada. The heavy favorite going into the Kentucky Derby, Ridan ran wide throughout the race and wound up third in a hard-fought race where he and Roman Line finished a neck behind upset winner Decidedly whom Ridan had easily beaten in the Blue Grass Stakes. In that year's Travers Stakes at the Saratoga Race Course, Ridan lost by a fraction of a nose to Jaipur in one of the most dramatic races in American Thoroughbred racing history and one that is still written and talked about today.

Jolley went on to train two Kentucky Derby winners, first with Foolish Pleasure in 1975 then with Genuine Risk in 1980. He won numerous other important American graded stakes races including the 1986 Breeders' Cup Turf and the 1987 Arlington Million with Manila plus the 1990 Breeders' Cup Juvenile Fillies with Meadow Star.

In 1987, LeRoy Jolley was inducted into the National Museum of Racing and Hall of Fame.
