= Jorge Velásquez =

American jockey

Jorge Velasquez
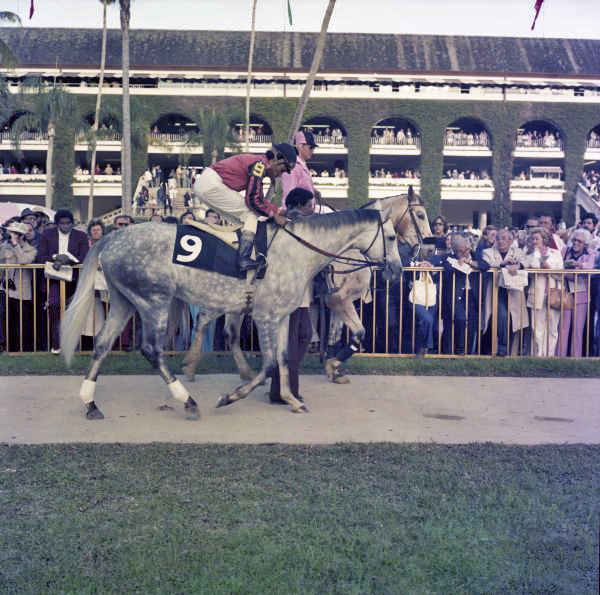
- Velasquez with "Sawbones" at Hialeah, February 25, 1978

Personal information
- Born: December 28, 1946 (age 79) Chepo, Panama
- Occupation: Jockey

Horse racing career
- Sport: Horse racing
- Career wins: 6,795

Major racing wins
- Carter Handicap (1968); Jerome Handicap (1968, 1969); Man O' War Stakes (1968, 1969, 1970, 1975, 1979); Wood Memorial Stakes (1969); J. A. Morris Handicap (1969, 1974, 1975, 1978, 1980); Remsen Stakes (1969, 1983); Matron Stakes (1969, 1981); United Nations Handicap (1969, 1970, 1973, 1974); Champagne Stakes (1970, 1977, 1978, 1980); Frizette Stakes (1970, 1976); Tremont Stakes (1970, 1981, 1985); Washington, D.C. International (1970, 1979); Discovery Handicap (1970, 1985); Sport Page Handicap (1970, 1974); Cowdin Stakes (1971, 1975, 1977, 1980, 1985); Jockey Club Gold Cup (1971, 1973, 1975); Stymie Handicap (1971, 1975, 1985, 1990); Whitney Handicap (1971, 1978); Beldame Stakes (1973, 1976, 1978, 1984, 1985); Gazelle Handicap (1973, 1978); Governor Stakes (1973); Palm Beach Handicap (1973); Toboggan Handicap (1973, 1976, 1989); Woodward Stakes (1973); Hawthorne Gold Cup Handicap (1974); Lawrence Realization Stakes (1974); American Oaks (1974, 1976, 1979, 1988); Canadian International Stakes (1975, 1981); Royal Palm Handicap (1975, 1987); Saratoga Special Stakes (1975, 1985); Withers Stakes (1977, 1980, 1986); Blue Grass Stakes (1978); Spinster Stakes (1978); Travers Stakes (1978); Florida Derby (1978, 1985); Beaugay Handicap (1978, 1983, 1991, 1993); Black-Eyed Susan Stakes (1979); Black Helen Handicap (1979, 1981); Turf Classic Invitational Stakes (1979); Kentucky Oaks (1979); Garden City Handicap (1980, 1982); Hudson Stakes (NYB) (1981, 1983, 1985); Super Derby (1982); Comely Stakes (1982, 1988); Flower Bowl Invitational Stakes (1983); Santa Anita Derby (1983); Astoria Stakes (1985); Hollywood Derby (1985) American Classics / Breeders' Cup wins: Kentucky Derby (1981); Preakness Stakes (1981); Breeders' Cup Juvenile Fillies (1985); Breeders' Cup Classic (1985)

Racing awards
- United States Champion Jockey by wins (1967); United States Champion Jockey by earnings (1969)

Honours
- George Woolf Memorial Jockey Award (1986); United States Racing Hall of Fame (1990)

Significant horses
- Bold Forbes, Shuvee, Alydar, Davona Dale, Spectacular Bid, Fort Marcy, Desert Vixen; Chris Evert, Pleasant Colony, Lady's Secret, The Very One
- Updated on March 19, 2007

Jorge Velásquez (born December 28, 1946) is a Panamanian retired thoroughbred horse racing jockey.

Jorge Velasquez's career in thoroughbred racing began in his native Panama but as a teenager moved to the United States. In 1967 he won more races than any other American jockey and in 1969 was tops in money-winning.

In 1978 he became nationally famous for being one of the jockeys involved in probably the greatest rivalry in racing history. He finished second aboard Alydar to Affirmed in all three of the 1978 American Triple Crown races, losing by a combined total of less than two lengths. Velasquez and Alydar later achieved a small measure of satisfaction when they beat Affirmed in the 1978 Travers Stakes (although the win came via the disqualification of Affirmed for interference entering the far turn). In 1981 he rode Pleasant Colony to victory in the Kentucky Derby and Preakness Stakes but missed winning the Triple Crown when they finished third to Summing in the Belmont Stakes.

Velasquez won the 1985 Breeders' Cup Juvenile Fillies and the Breeders' Cup Classic. In 1986, he was voted the George Woolf Memorial Jockey Award by his peers and in 1990 was inducted in the National Museum of Racing and Hall of Fame. He retired as a jockey in 1997 having won 6,795 races. He worked as an official in racing and eventually became an agent for other jockeys.
