= Ángel Cordero Jr. =

Puerto Rican jockey

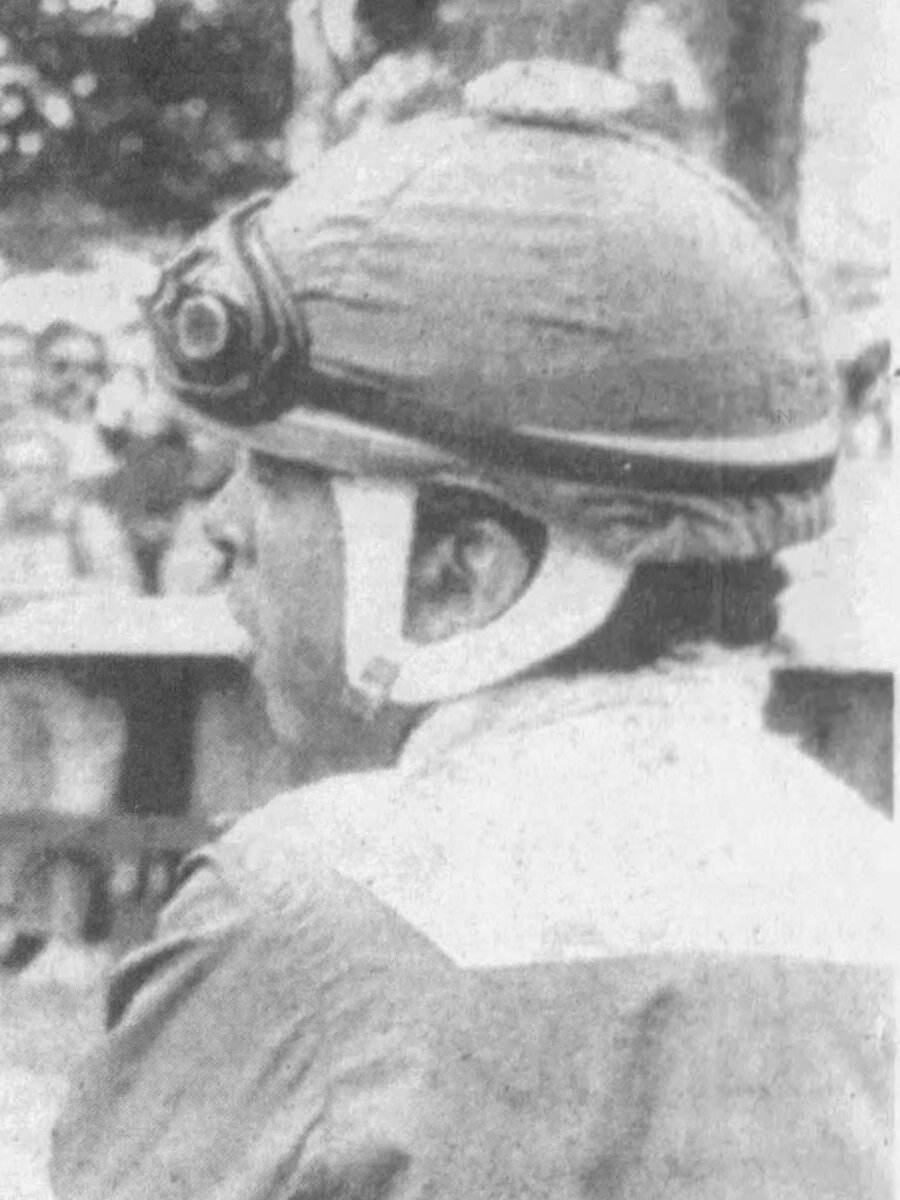
- Cordero, c. 1984

Personal information
- Born: November 8, 1942 (age 84) Santurce, Puerto Rico
- Occupation: Jockey / trainer

Horse racing career
- Sport: Horse racing
- Career wins: 7,057

Major racing wins
- Roamer Handicap (1968, 1974, 1981, 1984); Suburban Handicap (1969, 1970, 1974, 1987, 1989); Jockey Club Gold Cup (1972, 1983, 1984); Man o' War Stakes (1972, 1974, 1976, 1988); Matron Stakes (1974, 1980, 1983, 1987, 1989, 1991); Canadian International Stakes (1977); Kentucky Oaks (1984, 1989); Del Mar Futurity (1984); Arlington Million (1987); Washington, D.C. International (1988); Pimlico Special (1989) U.S. Triple Crown series: Kentucky Derby (1974, 1976, 1985); Preakness Stakes (1980, 1984); Belmont Stakes (1976); Breeders' Cup wins: Breeders' Cup Distaff (1985); Breeders' Cup Juvenile Fillies (1988); Breeders' Cup Sprint (1988, 1989) As a trainer: Lexington Stakes (1994)

Racing awards
- U.S. Champion Jockey by earnings (1976, 1982, 1983); U.S. Champion Jockey by wins (1968); Eclipse Award for Outstanding Jockey (1982, 1983, 1985); Big Sport of Turfdom Award (1992); Mike Venezia Memorial Award (1992)

Honors
- United States Racing Hall of Fame (1988); Nassau County Sports Hall of Fame (2001)

Significant horses
- Bold Forbes, Waya, Cum Laude Laurie, Seattle Slew, Relaxing, Jim French, Just A Game II, Slew o' Gold, Chief's Crown, Spend A Buck, Gulch, Groovy, Cannonade, Manila, Open Mind

Ángel Tomás Cordero Jr. (born November 8, 1942) is a Puerto Rican jockey. He is known for being one of the winningest Thoroughbred horse racing jockeys of the late 20th-century and the first Puerto Rican to be inducted into the United States' Racing Hall of Fame. He led all jockeys in wins at Saratoga Race Course for thirteen years. Cordero rode three Kentucky Derby winners and won 7,057 races in his career.

== Early years ==
Cordero was born in Santurce, Puerto Rico where he began racing at a young age. His father, Ángel Cordero Sr., was a rider and Thoroughbred trainer. His grandfather and uncles were also riders and horse trainers. His hometown in America is on Long Island, NY.

== American Classic Races ==
Cordero was the first Puerto Rican jockey to win all three of the American Classic Races, the Kentucky Derby, Preakness Stakes, and Belmont Stakes, though not all in the same year.

In 1974, when he was 31, Cordero won the Kentucky Derby aboard Cannonade. He won the Derby twice more, making him one of only eight jockeys to win the race three or more times in the Derby's history. In 1976, he won on Bold Forbes and in 1985, on Spend A Buck. In 1976, Cordero won the Belmont Stakes on Bold Forbes, and he won the Preakness Stakes twice, once in 1980 aboard Codex (his winning status was not overturned despite allegations of interfering with opponent-filly Genuine Risk) and the second time in 1984, aboard Gate Dancer.

Among his other accomplishments, Cordero was the winner of four Breeders' Cup races and was the leading rider at Saratoga Race Course for thirteen years. In 1987, Cordero became the fourth jockey to win over 6,000 races.

In 1992, Cordero's career was cut short after a fall which nearly cost him his life. His spleen was removed due to the accident that occurred at Aqueduct. However, against the wishes of his family and friends, in 1995, Cordero saddled up again to ride the Breeders' Cup once more.

== Later years ==
Cordero has now retired from riding, but continues to be involved in the sport full-time. He was the agent of fellow Puerto Rican horse jockey, John Velazquez. Cordero's wife, Marjorie Clayton Cordero, who was also a well-known figure in New York's thoroughbred racing, died on January 22, 2001. Cordero is the father of five children.

Cordero was inducted into National Museum of Racing and Hall of Fame in 1988 and in 2001, he was inducted into the Nassau County Sports Hall of Fame. In 2010 he was inducted into the African-American Ethnic Sports Hall of Fame.

In an interview in December 2021, Cordero spoke about his life-long friendship with Major League Baseball Hall of Famer Orlando Cepeda, who he considers his brother.

In 2021, Cordero was based in New York full-time and working with Manuel Franco, a Puerto Rican jockey.

== See also ==
- List of Puerto Ricans
