= 1973 Kentucky Derby =

Horse race

99th Kentucky Derby
- Kentucky Derby
- Grade I stakes race
- Location: Churchill Downs, Louisville, Kentucky
- Date: May 5, 1973; 5:40 PM EDT
- Winning horse: Secretariat
- Winning time: 1:59 2/5
- Jockey: Ron Turcotte
- Trainer: Lucien Laurin
- Owner: Penny Chenery
- Conditions: Fast
- Surface: Dirt
- Attendance: 134,476

The 1973 Kentucky Derby was the 99th running of the Kentucky Derby at Churchill Downs in Louisville, Kentucky. Secretariat won the Derby in a record time of 1:59 2/5, 2 1/2 lengths ahead of Sham, while Our Native finished in third position. Of the thirteen horses that entered and started the race, all horses completed the event. The event was viewed in person by a then-record crowd of 134,476, while also being broadcast both on television and over the radio.

In the days leading up to the race, Secretariat was seen as the favorite to win by many; however there were doubts about him following a third-place finish at the Wood Memorial Stakes two weeks prior to the Derby. In the wake of Secretariat's loss, Angle Light and, in particular, Sham were the horses that were seen as the most likely to win the Derby, aside from Secretariat. Many sportswriters believed that the horses in the field possessed great speed and thought the course record would be broken.

Shecky Greene took the lead first and led for the majority of the first seven furlongs. Sham took the lead from Shecky Greene near the three quarter mile mark. As the horses entered the homestretch, Secretariat passed Sham in the final furlong and distanced himself to consolidate his lead. Secretariat would go on to win the Preakness Stakes and Belmont Stakes in the succeeding weeks, also in record times, and became the ninth horse to complete the Triple Crown of Thoroughbred Racing.

== Pre-race coverage ==
Thirteen horses entered the Derby, which could have at most twenty participants. Horse owners had to pay a final entry fee of $2,500 to have their horses officially entered. The field was larger than anticipated because of new entries following Secretariat's loss at the Wood Memorial Stakes in New York.

The Wood Memorial had been the last prep race for three year-olds before the Kentucky Derby. It was a 1 1/8 mile contest held two weeks prior at Aqueduct Racetrack. Angle Light, whom groom Edward Sweat called a "very quiet horse," won the race by a length ahead of Sham, while Secretariat finished in third, four lengths behind. Secretariat's third-place finish led spectators and sportswriters to question his ability and health; but it was later thought that his performance in the Wood had been affected by a mouth abscess discovered prior to the race. It was his first defeat since he had finished fourth in his first race and had been relegated from first to second place because of an infraction during the Champagne Stakes, both of which occurred during his two-year-old campaign.

Secretariat was nonetheless the morning line favorite of the Derby entrants, despite losing the Wood. This was because he had been 1972 American Horse of the Year for a two-year-old campaign that featured seven victories in nine starts. Secretariat also won the two races he had entered prior to the Wood Memorial, the Gotham and Bay Shore Stakes. Sham's trainer, Frank "Pancho" Martin, stated that Secretariat was the horse to beat and the only way to "knock" the horse was to beat him.

Sham, who had won the Santa Anita Derby, was seen as the most formidable challenger to Secretariat in the Derby because of his finish ahead of Secretariat in the Wood and his Santa Anita victory. Coming off the heels of his victory at the Wood, Angle Light was seen as a threat to win. Angle Light was also trained by Lucien Laurin along with Secretariat, and thus Secretariat and Angle Light were coupled for betting purposes. Flamingo Stakes winner Our Native finished first or second in seven of his nine starts during the 1973 season, causing him to be named as a contender. Blue Grass Stakes winner My Gallant and Shecky Greene, who won the Fountain of Youth Stakes, were both trained in Chicago by Lou Goldline, which also resulted in their odds being coupled. Goldline said the two horses were similar and would do well at Churchill Downs because they both liked fast tracks. Impecunious, who was victorious in the Arkansas Derby, was initially entered in the race, but withdrew two days before because of a bruised heel. None of the competing horses had been sired by a previous Derby winner.

Florida Derby winner Royal and Regal had been suffering some problems with his feet going into the race and was seen as a horse that could potentially be scratched before the race began. Shecky Greene, Angle Light, and Royal and Regal were thought to be the only horses in the field that had "appreciable early speed" and would challenge to be the leader out of the gates. My Gallant was to be ridden by Angel Cordero, but Cordero was suspended for ten days starting the day of the Derby for a rules infraction on a race on May 2. Braulio Baeza was chosen to jockey My Gallant, after being dropped by the owners of Shecky Greene in advance of the race because they were unsure whether that horse would be entered into the Derby. Larry Adams was ultimately selected as the jockey for Shecky Greene. With the speed of the horses entered, many thought that the course record of 2:00 would be broken.

Chicago Tribune writer David Condon chose Shecky Greene to win the race because he felt the course was suited for him and because his great-grandfather was Bull Lea, who sired three Derby winners. Condon picked Warbucks as his second-place finisher because Warbucks' trainer, Don Combs, trained the 1970 Kentucky Derby winner Dust Commander and his jockey, Bill Hartack, was "long overdue" for a win and would have Warbucks near the front. Gerald Strine of The Washington Post believed Sham could win the race if he allowed Shecky Greene or Royal and Regal to lead the majority of the race and made a move towards the end. Strine picked Sham to win and My Gallant to finish second.

== Event details ==
Derby officials set the official post-time at 5:40 PM EDT. It was broadcast over television and radio through CBS and WCBS, respectively. Win Elliot served as the commentator for the pre-race coverage, while Ray Haight announced it for the third consecutive year. All horses competing carried weights of 126 pounds. The prize money for the race was set at $198,800. The first through fourth placed horses received $155,050, $25,000, $12,500, and $5,000, respectively. The weather during the Derby was clear and the course conditions were fast.

The official attendance of the event was 134,476, of which 70,000 were estimated to be in the infield of Churchill Downs. This surpassed the previous Derby record of 130,564; however the record lasted only a year as the 1974 edition attracted 163,628 spectators. Dwight Chapin of Los Angeles Times and author Timothy Capps credited the increased attendance due to Secretariat's loss at the Wood.

== Race summary ==
Twice a Prince reared in the starting gate, which delayed the start. Out of the starting gate, Shecky Greene set the pace for the field, while race favorite Secretariat started in last place. Exiting the gate, Sham hit his mouth against the gate and subsequently bumped into Navajo before gaining proper stride. Sham briefly took the lead around the quarter-mile marker, but Shecky Greene quickly retook the lead. Beginning the first turn, Secretariat had moved ahead of only two horses; however, in the next quarter-mile Secretariat moved into sixth position. A half-mile in, Shecky Greene maintained a three length lead over Gold Bag, but his pace had slowed compared to the first quarter. Sham remained close to the front of the field within the top four for the first half of the race; he moved into second position as the field reached the half-mile post. At the three-quarters post, at the start of the homestretch, Shecky Greene began to fade and Sham overtook him to move into first going into the final furlong. Secretariat, who had passed his competitors on the outside throughout the race, overtook Sham in the final furlong and pulled ahead, finishing 2 1/2 horse lengths in front of Sham. Our Native took third and Forego, who went on to win multiple Eclipse Awards as an older horse, was fourth.

Secretariat's winning time of 1:59 2/5 and last quarter mile in 23 seconds were both records for the Derby. (Note: The old record for the Derby was 2:00, set by Northern Dancer in 1964. The previous fastest timed quarter mile record was 23 3/5 seconds by Whirlaway in 1941.) In addition, he had run each quarter-mile faster than before, with times of 25 1/5, 24, 23 4/5, 23 2/5, and 23 seconds. Furthermore, Secretariat became the first horse in Derby history to run the race in under 2 minutes at the 1 1/4 mile distance. Sham maintained his stride and crossed the line in second place, eight lengths ahead of third-place finisher Our Native, who had lost ground on the final turn into the homestretch. Sham also broke the previous course record with a time of 1:59 4/5. Shecky Greene, who led for most of the race, finished in sixth position.

== Result ==
Final placings (1–13)
Finish	PP	Pgm	Horse	Jockey	Trainer	Owner	Final Odds (Note: The odds are all to $1; for example, Secretariat's odds of winning were $1.50 on a $1.00 wager.)	Stake (Note: The total purse for the race was $198,800.)
1	10	1A	Secretariat	Ron Turcotte	Lucien Laurin	Penny Chenery	1.50	$155,050
2	4	5	Sham	Laffit Pincay, Jr.	Frank "Pancho" Martin	Sigmund Sommer	2.50	$25,000
3	7	8	Our Native	Donald Brumfield	William J. Resseguet Jr.	E. Pritchard, E.W. Thomas, Resseguet, Jr.	10.60	$12,500
4	9	10	Forego	Pete Anderson	Sherrill W. Ward	Lazy F Ranch	28.60	$5,000
5	1	3	Restless Jet	Michael Hole	Carter Thorton	Elkwood Farm	28.50	–
6	11	2	Shecky Greene	Larry Adams	Louis M. Goldfine	Joseph Kellman	5.70	–
7	5	6	Navajo	Weston Soirez	James O. Keefer	A.J. Stevenson, Ray Stump	52.30	–
8	8	9	Royal and Regal	Walter Blum	Warren A. "Jimmy" Croll Jr.	Aisco Stable	28.30	–
9	12	2C	My Gallant	Braulio Baeza	Louis M. Goldfine	Arthur I. Appleton	5.70	–
10	2	1	Angle Light	John B. LeBlanc	Lucien Laurin	Edwin Whittaker	1.50	–
11	13	11	Gold Bag	Earlie Fires	Randy Sechrest	Milton Gottdank, Sechrest	68.30	–
12	6	7	Twice a Prince	Angel Santiago	John P. Campo	Elmendorf Farm	62.50	–
13	3	4	Warbucks	Bill Hartack	Don Combs	E.E. Elzemeyer	7.20	–

=== Payout schedule ===
Kentucky Derby Payout Schedule
Pgm	Horse	Win	Place	Show
1A	Secretariat	$5.00	$3.20	$3.00
5	Sham	–	$3.20	$3.00
8	Our Native	–	–	$4.20

- $3 Exacta: (1A–5) $21.60
- $3 Quinella: (1A–5, 5–1A) $17.70

== Analysis ==
Secretariat at the Derby

The win in the Kentucky Derby marked Secretariat's third win in the four races he had run as a three-year-old. After the race, jockey Ron Turcotte stated, in response to Secretariat's last place start, he "just dropped my hand on him and let him run his own race." With Secretariat's victory, trainer Lucien Laurin had his second consecutive win in the Derby, as Riva Ridge won in 1972. Turcotte accomplished a similar feat as he had ridden Riva Ridge, marking the third time a jockey had won in the Derby in consecutive years.

When Secretariat pulled alongside Sham, Sham's jockey, Laffit Pincay Jr., felt Sham had a lot left, "but that other horse was just too much." Pincay stated that in future races, he planned to "wait a little longer before making my move." Donald Brumfield, Our Native's jockey said Twice a Prince kicked Our Native in the hoof and body while rearing in the starting gate. This forced Brumfield to dismount and adjust the saddle, delaying the Derby's start. Despite this, Brumfield stated he did not "want to make excuses, everything considered, my horse did fine."

Betting on the ten races held that day at Churchill Downs totaled to $7,627,965, breaking the previous single-day record for American horse racing events of $7,164,717. Off-track betting on the Kentucky Derby reached $3,050,194, which was included in the previous record total.

Secretariat went on to participate in the Preakness Stakes two weeks later, where he finished in first. Sham was second, again, by a margin of 2 1/2 lengths. Three weeks after the Preakness, the Belmont Stakes featured a five-horse field. Secretariat won by 31 lengths with a time of 2:24 for the mile and a half, both course records in their own right. Through his combined victories at the Belmont Stakes, Preakness Stakes, and Kentucky Derby, Secretariat became the ninth horse to complete the Triple Crown of Thoroughbred Racing, and the first horse since Citation in 1948, ending a 25-year period without a Triple Crown winner. Secretariat's times in all three Triple Crown races were course records and still stand to this day.
