= Secretariat (film) =

2010 sports drama film produced by Walt Disney Pictures

- Theatrical release poster
- Directed by: Randall Wallace
- Written by: Mike Rich; Sheldon Turner
- Produced by: Mark Ciardi; Gordon Gray
- Starring: Diane Lane; John Malkovich; Dylan Walsh; James Cromwell; Kevin Connolly; Scott Glenn
- Cinematography: Dean Semler
- Edited by: John Wright
- Music by: Nick Glennie-Smith
- Production companies: Walt Disney Pictures; Mayhem Pictures
- Distributed by: Walt Disney Studios; Motion Pictures
- Release dates: September 30, 2010 (Hollywood); October 8, 2010 (United States)
- Running time: 123 minutes
- Country: United States
- Language: English
- Budget: $35 million
- Box office: $60.3 million

Secretariat is a 2010 American biographical sports drama film produced and released by Walt Disney Pictures, written by Mike Rich and Sheldon Turner based largely on William Nack's 1975 book Secretariat: The Making of a Champion, with music by Nick Glennie-Smith and directed by Randall Wallace. The film chronicles the life of Thoroughbred race horse Secretariat, winner of the Triple Crown in 1973. Diane Lane plays Secretariat's owner, Penny Chenery, who takes over the Doswell, Virginia, stables of her ailing father Christopher Chenery despite her lack of horse-racing knowledge. With the help of veteran trainer Lucien Laurin (played by John Malkovich), she navigates the male-dominated business, ultimately fostering the first Triple Crown winner in 25 years, widely considered the greatest racehorse of all time.

Filming took place from September to November 2009 on location in Louisville and Lexington, Kentucky, and around Lafayette and Carencro, Louisiana. The film premiered in Hollywood on September 30, 2010, and was released in the United States on October 8, 2010, by Walt Disney Studios Motion Pictures. It received mixed to positive reviews from critics and earned $60 million on a $35 million budget.

== Plot ==
In 1969, Denver housewife and mother Penny Chenery learns of her own mother's death and returns to her childhood home, where she reunites with Mrs. Ham, her father's secretary, and comforts her confused and elderly father. At her mother's funeral, Penny meets Arthur "Bull" Hancock and his son, Seth Hancock, of Claiborne Farm in Kentucky. The Hancocks offer any help she may need during her efforts to bring Meadow Stables back to profitability. Penny's brother Hollis informs her of a dishonest sale that was about to be made by the trainer until their mother stopped him. Penny fires the trainer and asks Bull Hancock to help her find a new trainer. He recommends Lucien Laurin, an aging French Canadian, who initially turns down Penny's offer.

Penny's father make a deal with leading owner Ogden Phipps that if Phipps bred his best stallion (Bold Ruler) to Chenery's two best mares (Somethingroyal and Hasty Matelda), the two owners would each receive one foal, flipping a coin to decide who would choose. Bold Ruler, the stallion, was fast but couldn't last over distances. Hasty Matelda is the obvious choice for her young age, but Somethingroyal's bloodline is made up of many horses with good stamina. Penny hopes to choose Somethingroyal's foal for the interesting mix of speed and stamina. Phipps wins the toss and chooses Hasty Matelda's foal, leaving Penny with Somethingroyal's foal, Secretariat.

When Secretariat enters his first race at Aqueduct race track in Queens, New York City, everyone has high expectations. The jockey, Paul Feliciano, is young with little experience, which worries Penny, but Lucien reassures her. During the race, Secretariat is repeatedly hit by other horses and comes in fourth. Penny and Lucien argue, and Lucien blames Paul for the loss, but Penny realizes the only way that Secretariat will ever win is if he has an experienced jockey. Penny's flight back home is canceled on the day of the race, and she misses her daughter Kate's solo in a play, but her son holds up the pay phone so Penny can hear Kate sing.

Penny gets experienced Canadian jockey Ron Turcotte to ride Secretariat to many victories. Secretariat is named horse of the year after a successful two-year-old season. Penny's father suffers a stroke and dies, leaving Penny and her brother Hollis to inherit the estate. Although she needs six million dollars to pay estate taxes, Penny refuses to sell Secretariat and instead syndicates him, selling 32 shares worth more than six million dollars, as long as he can win a three-year-old distance race. She tries to sell a share to Ogden Phipps, who instead offers to buy the horse for seven million dollars. Penny refuses to sell him. When Phipps demands to know why, she tells him Secretariat's value will triple when he wins the Triple Crown – a feat no horse has accomplished in twenty-five years. During this time, Frank "Pancho" Martin, trainer of rival horse Sham, tries to provoke a match race with Secretariat.

Secretariat is taken to the Wood Memorial three weeks before the first of the Triple Crown races to take on Sham and attempt to earn Penny her syndication money. Turcotte notices that the horse's breathing is heavy, he refuses to eat, and he is reluctant to allow the bit into his mouth. After Secretariat loses the race, an abscess in his mouth is discovered which may have caused the underperformance.

Secretariat recovers and wins both the Kentucky Derby and the Preakness in record time. Sham comes in second place in both races and Pancho tells Sham's jockey, Laffit Pincay, to stay with Secretariat through the Belmont in an attempt to tire him early and win. However, Secretariat runs an unbelievable race, finishing 31 lengths (over 82 yards (75 m)) ahead of the next horse to secure the Triple Crown, with Sham in last place. Penny and her family then receive the Triple Crown trophy at the end of the race and celebrate.

== Cast ==
- Diane Lane as Penny Chenery
- John Malkovich as Lucien Laurin
- Dylan Walsh as John "Jack" Tweedy
- James Cromwell as Ogden Phipps
- Kevin Connolly as Bill Nack
- Nelsan Ellis as Eddie Sweat
- Dylan Baker as Hollis B. Chenery
- Margo Martindale as Elizabeth Ham
- Scott Glenn as Christopher Chenery
- Amanda Michalka as Kate Tweedy
- Drew Roy as Seth Hancock
- Graham McTavish as Earl Jansen
- Fred Dalton Thompson as Bull Hancock
- Eric Lange as Andy Beyer
- Nestor Serrano as Pancho Martin
- Otto Thorwarth as Ron Turcotte
- Carissa Capobianco as Sarah Tweedy
- Stephen Stanton as Chic Anderson (Triple Crown race announcer)
- Penny Chenery made a cameo appearance during the final race

== Production ==
William Nack, who wrote the film's source book Secretariat: The Making of a Champion (1975), was also a consultant for the film and made a cameo appearance. Part of the film was shot on location in both Louisville and Lexington, Kentucky for three weeks then moved to Louisiana to reproduce the Triple Crown infields at Evangeline Downs, located in Opelousas, Louisiana. Several horses were used to depict Secretariat in the film, chief among them Trolley Boy, whose great-great-grandsire was the real-life Secretariat, and Longshot Max, whose bloodline includes Secretariat's sire, Bold Ruler, as well as his grandsire, Princequillo.

== Reception ==
=== Critical response ===
As of January 2026, the film holds a 64% approval rating on review aggregation website Rotten Tomatoes, based on 156 reviews with an average rating of 6.11/10. The website's critical consensus reads: "Rousing, heartwarming, and squarely traditional, Secretariat offers exactly what you'd expect from an inspirational Disney drama – no more, no less". On Metacritic, it has a weighted average score of 61 out of 100, based on 36 critics, indicating "generally favorable reviews". Audiences polled by CinemaScore gave the film an average grade of "A" on an A+ to F scale.

Chicago Sun-Times film critic Roger Ebert gave the film four out of four stars saying that "...this whole movie feels authentic". Hannah Goodwyn of Christian Broadcasting Network gave Secretariat a "Jumbo Popcorn" rating, saying: "Though many may consider Seabiscuit as the preeminent horse-racing film, Secretariat beats it by lengths".

=== Controversy ===
Film critic Andrew O'Hehir of Salon created some controversy with his review of the film, writing that, although he "enjoyed the film immensely", that didn't "stop [him] from believing that in its totality Secretariat is a work of creepy, half-hilarious master-race propaganda almost worthy of Leni Riefenstahl, and all the more effective because it presents as a family-friendly yarn about a nice lady and her horse". He cited what he felt was the possible xenophobic undercurrent to the film, as well as its 'unpleasant' and 'stereotypical' presentation of non-white characters as justification for his theory. In response, fellow critic Roger Ebert posted that O'Hehir's review of Secretariat was "so bizarre I cannot allow it to pass unnoticed. I don't find anywhere in Secretariat the ideology he discovers there". Bill Nack, the author of the book the film is based on, pointed out that Pancho Martin's verbal attack on Laurin before the Kentucky Derby was not intended to create an image of Martin as 'evil' or 'vaguely terrorist-flavored', as O'Hehir claimed in his review. The film lifted Martin's diatribes against Laurin from Nack's book, which were a transcription of Martin's actual words as recorded by Nack. Nack wondered who O'Hehir could claim as a source to say that Martin wasn't boastful. Ron Turcotte, who rode Secretariat to victory, said about Martin's portrayal in the film: "It wasn't that way". Conservative media personality Rush Limbaugh also took issue with O'Hehir's review. In response to Ebert, O'Hehir wrote that he was being hyperbolic: "My hyperbole in the Secretariat review was supposed to be funny, and also to provoke a response".

=== Historical inaccuracies ===
Bill Christine, a former long-time racing writer for the Los Angeles Times, pointed out that the film made some significant departures from Secretariat's actual history. These include:

- The film makes no mention of Riva Ridge, a Chenery-owned horse that had won the 1972 Kentucky Derby and Belmont, and helped keep Meadow Stable afloat. According to Christine, but for Riva Ridge's career, Chenery might not have even owned Secretariat by the time he turned three.
- Christine called the portrayal of several people, including Pancho Martin and Ogden Phipps, "cartoonish".
- The film leads viewers to believe that Sham won the Wood Memorial, a major prep race then held two weeks before the Derby. In reality, that race was won by Angle Light. Chenery's most significant conflict in the run-up to the Derby was not with Phipps, but instead with Edwin Whittaker, the owner of Angle Light (a horse also trained by Laurin).

Steve Haskin, a sportswriter for The Blood-Horse, had some of the same issues, particularly the omission of Riva Ridge and the staging of the Wood Memorial. He also added: "Although the horses who played Secretariat did not capture the majesty and physical presence of Big Red, the equine stars did well enough, considering there isn't a horse alive who could have done justice to him."

=== Box office ===
The film opened in third place at the box office in its opening weekend, grossing $4 million on opening day and $12,694,770 over the three-day weekend, just falling behind The Social Network and Life as We Know It. The film had an average of $4,132 from 3,072 locations. In its second weekend, the film held extremely well with only a 27% slide to $9.3 million and finishing fourth for a $3,032 average from 3,072 theaters. It then held up even better in its third weekend, slipping only 25% to just over $7 million and finishing sixth for a $2,254 average from 3,108 theaters. The film was a relative box office success, grossing $60 million by the end of its run. In the United Kingdom, the film was released on December 4, 2010, with no promotion and was withdrawn from most UK cinemas after just one week.

== Home media ==
Secretariat was released by Walt Disney Studios Home Entertainment on DVD, as well as a 2-disc Blu-ray & DVD combo pack on January 30, 2011. Bonus features on the DVD included deleted scenes and a director introduction. The Blu-ray bonuses included a look at how the racing scenes were filmed, an interview with Penny Chenery, and a profile of Secretariat's 1973 Belmont race.

== Accolades ==
Award	Category	Nominee	Result
Christopher Award	Feature Film	Randall Wallace, Mark Ciardi, Gordon Gray, Bill Johnson, Mike Rich	Won
ESPY Award	Best Sports Movie		Nominated
MovieGuide Awards	Best Film for Mature Audiences	Mark Ciardi (Producer), Gordon Gray (Producer), Randall Wallace (Director), Bill Johnson (Executive Producer)	Won
Phoenix Film Critics Society Awards	Best Live Action Family Film		Nominated
Satellite Award	Best Youth DVD		Nominated
Satellite Award	Best Cinematography and Best Sound (Mixing & Editing)	Kami Asgar, Sean McCormack, David O. Daniel, Kevin O'Connell, Beau Borders and Dean Semler	Nominated
Women's Image Network Awards	Actress Feature Film	Diane Lane	Nominated

== Soundtrack ==
- "Silent Night" – Performed by AJ Michalka
- "I'll Take You There" – Performed by The Staple Singers
- "Oh Happy Day" – Performed by The Edwin Hawkins Singers
- "The Longest Goodbye" – Written and performed by Scott Nickoley and Jamie Dunlap
- "I Am Free" – Produced and performed by Nick Glennie-Smith
- "My Old Kentucky Home" – Written by Stephen Foster, performed by The University of Kentucky Wildcat Marching Band
- "It's Not How Fast, It's Not How Far" – Performed by Andrew Wallace
- "It's Who You Are" – Written and performed by Randall Wallace and AJ Michalka
- "My Old Kentucky Home" – Performed by Tricia Aguirre

== See also ==
- List of films about horses
- List of films about horse racing
- Secretariat (horse)
- Triple Crown

== Bibliography ==
- Christine, Bill (October 3, 2010). "'Secretariat's' Loss: rival Angle Light". Los Angeles Times. p. 24.
