= 1973 Belmont Stakes =

American horse race

105th Belmont Stakes
- Belmont Stakes
- Grade I stakes race
- Location: Belmont Park; Elmont, New York, U.S.
- Date: June 9, 1973
- Distance: 1 1/2 mi (12 furlongs; 2,414 m)
- Winning horse: Secretariat
- Winning time: 2:24
- Jockey: Ron Turcotte
- Trainer: Lucien Laurin
- Owner: Penny Chenery
- Conditions: Fast
- Surface: Dirt
- Attendance: 69,138

The 1973 Belmont Stakes was the 105th running of the Belmont Stakes at Belmont Park in Elmont, New York, held on June 9, 1973. Facing a field of five horses, Secretariat won by 31 lengths going away, the largest margin of victory in Belmont history, in front of a crowd of 69,138 spectators. His winning time of 2 minutes and 24 seconds still stands as the American record for a mile and a half on dirt. The event was televised and broadcast over the radio.

Secretariat was widely viewed as the favorite to win by most sportswriters and people; however, the added distance and the possibility of running too slow for a distance or running too fast too soon could potentially cause him to lose. Out of the starting gate, Secretariat and Sham traded the lead. Around the three-quarters mile marker Sham began to fade and Secretariat began to extend an advantage. Twice a Prince and My Gallant overtook Sham to take second and third, respectively. Sham finished last, behind Pvt. Smiles, who was in last before Sham slowed severely.

The victory in the Belmont, when combined with Secretariat's previous victories in the Kentucky Derby and the Preakness Stakes, meant he completed the Triple Crown of Thoroughbred Racing. Secretariat became the ninth horse to complete the feat and broke a 25-year drought where no horse had won the Triple Crown.

== Pre-race coverage ==
Secretariat, Sham, Pvt. Smiles, and My Gallant were the first four horses to be entered into the Belmont Stakes. Secretariat, winner of both the Kentucky Derby and the Preakness Stakes, was the odds on favorite to win the event. The added distance of the Belmont when compared to the Derby and Preakness was found to be one potential reason for Secretariat to lose the race. Steve Cady of The New York Times wrote that Secretariat could be defeated if the pace of the race went too fast or was too slow for too long, in both of which scenarios he felt Sham would win. Sham received significant attention as well and was thought to be the second best horse, along with having the potential of becoming the first horse to be runner-up in all the Triple Crown races. My Gallant was considered the best of the rest, especially as he was the progeny of Gallant Man, who set the Belmont Stakes course record of 2:26 3/5 in the 1957 edition.

Knightly Dawn was entered into the race on June 6 and was thought to bring early speed to the race and alter the way it would be run. Before Knightly Dawn's entry, Secretariat was speculated to lead from the race's start. With the presence of Knightly Dawn, William Boniface of The Baltimore Sun believed that Secretariat would have to run faster earlier on, thus making the final half-mile more unpredictable. Pancho Martin, the trainer of Knightly Dawn, said he would only run the horse if it rained as Knightly Dawn's only previous success had been in the Jersey Derby on a sloppy track. However, Knightly Dawn was scratched prior to race day. The horse's scratch also reduced the winner's share from $150,200 to $90,120.

There was much speculation going into the Stakes over Secretariat's bid for the Triple Crown. Since 1948, when Citation achieved the feat, there had been six horses that had won both the Kentucky Derby and the Preakness Stakes before failing in the Belmont Stakes. When comparing Secretariat to those six horses' health and fitness before the Belmont Stakes, writer Boniface felt Secretariat was in the best shape, almost as good as when he entered the Kentucky Derby weeks prior. Just days before the Belmont, Secretariat ran five furlongs in just under a minute in a morning workout. Following that, Secretariat's jockey Ron Turcotte told reporters that Secretariat was ready for a top charge on Saturday.

== Event details ==
Post time for the race was 5:38 PM EDT. It was televised by CBS and aired on CBS Radio. All jockeys competing were 126 pounds (57 kg). The weather during the race was clear, and the course conditions were fast. The scratch of Knightly Dawn before the race reduced the purse to $150,200, which was awarded to the first through fourth-place finishers in the sums of $90,120, $33,044, $18,024, and $9,012, respectively.

Attendance figures were speculated to be around 70,000 leading up to the race, which was accurate as the official attendance for the event was reported to be 69,138. This became the second-most attended Belmont Stakes at the time, after the 1971 race that had 82,694 in attendance.

== Race summary ==
Secretariat in the stretch run

Out of the starting gate, Secretariat and Sham raced evenly through the first turn. Through a half-mile, the two were even. Entering the backstretch and approaching three-quarters of a mile, Secretariat began to distance himself as Sham began to fade, ultimately finishing last. Approximately 11 days after the Belmont Stakes, Sham suffered a hairline fracture in his right front cannon bone during training, which ended his racing career.

Secretariat continued to extend his advantage for the rest of the race, finishing 31 lengths over the second-place finisher, Twice a Prince. Twice a Prince started slowly and moved along the rail until reaching second position, passing Sham and outpacing My Gallant. Track announcer Chic Anderson described Secretariat's move from the backstretch with the famous call, "Secretariat is widening now. He is moving like a tremendous machine!"

Secretariat set the Belmont Stakes track record at 2:24 and the record for largest margin of victory. (Note: The previous course record was 2:26 3/5, set by Gallant Man in 1957. The largest margin of victory at the Belmont Stakes before the 1973 race was set in 1943, when Count Fleet won by 25 lengths. Secretariat's 2:24 to cover 1.5 miles equates to an average speed of 37.5 miles per hour (60.4 km/h).) Secretariat also broke the American record for a mile-and-a-half on a dirt track, breaking the previous record of 2:26 1/5, set by Going Abroad in 1964.

== Results ==
Final results
Finish	PP	Pgm	Horse	Jockey	Trainer	Owner	Margin	Final Odds (Note: The odds are all to $1; for example, Secretariat's odds of winning were $0.10 on a $1.00 wager.)	Stake (Note: The total purse for the race was $150,200.)
1	1	2	Secretariat	Ron Turcotte	Lucien Laurin	Meadow Stable	31	$0.10	$90,120
2	4	5	Twice a Prince	Braulio Baeza	John P. Campo	Elmendorf Farm	1/2	$17.30	$33,044
3	3	4	My Gallant	Ángel Cordero Jr.	Louis M. Goldfine	Arthur I. Appleton	13	$12.40	$18,024
4	2	3	Pvt. Smiles	Dan Gargan	George T. Poole	Cornelius Vanderbilt Whitney	3/4	$14.30	$9,012
5	5	1A	Sham	Laffit Pincay, Jr.	Frank "Pancho" Martin	Sigmund Sommer	–	$5.10	$0
Scratched	4	1	Knightly Dawn	Ismael Valenzuela	Frank "Pancho" Martin	Sigmund Sommer			

Times
Distance	Fractional	Split
1/4 mile	0:23 3/5	—
1/2 mile	0:46 1/5	:22 3/5
3/4 mile	1:09 4/5	:23 3/5
1 mile	1:34 1/5	:24 2/5
1 1/4 mile	1:59	:24 4/5
Finish	2:24	:25

=== Payout schedule ===
Belmont Stakes Payout Schedule
Pgm	Horse	Win	Place	Show (Note: As there were only five competing horses, there was no show awarded for the Stakes. This was the fifth instance where no bets for Show were taken for the Belmont Stakes.)
2	Secretariat	$2.60	$2.20	–
5	Twice a Prince	–	$2.20	–

- $3 Exacta: (2–5) $35.20

== Analysis ==
Neil Milbert of the Chicago Tribune wrote that Secretariat "ran what may have been the greatest horse race in history." When asked about Secretariat's margin of victory, trainer Lucien Laurin stated: "Naturally, not that big!" He further commented on Sham's performance saying, "The horse we had to kill, we did." My Gallant's jockey Ángel Cordero Jr. said Secretariat was "just like a car." Secretariat's jockey Ron Turcotte told the press that he saw the timer on the track hit 2:20 and he told himself "Oh I can make it" and continued to press Secretariat forward to break the course record. The UPI wrote that Secretariat's performance in the race put him in the ranks of the greatest race horses of all time.

That day at Belmont Park, $7.9 million was wagered on the nine races that were held during the day, which includes $2.2 million from off-track betting. A total of $5.6 million was bet through the mutuels that day. The Stakes itself had $519,689 bet on it. Bettors holding 5,617 winning parimutuel tickets on Secretariat never redeemed them, presumably keeping them as souvenirs.

== Aftermath ==
Racing colors of Meadow Stable

Through his combined victories at the Belmont Stakes, Preakness Stakes, and Kentucky Derby, Secretariat became the ninth horse to complete the Triple Crown of Thoroughbred Racing, and the first horse since Citation in 1948, ending a 25-year period without a Triple Crown winner. Secretariat's times in all three Triple Crown races were course records and still stand.

Following the Belmont, Secretariat was allowed several weeks rest before entering a few more competitions and then starting his a career as a stud, where he had been syndicated for close to $6.08 million.

In part due to accomplishing the Triple Crown and winning other races during the 1973 calendar season, Secretariat won Horse of the Year for the second consecutive year. In addition, he also won Eclipse Awards as the American Champion Three-Year-Old Male Horse and the American Champion Male Turf Horse. He was inducted to the Thoroughbred Horse Racing Hall of Fame in 1974.

In 2013, the 40th anniversary of his Belmont win was commemorated by the New York Racing Association by placing a blue-and-white checkered pole (the colors of Meadow Stable) at the Belmont track, located 253 feet 2 inches (77.17 m) from the finish line to mark the 31-length margin of victory.
