= Eddie Sweat =

American racehorse groom (1939–1998)

Edward/Eddie Sweat
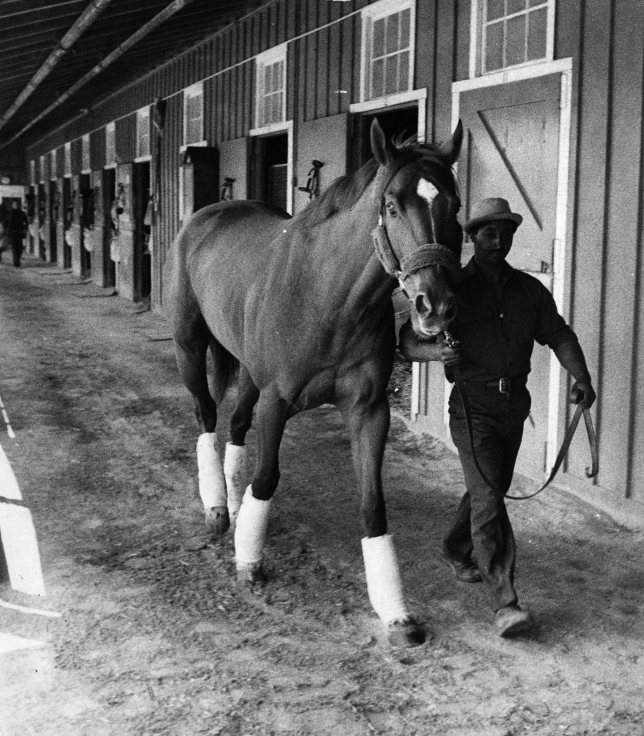
- Sweat and Secretariat preparing for the 1973 Preakness Stakes

Personal information
- Born: August 29, 1939 Holly Hill, South Carolina, United States
- Died: April 17, 1998 (aged 58)
- Resting place: Rock Hill A.M.E. Church Cemetery, Orangeburg County, South Carolina
- Occupation: Groom

Horse racing career
- Sport: Horse racing
- Career wins: N/A

Major racing wins
- Kentucky Derby (1972, 1973); Preakness Stakes (1973); Belmont Stakes (1966, 1973); Breeders' Cup Juvenile (1984)

Honours
- Life-sized statue at Kentucky Horse Park

Significant horses
- Quill, Amberoid, Riva Ridge, Angle Light; Secretariat, Chief's Crown

Edward Sweat (August 29, 1939 – April 17, 1998) was an American groom in Thoroughbred horse racing noted for involvement with Secretariat. He was the subject of a 2006 book by Lawrence Scanlan titled The Horse God Built: Secretariat, His Groom, Their Legacy.

== Career ==
Born in Holly Hill, South Carolina, Eddie Sweat was one of nine children of a sharecropper. Holly Hill was where future U.S. Racing Hall of Fame trainer Lucien Laurin maintained a Thoroughbred horse farm. Laurin offered Sweat a job after he saw the wide-eyed teen frequently peeking at the horses through a fence to the property. In 1957, at age eighteen, Sweat accepted the offer of full-time work as groom for the Laurin stable of racehorses with a small fixed salary plus 1% of the horse's earnings.

One of the first highly successful horses placed in Sweat's care was the 1958 American Champion Two-Year-Old Filly Quill. In 1966, Sweat was part of the Laurin stables' first American Classic win when Amberoid captured the Belmont Stakes. Six years later, Sweat gained national media attention for his abilities in handling Thoroughbreds when sportswriter William Nack spent many hours with him during 1972 and 1973 outside the Laurin stable stalls of Kentucky Derby winner Riva Ridge and Secretariat. In a Sports Illustrated feature article, Nack said he took notes compulsively, endlessly, feeling for the texture of the life around the horse. Secretariat was voted the 1972 American Horse of the Year, an extraordinary feat for a two-year-old, and leading up to and through the horse's winning of the 1973 Triple Crown, all of the key people involved with Secretariat received massive national and international attention. Interviewed and photographed countless times, Sweat appeared on television and was on the covers of both Ebony and Jet magazines. Eddie was also the first groom to ever have groomed Kentucky Derby winners two years in a row, Riva Ridge in 1972 and Secretariat in 1973.

Following Lucien Laurin's retirement, Sweat worked for his son, Roger Laurin, and in 1984 once again received considerable national media attention with Chief's Crown. The colt won the Breeders' Cup Juvenile, was voted the Eclipse Award as American Champion Two-Year-Old Colt, and was the betting favorite for all three of the 1985 Triple Crown races.

== Death ==
Sweat made his home in St. Albans, Queens, New York, a short drive from the Belmont Park racetrack. After 41 years in the business, he died of leukemia in 1998.

== Legacy ==
Widely recognized for his talent, dedication, and important contributions to Secretariat's racing career, Sweat was the subject of a 2006 book by Lawrence Scanlan, titled The Horse God Built: Secretariat, His Groom, Their Legacy. There is a life-size statue at the Kentucky Horse Park of Eddie Sweat leading Secretariat and jockey Ron Turcotte to the winner's circle after winning the 1973 Kentucky Derby.

== Popular culture ==
In the 2010 film Secretariat, Eddie Sweat was portrayed by actor Nelsan Ellis.
