= 1973 Preakness Stakes =

98th running of the Preakness Stakes

98th Preakness Stakes
- Preakness Stakes
- Grade I stakes race
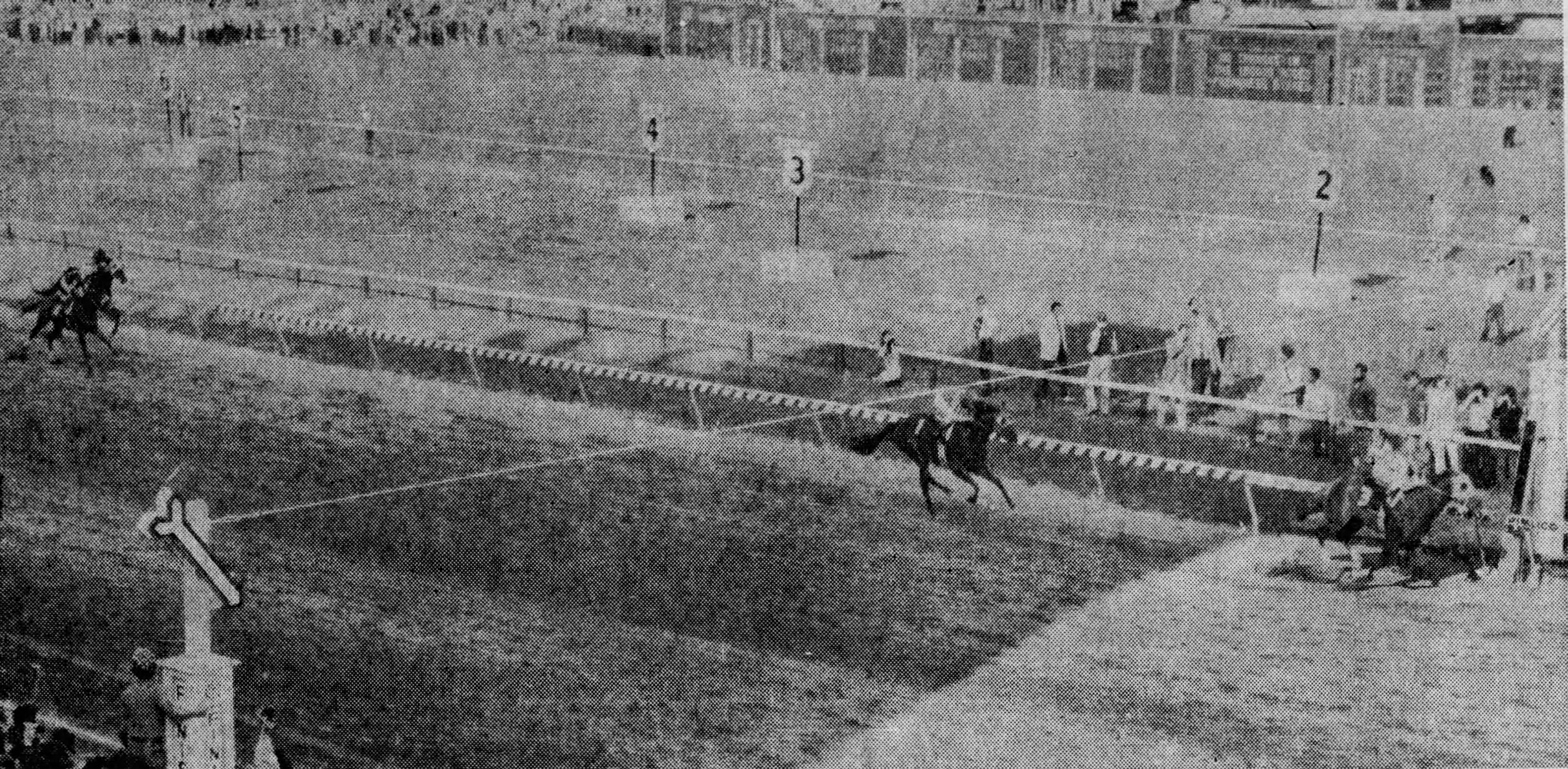
- Secretariat crossing the finish line
- Location: Pimlico Race Course, Baltimore, Maryland, US
- Date: May 19, 1973; 5:40 PM EDT
- Winning horse: Secretariat
- Winning time: 1:53
- Jockey: Ron Turcotte
- Trainer: Lucien Laurin
- Owner: Penny Chenery
- Conditions: Fast
- Surface: Dirt
- Attendance: 61,657

The 1973 Preakness Stakes was the 98th running of the Preakness Stakes at Pimlico Race Course in Baltimore, Maryland, United States, held on May 19, 1973. Six horses entered, and Secretariat won by 2 1/2 lengths ahead of Sham in front of a record crowd of 61,657 spectators. The race was viewed on television and broadcast over the radio.

In the period leading up to the Preakness, Kentucky Derby winner Secretariat was pegged as the favorite to win the race. Aside from Secretariat, Sham was named as the only other horse that could win the race or even challenge Secretariat. Initially seven horses officially enrolled to race in the event, but the field reduced to six after an owner scratched his horse. The entrants in the Preakness featured three horses that did not compete in the Derby. At the start, Secretariat broke last, but then made a huge, last-to-first move on the first turn. After reaching the lead with 5 1/2 furlongs to go, he was never challenged, and won by 2 1/2 lengths, Sham finishing second and Our Native third. The victory led to the stallion being featured on several magazine covers. Secretariat would go on to win the Belmont Stakes in the succeeding weeks, becoming the ninth horse to complete the Triple Crown of Thoroughbred Racing and the first in 25 years.

The timing of the race was questioned, as the official clock malfunctioned and the official timer recorded a result slower than that recorded by clockers for the Daily Racing Form, who maintained that Secretariat had set a record. The dispute was not resolved until 2012, when newer technology allowed for a forensic review of the videotapes and an accurate calculation of the actual time, which was formally recorded as 1:53, a record time for the race still standing as of 2026.

== Pre-race activity ==
Between the Kentucky Derby and the Preakness, Mr. Prospector, Cup Bearer, Ecole Etage, Champagne Charlie, and Step Nicely, none of whom had run in the Derby, were all named as possible entrants. Three horses, Secretariat, Sham, and Our Native, all raced in the Kentucky Derby two weeks prior. On May 15, seven owners confirmed their intentions to enter their horses by paying a US$1,000 deposit. The horses officially registered that day were Our Native, Secretariat, and Sham, along with new runners Deadly Dream, Ecole Etage, The Lark Twist, and Torsion. A day later, Deadly Dream's trainer stated that he was unsure about racing his colt because he felt the horse could not match Secretariat, Sham, or Our Native. In addition, The Lark Twist's owner Larry Boyce scratched his horse from the race because he received word that Our Native registered, dropping the total number of horses competing to six. However, on the 17th, Boyce attempted to re-enter The Lark Twist, but was denied under the Rules of Racing of Maryland which stated that the scratching of a horse was irreversible. An Associated Press article commented that the credentials of Secretariat and Sham could lead to the running being one of the smallest since 1964.

Following his record-breaking victory at the Kentucky Derby, Secretariat was the favorite. In the days between the Derby and the Preakness, groom Eddie Sweat noted that it was strange not having any rumors circulating about Secretariat's health. Sham and Secretariat were ridden by the same jockeys as in the Derby, Laffit Pincay, Jr. and Ron Turcotte, respectively. Sham was believed to have the best chance of beating Secretariat. Aside from Sham and Secretariat, Our Native was selected by Joe Nichols, a writer for The New York Times, as an outside contender for victory. In pre-race interviews, Deadly Dream's trainer Bud Delp believed he could challenge for third place as he had no "illusions about beating Secretariat and Sham."

Of the remaining contenders, Deadly Dream had won the fourth race of his three-year-old campaign at Penn National, previously winning the Allegheny Stakes and the Militia Handicap. In total, he won seven races out of the 25 he had started. Ecole Etage had won two races in the 1973 season, prior to the Preakness, the General George Stakes and the Preakness Prep. Torsion entered the race with a most recent finish of fifth place in the Preakness Prep and two wins in twelve career starts, one as a two-year-old and one as a three-year-old.

== Event details ==
Post time for the race was 5:40 PM EDT. It was broadcast over television and radio through CBS. The television coverage lasted approximately an hour, while radio coverage ran twenty minutes. The horses entering the race all carried 126 pounds. The total purse for the Preakness was $182,400, with the first through fourth-place finishers to receive $129,900, $30,000, $15,000, and $7,500, respectively. The weather during the race was clear and the course conditions were fast. The day at the Preakness was dubbed "Johnny Unitas Day" in honor of the quarterback's seventeen seasons with the Baltimore Colts, following being traded to San Diego by owner Joe Thomas before the start of the 1973 season. Members of the Johnny Unitas fan club gathered in the infield of Pimilico, the Unitas Corral.

Race officials expected a record turnout in the days leading up to the Preakness, estimating over 50,000 people. They hoped that the possibility of Secretariat completing the Triple Crown and Sham attempting to foil Secretariat's run would lead to an increase in attendance. The official attendance for the event was reported at 61,657, which surpassed the previous record of 48,721 people set in 1972. The new record lasted until 1975 when 75,216 spectators were present at Pimlico.

== Race summary ==
Out of the starting gate, Ecole Etage took the lead, ahead of Torsion, while race favorite Secretariat exited last. Sham and Deadly Dream made contact exiting the gate. While Sham was able to successfully gain stride, Deadly Dream began to run towards the railing and collided with it when entering the first turn. Going into the course's first turn, Secretariat passed two horses on the outside and passed the remainder as the horses entered the backstretch. Sham was the only horse that was able to stay with Secretariat's acceleration. Secretariat held the lead for the remainder of the race and crossed the finish line in first position, 2 1/2 lengths ahead of Sham. Our Native placed third, eight lengths behind Sham. This was the first time in the history of the Kentucky Derby and the Preakness Stakes that the top three horses in the Derby finished in the same positions at the Preakness.

== Result ==
Final results
Finish	Post	Horse	Jockey	Trainer	Owner	Final odds (Note: The odds are all to $1; for example, Secretariat's odds of winning were $0.30 on a $1.00 wager.)	Stake (Note: The total purse for the race was $182,400.)
1	3	Secretariat	Ron Turcotte	Lucien Laurin	Penny Chenery	0.30	$129,900
2	1	Sham	Laffit Pincay, Jr.	Frank "Pancho" Martin	Sigmund Sommer	3.10	$30,000
3	4	Our Native	Donald Brumfield	William J. Resseguet Jr.	E. Pritchard, E.W. Thomas, Resseguet, Jr.	11.90	$15,000
4	6	Ecole Etage	George Cusimano	Grover G. "Bud" Delp	Bon Etage Farm	11.30	$7,500
5	2	Deadly Dream	Anthony S. Black	H. E. "Buzz" Worcester III	Wide Track Farm	35.50	–
6	5	Torsion	Ben M. Feliciano	John P. Campo	Buckland Farm	39.00	–
Scratched		The Lark Twist	Paul Kallai	Larry Boyce	Larry Boyce		

=== Payout schedule ===
Preakness Stakes Payout Schedule
Post	Horse	Win	Place	Show
3	Secretariat	$2.60	$2.20	$2.20
1	Sham	–	$2.20	$2.20
4	Our Native	–	–	$2.20

- $3 Exacta: (3–1) $4.50

== Timing controversy ==
Upon the finish of the race there was a dispute over the winning time of Secretariat. The electronic Visumatic timer on the field read 1:55, while Daily Racing Form clockers Gene Schwartz and Frank Robinson timed Secretariat at 1:53 2/5, which would have broken the track record. (Note: Entering the race, the record for the Preakness was 1:54, set by Cañonero II in 1971.) The official fractional times were 25, 48 4/5, 1:12, and 1:36 1/5, while the Daily Racing Form timed the fractions at 24 2/5, 47, 1:10 2/5, and 1:35 3/5. The next day, Secretariat's trainer Lucien Laurin asked for the videotape to be reviewed because he felt that if Secretariat did run that fast, then "he deserves the record." On May 21, race officials adjusted Secretariat's winning time to 1:54 2/5, becoming the then second fastest time in race history. The time was changed to the time obtained by the official Pimilico timekeeper E.T. McLean per Rule 383 of the Maryland Rules of Racing, which stated the "official timer's time is official." McLean's stopwatch was faster than the Visumatic by three-fifths of a second at each fractional." That same day, a Visumatic official checked the timer and stated that the timer should have actually read 1:54 4/5, rather than 1:55. It was determined that the chart for the Preakness would display McLean's time as the winning time, with the Daily Racing Form time written next to it, in parentheses.

Secretariat's owner Penny Chenery and Maryland Jockey Club president Thomas Chuckas asked the Maryland Racing Commission to review the 1973 Preakness. On June 19, 2012, the commission announced their findings. During a three-hour meeting, the tapes of Secretariat's run and the three new record-holding runs were overlaid by three separate companies from which a total of five analysts reviewed the footage. Following all five analysts obtaining the time of 1:53, the commission unanimously voted to change Secretariat's time from 1:54 2/5 to 1:53, which broke the then-course record of 1:53 2/5. (Note: Since the 1973 Preakness, Cañonero II's record had since been broken. The new record, 1:53 2/5, was set by Tank’s Prospect in 1985 and was later tied by Louis Quatorze and Curlin, in 1996 and 2007, respectively.) Altering Secretariat's time allowed him to actively hold the course record for all three legs of the Triple Crown. The overlaying method used by the committee was reported to be accurate to 0.03 of a second. A representative of Chenery stated that they were "very pleased" with the decision.

== Analysis ==
By winning the Preakness, Secretariat earned his fourth victory in five races as a three-year-old. This was the first victory for Lucien Laurin in his four attempts to win the Preakness. Jockey Ron Turcotte secured his second Preakness victory, having previously won with Tom Rolfe in 1965. It was Meadow Stables' second win at the Stakes as they were previously victorious with Hill Prince in 1950. Following the race, Laurin stated that "Now, we're going to try and win the Belmont." Torsion's jockey Ben Feliciano said, in regards to Secretariat, "He's the best."

Betting on the races held that day at Pimlico Stakes totaled to $3,792,076, which set the Maryland record for amount of money wagered for the day. Off-track betting on the Preakness Stakes reached $922,989, which was included in the previous record total.

Three weeks after the Preakness, the Belmont Stakes featured a five-horse field. Secretariat won by 31 lengths with a time of 2:24 for the mile and a half, both course records in their own right. Through his combined victories at the Belmont Stakes, Preakness Stakes, and Kentucky Derby, Secretariat became the ninth horse to complete the Triple Crown of Thoroughbred Racing, and the first horse since Citation in 1948, ending a 25-year period without a Triple Crown winner. After his time in the Preakness was reviewed and found to be a record, Secretariat's times in all three Triple Crown races were stakes records and stand to this day.
