= 1973 in sports =

1973 in sports describes the year's events in world sport.

== Alpine skiing ==
- Alpine Skiing World Cup
  - Men's overall season champion: Gustav Thöni, Italy
  - Women's overall season champion: Annemarie Pröll, Austria

== American football ==
- 14 January − Super Bowl VII: the Miami Dolphins (AFC) won 14–7 over the Washington Redskins (NFC) to complete the only perfect (unbeaten and untied) season in the history of the NFL
  - Location: Los Angeles Memorial Coliseum
  - Attendance: 90,182
  - MVP: Jake Scott, FS (Miami)
- Rose Bowl (1972 season):
  - The Southern California Trojans won 42–17 over the Ohio State Buckeyes to win college football national championship
- O. J. Simpson becomes the first player in NFL history to rush for more than 2,000 yards in a single season.

== Association football ==
- Brazil – Palmeiras wins the Campeonato Brasileiro
- England – FA Cup – Sunderland wins 1–0 over Leeds United
- 1 January 1973, Edinburgh, Scotland, Edinburgh Derby between Hearts and Hibernian played at Tynecastle ends in a 7–0 victory for Hibernian.
- Philadelphia Atoms defeat Toronto Metros to win the North American Soccer League championship in their inaugural season.

== Australian rules football ==
- Victorian Football League
  - Richmond wins the 77th VFL Premiership defeating Carlton 16.20 (116) to 12.14 (86) in the Grand Final.
  - Brownlow Medal awarded to Keith Greig (North Melbourne)
- South Australian National Football League:
  - 1 September: South Adelaide kick only 1.4 (10) against Sturt's 14.24 (108) in the rain at Unley Oval, with the Panthers' sole goal being the first score of the match after five minutes. It was the lowest score in the SA(N)FL between 1914 and 2003.
  - 29 September: Glenelg 21.11 (137) defeat North Adelaide 19.16 (130) for their second SANFL premiership in what is often regarded as the great-ever SANFL Grand Final
- Western Australian National Football League
  - 29 September: Subiaco break the longest premiership drought in WANFL history, beating West Perth 10.12 (72) to 6.4 (40) for their first premiership since 1924.

== Bandy ==
- 1973 Bandy World Championship is held in the Soviet Union and won by Soviet Union.

== Baseball ==
- 18 January – Orlando Cepeda signs with the Boston Red Sox, making him the first player signed by a team specifically to be a designated hitter.
- The American League uses the designated hitter rule for the first time. Ron Blomberg is the first player to bat as a DH.
- World Series – Oakland Athletics won 4 games to 3 over the New York Mets
- Yomiuri Giants of Tokyo, takes only nine consecutive title on Japan Central League(on October 22) and Japan Series on both Japan Professional Baseball League title. (on November 1)

== Basketball ==
- NCAA Division I Men's Basketball Championship –
  - UCLA wins 87–66 over Memphis State. Bill Walton of UCLA scored 44 points in the Championship game.
- NBA Finals –
  - New York Knicks won 4 games to 1 over the Los Angeles Lakers
- ABA Finals –
  - Indiana Pacers defeat Kentucky Colonels, 4 games to 3

== Boxing ==
- 22 January – George Foreman beats Joe Frazier by a knockout in two rounds to lift the world's Heavyweight championship from Frazier. It is HBO Boxing's first telecast.

== Canadian football ==
- Grey Cup – Ottawa Rough Riders win 22–18 over the Edmonton Eskimos
- Vanier Cup – St. Mary's Huskies win 14–6 over the McGill Redmen

== Cycling ==
- Tour de France – Luis Ocaña of Spain
- UCI Road World Championships – Men's road race – Felice Gimondi, of Italy

== Dogsled racing ==
- Iditarod Trail Sled Dog Race Champion –
  - Dick Wilmarth won with lead dog: Hotfoot

== Field hockey ==
- Men's World Cup in Amstelveen, Netherlands won by the Netherlands

== Figure skating ==
- World Figure Skating Championships –
  - Men's champion: Ondrej Nepela, Czechoslovakia
  - Ladies' champion: Karen Magnussen, Canada
  - Pair skating champions: Irina Rodnina & Alexander Zaitsev, Soviet Union
  - Ice dancing champions: Lyudmila Pakhomova & Alexandr Gorshkov, Soviet Union

== Golf ==
Men's professional

- Masters Tournament – Tommy Aaron
- U.S. Open – Johnny Miller – Miller's final round of 63 was a new major championship record which has been equaled several times since, it wasn't until 2017 when that record was broken by Branden Grace at The Open Championship when he shot a 62.
- British Open – Tom Weiskopf
- PGA Championship – Jack Nicklaus
- PGA Tour money leader – Jack Nicklaus – $308,362
- Ryder Cup – United States won 19–13 over Great Britain & Ireland in team golf.

Men's amateur

- British Amateur – Dick Siderowf
- U.S. Amateur – Craig Stadler

Women's professional

- LPGA Championship – Mary Mills
- U.S. Women's Open – Susie Berning
- LPGA Tour money leader – Kathy Whitworth – $82,864

== Harness racing ==
- United States Pacing Triple Crown races –
  1. Cane Pace – Smog
  2. Little Brown Jug – Melvin's Woe
  3. Messenger Stakes – Valiant Bret
- United States Trotting Triple Crown races –
  1. Hambletonian – Flirth
  2. Yonkers Trot – Tamerlane
  3. Kentucky Futurity – Arnie Almahurst
- Australian Inter Dominion Harness Racing Championship –
  - Pacers: Hondo Grattan
  - Trotters: Precocious

== Horse racing ==
- Secretariat, ridden by jockey Ron Turcotte, becomes the first horse in 25 years to win all three United States Triple Crown Races

Steeplechases

- Cheltenham Gold Cup – The Dikler
- Grand National – Red Rum

Flat races

- Australia – Melbourne Cup – Gala Supreme
- Canada – Queen's Plate – Royal Chocolate
- France – Prix de l'Arc de Triomphe – Rheingold
- Ireland – Irish Derby Stakes – Weavers' Hall
- English Triple Crown Races:
  1. 2,000 Guineas Stakes – Mon Fils
  2. The Derby – Morston
  3. St. Leger Stakes – Peleid
- United States Triple Crown Races:
  1. Kentucky Derby – Secretariat
  2. Preakness Stakes – Secretariat
  3. Belmont Stakes – Secretariat

== Ice hockey ==
- Art Ross Trophy as the NHL's leading scorer during the regular season: Phil Esposito, Boston Bruins
- Hart Memorial Trophy for the NHL's Most Valuable Player: Bobby Clarke – Philadelphia Flyers
- Stanley Cup – Montreal Canadiens defeat the Chicago Blackhawks 4 games to 2
- World Hockey Association
  - AVCO Cup – New England Whalers defeat the Winnipeg Jets 4 games to 1 for first league championship.
- World Hockey Championship –
  - Men's champion: Soviet Union defeated Sweden
- NCAA Men's Ice Hockey Championship – University of Wisconsin–Madison Badgers defeat University of Denver Pioneers 4–2 in Boston

== Lacrosse ==
- NCAA Division I Men's Championship – University of Maryland Terrapins defeated Johns Hopkins University Bluejays 10–9 in 2 overtimes.

== Radiosport ==
- Seventh Amateur Radio Direction Finding European Championship held in Komló, Hungary.
- First ARRL 10 Meter Contest held in December.

== Rugby league ==
- 1973 Kangaroo tour of Great Britain and France
- Captain Morgan Trophy
- 1973 New Zealand rugby league season
- 1973 NSWRFL season
- 1972–73 Northern Rugby Football League season / 1973–74 Northern Rugby Football League season

== Rugby union ==
- 79th Five Nations Championship series is a five-way tie with all teams winning two matches each

== Snooker ==
- World Snooker Championship – Ray Reardon beats Eddie Charlton 38–32

== Swimming ==
- The first FINA World Championships held in Belgrade, Yugoslavia

== Tennis ==
- Grand Slam in tennis men's results:
  1. Australian Open – John Newcombe
  2. French Open – Ilie Năstase
  3. Wimbledon – Jan Kodeš
  4. US Open – John Newcombe
- Grand Slam in tennis women's results:
  1. Australian Open – Margaret Court
  2. French Open – Margaret Court
  3. Wimbledon – Billie Jean King
  4. US Open – Margaret Court
- Davis Cup – Australia wins 5–0 over the United States in world tennis.
- Men and women players receive equal prize money at the US Open
- 20 September – In the famed Battle of the sexes at Houston's Astrodome – Billie Jean King beat Bobby Riggs in 3straight sets.

== Water polo ==
- 1973 FINA Men's World Water Polo Championship held in Belgrade and won by Hungary

== General sporting events ==
- Second All-Africa Games held in Lagos, Nigeria
- Seventh Summer Universiade held in Moscow, Soviet Union

== Awards ==
- Associated Press Male Athlete of the Year – O. J. Simpson, National Football League
- Associated Press Female Athlete of the Year – Billie Jean King, Tennis
