= Upper Case =

American Thoroughbred racehorse (1969–1986)

- Sire: Round Table
- Grandsire: Princequillo
- Dam: Bold Experience
- Damsire: Bold Ruler
- Sex: Stallion
- Foaled: February 27, 1969
- Country: United States
- Colour: Bay
- Breeder: Meadow Stable
- Owner: Meadow Stable
- Trainer: Lucien Laurin
- Record: 21: 6-4-1
- Earnings: $241,310

Major wins
- Florida Derby (1972); Wood Memorial Stakes (1972)

Upper Case was an American Thoroughbred racehorse best known for winning the 1972 Florida Derby and Wood Memorial Stakes. A Meadow Stable colt, he was a stablemate of Riva Ridge.

== Background ==
Upper Case was a bay colt foaled on February 27, 1969, in Kentucky. He was sired by Round Table out of the mare Bold Experience, a daughter of Bold Ruler. Bold Experience was a stakes winner (including the 1964 Sorority Stakes) and a granddaughter of Meadow Stable's foundation mare Hildene. Bred and owned by Meadow Stable (Christopher Chenery and later Penny Chenery), he was trained by Lucien Laurin. As a young horse he damaged his sinuses by lunging at the starting gate, resulting in intermittent breathing problems that affected him throughout his career.

== Racing career ==
Upper Case made 21 starts, recording 6 wins, 4 seconds and 1 third, with earnings of $241,310. As a two-year-old in 1971 he started four times, winning once and finishing second once. In January and February 1972, he contested four allowance races at Gulfstream Park (three on grass), winning two and finishing second in the other two.

On March 2, 1972, ridden by Ron Turcotte, he won the Florida Derby by a length after rallying from sixth place. Nine days later he finished second to Hold Your Peace in the Flamingo Stakes with a time of 1:48 1/5. He then finished third in the Gotham Stakes, beaten 1 1/2 lengths after closing from eighth. On a sloppy track he won the Wood Memorial by 1½ lengths under a hand ride, taking the lead on the far turn and defeating True Knight. He finished fifth, beaten 5 1/2 lengths, in a Preakness prep and ran poorly in the Jersey Derby when again affected by his breathing difficulties.

After being sold, Upper Case won an allowance race on grass at Belmont Park (shortened to seven furlongs) but finished out of the money in six of his seven subsequent starts. Turcotte was his primary jockey for most of his three-year-old campaign.

== Stud career ==
Following the Jersey Derby, Upper Case was sold for $750,000 to a group of Irish buyers and was retired to stud in Ireland at the end of 1972. As a sire he produced 249 winners and 18 black-type winners from 364 starters; his best offspring were generally turf performers. His most successful son was Flying Pidgeon, a Grade 1 winner on turf who earned more than $1.1 million and later stood at Old Friends. Upper Case returned to Florida around 1978 and continued to stand at stud there. He died in 1986 at the age of 17.
