= Garden State Stakes =

- Class: Discontinued horse
- Location: Garden State Park Racetrack; Cherry Hill, New Jersey
- Race type: Thoroughbred – Flat racing

Race information
- Distance: various
- Surface: Dirt and Turf
- Track: left-handed
- Qualification: Two-years-old

The Garden State Stakes was an American Thoroughbred horse race held annually in mid November at the now defunct Garden State Park Racetrack in Cherry Hill, New Jersey. A futurity event for two-year-olds, it is sometimes referred to as the Garden State Futurity. In 1953, it became the richest horse race in the world with a purse above $300,000, before being surpassed by the Arlington-Washington Futurity Stakes in 1962.

The race was contested on dirt until 1994 when it was changed to a race on turf. It was raced at various distances:

- On dirt:
- Inception – 1952: 6 furlongs on dirt
- 1953–1972, 1993: 1 1/16 miles on dirt
- 1985–1992: 1 1/8 miles on dirt
- 1998 : 1 mile on dirt (1998 race switched from turf due to heavy rains)
- On turf:
- 1994–1995 : 1 1/16 miles on turf
- 1996–1997, 1999 : 1 mile on turf

In 1955, the racetrack created a counterpart for fillies called the Gardenia Stakes.

The Garden State Stakes was placed on hiatus in 1973 and after a fire destroyed the racetrack on April 14, 1977 it would not be run again until a new track was built by International Thoroughbred Breeders, Inc. through its wholly owned subsidiary, Garden State Race Track, Inc. headed by Robert E. Brennan that opened on April 1, 1985. The March 18, 2000, issue of The Philadelphia Inquirer reported that the Garden State Stakes had been cancelled for financial reasons.

== Winners ==
Year	Winner	Jockey	Trainer	Owner	Dist. (Furlongs)	Time
1999	Judges' View	Jesus Castanon	Luis Collazo	Lee A. Rogalski	8 F	1:39.10
1998	Who Did It and Run	Felix Ortiz	Debra Sones	Debra Sones	8 F	1:36.51
1997	Keep it Strait	Charles C. Lopez	Joseph H. Pierce Jr.	M. Delfiner & A. Gilman	8 F	1:43.05
1996	Fitz	Victor Molina	Edward Colettti Jr.	Ken and Sarah Ramsey	8 F	1:40.69
1995	Claramount Hill	Julie Krone	Philip M. Serpe	Double R. Stable	8.5 F	1:44.26
1994	Alleged Impression	Mario Verge	Eddie Gaudet	Morris Bailey	8.5 F	1:44.56
1993	Tri For The Gold	Matthew Vigliotti	Robert Seeger	Plumstead Stables	8.5 F	1:45.02
1992	Fling	Nick Santagata	Ronald Glorioso	Prescott & Pamela McCardell	9 F	1:53.58
1991	Tank	Rick Wilson	Benjamin W. Perkins Jr.	Bohemia Stable	9 F	1:51.03
1990	Killer Diller	James Bruin	Frank A. Alexander	Barry K. Schwartz	9 F	1:52.40
1989	Faultless Ensign	Chris DeCarlo	Benjamin W. Perkins Jr.	B. W. Perkins Sr./Anthony Tornetta	9 F	1:51.20
1988	Tsarbaby	Herb McCauley	D. Wayne Lukas	Peter M. Brant	9 F	1:52.20
1987	Mister S M	Frank Lovato Jr.	Stephen L. DiMauro	Samuel F. Morrell	9 F	1:49.80
1986	Fobby Forbes	Randy Romero	Carlos Garcia	Due Process Stable	9 F	1:51.00
1985	Spend a Buck	Ángel Cordero Jr.	Cam Gambolati	Hunter Farm	9 F	1:45.80
1972	Secretariat	Ron Turcotte	Lucien Laurin	Meadow Stable	8.5 F	1:44.40
1971	Riva Ridge	Ron Turcotte	Lucien Laurin	Meadow Stable	8.5 F	1:43.60
1970	Run the Gantlet	John L. Rotz	J. Elliott Burch	Rokeby Stable	8.5 F	1:45.00
1969	Forum	Walter Blum	Eugene Jacobs	Herbert A. Allen Sr.	8.5 F	1:44.40
1968	Beau Brummel	Braulio Baeza	Edward A. Neloy	Ogden Mills Phipps	8.5 F	1:44.60
1967	Bugged	Eddie Belmonte	Ivor G. Balding	C. V. Whitney	8.5 F	1:44.80
1966	Successor	Braulio Baeza	Edward A. Neloy	Wheatley Stable	8.5 F	1:44.20
1965	Prince Saim	Joe Culmone	Al Pepino	Pepino brothers	8.5 F	1.42.80
1964	Sadair	Manuel Ycaza	Les Lear	North Forty Stable	8.5 F	1:41.00
1963	Hurry to Market	W. C. Cook	David Erb	Roger Wilson/Mrs. T. P. Hull Jr.	8.5 F	1:45.20
1962	Crewman	Bill Shoemaker	Winbert F. Mulholland	George D. Widener Jr.	8.5 F	1:44.00
1961	Crimson Satan	Bill Shoemaker	Gordon R. Potter	Crimson King Farm	8.5 F	1:44.20
1960	Carry Back	Johnny Sellers	Jack A. Price	Mrs. Katherine Price	8.5 F	1:46.40
1959	Warfare	Ismael Valenzuela	Hack Ross	Bellehurst Stable (Clifton Jones Jr.)	8.5 F	1:42.80
1958	First Landing	Eddie Arcaro	Casey Hayes	Christopher Chenery	8.5 F	1:46.40
1957	Nadir	Bill Hartack	Moody Jolley	Claiborne Farm	8.5 F	1:44.20
1956	Barbizon	Bill Hartack	Horace A. Jones	Calumet Farm	8.5 F	1:44.80
1955	Prince John	Angel Valenzuela	Walter A. Kelley	Elmendorf Farm	8.5 F	1:42.60
1954	Summer Tan	Eric Guerin	Sherrill W. Ward	Dorothy Firestone	8.5 F	1:46.20
1953	Turn-To	Henry Moreno	Eddie Hayward	Cain Hoy Stable	8.5 F	1:46.20
1952	Laffango	Nick Shuk	Merritt A. Buxton	Trio Stable	6 F	1:11.40
1951	Candle Wood	Chris Rogers	Lyman A. Brusie	Robert C. Hanna	6 F	1:11.80
1950	Iswas	Joe Culmone	Dan W. Kerns	Brookfield Farm	6 F	1:11.40
1949	Cornwall	Bob Strange	B. Frank Christmas	Abram S. Hewitt	6 F	1:11.40
1948	Blue Peter	Wayne Wright	Andy Schuttinger	Joseph M. Roebling	5 F	1:00.80
1947	Itsabet	Don Padgett	Dan W. Kerns	Brookfield Farm	6 F	1:11.60
1946	Double Jay	Johnny Breen	Walter L. McCue	Ridgewood Stable	6 F	1:11.00
1945	Air Rate	Harry Pratt	Ralph Lentini	Frederick Wyse	6 F	1:13.20
1944	Alexis		John A. Healey	Christiana Stable	6 F	
