= 1972 Kentucky Derby =

Horse race

98th Kentucky Derby
- Kentucky Derby
- Grade I stakes race
- Location: Churchill Downs
- Date: May 6, 1972
- Winning horse: Riva Ridge
- Jockey: Ron Turcotte
- Trainer: Lucien Laurin
- Owner: Meadow Stable
- Conditions: Fast
- Surface: Dirt
- Attendance: 130,564

The 1972 Kentucky Derby was the 98th running of the Kentucky Derby. The race took place on May 6, 1972, with 130,564 people in attendance.

== Full results ==
Finished	Post	Horse	Jockey	Trainer	Owner	Time / behind
1st	7	Riva Ridge	Ron Turcotte	Lucien Laurin	Meadow Stable	2:01 4/5
2nd	11	No Le Hace	Phil Rubbicco	Homer C. Pardue	Joseph W. Straus	
3rd	3	Hold Your Peace	Carlos Marquez	Arnold N. Winick	Maribel G. Blum	
4th	4	Introductivo	Robert Breen	Stanley M. Rieser	Mr. & Mrs. C. J. Robertson Sr.	
5th	2	Sensitive Music	John L. Rotz	Grover W. Stephens	Forrest H. Lindsay	
6th	1	Freetex	Chuck Baltazar	William T. Raymond	Middletown Stable	
7th	16f	Big Spruce	Larry Adams	Victor J. Nickerson	Maxwell H. Gluck	
8th	10	Head of the River	Michael Hole	J. Elliott Burch	Rokeby Stables	
9th	5	Big Brown Bear	Ray Broussard	Alex A. Fiore	Mr. & Mrs. Arthur E. Reinhold	
10th	6	Kentuckian	Donald Brumfield	Paul K. Parker	Preston W. Madden	
11th	9	Hassi's Image	Heliodoro Gustines	Juan Arias	Hassi Shina	
12th	14f	Majestic Needle	Mike Manganello	Ike K. Mourar	Robert E. Lehmann	
13th	13f	Our Trade Winds	Jim Nichols	Robert E. Holthus	Robert Mitchell	
14th	15f	Napoise	Robert Kotenko	Ike K. Mourar	Robert E. Lehmann	
15th	12f	Dr. Neale	Wendell Leeling	Charles E. Nicholas	Charles E. Nicholas	
16th	8	Pacallo	Gustavo Ávila	Leo Sierra	Walnut Hill Farm	
