= First Landing (horse) =

American-bred Thoroughbred racehorse

- Sire: Turn-To
- Grandsire: Royal Charger
- Dam: Hildene
- Damsire: Bubbling Over
- Sex: Stallion
- Foaled: 1956
- Country: United States
- Colour: Bay
- Breeder: Meadow Stud, Inc.
- Owner: Meadow Stable
- Trainer: Casey Hayes
- Record: 37:19–9–2
- Earnings: $779,577

Major wins
- Champagne Stakes (1958); Great American Stakes (1958); Juvenile Stakes (1958); Monmouth Handicap (1958); Hopeful Stakes (1958); Saratoga Special Stakes (1958); Garden State Futurity (1958); Derby Trial (1959); Everglades Stakes (1959)

Awards
- U.S. Champion 2-Year-Old Colt (1958)
- Last updated on November 20, 2006

First Landing (March 7, 1956 – 1987) was an American Thoroughbred racehorse.

== Background ==
Sired by Turn-To, a grandson of the great Nearco, he was out of the mare Hildene, whose sire was the 1926 Kentucky Derby winner, Bubbling Over. Hildene was completely blind and died when First Landing was a yearling.

== Racing career ==
Nicknamed "Lazy Bones", First Landing was the American Champion Two-Year-Old Colt. One of his best wins came at Saratoga in August when he took the Hopeful Stakes by five and a half lengths from First Minister.

He did not achieve the same success racing at age three. In the 1959 racing season, he finished second in the Wood Memorial Stakes. Then, after winning the Derby Trial, he was made the betting favorite for the Kentucky Derby. However, ridden by Eddie Arcaro, he finished a well-beaten third behind Sword Dancer and the winner: English-bred Tomy Lee.

== Stud record ==
Retired to Christopher Chenery's stud farm, First Landing sired a number of graded stakes race winners including Jim J. (1964), Balustrade (1965), Artfully (1973), Stutz Bearcat (1975), and his most important, U.S. Racing Hall of Fame inductee Riva Ridge, who won the 1972 Kentucky Derby and Belmont Stakes.

== Death ==
First Landing died at the age of 31 in 1987.
