= T. N. Srinivasan =

Indian economist (1933–2018)

- Born: March 27, 1933; Tirupati
- Died: November 11, 2018 (aged 85); Chennai
- Occupation: Economist
- Title: Samuel C Park Jr. Professor Emeritus of Economics

Academic background
- Education: University of Madras, B.A., 1953; University of Madras, M.A., 1954; Yale University, Ph.D., 1962
- Thesis: Investment Criteria and Choice of Techniques of Production (1961)
- Doctoral advisor: Tjalling Koopmans

Academic work
- Discipline: Economics
- Institutions: Indian Statistical Institute; MIT, Stanford University; Yale University

T. N. Srinivasan, in full Thirukodikaval Nilakanta Srinivasan (27 March 1933 – 11 November 2018), was an Indian economist who had taught and worked in the United States. He was the Emeritus Samuel C. Park Jr. Professor of Economics at Yale University. He was formerly chairman of the department of economics. He was a special adviser to the Development Research Center at the World Bank from 1977 to 1980, and taught at numerous academic institutions for over four decades, including MIT, Stanford University, and the Indian Statistical Institute. In 2007, he received a Padma Bhushan decoration from the President of India for his contributions to Literature and Education.

He earned his Ph.D. in economics (1962) from Yale University, M.A. in mathematics (1954) from University of Madras, India and B.A. (Honors) Mathematics 1953 from University of Madras, India. He did his Professional Training in Statistics (1953-1955) at Indian Statistical Institute, Calcutta. He has made important contributions in the fields of economic growth and development economics, and international trade. He had been very active in policy debates concerning India. He was also the founding co-editor of the Journal of Development Economics.

He was visiting fellow at the Center for Research on Economic Development and Policy Reform, Stanford University; fellow of the Econometric Society, American Academy of Arts and Sciences, and American Philosophical Society; and a foreign associate of the National Academy of Sciences of the US. He has authored a prolific collection of books and articles on econometrics, world trade, and developing country economics.

== Selected bibliography ==
=== Books ===
- Srinivasan, T.N.; Chenery, Hollis (1988). Handbook of development economics. Vol. 1. Amsterdam New York New York, N.Y., U.S.A.: North-Holland Sole distributors for the U.S.A. and Canada, Elsevier Science Pub. Co. ISBN 9780444703378.
- Srinivasan, T.N.; Chenery, Hollis (1988). Handbook of development economics. Vol. 2. Amsterdam New York New York, N.Y., U.S.A.: North-Holland Sole distributors for the U.S.A. and Canada, Elsevier Science Pub. Co. ISBN 9780444703385.
- Srinivasan, T.N.; Chenery, Hollis (1988). Handbook of development economics. Vol. 3A. Amsterdam New York New York, N.Y., U.S.A.: North-Holland Sole distributors for the U.S.A. and Canada, Elsevier Science Pub. Co. ISBN 9780444823014.
- Srinivasan, T.N.; Behrman, Jere (1988). Handbook of development economics. Vol. 3B. Amsterdam New York New York, N.Y., U.S.A.: North-Holland Sole distributors for the U.S.A. and Canada, Elsevier Science Pub. Co. ISBN 9780444823021.
