= Outstandingly =

American-bred Thoroughbred racehorse

- Sire: Exclusive Native
- Grandsire: Raise a Native
- Dam: La Mesa
- Damsire: Round Table
- Sex: Filly
- Foaled: March 25, 1982
- Country: United States
- Colour: Bay
- Breeder: Harbor View Farm
- Owner: Harbor View Farm
- Trainer: Pancho Martin; Laz Barrera
- Record: 28: 10-4-3
- Earnings: US$1,412,206

Major wins
- Hollywood Starlet Stakes (1984); Las Palmas Handicap (1986); A Gleam Handicap (1986); Wilshire Handicap (1986); Santa Lucia Handicap (1986) Breeders' Cup wins: Breeders' Cup Juvenile Fillies (1984)

Awards
- American Champion Two-Year-Old Filly (1984)

Outstandingly (March 25, 1982 – October 10, 2003) was an American Thoroughbred racehorse who was voted an Eclipse Award as the American Champion Two-Year-Old Filly of 1984.

== Background ==
Bred and raced by Louis and Patrice Wolfson's Harbor View Farm, Outstandingly was trained by U.S. Racing Hall of Fame inductees Pancho Martin and Laz Barrera.

== Racing career ==
Racing in California at age two, Outstandingly won the Grade 1 Hollywood Starlet Stakes followed by the first running of the Breeders' Cup Juvenile Fillies hosted by Hollywood Park Racetrack when Fran's Valentine was disqualified. Her performances set an earnings record for two-year-old fillies of $867,872.

Outstandingly won only once in seven starts as a three-year-old but came back at age four in 1986 with five wins under new trainer Laz Barrera, two of which were in graded stakes races. At age five, she made two starts, winning once and was then retired to broodmare duty.

== Breeding record ==
In foal to Caro, Outstandingly was sold by the Wolfsons in November 1988 at the Fasig-Tipton sale. She drew the auction's highest price at US$1,150,000, paid by Darley Stud. As a broodmare, the top runner among her foals was her daughter Sensation (b. 1993) who in 1996 won the Prix de Bagatelle and Prix de Sandringham in France, and the Falmouth Stakes in England for owner Sheikh Maktoum Al Maktoum.

Reported to be suffering from chronic laminitis, on October 10, 2003, the 21-year-old Outstandingly was humanely euthanized at Gainsborough Farm near Lexington, Kentucky.

Pedigree of Outstandingly
Sire Exclusive Native	Raise a Native	Native Dancer	Polynesian
Sire Exclusive Native	Raise a Native	Native Dancer	Geisha
Sire Exclusive Native	Raise a Native	Raise You	Case Ace
Sire Exclusive Native	Raise a Native	Raise You	Lady Glory
Sire Exclusive Native	Exclusive	Shut Out	Equipoise
Sire Exclusive Native	Exclusive	Shut Out	Goose Egg
Sire Exclusive Native	Exclusive	Good Example	Pilate
Sire Exclusive Native	Exclusive	Good Example	Parade Girl
Dam La Mesa	Round Table	Princequillo	Prince Rose
Dam La Mesa	Round Table	Princequillo	Cosquilla
Dam La Mesa	Round Table	Knight's Daughter	Sir Cosmo
Dam La Mesa	Round Table	Knight's Daughter	Feola
Dam La Mesa	Finance	Nasrullah	Nearco
Dam La Mesa	Finance	Nasrullah	Mumtaz Begum
Dam La Mesa	Finance	Busanda	War Admiral
Dam La Mesa	Finance	Busanda	Businesslike (family 1-x)
