= Hollis B. Chenery =

American economist

Hollis Chenery

Chief Economist of the World Bank
- In office 1972–1982
- President: Robert McNamara; Alden W. Clausen
- Preceded by: Position established
- Succeeded by: Anne Osborn Krueger

Personal details
- Born: Hollis Burnley Chenery; 6 January 1918 Richmond, Virginia, U.S.
- Died: 1 September 1994 (aged 76) Santa Fe, New Mexico, U.S.
- Spouses: Louise Seamster (m. 1942; div. 1964) Mary Montgomery (m. 1970; died 1993)
- Children: 2
- Relatives: Christopher Chenery (Father); Penny Chenery (Sister)
- Education: University of Arizona (BS); University of Oklahoma (BS); California Institute of Technology (MS); University of Virginia (MA); Harvard University (PhD)
- Scientific career
- Fields: Development economics
- Institutions: World Bank; Harvard University; Stanford University
- Thesis: Engineering bases of economic analysis (1950)

Hollis Burnley Chenery (January 6, 1918 – September 1, 1994) was an American economist well known for his pioneering contribution in the field of development economics.

== Early life ==
Chenery was born in Richmond, son of Christopher Chenery, a businessman and horseman. He was educated in Virginia, Pelham Manor, New York and at the University of Arizona (BS Mathematics, 1939), the University of Oklahoma (BS Engineering, 1941), and California Institute of Technology (MS Engineering, 1943). He served in the United States Army Air Forces in World War II. After the war he earned degrees from the University of Virginia (MA Economics, 1947) and Harvard University (PhD Economics, 1950). His doctoral dissertation, entitled Engineering Bases of Economic Analysis, was written under the direction of Wassily Leontief.

== Career ==
He worked as a professor of economics at Stanford from 1952 to 1961, as a Guggenheim fellow in 1961 and joined the United States Agency for International Development in 1961, and rose to become an assistant administrator.

In 1965 Chenery became a professor of economics at Harvard. His 1966 article with Alan Strout, "Foreign assistance and economic development", provided a macro-economic theory of development aid's effectiveness which remained, for the following 20 years or more, the most explicit model available.

Chenery worked as the World Bank's vice president for development policy from 1972 through to 1982. Serving under the presidency of Robert McNamara during most of his time at the Bank, Chenery oversaw an increase in the Bank's research capacity. Although his earlier work had played a part in fixing the focus of aid on targets for overall economic growth, Chenery in the 1970s investigated ways in which this growth could take place in such a way as to benefit the poor. This research – which was published notably in the 1974 book Redistribution with growth – helped the Bank move to a more poverty-focused approach in the mid- and late 1970s.

Chenery's work was wide-ranging but might be summarised as involving the analysis of patterns of development, the use of a two-gap model and multi-sectoral analysis.

== Horse racing fame ==
After his father died in January 1973, his sister Penny Chenery raced Secretariat on behalf of the family. Secretariat became the first horse in 25 years to win the American Triple Crown, with record-setting victories in the Kentucky Derby, the Preakness and the Belmont Stakes. After Secretariat's victory in the Belmont Stakes, Hollis Chenery led the horse down the walkway to the winner's circle as cameras took pictures and the crowd gave a standing ovation. He was played by Dylan Baker in the 2010 film Secretariat.

== Selected works ==
His major works include:

- Chenery, Hollis. (1952). Overcapacity and the acceleration principle., Econometrica
- Abramovitz, Moses (1959), "The welfare interpretation of secular trends in national income and product", in Abramovitz, Moses; et al. (eds.), The allocation of economic resources: essays in honor of Bernard Francis Haley, Stanford, California: Stanford University Press, OCLC 490147128. ISBN 9780804705684.
- Chenery, Hollis; Clark, P. (1959). Interindustry economics.
- Chenery, Hollis. (1960). Patterns of industrial growth., American Economic Review
- Chenery, Hollis. (1961). Comparative advantage and development policy., American Economic Review
- Chenery, Hollis; Strout, A. (1966). Foreign assistance and economic development., American Economic Review
- Chenery, Hollis; et al. (1971). Studies in development planning.
- Chenery, Hollis; et al. (1974). Redistibution with growth: an approach to policy.
- Chenery, Hollis; Syrquin, R. (1975). Patterns of development, 1950–1970.
- Chenery, Hollis. (1975). A structuralist approach to development policy, 1975., American Economic Review
- Chenery, Hollis. (1979). Structural change and development policy.
- Chenery, Hollis. (1983). Interaction between theory and observation, world development.
- Chenery, Hollis; Srinivasan, T.N. (1988). Handbook of development economics. Vol. 1. Amsterdam New York New York, N.Y., U.S.A: North-Holland Sole distributors for the U.S.A. and Canada, Elsevier Science Pub. Co. ISBN 9780444703378.
- Chenery, Hollis; Srinivasan, T.N. (1988). Handbook of development economics. Vol. 2. Amsterdam New York New York, N.Y., U.S.A: North-Holland Sole distributors for the U.S.A. and Canada, Elsevier Science Pub. Co. ISBN 9780444703385.

Diplomatic posts
New office	Chief Economist of the World Bank; 1972–1982	Succeeded by Anne Osborn Krueger
