= Quill (horse) =

American-bred Thoroughbred racehorse

- Sire: Princequillo
- Grandsire: Prince Rose
- Dam: Quick Touch
- Damsire: Count Fleet
- Sex: Filly
- Foaled: 1956
- Country: United States
- Color: Chestnut
- Breeder: Reginald N. Webster
- Owner: Reginald N. Webster
- Trainer: Lucien Laurin
- Record: 26: 14-4-2
- Earnings: $386,041

Major wins
- Gardenia Stakes (1958); Matron Stakes (1958); Mother Goose Stakes (1959); Acorn Stakes (1959); Delaware Handicap (1960); New Castle Stakes (1960)

Awards
- American Champion Two-Year-Old Filly (1958)
- Last updated on March 9, 2021

Quill (foaled 1956 in Kentucky) was an American Thoroughbred racehorse who was the 1958 Champion Two-Year-Old Filly in the United States.

== Racing career ==
Quill was the first Champion for future U.S. and Canadian Hall of Fame trainer Lucien Laurin. In her 1958 championship year Quill's major wins came in the Gardenia Stakes at New Jersey's Garden State Park and the Matron Stakes at Belmont Park in New York.

== Broodmare ==
Following her retirement from racing Quill became a successful broodmare.

Bred to the 20th Century's most influential stallion Northern Dancer, a winner of the 1964 Kentucky Derby and Preakness Stakes, Quill was the dam of the 1966 colt One For All whose stakes wins included the Canadian International Championship, Laurel Turf Cup Handicap, Pan American Handicap, Sunset Handicap and the Niagara Handicap.

In 1971 Quill was bred to Northern Dancer's son, the 1970 English Triple Crown winner Nijinsky. That match produced the 1972 foal Caucasus who won the Irish St Leger before being sent to compete in North America. There, his stakes wins included the Arcadia, Manhattan, San Luis Rey and Sunset Handicaps.

== Pedigree ==
Pedigree of Quill, chestnut mare, 1956
Sire Princequillo	Prince Rose	Rose Prince	Prince Palatine
Sire Princequillo	Prince Rose	Rose Prince	Eglantine
Sire Princequillo	Prince Rose	Indolence	Gay Crusader
Sire Princequillo	Prince Rose	Indolence	Barrier
Sire Princequillo	Cosquilla	Papyrus	Tracery
Sire Princequillo	Cosquilla	Papyrus	Miss Matty
Sire Princequillo	Cosquilla	Quick Thought	White Eagle
Sire Princequillo	Cosquilla	Quick Thought	Mindful
Dam Quick Touch	Count Fleet	Reigh Count	Sunreigh
Dam Quick Touch	Count Fleet	Reigh Count	Contessina
Dam Quick Touch	Count Fleet	Quickly	Haste
Dam Quick Touch	Count Fleet	Quickly	Stephanie
Dam Quick Touch	Alms	St. Brideaux	St. Germans
Dam Quick Touch	Alms	St. Brideaux	Panache
Dam Quick Touch	Alms	Bonus	All Gold
Dam Quick Touch	Alms	Bonus	Remembrance (family: 5-g)
