= Pancho Martin =

American horse trainer (1925–2012)

Frank "Pancho" Martin
Personal information
- Born: December 3, 1925 Cuba
- Died: July 18, 2012 (aged 86)
- Occupation: Trainer

Horse racing career
- Sport: Horse racing
- Career wins: 3,284

Major racing wins
- Wood Memorial Stakes (1959, 1974); Display Handicap (1970, 1971, 1972, 1973, 1978); Brooklyn Handicap (1971); Discovery Handicap (1971, 1974); Manhattan Handicap (1971); Tremont Stakes (1971); Suburban Handicap (1972); Jockey Club Gold Cup (1972); Santa Anita Derby (1973); Santa Anita Handicap (1974); Gotham Stakes (1974); Toboggan Handicap (1977, 1998); Bay Shore Stakes (1978); Morven Stakes (1980); Massachusetts Handicap (1980); Whirlaway Stakes (1998); Breeders' Cup wins: Breeders' Cup Juvenile Fillies (1984)

Racing awards
- U. S. Champion Thoroughbred Trainer by earnings (1974)

Honours
- National Museum of Racing and Hall of Fame (1981)

Significant horses
- Autobiography, Sham, Knightly Dawn, Rube the Great, Accipiter, Outstandingly

Frank "Pancho" Martin (December 3, 1925 – July 18, 2012) was a United States' Hall of Fame trainer of Thoroughbred racehorses. He is often remembered as the trainer of Sham, the horse that placed second to Secretariat in two legs of the 1973 U. S. Triple Crown series. Martin was the racing industry's leading purse winner in 1974 and the leading trainer in New York state from 1973 to 1982.

== Biography ==
Martin was born in Cuba. He began working at the track when he was 12 years old, starting as a hotwalker (walking horses after a run or workout) and becoming a trainer by the age of 16. While he could not recall the name of his first winning horse in Cuba, he was racing Cuban horses in Ohio, Florida, and New England by the time he was 21. By 1951, Martin had moved to the United States and settled in New York.

Some of his top horses include: Manassa Mauler, who won the Wood Memorial Stakes in 1959; Never Bow, the Brooklyn Handicap winner in 1971; Hitchcock, the Suburban Handicap winner in 1972; Autobiography, the nation's Top Older Horse in 1972; Rube the Great, who won the Wood Memorial in 1974; Outstandingly, who won the Breeders' Cup Juvenile Fillies in 1984 and the Eclipse Award for top 2-year-old filly; and Watch the Bird, the Whirlaway Stakes winner in 1998. Martin was the industry's leading purse winner in 1984, and through 2009 won 3,284 races and purses totaling $46,881,516. He was inducted into the National Museum of Racing and Hall of Fame in 1981.

Martin's son, Jose, and grandson, Carlos, have gone on to have successful careers as trainers of Thoroughbred racehorses as well. Jose Martin, who had been diagnosed with lung cancer, died in 2006.

== Sham ==
Martin's most memorable (and favorite) horse was Sham, winner of the 1973 Santa Anita Derby and runner up to Secretariat in the Kentucky Derby and Preakness Stakes. Sham was owned by Martin's longtime clients Viola and Sigmund Sommer. He placed second at the Kentucky Derby, clocking in unofficially in 1:59 4/5. He ran neck and neck with Secretariat at the Belmont Stakes in the third leg of the Triple Crown, briefly taking the front spot until the back stretch, when Secretariat pulled away and Sham finished last.

== Secretariat: The Movie ==
Martin received negative treatment in the Disney film Secretariat, serving as the film's antagonist. Martin, portrayed by actor Nestor Serrano, is shown laying personal insults on the Secretariat team and proclaiming during a press conference that the horse is not worthy to compete with Sham. Jockey Ron Turcotte, who rode Secretariat to victory, said about Martin's portrayal: "It wasn't that way."

== Death ==
After a lengthy illness, Martin died at age 86 on July 18, 2012, at his Garden City home.
