= Sham (horse) =

American Thoroughbred racehorse

- Sham at the 1973 Santa Anita Derby
- Sire: Pretense
- Grandsire: Endeavour
- Dam: Seqoia
- Damsire: Princequillo
- Sex: Stallion
- Foaled: 1970
- Country: USA
- Colour: Dark Bay
- Breeder: Claiborne Farm
- Owner: Claiborne Farm; Sigmund Sommer
- Trainer: Frank "Pancho" Martin
- Jockey: Laffit Pincay Jr.
- Record: 13: 5–5–1
- Earnings: $204,808

Major wins
- Santa Catalina Stakes (1973); Santa Anita Derby (1973) American Classic Race placing: Kentucky Derby 2nd (1973); Preakness Stakes 2nd (1973)

Honours
- Sham Stakes at Santa Anita Park

Sham (April 9, 1970 – April 3, 1993) was an American thoroughbred race horse and leading three year-old in 1973. He was overshadowed by his more famous peer, Secretariat. Sham was dark bay, almost black in color. He raced in the green and yellow silks of his owners, Sigmund and Viola Sommer, with matching blinkers. His running style was that of a stalker, preferring to run behind the early leaders and gradually improving his position nearing the finish. Sham was a large horse at 16.2 hh. He also had a very large heart, about twice the size of the average horse's, as discovered during the necropsy following his death.

== Kentucky Derby preparation ==
Sham and Linda's Chief, who were campaigning at Santa Anita Park, were considered the principal candidates from the West to contest 1972 Two Year Old champion and Horse of the Year Secretariat for the 1973 Kentucky Derby. On February 17, Sham earned his fourth consecutive win and first stakes win in the Santa Catalina Stakes at 1 1/16 miles. On March 1, Linda's Chief, trained by Robert Frankel, had established himself credibly with a track-record time of 1:33 4/5 in winning the mile San Jacinto Stakes. These two met for the first time March 17 in the 1 1/16 mile San Felipe Handicap, with Linda's Chief taking the win and Sham, the slight favorite, finishing fourth.

The two met again two weeks later March 31 in the 1 1/8 mile Santa Anita Derby. Linda's Chief, with Braulio Baeza up, was assigned post 5 and was sent off the 1:2 favorite. The Frank Martin entry of Sham, ridden by Laffit Pincay Jr., and the lesser regarded stablemate, California Juvenile stakes winner Knightly Dawn, was the post-time 5:2 second choice. Jorge Tejeira, a leading rider at the time, had originally been assigned the mount on Knightly Dawn, but on the morning of the race Tejeira was removed and Ismael Valenzuela, years past his top form as a highly regarded jockey (including regular rider of Kelso), was assigned the mount. The start was good, but Knightly Dawn, from post 6, angled in and sawed off Linda's Chief 40 yards after leaving the gate. Linda's Chief, a typical pacesetter, was 4 lengths back going into the first turn. Sham won the race, equaling the stakes record of 1:47 established in 1965 by Lucky Debonair, with Linda's Chief in second place 2 1/2 lengths back. Baeza filed a claim of foul with the stewards over the start. The stewards ruled there would be no change in the order of finish. (Ancient Title came out of his box and hit Linda's Chief.) This was Linda's Chief's last encounter with Sham, with Linda's Chief going on to win the California Derby, while Sham went to the Wood Memorial Stakes in New York.

The Wood Memorial, contested April 21 as the final New York prep to the Kentucky Derby, established Sham as a formidable rival to Secretariat. Although Secretariat's stable mate Angle Light set the pace and won, Sham lost by just a head and outfinished Secretariat by 4 lengths. Secretariat and Sham, at odds of 3:2 and 5:2, respectively, clearly established themselves as the betting favorite and second choice for the Kentucky Derby to be contested May 5, the first Saturday of May.

== 1973 Triple Crown chase ==
=== Kentucky Derby (May 5) ===
Before 134,476 fans, the largest crowd to see a horse race in the United States to that date, Sham ripped two teeth out on the starting gate at the Kentucky Derby. Although bleeding from the start, Sham finished second behind Secretariat, who came away with a 2 1/2 length victory running 1:59 2/5 for the 1 1/4 miles, the first horse to break two minutes in the Kentucky Derby. (The previous record was 2:00, set by Northern Dancer in 1964.) When asked about the effect of Sham's start, Laffit Pincay said, "It's difficult to see how he could have run much better than almost 1:59 4/5, and yet, logically, hitting his head on the gate and losing the teeth couldn't have helped him." By running 2 1/2 lengths behind Secretariat, Sham ran the distance in either 1:59 4/5 to 2:00 1/5. As races were not timed to 1/100 of a second at the time, and non-winning times were not taken, no exact time is available.

Considering the terminal velocity of the horses and the distance between them in lengths, Phil Dandrea estimates the gap between Secretariat and Sham at 0.348 seconds. This is confirmed by the CBS footage of the race in which Sham crosses the finish line 10 frames behind Secretariat. At a rate of 29.97 frames per second, this translates into a 0.34 second gap between the two horses at the wire. As, by definition, Secretariat's official winning time of 1:59 2/5 is the equivalent of a time between 1:59.40 and 1:59.59 with 1/100 precision, Sham's time can be estimated between 1:59.74 and 1:59.93, making him the second fastest horse in Kentucky Derby history.

It wasn't until 2001 that another horse won the Derby with a time under two minutes. Monarchos won it in 2001 in an electronically timed 1:59.97, which is by convention converted to 1:59 4/5. No other horse, through the 2023 running of the Kentucky Derby, has ever been below two minutes.

Sham's individual time of :23 3/5 in the closing quarter-mile of the race puts him into company with an elite group of horses that closed under 24 seconds: Whirlaway, the 1941 Triple Crown Winner, whose closing time of :23 2/5 stood for 32 years; and Secretariat, who closed it in :23.

=== Preakness Stakes (May 19) ===
With a Maryland racing record audience of 61,653 looking on, Secretariat defeated Sham for the second time in two weeks in the 98th running of the Grade 1 Preakness Stakes. In a field of six horses, Sham again finished second to Secretariat by 2 1/2 lengths. Before the race, Sham was given only bottled water to drink. Sham's time of 1:53 3/5 is tied for the fifth fastest in Preakness history.

=== Belmont Stakes (June 9) ===
Sham was uncharacteristically nervous before the Belmont Stakes and was sweating heavily during the post parade on the hot and humid afternoon in New York. Under orders from Martin, Pincay was to keep Sham with Secretariat from the start. This strategy worked through the first turn and into the backstretch as Secretariat and Sham led the field and then pulled away by a half-dozen lengths with Sham taking brief leads at several points early in the race until Secretariat began to pull ahead.

Pushing a blistering race-record pace, the pair was approximately a dozen lengths ahead of the pack when Secretariat began to pull away, as track announcer Chic Anderson described, "like a tremendous machine." As Secretariat opened a yawning lead, Pincay eased Sham to the finish line. Sham ultimately fell back to last place as Secretariat pulled away to a win recorded at 31 lengths. The time of 2:24 flat remains a world record for 1 1/2 miles on a dirt track.

== Stud career ==
While Sham did not race again after the Belmont Stakes, he was not retired until July 1973. The cause was a hairline fracture in the front right cannon bone that he sustained during training, which was surgically repaired with three screws. "Sham broke a cannon bone," trainer Frank Martin said. "I knew when he ran so bad, I knew something was wrong with him," and with that his racing career officially ended. Sham was first sent to stud duty at Spendthrift Farm and later to Walmac International near Lexington, Kentucky. His progeny included stakes winners Arewehavingfunyet (f), Jaazeiro, and Safe Play, the dam of stakes winner Defensive Play.

Sham died of a heart attack on April 3, 1993, at age 23. At the necropsy, his heart weighed in at 18 pounds (8.2 kg), about twice the weight of the average thoroughbred heart. He is buried at Walmac Farm.

== See also ==
- List of racehorses
