= Angle Light =

American-bred Thoroughbred racehorse

- Sire: Quadrangle
- Grandsire: Cohoes
- Dam: Pilot Light
- Damsire: Jet Action
- Sex: Stallion
- Foaled: 1970
- Country: United States
- Colour: Bay
- Breeder: Howard B. Noonan & Runnymede Farm
- Owner: Edwin Whittaker
- Trainer: Lucien Laurin
- Record: 21: 4-4-3
- Earnings: US$194,986

Major wins
- Wood Memorial Stakes (1973)

Angle Light (April 18, 1970 – unknown) was an American Thoroughbred racehorse who defeated the champion Secretariat in the 1973 Wood Memorial Stakes.

== Background ==
Angle Light was bred by Howard B. Noonan and Runnymede Farm and was purchased and raced by Edwin Whittaker. He was sired by 1964 Belmont Stakes winner Quadrangle, out of the mare Pilot Light. He was trained by future U.S. Racing Hall of Fame inductee Lucien Laurin.

== Racing career ==
Angle Light remains best known for winning the April 21, 1973, Wood Memorial Stakes at Aqueduct Racetrack in Ozone Park, Queens, New York. Stablemate, Secretariat, the reigning American Champion Two-Year-Old Colt and early favorite to win that May's Kentucky Derby, entered the race as a better than even-money favorite. However, unknown to most race fans, Secretariat had contracted a minor illness in the weeks before the Wood; an abscess was found under his lip hours before the race. Angle Light, a true speed horse who never won a race without an early lead, ran wire-to-wire under Jacinto Vásquez, with Sham finishing second and Secretariat in third. Angle Light finished tenth in the ensuing Kentucky Derby won by Secretariat.

== Retirement ==
Angle Light retired from racing with a record of 4-4-3 in 21 starts and earned $194,986. He is the only horse to defeat both Secretariat and Sham in the same race.

After his retirement from racing, Angle Light stood as a stallion at Blue Ridge Farm in Virginia. He died at Flag's Up Farm.

== Sources ==
- Nack, William. Secretariat: The Making of a Champion (2002) Da Capo Press ISBN 978-0-306-81133-3
- Angle Light's pedigree and partial racing stats
- Information on Angle Light at Runnymede Farm
- Video at YouTube of Angle Light winning the 1973 Wood Memorial Stakes
