= Penny Chenery =

American racehorse owner and breeder (1922–2017)

- Born: Helen Bates Chenery; January 27, 1922; New Rochelle, New York, U.S.
- Died: September 16, 2017 (aged 95); Boulder, Colorado, U.S.
- Education: Smith College (BA); Columbia University
- Occupations: Racehorse owner Breeder
- Known for: Secretariat; Riva Ridge
- Board member of: Thoroughbred Owners and Breeders Association
- Spouse(s): John Bayard Tweedy (m. 1949, divorced 1974) Lennart Ringquist (m. 1975, divorced 1980)
- Children: 4
- Parent: Christopher Chenery
- Relatives: Hollis B. Chenery (brother); Margaret Emily Chenery Carmichael (sister)
- Honors: The Arlington Park Penny Chenery Distinguished Woman in Racing Award; Eclipse Award of Merit (2006); Smith College Medal (2009); U.S. Racing Hall of Fame: Pillars of the Turf (2018)

Helen Bates "Penny" Chenery (January 27, 1922 – September 16, 2017) (married names: Penny Tweedy until 1974 and later Penny Ringquist until 1980) was an American sportswoman who bred and owned Secretariat, the 1973 winner of the Triple Crown. The youngest of three children, she graduated from The Madeira School in 1939 and earned a Bachelor of Arts from Smith College, then studied at the Columbia Business School, where she met her future husband, John Tweedy, Sr., a Columbia Law School graduate. In March 2011, Randolph-Macon College in Ashland, Virginia, awarded Chenery an Honorary Doctor of Laws degree.

== Early life ==
Penny Chenery was born in 1922 in New Rochelle, New York, and was raised in Pelham Manor, New York. The youngest of three children, she was named Helen Bates Chenery after her mother. Her father, Christopher Chenery, a Virginian, was driven by early poverty to become a millionaire, a goal he accomplished by 1928 by founding utility companies, first Federal Water Service, and then Southern Natural Gas Company. In 1936, he founded Meadow Stable, a thoroughbred racing and horse breeding operation at The Meadow in Caroline County, Virginia.

Chenery had a love of horses from a young age, and learned to ride at age five. Believing her appreciation for horses was inherited from her father, Chenery stated, "My father really loved horses. I think a parent often communicates his love to a child." She shared many of her father's interests and goals, including business. She attended the Madeira School in McLean, Virginia, a prestigious girls' boarding school with an equestrian program. Chenery was captain of the Equestrian Team in her senior year. Following her graduation, she attended Smith College in Northampton, Massachusetts, majoring in American Studies.

== Career ==
After graduating in 1943, Chenery worked as an assistant for Gibbs and Cox, a company that designed war craft for the Normandy invasion; subsequent to the invasion, she quit her job to join the Red Cross, at the urging of her brother. In 1945 she traveled to France as a Doughnut Girl to help war-weary soldiers transition to ships home at the end of World War II.

When Chenery returned from Europe in 1946, her father was concerned that she had no employable skills, so he offered to pay her the equivalent of the highest job offer she could get if she would go to graduate school instead. Chenery decided to attend Columbia Business School where she was one of 20 women in a class of 800 men. At Columbia, she met John (Jack) Bayard Tweedy. At her parents' suggestion, she dropped out of school a few months short of her MBA to marry Jack. They moved to Denver, Colorado, where he practiced oil and gas law. They had four children: Sarah, Kate, Christopher, and John Jr. The Tweedys spent much of their time in Vail, Colorado because Jack Tweedy was one of the former members of the 10th Mountain Division in World War II who founded Vail Ski Resort in the early 1960s. He was later Chairman of the Board of Vail Associates.

Chenery's life changed when her mother died suddenly and her father became ill in late 1967. He entered New Rochelle Hospital in April 1968 and remained there until his death in January 1973. Due to Mr. Chenery's advancing senility, Meadow Stable, the Chenery thoroughbred breeding and racing operation in Virginia, had been neglected in the mid-1960s and was no longer profitable. Chenery's siblings wanted to sell the operation since their father could no longer manage it. Chenery, however, hoped to fulfill her father's dream of winning the Kentucky Derby. The board of Meadow Stable elected her president and in 1968, she began the long process of cutting costs, repairing facilities and returning the stable to profitability. In 1969, she fired long-time trainer Casey Hayes. On the advice of longtime family friend and business associate Bull Hancock of Claiborne Farm, Chenery hired Roger Laurin to train and manage the Meadow Stable horses. With Laurin's help, the stable began to produce a few stakes winning horses in 1969 and 1970. However, in May 1971, Roger Laurin left the Meadow to train for the much vaunted Phipps family stables, so Chenery turned to his father, Lucien Laurin, as a temporary substitute. However, Laurin Sr. decided to stay on when the Meadow's homebred Riva Ridge brought in over $500,000 in purses in the fall of 1971. In May, 1972 Riva Ridge won the Kentucky Derby and in June Belmont Stakes, thus fulfilling Mr. Chenery's lifelong dream of producing a great horse. That same year, another Meadow colt, the two-year-old Secretariat had such a dominant fall season that he became American Horse of the Year which was a rare honor for a two-year-old. The following year, Secretariat captured the imagination of racing fans worldwide when he became the first Triple Crown winner in 25 years, setting records that still stand in all three races and winning the Belmont by an unheard-of 31 lengths. Both horses were inducted into the National Museum of Racing and Hall of Fame. When Chenery's father died in January 1973, his estate owed such a large tax bill that it could only be satisfied by syndicating the breeding rights to Secretariat and Riva Ridge to a consortium of breeders. Chenery made headlines by successfully syndicating Secretariat for $6.08 million and Riva Ridge for $5 million. Eventually the Meadow in Doswell, Virginia, also was sold to settle the estate. Chenery moved many of the remaining horses to Long Island, N.Y. and continued racing.

Although Penny Chenery gets the credit for managing Secretariat's racing career, Christopher Chenery was the genius behind the matching of Somethingroyal and Bold Ruler to produce Secretariat. In 1965 he set up the deal by which two Meadow mares would be bred annually to top sire Bold Ruler, owned by Ogden Phipps. Each year the owners would flip for the right to choose among the foals. The Meadow sent their best mare Somethingroyal to Bold Ruler several times and had already produced a stakes winner, Syrian Sea, a full sister to Secretariat. In 1969, Penny Chenery who by then managed Meadow Stable, lost the coin toss. This gave her the right to first choice of the foals in 1970, but that year there was only one foal: Secretariat.

After Secretariat, Chenery continued to breed and race horses under the Meadow silks with her greatest success coming in Saratoga Dew, who became the first New York-bred horse ever to win an Eclipse Award when the filly was voted the 1992 American Champion Three-Year-Old Filly.

== Accomplishments and accolades ==
In 1983, Chenery, Martha F. Gerry, and Allaire du Pont became the first women to be admitted as members of The Jockey Club. From 1976 to 1984, Chenery served as president of the Thoroughbred Owners and Breeders Association. Also in 1976, she became a member of the Executive Committee of the American Horse Council, the horse industry trade association in Washington, DC. She also served as a member of the judges' panel of the Jockey Club, which bestows the Dogwood Dominion Award. In addition, she helped found the Thoroughbred Retirement Foundation, an organization dedicated to saving Thoroughbred horses no longer able to compete on the racetrack from possible neglect, abuse and slaughter.

In 2003, the Arlington Park track established the annual "Penny Chenery Distinguished Woman in Racing Award". In 2006, the National Thoroughbred Racing Association honored her with the Eclipse Award of Merit for a lifetime of outstanding achievement in thoroughbred racing. In 2009, she was awarded the Smith College Medal for extraordinary professional achievement and outstanding service to her community.

In 2018, The National Museum of Racing and Hall of Fame named Ms. Chenery a Pillar of the Turf, the highest honor given to owners and breeders of Thoroughbreds.

== Personal life and death ==
Chenery moved from Colorado to Long Island, New York, in 1949. She and John Tweedy divorced in 1974. In 1976, she married Lennart Ringquist, an executive in the motion pictures industry, divorcing in 1980. She moved to Lexington, Kentucky in the early 1990s and in 2005 moved to Boulder, Colorado to spend her final years near her children.

Penny Chenery died on September 16, 2017, at her home in Boulder, Colorado from complications from a stroke. She was 95 years old.

== Depictions in media ==
Chenery was portrayed by actress Diane Lane in the 2010 motion picture Secretariat, released on October 8, 2010. Chenery herself appeared in a cameo role in the film as a spectator at the Belmont Stakes. She was the subject of several books and articles as well as the 2013 documentary Penny and Red (Landlocked Films) made by filmmaker John Tweedy.
