= Riva Ridge =

Thoroughbred race horse, winner of the 1972 Kentucky Derby and Belmont Stakes

- Sire: First Landing
- Grandsire: Turn-To
- Dam: Iberia
- Damsire: Heliopolis
- Sex: Stallion
- Foaled: April 13, 1969; The Meadow; Doswell, Virginia, U.S.
- Died: April 21, 1985 (aged 16); Claiborne Farm; Paris, Kentucky, U.S.
- Country: United States
- Colour: Bay
- Breeder: Meadow Stud, Inc.
- Owner: Meadow Stable
- Trainer: Lucien Laurin
- Record: 30:17-3-1
- Earnings: $1,111,347

Major wins
- Champagne Stakes (1971); Futurity Stakes (1971); Laurel Futurity (1971); Flash Stakes (1971); Garden State Futurity (1971); Hibiscus Stakes (1972); Blue Grass Stakes (1972); Hollywood Derby (1972); Brooklyn Handicap (1973); Massachusetts Handicap (1973); Stuyvesant Handicap (1973) Triple Crown races wins: Kentucky Derby (1972); Belmont Stakes (1972)

Awards
- U.S. Champion 2-Yr-Old (1971); U.S. Champion Older Horse (1973)

Honours
- United States Racing Hall of Fame (1998) #57 – Top 100 U.S. Racehorses of the 20th Century; Riva Ridge Stakes at Belmont Park
- Last updated on January 24, 2008

Riva Ridge (April 13, 1969 – April 21, 1985) was a Thoroughbred racehorse, the winner of the Kentucky Derby and Belmont Stakes in 1972.

Often remembered simply as a stablemate of Secretariat, Riva Ridge was a successful racehorse in his own right, winning 17 of his 30 starts and two championships: American Champion Two-Year-Old Male Horse in 1971 and American Champion Older Male Horse in 1973. Contrary to popular belief, Riva Ridge's success was largely responsible for saving Meadow Stable from financial ruin.

== Background ==
Riva Ridge was a light bay stallion who stood 16 hands high. A son of First Landing out of Iberia (by Heliopolis), Riva Ridge is related to Man o’ War through his dam (mother), Iberia. Riva Ridge and his sire were owned and bred by the Meadow Stable of Christopher Chenery in Doswell, Virginia. Secretariat, the Triple Crown champion in 1973, was owned and bred by the same stable.

Riva Ridge's name came from Chenery's daughter Penny and her husband, John Tweedy, honoring their favorite ski run at Vail, Colorado. Tweedy had trained with the U.S. Army's Tenth Mountain Division in Colorado in 1943, but later served in Burma with the OSS. Upon his return from the war, he and fellow veterans from the Tenth Mountain division founded Vail Ski Resort in Colorado in 1962. They named the longest run "Riva Ridge" after a costly but important strategic victory by the U.S. Army's 10th Mountain Division on February 18 in the North Apennine mountains of Italy.

In 1971, Meadow Stable was struggling financially. Christopher Chenery was very ill, and Penny wanted to save the operation, at odds with her siblings Hollis and Margaret, who wanted to sell it. Following Riva Ridge's success as a two-year-old, however, Hollis and Margaret stopped pushing for her to sell the farm.

A winner of the Eclipse Award at age two and four, Riva Ridge was ridden mainly by Hall of Fame jockey Ron Turcotte, who also rode stablemate Secretariat a year later. He was trained by Lucien Laurin.

Riva Ridge was described by Penny Chenery as a very timid and unassuming horse who "ran to get away from [other horses]." He was nicknamed "Old Pea Head" while racing.

== Racing career ==
=== 1971: two-year-old season ===
Riva Ridge made his racetrack debut on June 9, 1971, at Belmont Park. Despite going off at 2-1 odds, Riva Ridge was bumped at the start and finished seventh. With blinkers added, he then won in both maiden and allowance company, having broken on the lead in both races. In his stakes debut in the Great American Stakes, he again disappointed as the favorite, finishing eighth.

For his next start in the Flash Stakes at Saratoga Race Course, Riva Ridge benefited from a jockey change to Ron Turcotte. Turcotte guided Riva Ridge back to the rail after he tried to bolt to the outside following the break, resulting in a 2 1/2 length victory. Because of Riva Ridge's behavior in the Flash Stakes, Turcotte realized that Riva Ridge had a fear of close quarters caused by the difficult start in his first race. He asked trainer Lucien Laurin if Riva Ridge could take a month away from racing to work on overcoming his fear. Laurin had plans for Riva Ridge to run in other races at Saratoga, so he initially declined Turcotte's request. Turcotte insisted that that month would make a huge difference in Riva Ridge's future career, telling Laurin "you can have a champion or a claimer. It’s your call." Following this, Laurin agreed to allow Turcotte to work Riva Ridge in company, using stable ponies at first and then two other horses from Laurin's barn. Laurin planned to run Riva Ridge in the Hopeful Stakes after Turcotte was finished working with him, but the horse came down with a fever a few hours before the race and had to be scratched. Ultimately, Turcotte's idea worked, and Riva Ridge won four consecutive stakes in the fall of 1971, netting him honors as that year's two-year-old champion.

=== 1972: three-year-old season ===
In early 1972, Laurin announced that Riva Ridge would only run in three races prior to the Kentucky Derby, which shocked many observers. In his three-year-old debut, Riva Ridge won the Hibiscus Stakes at Hialeah Park Race Track. He then ran in the Everglades Stakes, but he did not take well to the sloppy track and finished fourth. He then came back and won the Blue Grass Stakes in his final prep race nine days before the Kentucky Derby.

The morning of the Kentucky Derby, Turcotte asked Laurin if he could cut larger holes in Riva Ridge's blinkers because it would help the horse should he need to go to the front early in the race. While Laurin thought it was too late to make changes, he allowed Turcotte to alter the blinkers as long as it wouldn't hurt the horse's chances. In the Derby, the other jockeys held their horses back early on, as Turcotte expected, and Riva Ridge took the lead early, holding it throughout the race to win by 3 1/4 lengths.

After his win as the 9-5 favorite at the Kentucky Derby, many expected Riva Ridge to win the Triple Crown. Although a 1-5 odds-on favorite at Pimlico in Baltimore, he finished fourth to longshot Bee Bee Bee, after rain made the going sloppy. Turcotte later said that Riva Ridge "would never feel secure on an off track," indicating the track condition likely factored into the loss. In the 1 1/2-mile (2.4 km) Belmont Stakes, Riva Ridge defeated nine other horses with a seven-length victory.

Later in his three-year-old season, Riva Ridge won the Hollywood Derby by a nose, but then suffered five straight losses, two of which were to eventual champion three-year-old male Key to the Mint. After freshening up and training well in July, Riva Ridge's first race following the Hollywood Derby was the Monmouth Invitational. Before his fourth-place finish, Laurin and Penny Chenery thought he was unusually docile in the saddling paddock and Turcotte described him as having been "dull" in the post parade. When Riva Ridge returned to Saratoga the day after, he tested positive for traces of a tranquilizer derivative, indicating someone had likely given him a tranquilizer between 8 and 48 hours before the race. However, Riva Ridge was not tested immediately after the race by officials and the levels reported were not grounds for any action regardless. Riva Ridge then lost the Stymie Handicap by a neck to Canonero II, winner of 1971's Kentucky Derby and Preakness Stakes, and was off the board in his final three starts, all over off tracks or turf. Riva Ridge is one of five horses who won two of three Triple Crown races but not that year's three-year-old championship.

=== 1973: four-year-old season ===
At age four, Riva Ridge developed a kidney condition and a chronic shoulder issue, but still won five of the nine races he entered, set track records four times, and equaled the 1 1/8-mile track record at Suffolk Downs in winning the Massachusetts Handicap. His winning time of 1:52 2/5 in the Brooklyn Handicap (raced that year at Aqueduct Racetrack) set a world record for 1 3/16 miles on the dirt. His mark was equaled by Farma Way in 1991 at Pimlico Race Course. As of January 2008, their record still stands.

With much fanfare, the Philip Morris company (manufacturer of Marlboro cigarettes) sponsored what was to be a match race with stablemate Secretariat. After both horses were beaten in preparatory races for the match, it was changed to an invitational race, the Marlboro Cup, which brought together top horses three years old and up. In record time, Secretariat (ridden by Turcotte) finished first and Riva Ridge (ridden by Eddie Maple) finished second. Both horses surpassed the world record time for 1 1/8 miles on dirt, though only Secretariat received credit due to his first-place finish. During their careers, both horses wore the blue and white checks of Meadow Stable. In 30 lifetime starts, Riva Ridge won 17 races, finished second three times and third once, with earnings of $1,111,497.

== Stud career ==
After the death of Christopher Chenery in January 1973, Riva Ridge and his stablemate Secretariat were both sold to breeding syndicates and retired to stud at Claiborne Farm at the end of the 1973 racing season. Riva Ridge was syndicated for $5.12 million, and Secretariat for $6.08 million. Penny Chenery often came back to visit both horses, but over time Secretariat would no longer acknowledge her due to the many visitors he got. Riva Ridge, however, developed a stronger bond with Penny since he was largely overlooked by the general public. "There was never a time when Riva wouldn’t come up to me to say hello," she later said in an interview.

After they were retired to stud at Claiborne Farm, Somethingroyal was bred in 1975 to her former stablemate Riva Ridge which produced Straight Flush, one of her most important foals besides his half-brother, Secretariat, and his sire Riva Ridge.

Out of Riva Ridge's 360 named foals, 228 were winners, including 29 stakes winners.

Riva Ridge died of a heart attack in his paddock on April 21, 1985, after a trip to the breeding shed. Claiborne staff saw him fall over in his paddock and immediately rushed over to him, but he had died by the time he hit the ground. He was 16 years old.

== Assessment ==
In the Top 100 U.S. Thoroughbred Champions of the 20th century, Riva Ridge was ranked No. 57. He was elected to the American Racing Hall of Fame in 1998.

== Pedigree ==
Pedigree of Riva Ridge
Sire First Landing	Turn-To	Royal Charger	Nearco
Sire First Landing	Turn-To	Royal Charger	Sun Princess
Sire First Landing	Turn-To	Source Sucree	Admiral Drake
Sire First Landing	Turn-To	Source Sucree	Lavendula
Sire First Landing	Hildene	Bubbling Over	North Star
Sire First Landing	Hildene	Bubbling Over	Beaming Beauty
Sire First Landing	Hildene	Fancy Racket	Wrack
Sire First Landing	Hildene	Fancy Racket	Ultimate Fancy
Dam Iberia	Heliopolis	Hyperion	Gainsborough
Dam Iberia	Heliopolis	Hyperion	Selene
Dam Iberia	Heliopolis	Drift	Swynford
Dam Iberia	Heliopolis	Drift	Santa Cruz
Dam Iberia	War East	Easton	Dark Legend
Dam Iberia	War East	Easton	Phaona
Dam Iberia	War East	Warrior Lass	Man o' War
Dam Iberia	War East	Warrior Lass	Sweetheart

== See also ==
- Meadow Stable
- Penny Chenery
- Secretariat (horse)
- Riva Ridge Operation
- Vail Ski Resort longest run
