= Horse length =

Unit of measurement for the length of a horse from nose to tail; approximately 240 cm

A horse length, or simply length, is a unit of measurement for the length of a horse from nose to tail, approximately 8 feet (2.4 m).

== Use in horse racing ==
The length is commonly used in Thoroughbred horse racing, where it describes the distance between horses in a race. Horses may be described as winning by several lengths, as in the notable example of Secretariat, who won the 1973 Belmont Stakes by 31 lengths. In 2013, the New York Racing Association placed a blue-and-white checkered pole at Belmont Park to mark that winning margin; using Equibase's official measurement of a length—8 feet 2 inches (2.49 m)—the pole was placed 253 feet 2 inches (77.17 m) from the finish line.

More often, winning distances are merely a fraction of a length, such as half a length. In British horse racing, the distances between horses are calculated by converting the time between them into lengths by a scale of lengths-per-second. The actual number of lengths-per-second varies according to the type of race and the going conditions. For example, in a flat turf race run on good going, a value of six lengths-per-second is used; in a national hunt race on heavy going, where horses are assumed to be moving more slowly, the value is four lengths-per-second.

== Other measures ==
Distances smaller than that are similarly described in reference to the equine body with terms such as a "neck", and a "head", a "short head" or "nose", the smallest possible named advantage by which a horse can win. In Ireland a margin of more than 30 lengths is described as a "distance". In the United Kingdom, the maximum recognised distance is 99 lengths, with anything over this being referred to as "99+ lengths". In France the term "short neck" is used for a margin intermediate between a head and a neck. Harness race finishing margins are typically measured in meters.

== Other uses ==
These terms are used in other disciplines of equestrianism as well. It is particularly useful as a guide for riders in spacing animals apart when a number of them are all together in a riding arena such as during group riding instruction or at a horse show.

== Abbreviations ==
In reporting result of horse races winning margins are commonly abbreviated:

United States Abbreviations
Margin	Abbreviation
Nose	ns
Head	hd
Neck	nk
Half a length	1/2
Three quarters of a length	3/4

European Abbreviations
Margin	Abbreviation
Nose	nse
Short head	sh
Head	hd
Short neck	snk
Neck	nk
Half a length	½L
Three-quarters of a length	¾L
One length	1L
Distance	dst

== See also ==
- Glossary of equestrian terms
- Glossary of Australian and New Zealand punting (horse-racing terms)
- List of unusual units of measurement
- Glossary of North American horse racing
