= Lucien Laurin =

Canadian horse trainer (1912–2000)

Personal information
- Born: March 18, 1912 Joliette, Quebec, Canada
- Died: June 26, 2000 (aged 88) Miami, Florida, United States
- Occupation: Jockey / Trainer

Horse racing career
- Sport: Horse racing
- Career wins: 1,161

Major racing wins
- Matron Stakes (1958); Gardenia Stakes (1958); Youthful Stakes (1958, 1966); Acorn Stakes (1959); Mother Goose Stakes (1959); Delaware Handicap (1960); Saratoga Special Stakes (1960); Sheepshead Bay Handicap (1960); Hopeful Stakes (1963, 1972); Philip H. Iselin Handicap (1965); Queens County Handicap (1966); Wood Memorial Stakes (1966, 1969, 1972, 1973); Carter Handicap (1967); Gravesend Handicap (1967); Breeders' Futurity Stakes (1968); Gotham Stakes (1969, 1973); National Stallion Stakes (1969); Belmont Futurity Stakes (1971, 1972); Champagne Stakes (1971); Laurel Futurity Stakes (1971, 1972); Blue Grass Stakes (1972); Florida Derby (1972); Hollywood Derby (1972); Sanford Stakes (1972); Man o' War Stakes (1973); Brooklyn Handicap (1973); Canadian International Stakes (1973); Marlboro Cup Invitational Handicap (1973); Maskette Stakes (1976) American Classic Race wins: Kentucky Derby (1972, 1973); Preakness Stakes (1973); Belmont Stakes (1966, 1972, 1973)

Racing awards
- Eclipse Award for Outstanding Trainer (1972); United States Triple Crown (1973)

Honours
- United States Racing Hall of Fame (1977); Canadian Horse Racing Hall of Fame (1978)

Significant horses
- Amberoid, Angle Light, Quill, Riva Ridge, Secretariat

Lucien Laurin (March 18, 1912 – June 26, 2000) was a Canadian jockey and Hall of Fame Thoroughbred horse trainer. He was best known for training Secretariat, who won the Triple Crown in 1973.

== Life and career ==
Laurin was born in Joliette, Quebec. His career in Thoroughbred horse racing began in 1929 as a jockey at Blue Bonnets Raceway in Montreal, Quebec. Battling weight problems, after riding 161 race winners, in 1942 he began working as a trainer in New England, a job that would span 45 years and take him to the pinnacle of horse racing success. While working for two different stables, he enjoyed a long and successful association with owner Reginald N. Webster. For Webster, Laurin trained a number of winners including Quill, the 1958 American Champion Two-Year-Old Filly, and Amberoid, who won the 1966 Wood Memorial Stakes and gave Laurin his first of six American Classics, the Belmont Stakes.

His son, Roger Laurin, worked as a trainer at Christopher Chenery's Meadow Stable and when Roger accepted an offer to work for Ogden Phipps, he suggested to Penny Chenery Tweedy that his father might help them on a temporary basis. Coming out of retirement in 1971, Lucien Laurin went to work at the Meadow Stable for what was supposed to be a temporary period. At that time, the stable was having financial difficulties but things soon changed. With their colt, Riva Ridge, earning more than $500,000 and being named American Champion Two-Year-Old Colt for 1971, Lucien Laurin and the Meadow Stable would soon become the number one stable in racing, winning numerous important Stakes races and five of the six U.S. Triple Crown races in 1972–73.

Under Lucien Laurin, Riva Ridge, with fellow Canadian jockey Ron Turcotte in the saddle, won the 1972 Kentucky Derby and the Belmont Stakes. A heavy rainstorm muddied the track at Pimlico Race Course; otherwise the horse might have won the Triple Crown. For 1972, Lucien Laurin was named the National Thoroughbred Racing Association's Eclipse Award winner as North America's most outstanding trainer. However, despite this success, Laurin is best known as the trainer of Secretariat who was voted the 1972 American Champion Two-Year-Old Colt, and the 1972 and 1973 American Horse of the Year and who, in 1973, became the first Triple Crown winner in twenty-five years and the horse ranked #2 in the Blood-Horse magazine List of the Top 100 U.S. Racehorses of the 20th Century.

Lucien Laurin retired from racing a second time in 1976, but returned in 1983 as trainer and part owner of Evergreen Stable. In all, he trained a total of 36 stakes winners and was inducted in the National Museum of Racing and Hall of Fame in 1977 and enshrined in the Canadian Horse Racing Hall of Fame the following year.

== Death ==
Laurin was living at his home in Key Largo, Florida, when he died in 2000 at a Miami hospital.

== Popular culture ==
In the 2010 Disney film Secretariat, Laurin was portrayed by John Malkovich.
