= Sigmund Sommer =

Building contractor and racehorse owner

- Born: June 19, 1916; Brooklyn, New York, US
- Died: April 30, 1979 (aged 62); Ozone Park, Queens, New York, US
- Occupations: Real estate developer, building contractor, philanthropist, racehorse owner
- Known for: Sham
- Spouse: Viola Landsberg (1921–2009)
- Children: 3

Sigmund Sommer (June 19, 1916 – April 30, 1979) was a Brooklyn, New York–based building contractor, philanthropist, and racehorse owner of Sham, the horse that placed second to Secretariat in two legs of the 1973 U.S. Triple Crown series. At the time of Sommer's death at 62 in 1979, his estate was valued at almost $1 billion.

== Biography ==
Sigmund Sommer came from a family that had dealt in real estate since 1885. He built up his real estate business in the 1930s and 1940s by building small apartment buildings in Brooklyn and single family homes in northern New Jersey. By the 1970s, Sommer had expanded his real estate holdings to include shopping malls and commercial and residential properties in and around the metropolitan New York City area. These properties included 45 East 66th Street.

== Thoroughbred racehorse owner ==
In the 1960s, Sommer purchased his first race horse, and along with his wife, Viola, oversaw one of the most successful thoroughbred racing stables through the 70s. The stable was among the leading money earners for ten consecutive years, earning over $1.5 million in 1971, a record, and beating that amount in 1972. At the time the Sommers owned 40 horses who ran under the stable's green and gold colors.

With U.S. Racing Hall of Fame trainer Frank "Pancho" Martin, Sommer enjoyed considerable success that included winning the Display Handicap five times (1970, 1971, 1972, 1973, 1978).

== Horse racing ==
Sham, the Sommer stable's most famous horse, purchased from Claiborne Farm after the death of Arthur B. Hancock, Jr. in 1972, and trained by Pancho Martin, holds the unofficial record for the second-fastest time in the Kentucky Derby when he placed second to Secretariat, clocking in unofficially in 1:59 4/5. In 1982, Viola Sommer won the Eclipse Award for Outstanding Owner. Sommer, who frequented the racetracks daily, died of a heart attack while at the Aqueduct Racetrack. He was survived by his wife Viola Sommer and three children: Jack Sommer, Susan Sommer Schweitzman, and Dr. Barbara Sommer Fisher.
