= Christopher Chenery =

American businessman and racehorse owner (1886–1973)

- Born: Christopher Tompkins Chenery; September 19, 1886; Richmond, Virginia, U.S.
- Died: January 3, 1973 (aged 86); New Rochelle, New York, U.S.
- Education: Randolph-Macon College; Washington and Lee University (BS)
- Occupations: Businessman: Engineering; Racehorse owner/breeder
- Known for: Owner of Secretariat
- Spouse: Helen Bates
- Children: Margaret Chenery Carmichael; Hollis B. Chenery; Penny Chenery
- Honors: Eclipse Award for Outstanding Breeder (1972, 1973); Virginia Thoroughbred Association Hall of Fame (1987); Virginia Sports Hall of Fame (1985); United States Racing Hall of Fame, Pillar of the Turf (2019)

Christopher Chenery (September 16, 1886 – January 3, 1973) was an American engineer, businessman, and owner/breeder of the thoroughbred racehorse Secretariat, a U.S. Triple Crown champion.

== Early life and career ==
Christopher Chenery, the son of Ida and James Chenery, was born in Richmond and raised in Ashland, Virginia. He had three brothers, William Ludlow Chenery, who became editor of Collier's, Dr. Alan Chenery, and Charles Morris Chenery. (A fourth brother died young.) Chenery's sister was Blanche Chenery Perrin, a writer of novels and children's books centered on horse racing, such as Born To Race. As a child, Chenery visited relatives at the farm in Doswell, Virginia known as The Meadow where he learned to ride. This was the farm where he later founded Meadow Stable and where Secretariat was born.

He studied at Randolph-Macon College and Washington and Lee University, graduating in 1909 with a Bachelor of Science in Engineering. He began his engineering career in Virginia before moving to projects in the Pacific Northwest and Alaska, but his career was interrupted with service in the United States Army Corps of Engineers during World War I. During the war, he commanded training facilities at Camp Humphries, Virginia. Afterward, he was a government consultant on engineering and construction.

On January 18, 1917, he married Helen Clementina Bates, who died in November 1967. They had two daughters, Helen Bates "Penny" Tweedy and Margaret Carmichael, and one son, Hollis Burnley Chenery, an economist at the World Bank.

Chenery formed the Federal Water Service Corporation in 1926, later the Federal Water and Gas Corporation. Chenery was involved in two cases before the Supreme Court of the United States (both entitled Securities and Exchange Commission v. Chenery Corp., one decided in 1943 and one in 1947), and that are considered landmark cases of United States administrative law. In 1936, he became the chairman of the board of another utility, Southern Natural Gas later Sonat, eventually purchased by the El Paso Corp. In 1954 he formed The Offshore Company, a Southern Natural Gas Company subsidiary conducting deepwater drilling in the Gulf of Mexico. He was chairman of the board and chief executive officer until 1965.

== Meadow Stable ==
Racing colors of Meadow Stable

One of the founders of the New York Racing Association, Chenery made his home in the village of Pelham Manor, New York, for nearly fifty years from the early 1920s until his hospitalization in 1968, five years before his death. He was an active member of the community, including serving on the vestry of Christ Church, the Protestant Episcopal Church in Pelham. However, he is best known for his 1936 purchase of The Meadow, an ancestral property in Caroline County near his boyhood home in Ashland, Virginia. It was there that he founded Meadow Stud, a stud farm which bred thoroughbreds, and Meadow Stable, under whose colors the horses ran. According to Alan Chenery Jr., Christopher's nephew, the Chenery brothers decided that the horses from Meadow Stable would wear the blue and white colors of their college fraternity, Phi Delta Theta.

Chenery bought "four or five horses for a moderate price" in 1936, and soon afterward "a good 16-year-old horse named Whiskaway for $115". In 1939, he purchased his foundation mare, Hildene, for $750. Hildene would produce two of Chenery's most important horses: Hill Prince, the 1950 American Horse of the Year, and First Landing, champion juvenile in 1958 and third in the 1959 Kentucky Derby. He also owned Cicada, champion filly at two, three, and four and once the world's leading money winner among mares.

In 1947 Chenery purchased a stakes-winning mare named Imperatrice at a dispersal sale for $30,000. She would go on to produce several stakes winners for The Meadow, but her most important offspring was Somethingroyal, an unplaced mare who became the 1973 Kentucky Broodmare of the Year. Prior to foaling Secretariat at age 18, Somethingroyal had already produced Sir Gaylord, a stakes winner who became an important sire, whose offspring included Epsom Derby winner Sir Ivor. Somethingroyal's other stakes winners included First Family and Syrian Sea.

In the mid-1950s Chenery was one of three men appointed by the Jockey Club to restructure and restore integrity to New York racing. Along with John W. Hanes and Harry Guggenheim, Chenery organized the non-profit Greater New York Racing Authority, with the novel idea of funneling proceeds to the state. However, it was Chenery who personally obtained the $30 million loan necessary to renovate New York race tracks after banks balked at financing "an enterprise based on gambling".

In 1965 Chenery entered a foal-sharing agreement with Ogden Phipps, who owned a leading sire, Bold Ruler. Each year, they would breed two Meadow broodmares with Bold Ruler. Then, before the foals were born, they would decide by coin toss who got first choice of the two foals. In 1968, Chenery became ill, and his daughter Penny took charge of The Meadow. She chose Somethingroyal as one of the mares for breeding to Bold Ruler. In 1969, Tweedy lost the coin toss with Phipps, who chose the other mare's foal. The Meadow kept Somethingroyal's yet-to-be-born foal, the future Secretariat.

Chenery was admitted to New Rochelle Hospital in late February 1968. He remained there until his death on January 3, 1973, before Secretariat's Triple Crown victory occurred.

Now known as Meadow Event Park, the former farm became the home of the Virginia State Fair in 2009.

== Honors ==
Christopher Chenery was recognized by the American horse racing industry with a number of laurels including the Eclipse Award for Outstanding Breeder in 1972 and 1973. In 2019 he received its highest honor when the National Museum of Racing and Hall of Fame made him one of the Pillars of the Turf.
