= Ron Turcotte =

Canadian thoroughbred jockey (1941–2025)

Ron Turcotte CM ONB
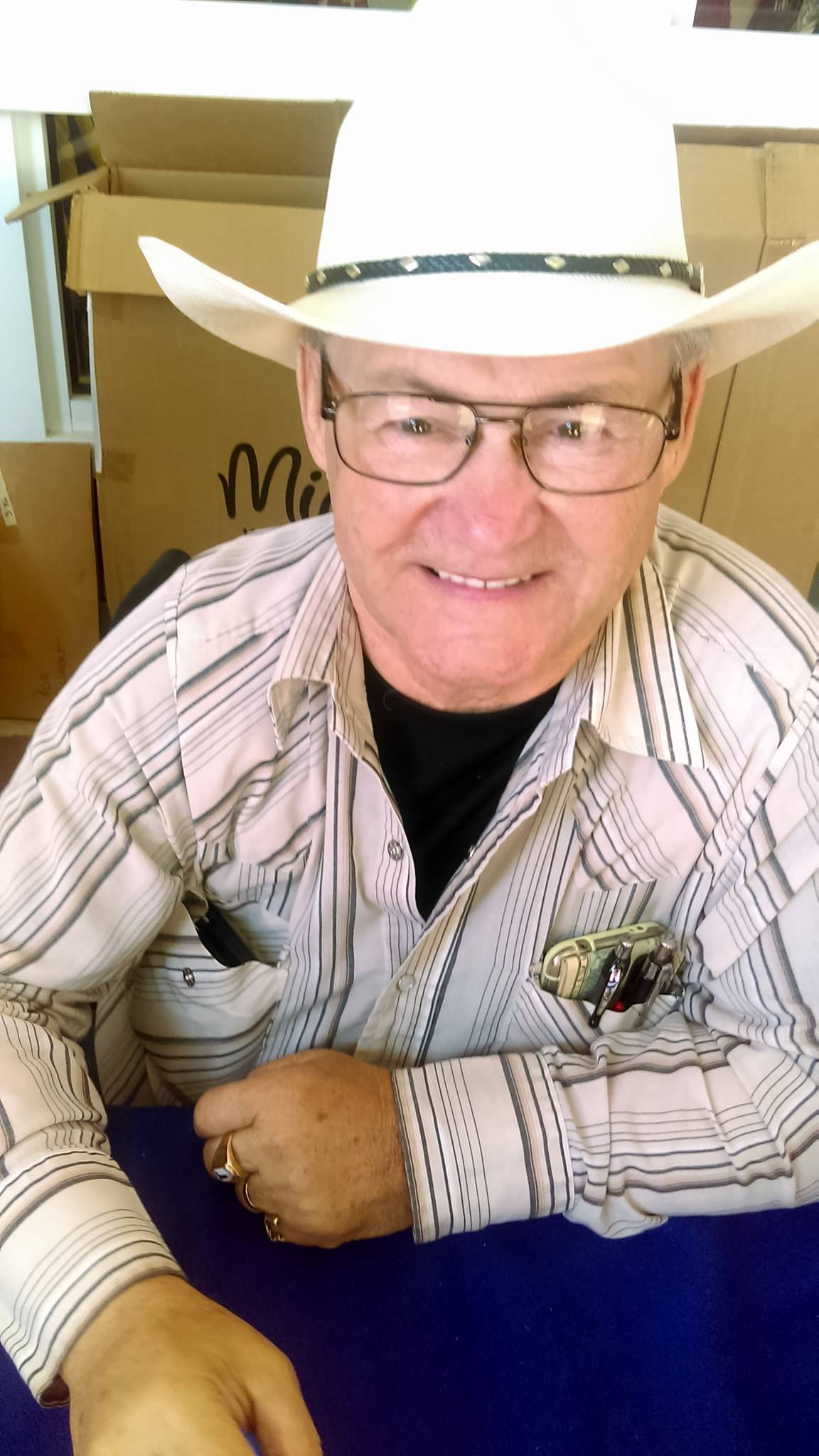
- Turcotte in 2017

Personal information
- Born: July 22, 1941 Drummond, New Brunswick, Canada
- Died: August 22, 2025 (aged 84) Drummond, New Brunswick, Canada
- Occupation: Jockey

Horse racing career
- Sport: Horse racing
- Career wins: 3,032

Major racing wins
- Breeders' Stakes (1962); Coronation Futurity Stakes (1963); Toronto Autumn Cup (1963); Canadian International Stakes (1964, 1971); Lexington Handicap (1964, 1974); Kentucky Oaks (1965); Sport Page Handicap (1966); Palm Beach Handicap (1966, 1967, 1969, 1970); Suburban Handicap (1966); Bernard Baruch Handicap (1967); Tremont Stakes (1967); National Stallion Stakes (1968); Bahamas Stakes (1969); Beldame Stakes (1970); Diana Handicap (1970, 1971, 1976); Hawthorne Gold Cup Handicap (1970, 1979); Jockey Club Gold Cup (1970); Withers Stakes (1970); Alabama Stakes (1971); Flash Stakes (1971); Belmont Futurity Stakes (1971, 1972); Champagne Stakes (1971); Gotham Stakes (1971, 1973); Laurel Futurity (1971, 1972); Blue Grass Stakes (1972); Coaching Club American Oaks (1972); Florida Derby (1972); Great American Stakes (1972); Hopeful Stakes (1972); Hollywood Derby (1972); Manhattan Handicap (1972); Monmouth Oaks (1972); Sanford Stakes (1972); Wood Memorial Stakes (1972); Brooklyn Handicap (1973); Excelsior Breeders' Cup Handicap (1973); Man O' War Stakes (1973, 1974); Matron Stakes (1973); Travers Stakes (1973); Dwyer Stakes (1974); Edgemere Handicap (1974, 1976); Santa Anita Handicap (1974); Cornhusker Handicap (1975); Queens County Handicap (1975); American Derby (1976); Aqueduct Handicap (1976); Stymie Handicap (1976, 1977); Alcibiades Stakes (1977); Arlington-Washington Lassie Stakes (1977); Adirondack Stakes (1977); Cup and Saucer Stakes (1977); Schuylerville Stakes (1977); Stars and Stripes Turf Handicap (1978) American Classic Race wins: Kentucky Derby (1972, 1973); Preakness Stakes (1965, 1973); Belmont Stakes (1972, 1973); United States Triple Crown (1973)

Racing awards
- Leading jockey at Woodbine Racetrack (1962, 1963); Canadian Racing's Man-of-the-Year (1978); Big Sport of Turfdom Award (1978); George Woolf Memorial Jockey Award (1979); Avelino Gomez Memorial Award (1984)

Honours
- New Brunswick Sports Hall of Fame (1973); Order of Canada (1974); National Museum of Racing and Hall of Fame (1979); New York Sports Hall of Fame; Canada's Sports Hall of Fame (1980); Canadian Horse Racing Hall of Fame (1980); Hawthorne Racing Hall of Fame (1986); Paul Harris Fellowship; Long Island Sports Hall of Fame (1990)

Significant horses
- Arts and Letters, Crafty Lace, Dahlia, Damascus, Dark Mirage, Fanfreluche, Fort Marcy, Northern Dancer, Politely, Quadrangle, Riva Ridge, Secretariat, Shuvee, Tom Rolfe, Upper Case

Ronald Joseph Morel Turcotte (July 22, 1941 – August 22, 2025) was a Canadian thoroughbred race horse jockey best known as the rider of Secretariat, winner of the U.S. Triple Crown in 1973.

== Early life ==
Ron Turcotte was born on July 22, 1941, in Drummond, New Brunswick. His father was a lumberjack, and his family spoke French. Turcotte dropped out of school at 14 to work with his father, but due to his small stature, he was tasked with managing the horses.

== Career ==
Turcotte began his career in Toronto as a hot walker for E. P. Taylor's Windfields Farm in 1960, but he was soon wearing the silks and winning races. As an apprentice jockey, he rode Windfields's Northern Dancer to his first victory. He gained prominence with his victory aboard Tom Rolfe in the 1965 Preakness Stakes.

Turcotte soon started working with Canadian trainer Lucien Laurin at the racetrack in Laurel, Maryland.

In 1972, he rode Riva Ridge to victory in the Kentucky Derby and the Belmont Stakes.

Turcotte became internationally famous in 1973 when he rode Secretariat to win the first Triple Crown in 25 years, with records in each race and Secretariat's phenomenal finish 31 lengths ahead of the field in the Belmont. A photograph of Secretariat winning the Belmont, with Turcotte looking over his shoulder at the pack far behind, became famous. Turcotte was North America's leading stakes-winning jockey in 1972 and 1973. He was the first jockey to win back-to-back Kentucky Derbies since Jimmy Winkfield in 1902 and the first jockey ever to have won five of six consecutive Triple Crown races (matched in 2015 by Victor Espinoza).

He was voted the prestigious George Woolf Memorial Jockey Award, which honors a rider whose career and personal conduct exemplifies the very best of participants in the sport of thoroughbred racing. He was the first person from Thoroughbred racing ever to be appointed a member of the Order of Canada.

Turcotte's career ended on July 13, 1978, when he fell from his horse, Flag of Leyte Gulf, during the 8th race at Belmont Park. He suffered injuries that rendered him a paraplegic. Turcotte sued the New York Racing Association and Jeffrey Fell, another jockey in the race, but ultimately lost the case.

He was inducted into the National Museum of Racing and Hall of Fame in 1979. He was voted into the New Brunswick Sports Hall of Fame and in 1980 was inducted into Canada's Sports Hall of Fame. In 1984 he became the first recipient of the Avelino Gomez Memorial Award, given annually to the jockey who is Canadian-born, Canadian-raised, or a regular in the country who has made significant contributions to the sport.

In 2015, a statue of Secretariat and Turcotte crossing the finish line at the Belmont Stakes was unveiled in Turcotte's hometown of Grand Falls, New Brunswick.

== Personal life and death ==
Born in Drummond, New Brunswick, Turcotte was one of 12 children. He left school at age 14 to work with his father as a lumberjack, then at age 18 headed to Toronto looking for construction work.

Turcotte lived in his home town of Grand Falls, New Brunswick, Canada, with his wife Gaëtane and their four daughters. He was an advocate for those with disabilities and helped to raise funds for disability programs.

As a well-known survivor of an on-track accident, Turcotte made appearances at racetracks to raise funds and awareness of the assistance that the Permanently Disabled Jockeys Fund (PDJF) provides to fellow injured riders.

Turcotte was hospitalized on March 9, 2015, following a single-vehicle accident in New Brunswick. The van he was driving flipped after hitting a snowbank. Turcotte and a friend were both injured in the accident. Turcotte sustained fractures to both legs, while his friend suffered minor injuries.

Turcotte died at his home in Drummond, New Brunswick, on August 22, 2025, at the age of 84.

== Media ==
In the 2010 Disney movie Secretariat, the role of Turcotte as Secretariat's jockey is played by Otto Thorwarth, a real-life jockey himself.

Directed by Phil Comeau, a National Film Board of Canada documentary feature film on Turcotte's life and career, Secretariat's Jockey, Ron Turcotte, had its world premiere in Louisville, Kentucky, in May 2013.
