= Sapling Stakes =

- Class: Ungraded Stakes
- Location: Monmouth Park; Oceanport, New Jersey USA
- Inaugurated: 1883
- Race type: Thoroughbred – Flat racing
- Website: www.monmouthpark.com

Race information
- Distance: 8 furlongs
- Surface: Dirt
- Track: left-handed
- Qualification: Two-year-olds
- Weight: Assigned
- Purse: $201,000 (2021)

The Sapling Stakes is an American Ungraded Thoroughbred horse race run annually in early September at Monmouth Park in Oceanport, New Jersey. Open to 2-year-olds, it was raced on dirt over a distance of six furlongs for a current purse of $100,000. In 2014, its distance was set at 1 mile or 8 furlongs.

First run in 1883, the New Jersey Legislature passed a law in 1894 that banned parimutuel betting in the state and the track closed. In 1946, the state legislature passed a bill providing for state regulation of horse racing and the Sapling Stakes was revived.

In 1952, the race was run in two divisions.

This race was downgraded to a Listed Status for its 2014 running.

== Records ==
Time record:

- 1:07.84 – Gilded Time (1992) (6 furlongs)
- 1:37.20 - Lost Ark (2022) (8 furlongs)

Most wins by an owner:

- 3 – James Cox Brady Jr. (1949, 1952, 1953)

Most wins by a jockey:

- 4 – Paco Lopez (2012, 2014, 2016, 2021)
- 3 – Braulio Baeza (1964, 1965, 1968)
- 3 – Craig Perret (1980, 1982, 1996)
- 3 – Joe Bravo (1997, 2000, 2006)

Most wins by a trainer:

- 8 – D. Wayne Lukas (1987, 1989, 1990, 1991, 1994, 1995, 1997, 1998)

== Winners of the Sapling stakes ==
Year	Winner	Jockey	Trainer	Owner	Time
2025	One More Freud	Samy Camacho	Michael J. Maker	Paradise Farms Corp.	1:38.36
2024	Crazy Frazy	Carlos Eduardo Rojas	Jose Delgado	Lea Farms	1:39.55
2023	Noted	Jairo Rendon	Todd Pletcher	Repole Stable	1:38.91
2022	Lost Ark	Javier Castellano	Todd Pletcher	Harrell Ventures LLC	1:37.20
2021	Double Thunder	Paco Lopez	Todd Pletcher	Phoenix Thoroughbred III	1:38.76
2016	Tip Tap Tapizar	Paco Lopez	Steve Asmussen	Whispering Oaks Farm	1:39.00
2015	Sunny Ridge	Nik Juarez	Jason Servis	Dennis Drazin	1:39.80
2014	Souper Colossal	Paco Lopez	Edward Plesa Jr.	Live Oak Plantation	1:38.44
2013	Dunkin Bend	Ricardo Santana Jr.	Steve Asmussen	Michael Langford	1:11.82
2012	Brave Dave	Paco Lopez	Edward Plesa Jr.	Melin/Plesa	1:10.44
2011	She Digs Me	Elvis Trujillo	Steve Asmussen	Kirk & Judy Robison	1:10.10
2010	Madman Diaries	Jeffrey Sanchez	Wesley A. Ward	Robert Teel & Wesley A. Ward	1:11.64
2009	Western Smoke	Elvis Trujillo	Steve Asmussen	Kirk & Judy Robison	1:09.55
2008	Silent Valor	Stewart Elliott	Todd Pletcher	Let's Go Stable	1:10.26
2007	Lantana Mob	Stewart Elliott	Steve Asmussen	Vinery Stables	1:09.97
2006	Xchanger	Joe Bravo	Mark Shuman	Circle Z Stables	1:10.68
2005	He's Got Grit	Aaron Gryder	Steve Asmussen	Curtis C. Greene	1:09.69
2004	Evil Minister	Julian Pimentel	Erik Juvonen	Namcook Stables	1:11.21
2003	Dashboard Drummer	José C. Ferrer	Allen Iwinski	Edwin Wachtel et al.	1:10.84
2002	Valid Video	Chuck C. Lopez	Dennis Manning	Mac Fehsenfeld	1:09.88
2001	Pure Precision	Eibar Coa	John J. Tammaro III	Kinsman Stable	1:10.82
2000	Shooter	Joe Bravo	John F. Dowd	L. & R. Hurley & D J Stable	1:10.63
1999	Dont Tell the Kids	Jorge Tejeira	Robert J. Durso	O. Wayne Link	1:10.18
1998	Yes It's True	Shane Sellers	D. Wayne Lukas	Padua Stables	1:10.09
1997	Double Honor	Joe Bravo	D. Wayne Lukas	Ahmed bin Salman	1:09.75
1996	Smoke Glacken	Craig Perret	Henry L. Carroll	Karkenny Levy et al.	1:10.16
1995	Hennessy	Donna Barton	D. Wayne Lukas	Bob & Beverly Lewis	1:10.84
1994	Boone's Mill	Pat Day	D. Wayne Lukas	William T. Young	1:10.40
1993	Sacred Honour	Carlos Lopez Sr.	Ben Perkins Jr.	John A. Franks	1:11.00
1992	Gilded Time	Chris McCarron	Darrell Vienna	Milch, Silverman & Silverman	1:07.80
1991	Big Sur	Richard Migliore	D. Wayne Lukas	Kaskel, Lukas & Young	1:10.80
1990	Deposit Ticket	Gary Stevens	D. Wayne Lukas	Overbrook Farm & Lukas	1:11.00
1989	Carson City	Julie Krone	D. Wayne Lukas	William T. Young	1:10.40
1988	Bio	Patrick A. Johnson	Steven C. Penrod	W. W. Hancock III	1:10.40
1987	Tejano	Jacinto Vásquez	D. Wayne Lukas	Lloyd R. French Jr.	1:09.00
1986	Bet Twice	Chris Antley	Warren A. Croll Jr.	Levy & Cisley Stable	1:10.20
1985	Hilco Scamper	Gary Stevens	Mike Chambers	Wright-Cross-Roch	1:10.80
1984	Doubly Clear	Joseph Garcia	Stephen C. Rowan	Judy Bujnicki	1:10.40
1983	Smart n Slick	Donnie Miller Jr.	Jerry C. Meyer	A. Hawk	1:10.80
1982	O.K. by You	Craig Perret	Walter Reese	Timber Creek Farm	1:10.80
1981	Out of Hock	Don Brumfield	Stanley M. Rieser	Charles J. Cella	1:10.20
1980	Travelling Music	Craig Perret	J. Bowes Bond	Elberon Farm	1:11.00
1979	Rockhill Native	John Oldham	Herbert K. Stevens	Harry A. Oak	1:08.80
1978	Tim the Tiger	Jeffrey Fell	John M. Veitch	Calumet Farm	1:11.80
1977	Alydar	Eddie Maple	John M. Veitch	Calumet Farm	1:10.60
1976	Ali Oop	Larry Saumell	Warren A. Croll Jr.	Jaclyn Stable	1:09.80
1975	Full Out	Buck Thornburg	Odie Lee	Buckland Farm	1:11.60
1974	Foolish Pleasure	Jacinto Vásquez	LeRoy Jolley	John L. Greer	1:10.40
1973	Tisab	Walter Blum	James E. O'Bryant	Mill Ridge Farm	1:10.20
1972	Assagai Jr.	Joseph Imparato	Cy Butler	Herbert Marant & John Sessa	1:10.80
1971	Chevron Flight	Martin Fromin	Tommy Heard Jr.	Caesar P. Kimmel	1:11.80
1970	Staunch Avenger	David E. Whited	Gin L. Collins	Annette Mann	1:11.40
1969	Ring For Nurse	Michael Miceli	Don Levine	Red Brick Stable	1:11.80
1968	Reviewer	Braulio Baeza	Edward A. Neloy	Ogden Phipps	1:10.40
1967	Subpet	Ray Broussard	Warren A. Croll Jr.	Tom LeClair	1:10.40
1966	Great Power	Bill Shoemaker	Edward A. Neloy	Wheatley Stable	1:09.40
1965	Buckpasser	Braulio Baeza	William C. Winfrey	Ogden Phipps	1:10.60
1964	Bold Lad	Braulio Baeza	William C. Winfrey	Wheatley Stable	1:09.40
1963	Mr. Brick	Larry Adams	Charles A. DuBois	Roy Sturgis	1:10.60
1962	Delta Judge	Ray Broussard	Clyde Troutt	Ada L. Rice	1:10.60
1961	Sir Gaylord	Ismael Valenzuela	Casey Hayes	Meadow Stable	1:10.60
1960	Hail To Reason	Bobby Ussery	Hirsch Jacobs	Patrice Jacobs	1:10.40
1959	Sky Clipper	Willie Harmatz	Howard Hausner	William G. Helis Jr.	1:11.40
1958	Watch Your Step	Eric Guerin	C. W. Parish	Circle M Farm	1:10.60
1957	Plion	Nick Shuk	Tom Jolley	Edward J. Potter Jr.	1:11.40
1956	King Hairan	Eddie Arcaro	Leonard H. Hunt	Massey & Edwards	1:10.80
1955	Needles	John Choquette	Hugh L. Fontaine	D-H Stables	1:10.60
1954	Royal Coinage	Jack Skelly	Anthony J. Pupino	Clearwater Stable	1:11.00
1953	Artismo	James Stout	Robert L. Dotter	James Cox Brady Jr.	1:11.00
1952	Landlocked	Fernando Fernandez	Robert L. Dotter	James Cox Brady Jr.	1:13.00
1952	Laffango	Fred Pannell	Merritt A. Buxton	Trio Stable	1:12.80
1951	Landseair	James Stout	J. Bowes Bond	High Ground Stable	1:12.60
1950	Battlefield	Eddie Arcaro	Jack Creevy	George D. Widener Jr.	1:10.80
1949	Casemate	John Gilbert	Robert L. Dotter	James Cox Brady Jr.	1:11.60
1948	Blue Peter	Eric Guerin	Andy Schuttinger	Joseph M. Roebling	1:12.80
1947	Task	Robert J. Martin	William J. Hirsch	King Ranch	1:11.60
1946	Donor	Job Dean Jessop	Preston M. Burch	W. Deering Howe	1:12.20

== Earlier winners ==
- 1883 – Duchess (W. Donohue) 1:18.75
- 1884 – Brookwood (Edward Feakes) 1:15.50
- 1885 – Savanac (R. Olney) 1:17 .00
- 1886 – Hanover (Jim McLaughlin) 1:17.50
- 1887 – Fitz James (Edward H. Garrison) 1:16.50
- 1888 – Tipstaff (Eilke) 1:15.25
- 1889 – Devotee (W. Hayward) 1:15.25
- 1890 – Sorcerer (F. Reagan) 1:16.25
- 1891 – Air Plant (Anthony Hamilton) 1:12.75
- 1892 – Don Alonzo (Fred Taral) 1:13.75
- 1893 – Senator Grady (W. Midgley) 1:05.00

Note: the 1893 race was run at 5 1/2 furlongs on the straight course.
