= Prospect Point (horse) =

American-bred Thoroughbred racehorse

- Sire: First Dawn
- Grandsire: Bold Ruler
- Dam: Our Vivian
- Damsire: Tronado (ARG)
- Sex: Gelding
- Foaled: 1978
- Country: United States
- Color: Bay
- Breeder: Forest Retreat Farms and Lloyd I. Miller
- Owner: Claudie M. Godsey (racing career); Gail Earle (retirement)
- Trainer: Claudie M. Godsey
- Record: 72: 7-8-10
- Earnings: $28,553

Prospect Point (March 4, 1978 – September 23, 2016) was one of the longest lived Thoroughbreds on record. He lived to the age of 38 years and 203 days before dying on September 23, 2016.

== Background and family ==
Prospect Point was bred in Kentucky by Forest Retreat Farms and Lloyd I. Miller. He was sired by First Dawn, an unraced minor stallion bred by the great Ogden Phipps. His paternal granddam, Lovely Morning, was a half sister to American Champion Two-Year-Old Male Horses and Grade I winners Successor and Bold Lad. His damsire, Tronado, was an Argentinean bred who won graded stakes in both the United States and Argentina, most notably winning the Donn Handicap and Arlington Handicap.

During his racing career, Prospect Point was owned by Claudie M. Godsey, who also trained him. Godsey still trains horses as of 2017.

== Racing career ==
In a racing career of five years, Prospect Park started 72 times, winning 7 races, finishing second in 8, and finishing third in 10. He collected $28,553 in earnings.

Though he raced primarily at Ellis Park, he also raced at Churchill Downs, Keeneland, Waterford Park (now Mountaineer Park), and Latonia Park (now Turfway Park). He never contested a stakes race or handicap.

Prospect Point broke his maiden on February 24, 1981, in a maiden claiming race. The race was his 9th start. His last win came on August 21, 1984, at Ellis Park, in a claiming race. He last raced on July 10, 1985, in the fifth race at Waterford Park, a $1,500 claiming race, in which he finished 11th.

He was retired some point after 1985.

== Retirement ==
According to eventual owner Gail Earle, attempts were made to turn him into a polo pony after his retirement, but he did not take to the sport.

Earle, a resident of Pageland, South Carolina, acquired Prospect Point in 1988, and used him as a hunter-jumper until 1993, when he developed lameness issues. Afterwards, he was still ridden for recreational purposes. Prospect Point was ridden until age 32, after which he became a pasture horse.

In his advanced age, Prospect Point was noted to be quite healthy, happy and bright, which is rare for older horses. His main health issues were poor eyesight and arthritis, which prevented him from frolicking, something he often wanted to do. Like many older horses, he was slow, and had lost a few teeth over time. His favorite activity was playing with his pasture mate, a donkey.

Prospect Point's longest live record was broken by Japanese thoroughbred, named Arrow Hamakiyo, renamed Charlotte later, who lived to be 40 years old.

== Death ==
Prospect Point's health began to rapidly deteriorate in mid-2016. The horse had lost his appetite "out of the blue", and still refused to eat after being placed on antibiotics, losing a great amount of weight in the process. His body shutting down, Earle did not want him to suffer, so she made the decision to euthanize him.

Prospect Point was euthanized on September 23, 2016, at the age of 38 years and 204 days.

It is unknown as to why Prospect Point lived as long as he did. The average life expectancy for a Thoroughbred is between the ages of 25 and 28.

== Merrick, Tango Duke and others ==
The second longest lived Thoroughbred on record is Merrick, a track record-setting gelding born in 1903, who died in 1941. He lived to the age of 38 years and 52 days. Merrick is the horse for which the Merrick Inn in Lexington, Kentucky is named after, and he is buried there.

Reports have also stated that an Australian gelding named Tango Duke lived until the age of 42.

In Japan, as a male horse, Charlotte lived until he was 40 years and 81 days. Also, as a female horse, Rookie lived until 38 years and 67 days.

According to his owner, a horse named Dead Solid Perfect died on November 8, 2022, after living for 39 years and 188 days before dying.

On May 13, 2025, New Year's Eve (Night Conqueror) died at the age of 39 years and 57 days.

== Pedigree ==
Pedigree of Prospect Point, bay horse, March 4, 1978
| Sire First Dawn 1971 | Bold Ruler; 1954 | Nasrullah | Nearco |
| Sire First Dawn 1971 | Bold Ruler; 1954 | Nasrullah | Mumtaz Begum |
| Sire First Dawn 1971 | Bold Ruler; 1954 | Miss Disco | Discovery |
| Sire First Dawn 1971 | Bold Ruler; 1954 | Miss Disco | Outdone |
| Sire First Dawn 1971 | Lovely Morning; 1965 | Swaps | Khaled |
| Sire First Dawn 1971 | Lovely Morning; 1965 | Swaps | Iron Reward |
| Sire First Dawn 1971 | Lovely Morning; 1965 | Misty Morn | Princequillo |
| Sire First Dawn 1971 | Lovely Morning; 1965 | Misty Morn | Grey Flight |
| Dam Our Vivian 1972 | Tronado (ARG); 1960 | The Yuvaraj | Fairway |
| Dam Our Vivian 1972 | Tronado (ARG); 1960 | The Yuvaraj | Epona |
| Dam Our Vivian 1972 | Tronado (ARG); 1960 | Her Majesty | Diadoque |
| Dam Our Vivian 1972 | Tronado (ARG); 1960 | Her Majesty | Heat Wave |
| Dam Our Vivian 1972 | Ye-Cats; 1961 | Mr. Busher | War Admiral |
| Dam Our Vivian 1972 | Ye-Cats; 1961 | Mr. Busher | Baby League |
| Dam Our Vivian 1972 | Ye-Cats; 1961 | Elope | Heliopolis |
| Dam Our Vivian 1972 | Ye-Cats; 1961 | Elope | Late Date |
