= Carey Winfrey =

American journalist

- Education: Columbia College (BA); Columbia University Graduate School of Journalism (MA)
- Alma mater: Masters School
- Occupations: Journalist, editor
- Known for: Editor-in-chief of the Smithsonian
- Parent: Bill Winfrey
- Relatives: G. Carey Winfrey (grandfather)

Carey Winfrey is an American journalist. He was the founding editor of Memories magazine and the former editor-in-chief of Cuisine, American Health and Smithsonian magazines.

== Biography ==
Winfrey is the son of American Hall of Fame Thoroughbred racehorse trainer Bill Winfrey and grandson of racehorse owner and trainer G. Carey Winfrey. He graduated from the McDonogh School in Owings Mills, Maryland, Columbia College in 1963 and Columbia University Graduate School of Journalism in 1967.

After graduating from Columbia, Winfrey was chosen to be an intern at the Public Broadcast Laboratory and went to Hong Kong on a Pulitzer Traveling Fellowship. He wrote for the Far Eastern Economic Review and worked as a reporter, commentator and producer for HK-TVB. Upon returning to the United States, he worked as a journalist for Time magazine. In 1971, Winfrey joined WNET as a producer for the network's media analysis program Behind the Lines. In 1975, he became the executive producer of Assignment America, a weekly conversation and documentary series.

In 1977, he joined The New York Times in the metropolitan desk. He then covered the Jonestown massacre in Guyana for The Times and then was posted to Nairobi, Kenya, where he covered sub-Saharan Africa affairs, including the ousting of Idi Amin.

Winfrey later returned to broadcasting and joined CBS Cable, as director of video development and was named editor-in-chief of CBS' Cuisine in 1983. In 1988, he launched the critically acclaimed Memories magazine, which was named "Best New Magazine" of 1989 by Advertising Age. After the magazine folded due to industry-wide recession, he became editor-in-chief of American Health in 1990. After six years at the magazine, he joined the faculty of Columbia University Graduate School of Journalism as head of the Delacorte Center for Magazine Study.

In 2001, he was named editor-in-chief of the Smithsonian, the third editor in the magazine's 40-year history. Under his leadership, the magazine was named "most interesting" by Affinity's American Magazine Study in 2011. He retired from the Smithsonian in September 2011.
