= High Voltage (horse) =

American-bred Thoroughbred racehorse

- Sire: Ambiorix
- Grandsire: Tourbillon
- Dam: Dynamo
- Damsire: Menow
- Sex: Filly
- Foaled: 1952
- Country: United States
- Colour: Gray
- Breeder: Wheatley Stable
- Owner: Wheatley Stable
- Trainer: James E. Fitzsimmons
- Record: 45: 13-5-7
- Earnings: US$362,240

Major wins
- Colleen Stakes (1954); Matron Stakes (1954); National Stallion Stakes Fillies Division (1954); Selima Stakes (1954); Rosedale Stakes (1954); Acorn Stakes (1955); Black-Eyed Susan Stakes (1955); Coaching Club American Oaks (1955); Delaware Oaks (1955); Vineland Handicap (1955)

Awards
- American Champion Two-Year-Old Filly (1954)
- Last updated on January 12, 2010

High Voltage (foaled 1952 in Kentucky) was a Thoroughbred racehorse who was the American Champion Two-Year-Old Filly of 1954.

Bred and raced by Gladys Mills Phipps' Wheatley Stable, High Voltage was conditioned for racing by U.S. Racing Hall of Fame trainer Sunny Jim Fitzsimmons. En route to her two-year-old Championship, High Voltage won five stakes races, including the Matron Stakes, in which she defeated Lalun.

At age three, High Voltage won five more stakes races, notably taking the 1955 Acorn Stakes and again defeating Lalun in winning the Coaching Club American Oaks. In spite of her strong performances in 1955, High Voltage finished behind stablemate Misty Morn in the balloting for American Champion Three-Year-Old Filly honors.

== Broodmare ==
Retired to broodmare duty, High Voltage was bred to the very best stallions in the United States. She produced five foals by Wheatley Stable's Bold Ruler as well as one with their Bold Lad. Two of her foals were sired by Princequillo, one by Ribot, and another by Court Martial. Her progeny met with modest success in racing, but a stakes-winning son, Bold Commander, by Bold Ruler, set a Laurel Park Racecourse for 8.5 furlongs and went on to sire 1970 Kentucky Derby winner Dust Commander. High Voltage died in 1968.

== Pedigree ==
Pedigree of High Voltage, gray horse, 1952
Sire Ambiorix	Tourbillon	Ksar	Bruleur
Sire Ambiorix	Tourbillon	Ksar	Kizil Kourgan
Sire Ambiorix	Tourbillon	Durban	Durbar
Sire Ambiorix	Tourbillon	Durban	Banshee
Sire Ambiorix	Lavendula	Pharos	Phalaris
Sire Ambiorix	Lavendula	Pharos	Scapa Flow
Sire Ambiorix	Lavendula	Sweet Lavender	Swynford
Sire Ambiorix	Lavendula	Sweet Lavender	Marchetta
Dam Dynamo	Menow	Pharamond	Phalaris
Dam Dynamo	Menow	Pharamond	Selene
Dam Dynamo	Menow	Alcibiades	Supremus
Dam Dynamo	Menow	Alcibiades	Regal Roman
Dam Dynamo	Bransome	Royal Minstrel	Tetratema
Dam Dynamo	Bransome	Royal Minstrel	Harpsichord
Dam Dynamo	Bransome	Erin	Transmute
Dam Dynamo	Bransome	Erin	Rosie O'Grady (family: 8-c)
