= Providence Stakes =

- Class: Discontinued stakes
- Location: Narragansett Race Track; Pawtucket, Rhode Island
- Inaugurated: 1946
- Race type: Thoroughbred - Flat racing

Race information
- Distance: 1 1/8 miles (9 furlongs)
- Track: Dirt, left-handed
- Qualification: Three-years-old

The Providence Stakes was an American Thoroughbred horse race run annually at Narragansett Park in Pawtucket, Rhode Island and restricted to three-year-olds. The race was first run in 1946 and continued until 1960.

The inaugural race was run May 25, 1946. With the ending of the Second World War, Narragansett Park looked to revive its stakes program, and the race drew a good field. Pellicle rebounded from an 8th-place finish in that years Kentucky Derby with an impressive 6 length score under jockey George Hettinger.

The first three editions were contested over one mile and a sixteenth. Narragansett revised its stakes program in 1947. It lost several popular races scheduled for the fall meet due to an outbreak of Swamp Fever that summer. The Providence Stakes, however, was chosen to have an increase in its purse level to $25,000 and lured good fields with worthy winners. Young Peter proved best for future U. S. Racing Hall of Fame trainer George M. Odom in the 1947 event as he used the race as preparation for a Travers Stakes victory in August. Another top horse, Vulcan's Forge, then won for C.V. Whitney the very next year.

Track management decided to extend the race to 1 and 1/8 miles in 1949 while pulling the purse back to $15,000 added. The race was then placed in early July. This seemed to fill a void in the calendar as the stakes event remained popular. With the return to $25,000 added (in 1951) many top horses again came to 'Gansett. Even a move to August in 1954 worked out, as the Providence Stakes saw its only dead heat. Red Hannigan (by the leading sire of the year Heliopolis) and Noble Risk hit the wire together and provided the fans with two winners.

1955 was a year in which Hall of Fame trainer Sunny Jim Fitzsimmons (inducted 1958) brought a promising three-year-old filly, named Misty Morn, to Narragansett. She would upset Saratoga, a horse that had run second on occasion to the Fitzsimmons trained champion Nashua. The three-year-old colt Saratoga burst to a 6-length lead, before slowing down and then re-breaking, only to take a bite out of the third-place horse as Misty Morn under Ted Atkinson flew by them all. Saratoga was disqualified to third and Misty Morn went on to be voted the American Champion Three-Year-Old Filly after subsequent victories in the Molly Pitcher, Monmouth Oaks and Diana Handicap. She was also named the American Champion Older Female Horse for 1955 under the ownership of Wheatley Stable.

In 1956, the track offered its largest purse of $57,900, making that years event the richest race ever run at Gansett. Jockey Walter Blum (inducted into the U. S. Racing Hall of Fame in 1987) booted home the appropriately titled Piecesofeight to a 3/4-length victory at 8–1 on the tote board for Daniel Reynolds who raced under the Nom de course, Keystone Stable.

The ill-fated Sidney Cole rode Bureaucracy to a win in 1957 for owner Ogden Phipps and trainer Sunny Jim Fitzsimmons. Blum returned to win on Backbone in the next years edition. Thus, Blum is the only two-time winning jockey of the Providence Stakes and Fitzsimmons is the only trainer to win the race twice.

Track President James Dooley (Rhode Island politician) died in December 1960 and the race was discontinued. The James E. Dooley Memorial took its place as a greatly reduced race in 1961 and ran until the late 60's.

== Records ==
Speed record:

- 1:49 4/5 @ 1 1/8 miles: Dictar (1953)

Most wins by a jockey:

- 2 - Walter Blum (1956, 1958)

Most wins by a trainer:

- 2 - James E. Fitzsimmons

Most wins by an owner:

- No owner won this race more than once

== Winners ==
Year	Winner	Age	Jockey	Trainer	Owner	Dist. (Miles)	Time
1960	Phil Rube	3	Bill Skuse	Bill Purver	William J. Beattie	11/8 m	1:53.00
1959	Ring of Kerry	3	Jimmy Davern	William J. Hirsch	King Ranch	11/8 m	1:52.40
1958	Backbone	3	Walter Blum	Lloyd Murray	Christopher J. Devine	11/8 m	1:50.60
1957	Bureaucracy	3	Sidney Cole	James E. Fitzsimmons	Ogden Phipps	11/8 m	1:51.40
1956	Piecesofeight	3	Walter Blum	George J. Zateslo	Keystone Stable (Daniel L. Reynolds)	11/8 m	1:50.80
1955	Misty Morn	3	Ted Atkinson	James E. Fitzsimmons	Wheatley Stable	11/8 m	1:52.00
1954 *	Red Hannigan; Noble Risk	3	Frank Solimena; Paul Bohenko	Homer C. Pardue; Edward A. Neloy	Woodley Lane (Joe Straus, Lafayette Ward, Steven B. Wilson); Saxon Stable (Max Prestridge & Riley Allison)	11/8 m	1:50.20
1953	Dictar	3	Hedley Woodhouse	George Auerbach	George Auerbach	11/8 m	1:49.80
1952	Jampol	3	Eugene Rodriguez	Max Kahlbaum	Max Kahlbaum	11/8 m	1:51.60
1951	Loridale	3	Bill Fisk	Arthur H. Warner	Arthur H. Warner	11/8 m	1:51.40
1950	Passemson	3	Porter Roberts	Leonard H. Hunt	B. L. Williams	11/8 m	1:51.40
1949	Reveille	3	Conn McCreary	Winbert F. Mulholland	George D. Widener	11/8 m	1:51.00
1948	Vulcan's Forge	3	Shelby Clark	Sylvester Veitch	C. V. Whitney	11/16 m	1:44.20
1947	Young Peter	3	Tommy May	George M. Odom	Mrs. Robert L. Gerry	11/16 m	1:44.20
1946	Pellicle	3	George Hettinger	Walter U. Ridenour	Hal Price Headley	11/16 m	1:44.40

- Dead Heat.
