= G. Carey Winfrey =

American thoroughbred racehorse owner and trainer

Carey Winfrey
Personal information
- Born: March 15, 1885 Wills Point, Texas, USA
- Died: November 13, 1962 (aged 77) Queens, New York City

Horse racing career
- Sport: Horse racing
- Career wins: 940

Major racing wins
- Paumonok Handicap (1919, 1953); Butler Handicap (1950); Bay Shore Handicap (1953); Butler Handicap (1950); Jerome Handicap (1954); Jersey Derby (1955); Brooklyn Handicap (1956); Hawthorne Gold Cup Handicap (1956); Monmouth Handicap (1957); Whitney Handicap (1956); Woodward Stakes (1957)

Honours
- U. S. Racing Hall of Fame (1975)

Significant horses
- Dedicate, Squared Away, Bulwark, Aboyne, Martyr, Son of Erin

George Carey Winfrey (March 15, 1885 – November 13, 1962) was an American thoroughbred racehorse owner and trainer who was inducted into the National Museum of Racing and Hall of Fame.

He was born in Wills Point, Texas, on March 15, 1885. He learned the art of training thoroughbreds at the Gravesend track in Brooklyn in 1904 from such masters as Sam Hildreth and Johnny Powers.

Winfrey maintained a small but successful stable. He raced horses he owned as well as several for his married daughter, Jan Winfrey Burke. He never had more than 10 horses in his care at one time, but he won 940 races in his career with purse earnings of $2.4 million. He was honored by the New York Turf Writers in 1956 for "Excellence in the Training of Thoroughbreds."

Winfrey trained his first stakes winner in 1931, sending out Charon to win the Myrtle Claiming Stakes at Aqueduct. His other stakes winners included Dedicate, Squared Away, Bulwark, Aboyne, Martyr, and Son of Erin. Squared Away won stakes in five seasons, while Dedicate was the U. S. Champion Handicap Horse of 1957. That year, he defeated Gallant Man and Bold Ruler in the Woodward Stakes.

Carey Winfrey died on November 13, 1962, in Queens, New York City.

== Legacy ==
G. Carey Winfrey was inducted into the National Museum of Racing's Hall of Fame in 1975. His adopted son, Bill Winfrey, is also in the National Museum of Racing's Hall of Fame. His grandson, Carey Winfrey, was the editor-in-chief of the Smithsonian, Cuisine, and American Health magazines.
