= American Champion Two-Year-Old Male Horse =

Award for American racehorses

The American Champion Two-Year-Old Male Horse is an American Thoroughbred horse racing honor awarded annually in Thoroughbred flat racing. It became part of the Eclipse Awards program in 1971.

The award originated in 1936 when the Daily Racing Form (DRF) began naming an annual champion. In the same year, the Baltimore-based Turf and Sports Digest magazine instituted a similar award. Starting in 1950, the Thoroughbred Racing Associations (TRA) began naming its own champion. The following list provides the name of the horses chosen by these organizations. Whenever there were different champions named, the horses are listed side by side with the one chosen as champion by the Daily Racing Form noted with the letters (DRF), the one chosen by the Thoroughbred Racing Associations by the letters (TRA) and the one chosen by Turf and Sports Digest by the letters (TSD).

The Daily Racing Form, the Thoroughbred Racing Associations, and the National Turf Writers Association all joined forces in 1971 to create the Eclipse Award.

Champions from 1886 through 1935 were selected retrospectively by a panel of experts as published by The Blood-Horse magazine.

== Honorees ==
=== Eclipse Awards ===
Year	Horse	Trainer	Owner
2025	Ted Noffey	Todd A. Pletcher	Spendthrift Farm
2024	Citizen Bull	Bob Baffert	SF Racing, Starlight Racing, Madaket Stables, Robert E. Masterson, Stonestreet Stables, Dianne Bashor, Determined Stables, Tom J. Ryan, Waves Edge Capital and Catherine Donovan
2023	Fierceness	Todd A. Pletcher	Repole Stables
2022	Forte	Todd A. Pletcher	Repole Stable & St. Elias Stable
2021	Corniche	Bob Baffert	Speedway Stables
2020	Essential Quality	Brad H. Cox	Godolphin
2019	Storm the Court	Peter Eurton	Exline-Border Racing LLC
2018	Game Winner	Bob Baffert	Mary & Gary West
2017	Good Magic	Chad Brown	e Five Racing Thoroughbreds and Stonestreet Stables
2016	Classic Empire	Mark Casse	John C. Oxley
2015	Nyquist	Doug O'Neill	Reddam Racing
2014	American Pharoah	Bob Baffert	Ahmed Zayat
2013	Shared Belief	Jerry Hollendorfer	Jungle Racing, Kmn Racing et al.
2012	Shanghai Bobby	Todd Pletcher	Starlight Racing
2011	Hansen	Mike Maker	K. Hansen & Sky Chai Racing
2010	Uncle Mo	Todd Pletcher	Mike Repole
2009	Lookin at Lucky	Bob Baffert	Mike Pegram, Karl Watson, Paul Weitman
2008	Midshipman	Bob Baffert	Godolphin Racing
2007	War Pass	Nicholas P. Zito	Robert V. LaPenta
2006	Street Sense	Carl Nafzger	James B. Tafel
2005	Stevie Wonderboy	Douglas F. O'Neill	Merv Griffin
2004	Declan's Moon	Ronald W. Ellis	Jay Em Ess Stables
2003	Action This Day	Richard E. Mandella	B. Wayne Hughes
2002	Vindication	Bob Baffert	Padua Stables
2001	Johannesburg	Aidan O'Brien	Michael Tabor & Sue Magnier
2000	Macho Uno	Joe Orseno	Stronach Stables
1999	Anees	Alex L. Hassinger Jr.	The Thoroughbred Corp.
1998	Answer Lively	Bobby C. Barnett	John A. Franks
1997	Favorite Trick	Patrick B. Byrne	Joseph LaCombe
1996	Boston Harbor	D. Wayne Lukas	Overbrook Farm
1995	Maria's Mon	Richard E. Schosberg	Mrs. Morton Rosenthal
1994	Timber Country	D. Wayne Lukas	Gainesway Stable, et al.
1993	Dehere	Reynaldo Nobles	Due Process Stable
1992	Gilded Time	Darrell Vienna	David Milch, Jack & Mark Silverman
1991	Arazi	François Boutin	Allen E. Paulson & Sheikh Mohammed
1990	Fly So Free	Flint S. Schulhofer	Tommy & Elizabeth Valando
1989	Rhythm	Claude R. McGaughey III	Ogden Mills Phipps
1988	Easy Goer	Claude R. McGaughey III	Ogden Phipps
1987	Forty Niner	Woody Stephens	Claiborne Farm
1986	Capote	D. Wayne Lukas	Beal, French Jr. & Klein
1985	Tasso	Neil D. Drysdale	Gerald Robins
1984	Chief's Crown	Roger Laurin	Star Crown Stable
1983	Devil's Bag	Woody Stephens	Hickory Tree Stable
1982	Roving Boy	Joseph Manzi	Robert E. Hibbert
1981	Deputy Minister	Bill Marko	Centurion Stables & Kinghaven Farms
1980	Lord Avie	Daniel Perlsweig	SKS Stable
1979	Rockhill Native	Herbert K. Stevens	Harry A. Oak
1978	Spectacular Bid	Bud Delp	Hawksworth Farm
1977	Affirmed	Laz Barrera	Harbor View Farm
1976	Seattle Slew	William H. Turner Jr.	Karen & Mickey Taylor
1975	Honest Pleasure	LeRoy Jolley	Bertram R. Firestone
1974	Foolish Pleasure	LeRoy Jolley	John L. Greer
1973	Protagonist	John P. Campo	Maxwell H. Gluck
1972	Secretariat	Lucien Laurin	Christopher Chenery
1971	Riva Ridge	Lucien Laurin	Christopher Chenery

=== Daily Racing Form, Turf & Sport Digest and Thoroughbred Racing Association Awards ===
Year	Horse	Trainer	Owner
1970	Hoist The Flag	Sidney Watters Jr.	Jane Forbes Clark
1969	Silent Screen	J. Bowes Bond	Elberon Farm
1968	Top Knight	Raymond Metcalf	Steven B. Wilson
1967	Vitriolic	Edward A. Neloy	Ogden Phipps
1966	Successor	Edward A. Neloy	Wheatley Stable
1965	Buckpasser	William C. Winfrey	Ogden Phipps
1964	Bold Lad	William C. Winfrey	Wheatley Stable
1963	Hurry to Market (TRA)(DRF)	David Erb	Roger W. Wilson & Mrs. T. P. Hull Jr.
1963	Raise a Native (TSD)	Burley Parke	Louis Wolfson
1962	Never Bend	Woody Stephens	Cain Hoy Stable
1961	Crimson Satan	Gordon R. Potter	Peter W. Salmen Sr.
1960	Hail to Reason	Hirsch Jacobs	Hirsch Jacobs & Harbor View Farm
1959	Warfare	Hack Ross	Clifton H. Jones
1958	First Landing	Casey Hayes	Christopher Chenery
1957	Nadir (DRF)	Moody Jolley	Claiborne Farm
1957	Jewel's Reward (TRA) (TSD)	Ivan H. Parke	Maine Chance Farm
1956	Barbizon	Horace A. Jones	Lucille P. Markey
1955	Needles	Hugh L. Fontaine	Jack Dudley & Bonnie Heath
1954	Nashua	James E. Fitzsimmons	Belair Stud
1953	Porterhouse (TRA) (DRF)	Charles E. Whittingham	Liz Whitney Tippett
1953	Hasty Road (TSD)	Harry Trotsek	Hasty House Farm
1952	Native Dancer	William C. Winfrey	Alfred G. Vanderbilt II
1951	Tom Fool	John M. Gaver Sr.	Greentree Stable
1950	Battlefield	Bert Mulholland	George D. Widener Jr.

=== Daily Racing Form and Turf & Sport Digest Awards ===
Year	Horse	Trainer	Owner
1949	Hill Prince (DRF)	Casey Hayes	Christopher Chenery
1949	Oil Capitol (TSD)	Harry Trotsek	Thomas Gray & Cora M. Trotsek
1948	Blue Peter	Andy Schuttinger	Joseph M. Roebling
1947	Citation	Ben & Horace Jones	Calumet Farm
1946	Double Jay	Walter L. McCue	James V. Tigani & James Boines
1945	Star Pilot	Tom Smith	Maine Chance Farm
1944	Pavot	Oscar White	Walter M. Jeffords Sr.
1943	Platter (DRF)	Bert Mulholland	George D. Widener Jr.
1943	Occupy (TSD)	Burley Parke	John Marsch
1942	Count Fleet	Don Cameron	Fannie Hertz
1941	Alsab	Sarge Swenke	Albert Sabath
1940	Whirlaway (TSD)	Ben A. Jones	Calumet Farm
1940	Our Boots (DRF)	Steve Judge	Royce G. Martin
1939	Bimelech	William A. Hurley	Edward R. Bradley
1938	El Chico	Matthew P. Brady	William Ziegler Jr.
1937	Menow	Duval A. Headley	Hal Price Headley
1936	Pompoon	Johnny Loftus	Jerome H. Louchheim

=== The Blood-Horse retrospective champions ===
Year	Horse	Trainer	Owner
1935	Tintagel	George M. Odom	Marshall Field III
1934	Balladier	Herbert J. Thompson	Edward R. Bradley
1933	Cavalcade	Robert Augustus Smith	Isabel Dodge Sloane
1932	Ladysman	Bud Stotler	William R. Coe
1931	Burning Blaze	John B. Partridge	Pat & Richard Nash
1930	Jamestown	A. Jack Joyner	George D. Widener Jr.
1930	Equipoise	Fred Hopkins	Cornelius Vanderbilt Whitney
1929	Whichone	James G. Rowe Jr.	Harry Payne Whitney
1928	High Strung	George M. Odom	Marshall Field III
1927	Reigh Count	Henry E. McDaniel	Fannie Hertz
1927	Dice	James E. Fitzsimmons	Wheatley Stable
1926	Scapa Flow	Scott P. Harlan	Walter M. Jeffords Sr.
1925	Pompey	William H. Karrick	William R. Coe
1924	Master Charlie	Andrew Blakely	William Daniel
1923	St. James	A. Jack Joyner	George D. Widener Jr.
1923	Wise Counsellor	John S. Ward	Frederick A. Burton & John S. Ward
1922	Zev	Sam Hildreth	Rancocas Stable
1921	Morvich	Fred Burlew	Benjamin Block
1920	Tryster	James G. Rowe Sr.	Harry Payne Whitney
1919	Man o' War	Louis Feustel	Samuel D. Riddle
1918	Billy Kelly	H. Guy Bedwell	J. K. L. Ross
1918	Eternal	Kimball Patterson	James W. McClelland
1917	Sun Briar	Henry E. McDaniel	Willis Sharpe Kilmer
1916	Campfire	Thomas J. Healey	Richard T. Wilson Jr.
1915	Dominant	James G. Rowe Sr.	Lewis S. Thompson
1914	Pebbles	Richard C. Benson	James Butler
1913	Old Rosebud	Frank D. Weir	Frank D. Weir & Hamilton Applegate
1912	Helios	John Oliver Keene	Johnson N. Camden Jr.
1911	Worth	Frank M. Taylor	Harry C. Hallenbeck
1910	Novelty	Sam Hildreth	Sam Hildreth
1909	Sweep	James G. Rowe Sr.	James R. Keene
1909	Waldo	Raleigh Colston Jr.	Charles L. Harrison
1908	Sir Martin	John E. Madden	John E. Madden
1907	Colin	James G. Rowe Sr.	James R. Keene
1906	Salvidere	John E. Madden	Thomas Hitchcock
1905	Burgomaster	John W. Rogers	Harry Payne Whitney
1904	Sysonby	James G. Rowe Sr.	James R. Keene
1903	Highball	John W. May	Walter M. Scheftel & John W. May
1902	Irish Lad	John E. Madden	H. P. Whitney & H. B. Duryea
1901	Nasturtium	John W. Rogers	William Collins Whitney
1900	Commando	James G. Rowe Sr.	James R. Keene
1899	Mesmerist	Julius Bauer	Bromley and Co.
1899	Chacornac	James G. Rowe Sr.	James R. Keene
1898	Jean Bereaud	Sam Hildreth	Sydney Paget
1897	Hamburg	John E. Madden	John E. Madden
1896	Ogden	John Campbell	Marcus Daly
1895	Requital	James G. Rowe Sr.	David Gideon
1895	Ben Brush	Edward D. Brown	H. Eugene Leigh & Edward D. Brown
1894	none selected		
1893	Domino	William Lakeland	James R. Keene
1892	Morello	Frank Van Ness	William M. Singerly
1891	His Highness	John J. Hyland	David Gideon
1890	Potomac	James G. Rowe Sr.	August Belmont
1889	El Rio Rey	Alfred H. Estell	Theodore Winters
1888	Proctor Knott	Sam W. Bryant	S. W. Bryant & George Scoogan
1887	Emperor of Norfolk	John W. McClelland	E. J. "Lucky" Baldwin
1887	Raceland	James G. Rowe Sr.	August Belmont
1886	Tremont	Frank McCabe	Dwyer Brothers Stable
