= Prospect Point =

Prospect Point may refer to:

- Prospect Point (Antarctica), a headland at the west extremity of Velingrad Peninsula on Graham Coast in Graham Land
- Prospect Point Observation Tower, a tower located in Niagara Falls, New York, United States
- Prospect Point (British Columbia), a point at the northern tip of Stanley Park in Vancouver, British Columbia, Canada
- Prospect Point (horse), the longest lived thoroughbred known on record
- Prospect Point Camp, an Adirondack Great Camp notable for its unusual chalets inspired by hunting
