= Top Knight =

American Thoroughbred racehorse

- Sire: Vertex
- Grandsire: The Rhymer
- Dam: Ran-Tan
- Damsire: Summer Tan
- Sex: Stallion
- Foaled: 1966
- Country: United States
- Colour: Chestnut
- Breeder: Steve B. Wilson
- Owner: Steve B. Wilson
- Trainer: Raymond Metcalf; G. W. Taylor
- Record: 46: 11-6-8
- Earnings: $545,684

Major wins
- Hopeful Stakes (1968); Belmont Futurity Stakes (1968); Champagne Stakes (1968); Flamingo Stakes (1969); Florida Derby (1969)

Awards
- U.S. Champion 2-Yr-Old Colt (1968)

Top Knight (April 2, 1966 – 199?) was an American Champion Thoroughbred racehorse bred in Florida.

== Background ==
Top Knight was a chestnut horse owned and bred by Florida sportsman Steven B. Wilson, trained by Ray Metcalf and named 2 Year Old Male Champion in the United States. Top Knight came along at the end of the first wave of Champions bred in the Sunshine State as 1968 marked the year that Dr. Fager won four American titles (Handicap Horse, Grass Horse, Sprinter and Horse of the Year).

== Racing career (Beginning) ==
Top Knight began racing at age two and won five of his nine starts in 1968, including a 15-length maiden score in track-record time at Belmont Park. He went to Saratoga Race Course for two victories including the Hopeful Stakes. He then took his win streak to four in a row with scores in the Futurity and Champagne Stakes at Belmont to wrap up the 2-year-old championship and establish himself as a clear-cut Future Book favorite for the Kentucky Derby. He finished the year with a third in the rich 312k Garden State Stakes.

At age three, Top Knight won the two top Kentucky Derby prep races held in Florida. The victories in the rich Flamingo Stakes at Hialeah Park and the Florida Derby at Gulfstream Park established him as one of the favorites for the Kentucky Derby. Top Knight finished 5th as the 2-1 second wagering choice to Majestic Prince in "The Run for the Roses." After two fourth-place finishes in the Preakness Stakes and the Lamplighter Handicap Top Knight was retired to stud.

== Stud record ==
Top Knight proved to be infertile and was returned to racing.

== Late career ==
Top Knight resumed his racing career as a six year old under the ownership of The S. B. Wilson Estate and went on to win four more times. A highlight was when he won back-to-back races at Lincoln Downs under Anthony DeSpirito, a former United States champion jockey.

As a nine year old, now owned by Ardwin Farm, Top Knight turned in his last two starts at Narragansett Park, making him at least the 29th American Champion to run at that track. His final retirement was to a farm in Rehoboth, Massachusetts run by Edward and Brett Stevenson.

== Honors ==
Top Knight was voted 2 Year Old Male Champion in 1968.
