= Champagne Stakes (United States) =

Horse race in New York, United States

- Class: Grade I
- Location: Belmont Park; Elmont, New York, United States
- Inaugurated: 1867
- Race type: Thoroughbred – Flat racing
- Website: www.nyra.com

Race information
- Distance: 1 mile (8 furlongs)
- Surface: Dirt
- Track: left-handed
- Qualification: Two-year-olds
- Weight: 122 pounds
- Purse: $500,000 (since 2013)

The Champagne Stakes is an American Grade I Thoroughbred horse race for two-year-old horses. The race is run at a distance of one mile on the dirt at Belmont Park in October each year. Although the race is open to both colts and fillies, in practice it is New York's premier race for two-year-old colts and fillies enter the Frizette Stakes instead.

The race is a Road to the Kentucky Derby Prep Season qualifying race. The winner receives 10 points toward qualifying for the Kentucky Derby.

The race is also a part of the Breeders' Cup Challenge series. The winner automatically qualifies for the Breeders' Cup Juvenile.

The race was first run in 1867, and it is the oldest race of its kind in the United States. It was given the same name as the British Champagne Stakes which has been run annually since 1823 at the Doncaster Racecourse in South Yorkshire, England.

There was no Champagne Stakes run from 1910 through 1913, due to a legislated ban by the State of New York on parimutuel wagering, and no race was held in 1956.

Notable past winners who have gone on to success as three-year-olds or older include U.S. Triple Crown champions Seattle Slew, Count Fleet, and Secretariat however; Secretariat was disqualified from the race because of a questionable interference call which is still debatable today. Others such as Ben Brush, Colin, Sarazen, Alsab, Grey Lag, Buckpasser, Riva Ridge, Foolish Pleasure, Alydar, Spectacular Bid, and Easy Goer, all of whom are now in the National Museum of Racing and Hall of Fame. Easy Goer ran the best Beyer Speed Figure performance (in the 1988 Champagne Stakes) by any 2-year-old since Beyer racing figures were first published.

The 1880 winner was Lady Rosebery, a horse owned by August Belmont, Sr. and named to honor England's Hannah Primrose, Countess of Rosebery whose family was prominent in British racing. Similarly, the 1950 winner was Uncle Miltie, a horse given the nickname of the famous comedian and New York City native, Milton Berle.

The inaugural running of the Champagne Stakes took place in 1867 at Jerome Park Racetrack prior where it remained through 1889. Shifted to the Morris Park Racecourse facility, it was held there through 1904. Moved to its present home at Belmont Park for the 1905 racing season, it was run at the Aqueduct Racetrack in 1959, from 1963 to 1967, and again in 1984.

Over the years, the Champagne Stakes has been raced over a variety of distances:

- Six furlongs : 1871–1889
- Seven furlongs : 1891–1904
- 165 feet short of seven furlongs (Widener Course) : 1905–1932
- Six and one-half furlongs (Widener Course) : 1933–1939
- One mile : 1940–1983, 1985–1993; 2005 to present
- One and one-eighth miles : 1984
- One and one-sixteenth miles : 1994–2004

== Records ==
Speed record:

- 1:34.20 – Devil's Bag (1983)
- 1:34.40 – Seattle Slew (1976)

Most wins by an owner:

- 5 – Calumet Farm (1933, 1936, 1944, 1949, 1977)

Most wins by a jockey:

- 5 – Braulio Baeza (1964, 1965, 1966, 1967, 1975)

Most wins by a trainer:

- 6 – Todd A. Pletcher (2004, 2006, 2010, 2012, 2013, 2014)

== Winners of the Champagne Stakes since 1946 ==
Year	Winner	Jockey	Trainer	Owner	Time
2026	U.S.S. Valor	Manuel Franco	Claude R. McGaughey III	Team Valor International	1:34.84
2025	Napoleon Solo	Joel Rosario	Chad Summers	Gold Square LLC	1:34.57
2024	Chancer McPatrick	Flavien Prat	Chad C. Brown	Flanagan Racing	1:36.51
2023	Timberlake	Florent Geroux	Brad H. Cox	WinStar Farm & Siena Farm	1:35.90
2022	Blazing Sevens	Flavien Prat	Chad C. Brown	Rodeo Creek Racing LLC	1:37.07
2021	Jack Christopher	José Ortiz	Chad C. Brown	Jim Bakke, Gerry Isbister, Coolmore Stud & White Birch Farm	1:37.31
2020	Jackie's Warrior	Joel Rosario	Steven M. Asmussen	Kirk And Judy Robison	1:35.42
2019	Tiz the Law	Manny Franco	Barclay Tagg	Sackatoga Stable	1:35.41
2018	Complexity	José L. Ortiz	Chad C. Brown	Klaravich Stables, Inc.	1:34.63
2017	Firenze Fire	Irad Ortiz Jr.	Jason Servis	Mr. Amore Stable (Ron Lombardi)	1:35.91
2016	Practical Joke	Joel Rosario	Chad C. Brown	Klaravich Stables, Inc. & William Lawrence	1:34.68
2015	Greenpointcrusader	Joe Bravo	Dominick Schettino	St. Elias Stable, MeB Racing Stables, Brooklyn Boyz Stables	1:36.25
2014	Daredevil	Javier Castellano	Todd A. Pletcher	Let's Go Stable (managing partners Kevin Scatuorchio & Bryan Sullivan)	1:36.62
2013	Havana	Irad Ortiz Jr.	Todd A. Pletcher	Michael Tabor, Susan Magnier, Derrick Smith	1:35.81
2012	Shanghai Bobby	Rosie Napravnik	Todd A. Pletcher	Starlight Racing (Jack & Laurie Wolf)	1:35.55
2011	Union Rags	Javier Castellano	Michael Matz	Chadds Ford Stable	1:35.55
2010	Uncle Mo	John Velazquez	Todd A. Pletcher	Mike Repole	1:34.51
2009	Homeboykris	Edgar Prado	Richard E. Dutrow Jr.	Louis Lazzinnaro, Joseph Bulger, Jack Mandato, et al.	1:35.12
2008	Vineyard Haven	Edgar Prado	Robert J. Frankel	Robert J. Frankel	1:36.06
2007	War Pass	Cornelio Velásquez	Nicholas P. Zito	Robert V. LaPenta	1:36.12
2006	Scat Daddy	John R. Velazquez	Todd A. Pletcher	James T. Scaturochio & Michael Tabor	1:36.97
2005	First Samurai	Jerry D. Bailey	Frank L. Brothers	Bruce Lunsford & Lansdon B. Robbins III	1:36.29
2004	Proud Accolade	John R. Velazquez	Todd A. Pletcher	Padua Stables	1:42.30
2003	Birdstone	Jerry D. Bailey	Nicholas P. Zito	Marylou Whitney	1:44.05
2002	Toccet	Jorge Chavez	John F. Scanlan	Dan Borislow	1:44.45
2001	Officer	Victor Espinoza	Bob Baffert	The Thoroughbred Corp.	1:43.39
2000	A P Valentine	Jorge Chavez	Nicholas P. Zito	Celtic Pride Stable	1:41.45
1999	Greenwood Lake	Jean-Luc Samyn	Nicholas P. Zito	Dee Conway & Fred Dematteis	1:43.70
1998	The Groom Is Red	Corey Nakatani	Nicholas P. Zito	Celtic Pride Stable	1:42.91
1997	Grand Slam	Gary Stevens	D. Wayne Lukas	Robert & Christina Baker, et al.	1:40.59
1996	Ordway	John R. Velazquez	David G. Donk	Philip F. DiLeo & William Punk	1:42.09
1995	Maria's Mon	Robbie Davis	Richard Schosberg	Mrs. Morton Rosenthal	1:42.39
1994	Timber Country	Pat Day	D. Wayne Lukas	Gainesway Farm et al.	1:44.01
1993	Dehere	Chris McCarron	Reynaldo H. Nobles	Due Process Stable	1:35.91
1992	Sea Hero	Jerry D. Bailey	MacKenzie Miller	Rokeby Stables	1:34.80
1991	Tri To Watch	Ángel Cordero Jr.	Carl Domino	Fred W. Hooper	1:36.60
1990	Fly So Free	José A. Santos	Flint S. Schulhofer	Thomas Valando	1:35.60
1989	Adjudicating	Jacinto Vásquez	Claude R. McGaughey III	Ogden Mills Phipps	1:37.60
1988	Easy Goer	Pat Day	Claude R. McGaughey III	Ogden Phipps	1:34.80
1987	Forty Niner	Eddie Maple	Woody Stephens	Claiborne Farm	1:36.80
1986	Polish Navy	Randy Romero	Claude R. McGaughey III	Ogden Phipps	1:35.20
1985	Mogambo	Ángel Cordero Jr.	LeRoy Jolley	Peter M. Brant	1:37.20
1984	For Certain Doc	Marcel Zuniga	Thomas DeBonis	Philip C. Chuck	1:49.20
1983	Devil's Bag	Eddie Maple	Woody Stephens	Hickory Tree Stable	1:34.20
1982	Copelan	Jerry D. Bailey	Mitchell Griffin	Fred W. Hooper	1:37.80
1981	Timely Writer	Jeffrey Fell	Dominic Imprescia	Peter Martin	1:36.40
1980	Lord Avie	Jorge Velásquez	Daniel Perlsweig	David Simon	1:37.20
1979	Joanie's Chief	Ruben Hernandez	Eugene Jacobs	Peter Barberino	1:38.20
1978	Spectacular Bid	Jorge Velásquez	Grover G. Delp	Hawksworth Farm (Harry & Teresa Meyerhoff)	1:34.80
1977	Alydar	Jorge Velásquez	John M. Veitch	Calumet Farm	1:36.80
1976	Seattle Slew	Jean Cruguet	William H. Turner Jr.	Karen L. Taylor	1:34.40
1975	Honest Pleasure	Braulio Baeza	LeRoy Jolley	Bertram R. Firestone	1:36.40
1974	Foolish Pleasure	Jacinto Vásquez	LeRoy Jolley	John L. Greer	1:36.00
1973	Protagonist	Angel Santiago	John P. Campo	Elmendorf Farm	1:36.00
1973	Holding Pattern	Michael Miceli	Jerome Sarner Sr.	John Gerbas Jr.	1:36.00
1972	Stop The Music *	John L. Rotz	John M. Gaver Sr.	Greentree Stable	1:35.00
1971	Riva Ridge	Ron Turcotte	Lucien Laurin	Meadow Stable	1:36.40
1970	Limit To Reason *	Jorge Velásquez	Thomas J. Kelly	Brookmeade Stable	1:35.40
1969	Silent Screen	John L. Rotz	J. Bowes Bond	Elberon Farm	1:37.20
1968	Top Knight	Manuel Ycaza	Raymond Metcalf	Steven B. Wilson	1:35.20
1967	Vitriolic	Braulio Baeza	Edward A. Neloy	Ogden Phipps	1:34.60
1966	Successor	Braulio Baeza	Edward A. Neloy	Wheatley Stable	1:35.00
1965	Buckpasser	Braulio Baeza	William C. Winfrey	Ogden Phipps	1:36.40
1964	Bold Lad	Braulio Baeza	William C. Winfrey	Wheatley Stable	1:36.40
1963	Roman Brother	John L. Rotz	Burley Parke	Harbor View Farm	1:38.00
1962	Never Bend	Manuel Ycaza	Woody Stephens	Cain Hoy Stable	1:35.80
1961	Donut Queen	Manuel Ycaza	Ron McAnally	Verne Winchell	1:36.00
1960	Roving Minstrel	Henry Moreno	Burley Parke	Harbor View Farm	1:35.60
1959	Warfare	Ismael Valenzuela	Hack Ross	Bellehurst Stable (Clifton Jones Jr.)	1:35.20
1958	First Landing	Eddie Arcaro	Casey Hayes	Christopher Chenery	1:39.40
1957	Jewel's Reward	Bill Shoemaker	Ivan H. Parke	Maine Chance Farm	1:37.40
1955	Beau Fond	Eddie Arcaro	Daverne Emery	Mrs. Henry H. Hecht	1:36.40
1954	Flying Fury	Henry Moreno	Loyd Gentry Jr.	Cain Hoy Stable	1:37.80
1953	Fisherman	Hedley Woodhouse	Sylvester Veitch	C. V. Whitney	1:38.60
1952	Laffango	Nick Shuk	Merritt A. Buxton	Trio Stable (Jack Liberman & Abe Giddins)	1:38.00
1951	Armageddon	Bill Shoemaker	Moody Jolley	Cain Hoy Stable	1:38.20
1950	Uncle Miltie	Hedley Woodhouse	Andrew C. Colando	Joseph J. Colando	1:36.60
1949	Theory	Steve Brooks	Horace A. Jones	Calumet Farm	1:37.00
1948	Capot	Ted Atkinson	John M. Gaver Sr.	Greentree Stable	1:37.20
1947	Vulcan's Forge	Arnold Kirkland	Sylvester Veitch	C. V. Whitney	1:36.60
1946	Donor	Job Dean Jessop	Preston M. Burch	W. Deering Howe	1:37.40

- In 1970, Hoist The Flag won the race but was disqualified and set back to last.
- In 1972, Secretariat won the race but was disqualified and set back to second.
- Due to a large field, in 1973 the race was run in two divisions.

== Earlier winners ==
- 1945 – Marine Victory
- 1944 – Pot O'Luck
- 1943 – Pukka Gin
- 1942 – Count Fleet
- 1941 – Alsab
- 1940 – Monday Lunch
- 1939 – Andy K.
- 1938 – Porter's Mite
- 1937 – Menow
- 1936 – Privileged
- 1935 – Brevity
- 1934 – Balladier
- 1933 – Hadagal
- 1932 – Dynastic
- 1931 – Sweeping Light
- 1930 – Mate
- 1929 – Whichone
- 1928 – Healy
- 1927 – Oh Say
- 1926 – Valorous
- 1925 – Bubbling Over
- 1924 – Beatrice
- 1923 – Sarazen
- 1922 – Nassau
- 1921 – Surf Rider
- 1920 – Grey Lag
- 1919 – Cleopatra
- 1918 – War Pennant
- 1917 – Lanius
- 1916 – Vivid
- 1915 – Chicle
- 1914 – Paris
- 1913 – Race Not Run
- 1912 – Race Not Run
- 1911 – Race Not Run
- 1910 – Race Not Run
- 1909 – Fauntleroy
- 1908 – Helmet
- 1907 – Colin
- 1906 – Kentucky Beau
- 1905 – Perverse
- 1904 – Oiseau
- 1903 – Stalwart
- 1902 – Meltonian
- 1901 – Endurance by Right
- 1900 – Garry Herrmann
- 1899 – Kilmarnock
- 1898 – Lothario
- 1897 – Plaudit
- 1896 – The Friar
- 1895 – Ben Brush
- 1894 – Salvation
- 1893 – Sir Excess
- 1892 – Ramapo
- 1891 – Azra
- 1890 – Hoodlum
- 1889 – June Day
- 1888 – Radiant
- 1887 – Cascade
- 1886 – Connemarra
- 1885 – Dew Drop
- 1884 – Eachus
- 1883 – Leo
- 1882 – Breeze
- 1881 – Macduff
- 1880 – Lady Rosebery
- 1879 – Carita
- 1878 – Belinda
- 1877 – Albert
- 1876 – Bombast
- 1875 – Virginius
- 1874 – Hyder Ali
- 1873 – Grinstead
- 1872 – Minnie W.
- 1871 – Grey Planet
- 1870 – Madam Dudley
- 1869 – Finesse
- 1868 – Cottrill
- 1867 – Sarah B.

== See also ==
- Road to the Kentucky Derby
