= Proud Accolade =

American Thoroughbred racehorse

Proud Accolade (2002–2009) was an American Thoroughbred racehorse best known for winning the 2004 Champagne Stakes and 2005 Hutcheson Stakes. He was retired in 2005 and humanely euthanized on June 16, 2009 due to a serious neurological disorder. Surgery had been scheduled, but Proud Accolade took a turn for the worse.
