= Dedicate (horse) =

American-bred Thoroughbred racehorse

- Sire: Princequillo
- Grandsire: Prince Rose
- Dam: Dini
- Damsire: John P. Grier
- Sex: Stallion
- Foaled: 1952
- Country: United States
- Colour: Dark Bay/Brown
- Breeder: Claiborne Farm
- Owner: Jan Winfrey Burke
- Trainer: G. Carey Winfrey
- Rider: Bill Hartack
- Record: 43: 12-9-5
- Earnings: $383,765

Major wins
- Delaware Valley Stakes (1955); Jersey Stakes (1955); Brooklyn Handicap (1956); Hawthorne Gold Cup Handicap (1956); Whitney Handicap (1956); John B. Campbell Memorial Handicap (1957); Monmouth Handicap (1957); Woodward Stakes (1957)

Awards
- American Champion Older Male Horse (1957); TRA American Horse of the Year (1957)

Dedicate (1952–1973) was an American Champion Thoroughbred racehorse.

== Background ==
Dedicate was bred in Kentucky by the renowned Claiborne Farm, and owned by Jan Winfrey Burke. His sire was the important Princequillo, a two-time Leading sire in North America and a seven-time Leading broodmare sire in North America. He was trained by Mrs. Burke's father, future U.S. Racing Hall of Fame inductee G. Carey Winfrey.

== Racing career ==
Racing at age two to four Dedicate won several important races including the Brooklyn and Whitney Handicaps. However, at age five he was a major force in American racing, and his 1957 performances earned him American Champion Older Male Horse honors. He was controversially named Horse of The Year by the TRA after finishing third to Bold Ruler and Gallant Man in the rival DRF poll. Bold Ruler was also preferred in a poll conducted by Turf and Sport Digest magazine.

== Stud record ==
Retired to stud, Dedicate sired a number of winners including Smart Deb, the 1962 Co-Champion 2-Two-Year-Old Filly and the multiple stakes-winning filly, Natashka. Loripori won against 2 and 3 year old fillies in Mexico, and he stood in Mexico for two seasons with Small Crops. Dedicate died in 1973 due to a heart attack whilst jogging in his paddock.
