= Gilded Time =

American-bred Thoroughbred racehorse

- Sire: Timeless Moment
- Grandsire: Damascus
- Dam: Gilded Lilly
- Damsire: What a Pleasure
- Sex: Stallion
- Foaled: February 6, 1990; Ocala, Florida, U.S.
- Died: December 7, 2021 (aged 31); Alberta, Canada
- Country: United States
- Colour: Chestnut
- Breeder: Harry T. Mangurian Jr.
- Owner: David Milch, Jack & Mark Silverman
- Trainer: Darrell Vienna
- Record: 6: 4-0-1
- Earnings: $975,980

Major wins
- Sapling Stakes (1992); Arlington-Washington Futurity (1992) Breeders' Cup wins: Breeders' Cup Juvenile (1992)

Awards
- American Champion Two-Year-Old Colt (1992)
- Last updated on October 6, 2007

Gilded Time (6 February 1990 — 7 December 2021) was an American Thoroughbred racehorse and sire. He was a leading American two-year-old in 1992, and at the end of the season was voted American Champion Two-Year-Old Colt at the Eclipse Awards. His subsequent racing career was curtailed by injury.

== Background ==
Bred by Harry T. Mangurian Jr., he was out of the mare Gilded Lilly and sired by Timeless Moment, a son of the U.S. Racing Hall of Fame inductee, Damascus. He was purchased at auction for $80,000 by the partnership of Jack & Mark Silverman and television writer/producer David Milch and sent into training with Darrell Vienna.

== Racing career ==
Gilded Time began racing at age two. After winning his maiden race in July at Hollywood Park in Arcadia, California, under regular jockey Chris McCarron he won the Sapling Stakes at Monmouth Park in Oceanport, New Jersey and the Arlington-Washington Futurity at Arlington Park in Chicago, Illinois. He was then sent off as the betting favorite in the Breeders' Cup Juvenile at Gulfstream Park in Hallandale Beach, Florida. Gilded Time's win in the Juvenile left him undefeated in his four 1992 races and earned him that year's Eclipse Award for American Champion Two-Year-Old Colt.

Gilded Time was scheduled to compete in the 1993 San Rafael Stakes and the Santa Anita Derby before the U.S. Triple Crown series. in January 1993 Gilded Time bruised his left front foot during a workout at his home base at Santa Anita Park. The injury did not heal satisfactorily and in March his handlers announced that because of the injury he would not be able to run in the Kentucky Derby and would be out of racing indefinitely. The colt did not race in 1993 until November 6 when he ran third to Cardmania in the Breeders' Cup Sprint. His next start, and last of his career, came in late December in the Malibu Stakes at Santa Anita Park where he finished sixth.

== Stud record ==
Syndicated and retired from racing, Gilded Time was sent to stud duty at the Vinery Kentucky. He was later moved to the Bar None Ranch in Alberta, Canada. His best winners include Gayego (Ancient Title Stakes) and Elloluv (Ashland Stakes) He died 6 December 2021 at Bar None Ranch.
