= Vulcan's Forge (horse) =

American-bred Thoroughbred racehorse

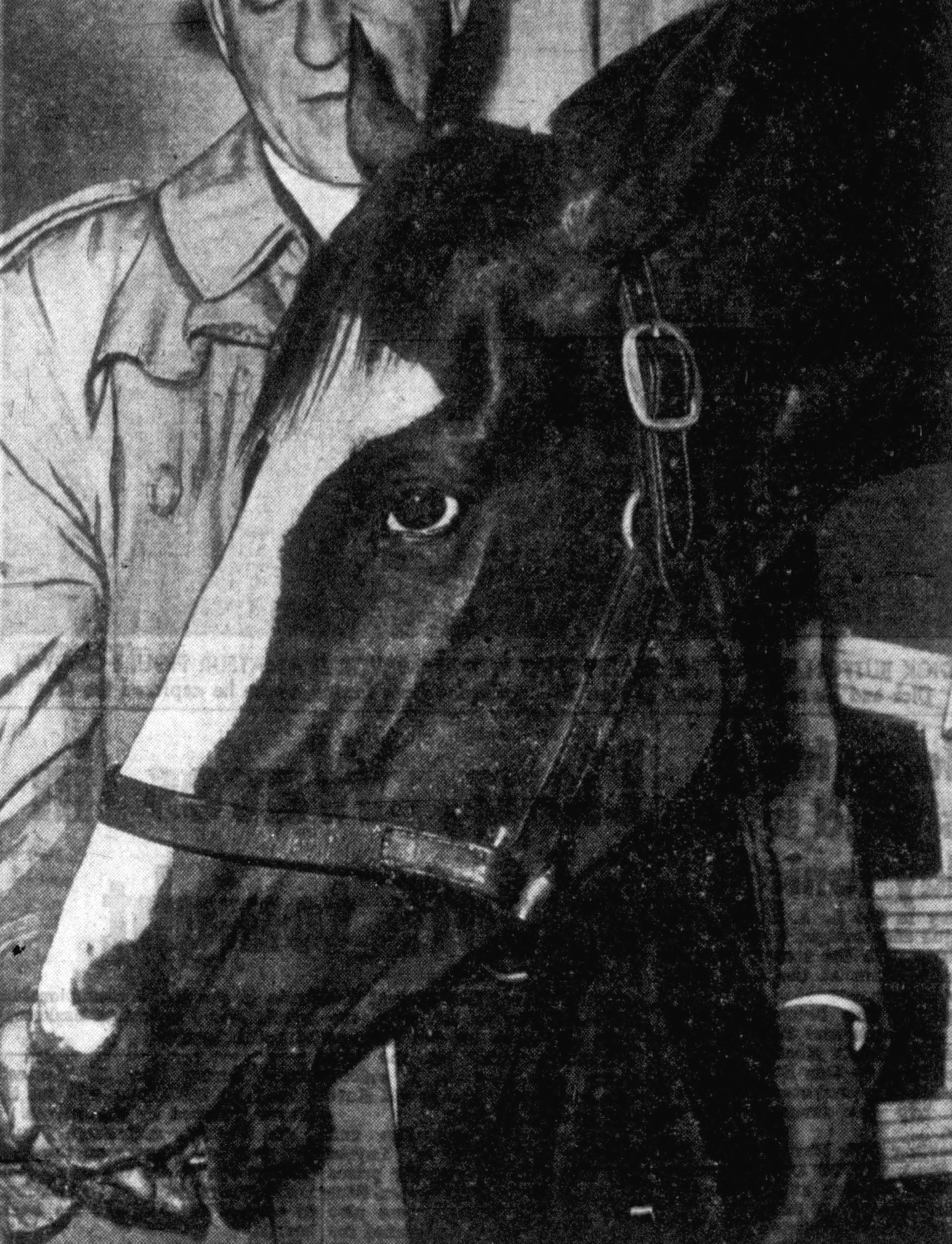
- Vulcan's Forge, circa 1949
- Sire: Mahmoud
- Grandsire: Blenheim
- Dam: Burning Bright
- Damsire: Whichone
- Sex: Stallion
- Foaled: 1945
- Country: United States
- Color: Chestnut
- Breeder: Cornelius Vanderbilt Whitney
- Owner: 1) Cornelius Vanderbilt Whitney; 2) Isaac J. Collins
- Trainer: 1) Sylvester Veitch; 2) Don Cameron
- Record: 50: 9-11-6
- Earnings: US$324,240

Major wins
- Champagne Stakes (1947); Withers Stakes (1948); Providence Stakes (1948); Michigan Governor's Handicap (1949); Santa Anita Handicap (1949); Suburban Handicap (1949)

Vulcan's Forge (1945–1951) was an American Thoroughbred racehorse who won the 1947 Champagne Stakes as a two-year-old, the 1948 Withers Stakes, and in 1949 the prestigious Santa Anita and Suburban Handicaps.

As a three-year-old in 1948, Vulcan's Forge ran in two of the U.S. Triple Crown races. He did not compete in the Kentucky Derby but finished second in the Preakness Stakes and fourth in the Belmont Stakes. On September 30, 1948, owner C. V. Whitney sold the colt for $80,000 through a Belmont Park auction to Isaac Collins.

On April 14, 1951, while at the Frances Keller Stables at Santa Anita Park in Arcadia, California, Vulcan's Forge fell ill with colic and died.
