= New England Oaks =

American Thoroughbred stakes horse race

- Class: Discontinued stakes
- Location: Narragansett Park, Pawtucket, Rhode Island; United States
- Inaugurated: 1936
- Race type: Thoroughbred - Flat racing

Race information
- Distance: 1 1/16 miles (8.5 furlongs)
- Surface: Dirt
- Track: left-handed
- Qualification: Three-year-old fillies

The New England Oaks was an American Thoroughbred horse race held annually from 1936 thru 1944 at Narragansett Park in Pawtucket, Rhode Island. Run on dirt over a distance of a mile and one-sixteenth, like all "Oaks" races for Thoroughbreds, it was open to three-year-old fillies only.

== Historical Notes ==
Fully one-third of all winners of the New England Oaks would finish the year as the American Champion Three-Year-Old Filly.

- 1) Under jockey Irving Anderson, High Fleet won the September 5, 1936 inaugural running of the New England Oaks. The George D. Widener Jr. filly, trained by U.S. Racing Hall of Fame inductee Bert Mulholland, would be voted the 1936 American Champion Three-Year-Old Filly.
- 2) Ridden by future Hall of Fame jockey Jack Westrope for the Brookmeade Stable of Isabel Dodge Sloane, Handcuff won the 1938 edition of the New England Oaks. Her time of 1:43 3/5 was just 1/5 of a second off the track record and would turn out to be the best in the Oaks history. Handcuff would earn that year's American Champion Three-Year-Old Filly honors.
- 3) Following her win in the 1943 Oaks, The Boston Globe story on the race results said that "Stefanita just about clinched her claim to the 3-year-old filly championship of the 1943 racing season," which she did.

In 1945 there was no running of the New England Oaks. With wartime gasoline rationing in place nationwide, travel to the racetrack was basically limited to Pawtucket residents. The other side of the coin was that locals could not go away for summer vacation or visits and local entertainment venues benefited from increased attendance. In some instances the wartime restrictions led to facilities shutting down such as Delaware Park did for all of 1944. Attracting owners and trainers from around the country to send their horses to compete in feature events became difficult for the smaller out-of-the-way tracks. Such was the case when Narragansett Park had to drop the New England Futurity after its 1940 running.

== Records ==
Speed record:

- 1:43.60 @ 1-1/16 miles: Handcuff (1938)

Most wins by a jockey:

- No jockey won this race more than once.

Most wins by a trainer:

- 2 - Bert Mulholland (1936, 1943)

Most wins by an owner:

- 2 - George D. Widener Jr. (1936, 1943)
- 2 - George M. Odom (1938, 1941)

== Winners ==
| Year | Winner | Age | Jockey | Trainer | Owner | Dist. (Miles) | Time | Win$ |
|---|---|---|---|---|---|---|---|---|
| 1944 | Whirlabout | 3 | Herb Lindberg | George M. Odom | Louis B. Mayer | 1-1/16 m | 1:46.00 | $7,120 |
| 1943 | Stefanita | 3 | Conn McCreary | Bert Mulholland | George D. Widener Jr. | 1-1/16 m | 1:46.00 | $7,980 |
| 1942 | Spiral Pass | 3 | Warren E. Snyder | Johnny McDowell | Mt. Desert Stable (W. E. Parker) | 1-1/16 m | 1:44.60 | $8,900 |
| 1941 | Imperatrice | 3 | Thomas May | George M. Odom | William H. LaBoyteaux | 1-1/16 m | 1:45.60 | $9,660 |
| 1940 | Shine O'Night | 3 | Ray Adair | William F. Tucker | W. Campbell Hobson | 1-1/16 m | 1:47.20 | $5,010 |
| 1939 | Bala Ormont | 3 | Carroll Bierman | John Hanover | Harry Friedberg & E. D. Axton | 1-1/16 m | 1:45.40 | $7,215 |
| 1938 | Handcuff | 3 | Jack Westrope | Hugh L. Fontaine | Brookmeade Stable | 1-1/16 m | 1:43.60 | $4,940 |
| 1937 | Savage Beauty | 3 | Joe Wagner | Louis J. Schaefer | William L. Brann | 1-1/16 m | 1:45.20 | $4,050 |
| 1936 | High Fleet | 3 | Irving Anderson | Bert Mulholland | George D. Widener Jr. | 1-1/16 m | 1:44.00 | $4,830 |
