= Menow =

American-bred Thoroughbred racehorse

- Sire: Pharamond
- Grandsire: Phalaris
- Dam: Alcibiades
- Damsire: Supremus
- Sex: Stallion
- Foaled: 1935
- Country: United States
- Colour: Bay
- Breeder: Hal Price Headley
- Owner: Hal Price Headley
- Trainer: Duval A. Headley
- Record: 17: 7-3-3
- Earnings: US$140,100

Major wins
- Champagne Stakes (1937); Belmont Futurity Stakes (1937); Withers Stakes (1938); Massachusetts Handicap (1938); Potomac Handicap (1938)

Awards
- American Champion Two-Year-Old Male Horse (1937)

Menow (1935–1964) was an American Thoroughbred racehorse. He won several important races in 1937, when he was voted American Champion Two-Year-Old Male Horse.

== Background ==
Bred and raced by Hal Price Headley, Menow was foaled on May 19, late in the year for a Thoroughbred racehorse. His dam was Headley's Alcibiades, who was the U.S. Champion two-year-old filly of 1929 and the Champion three-year-old filly of 1930.

Menow's English-born sire, Pharamond, was owned and raced by Lord Derby, who sold him in 1928 to an American syndicate led by Hal Price Headley. He was registered in the United States as Pharamond II. Headley brought him to stand at stud at his Beaumont Farm in Lexington Kentucky. He was trained by Hal Price Headley's nephew, Duval.

== Racing career ==
As a two-year-old, Menow won the 1937 Champagne Stakes in September, although most attention was given to the favorite Skylarking who was put down after his leg snapped. In October, Menow set a world record for six-and-one-half furlongs on a straight dirt course in winning the Belmont Futurity Stakes by four lengths. His 1937 performances earned him American Champion Two-Year-Old Male Horse honors.

In 1938, Menow finished third in the Kentucky Derby to Lawrin and third to Dauber in the Preakness Stakes. His handlers then skipped the much longer Belmont Stakes. In July, Menow won the mile-and-an-eighth Massachusetts Handicap by nine lengths, defeating 1937 Triple Crown champion War Admiral. His other wins included the one mile Withers Stakes at New York's Aqueduct Racetrack and the mile-and-a-sixteenth Potomac Handicap at Havre de Grace Racetrack in Havre de Grace, Maryland. Menow ended his career having bowed in both forelegs while finishing third to Seabiscuit in the Havre de Grace Handicap.

== Stud record ==
Retired to stand at stud for the 1939 season at his owner's Beaumont Farm in Kentucky, Menow proved a successful sire, getting thirty-two stakes winners including:

- Capot (b. 1946) - won 1949 Preakness and Belmont Stakes. Co-American Horse of the Year (1949)
- Ruhe (b. 1948) - won Arkansas Derby, Blue Grass Stakes, Equipoise Mile Handicap, Forerunner Stakes, Hawthorne Juvenile Stakes
- Tom Fool (b. 1949) - American Horse of the Year (1953), U.S. Racing Hall of Fame inductee
- Askmenow (b. 1940) - American Champion Two-Year-Old Filly (1942). Won Selima Stakes, Pimlico Oaks, Arlington Matron Handicap and defeated colts in the 1943 American Derby

Menow was also the damsire of High Voltage, the 1954 American Champion Two-Year-Old Filly.

Menow died at age twenty-nine in 1964 and is buried at Mill Ridge Farm in Lexington. Built on a parcel from Beaumont Farm, Mill Ridge was owned by Hal Price Headley's daughter Alice Headley Chandler and her husband, John.
