= Eugene A. Rodriguez =

Eugene Rodriguez
Personal information
- Born: November 14, 1916 Matanzas, Cuba
- Died: October 23, 1996 (aged 79)
- Occupation: Jockey

Horse racing career
- Sport: Horse racing
- Career wins: Not found

Major racing wins
- Del Mar Handicap (1940); Hollywood Derby (1940); La Jolla Handicap (1940); Santa Catalina Nursery Stakes (1940); Narragansett Special (1950); Providence Stakes (1952); Bahamas Stakes (1956); Grey Handicap (1956); Shady Well Stakes (1956); Seagram Cup (1956); Breeders' Stakes (1956); Marine Stakes (1957); Vandal Stakes (1958); Woodbine Oaks (1958)

Honours
- Oriental Park Racetrack Hall of Fame (1980)

Significant horses
- Canadian Champ, Crafty Admiral

Eugene A. Rodriguez (November 14, 1916 – October 23, 1996) was a Cuban-born jockey in American Thoroughbred horse racing.

Born in Matanzas, Cuba, Rodriguez began his career in racing at Oriental Park in Havana, a racetrack which in 1980 would induct him in their Hall of Fame. After emigrating to the United States, he competed at racetracks in California where he won a riding title at Del Mar Racetrack in 1940. He went on to race in New York State, New Jersey, Florida as well as in Toronto, Ontario, Canada during the latter part of the 1950s. In Toronto he won a number of stakes races at Woodbine Racetrack and the autumn 1956 riding title at Greenwood Raceway.

Rodriguez notably was aboard the future Canadian Horse Racing Hall of Fame colt Canadian Champ for his wins in the 1956 Seagram Cup and the Breeders' Stakes.
