= Imperatrice =

American-bred Thoroughbred racehorse

- Sire: Caruso
- Grandsire: Polymelian
- Dam: Cinquepace
- Damsire: Brown Bud
- Sex: Mare
- Foaled: 1938
- Country: United States
- Color: Dark bay/brown
- Breeder: William H. LaBoyteaux
- Owner: William H. LaBoyteaux (to 1947); Meadow Farm (after 1947)
- Trainer: George M. Odom
- Record: 31: 11-7-2
- Earnings: $37,255

Major wins
- New England Oaks (1941); New Rochelle Handicap (1941); Test Stakes (1941); Fall Highweight Handicap (1942)

Imperatrice (May 26, 1938 – August 9, 1972) was an American Thoroughbred racehorse and broodmare. She was the dam of Somethingroyal and second dam of the 1973 U.S. Triple Crown champion and Hall of Fame inductee Secretariat (by Bold Ruler).

A bay mare, Imperatrice was bred in New Jersey by William H. LaBoyteaux, president of Johnson & Higgins. He died in 1947 and his horses were all sold by the executors of the LaBoyteaux Estate. Imperatrice was purchased for $30,000 by Christopher Chenery's and spent the remainder of her life at his Meadow Stud in Virginia. Trained for LaBoyteaux by George M. Odom, she raced 31 times with 11 wins, 7 shows, and 2 places. Some of her winning efforts included the New England Oaks, New Rochelle Handicap, the Test Stakes, and the Fall Highweight Handicap.

She was pensioned after being reported barren in 1962. Imperatrice lived to the age of 34 before being euthanized due to age-related urinal and digestive complications. She was the dam of winners Imperial Hill (Hill Prince), Scattered (Whirlaway), Speedwell (Bold Ruler), Squared Away2 (Piping Rock) and was the third dam of successful New York sire Cure the Blues (through daughter Speedwell). Her daughter Scattered (April 15, 1945 - January 18, 1979) also lived nearly as long.

== Influence ==
Imperatrice's influence is not limited only to Thoroughbreds, but also extends to Quarter Horses as well, as Imperatrice is the fourth dam of Quarter Horse Dash For Cash through daughter Scattered.

Imperatrice is considered to be a Reines-de-Course.

== Breeding ==
Pedigree of Imperatrice
Sire Caruso	Polymelian	Polymelus	Cyllene
Sire Caruso	Polymelian	Polymelus	Maid Marion
Sire Caruso	Polymelian	Pasquita	Sundridge
Sire Caruso	Polymelian	Pasquita	Pasquil
Sire Caruso	Sweet Music	Harmonicon	Disguise
Sire Caruso	Sweet Music	Harmonicon	Harpsicord
Sire Caruso	Sweet Music	Ivette	Isinglass
Sire Caruso	Sweet Music	Ivette	Brielle
Dam Cinquepace	Brown Bud	Brown Prince	Dark Ronald
Dam Cinquepace	Brown Bud	Brown Prince	Excellenza
Dam Cinquepace	Brown Bud	June Rose	Myram
Dam Cinquepace	Brown Bud	June Rose	Pietra
Dam Cinquepace	Assignation	Teddy	Ajax
Dam Cinquepace	Assignation	Teddy	Rondeau
Dam Cinquepace	Assignation	Cinq A Sept	Roi Herode
Dam Cinquepace	Assignation	Cinq A Sept	Rackety Coo
