= Rockhill Native =

American-bred Thoroughbred racehorse

- Sire: Our Native
- Grandsire: Exclusive Native
- Dam: Beanery
- Damsire: Cavan
- Sex: Gelding
- Foaled: March 26, 1977
- Country: United States
- Colour: Chestnut
- Breeder: Dr. E. W. Thomas & Carolaine Farm
- Owner: Harry A. Oak
- Trainer: Herbert Stevens
- Record: 17: 10-2-3
- Earnings: US$ 465,122

Major wins
- Cowdin Stakes (1979); Jefferson Cup Stakes (1979); Futurity Stakes (1979); Sapling Stakes (1979)

Awards
- American Champion Two-Year-Old Colt (1979)

Rockhill Native (1977–2009) was an American Thoroughbred racehorse that was the 1979 American champion two-year-old colt.

Rockhill Native won the Cowdin, Futurity and Sapling Stakes as a two-year-old in 1979 and also won the Jefferson Cup for his owner Harry A. Oak. Rockhill Native did not run the 1980 Preakness Stakes, ran fifth in the Kentucky Derby and third in the Belmont Stakes. He was first in the 1979 Hopeful Stakes, but was disqualified and pushed to sixth place for interference. Rockhill Native injured his tendon after the Belmont Stakes and was permanently retired from racing in April 1981.

Rockhill Native died on March 19, 2009, at the age of 32 at Louis Haggin III's Sycamore Farm near Lexington, Kentucky. He was being cared for by Don Robinson of Winter Quarter Farm. He is buried next to his dam, Beanery, and Zenyatta's granddam, For the Flag.
