= Pic's Peanut Butter =

New Zealand peanut butter manufacturer

- Type: Private
- Industry: Food manufacturing
- Founded: 2007
- Founder: Pic Picot
- Headquarters: Nelson, New Zealand,
- Key people: Pic Picot (founder); Aimee McCammon (CEO)
- Products: Peanut butter, nut-based spreads
- Owner: Scalzo Food Industries; Pic Picot; Aimee McCammon
- Website: www.picspeanutbutter.com

Pic's Peanut Butter is a New Zealand food manufacturer headquartered in Nelson. Founded in 2007 by Pic Picot, the company produces peanut butter and nut-based spreads for retail and food service markets in New Zealand and internationally. As of 2025, Pic's Peanut Butter holds a 41% share of the New Zealand peanut butter market, making it the country's largest brand in the category.

== History ==
Pic's Peanut Butter was established in Nelson in 2007. Production began in a residential garage, where peanuts were roasted in a modified stainless-steel concrete mixer before being processed and packaged for sale.

Pic's products expanded from farmers' markets into national supermarket distribution and later into international markets, including China in 2015 and Chinese supermarkets two years later.

In the 2018 New Year Honours, Pic Picot was appointed a Member of the New Zealand Order of Merit, for services to business.

In 2025, in a multimillion-dollar transaction, Melbourne-based food distributor Scalzo Food Industries acquired a majority (51.3%) stake in Pic's Peanut Butter, with founder Pic Picot retaining a 42.4% share of the company and remaining involved as brand ambassador. The remaining shares are held by Aimee McCammon, the company's CEO and Picot's stepdaughter.

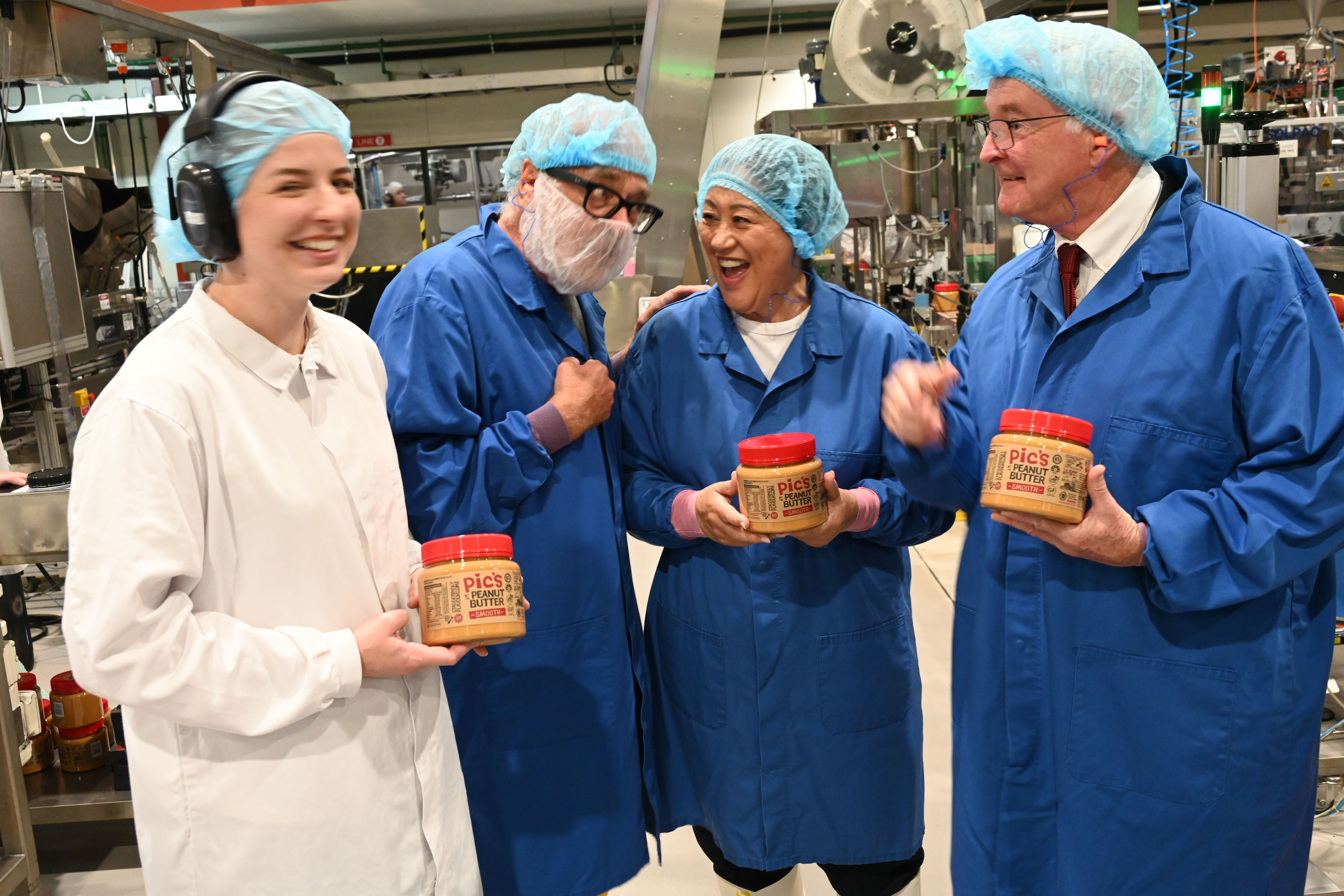
Vice-regal visit to the Pic's factory on 27 March 2026, with the company's founder, Pic Picot (second from left), the governor-general, Dame Cindy Kiro (second from right), and vice-regal consort Richard Davies (right)

== Products ==
Pic's Peanut Butter produces smooth, crunchy, smoochy and no-added-salt varieties. In 2020, Pic's partnered with Whittaker's to release a co-branded peanut and chocolate spread.

In 2018, Pic's introduced a Māori-language label, "Pata Pīnati Kakukaku", for Māori Language Week. The label was reissued in 2025 to coincide with the 50th anniversary of Te Wiki o te Reo Māori, with the product available in supermarkets nationwide during September 2025 and year-round through the company's website. Pic Picot later described the label as part of the company's efforts to support the everyday use of te reo Māori through consumer products.

Pic's Peanut Butter is the largest peanut butter brand in New Zealand by market share, holding 41% of the category as of 2025, with annual sales of $40 million.
