= Narragansett Park =

Rhode Island Thoroughbred track (1934–1978)

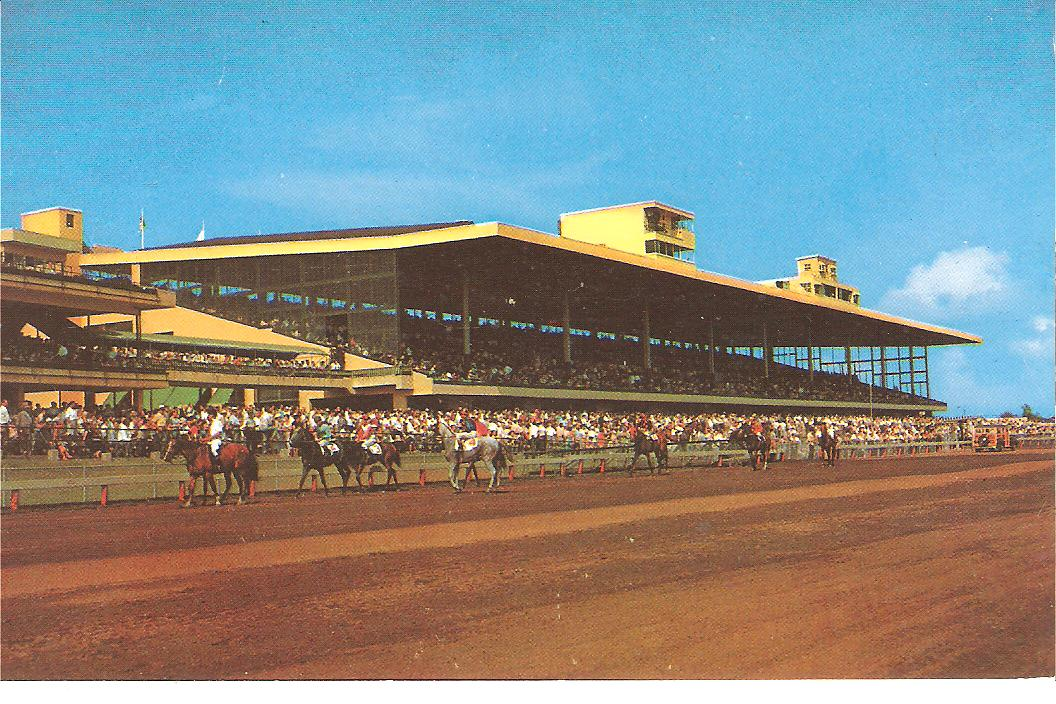
- Narragansett Park "Post Card" photo circa 1950s.
- Interactive map of Narragansett Park
- Location: Pawtucket, Rhode Island
- Coordinates: 41°51′40″N 71°20′45″W
- Date opened: August 1, 1934; 92 years ago
- Date closed: September 4, 1978; 48 years ago
- Race type: Thoroughbred racing
- Course type: Flat
- Notable races: Narragansett Special; Roger Williams Handicap; Providence Stakes; Rhode Island Handicap; New England Futurity; New England Oaks

Narragansett Park was an American race track (1934–1978) for Thoroughbred horse racing in Pawtucket, Rhode Island that took its name from a defunct trotting park that had existed in Cranston, Rhode Island at the turn of the previous century.

== Beginnings ==
On May 18, 1934, Rhode Island voters approved a measure legalizing parimutuel betting by a better than 4 to 1 margin (60,539 for and 12,665 against). The following day, the Narragansett Racing Association announced plans for a $1 million race track at the site of the former What Cheer Airport on the Pawtucket/East Providence line. The NRA then filed articles of incorporation with the Secretary of State of Rhode Island. The Association chose to name their track after Narragansett Park, a former turn-of-the-century trotting park in Cranston, Rhode Island. On June 6, 1934, the Narragansett Racing Association was awarded the state's first horse racing permit. Construction was completed on an expedited schedule in less than two months at a cost of $1.2 million. The track consisted of a one-mile racing oval, a 14,000 seat grandstand, 270 betting and paying booths, a clubhouse, and 22 barns with stalls that could hold more than 1,000 horses. The City of Pawtucket constructed a new four-lane highway leading from Newport Avenue to the entrance of the track. A double track railway spur was also built leading into the grandstand.

Narragansett Park opened on August 1, 1934, with "the paint still wet" and 37,281 people in attendance, including Jack Dempsey, Cornelius Vanderbilt Whitney, Alfred Gwynne Vanderbilt Jr., and Jesse H. Metcalf. The track's first card consisted of eight races. The feature race was the Narragansett Handicap a $5,000 added six furlongs sprint for three-year-olds and up won by Chinese Empress, a three-year-old chestnut filly. The mutuel handle for the day was $351,482. Grandstand admission was $1.00 and the Clubhouse charged $2.50. Racing programs that listed all the basic information for a day at the races were 10 cents. Yearly membership was available for the Terrace Club which featured fine dining on the second floor of the Clubhouse and offered a sweeping view looking out from the beginning of the first turn. The first meet was scheduled to run from August 1 to September 3. On Labor Day 1934 the track drew an estimated 53,922 patrons, the most for any sporting event in the history of Rhode Island. In the feature race that day, the Rhode Island Handicap, Discovery won and set a new World Record for 1 3/16 miles in the time of 1:55. A second fall meet was run from October 5 to November 3 and was just as popular.

During its early years, Narragansett Park was one of the most financially successful tracks in the country. From the time it opened to September 30, 1936, it posted a net profit of $2,017,381.54. In 1934 Rhode Island received over $800,000 in revenue from the track, which was more than 10% of the state's entire budget. Narragansett also became known as somewhat of a “High Society” due to its proximity to Newport, Rhode Island – the summer resort of many wealthy owners from New York City. The track was frequented by celebrities, including Cab Calloway, Jimmy Durante, Babe Ruth, Lou Gehrig, Mickey Rooney, and Milton Berle among others. For decades, the track received patrons from Boston and Connecticut via the New Haven Railroad. During the racing season, daily trains, known as "'Gansett Specials" ran from Boston's South Station to the station tracks at Naragansett Park. The trains left Boston around noon to arrive in time for the first race and returned following the last race.

Narragansett Park was part of many horse racing innovations. The track was one of the first in the country to install a photo finish camera and a starting gate. It was also one of the first to institute a $1,000 minimum purse.

On June 22, 1935, starting for the eighteenth time, Seabiscuit broke his maiden at Narragansett and equaled the five-furlong track record. Four days later in the Watch Hill Claiming Stakes he once again broke the track record, this time by a full second. In 1937, Seabiscuit finished third in the Narragansett Special on a sloppy track which he did not appreciate. The loss ended a streak of seven consecutive stakes wins for Seabiscuit, one shy of fellow future Hall of Famer Discovery's record at the time. In total, Seabiscuit ran 7 times at Gansett with 3 wins.

== The race track war ==
In the summer of 1937, track president Walter E. O'Hara got into an altercation with the state racing steward. The state Horse Racing Division ordered that O'Hara be removed as a track official of the race track for intimidating and interfering with the steward. The Horse Racing Division also ordered an audit of the Narragansett Racing Association's books. This resulted in six new charges against the track with the revocation its license for the fall racing season. O'Hara responded to the charges in his newspaper, the Providence Star-Tribune, in an article which he implied that Governor Robert E. Quinn was or would end up in Butler Hospital, a psychiatric hospital that specialized in mental health treatment.

On September 15, 1937, the Rhode Island Supreme Court unanimously decided to quash the division's order to remove O'Hara. However, Quinn filed two charges with the division seeking O'Hara's removal as a track official and the revocation of the Narragansett Racing Association's license for O'Hara's attacks in the newspaper. The division sided with the Governor and ordered O'Hara's removal and indefinitely suspended the track's license at the end of the summer races. The summer racing season ended on September 30, 1937, however, and the track did not remove O'Hara. The RI Supreme Court stopped the division's order to remove O'Hara and suspend the track's license. Quinn then refused to permit racing at the track. On October 17, Quinn declared that Narragansett Park was "in a state of insurrection," and ordered the National Guard to enforce martial law. O'Hara, who was in Maryland on business, flew back to Rhode Island and was escorted by guardsmen to his penthouse on the track's roof.

Finally on February 9, 1938, sheriff's deputies entered Narragansett Racing Association' and seized records on order of the Superior Court. The luckless O'Hara rolled snake-eyes and ultimately resigned as the association's president and managing director after negotiating a buyout of his contract for $25k and a $100k insurance policy . He was succeeded by track secretary James Dooley.

The "Race Track War" was over.

== Reopening ==
The track reopened in 1938 and attracted the same huge crowds it drew before the "war". It also continued to draw top quality horses from the countries top owners and trainers.. In its heyday, the track conducted races in which numerous Thoroughbred greats and consensus Champions competed. The names such as, Equipoise, Challedon, Discovery, War Admiral, Seabiscuit, Stagehand, Armed and Coaltown ring like a virtual Who's Who for horse racing in the 1930s and '40s. They all ran at the track they called "'Gansett".

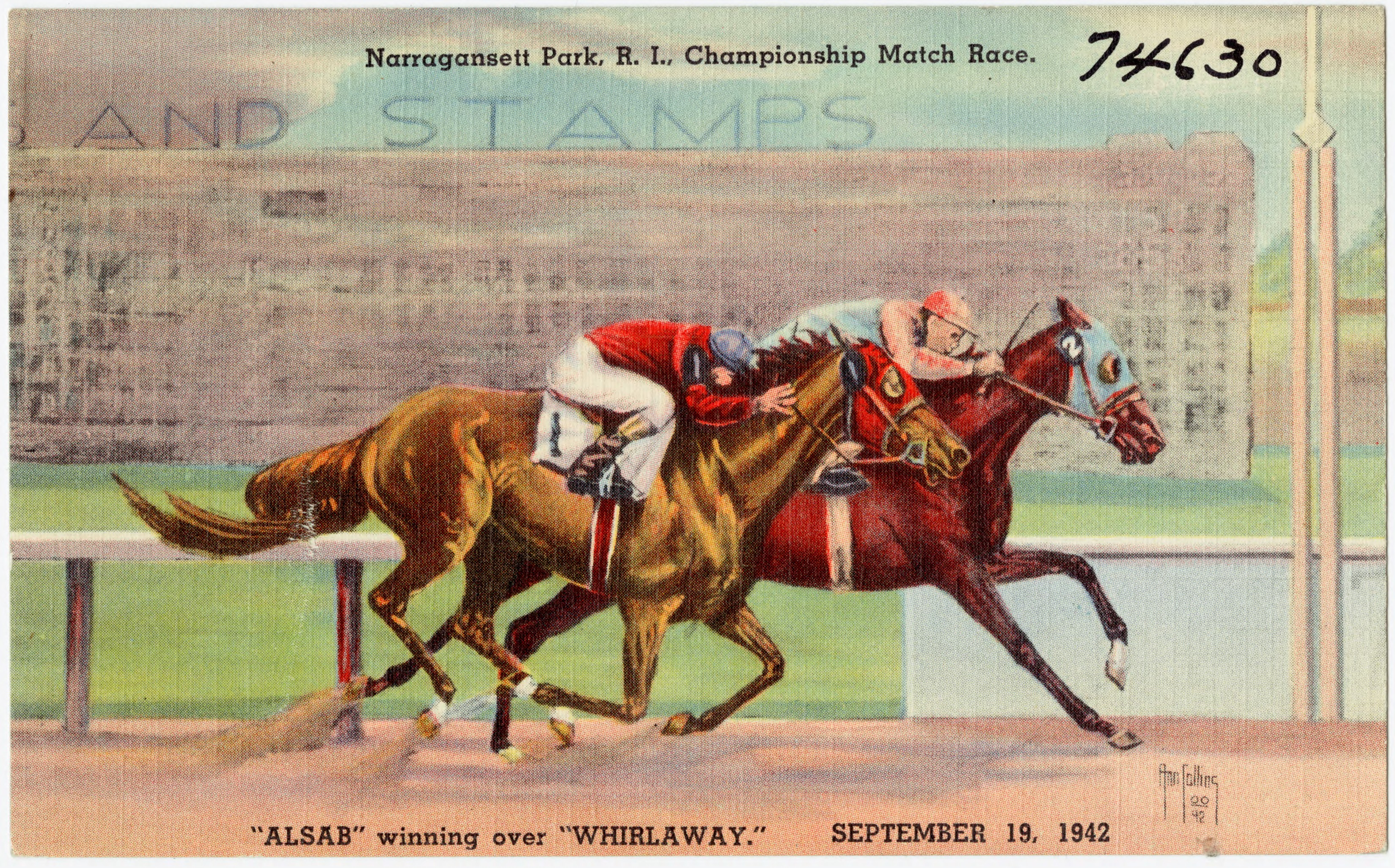
Postcard of Alsab and Whirlaway

On September 19, 1942, the track hosted a match race between Triple Crown winner Whirlaway and 1942 Preakness Stakes winner Alsab. The race was organized after members of the media accused track president James Dooley of concealing the fact that Alsab would not run against Whirlaway in the September 12 Narragansett Special until after a large crowd had come to the track. The race was attended by 35,000 people and all three major radio networks provided live coverage. Whirlaway entered the $25,000 match race a 3 to 10 favorite, while Alsab went off at 8 to 5.

Alsab jumped out to an early lead, holding as much as a two and a half length lead at one point. Whirlaway twice tried to move ahead of Alsab (once as they neared the far turn and once as the two horses entered the backstretch). However, both times jockey Carroll Bierman kept Alsab in front. Halfway through the stretch turn, jockey George Woolf turned Whirlway loose. Whirlway's late charge resulted in a photo finish, however Alsab held on to win the race by a desperate nose. The race is considered to be one of the greatest in New England racing history.

In 1949 Ponder became the last of four Kentucky Derby winners to run at Gansett when the three year old from Calumet Farm ran third in that years Narragansett Special.

== Later years ==
The track began a slow decline in the 1950s, however five champion horses appeared at the track during that decade. Misty Morn, the 1955 3-Year old Filly Champion/Handicap Mare, had her first stakes win versus unrestricted three–year–olds in the that years Providence Stakes.

On October 9, 1960, two of the track's barns burned down. Many horses fled the barns and ran into neighboring yards and streets. On December 10, 1960, the patriarch and president of Narraganset Park, James "Judge" Dooley, died. Betting handles decreased rapidly at this point in time.

By the 1970s the track had fallen upon hard times. Due to reduced public interest in thoroughbred racing, competition for racing dates with other New England tracks, and competition from greyhound racing and state lotteries for gambling dollars the attendance dropped. This led to an inability to attract high-quality horses. The physical condition of the track deteriorated due to lack of upkeep. There was also another major fire in the backstretch barn area. On Labor Day 1978, only 2,882 patrons paid to gain admittance for the last day of racing. Two days later it was announced the track would close.

On September 2, 1977, the Beach Boys performed at Narragansett Park before an audience of 40,000, which remains the largest concert audience in Rhode Island history. In 2017, music historians Al Gomes and Connie Watrous of Big Noise were successful in getting the stretch of street where the concert stage stood (at 510 Narragansett Park Drive) renamed as 'Beach Boys Way.'

== Closure ==
On June 29, 1979, the stockholders of Narragansett Park voted to sell the track to the City of Pawtucket for $5.6 million. The city used a grant from the United States Department of Housing and Urban Development to buy and improve the land, which they sold to developers below market value to stimulate employment and business investment.

On May 30, 1981, the clubhouse was destroyed by a suspicious fire. The only remaining part of the track is an office building with stairs leading to the former jockey room and the grandstand with the upper roof removed. In past years it housed the Narragansett Flea Market and later a Building 19 store.

Some old artifacts, such as tote boards and stairwells that end abruptly, still remain in the old grandstand. Three roads, Seabiscuit Place, War Admiral Place and Whirlaway Place, now exist just north of the old facility where one of the parking lots once extended to, and speak of a long gone past.

== Record holders ==
| Distance | Winner | Age | Weight | Date | Record |
| 4F | Wicked Time | 2 | 106 | 5/6/37 | :47 2/5 |
| 4.5F | Jackie D. | 2 | 109 | 5/7/36 | :52 2/5 |
| 5F* | Martha Belle | 4 | 113 | 6/9/73 | :58 2/5 |
| 5F* | Always Sure | 5 | 117 | 2/5/68 | :58 2/5 |
| 5.5F | Measurator | 3 | 117 | 8/4/75 | 1:04 1/5 |
| 6F | Blue Wayne | 3 | 114 | 12/4/54 | 1:09 1/5 |
| 1 Mile* | Lady Reigh | 3 | 103 | 10/9/34 | 1:37 |
| 1 Mile* | Advising Anna | 5 | 105 | 8/12/35 | 1:37 |
| 1 M 70 yds | Tim B. Quiet | 4 | 113 | 12/2/71 | 1:40 1/5 |
| 1 1/16 M | Isle of Bond | 4 | 119 | 12/4/54 | 1:42 1/5 |
| 1 1/8 M | Valdina Orphan | 3 | 115 | 9/26/42 | 1:49 1/5 |
| 1 3/16 M | Lucky Draw | 5 | 123 | 9/14/46 | 1:54 3/5 {WR} |
| 1 1/4 M | Chief Mourner | 3 | 102 1/2 | 11/1/35 | 2:06 3/5 |
| 1 1/2 M | Uncle Don | 7 | 115 | 12/4/54 | 2:31 1/5 |
| 1 5/8 M | Satin Cap | 5 | 116 | 9/22/42 | 2:46 1/5 |
| 1 M 5.5 F | Avenue O. | 3 | 113 | 11/18/61 | 2:58 3/5 |
| 1 3/4 M | Yukon | 6 | 108 | 9/26/45 | 2:58 2/5 |
| 2 Mile | Joe Sam | 6 | 103 | 9/10/37 | 3:27 2/5 |
| 2 M 70 yds | Momo Flag | 4 | 118 | 9/20/44 | 3:31 2/5 |
| 2 1/16 M | Momo Flag | 4 | 120 | 9/27/44 | 3:33 4/5 {WR} |
| 2 1/8 M | Panalong | 7 | 111 | 11/18/39 | 3:46 1/5 |
| 2 3/16 M | Santiago | 5 | 112 | 9/27/41 | 3:51 1/5 |
| 2 1/2 M | Enimrac | 7 | 108 | 10/5/40 | 4:27 2/5 |

== American Horse of the Year Honorees ==
Eight horses that were voted American Horse of the Year ran at Narragansett Park between 1934 and 1949. They are: Equipoise, Cavalcade, Discovery, War Admiral, Seabiscuit, Challedon, Whirlaway and Coaltown.
