= Misty Morn =

American-bred Thoroughbred racehorse

- Sire: Princequillo
- Grandsire: Prince Rose
- Dam: Grey Flight
- Damsire: Mahmoud
- Sex: Filly
- Foaled: 1952
- Country: United States
- Colour: Bay
- Breeder: Wheatley Stable
- Owner: Wheatley Stable
- Trainer: Sunny Jim Fitzsimmons
- Record: 42: 11-6-7
- Earnings: $212,575

Major wins
- Providence Stakes (1955); Gallant Fox Handicap (1955); Molly Pitcher Handicap (1955); Diana Handicap (1955); Monmouth Oaks (1955)

Awards
- U.S. Champion 3-Yr-Old Filly (1955); U.S. Champion Handicap Female (1955)

Honours
- Kentucky Broodmare of the Year (1963)
- Last updated on October 19, 2006

Misty Morn (1952–1971) was an American Thoroughbred racehorse. She was by the stakes–winning sire Princequillo, who had been smuggled from Europe during World War II and who also sired the dam of Secretariat, Somethingroyal. Bred and owned by Gladys Mills Phipps' Wheatley Stable, at age three Misty Morn broke the Jamaica Racetrack track record en route to winning the 1955 Gallant Fox Handicap.

Her first stakes win came versus unrestricted three–year–olds in the Providence Stakes at Narragansett Park. The filly ended up the year as the American Champion Three-Year-Old Filly and American Champion Older Female Horse after additional wins in the Molly Pitcher, Monmouth Oaks and Diana Handicap.

Retired to breeding at Claiborne Farm in Paris, Kentucky, Misty Morn was the 1963 Broodmare of the Year. Two of her foals earned American Champion Two-Year-Old Colt honors: Bold Lad in 1964 and Successor in 1966.
