= Wheatley Stable =

American horse racing operation

- Type: Horse breeding/Racing Stable
- Industry: Thoroughbred Horse racing
- Founded: 1926
- Headquarters: New York City; United States
- Key people: Gladys Mills Phipps, owner Ogden Phipps, owner Henry Carnegie Phipps, previous owner Jim Fitzsimmons, trainer Bill Winfrey, trainer Eddie Neloy, trainer

Wheatley Stable was the nom de course for the thoroughbred horse racing partnership formed by Gladys Mills Phipps and her brother, Ogden Livingston Mills. The horses were raised at Claiborne Farm near Paris, Kentucky.

== History ==
Over the years, Hall of Fame horse trainers Sunny Jim Fitzsimmons, Bill Winfrey and Eddie Neloy conditioned their horses. In February 1926, the stable recorded its first win and that year purchased the yearlings Diavolo and Dice from breeder Harry Payne Whitney. In 1927 Dice won four important stakes races but died unexpectedly. Nevertheless, his performance earned Wheatley Stable its first racing award when he was voted U.S. Champion 2-Year-Old Colt. Diavolo developed more slowly but in 1929 won as U.S. Champion Handicap Male Horse.

Wheatley Stable horses debuted in the U.S. Triple Crown races in 1928. Between then and 1966, the stable entered seven Kentucky Derbys, seven Preakness Stakes, and eleven Belmont Stakes. They won the 1957 Preakness Stakes with Bold Ruler. Triple Crown winner of 1973, Secretariat (Big Red) was the happy result of the mare Somethingroyal being bred with Bold Ruler where he stood at Claiborne Farm near Paris, Kentucky in 1969.

As part of a program honoring important horse racing tracks and racing stables, the Pennsylvania Railroad named its baggage car #5854 the "Wheatley Stable".

The Wheatley Stable bred and raised its horses at Claiborne Farm near Paris, Kentucky. Famously, in 1933 Wheatley Stable bred Seabiscuit but sold him early in his three-year-old season. They also bred Bold Bidder, U.S. Champion Handicap Male Horse for 1966 and the sire of Hall of Fame colt Spectacular Bid. Wheatley Stable bred and raced seven Champions of their own:

- Misty Morn - U.S. Champion 3-Year-Old Filly (1955), U.S. Champion Handicap Female Horse (1955), Broodmare of the Year (1963)
- High Voltage - U.S. Champion 2-Year-Old Filly (1954)
- Bold Ruler - U.S. 3-Yr-Old Champion Male (1957), U.S. Horse of the Year (1957), U.S. Champion Sprint Horse (1958), U.S. Racing Hall of Fame (1973)
- Castle Forbes - U.S. Champion 2-Year-Old Filly (1963)
- Bold Lad - U.S. Champion 2-year-old Colt (1964)
- Bold Lad II - multiple stakes winner in England.
- Successor - U.S. Champion 2-Year-Old Colt (1966)
- Queen Empress - U.S. Champion 2-Year-Old Filly (1964)

Some of Wheatley Stable's major wins include:

- Acorn Stakes: Hostility (1939), High Voltage (1955), Irish Jay (1960), Castle Forbes (1964)
- Alabama Stakes: Nixie (1928), High Bid (1959)
- Brooklyn Handicap: Blenheim (1932), Dark Secret (1933)
- Carter Handicap: Bold Ruler (1958)
- Champagne Stakes: Bold Lad (1964), Successor (1966)
- Coaching Club American Oaks: Edelweiss (1933), High Voltage (1955)
- Derby Trial: Bold Lad (1965)
- Diana Handicap: Misty Morn (1955)
- Flamingo Stakes: Bold Ruler (1957)
- Frizette Stakes: Queen Empress (1964)
- Futurity Stakes Bold Ruler (1956)
- Hopeful Stakes: Bold Lad (1964), What A Pleasure (1967), Irish Castle (1969)
- Jockey Club Gold Cup: Diavolo (1929), Dark Secret (1933 & 1934)
- Lawrence Realization : Carry Over (1934)
- Manhattan Handicap : Dark Secret (1933 & 1934)
- Metropolitan Handicap : Snark (1937), Bold Lad (1966)
- Molly Pitcher Handicap : Misty Morn (1955), Discipline (1966)
- Monmouth Handicap : Bold Ruler (1955)
- Monmouth Oaks : Misty Morn (1958)
- National Stallion Stakes : Bold Lad (1964), Great Power (1966), What A Pleasure (1967)
- National Stallion Stakes (filly division) : High Voltage (1954), Lady Be Good (1958), Beautiful Day (1963), Queen Empress (1964)
- Preakness Stakes : Bold Ruler (1957)
- Spinaway Stakes : Merry Lassie (1937), Irish Jay (1959)
- Suburban Handicap : Snark (1938), Bold Ruler (1958)
- Test Stakes : Nixie (1928), Bold Consort (1963), Discipline (1965)
- Tremont Stakes : Diavolo (1927), Hilarious (1952), Quick Lunch (1953), Bold Lad (1964), Successor (1966)
- Wood Memorial Stakes : Distraction (1928), Teufel (1936), Melodist (1937), Bold Ruler (1957)
- Whitney Handicap : Stupendous (1967)
