= Successor (horse) =

American-bred Thoroughbred racehorse

- Sire: Bold Ruler
- Grandsire: Nasrullah
- Dam: Misty Morn
- Damsire: Princequillo
- Sex: Stallion
- Foaled: 1964
- Country: United States
- Colour: Bay
- Breeder: Wheatley Stable
- Owner: Wheatley Stable
- Trainer: Edward A. Neloy
- Record: 25: 7-6-6
- Earnings: US$532,254

Major wins
- Champagne Stakes (1966); Tremont Stakes (1966); Garden State Stakes (1966); Lawrence Realization Stakes (1967)

Awards
- American Champion Two-Year-Old Colt (1966)

Successor (March 27, 1964 – August 1, 1971) was an American Champion Thoroughbred racehorse.

== Background ==
He was bred and raced by Gladys Phipps and her brother Ogden L. Mills under their Wheatley Stable banner. A full brother to Bold Lad, his sire was eight-time Leading sire in North America, Bold Ruler and his dam was the Champion racing mare, Misty Morn.

== Racing career ==
Successor was the American Champion Two-Year-Old Colt of 1966. Among his wins, Successor defeated the previously unbeaten Dr. Fager by a length to earn a victory in the Champagne Stakes, recording the second fastest time in the race's history. On his final start of the year he won the Garden State Stakes on a sloppy track in November to confirm his position as the year's leading two-year-old.

Successor did not race again until March 13, 1967, when he ran out of the money in the Swift Stakes at Aqueduct Racetrack. Unplaced in the Blue Grass Stakes, Successor finished sixth to winner Proud Clarion in the Kentucky Derby. The colt went on to earn two seconds and two third-place finishes in major races that year and scored a popular win on October 18 in the 1 5/8 mile Lawrence Realization Stakes.

== Stud record ==
On February 17, 1968, Successor was sold for $1,050,000 to Hastings Harcourt's Flag Is Up Farms in Solvang, California. Retired to stud duty, Successor died prematurely after only a few years at age seven. Among his limited progeny, Right Honorable won the Del Mar Derby.

== Pedigree ==
Pedigree of Successor
Sire Bold Ruler	Nasrullah	Nearco	Pharos
Sire Bold Ruler	Nasrullah	Nearco	Nogara
Sire Bold Ruler	Nasrullah	Mumtaz Begum	Blenheim
Sire Bold Ruler	Nasrullah	Mumtaz Begum	Mumtaz Mahal
Sire Bold Ruler	Miss Disco	Discovery	Display
Sire Bold Ruler	Miss Disco	Discovery	Ariadne
Sire Bold Ruler	Miss Disco	Outdone	Pompey
Sire Bold Ruler	Miss Disco	Outdone	Sweep Out
Dam Misty Morn	Princequillo	Prince Rose	Rose Prince
Dam Misty Morn	Princequillo	Prince Rose	Indolence
Dam Misty Morn	Princequillo	Cosquilla	Papyrus
Dam Misty Morn	Princequillo	Cosquilla	Quick Thought
Dam Misty Morn	Grey Flight	Mahmoud	Blenheim
Dam Misty Morn	Grey Flight	Mahmoud	Mah Mahal
Dam Misty Morn	Grey Flight	Planetoid	Ariel
Dam Misty Morn	Grey Flight	Planetoid	La Chica
