= James Cox Brady Jr. =

American financier and horseman

James Cox Brady Jr. (July 28, 1907 - May 24, 1971) was an American financier and horseman. He was the chairman of the New York Racing Association for eight years. He was the father of Nicholas F. Brady, the 68th United States Secretary of the Treasury.
