= Hugh L. Fontaine =

American fighter pilot (1895–1978)

Personal information
- Born: November 7, 1895 New Orleans, Louisiana
- Died: June 1978 (aged 82)
- Occupations: Trainer, fighter pilot

Horse racing career
- Sport: Horse racing

Major racing wins
- Suburban Handicap (1934); Acorn Stakes (1938); Alabama Stakes (1938); Delaware Oaks (1938); New England Oaks (1938); Diana Stakes (1942, 1943, 1957); Hopeful Stakes (1955); Sapling Stakes (1955); Flamingo Stakes (1956); Florida Derby (1956); Fort Lauderdale Handicap (1957); Black Helen Handicap (1958) U.S. Triple Crown series: Kentucky Derby (1956); Belmont Stakes (1956)

Honors
- Distinguished Service Cross

Significant horses
- Handcuff, Needles, Market Wise

Hugh L. Fontaine (November 7, 1895 – June 1978) was an American fighter pilot during World War I and a Thoroughbred racehorse trainer. He was the trainer of the winning horse Needles in the 1956 Kentucky Derby and the 1956 Belmont Stakes.

Born in New Orleans, Hugh Fontaine grew up in Memphis, Tennessee.

== Military career ==
During World War I Lieutenant Fontaine served in France with the United States Army Air Force. By an Act of Congress, on July 9, 1918, he was awarded the Distinguished Service Cross for "extraordinary heroism" while serving with the 49th Aero Squadron, 2nd Pursuit Group.

== Personal life ==
After returning from service, Lieutenant Fontaine married Elizabeth Martin Donelson on April 22, 1929, in Shelby County, Tennessee. They had no children and soon separated.

== Thoroughbred racehorse trainer ==
Fontaine worked as stable manager for William R. Coe before 1937 when he took over from Robert Smith as the head trainer for the Brookmeade Stable of Isabel Dodge Sloane. Among his successes while there, he conditioned Handcuff to 1938 American Champion Three-Year-Old Filly honors.
