= Bold Lad =

American-bred Thoroughbred racehorse

- Sire: Bold Ruler
- Grandsire: Nasrullah
- Dam: Misty Morn
- Damsire: Princequillo
- Sex: Stallion
- Foaled: 1962
- Country: United States
- Colour: Chestnut
- Breeder: Wheatley Stable
- Owner: Wheatley Stable
- Trainer: 1) William C. Winfrey; 2) Edward A. Neloy (1966)
- Record: 19: 14-2-1
- Earnings: US$516,465

Major wins
- Champagne Stakes (1964); Futurity Stakes (1964); Hopeful Stakes ( 1964); Sapling Stakes (1964); Tremont Stakes (1964); National Stallion Stakes (1964); Derby Trial Stakes (1965); Alerted Purse (1966); Roseben Handicap (1966); Metropolitan Handicap (1966)

Awards
- American Champion Two-Year-Old Colt (1964)

Bold Lad (1962–1986) was an American Champion Thoroughbred racehorse.

== Background ==
Bold Lad bred and raced by Gladys Phipps and her brother Ogden L. Mills under their Wheatley Stable banner. His sire was eight-time leading sire in North America Bold Ruler, and his dam was the racing mare Misty Morn. He was trained by Bill Winfrey.

Beatrice Mills Forbes, Lady Granard, the sister of Gladys Mills Phipps and Ogden L. Mills, bred the British mare Barn Pride to Bold Ruler, producing another colt named Bold Lad. Bold Lad raced in England and Ireland, where he, too, won Champion Two-Year-Old Colt honors.

== 1964: two-year-old season ==
At age two, Bold Lad won every important race for his age group. He set a new Saratoga track record of 1:15 3/5 in winning the 6 1/2 furlongs (4,300 ft; 1,300 m) Hopeful Stakes and equalled the Aqueduct track record time of 1:16 in his win in the 6 1/2-furlong (4,300 ft; 1,300 m) Futurity Stakes. Bold Lad's performances made him a unanimous selection as the 1964 American Champion Two-Year-Old Colt.

At the end of 1964, Thomas Trotter, handicapper for The Jockey Club, assigned Bold Lad high weight for 1965 of 130 pounds (59 kg) in the Experimental Free Handicap. The exceptional weight was higher than even the amount assigned to Secretariat, that was allotted 129 pounds (59 kg) in 1972. Bold Lad was the winterbook favorite for the first leg of the 1965 U.S. Triple Crown series, the Kentucky Derby.

== 1965: three-year-old season ==
In early February, Bold Lad suffered a popped splint in his right foreleg while at Hialeah Park Race Track. He did not return to racing until April 5, when he scored a win over older horses in a 6 furlongs (4,000 ft; 1,200 m) sprint at Aqueduct Racetrack. He then ran third in the 1 3/8 mi (2.2 km) Wood Memorial Stakes and won the Derby Trial Stakes. Sent off in the 1 1/4 mi (2.0 km) Kentucky Derby as the betting favorite, Bold Lad was in contention at the top of the stretch, but then tired badly and finished 10th in the field of 11 horses behind winner Lucky Debonair. Bold Lad was diagnosed as suffering from a slight case of anemia and did not run in the Preakness Stakes or Belmont Stakes. Injured again on June 20, 1965, while working out at Aqueduct Racetrack, he underwent surgery and did not race again that year.

== 1966: four-year-old season ==
He was brought back slowly in his four-year-old season by trainer Eddie Neloy, who took over the Wheatley Stable when Bill Winfrey retired. Bold Lad returned to racing on April 30, 1966, with a win at Garden State Park. On May 6, at Aqueduct Racetrack, he won the Alerted Purse and then on May 18 won the Roseben Handicap by three lengths. Still at Aqueduct, on May 30, 1966, Bold Lad won the prestigious Metropolitan Handicap by 2 1/2 lengths while running the mile in 1:34 1/5 under 132 pounds (60 kg). Unbeaten after four starts that season, he was entered in the Suburban Handicap. He was assigned 135 pounds (61 kg), the highest weight for that race since Grey Lag in 1923. On an extremely hot day, he finished sixth to winner Buffle, which carried 110 pounds (50 kg). Jockey Braulio Baeza said Bold Lad seemed to favor his left ankle after the finish of the race. Precautionary X-rays were taken and on August 2, 1966, it was announced that Bold Lad was to be retired to stud.

Despite his shortened 1966 campaign, at the end of the year, Bold Lad was runner-up to Bold Bidder in the voting by the Thoroughbred Racing Association for 1966 American Champion Older Male Horse honors.

== Stud record ==
While Bold Lad sired a number of good offspring as a stallion in Kentucky, France, and Japan, none matched his success on the track. Successor, a full brother to Bold Lad bred by Wheatley Stable and foaled in 1964, also won American Champion Two-Year-Old Colt honors.

== Pedigree ==
Pedigree of Bold Lad
| Sire Bold Ruler | Nasrullah | Nearco | Pharos |
| Sire Bold Ruler | Nasrullah | Nearco | Nogara |
| Sire Bold Ruler | Nasrullah | Mumtaz Begum | Blenheim |
| Sire Bold Ruler | Nasrullah | Mumtaz Begum | Mumtaz Mahal |
| Sire Bold Ruler | Miss Disco | Discovery | Display |
| Sire Bold Ruler | Miss Disco | Discovery | Ariadne |
| Sire Bold Ruler | Miss Disco | Outdone | Pompey |
| Sire Bold Ruler | Miss Disco | Outdone | Sweep Out |
| Dam Misty Morn | Princequillo | Prince Rose | Rose Prince |
| Dam Misty Morn | Princequillo | Prince Rose | Indolence |
| Dam Misty Morn | Princequillo | Cosquilla | Papyrus |
| Dam Misty Morn | Princequillo | Cosquilla | Quick Thought |
| Dam Misty Morn | Grey Flight | Mahmoud | Blenheim |
| Dam Misty Morn | Grey Flight | Mahmoud | Mah Mahal |
| Dam Misty Morn | Grey Flight | Planetoid | Ariel |
| Dam Misty Morn | Grey Flight | Planetoid | La Chica |
