= Bill Winfrey =

American racehorse trainer

William C. Winfrey
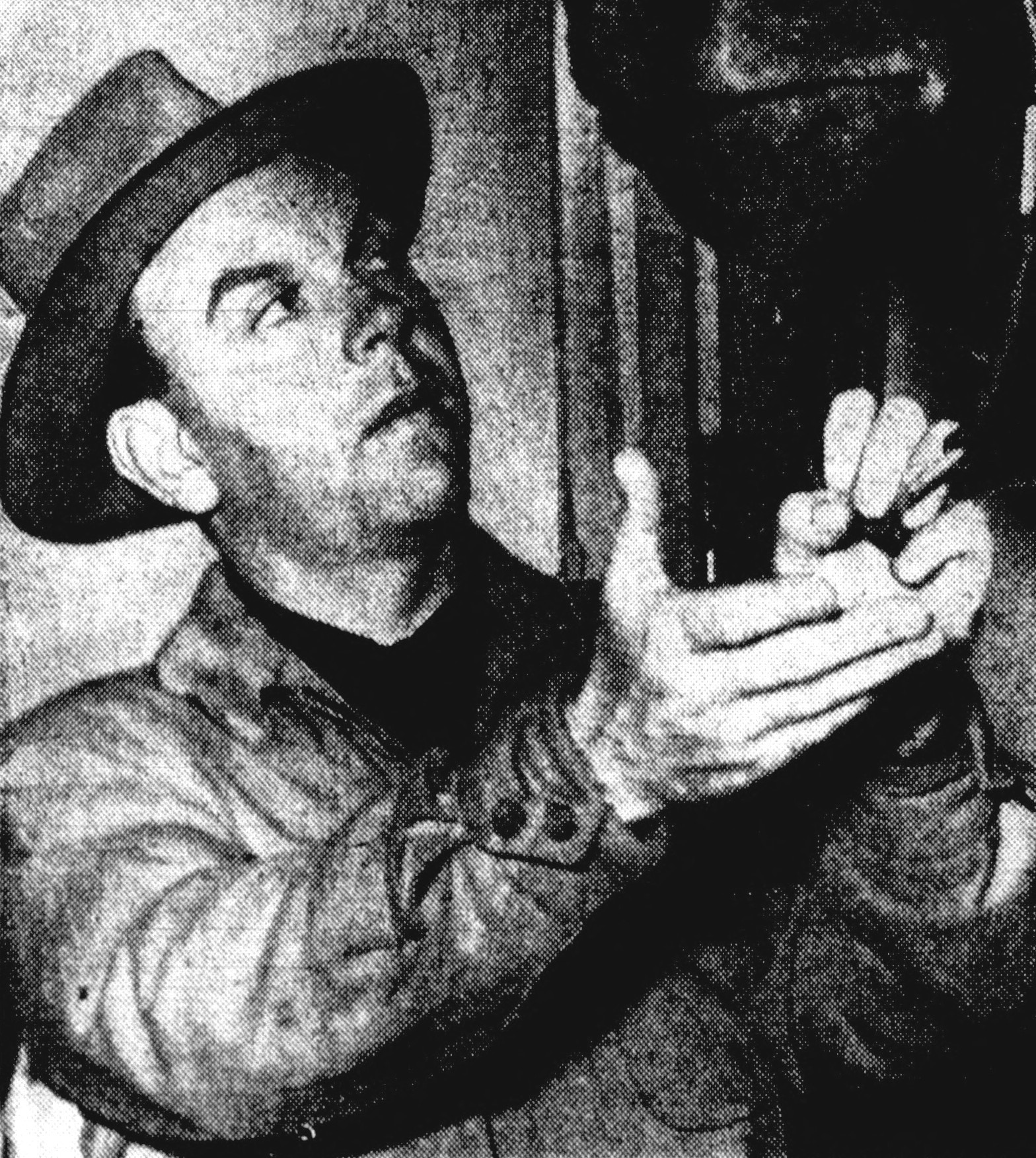
- Winfrey, circa 1950

Personal information
- Born: May 9, 1916 Detroit, Michigan, United States
- Died: April 14, 1994 (aged 77) Lake Forest, California
- Resting place: Masonic Cemetery, Fallbrook, California
- Occupation: Trainer
- Children: Carey Winfrey

Horse racing career
- Sport: Horse racing

Major racing wins
- Bahamas Stakes (1942); Walden Stakes (1948); Demoiselle Stakes (1949, 1964); Marguerite Stakes (1949); Metropolitan Handicap (1949, 1954); National Stallion Stakes (filly division) (1949, 1952, 1963, 1964); Selima Stakes (1949, 1960); Beldame Stakes (1950, 1952); Butler Handicap (1950); Coaching Club American Oaks (1950); Gazelle Stakes (1950); Ladies Handicap (1950); Prioress Stakes (1950, 1955); Suburban Handicap (1950); Great American Stakes (1951, 1964); Hopeful Stakes (1951, 1952); Saratoga Special Stakes (1951, 1952); Belmont Futurity Stakes (1952, 1964); Firenze Handicap (1952); Palos Verdes Handicap (1952); Santa Margarita Invitational Handicap (1952); Youthful Stakes (1952); American Derby (1953); Arlington Classic (1953); Barbara Fritchie Handicap (1953); Empire City Handicap (1953); Excelsior Handicap (1953, 1954, 1956); Gotham Stakes (1953); Travers Stakes (1953); Wood Memorial Stakes (1953); Dwyer Stakes (1953); Vagrancy Handicap (1953); Withers Stakes (1953); Narragansett Special (1954, 1956); Queens County Handicap (1954, 1955); San Carlos Handicap (1954); Whitney Handicap (1954); Wilson Handicap (1954); Manhattan Handicap (1955); McLennan Handicap (1955); Saratoga Handicap (1955); Sunset Handicap (1955, 1957, 1959, 1961); New Orleans Handicap (1956, 1957); Laurel Futurity Stakes (1959); San Marcos Stakes (1960); Spinaway Stakes (1960); Gardenia Stakes (1963, 1964); Champagne Stakes (1964, 1965); Fashion Stakes (1964); Frizette Stakes (1964); Derby Trial Stakes (1965); Test Stakes (1965); Tremont Stakes (1965) American Classic Race wins: Preakness Stakes (1953); Belmont Stakes (1953)

Racing awards
- U.S. Champion trainer by earnings (1964)

Honours
- National Museum of Racing and Hall of Fame (1971)

Significant horses
- Bed O' Roses, Bold Lad, Buckpasser; Castle Forbes, Find, Native Dancer, Next Move, Queen Empress

William Colin Winfrey (May 9, 1916 – April 14, 1994) was an American Hall of Fame Thoroughbred racehorse trainer.

Bill Winfrey was born Colin Dickard. His father died when he was three, and two years later his mother married Hall-of-Fame trainer G. Carey Winfrey. He was officially adopted and took Winfrey's last name. At age 15, he became a jockey, but weight gain forced him to turn to training. In 1932, he became the youngest licensed trainer in the United States. His career was interrupted by service with the United States Marine Corps during World War II. He retired after the 1969 season, but returned to training for two more years in 1977 and 1978. During his career, Bill Winfrey trained 38 stakes winners, including seven champions, of which three were inducted in the U. S. Racing Hall of Fame. The most noted of them was two-time American Horse of the Year, Native Dancer. Winfrey was inducted into the United States' National Museum of Racing and Hall of Fame in 1971.

A resident of San Clemente, California, he died in Lake Forest, California, at age 77 of complications from Alzheimer's disease. His son, Carey Winfrey, was a journalist and editor who served as the editor-in-chief of the Smithsonian magazine from 2001 to 2011 as well as the editor-in-chief of Cuisine and American Health magazines.
