= Edward A. Neloy =

American racehorse trainer

Eddie Neloy
Personal information
- Born: May 15, 1924 United States
- Died: May 26, 1971 (age 47)
- Occupation: Horse trainer

Horse racing career
- Sport: Horse racing

Major racing wins
- Palos Verdes Handicap (1953); Brooklyn Handicap (1954, 1964, 1966); Edgemere Handicap (1954); Kentucky Oaks (1954); Withers Stakes (1954); Santa Maria Handicap (1959); Astoria Stakes (1963, 1964, 1967); Beldame Stakes (1963); Diana Handicap (1963); Acorn Stakes (1964, 1965, 1966); Hopeful Stakes (1964, 1965, 1967, 1969); San Antonio Handicap (1964, 1965); San Fernando Stakes (1964, 1967); Strub Stakes (1964); Tremont Stakes (1964, 1966); Vagrancy Handicap (1964, 1966); Washington Park Handicap (1964); Whitney Handicap (1964, 1967); Woodward Stakes (1964, 1966); Metropolitan Handicap (1965, 1966, 1967); Saratoga Special Stakes (1965, 1967, 1968); American Derby (1966, 1970); Arlington Classic (1966); Champagne Stakes (1966, 1967); Fall Highweight Handicap (1966); Jockey Club Gold Cup (1966); Lawrence Realization Stakes (1966, 1967, 1968); Malibu Stakes (1966); National Stallion Stakes (1966, 1967); Toboggan Handicap (1966); Travers Stakes (1966); Arlington Handicap (1967); Frizette Stakes (1967); Matron Stakes (1967); Royal Palm Handicap (1967); Suburban Handicap (1967); Roamer Handicap (1968); Sanford Stakes (1968); Round Table Handicap (1970); Fashion Stakes (1971)

Racing awards
- U.S. Champion Trainer by earnings (1966, 1967, 1968); National Turf Writers Trainer of the Year (1964, 1966)

Honours
- National Museum of Racing and Hall of Fame (1983)

Significant horses
- Bold Lad, Buckpasser, Gun Bow, Impressive, Numbered Account, Queen of the Stage, Successor, Vitriolic

Edward Albert "Eddie" Neloy (May 15, 1924 – May 26, 1971) was an American Thoroughbred racehorse trainer. At age fourteen, he began working at a racetrack, then joined the United States Army during World War II. During the intense action in the Italian Campaign following Operation Shingle, Neloy was seriously wounded in Anzio and lost an eye.

When the war ended, he returned to work in the horse racing industry. As a trainer in 1945, he won the first race of a career that lasted until his death in 1971. In the mid-1950s, he trained for Maine Chance Farm and in 1964 was voted the National Turf Writers Trainer of the Year following an outstanding season that included numerous stakes wins by Gedney Farms' colt Gun Bow.

In 1966, Neloy was chosen by the Phipps family to replace the retiring Bill Winfrey as their head trainer. He was responsible for conditioning the horses of Gladys Mills Phipps' Wheatley Stable, her son Ogden Phipps, and her grandson Dinny Phipps. In his first year, Neloy met with outstanding success, including winning thirteen straight races with Buckpasser, who was voted American Horse of the Year honors. During the five years he was with the Phipps family until his death in 1971, Neloy was the U.S. leading money-winning trainer for 1966 through 1968 and the trainer of five Champions.

Neloy was training the two-year-old filly Numbered Account and had won the Fashion Stakes with her when he died suddenly of a heart attack in 1971. His accomplishments in Thoroughbred racing were recognized in 1983 when he was posthumously inducted into the United States' National Museum of Racing and Hall of Fame.
