= Cuisine (magazine) =

New Zealand food and wine magazine

- May 2008 issue
- Editor: Kelli Brett
- Categories: Food and wine
- Frequency: Bi-monthly
- Publisher: Slick & Sassy Media
- Founded: 1986
- Country: New Zealand
- Based in: Auckland

Cuisine is a bi-monthly food and wine magazine published in New Zealand. It began publication in 1986, and has also existed in website form since December 2000.

== History ==
Cuisine was the first New Zealand magazine devoted to food and wine. It was started by Hamish Allison, then bought by Julie Dalzell in 1986. It was bought by Independent Newspapers Limited (INL) in 2001. INL sold all its publications to Fairfax Media in 2003, and they became part of Fairfax New Zealand. Cuisine was later bought by Slick & Sassy Media from Fairfax. Kelli Brett is the current editor.

== Cuisine Restaurant of the Year awards ==
In 2004 Cuisine developed a New Zealand restaurant competition. 2011 Results

- Supreme Winner – Merediths
- Best Smart Dining Metropolitan – Merediths
- Runner-up – Ambeli
- Best Smart Dining Regional – Ả Deco
- Runner-up – Boutereys Restaurant & Bar
- Best Casual Dining Metropolitan – Arbitrageur
- Runner-up – Ponsonby Road Bistro
- Best Casual Dining Regional (first equal) – Palate and Riverstone Kitchen
- Best Specialist Restaurant – Cocoro
- Best Winery Restaurant (first equal) – Black Barn Bistro and Pegasus Bay
- Restaurant Personality – Jonny Schwass

2010 Results

- Supreme Winner – Riverstone Kitchen
- Best Smart Dining Metropolitan – The French Café
- Runner-up – Martin Bosley's
- Best Smart Dining Regional (first equal) – Ả Deco and Bouterey's at 251
- Best Casual Dining Metropolitan – Soul Bar & Bistro
- Runner-up – Ponsonby Road Bistro
- Best Casual Dining Regional – Riverstone Kitchen
- Runner-up – Palate
- Best Neighbourhood Restaurant – Ambeli
- Runner-up – Two Fifteen Bistro & Wine Bar
- Best Specialist Restaurant – O’Sarracino
- Runner-up – Ortega Fish Shack & Bar
- Best Winery Restaurant – Pegasus Bay Winery Restaurant
- Runner-up – Black Barn Bistro
- Restaurant Personality – Shae Moleta

2009 Results

- Supreme Winner – Logan Brown
- Best Smart Dining Metropolitan – Logan Brown
- Best Smart Dining Regional – Bouterey's at 251
- Best Casual Dining Metropolitan – Soul Bar & Bistro
- Best Casual Dining Regional – Hopgood's Restaurant & Bar
- Best Neighbourhood Restaurant – Molten
- Best Winery Restaurant – First equal – Terrôir at Craggy Range & Pegasus Bay

2008 Results

- Supreme Winner – Matterhorn
- Best Smart Dining Metropolitan – The French Cafe
- Best Casual Dining Regional – Wendy Campbell's French Bistro
- Best Winery Restaurant – Pegasus Bay
- Best Wine Experience – O’Connell Street Bistro

2007 Results

- Supreme Winner – Martin Bosley's
- Best Smart Dining – Martin Bosley's
- Best Casual Dining Metropolitan – Pravda Café
- Best Casual Dining Regional – The Martinborough at Peppers Martinbourough Hotel
- Best Winery Restaurant – Amisfield Winery Bistro
- Best Wine Experience – O’Connell Street

2006 Results

- Supreme Winner – The French Café
- Best Metropolitan – The French Café
- Runner-up (first equal) – Logan Brown and The Grove
- Best Provincial – The Bach
- Runner-up – Herzog Winery & Luxury Restaurant
- Best Winery – Amisfield Bistro
- Runner-up – Te Awa Winery & Restaurant

2005 Results

- Best Restaurant – Café Bastille
- Best Casual or Café-style Restaurant – Pegasus Bay Winery Restaurant
- Best Service – Soul Bar and Bistro
- Best Wine Service – Logan Brown Restaurant

== Cuisine Artisan Awards ==
In September 2008, Cuisine started the Cuisine Artisan Awards.

The awards are open to small-scale producers of foodstuffs other than Cheese, Wine, Olive Oil, Beer and Coffee. Entrants must have been in business for 12 months so that there is proven commercial success.

2011 Supreme Winner

- Havoc Pork – Yorkshire Black Bacon

2011 Runners-up

- Heilala Vanilla – Vanilla Paste

2011 Finalists

- The Damson Collection – Damson Jam
- Salumeria Fontana – Toulouse Sausage
- Akaroa Salmon – Hot-Smoked Salmon
- J Friend & Co – Beechwood Honeydew Honey
- Addmore – Elderflower Rosé
- Ludbrook House – Pickled Limes
- Clearwater's Organic Dairy – Cream Top Yoghurt with a Touch of Clover Honey
- Orcona Chillies – Harissa Paste
- Dollop Puddings – Vanilla Bean Custard
- Piako Gourmet Yoghurt – Frozen Yoghurt Lime Zest

Close favourites

- Annabelle Guinness's Love Fudge
- Aromatics Magical Mushroom Essence
- Fire Dragon chilli sauces
- Marama Organic Farm sheep sausages

2010 Supreme Winner

- Clevedon Valley Buffalo Yoghurt

2010 Runners-up

- Elderflower Cordial – Addmore Products
- New Zealand Artisan Wild Thyme Honey – J Friend and Co

2010 Finalists

- Mandys Horseradish – Horseradish New Zealand
- Unsalted Cultured Butter – Karikaas Natural Dairy Products
- Golden Syrup Ice-Cream – Kohu Road
- Fresh Chorizo – Mariano's Spanish Goods
- Pic's Really Good Peanut Butter – Picot Productions
- Proper Crisps – Proper Foods
- Ciabatta – Rachel Scott Bread
- Spiced Lavash – Ringawera Waiheke Island
- Damson Paste – The Damson Collection

2009 Supreme Winner

- Sicilian Sweet Fennel Sausages – Salumeria Fontana

2009 Runner-up

- Kina Pate – Apatu Aqua

2009 Finalists

- Roasted Cherry Chutney – Provisions
- Walnut Spread – Uncle Joe's
- Sesame Seed Lavash – Ringawera
- White Sourdough – The French Baker
- Wine Barrel Smoked Mushrooms – Aromatics
- Dessert Figs – Ludbrook House
- Elderflower Rhubarb Sparkle – Aroha
- Havelock Cheese – Sherrington Grange

== Wither Hills wine controversy ==
In 2006, Wither Hills Sauvignon Blanc 2006 was stripped of its five-star rating by Cuisine after scientific tests by the Institute of Environmental Science and Research revealed that the wine submitted for review was not the same as that available in shops. The magazine's wine critic, Michael Cooper, said he was told that the magazine's publishers, Fairfax Media, would not be making public the reason for the reversal. He then went to The New Zealand Herald with the story, and his contract, which was to come to an end the following year, was terminated early.

== See also ==
- List of food and drink magazines
