= American Health (magazine) =

American Health was an American magazine devoted to health, and has been called "one of the fastest-growing magazines of the 1980s".

== History and profile ==
T George Harris and Owen J. Lipstein established American Health in 1981. The first issue appeared in March 1982. Its editors have included Stephen Kiesling, T George Harris and Joel Gurin. The magazine was acquired by the Reader's Digest Association in 1990. The readers of the magazine were mostly women. In May 1984 the frequency of the magazine switched to monthly.

According to an abstract, Madison Avenue magazine reported in 1986 that American Health had an "upbeat and informative" tone and boasted of a circulation of 85,000. The last issue of American Health was published in October 1999. Then, its trademark and circulation assets had been acquired by Time Warner's Health magazine.

American Health received the National Magazine Award for General Excellence (400,000 to 1,000,000 circulation) from the American Society of Magazine Editors in 1985, and was a finalist in that category in 1984, as well as being a finalist for the Public Interest award in 1991. The magazine won two American Psychological Association National Media Awards and a Sidney Hillman Foundation prize.
