= Lists of horse-related topics =

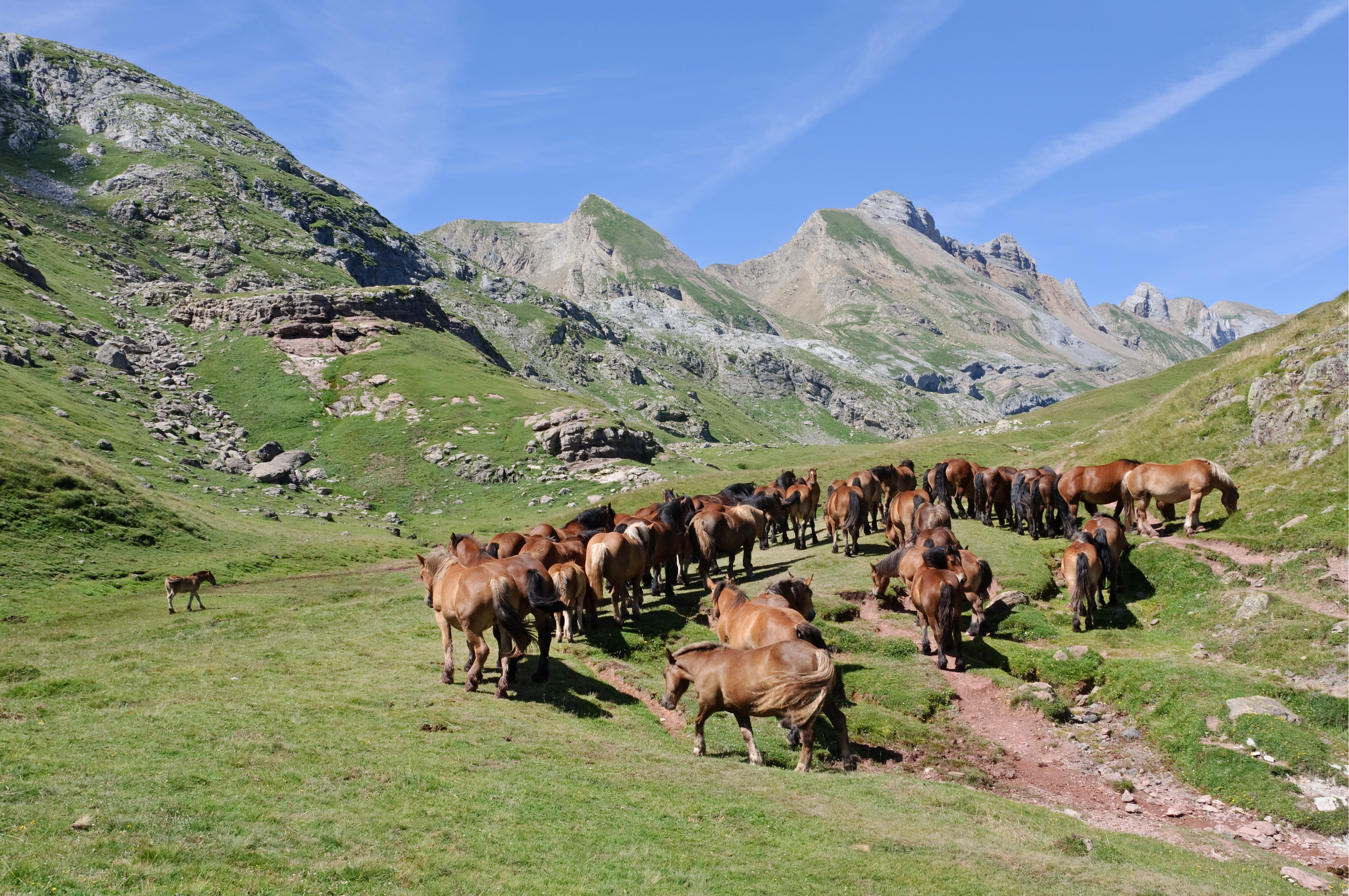

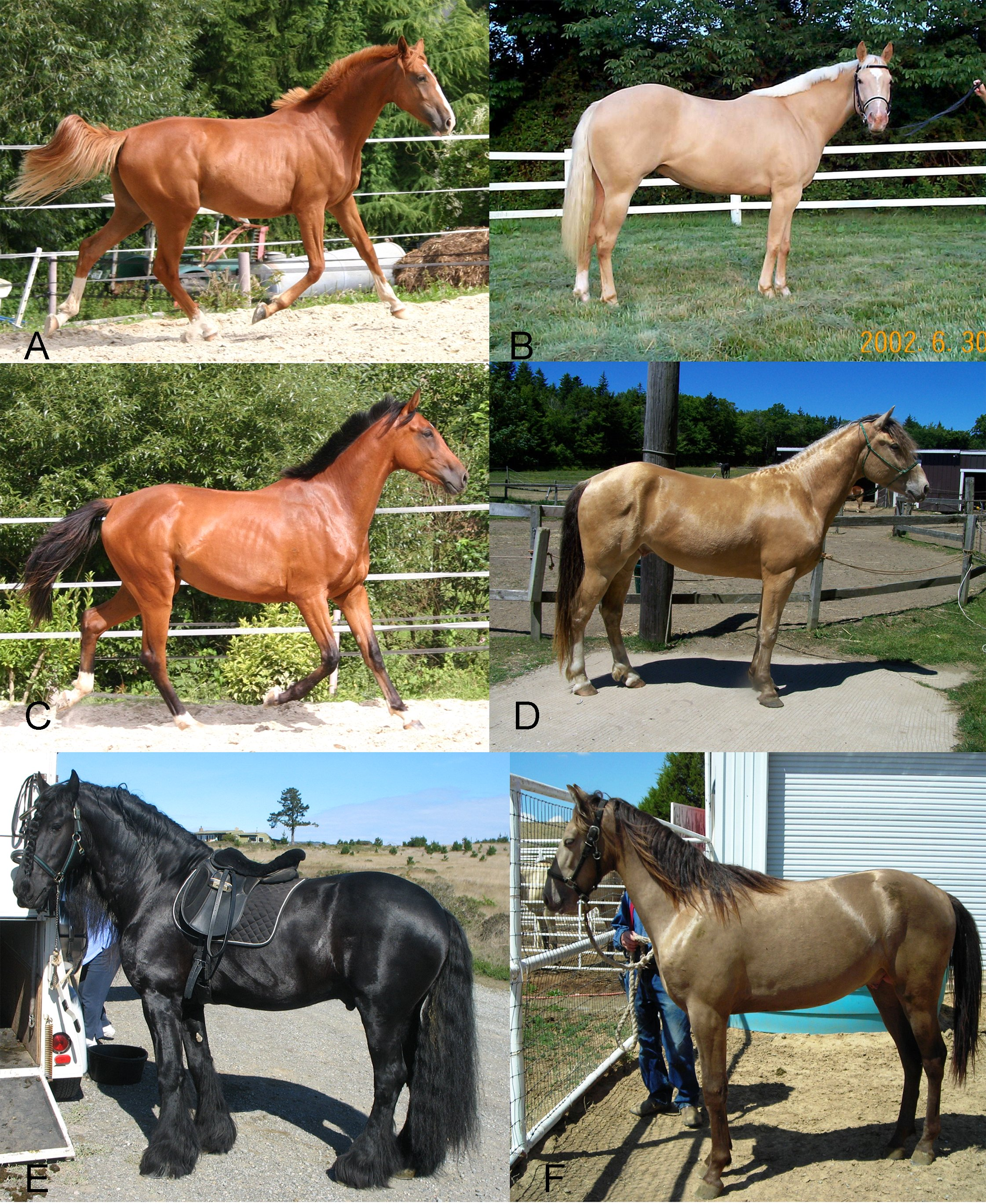

Lists of horse-related topics are lists related to horses. They include lists of breeds, related species, individual horses (historical and fictional), race horses, horse race results and horse shows.

== Types ==
=== Breeds ===
- List of horse breeds
- List of African horse breeds
- List of gaited horse breeds
- List of Brazilian horses
- List of U.S. state horses
- List of French horse breeds
- List of Italian horse breeds

=== Scientific classification ===
- List of perissodactyls for all modern relatives of the horse
- Odd-toed ungulate for the mammal order containing the horse

== Individual horses ==
- List of historical horses
- List of horses of the American Civil War

== Fictional and legendary horses ==
- List of horses in mythology and folklore
  - Horses of the Æsir
  - List of winged horses
  - Horse in Chinese mythology
- List of fictional horses

== Films about horses ==
- List of films about horses
- List of films about horse racing

== Race horses ==
- List of leading Thoroughbred racehorses
- Repeat winners of horse races

=== Sires lists ===
- Leading sire in North America
- Leading sire in Australia
- Leading sire in France
- Leading sire in Germany
- Leading sire in Great Britain and Ireland
- Leading sire in Japan
- Leading broodmare sire in Japan
- Leading broodmare sire in Great Britain and Ireland
- Leading broodmare sire in North America

== Lists of horse race results ==
=== A–F ===
- All Brandy Stakes top three finishers
- Belmont Stakes Top three finishers
- Black-Eyed Susan Stakes top three finishers
- Breeders' Cup Juvenile Turf top three finishers
- Chick Lang Stakes top three finishers
- Dahlia Stakes top three finishers
- Dancing Count Stakes top three finishers
- Deputed Testamony Stakes top three finishers
- Dixie Stakes top three finishers
- Federico Tesio Stakes top three finishers
- Forward Gal Stakes top three finishers

=== G–L ===
- Gardenia Stakes top three finishers
- Geisha Handicap top three finishers
- Hollywood Futurity top three finishers
- Horatius Stakes top three finishers
- Humana Distaff Handicap finishers and starters
- James W. Murphy Stakes top three finishers
- Kentucky Derby top four finishers
- Kentucky Oaks top three finishers
- Laurel Futurity Stakes top three finishers

=== M–Z ===
- Marshua Stakes top three finishers
- Maryland Million Classic top three finishers
- Maryland Million Ladies top three finishers
- Maryland Million Nursery top three finishers
- Miracle Wood Stakes top three finishers
- Native Dancer Stakes top three finishers
- Preakness Stakes top four finishers
- Private Terms Stakes top three finishers
- Selima Stakes top three finishers
- Travers Stakes top three finishers

== Other lists ==
- List of horse shows
  - List of World Grand Champion Tennessee Walking Horses
- List of BLM Herd Management Areas
- List of rodeos
