= 2002 in sports =

2002 in sports describes the year's events in world sport.

== Alpine skiing ==
- Alpine Skiing World Cup
  - Women's overall season champion: Michaela Dorfmeister, Austria

== American football ==
- Super Bowl XXXVI – the New England Patriots (AFC) won 20–17 over the heavily favored St. Louis Rams (NFC)
  - Location: Superdome
  - Attendance: 72,922
  - MVP: Tom Brady, QB (New England)
- Rose Bowl (2001 season):
  - The Miami Hurricanes won 37–14 over the Nebraska Cornhuskers to win the college football national championship
- ArenaBowl XVI – San Jose SaberCats win 52–14 over the Arizona Rattlers
- The Houston Texans become the NFL's 32nd active franchise.

== Association football ==
- 2002 FIFA World Cup is held from May 31 to June 30 in South Korea and Japan, the first time a World Cup is held in Asia and by two countries simultaneously. Brazil wins its fifth title, defeating Germany 2–0 in the final. Surprisingly, Turkey and host nation South Korea take 3rd and 4th.
- Champions' League – Real Madrid beats Bayer Leverkusen 2–1 in the final. This was Real Madrid's 9th European Cup.
- UEFA Cup – Feyenoord wins 3–2 in the final against Borussia Dortmund, winning the cup for the second time.
- European Super Cup – Real Madrid wins 3–1 over Feyenoord, winning the cup for the first time.
- Intercontinental Cup – Real Madrid beats Olimpia Asunción 2–0, winning the cup for the third time.

== Athletics ==
- July – 2002 Commonwealth Games held in Manchester
- August – 2002 European Championships in Athletics held in Munich
- October – 2002 Asian Games held in Busan, South Korea

== Australian rules football ==
- Australian Football League
  - The Brisbane Lions win the 106th AFL premiership (Brisbane Lions 10.15 (75) d Collingwood 9.12 (66))
  - Brownlow Medal awarded to Simon Black (Brisbane Lions)
  - See also Australian Football League season 2002
- Inaugural Australian Football International Cup, the 2002 International Cup won by Ireland

== Baseball ==
- World Series – Anaheim Angels win 4 games to 3 over the San Francisco Giants

== Basketball ==
- NBA Finals –
  - Los Angeles Lakers sweep the New Jersey Nets to win their third straight NBA title. Shaquille O'Neal wins his third straight NBA Finals MVP award, and coach Phil Jackson wins his ninth title, and his third three-peat.
  - NBA's Charlotte Hornets moved to New Orleans.
- NCAA Men's Basketball Championship –
  - Maryland Terrapins win 64–52 over the Indiana Hoosiers
- WNBA finals
  - Los Angeles Sparks win 2 games to 0 over the New York Liberty
- FIBA World Championship won by Yugoslavia
- FIBA World Championship for Women won by USA
- Chinese Basketball Association finals:
  - Yao Ming and his Shanghai Sharks teammates defeat Bayi Rockets, 3 games to 1, snapping a string of six consecutive Bayi championships.
- National Basketball League (Australia) Finals:
  - Adelaide 36ers defeated the West Sydney Razorbacks 2–1 in the best-of-three final series.
- October 5 – University Athletic Association of the Philippines men's division finals: The Ateneo Blue Eagles defeat the De La Salle Green Archers to end their 4-year title streak and win the school their first title in 14 years.

== Boxing ==
- June 21 – Lennox Lewis retains boxing's WBC world Heavyweight crown with an eight-round knockout over Mike Tyson
- April – The Ring Magazine released its new championship policy, "The Ring's Championship Policy"
- July 12 to July 21 – 34th European Amateur Boxing Championships held in Perm, Russia

== Canadian football ==
- November 23 – Saint Mary's Huskies win the Vanier Cup game, defeating the Saskatchewan Huskies 39–23.
- November 24 – the Montreal Alouettes win the 90th Grey Cup game, defeating the Edmonton Eskimos 25–16 at Commonwealth Stadium in Edmonton.

== Cricket ==
- March 23 – death of Ben Hollioake, Surrey and England player, in a car crash
- June 1 – death of Hansie Cronje, South African player still involved in match-fixing controversy, in an air crash
- New Zealand are forced to abandon their tour of Pakistan after a bomb explodes outside their hotel in Karachi
- County Championship (England and Wales) – Surrey CCC

== Cycle racing ==
Road bicycle racing

- Giro d'Italia won by Paolo Savoldelli of Italy
- Tour de France – Lance Armstrong of the United States (Rescinded)
- UCI Road World Championships – Men's road race – Mario Cipollini, of Italy

Cyclo-cross

- 2–3 February – UCI Cyclo-cross World Championships held in Zolder, Belgium
  - men's competition won by Mario De Clercq
  - women's competition won by Laurence Leboucher

== Dogsled racing ==
- Iditarod Trail Sled Dog Race Champion
  - Martin Buser wins with lead dog Bronson

== Field hockey ==
- 2002 Men's Hockey World Cup: Germany
- 2002 Women's Hockey World Cup: Argentina
- Men's Hockey at the 2002 Commonwealth Games: Australia
- Hockey at the 2002 Commonwealth Games – Women's tournament: India
- Men's Champions Trophy: Netherlands
- Women's Champions Trophy: China

== Figure skating ==
- World Figure Skating Championships –
  - Men's champion: Alexei Yagudin, Russia
  - Ladies' champion: Irina Slutskaya, Russia
  - Pair skating champions: Shen Xue & Zhao Hongbo, China
  - Ice dancing champions: Irina Lobacheva & Ilia Averbukh, Russia
- 2002 Winter Olympics –
  - Men's champion: Alexei Yagudin, Russia
  - Ladies' champion: Sarah Hughes, United States
  - Pair skating champions: Yelena Berezhnaya & Anton Sikharulidze, Russia and Jamie Salé & David Pelletier, Canada
  - Ice dancing champions: Marina Anissina & Gwendal Peizerat, France

== Floorball ==
- Men's World Floorball Championships
  - Champion: Sweden
- European Cup
  - Men's champion: Haninge IBK
  - Women's champion: Balrog IK

== Gaelic Athletic Association ==
- Camogie
  - All-Ireland Camogie Champion: Cork
  - National Camogie League: Galway
- Gaelic football
  - All-Ireland Senior Football Championship – Armagh 1-12 died Kerry 0–14
  - National Football League – Tyrone 0-15 died Cavan 0–7
- Ladies' Gaelic football
  - All-Ireland Senior Football Champion: Mayo
  - National Football League: Waterford
- Hurling
  - All-Ireland Senior Hurling Championship – Kilkenny 2-20 died Clare 0–19
  - National Hurling League – Kilkenny 2–15 beat Cork 2–14

== Golf ==
Men's professional

- – Masters Tournament – Tiger Woods becomes the third golfer to win The Masters in two consecutive years
- – U.S. Open – Tiger Woods is the only golfer under par for the tournament.
- – British Open – Ernie Els wins his third major and first British Open.
- – PGA Championship – Rich Beem wins by one shot over Tiger Woods.
- PGA Tour money leader – Tiger Woods – $6,912,625
- PGA Tour Player of the Year – Tiger Woods
- PGA Tour rookie of the year – Jonathan Byrd
- Senior PGA Tour money leader – Hale Irwin – $3,028,304
- Ryder Cup – Europe defeats the United States 15.5-12.5.

Men's amateur

- British Amateur – Alejandro Larrazabal
- U.S. Amateur – Ricky Barnes
- European Amateur – Raphaël Pellicioli

Women's professional

- Nabisco Championship – Annika Sörenstam
- LPGA Championship – Se Ri Pak
- U.S. Women's Open – Juli Inkster
- Women's British Open – Karrie Webb
- LPGA Tour money leader – Annika Sörenstam – $2,863,904
- LPGA Tour Player of the Year – Annika Sörenstam
- The United States team defeats the European team 15 ½ – 12 ½ to regain the Solheim Cup.

== Handball ==
- Men's European Championship: Sweden
- Women's European Championship: Denmark
- Asian Games (Men): Korea
- Asian Games (Women): Korea

== Harness racing ==
- North America Cup – Red River Hanover
- United States Pacing Triple Crown races –
  1. Cane Pace won by Art Major
  2. Little Brown Jug won by Million Dollar Cam
  3. Messenger Stakes won by Allamerican Ingot
- United States Trotting Triple Crown races –
  1. Hambletonian won by Chip Chip Hooray
  2. Yonkers Trot won by Bubba Dunn
  3. Kentucky Futurity won by Like a Prayer

== Horse racing ==
Steeplechases

- Cheltenham Gold Cup – Best Mate
- Grand National – Bindaree

Hurdle races

- Champion Hurdle – Hors La Loi III

Flat races

- Australia – Melbourne Cup won by Media Puzzle
- Canada – Queen's Plate won by T J's Lucky Moon
- Dubai – Dubai World Cup won by Street Cry
- France – Prix de l'Arc de Triomphe won by Marienbard
- Ireland – Irish Derby Stakes won by High Chaparral
- Japan – Japan Cup won by Falbrav
- English Triple Crown Races:
  1. 2,000 Guineas Stakes – Rock of Gibraltar
  2. The Derby – High Chaparral
  3. St. Leger Stakes – Bollin Eric
- United States Triple Crown Races:
  1. Kentucky Derby – War Emblem
  2. Preakness Stakes – War Emblem
  3. Belmont Stakes – Sarava
- Breeders' Cup World Thoroughbred Championships:
  1. Breeders' Cup Classic – Volponi
  2. Breeders' Cup Distaff – Azeri
  3. Breeders' Cup Filly & Mare Turf – Starine
  4. Breeders' Cup Juvenile – Vindication
  5. Breeders' Cup Juvenile Fillies – Storm Flag Flying
  6. Breeders' Cup Mile – Domedriver
  7. Breeders' Cup Sprint – Orientate
  8. Breeders' Cup Turf – High Chaparral

== Ice hockey ==
- Canada defeats the United States 5–2 to win the men's Olympic Gold Medal.
- Canada defeats the United States 3–2 to win the women's Olympic Gold Medal.
- World Hockey Championship
  - Men's champion: Slovakia defeats Russia.
  - Junior Men's champion: Russia defeats Canada.
  - Women's champion: no tournament.
- Stanley Cup – Detroit Red Wings win 4 games to 1 over the Carolina Hurricanes.
- Art Ross Trophy as the NHL's leading scorer during the regular season: Jarome Iginla, Calgary Flames.
- Hart Memorial Trophy for the NHL's Most Valuable Player:
  - José Théodore, Montreal Canadiens.

== Lacrosse ==
- The Baltimore Bayhawks win the Steinfeld Cup over the Long Island Lizards.
- The Toronto Rock beat the Albany Attack, 13–12 to win the Champion's Cup.
- The 9th World Lacrosse Championship is held in Perth, Australia. The United States beat Canada 18–15 in the final.
- The Coquitlam Adanacs win the Mann Cup.
- The St. Catharines Athletics win the Minto Cup.
- The Wallaceburg Red Devils win the Founders Cup.

== Mixed martial arts ==
The following is a list of major noteworthy MMA events during 2002 in chronological order.

Date	Event	Alternate Name/s	Location	Attendance	PPV Buyrate	Notes
January 11	UFC 35: Throwdown	—N/a	Uncasville, Connecticut, United States	9,600	35,000	—N/a
February 22	Pride The Best Vol. 1	—N/a	Tokyo, Japan	—N/a	—N/a	—N/a
February 24	Pride 19: Bad Blood	—N/a	Saitama, Japan	—N/a	—N/a	—N/a
March 22	UFC 36: Worlds Collide	—N/a	Las Vegas, United States	10,000	55,000	This event featured the last UFC appearance's from Pat Miletich and Pete Williams.
April 28	Pride 20: Armed and Ready	—N/a	Yokohama, Japan	—N/a	—N/a	—N/a
May 10	UFC 37: High Impact	—N/a	Bossier City, Louisiana, United States	7,200	50,000	—N/a
June 22	UFC 37.5: As Real As It Gets	—N/a	Las Vegas, United States	3,700	—N/a	This event featured the first appearance of longtime UFC announcer Joe Rogan.
June 23	Pride 21: Demolition	—N/a	Saitama, Japan	—N/a	—N/a	—N/a
July 13	UFC 38: Brawl at the Hall	—N/a	Saitama, Japan	3,800	45,000	—N/a
July 20	Pride The Best Vol. 2	—N/a	Tokyo, Japan	—N/a	—N/a	—N/a
August 28	Pride Shockwave	Dynamite!	Tokyo, Japan	91,108	—N/a	Event featured a Royce Gracie vs. Hidehiko Yoshida Jujutsu match and two K-1 kickboxing matches. This event holds the highest attendance for a predominately MMA event.
September 27	UFC 39: The Warriors Return	—N/a	Uncasville, Connecticut, United States	7,800	45,000	—N/a
September 29	Pride 22: Beasts From The East 2	—N/a	Nagoya, Japan	—N/a	—N/a	—N/a
November 22	UFC 40: Vendetta	—N/a	Las Vegas, United States	13,265	150,000	This event was the first to gain mainstream converge for a MMA event in the USA. The event also was noted as an important fiscal milestone for Zuffa and the UFC.
November 24	Pride 23: Championship Chaos 2	—N/a	Tokyo, Japan	—N/a	—N/a	—N/a
December 23	Pride 24: Cold Fury 3	—N/a	Fukuoka, Japan	—N/a	—N/a	—N/a

== Orienteering ==
- First Mountain Bike Orienteering World Championships are held July 2–7 in Fontainebleau, France.

== Radiosport ==
- The fourth World Radiosport Team Championship held in Helsinki, Finland. Gold medals go to Jeff Steinman N5TJ and Dan Street K1TO of the United States, the team's third victory in a row.
- Eleventh Amateur Radio Direction Finding World Championship held in Tatranske Matliare, Slovakia.

== Rugby league ==
- The Australian Rugby League Hall of Fame is established.
- 2002 New Zealand rugby league tour
  - 2002 New Zealand rugby league tour of Great Britain and France
- 2002 NRL season
  - 2002 NRL grand final
- 2002 State of Origin series
- Super League VII
  - 2002 Super League Grand Final
- 2002 World Club Challenge

== Rugby union ==
- 108th Six Nations Championship series is won by France who complete the Grand Slam
- Tri Nations – New Zealand
- Heineken Cup – Leicester Tigers 15–9 Munster

== Ski mountaineering ==
- Inaugural World Championship of Skimountaineering sanctioned by the International Council for Ski Mountaineering Competitions (ICSM) was held in Serre Chevalier in France from January 24 to January 27.

== Snooker ==
- World Snooker Championship – Peter Ebdon beats Stephen Hendry 18–17
- World rankings – Ronnie O'Sullivan becomes world number one for 2002–03

== Swimming ==
- 26 January – in Berlin, Slovak swimmer Martina Moravcová betters Jenny Thompson's world record in the women's 100m butterfly (short course) from 56:56 to 56:55
- April – 6th World Short Course Championships held at Moscow
  - United States wins the most medals (26) Australia the most gold medals (10)
- July–August – 26th European LC Championships held at Berlin
  - Germany wins the most medals (23) and the most gold medals (10)
- August – 9th Pan Pacific Championships held at Yokohama
  - United States wins the most medals (52) and the most gold medals (21)
- 22 November – US swimmer Natalie Coughlin betters Martina Moravcová's world record in the women's 100m butterfly (short course) from 56:55 to 56:39
- December – 6th European SC Championships held at Riesa, Germany
  - Germany wins the most medals (22) and the most gold medals (7)

== Tennis ==
See also 2002 ATP Tour, 2002 WTA Tour

- Grand Slam in tennis men's results:
  1. Australian Open – Thomas Johansson
  2. French Open – Albert Costa
  3. Wimbledon championships – Lleyton Hewitt
  4. U.S. Open – Pete Sampras
- Grand Slam in tennis women's results:
  1. Australian Open – Jennifer Capriati
  2. French Open – Serena Williams
  3. Wimbledon championships – Serena Williams
  4. U.S. Open – Serena Williams
- Davis Cup – in the final, Russia defeats France 3–2 at the Palais Omnisports de Paris-Bercy in Paris
- Fed Cup – Slovakia defeats Spain 3–1 in the final at Palacio de Congresos de Maspalomas in Gran Canaria, Spain

== Volleyball ==
- 2002 FIVB Men's World Championship: Brazil
- 2002 FIVB Women's World Championship: Italy
- 2002 Men's World League: Russia
- 2002 Women's World Grand Prix: Russia
- Men's volleyball at the 2002 Asian Games: South Korea
- Women's volleyball at the 2002 Asian Games: China

== Water polo ==
- 2002 FINA Men's Water Polo World Cup: Russia
- 2002 FINA Men's Water Polo World League: Russia
- 2002 FINA Women's Water Polo World Cup: Hungary

== Winter Olympics ==
- 2002 Winter Olympics takes place in Salt Lake City, United States
  - Norway wins the most medals (25) and the most gold medals (13)
  - Top performers include Janica Kostelić, Ole Einar Bjørndalen and Simon Ammann
  - A scandal in figure skating dominates the news.
  - Also on the short track, Steven Bradbury of Australia becomes the first Winter Olympic gold medalist from the Southern Hemisphere when a crash on the final corner of the men's 1000 m final leaves him the "last man standing".

== Multi-sport events ==
- 2002 Commonwealth Games held in Manchester, England
- 2002 Asian Games held in Busan, South Korea
- 2002 Gay Games held in Sydney, Australia
- 2002 South American Games held in Belém, Brazil
- 2002 Central American and Caribbean Games held in San Salvador, El Salvador

== Awards ==
- Associated Press Male Athlete of the Year – Lance Armstrong, Cycling
- Associated Press Female Athlete of the Year – Serena Williams, Tennis
