= 2002 Belmont Stakes =

American horse race

134th Belmont Stakes
- Belmont Stakes
- Location: Belmont Park; Elmont, New York
- Date: June 8, 2002
- Distance: 1 1/2 mi (12 furlongs; 2,414 m)
- Winning horse: Sarava
- Winning time: 2:29.71
- Final odds: 70.25 (to 1)
- Jockey: Edgar Prado
- Trainer: Kenneth McPeek
- Owner: New Phoenix Stables and Susan Roy
- Conditions: Fast
- Surface: Dirt

The 2002 Belmont Stakes was the 134th running of the Belmont Stakes. The 1 1/2-mile (2,400 m) race, known as the "test of the champion" and sometimes called the "final jewel" in thoroughbred horse racing's Triple Crown series, was held on June 8, 2002, three weeks after the Preakness Stakes and five weeks after the Kentucky Derby.

War Emblem, trained by Bob Baffert and ridden by Victor Espinoza, was the race favorite after winning the Kentucky Derby and Preakness Stakes in front-running fashion. However, he lost all chance of completing the Triple Crown after stumbling at the start of the race. Lightly regarded Sarava won at odds of 70–1, the biggest long-shot in the history of the Belmont Stakes.

== Pre-race ==
War Emblem established himself as the horse to beat in the Belmont Stakes after wire-to-wire wins in the Kentucky Derby and Preakness Stakes. Despite his racing ability, he was a temperamental colt known around the stable as "Hannibal Lecter" for his habit of trying to bite anyone who came too close. Baffert was optimistic about the colt's chances, saying, "With [jockey] Victor [Espinoza], there's no thinking involved. Just get him out of the gate and let him go."

With Puzzlement a late scratch, ten other horses entered the race but only a few were given serious consideration by the bettors. War Emblem had already beaten most of the horses in the field, including Proud Citizen (2nd in the Derby, 3rd in the Preakness), Perfect Drift (3rd in the Derby), Medaglia d'Oro (4th in the Derby and 8th in the Preakness) and Magic Weisner (2nd in the Preakness). Of the "new shooters", the most highly regarded was Sunday Break, who had won the Peter Pan Stakes in May.

Trainer Kenneth McPeek had trained the beaten favorite for the Kentucky Derby, Harlan's Holiday. However, his entry in the Belmont was the lightly regarded Sarava, whose only win was the Sir Barton Stakes in May. "He's a nice horse," said McPeek. "He's a horse that's kind of coming together late. He's been a bit of a surprise for everybody, but at the same time, he's very well bred."

A then record crowd of 103,222 attended the race.

== Race description ==
War Emblem stumbled badly at the start and lost several lengths to the rest of the field. Baffert knew immediately that his chance to win the Triple Crown was over. "If I was on the walkie-talkie, I would have told Victor to pull him up. I didn't want him to go a mile and a half like that."

Espinoza tried to salvage the situation by moving War Emblem to the rail behind the early leaders, Wiseman's Ferry and Medaglia d'Oro. War Emblem disliked being behind horses though and fought with Espinoza's attempts to settle him. He moved to the lead with about half a mile left in the race, but then ran out of energy, eventually finishing eighth. Medaglia d'Oro recovered the lead but was run down by Sarava in the stretch, who won by half a length. The two were well clear of Sunday Break in third.

"Of course we were shocked," said Gary Drake, Sarava's part-owner. "You don't lead a horse over there at 70-1 and not be surprised when he wins." McPeek added, "We just didn't know how good he was. You never do until you throw him in the ring with this kind."

== Chart ==
| Finish | Program Number | Horse | Margin | Jockey | Trainer | Post Time Odds | Winnings |
|---|---|---|---|---|---|---|---|
| 1 | 12 | Sarava | 1/2 | Edgar Prado | Kenneth McPeek | 70.25 | $600,000 |
| 2 | 8 | Medaglia d'Oro | 9 1/2 | Kent Desormeaux | Robert Frankel | 16.00 | $200,000 |
| 3 | 5 | Sunday Break (JPN) | 1 | Gary Stevens | Neil Drysdale | 8.10 | $110,000 |
| 4 | 11 | Magic Weisner | 1 1/4 | Richard Migliore | Nancy Alberts | 7.30 | $60,000 |
| 5 | 9 | Proud Citizen | 1 1/4 | Mike E. Smith | D. Wayne Lukas | 7.00 | $30,000 |
| 6 | 4 | Essence of Dubai | 4 1/4 | Jerry Bailey | Saeed bin Suroor | 20.60 | |
| 7 | 2 | Like a Hero | 1 3/4 | Pat Day | C. Greely | 25.50 | |
| 8 | 10 | War Emblem | 30 3/4 | Victor Espinoza | Bob Baffert | 1.25 | |
| 9 | 3 | Wiseman's Ferry | 1 | Jorge Chavez | Niall O'Callaghan | 18.80 | |
| 10 | 6 | Perfect Drift | 20 3/4 | Eddie Delahoussaye | Murray Johnson | 5.60 | |
| 11 | 1 | Artax Too | | José A. Santos | Jennifer Pedersen | 71.75 | |

Source: Equibase
Times: 1/4 — 0:24.11; 1/2 — 0:48.09; 3/4 — 1:12.38; mile — 1:37.01; 1 1/4 — 2:03.50; final — 2:29.71.
Fractional Splits: (:24.11) (:23.98) (:24.29) (:24.63) (:26.49) (:26.21)

== Payout ==
The 135th Belmont Payout Schedule

| Program Number | Horse Name | Win | Place | Show |
|---|---|---|---|---|
| 12 | Sarava | $142.50 | $50.00 | $22.40 |
| 8 | Medaglia d'Oro | - | $16.00 | $10.80 |
| 5 | Sunday Break | - | - | $7.10 |

- $2 Exacta (12-8): $2,454.00
- $2 Trifecta (12-8-5): $25,219.00
- $2 Superfecta (12-8-5-1): $145,334.00

== See also ==
- 2002 Kentucky Derby
- 2002 Preakness Stakes
