= Dancing Count Stakes =

- Class: Ungraded Stakes
- Location: Laurel Park Racecourse, Laurel, Maryland, United States
- Inaugurated: 1985
- Race type: Thoroughbred - Flat racing
- Website: www.laurelpark.com

Race information
- Distance: 6 furlongs
- Surface: Dirt
- Track: left-handed
- Qualification: Three-years-old, open
- Weight: Assigned
- Purse: $100,000

The Dancing Count Stakes is an American Thoroughbred horse race held in January at Laurel Park Racecourse in Laurel, Maryland. It is open to three-year-olds and is run at six furlongs on dirt.

An ungraded stakes, it offers a purse of $100,000. The Dancing Count is also one of Maryland's Triple Crown prep races. The winner of this race typically moves on to compete in the Private Terms Stakes held in March at Laurel Park Racecourse as well, but winners have also ventured off to New York and Kentucky for their next races.

The race was named in honor of one of Maryland's top stallions, Northern Dancer's son Dancing Count, who sired more than 20 graded stakes winners. His progeny include three-time Maryland Million Ladies winner Countus In. Another daughter, Count On Bonnie, was the dam of Wclipse champion Hansel, who won the 1991 Preakness Stakes and Belmont Stakes. Dancing Count stood his final years at Shamrock Farm and died in April 1994 at age 26.

== Records ==
Speed record:

- 6 furlongs - 1:09.79 - Russell Road (2009)
- 7 furlongs - 1:23.20 - Can't Be Denied (1994)

Most wins by an owner:

- no owner has the Dancing Count Stakes more than once

Most wins by a jockey:

- 4 - Edgar Prado (1991, 1993, 1998 & 1999)

Most wins by a trainer:

- 2 - Gary Capuano (2006 & 2011)
- 2 - Dale Capuano (1998 & 2002)
- 2 - Carlos A. Garcia (1993 & 1994)

== Winners of the Dancing Count Stakes since 1985 ==
Year	Winner	Age	Jockey	Trainer	Owner	Distance	Time	Purse
2015	No Race	-	No Race	No Race	No Race	no race	no race	no race
2014	No Race	-	No Race	No Race	No Race	no race	no race	no race
2013	No Race	-	No Race	No Race	No Race	no race	no race	no race
2012	Beggarthyneighbor	3	Malcolm Franklin	Chad C. Brown	Klaravich Stables, Inc.	6 fur.	1:09.80	$100,000
2011	Wicked Thunder	3	Josean Ramirez	Gary Capuano	G. Capuano & Paul Fowler	6 fur.	1:11.76	$75,000
2010	No Race *	-	No Race *	No Race *	No Race *	no race	no race	no race
2009	Russell Road	3	Travis Dunkelberger	James W. Casey	Mark Russell	6 fur.	1:09.79	$75,000
2008	Vanderkaay	3	Rosie Napravnik	A. Ferris Allen	Bowman Thoroughbreds	6 fur.	1:10.60	$60,000
2007	Heart Throbbin'	3	Ryan Fogelsonger	King T. Leatherbury	One and Won Stable	5.5 fur.	1:06.20	$75,000
2006	Great Seneca	3	Heracio Karamanos	Gary Capuano	Carey K. Miller	5.5 fur.	1:05.20	$75,000
2005	More Smoke	3	Mario Pino	John Zimmerman	Tom McClay & Harry Nye	6 fur.	1:11.80	$50,000
2004	Kiowa Prince	3	Abe Castellano, Jr.	Phil Schoenthal	Edward M. Warner	6 fur.	1:11.40	$50,000
2003	Philadelphia Jim	3	Ramon Dominguez	John J. Robb	Anastasia Yarov	6 fur.	1:10.40	$50,000
2002	President Butler	3	Travis Dunkelburger	Dale Capuano	President Butler	6 fur.	1:12.20	$55,000
2001	Sea of Green	3	Ramon Dominguez	Janice Gerace	Janice Gerace	6 fur.	1:11.60	$55,000
2000	Gangsta Rap	3	Christopher Decarlo	Joseph Aquilino	Jim Knee	6 fur.	1:10.80	$55,000
1999	Mr. Katowice	3	Edgar Prado	Robert W. Camac	Russell Racing Stables	6 fur.	1:10.80	$55,000
1998	Just Call Me Carl	3	Edgar Prado	Dale Capuano	Charles W. McNeely	6 fur.	1:10.40	$55,000
1997	Balanced Budget	3	Mario Pino	Edmond D. Gaudet	Edmond D. Gaudet	6 fur.	1:11.40	$55,000
1996	In Contention	3	Anthony Black	Cythia G. Reece	Harry and Tom Meyerhof	7 fur.	1:24.00	$30,000
1995	Onto Luck	3	Rick Wilson	Edward T. Allard	Not Found	7 fur.	1:24.20	$55,000
1994	Can't Be Denied	3	Rick Wilson	Carlos A. Garcia	Dale Lucas	7 fur.	1:23.20	$55,000
1993	Wolf Prince	3	Edgar Prado	Carlos A. Garcia	Jack and Art Preston	7 fur.	1:24.60	$40,000
1992	Noholmes Barred	3	Larry Saumell	Richard E. Dutrow	Eugene Ford	6 fur.	1:11.00	$40,000
1991	Colonel Hill	3	Edgar Prado	Howard Wolfendale	Vic DiVivo	6 fur.	1:10.60	$40,000
1990	Wooden Injun	3	Marco Castaneda	Carlos Garcia	David Hayden	6 fur.	1:11.00	$40,000
1989	Diamond Donnie	3	Greg Hutton	Horace C. Parker		6 fur.	1:10.40	$55,000
1988	Finder's Choice	3	Kent Desormeaux			6 fur.	1:11.00	$50,000
1987	Baldski's Choice	3	Ben Feliciano	Bernard P. Bond	Sam Pistorio	6 fur.	1:13.20	$50,000
1986	Mike Cantwell	3	Allen Stacy			6 fur.	1:11.80	$50,000
1985	Along Came Jones	3	Greg Hutton			1 mile	1:38.00	$30,000

* On January 30, 2010 Racing Secretary Georganne Hale reported that the entire Saturday card at Laurel Park would be canceled due to 6.5" of snow and ice. Later that afternoon she reported that the running of the Dancing Count Stakes had been cancelled for this year and would not be carded anytime in 2010.

== See also ==
- Dancing Count Stakes top three finishers
- Laurel Park Racecourse
