= Barbaro Stakes =

The Barbaro stakes is an American Thoroughbred horse race:

- Barbaro Stakes at Pimlico Race Course (formerly the Sir Barton Stakes at Pimlico Race Course)
- Barbaro Stakes at Delaware Park
