= Deputed Testamony Stakes =

- Class: Ungraded Stakes
- Location: Laurel Park Racecourse, Laurel, Maryland, United States or Pimlico Race Course, Baltimore, Maryland, United States
- Inaugurated: 1986
- Race type: Thoroughbred - Flat racing
- Website: www.laurelpark.com

Race information
- Distance: 1 1/16 miles (8.5 furlongs)
- Surface: Dirt
- Track: left-handed
- Qualification: Three-years-old, Registered Maryland-breds
- Weight: Assigned
- Purse: $100,000

The Deputed Testamony Stakes is an American Thoroughbred horse race held in February at Laurel Park Racecourse in Laurel, Maryland. It is open to Maryland-bred three-year-olds and is run at one mile (8 furlongs) on the dirt. The race was run for the 28th time in 2012.

An ungraded stakes, it offers a purse of $100,000. The Deputed Testamony Stakes is also one of Maryland's Triple Crown prep races. The winner of the race typically moves on to compete in the Private Terms Stakes held in March at Laurel Park Racecourse as well, but winners have also gone to New York and Kentucky for their next races.

The race was named in honor of Deputed Testamony, the 1983 Preakness Stakes winner and the last Maryland-bred champion three-year-old colt. Deputed Testamony was the son of Traffic Cop out of the mare Proof Requested. Traffic Cop was standing at Bonita Farm, so Deputed Testamony was bred, born, raced, retired, stood and pensioned at the same farm. He was bred and owned by his trainer, J. William (Bill) Boniface.

On Preakness Day 1984, Deputed Testamony won the City of Baltimore Handicap and set a new track record for 1 1/16 miles in 1:40.40. That race was the colt's final start. He was then retired to stud duty at Bonita Farm. He made twenty trips to the post in his career and won eleven times with four seconds and earnings of $674,324. Deputed Testamony became one of Maryland's top sires. He was pensioned from stud duty after the 2004 breeding season and died at Bonita Farm on September 18, 2012 at 32 years of age.

== Records ==
Speed record:

- 1 1/16 miles - 1:44.80 - Magic Weisner (2002)
- 1 1/8 miles - 1:49.20 - Acres (2000)

Most wins by an owner:

- no owner has won the Deputed Testamony Stakes more than once

Most wins by a jockey:

- 2 - Edgar Prado (1994 & 1997)

Most wins by a trainer:

- no trainer has the Deputed Testamony Stakes more than once

== Winners of the Deputed Testamony Stakes since 1986 ==
Year	Winner	Age	Jockey	Trainer	Owner	Distance	Time	Purse
2022	Ridin With Biden	4	Frankie Pennington	Robert Reid Jr.	Cash Is King LLC & LC Racing	1 1/8	1:50.30	$100,000
2021	Harper's First Ride	5	Angel Cruz	Claudio Gonzalez	GMP Stables, Arnold Bennewith and Cypress Creek Equine	1 1/8	1:49.52	$100,000
2020	No Race	-	No Race	No Race	No Race	no race	0:00.00	no race
2019	No Race	-	No Race	No Race	No Race	no race	0:00.00	no race
2018	No Race	-	No Race	No Race	No Race	no race	0:00.00	no race
2017	No Race	-	No Race	No Race	No Race	no race	0:00.00	no race
2016	No Race	-	No Race	No Race	No Race	no race	0:00.00	no race
2015	Fish Whistler	5	Trevor McCarthy	Kieron Magee	Mark Sitlinger	1 1/16	1:45.14	$35,000
2014	No Race	-	No Race	No Race	No Race	no race	0:00.00	no race
2013	Hello Lover	7	John Bisono	Robert Reid	Linda Newton	1 1/16	1:46.74	$40,000
2012	Bailey's Beach	5	Javier Santiago	Hugh McMahon	Joey P. Stables	1 1/16	1:46.15	$25,000
2011	No Brakes	6	Xavier Perez	Katherine Sancuk	Katherine Sancuk	1 1/16	1:45.88	$25,000
2010	Northpoint Costas	4	Javier Castellano	Dale Capuano	Rob Ry Farm	1 1/16	1:46.44	$25,000
2009	No Race	-	No Race	No Race	No Race	no race	0:00.00	no race
2008	No Race	-	No Race	No Race	No Race	no race	0:00.00	no race
2007	Digger	3	Herachio Karamanos	Richard E. Dutrow, Jr.	Repole Stable	1 mile	1:35.10	$50,000
2006	Ah Day	3	Jonathan Joyce	King T. Leatherbury	Jim Stable	1 mile	1:39.00	$75,000
2005	Legal Control	3	Luis Garcia	Richard W. Small	Robert E. Meyerhoff	1 1/16	1:45.80	$75,000
2004	Jane's Luck	3	J. Z. Santana	James L. Lawrence	Dresden Farm	1 1/16	1:46.60	$75,000
2003	Cherokee's Boy	3	Ryan Fogelsonger	Gary Capuano	ZWP Stable	1 1/16	1:46.20	$75,000
2002	Magic Weisner	3	Phil Teator	Nancy H. Alberts	Nancy H. Alberts	1 1/16	1:44.80	$75,000
2001	Ronnie's Hot Rod	3	Carlos Marquez	Rodney Jerkins	Team 26	1 1/8	1:54.60	$75,000
2000	Acres	3	Tommy Turner	Ben W. Perkins, Jr.	New Farm	1 1/8	1:49.20	$75,000
1999	Smart Guy	3	David Appleby	Tim Ritchey	Good Fellas Stables Inc.	1 1/8	1:50.60	$75,000
1998	Raghib	3	Frank Lovato	Kiaran McLaughlin	Shadwell Stable	1 1/8	1:50.60	$75,000
1997	Two Smart	3	Edgar Prado	H. Graham Motion	R. Larry Johnson	1 1/8	1:50.80	$75,000
1996	Foolish Pole	3	William McCauley	Virgil Raines	Anderson Fowler	1 1/8	1:49.80	$75,000
1995	Sam's Quest	3	Steve Hamilton	Francis Campitelli		1 1/8	1:50.20	$75,000
1994	Dixie Power	3	Edgar Prado	Lawrence E. Murray	Sondra & Howard Bender	1 1/8	1:52.40	$75,000
1993	Chip's Dancer	3	Clarence Ladner	Jerald Ferris	Charles J. Reed	1 1/8	1:50.40	$75,000
1992	John the Bold	3	Larry Reynolds	J. William Boniface	Margaret & Jim McKay	1 1/8	1:50.80	$75,000
1991	Gala Spinaway	3	Greg McCarron	Bernard Bond	Gertrude & Skip Leviton	1 1/8	1:50.00	$75,000
1990	Baron de Vaux	3	Joe Rocco		Dormello Stud	1 1/8	1:50.60	$75,000
1989	Northern Wolf	3	Clarence Ladner		Deep Silver Stable	1 1/8	1:48.80	$75,000
1988	Bullhorn	3	Donnie Miller			1 1/8	1:50.60	$65,000
1987	Landaura	3	Kent Desormeaux			1 1/16	1:46.60	$60,000
1986	Pilgram Prince	3	Thomas Kupfer			1 1/16	1:46.20	$60,000

== See also ==
- Deputed Testamony Stakes "top three finishers"
- Laurel Park Racecourse
