= Sir Barton Stakes top three finishers and starters =

This is a listing of the horses that finished in either first, second, or third place and the number of starters in the Sir Barton Stakes, an American stakes race for three-year-olds at 1-1/16 miles on dirt held at Pimlico Race Course in Baltimore, Maryland.

Year	Winner	Second	Third	Starters
2026	Big Cuddle	Final Story	Minorinconvenience	6
2025	Crudo	Just a Fair Shake	Invictus	7
2024	Corporate Power	Gould’s Gold	Imperial Gun	8
2023	Arabian Lion	Tapit’s Conquest	Denington	5
2022	Ethereal Road	B Dawk	Mr Jefferson	8
2021	The King Cheek	Hozier	Romp	5
2020	No Race	No Race	No Race	-
2019	King for a Day	Tone Broke	V. I. P. Ticket	6
2018	Ax Man	Title Ready	Prince Lucky	7
2017	No Mo Dough	Time to Travel	True Timber	10
2016	American Freedom	Voluntario	Dazzling Gem	11
2015	Fame and Power	Bold Conquest	Donworth	8
2014	Class Leader	Life in Shambles	Six Spot	9
2013	No Race	No Race	No Race	0
2012	No Race	No Race	No Race	0
2011	No Race	No Race	No Race	0
2010	No Race	No Race	No Race	0
2009	Our Edge	It Happened Again	Denver	11
2008	Roman Emperor	Da' Tara	Spurrier	6
2007	Chelokee	Silver Express	Zephyr Cat	6
2006	High Cotton	Ultimate Goal	Little Cliff	7
2005	Pinpoint	Smokescreen	Killenaule	8
2004	Royal Assault	Dashboard Drummer	Humorously	9
2003	Best Minister	During	Penobscot Bay	9
2002	Sarava	Shah Jahan	No Pressure	n/a
2001	Burning Roma	Mi Amigo Guelo	It's So Simple	n/a
2000	Broken Vow	Grundlefoot	Inner Harbour	n/a
1999	Lead Em Home	Raire Standard	Stellar Brush	n/a
1998	Thomas Jo	Silver Launch	Swear by Dixie	n/a
1997	Two Smart	Valid Direction	Tejano Couture	n/a
1996	Saratoga Dandy	Firm Dancer	Stackhouse	n/a
1995	Mighty Magee *	Star Trace *	Kresa	n/a
1994	Kayacan	Silver Profile	Private High	n/a
1993	Raglan Road	Premier Commander	Bounding Daisy	n/a

A * designates that the race ended in a Deadheat for first in 1995.
