= Horatius Stakes =

- Class: Discontinued stakes
- Location: Laurel Park Racecourse, Laurel, Maryland, United States
- Inaugurated: 1994
- Race type: Thoroughbred - Flat racing
- Website: www.laurelpark.com

Race information
- Distance: 6 furlongs
- Surface: Dirt
- Track: left-handed
- Qualification: Three-year-olds
- Weight: Assigned
- Purse: $60,000

The Horatius Stakes was an American Thoroughbred horse race held in March at Laurel Park Racecourse in Laurel, Maryland. Open to three-year-old horses, it was contested over a distance of six furlongs on dirt.

An ungraded stakes, it offered a purse of $60,000. The race itself was named in honor of the horse that was given his name by his breeder after the legendary Roman hero Horatius. The colt was a huge son out of Proudest Roman and True Charm that proved to be worthy on his moniker. Horatius was a solid stakes winner but his true claim to fame came as one of Maryland's greatest sires of all time. Bred by Colonel W. Randolph Taylor, Horatius was born in Florida in 1975 and was sold for $20,000 as a two-year-old to Dr. Philip J. Torsey, who campaigned his stable's star for five years. During his racing career, Horatius made 54 starts winning 19 and placing second in 17 others. His six stakes wins were spread out among many conditions including; on the dirt, on the turf, sprinting and going long. His wins included the Grade 3 Riggs Handicap and a course setting performance in the Red Bank Handicap. He retired with career earnings of $403,899.

Horatius was retired to stud at Thornmar Farm in Chestertown, Maryland in 1980 as the property of a large syndicate. He achieved his greatest glory with his daughter, Eclipse award-winning sprinter Safely Kept, winner of the 1990 Grade 1 Breeders' Cup Sprint. One of his other graded stakes winners was Oliver's Twist, the runner-up in the 1995 Grade 1 Preakness Stakes. Horatius was retired from stud and pensioned in 2001; he died in his sleep five years later at age 31 in his paddock at Thornmar in February 2006.

== Race Records ==
Speed record:

- 1:09.00 @ 6 furlongs: Deadline (2003)
- 1:22.60 @7 furlongs: Perfect Score (1999)

Most wins by a jockey:

- 2 - Mark T. Johnston (1999, 2002)
- 2 - Rick Wilson (1995, 2003)

Most wins by a trainer:

- 2 - Grover G. Delp (1997, 1999)

== Winners ==
| Year | Winner | Age | Jockey | Trainer | Owner | Dist. (Furlongs) | Time | Purse$ | Gr. |
|---|---|---|---|---|---|---|---|---|---|
| 2008 | Vanderkaay | 3 | Rosie Napravnik | A. Ferris Allen | Bowman Thoroughbreds | 6 fur. | 1:10.60 | $60,000 | |
| 2007 | Call Me Cash | 3 | Jeremy Rose | Scott A. Lake | Gerard Artz | 6 fur. | 1:10.40 | $70,000 | |
| 2006 | Ah Day | 3 | Ryan Fogelsonger | King T. Leatherbury | Jim Stable | 6 fur. | 1:11.20 | $50,000 | |
| 2005 | Diamond Wildcat | 3 | Mario Pino | Ben W. Perkins Jr. | New Farm | 6 fur. | 1:11.80 | $50,000 | |
| 2004 | Basketball Court | 3 | Ramon Dominguez | Henry Walters | Ginny Stack | 6 fur. | 1:10.80 | $40,000 | |
| 2003 | Deadline | 3 | Rick Wilson | John Salzman | Timothy Whitehead | 6 fur. | 1:09.00 | $50,000 | |
| 2002 | Outstander | 3 | Mark T. Johnston | Rodney Jenkins | | 7 fur. | 1:24.00 | $40,000 | |
| 2001 | My Golden Son | 3 | Harry Vega | Michael Wright Jr. | Shahina Ahmad | 6 fur. | 1:11.00 | $55,000 | |
| 2000 | Chief J Strongbow | 3 | Mario Verge | Lynda Knee | | 7 fur. | 1:24.40 | $55,000 | |
| 1999 | Perfect Score | 3 | Mark T. Johnston | Grover G. Delp | Jason & Shannon Inkster | 7 fur. | 1:22.60 | $55,000 | |
| 1998 | Running Copelan | 3 | Carlos Cruz | John Servis | Harry T. Mangurian Jr. | 7 fur. | 1:24.60 | $55,000 | |
| 1997 | Saintly | 3 | Carlos H. Marquez Jr. | Grover G. Delp | Allaire du Pont | 7 fur. | 1:24.00 | $25,000 | |
| 1996 | Count On Numbers | 3 | C. Omar Klinger | Carlos A. Garcia | Not Found | 7.5 fur. | 1:30.60 | $50,000 | |
| 1995 | Dakota's Trick | 3 | Rick Wilson | Edward T. Allard | Not Found | 7.5 fur. | 1:31.60 | $30,000 | |
| 1994 | Run Alden | 3 | Allen T. Stacy | John J. Robb | Hal C. B. Clagett | 6 fur. | 1:10.60 | $35,000 | |

== See also ==
- Horatius Stakes top three finishers
