= Maryland Million Nursery Stakes =

American thoroughbred horse race

- Class: Restricted State-bred stakes
- Location: Laurel Park Racecourse, Laurel, Maryland, United States
- Inaugurated: 1986
- Race type: Thoroughbred - Flat racing
- Website: www.marylandthoroughbred.com/newsindex.php?articleid=953

Race information
- Distance: (7 furlongs)
- Surface: Dirt
- Track: left-handed
- Qualification: Two-year-olds
- Purse: $102,000

Maryland Million Nursery Stakes is an American Thoroughbred horse race held annually in October since 1986 primarily at Laurel Park Racecourse in Laurel, Maryland or at Pimlico Race Course in Baltimore. To be eligible for the Maryland Million Nursery, a horse must be sired by a stallion who stands in Maryland. Due to that, the race is classified as a Restricted stakes race and is not eligible for grading by the American Graded Stakes Committee.

The race is part of Maryland Million Day, a 12-race program held in mid October that was the creation of renowned television sports journalist Jim McKay. The "Maryland Million" is the first State-Bred showcase event ever created. Since 1986, 27 other events in 20 states have imitated the showcase and its structure.

At its inception in 1986 the race was run at one mile. In 1987 and 1989 through 1992, 2001, 2002, and 2004 the race was run at 6 furlongs. In addition to the prize money, the winning owner receives a Maryland Million Waterford Crystal bowl.

In its 30th running in 2015, the race was restricted to those horses who were sired by a stallion who stands in the state of Maryland. Both the entrant horse and their stallion had to be nominated to the Maryland Million program.

== Records ==
Speed record:

- 6 furlongs : 1:09.22 - Tobaggan Slide (2009)
- 7 furlongs : 1:23.17 - Polish Rifle (2003)

Most wins by an owner:

- 2 - Eugene Ford (1996, 2005)

Most wins by a jockey:

- 3 - Ryan Fogelsonger (2002, 2004, 2007)

Most wins by a trainer:

- 3 - H. Graham Motion (1996, 2005, 2017)

== Winners ==
| Yr | Winner | Age | Jockey | Trainer | Owner | Dist. | Time | Purse |
|---|---|---|---|---|---|---|---|---|
| 2024 | Do It for Michael | 2 | Xavier Perez | John J. Robb | No Guts No Glory Farm | 6 fur. | 1:10.57 | $100,000 |
| 2023 | Catahoula Moon | 2 | Xavier Perez | John J. Robb | Super C Racing | 6 fur. | 1:12.24 | $102,030 |
| 2022 | Johnyz From Albany | 2 | Jorge Ruiz | Dale Capuano | Charles J. Reed | 6 fur. | 1:11.35 | $100,000 |
| 2021 | Buff Hello | 2 | Charlie Marquez | Claudio Gonzalez | Joseph Besecker | 6 fur. | 1:10.51 | $100,000 |
| 2020 | Kenny Had A Notion | 2 | Jorge Ruiz | Dale Capuano | Ulman, Louis J. and Glasser, H. Neil | 6 fur. | 1:10.55 | $100,000 |
| 2019 | Ournationonparade | 2 | Inoel Beato | T. Bernard Houghton | Reeves Thoroughbred Racing | 6 fur. | 1:09.73 | $100,000 |
| 2018 | Follow the Dog | 2 | Julian Pimentel | Marya K. Montoya | Waldorf Racing Stables | 6 fur. | 1:10.14 | $100,000 |
| 2017 | Clever Mind | 2 | Nik Juarez | H. Graham Motion | Richard L. Golden | 6 fur. | 1:10.05 | $100,000 |
| 2016 | Greatbullsoffire | 2 | Victor R. Carrasco | Hamilton A. Smith | Kathleen Willier | 6 fur. | 1:11.48 | $100,000 |
| 2015 | Corvus | 2 | Jevian Toledo | Katharine M. Voss | Harrison/Manfuso/Voss | 6 fur. | 1:12.15 | $100,000 |
| 2014 | Golden Years | 2 | Victor Carrasco | Rodney Jenkins | Hillwood Stable LLC | 6 fur. | 1:10.54 | $100,000 |
| 2013 | It's a Bang | 2 | Richard Monterrey | Donald Barr | Walter Vieser II | 6 fur. | 1:10.48 | $100,000 |
| 2012 | Keep Momma Happy | 2 | Carlos Marquez Jr. | Ben Feliciano | Edmund Baxter | 6 fur. | 1:12.76 | $100,000 |
| 2011 | Glib | 2 | Eric Camacho | Jerry Robb | No Guts No Glory St. | 6 fur. | 1:10.95 | $100,000 |
| 2010 | Steady Warrior | 2 | Travis Dunkelberger | Gary Capuano | ZWP Stable | 7 fur. | 1:11.18 | $100,000 |
| 2009 | Toboggan Slide | 2 | Walter Llagas | Daniel T. O'Ryan | Daniel T. O'Ryan | 7 fur. | 1:09.22 | $100,000 |
| 2008 | Juke Joint | 2 | Dale V. Beckner | David DiPietro | R. Legacy Racing Inc. | 7 fur. | 1:26.22 | $150,000 |
| 2007 | Regal Solo | 2 | Ryan Fogelsonger | Linda Albert | E. Allen Murray Jr. | 7 fur. | 1:25.79 | $125,000 |
| 2006 | Clifton Park | 2 | Rosie Napravnik | Bruce C. Jackson | Trade Wind Farms | 7 fur. | 1:25.07 | $125,000 |
| 2005 | Creve Coeur | 2 | Ramon Dominguez | H. Graham Motion | Eugene F. Ford | 7 fur. | 1:26.21 | $100,000 |
| 2004 | What's Up Lonely | 2 | Ryan Fogelsonger | Dale Capuano | Fortunate Stable | 6 fur. | 1:11.72 | $100,000 |
| 2003 | Polish Rifle | 2 | Mario Pino | Anthony Dutrow | Ronald H. Parker | 7 fur. | 1:23.17 | $100,000 |
| 2002 | Cherokee's Boy | 2 | Ryan Fogelsonger | Gary Capuano | ZWP Stables | 6 fur. | 1:11.21 | $100,000 |
| 2001 | Pal's Partner | 2 | Alex Cole | Walter C. Reese | Walter C. Reece | 6 fur. | 1:11.70 | $100,000 |
| 2000 | T P Louie | 2 | Felix L. Ortiz | Martin E. Ciresa | B J Partners | 7 fur. | 1:23.93 | $100,000 |
| 1999 | Darwin | 2 | Rick Wilson | William Badget Jr. | C K Woods Stable | 7 fur. | 1:24.20 | $100,000 |
| 1998 | Pulling Punches | 2 | Mario Verge | Michael J. Moran | Brushwood Stables | 7 fur. | 1:25.40 | $100,000 |
| 1997 | Carnivorous Habit | 2 | Edgar S. Prado | Hamilton A. Smith | Hickory Plainss Farm | 7 fur. | 1:27.00 | $100,000 |
| 1996 | Carrolls Favorite | 2 | Mark Johnston | H. Graham Motion | Eugene F. Ford | 7 fur. | 1:23.60 | $100,000 |
| 1995 | Count On Numbers | 2 | Mark Johnston | Carlos A. Garcia | Herman J. Kassow | 7 fur. | 1:25.60 | $100,000 |
| 1994 | Sam's Quest | 2 | Richard Migliore | Francis P. Campitelli | Frank Giardina | 7 fur. | 1:24.80 | $100,000 |
| 1993 | Run Alden | 2 | Greg W. Hutton | Jerry Robb | Hal C. B. Clagett | 7 fur. | 1:24.00 | $100,000 |
| 1992 | Military Look | 2 | Kent Desormeaux | Charles Hadry | Stuart S. Janney III | 6 fur. | 1:12.00 | $100,000 |
| 1991 | Coolin It | 2 | Luis R. Rivera Jr. | Hubert "Sonny" Hine | Zelda Cohen | 6 fur. | 1:11.40 | $100,000 |
| 1990 | Xray | 2 | Craig Perret | Richard J. Lundy | Allen Paulson | 6 fur. | 1:12.40 | $100,000 |
| 1989 | Real Tough | 2 | Michael Todd Hunter | Sandra Stancer | Sandra Stancer | 6 fur. | 1:10.80 | $100,000 |
| 1988 | Snow King | 2 | Kent Desormeaux | Loren Pate | Sondra Bender | 6 fur. | 1:24.60 | $100,000 |
| 1987 | Sean's Ferrari | 2 | Laffit Pincay Jr. | J. William Boniface | McManus Stable | 6 fur. | 1:12.20 | $100,000 |
| 1986 | First Patriot | 2 | Vincent Bracciale Jr. | H. Allen Jerkens | W. Rickman | 1 mile | 1:37.40 | $100,000 |

== See also ==
- Maryland Million Nursery top three finishers
- Maryland Million Day
- Laurel Park Racecourse
