= Deputed Testamony Stakes top three finishers =

This is a listing (1986–present) of the horses that finished in either first, second, or third place and the number of starters in the Deputed Testamony Stakes, an American stakes race for three-year-olds at one mile on dirt held at Pimlico Race Course in Baltimore, Maryland.

== List ==
Year	Winner	Second	Third	Starters
2015	Fish Whistler	Photogenic	Hideaway Moon	9
2014	Lunar Rock	No Brakes	Regal Warrior	10
2013	Hello Lover	No Brakes	Who Dat Boy	10
2012	Baileys Beach	Strangerinthenight	Albrecht	9
2011	No Brakes	Money for Love	Say Now	n/a
2010	Northpoint Costas	Midnite Communion	Money for Love	n/a
2009	No Race	No Race	No Race	0
2008	No Race	No Race	No Race	0
2007	Digger	Roaring Lion	P V Lightening	n/a
2006	Ah Day	Valid Brush	Two Terms	n/a
2005	Legal Control	Monster Chaser	It's Time to Smile	n/a
2004	Jane's Luck	Andiamo	Water Cannon	n/a
2003	Cherokee's Boy	Foufa's Warrior	Brush Ahead	n/a
2002	Magic Weisner	Invent	Root With Style	n/a
2001	Ronnie's Hot Rod	Allans Money	It's a Problem	n/a
2000	Acres	Inner Harbour	Pickupspeed	n/a
1999	Smart Guy	Scootch	Red Star Rose	n/a
1998	Raghib	P Day	Farwell Look	n/a
1997	Two Smart	Waited	Touch of St. Mary's	n/a
1996	Foolish Pole	Clash by Night	Mixed Count	n/a
1995	Sam's Quest	Flying Punch	Star Trace	n/a
1994	Dixie Power	Cloud's Forty Four	Private High	n/a
1993	Chip's Dancer	Smarten Up Dummy	Dynamic Brush	n/a
1992	John the Bold	Fottage	More Paces	n/a
1991	Gala Spinaway	September Star	A Call to Rise	n/a
1990	Baron de Voux	Fighting Notion	Temper Time	n/a
1989	Northern Wolf	Midas	Gronwold	n/a
1988	Bullhorn	Rolling Cart	Naval Engagement	n/a
1987	Landaura	Silano	Banquet Ticket	n/a
1986	Pilgrim Prince	Warm as Toast	Kalli	n/a

== See also ==
- List of graded stakes at Pimlico Race Course
