= Northern Dancer Stakes =

American Thoroughbred horse race

- Class: Grade III
- Location: Churchill Downs; Louisville, Kentucky, USA
- Inaugurated: 2002
- Race type: Thoroughbred – Flat racing
- Website: www.churchilldowns.com

Race information
- Distance: (1 1/16 miles) (8.5 furlongs)
- Surface: Dirt
- Track: left-handed
- Qualification: Three-year-olds
- Purse: US $125,000 Added

The Northern Dancer Stakes is a discontinued American Thoroughbred horse race that was held annually in mid-June at Churchill Downs in Louisville, Kentucky. It was last run in 2010 with a purse of $125,000.

Named in honor of the horse Northern Dancer, the Grade III stakes for three-year-olds was run on dirt over a distance of 8.5 furlongs (1 1/16 miles).

Canadian-bred and owned honoree Northern Dancer (1961–1990) won the 1964 Kentucky Derby in record time on the Churchill Downs track. He went on to win the Preakness Stakes and Queen's Plate. Retired from racing, Northern Dancer became the most important sire and sire of sires in the second half of the 20th century.

== Winners ==
Year	Winner	Jockey	Trainer	Owner	Time
2010	Colizeo	Garrett Gomez	Todd Pletcher	Wertheimer et Frère	1:43.60
2009	Successful Dan	Julien Leparoux	Charles Lopresti	Morton Fink	1:43.30
2008	Pyro	Shaun Bridgmohan	Steve Asmussen	Winchell Thoroughbreds	1:43.53
2007	Chelokee	Ramon Domínguez	Michael Matz	Centennial Farms	1:42.46
2006	High Cotton	Garrett Gomez	Todd Pletcher	Peachtree Stable	1:43.33
2005	Don't Get Mad	Gary Stevens	Ronald W. Ellis	B. Wayne Hughes	1:42.46
2004	Suave III	Rafael Bejarano	Paul J. McGee	Jay Em Ess Stable	1:44.50
2003	Champali	Pat Day	Gregory Foley	Lloyd Madison Farm	1:34.69
2002	Danthebluegrassman	Jerry Bailey	Bob Baffert	Michael E. Pegram	1:35.04
