= Chelokee =

American-bred Thoroughbred racehorse

- Sire: Cherokee Run
- Grandsire: Runaway Groom
- Dam: Dixie Ghost
- Damsire: Silver Ghost
- Sex: Stallion
- Foaled: 2004
- Country: United States
- Colour: Black
- Breeder: Foley Farms Bloodstock
- Owner: Centennial Farms
- Trainer: Michael Matz
- Record: 10: 5-1-2
- Earnings: US$386,685

Major wins
- Northern Dancer Stakes (2007); Barbaro Stakes (2007)

Chelokee (April 15, 2004 – May 2, 2014) was an American Thoroughbred racehorse.

== Background ==
Bred by Foley Farms Bloodstock, he was sired by multiple stakes winner Cherokee Run. He was out of the mare Dixie Ghost, who is the daughter of Mississippi Dixie by Dixie Bandland, and traces back to Northern Dancer, Nearco and Nashua. He was sold at the 2005 Keeneland Sales for $290,000 to Centennial Farms.

== Racing career ==
At three, Chelokee won the Northern Dancer Breeders Cup Stakes (G3), the inaugural Barbaro Stakes and placed third in the Florida Derby (G1). During the running of the 2008 Alysheba Stakes, Chelokee suffered a career-ending injury, when he slipped and dislocated the sesamoid bones in his right front leg. Chelokee was transported to Rood & Riddle Equine Hospital. The dislocation caused destruction of all of the supporting ligaments to the back of the fetlock and pastern joint, making the ankle unstable and requiring surgery.

Three days after the catastrophic injury Larry Bramlage, DVM, of Rood and Riddle performed a fetlock anthrodesis, fusing the bones to eliminate the fetlock joint. The fusion took a plate 14 inches long and 18 screws to lock it into place with approximately two feet of wire laced into the back of the ankle to replace the ligaments. Dr. Bramlage also put in 12 inches of high-density polyethylene to replace the ligaments in the pastern joint.

== Retirement ==
With his racing career over, Chelokee was sent to stud at Tom Simon’s Vinery in Lexington, Kentucky. Chelokee successfully covered 24 mares in 2009, but having an injury that prevented him to be put out to pasture and a hoof which required a special glue-on shoe and 24-hour care, it was decided that he might be better served in another breeding program.

Chelokee's owner, Centennial Farms decided to donate him to the University of Arizona's Equine Center in Tucson. Chelokee will be utilized in the school's Thoroughbred breeding program, which is part of the University of Arizona Equine Program and the Race Track Industry Program (RTIP).

"Everybody was excited about this plan, because we knew it's a great home and that the students would fall in love with him. He's got a great personality and is a beautiful individual" - Centennial President Don Little Jr

On July 8, 2012 Lady Kee (filly) became the first winner for Chelokee winning by 5 1/2 lengths at Prairie Meadows.

On May 2, 2014, Chelokee was euthanized. The University of Arizona Equine Sciences Program stated on its Facebook page that "The fight was still there but his beautiful body was tired and giving out on him."
