= Richard Small (horse trainer) =

American horse trainer (1945–2014)

Personal information
- Born: December 2, 1945 Baltimore, Maryland
- Died: April 4, 2014 (aged 68) Monkton, Maryland
- Occupation: Trainer / Owner

Horse racing career
- Sport: Horse racing
- Career wins: 1,199

Major racing wins
- John B. Campbell Handicap (1976, 1987, 1998, 2009); Demoiselle Stakes (1977); Black-Eyed Susan Stakes (1978); Mother Goose Stakes (1978); Hilltop Stakes (1978, 1983, 1989, 1998, 2008); Federico Tesio Stakes (1986); Jim Beam Stakes (1986); Meadowlands Cup (1986); Ohio Derby (1986); Spiral Stakes (1986); Pennsylvania Derby (1986, 1991); General George Handicap (1986); Wood Memorial Stakes (1986); Santa Anita Handicap (1987); Suburban Handicap (1987); Trenton Handicap (1987); Beldame Stakes (1989); Gazelle Stakes (1989); Cotillion Handicap (1992); Jennings Handicap (1992); Native Dancer Stakes (1992); Pearl Necklace Stakes (1992, 1998, 2004, 2008); Twixt Stakes (1992, 1993, 2004, 2008); Maryland Million Distaff Handicap (1993); Philip H. Iselin Stakes (1993); All Brandy Stakes (1994, 1996, 2006); Arkansas Derby (1994); Conniver Stakes (1994, 2000,2011); Tempted Stakes (1994); Private Terms Stakes (1994, 2007); Californian Stakes (1995); New Orleans Handicap (1995); Selima Stakes (1998); Barbaro Stakes (1999); Ohio Derby (1999); Violet Handicap (1999); Maryland Racing Media Stakes (2000, 2006); Squan Song Stakes (2004, 2005, 2007); Wide Country Stakes (2004); Deputed Testamony Stakes (2005); Maryland Million Oaks (2005); Monmouth Beach Stakes (2008); Geisha Handicap (2010) Breeders' Cup wins: Breeders' Cup Classic (1994)

Significant horses
- Broad Brush, Caesar's Wish, Concern, Richard's Kid, Valley Crossing

Richard W. "Dickie" Small (December 2, 1945 – April 4, 2014) was an American Thoroughbred horse racing trainer. Raised in the industry, his father, Douglas Small Jr., was a successful trainer as was his uncle, Sidney Watters Jr., a National Museum of Racing and Hall of Fame inductee.

Richard Small learned the business from his father but the Vietnam War temporarily interrupted his career when he served three years with the army Green Berets. Following his discharge from military service, he returned to take over his father's stable in 1974.

A highlight of Small's career was his 1994 win of the $3 million Breeders' Cup Classic with Concern. Ridden by Jerry Bailey, the three-year-old colt was owned and bred by Robert Meyerhoff.

Small won 1,199 races over a 40-year career, including the 1994 Breeders' Cup Classic. He died at his Monkton, Maryland home at the age of 68 in 2014.
