= 2002 Preakness Stakes =

127th running of the Preakness Stakes

127th Preakness Stakes
- The Preakness Stakes
- "The Middle Jewel of the Triple Crown" "The Run for the Black-Eyed Susans"
- Location: Pimlico Race Course, Baltimore, Maryland, United States
- Date: May 18, 2002
- Winning horse: War Emblem
- Jockey: Victor Espinoza
- Trainer: Bob Baffert
- Conditions: Fast
- Surface: Dirt

The 2002 Preakness Stakes was the 127th running of the Preakness Stakes thoroughbred horse race. The race took place on May 18, 2002, and was televised in the United States on the NBC television network. War Emblem, who was jockeyed by Victor Espinoza, won the race by three quarters of a length over runner-up Magic Weisner. Approximate post time was 6:12 p.m. Eastern Time. The race was run over a fast track in a final time of 1:56.36. The Maryland Jockey Club reported total attendance of 117,055, this is recorded as second highest on the list of American thoroughbred racing top attended events for North America in 2002.

== Payout ==
The 127th Preakness Stakes Payout Schedule

Program Number	Horse Name	Win	Place	Show
8	War Emblem	$7.60	$6.00	$4.40
2	Magic Weisner	-	$33.00	$14.00
12	Proud Citizen	-	-	$5.00

- $2 Exacta: (8–2) paid $327.00
- $2 Trifecta: (8–2–12) paid $2,311.00
- $1 Superfecta: (8–2–12–6) paid $6,701.50

== The full chart ==
Finish Position	Margin (lengths)	Post Position	Horse name	Jockey	Trainer	Owner	Post Time Odds	Purse Earnings
1st	0	8	War Emblem	Victor Espinoza	Bob Baffert	The Thoroughbred Corporation	2.80-1 favorite	$650,000
2nd	3/4	2	Magic Weisner	Richard Migliore	Nancy H. Alberts	Nancy H. Alberts	45.70-1	$200,000
3rd	1 1/2	12	Proud Citizen	Mike E. Smith	D. Wayne Lukas	Robert Baker & David Cornstein	7.40-1	$100,000
4th	3	6	Harlan's Holiday	Edgar Prado	Kenneth McPeek	Starlight Stable	5.20-1	$50,000
5th	3 3/4	7	Easyfromthegitgo	Donnie Meche	Steve Asmussen	J. Cassel & B.Zollars	23.40-1	
6th	10 3/4	1	U S S Tinosa	Kent Desormeaux	Jerry Hollendorfer	Peter Abruzzo & Barry Thiriot	10.20-1	
7th	17-1/4	4	Crimson Hero	Chris McCarron	Nicholas P. Zito	Tracy Farmer	14.80-1	
8th	17 3/4	5	Medaglia d'Oro	Jerry D. Bailey	Robert J. Frankel	Edmund A. Gann	3.00-1	
9th	20 3/4	3	Straight Gin	Robby Albarado	Nicholas P. Zito	Marylou Whitney Stable	28.00-1	
10th	27 1/2	11	Menacing Dennis	Mario Pino	Jeffrey L. Bonde	Jmj Racing Stables	51.20-1	
11th	27 3/4	9	Table Limit	Gary Stevens	D. Wayne Lukas	Overbrook Farm	23.10-1	
12th	28 1/4	10	Booklet	Pat Day	John T. Ward, Jr.	John C. Oxley	9.90-1	
13th	28 3/4	13	Equality	Ramon A. Dominguez	H. Graham Motion	Pin Oak Stable	27.50-1	

- Winning Breeder: Charles Nuckols, Jr. & Sons; (KY)
- Final Time: 1:56.36
- Track Condition: Fast
- Total Attendance: 117,055

== See also ==
- 2002 Kentucky Derby
- 2002 Belmont Stakes
