= Private Terms Stakes top three finishers =

This is a listing of the horses that finished in either first, second, or third place and the number of starters in the Private Terms Stakes, an American stakes race for three-year-olds at 1-1/8 miles on dirt. It is considered the key Triple Crown Prep Race held at Laurel Park Racecourse in Laurel, Maryland. (List 1990–present)

Year	Winner	Second	Third	Starters
2022				-
2021	Shackled Love	MaytheHorseBwithu	Excellorator	7
2020	Lebda	My Friends Beer	Mine Not Mine	8
2019	Alwaysmining	Joevia	Tybalt	7
2018	V. I. P. Code	Forest Fire	Dynamic Asset	7
2017	Twisted Tom	O Dionysus	Dharmaster	7
2015	Abiding Star	Flash McCaul	Whiskey Tree	6
2015	Bridget's Big Luvy	Bodhisattva	Net Gain	6
2014	Kid Cruz	Joint Custody	Matuszak	10
2013	Mr. Palmer	Battier	Seventeenohsix	10
2012	Raconteur	Hakama	Brimstone Island	9
2011	Bandbox	Rush Now	No Easy Answer	6
2010	Plantation	Reckless Runner	Regal Warrior	7
2009	St. John's Gospel	Not for Silver	Hehasnosay	n/a
2008	Double or Nothing	Regal Solo	Vanderkaay	n/a
2007	Etude	Saratoga Lulaby	Not for Money	n/a
2006	Our Peak	Ah Day	Sunshine Alpine	n/a
2005	Malibu Moonshine	Hello Jerry	Monster Chaser	n/a
2004	Water Cannon	Acclimate	Major Tanner	n/a
2003	Sky Soldier	Skycrossing	Moses Jerome	n/a
2002	Magic Weisner	The Slewickley Kid	Root With Style	n/a
2001	Bay Eagle	Marciano	Charlie's Cards	n/a
2000	Pickupspeed	Connect	Inner Harbour	n/a
1999	Hary's Halo	Seven Pipers	Lead Em Home	n/a
1998	Monk's Falcon	Sparton Cat	Find the Facts	n/a
1997	Dr. Best	Fearless Play	Cryptocloser	n/a
1996	Mixed Count	Shananie's Wish	Silver Dollar Kids	n/a
1995	Flying Punch	Oliver's Twist	He's Got Gall	n/a
1994	Looming	Justalittleshower	Wise Judgement	n/a
1993	Chip's Dancer	Bounding Daisy	Asset Impression	n/a
1992	Ameri Valay	Exit West	America the Free	n/a
1991	Haymaker	Colonel Hill	He Is Rise	n/a
1990	Baron de Vaux	Flying Feet	Will Lacy	n/a
