= Sir Barton Stakes (USA) =

- Class: Ungraded Stakes
- Location: Pimlico Race Course, Baltimore, Maryland, United States
- Inaugurated: 1993
- Race type: Thoroughbred - Flat racing
- Website: https://www.pimlico.com/

Race information
- Distance: 1 1/16 miles (8.5 furlongs)
- Surface: Dirt
- Track: left-handed
- Qualification: Three-year-olds
- Weight: Assigned
- Purse: $100,000

The Sir Barton Stakes is an American ungraded Thoroughbred horse race for three-year-olds over a distance of 1 1/16 miles held at Pimlico Race Course in Baltimore, Maryland. The race offers a purse of $100,000.

It is run as part of the undercard for the Preakness Stakes, the second leg of the U.S. Triple Crown series.

== History ==
The race is named for the U.S. Racing Hall of Fame colt Sir Barton, who was the 1st U.S. Triple Crown Champion.

The 8.5-furlong ungraded stakes race was renamed from 2007 to 2008 for the 2006 Kentucky Derby winner, Barbaro, who suffered an injury in the 2006 Preakness Stakes that ultimately cost him his life.

== Records ==
Speed record:

- 1 1/16 miles - 1:41.13 Arabian Lion (2023)

Most wins by an owner:

- 2 - R. Larry Johnson (1995, 1997)
- 2 - Paraneck Stable (1996, 2009)

Most wins by a jockey:

- 3 - Edgar Prado (1997, 2002, 2003)
- 3 - John R. Velazquez (2019, 2023, 2025)

Most wins by a trainer:

- 4 - H. Graham Motion (1995, 1997, 2000, 2017)
- 4 - Nick Zito (1996, 2004, 2005, 2009)
- 4 - Bob Baffert (2015, 2016, 2018, 2023)

== Winners of the Sir Barton Stakes since 1993 ==
Year	Winner	Jockey	Trainer	Owner	Distance	Time	Purse
2026	Big Cuddle	Yedsit Hazlewood	Gary Capuano	Pocket's 3 Racing LLC	1-1/16	1:44.77	$100,000
2025	Crudo	John R. Velazquez	Todd A. Pletcher	Bobby Flay & James Ventura	1-1/16	1:44.00	$100,000
2024	Corporate Power	Javier Castellano	Claude R. McGaughey III	Courtlandt Farms	1-1/16	1:44.98	$100,000
2023	Arabian Lion	John R. Velazquez	Bob Baffert	Zedan Racing Stables	1-1/16	1:41.13	$100,000
2022	Ethereal Road	Luis Saez	D. Wayne Lukas	Aaron Sones	1-1/16	1:43.20	$100,000
2021	The King Cheek	Jamie Rodriguez	Jamie Ness	Morris E. Kernan Jr.	1-1/16	1:42.81	$100,000
2020	Race not held						
2019	King for a Day	John R. Velazquez	Todd Pletcher	Red Oak Stable	1-1/16	1:41.40	$100,000
2018	Ax Man	Mike E. Smith	Bob Baffert	Earnhardt III, Patti and Hal J.	1-1/16	1:42.53	$100,000
2017	No Mo Dough	Jose L. Ortiz	H. Graham Motion	Alex G. Campbell Jr.	1-1/16	1:44.13	$100,000
2016	American Freedom	Florent Geroux	Bob Baffert	Gary & Mary West	1-1/16	1:44.85	$100,000
2015	Fame and Power	Martin Garcia	Bob Baffert	Juddmonte Farms	1-1/16	1:41.67	$100,000
2014	Class Leader	James Graham	Neil Howard	Lane's End Racing	1-1/16	1:43.79	$100,000
2009–13	Race not held						
2008	Roman Emperor	Jeremy Rose	Steve Klesaris	Puglisi Stables	1-1/16	1:45.60	$100,000
2007	Chelokee	Ramon Dominguez	Michael Matz	Centennial Farms	1-1/16	1:43.40	$100,000
2006	High Cotton	Garrett Gomez	Todd A. Pletcher	Peachtree Stable	1-1/16	1:42.80	$100,000
2005	Pinpoint	Rafael Bejarano	Nick Zito	Smoke & Mirrors Racing	1-1/16	1:44.40	$100,000
2004	Royal Assault	Pat Day	Nick Zito	Tracy Farmer	1-1/16	1:45.60	$100,000
2003	Best Minister	Edgar Prado	Kenneth G. McPeek	Dinesh Maniar	1-1/16	1:43.80	$100,000
2002	Sarava	Edgar Prado	Kenneth G. McPeek	Gary Drake	1-1/16	1:44.00	$100,000
2001	Burning Roma	Rick Wilson	Anthony W. Dutrow	Harold L. Queen	1-1/16	1:44.00	$100,000
2000	Broken Vow	Shane Sellers	H. Graham Motion	Pin Oak Stud	1-1/16	1:43.20	$100,000
1999	Lead Em Home	Kent Desormeaux	Phil Marino	Sandi L. Kleeman	1-1/16	1:43.20	$100,000
1998	Thomas Jo	Steve Hamilton	James A. Jerkens	Earle I. Mack	1-1/16	1:43.00	$100,000
1997	Two Smart	Edgar Prado	H. Graham Motion	R. Larry Johnson	1-1/16	1:43.00	$83,000
1996	Saratoga Dandy	Gary Stevens	Nick Zito	Paraneck Stable	1-1/16	1:44.20	$56,275
†1995	Mighty Magee	Chris McCarron	Leon J. Blusiewicz	Waldorf Farm	1-1/16	1:42.60	$50,000
†1995	Star Trace	L. Reynolds	H. Graham Motion	R. Larry Johnson	1-1/16	1:42.60	$50,000
1994	Kayacan	Garrett Gomez	John B. Secor	Turkeli Farms	1-1/16	1:45.60	$55,575
1993	Raglan Road	Chris McCarron	Leon J. Blusiewicz	Haras Vista Hermosa	1-1/16	1:43.60	$56,000

Note:

- †Dead Heat

== See also ==
- Sir Barton Stakes top three finishers and starters
- List of graded stakes at Pimlico Race Course
