= Maryland Million Ladies Stakes top three finishers =

This is a listing of the horses that finished in either first, second, or third place and the number of starters in the Maryland Million Ladies Stakes, an American State-bred stakes race for fillies & mares three years-old and up at 1-1/8 miles on the turf held at Laurel Park Racecourse in Laurel, Maryland. (List 1986-present)

Year	Winner	Second	Third	Starters
2021	Epic Idea	Maldives Model	Judi Blue Eyes	13
2020	Epic Idea	Gennie Highway	Mosalah	11
2019	Zonda	My Sistersledge	Ghoul's Night Out	10
2018	My Sistersledge	My Vixen	Magician's Vanity	9
2017	My Sistersledge	Great Soul	Nickyrocksforpops	10
2016	Devilish Love	Complete St.	Northern Smile	6
2015	Monster Sleeping	Lucy Boo	Pauline's Pride	8
2014	Bear Access	Devilish Love	Pagan Priestess	10
2013	Monster Sleeping	Daydreamin Gracie	Pagen Priestess	10
2012	Pagan Priestess	Weeper	Dance With Gio	8
2011	Love's Blush	Baltimore Belle	Dream Louise	11
2010	My Sweet Nenana	Love's Blush	Amelia’s Brio	11
2009	Talkin About Love	Beau's Trip	Heavenly Moon	n/a
2008	Miss Lombardi	Debbie Sue	Beau's Trip	n/a
2007	Maddy's Heart	Lexi Star	Beau's Trip	n/a
2006	Debbie Sue	Sticky	Rowdy	n/a
2005	Surf Light	Sassy Love	Rowdy	n/a
2004	Hail Hillary	Rowdy	Love Match	n/a
2003	Hail Hillary	Supposedly	Leebearski	n/a
2002	Shopping For Love	Breezy Bri	Twilights Prayer	n/a
2001	Stal Quest	Purrfect Punch	Canavakiss	n/a
2000	Caveat's Shot	Proud Owner	Chapel	n/a
1999	Vaguely Rich	Proud Run	Northern Flair	n/a
1998	Lonesome Sound	Earth to Jackie	Indian Head Penny	n/a
1997	Only Ali	Sad Refrain	Twofox	n/a
1996	Julie's Brilliance	Reeve's Lib	Raffle	n/a
1995	Mz. Zill Bear	Icy Warning	Gabby's Love	n/a
1994	Mz. Zill Bear	Icy Warning	Verbal Volley	n/a
1993	Mz. Zill Bear	Ratings	Heed	n/a
1992	Richard's Lass	Mz. Zill Bear	Gaylord's Annie	n/a
1991	Countus In	Gaylord's Annie	McKilts	n/a
1990	Countus In	Oh My Pride	Lanzada	n/a
1989	Countus In	Betty Lobelia	Oh My Pride	n/a
1988	Chapel of Dreams	Betty Lobelia	Smart 'n Quick	n/a
1987	Gold Glove	Smart 'n Quick	Chapel of Dreams	n/a
1986	Dismasted	A Joyful Spray	Eta Carinae	n/a

== See also ==
- Maryland Million Ladies Stakes
- Maryland Million Day
- Laurel Park Racecourse
