= Horatius Stakes top three finishers =

This is a listing of the horses that finished in either first, second, or third place and the number of starters in the Horatius Stakes (1994–present), an American Thoroughbred Stakes race for three-year-olds at six furlongs run on dirt at Laurel Park Racecourse in Laurel, Maryland.

Year	Winner	Second	Third	Starters
2015	No Race	No Race	No Race	0
2014	No Race	No Race	No Race	0
2013	No Race	No Race	No Race	0
2012	No Race	No Race	No Race	0
2011	No Race	No Race	No Race	0
2010	No Race	No Race	No Race	0
2009	No Race	No Race	No Race	0
2008	Vanderkaay	Ghostly Thunder	Vigors Storm	n/a
2007	Call Me Clash	Casey Doon	Heart Throbbin'	n/a
2006	Ah Day	Eagle Head	Great Seneca	n/a
2005	Diamond Wildcat	Distinctive Trick	Monster Chaser	n/a
2004	Basketball Court	Matsui	Snow Eagle	n/a
2003	Deadline	Gators N Bears	Mt. Carson	n/a
2002	Outstander	President Butler	Jo Jo Dancer	n/a
2001	My Golden Son	Native Heir	Danny E	n/a
2000	Chief J. Srongbow	Bop	Country Signature	n/a
1999	Perfect Score	Mr. Katowice	Raire Standard	n/a
1998	Running Copelan	Spartan Cat	P Day	n/a
1997	Saintly	Dr. Best	Stormy Cloud	n/a
1996	Count On Numbers	Viv	Irish Cloud	n/a
1995	Dakota's Trick	Carolina Blues	Centurion	n/a
1994	Run Alden	Takeitlikeaman	Justalitleshower	n/a
