= Dancing Count Stakes top three finishers =

This is a listing of the horses that finished in either first, second, or third place and the number of starters in the Dancing Count Stakes, an American stakes race for three-year-olds at six furlongs on dirt held at Laurel Park Racecourse in Baltimore, Maryland. (List 1985–present)

Year	Winner	Second	Third	Starters
2015	No Race	No Race	No Race	-
2014	No Race	No Race	No Race	-
2013	No Race	No Race	No Race	-
2012	Beggarthyneighbor	Trippi's Secret	Ill Conceived	7
2011	Wicked Thunder	Diski Dancer	Afternoon Action	8
2010	No Race	No Race	No Race	0
2009	Russell Road	Great Love	St John's Gospel	n/a
2008	Vanderkaay	Ghostly Thunder	Vigors Storm	n/a
2007	Heart Throbbin'	Place Your Bet	Crafty Bear	n/a
2006	Great Seneca	Ah Day	The Village Vicar	n/a
2005	More Smoke	Timely Impulse	Primal Storm	n/a
2004	Kiowa Prince	Basketball Court	Hands On	n/a
2003	Philadelphia Gym	Gimmeawink	For Gold	n/a
2002	President Butler	Sothern Livin	Coach Knight	n/a
2001	Sea of Green	Faah Emiss	My Golden Sun	n/a
2000	Gangsta Rap	Chief J. Strongbow	Tricky Di	n/a
1999	Mr. Katowice	Twilight Princess	Tom's Revenge	n/a
1998	Just Call Me Carl	Unreal Madness	Running Copelan	n/a
1997	Balanced Budget	For Real Zeal	Anttietam Creek	n/a
1996	In Contention	Viv	Irish Cloud	n/a
1995	Onto Luck	He's Got Gall	Without Remorse	n/a
1994	Can't Be Denied	Run Alden	Popol's Gold	n/a
1993	Wolf Prince	Asset Impression	Without Dissent	n/a
1992	Noholmes Barred	Golden Phase	Rainbow Prospect	n/a
1991	Colonel Hill	Gala Spinaway	Fortunate Lance	n/a
1990	Wooden Injun	Ebonizer	Bardland	n/a
1989	Diamond Donnie	Pulverizing	Assault Party	n/a
1988	Finder's Choice	Cameo Type	Gospel Note	n/a
1987	Baldski's Choice	Judge's Dream	Make Music	n/a
1986	Mike Cantwell	Super Delight	Isopropyl	n/a
1985	Along Came Jones	Bolting Home	Jay Bryan	n/a

* On January 30, 2010, Racing Secretary Georganne Hale reported that the entire Saturday card at Laurel Park would be canceled due to 6.5" of snow and ice. Later that afternoon she reported that the running of the Dancing Count Stakes had been cancelled for this year and would not be carded anytime in 2010.
