= Magic Weisner =

American-bred Thoroughbred racehorse (1999–2026)

- Sire: Ameri Valay
- Grandsire: Carnivalay
- Dam: Jazema
- Damsire: Bold Forbes
- Sex: Gelding
- Foaled: May 3, 1999
- Died: July 2026 (aged 27)
- Country: United States
- Colour: Bay
- Breeder: Nancy H. Alberts
- Owner: Nancy H. Alberts
- Trainer: Nancy H. Alberts
- Record: 15: 7-4-0
- Earnings: $888,830

Major wins
- Maryland Juvenile Champion Stakes (2001); Ohio Derby (2002); Private Terms Stakes (2002); Goss Stryker Stakes (2002); Deputed Testamony Stakes (2002) American Classic Race placing: Preakness Stakes 2nd (2002)
- Last updated on September 15, 2009

Magic Weisner (May 3, 1999 – July 2026) was an American Thoroughbred racehorse. A descendant of Bold Forbes, he was sired by Ameri Valay and bred by Nancy H. Alberts. Magic Weisner was a graded stakes winner but is best remembered for his runner-up finish in the 2002 Preakness Stakes and his serious public battle to overcome West Nile fever when little was known about the disease.

== Two-year-old season ==
Nancy Alberts, also Magic Weisner's owner, trainer, and exercise rider, bred the horse from a mare named Jazema, which she bought as a yearling for $1 because of her crooked legs. In the late 1980s, Alberts lost Jazema twice in claiming races and bought her back both times. The final time she bought her back was for breeding. Alberts had commented that Jazema had a special eye for Ameri Valay because of seeing him around the barn area at Laurel Park. Jazema, in Arabic meant "hope", and in 1998 her first born was named Deliver Hope. In February 1999, Alberts nursed Jazema during some difficult times in the late term of her pregnancy. In May, Magic Weisner foaled at Shamrock Farms under the care of Jim and Christy Steele. Since Alberts didn't own a farm, Magic Weisner was raised at different farms in the Laurel, MD area.

At age two, the colt lost his first two races before breaking his maiden in his third try. He trained at Bowie Race Course and shipped up to Laurel in the summer of 2001 to score his first win. He followed that up with an allowance win in late August of that year. Then Alberts entered Magic Weisner in the Maryland Juvenile Championship Stakes, a nine-furlong dirt race at Laurel Park, which he won. He finished the year with three wins in five starts.

== Three-year-old season ==
Magic Weisner bridged his two- and three-year-old seasons with five straight wins, including victories in the Goss Striker Stakes, the Deputed Testamony Stakes, and the Private Terms Stakes, all at Laurel Park Race Course. In the Federico Tesio Stakes, a race that many locals call the "Preakness Trial" at Pimlico Race Course, he finished second to Smoked Em, a highly regarded three-year-old trained by Todd Pletcher. Alberts felt that jockey Phil Teter didn't listen to her instructions and felt that Magic Weisner could have won the race.

In the 127th Preakness Stakes, Magic Weisner was listed as the second longest shot in a field of thirteen horses, many of them graded stakes winners. The favorites were the top three finishers in the Kentucky Derby and its beaten favorite. War Emblem, Proud Citizen, Medaglia d'Oro, and Harlan's Holiday garnered the vast majority of the public's support. Magic Weisner was listed at 40-1 on the morning line but dropped to 33-1 at post time because of a deep local following and empathy for Alberts' Cinderella story. As the gates opened, speedster Menacing Dennis rushed to the lead, followed b War Emblem and Booklet going into the first turn as Magic Weisner lagged far back in eleventh of thirteen. With three furlongs to go, War Emblem took over the lead, followed closely by Proud Citizen, Madaglia d'Oro, and Harlan's Holiday. In the last 110 yards, Magic Weisner rallied from far back to finish second to War Emblem by a three-quarters of a length.

He returned to run fourth in the grade one Belmont Stakes, losing to longshot Sarava. He then won the grade two Ohio Derby by a neck over Wiseman's Ferry, who carried him very wide, and The Judge Sez Who, who finished third. He next finished second behind War Emblem by three and a half lengths in the grade one Haskell Invitational. Late that year, he contracted the West Nile virus while preparing for the grade two Pennsylvania Derby in Philadelphia, Pennsylvania. During his sophomore season, Magic Weisner either won or placed in six of seven stakes races.

== Four-year-old season ==
Magic Weisner contracted West Nile virus late in 2002 and missed most of the 2003 season. In July 2003 at opening day at Laurel Park Race Course, he returned in a seven-furlong race. Alberts had intended to prime him for the Maryland Million Classic on October 11 at Laurel Park. However, Magic Weisner finished last as the favorite. He never raced again and was retired in May 2005.

== Retirement and death ==
At his retirement, Alberts said, "He looks fine but the West Nile virus just damaged all the nerves around his back and hind quarters. I am sure he'll be able to have another profession. He's at the farm, just trying to get the fitness out of him. I've had a couple people contact me about making him a dressage horse. He is a beautiful mover and sound and he loves to do anything you ask him to do."

Magic Weisner lived with Alberts' sister Linda in Pennsylvania until his retirement, with his longtime paddock mate, Bo's a Ten, to Old Friends in Georgetown, Kentucky in 2020.

Alberts died due to complications from a stroke in 2011. Her only son, Will (will-at-albertsracing.com), took over her horse business. Jazema's last-born filly, Jazema's Ginger (Ginger), by Go For Gin, was bred in 2012.

Magic Weisner died in July 2026, at the age of 27.

== Sources ==
- Pedigee Online, Thoroughbred Database website;
