= Hollywood Futurity top three finishers =

This is a listing of the horses that finished in either first, second, or third place and the number of starters in the Hollywood Futurity, an American Grade 1 race for three-year-olds at 1-1/16 miles on synthetic surface held at Hollywood Park in Hollywood, California. (List 1973–present)

Year	Winner	Second	Third	Starters
2011	Liaison	Rousing Sermon	Brother Francis	13
2010	Comma to the Top	J P's Gusto	Clubhouse Ride	10
2009	Lookin At Lucky	Noble's Promise	Make Music for Me	7
2008	Pioneerof the Nile	I Want Revenge	Chocolate Candy	11
2007	Into Mischief	Colonel John	Massive Drama	12
2006	Stormello	Liquidity	Roman Commander	10
2005	Brother Derek	Your Tent Or Mine	Bob and John	8
2004	Declan's Moon	Giacomo	Wilko	7
2003	Lion Heart	St Averil	That's an Outrage	5
2002	Toccet	Domestic Dispute	Coax Kid	6
2001	Siphonic	Fonz's	Officer	8
2000	Point Given	Millennium Wind	Golden Ticket	4
1999	Captain Steve	High Yield	Cosine	6
1998	Tactical Cat	Prime Timber	Premier Property	5
1997	Real Quiet	Artax	Nationalore	11
1996	Swiss Yodeler	Stolen Gold	In Excessive Bull	13
1995	Matty G	Odyle	Ayrton	7
1994	Afternoon Deelites	Thunder Gulch	A. J. Jett	5
1993	Valiant Nature	Brocco	Flying Sensation	6
1992	River Special	Stuka	Earl of Barking	6
1991	A.P. Indy	Dance Floor	Casual Lies	14
1990	Best Pal	General Meeting	Reign Road	9
1989	Grand Canyon	Farma Way	Silver Ending	9
1988	King Glorious	Music Merci	Hawkster	10
1987	Tejano	Purdue King	Regal Classic	8
1986	Temperate Sil	Alysheba	Masterful Advocate	12
1985	Snow Chief	Electric Blue	Ferdinand	10
1984	Stephan's Odyssey	First Norman	Right Con	13
1983	Fali Time	Bold T. Jay	Life's Magic	12
1982	Roving Boy	Desert Wine	Fifth Division	9
1981	Stalwart	Cassaleria	Header Card	12
