= Maryland Million Ladies Stakes =

- Class: Restricted State-bred Stakes
- Location: Laurel Park Racecourse, Laurel, Maryland, United States
- Inaugurated: 1986
- Race type: Thoroughbred - Flat racing
- Website: Marylandthoroughbred.com

Race information
- Distance: 1 1/8 miles (9 furlongs)
- Surface: Turf
- Track: Left-handed
- Qualification: Three-year-olds & up fillies & mares
- Purse: $125,000

The Maryland Million Ladies Stakes is an American Thoroughbred horse race held annually in October since 1986 primarily at Laurel Park Racecourse in Laurel, Maryland or at Pimlico Race Course in Baltimore. To be eligible for the Maryland Million Ladies, a 3-year-old filly must be sired by a stallion who stands in Maryland. Due to that restriction the race is classified as a non-graded or "listed" stakes race and is not eligible for grading by the American Graded Stakes Committee.

The race is part of Maryland Million Day, a 12-race program held in mid October that was the creation of renowned television sports journalist Jim McKay. The "Maryland Million" is the first State-Bred showcase event ever created. Since 1986, 27 other events in 20 states have imitated the showcase and its structure.

At its inception in 1986 through 1990 the Maryland Million Ladies was run at one and 1/16 mile on turf. The race was run on the main track on dirt in 1992 and 1995. From 1991 to present (with the above exceptions) the race has been run at 1 1/8 miles on the turf.

In its 30th running in 2015, the race is restricted to those horses who were sired by a stallion who stands in the state of Maryland. Both the entrant horse and their stallion must be nominated to the Maryland Million program.

The race itself has had many titles since 1986 due in large part to the aggressive marketing efforts of Maryland Million Limited, the series corporate founder. In its inaugural year (1986) the race was called the "Eskimo Pie Maryland Ladies." From 1987 through 1992 the race was known as the "First National Bank of Maryland Ladies." In 1993 the race was called the "BWI Airport Maryland Ladies" and in 1994-1995 the "USAir Maryland Ladies." From 1997 through 1999 the race was known as the "Carrollton Bank Maryland Ladies and from 2000-2001 it was called the "Kameen Laser Eye Associates Maryland Ladies." In 2004 the race was called the "Susquehanna Bank Maryland Ladies."

== Records ==
Most wins horse:

- 3 - Mz. Zill Bear (1993, 1994, 1995)
- 3 - Countus In (1989, 1990, 1991)

Speed record:

- 9 furlongs: 1:46.86 - Hail Hillary (2003)
- 8.5 furlongs: 1:42 1/5 - Countus In (1989)

Most wins by a jockey:

- 3 - Julie Krone
- 3 - Jeremy Rose

Most wins by a trainer:

- 4 - Dale Capuano (2000, 2001, 2013, 2015)

Most wins by an owner:

- 3 - Mea Culpa Stables
- 3 - Charles G. Middleton III

== Winners ==
Year	Winner	Age	Jockey	Trainer	Owner	Dist. (Miles)	Time	Purse
2024	Circle Home	5	Jevian Toledo	Miguel Vera	Dark Hollow Farm	1-1/8	1:48.10	$125,000
2023	Precious Avary	3	Silvestre Gonzalez	Timothy J. Shaw	Smith Farm and Stable	1-1/8	1:49.53	$125,000
2022	Coconut Cake	5	Sheldon Russell	Timothy Keefe	N R S Stable	1-1/8	1:50.22	$127,500
2021	Epic Idea	5	Daniel Centeno	Michael Merryman	Vivian E. Rall	1-1/8	1:49.46	$102,000
2020	Epic Idea	4	Trevor McCarthy	Ann W. Merryman	Vivian E. Rall	1-1/8	1:55.06	$125,000
2019	Zonda	3	Victor Carrasco	James Lawrence	Matthew Schera	1-1/8	1:50.46	$125,000
2018	My Sistersledge	3	Julian Pimentel	Michael Trombetta	John & Cheryl Banner	1-1/8	1:55.74	$125,000
2017	My Sistersledge	3	Julian Pimentel	Michael Trombetta	John & Cheryl Banner	1-1/8	1:49.92	$125,000
2016	Devilish Love	6	Alex Cintron	Anthony W. Dutrow	Briardale Stable	1-1/8	1:47.69	$125,000
2015	Monster Sleeping	6	Sheldon Russell	Dale Capuano	Charles J. Reed	1-1/8	1:51.39	$125,000
2014	Bear Access	4	Horacio Karamanos	Lawrence E. Murray	Howard Bender	1-1/8	1:54.83	$125,000
2013	Monster Sleeping	4	Jose Garcia	Dale Capuano	Reed J. Charles	1-1/8	1:53.54	$127,500
2012	Pagan Priestess	4	Mike Luzzi	W. Robert Bailes	Bobby Sowder	1-1/8	1:49.40	$100,000
2011	Love's Blush	5	Jeremy Rose	Rodney Jenkins	Richard L. Golden	1-1/8	1:55.03	$100,000
2010	My Sweet Nenana	4	Christopher Ho	Daniel T. O'Ryan	Daniel T. O'Ryan	1-1/8	1:54.67	$100,000
2009	Talkin About Love	4	Carlos H. Marquez	Kevin G. Sleeter	Kevin G. Sleeter	1-1/8	1:47.85	$150,000
2008	Miss Lombardi	6	Jeremy Rose	H. Graham Motion	Linda & Rob Newton	1-1/8	1:49.52	$200,000
2007	Maddy's Heart	3	Ramon Dominguez	Timothy A. Hills	Dennis J. Federico	1-1/8	1:47.26	$200,000
2006	Debbie Sue	5	Jeremy Rose	Hamilton A. Smith	Fred A. Green, Jr.	1-1/8	1:47.63	$150,000
2005	Surf Lite	4	Rodney Soodeen	Flint W. Stites	Country Life Farm	1-1/8	1:51.95	$150,000
2004	Hail Hillary	4	Mario Pino	David C. Kassen	Larry Slavin	1-1/8	1:51.09	$100,000
2003	Hail Hillary	3	Abe Castellano, Jr.	David C. Kassen	Larry Slavin	1-1/8	1:46.86	$100,000
2002	Shopping for Love	5	Richard Migliore	Kenneth A. Nesky	Dennis D'Arcangelo	1-1/8	1:48.61	$100,000
2001	Stal Quest	3	Travis Dunkelberger	Dale Capuano	Costas N. Triantafilos	1-1/8	1:48.40	$100,000
2000	Caveat's Shot	5	Mark T. Johnston	Dale Capuano	Ben Dover Stable	1-1/8	1:47.90	$100,000
1999	Vaguely Rich	4	Mario Pino	Robin L. Graham	Frank P. Wright	1-1/8	1:54.80	$100,000
1998	Lonesome Sound	6	Mario Verge	H. Graham Motion	Sandy Bayou Stables	1-1/8	1:52.20	$100,000
1997	Only Ali	5	Carlos H. Marquez Jr.	Barclay Tagg	Yardley Manfuso	1-1/8	1:59.20	$100,000
1996	Julie's Brilliance	4	Mark T. Johnston	King T. Leatherbury	Elaine L. Bassford	1-1/8	1:59.60	$100,000
1995	Mz. Zill Bear	6	Steve D. Hamilton	Ronald Cartwright	Mea Culpa Stables	1-1/8	1:51.80	$120,000
1994	Mz. Zill Bear	5	Larry C. Reynolds	Ronald Cartwright	Mea Culpa Stables	1-1/8	1:53.00	$120,000
1993	Mz. Zill Bear	4	Edgar S. Prado	Ronald Cartwright	Mea Culpa Stables	1-1/8	1:49.40	$120,000
1992	Richard's Lass	4	Jorge F. Chavez	Alfredo Callejas	Robert Perez	1-1/8	1:50.20	$120,000
1991	Countus In	6	Julie Krone	Steven M. Rieser	Charles G. Middleton III	1-1/8	1:50.20	$120,000
1990	Countus In	5	Julie Krone	Steven M. Rieser	Charles G. Middleton III	1-1/16	1:42.60	$150,000
1989	Countus In	4	Julie Krone	Steven M. Rieser	Charles G. Middleton III	1-1/16	1:42.20	$150,000
1988	Chapel of Dreams	4	Chris McCarron	John Parisella	Theodore M. Sabarese	1-1/16	1:49.00	$150,000
1987	Gold Glove	4	Laffit Pincay Jr.	J. William Boniface	Ivy Dell Stud	1-1/16	1:49.00	$150,000
1986	Dismasted	4	Jean-Luc Samyn	Philip G. Johnson	Edward P. Evans	1-1/16	1:44.60	$150,000

== See also ==
- Maryland Million Ladies top three finishers
- Maryland Million Day
- Laurel Park Racecourse
