= Maryland Million Nursery top three finishers =

This is a listing of the horses that finished in either first, second, or third place and the number of starters in the Maryland Million Nursery, an American state-bred stakes race for two-year-old colts at seven furlong on the dirt held at Laurel Park Racecourse in Laurel, Maryland. (List 1986-present)

Year	Winner	Second	Third	Starters
2020				-
2019	Ournationonparade	Stone Courageous	Laddie Liam	11
2018	Follow the Dog	Sky Magician	Outofthepark	9
2017	Clever Mind	Jamaican Don	Onemoregreattime	9
2016	Greatbullsoffire	Dancing With Maude	Maryland's Best	12
2015	Corvus	Flash McCaul	Captain Alex	10
2014	Golden Years	Legal Punch	Stonebriar	8
2013	It's a Bang	Joint Custody	Fran's Buckaroo	7
2012	Keep Momma Happy	Alpha Mike Foxtrot	Lunar Rock	14
2011	Glib	Coach Fridge	Won the War	13
2010	Steady Warrior	Skip The Trial	Lovetofinishfirst	11
2009	Lil Kiara	Ben's Boots	Jim's Prospect	n/a
2008	Juke Joint	Cool Punch	Mr. Keeper	n/a
2007	Regal Solo	Smooth It Over	Izzy Speaking	n/a
2006	Clifton Park	Crypto Prime	Man in Grey	n/a
2005	Creve Coeur	X Marks the Spot	Preferred Leader	n/a
2004	What's Up Lonely	Monster Chaser	Late Night Lover	n/a
2003	Polish Rifle	Musical Vision	Wanaka	n/a
2002	Cherokee's Boy	Ironton	Bridge Out Again	n/a
2001	Pal's Partner	Private Opening	Square Cut Diamond	n/a
2000	T. P. Louie	Charlie's Cards	Zloty	n/a
1999	Darwin	Trams	Crafty Celt	n/a
1998	Pulling Punches	Red Star Rose	Pettit's Quest	n/a
1997	Carnivorous Habit	Swingin Verse	Malaka Head	n/a
1996	Carrolls Favorite	King Buck	Lay Low Halo	n/a
1995	Count On Numbers	Hardball	Way Out Front	n/a
1994	Sam's Quest	American Wolf	Speedquestor	n/a
1993	Run Alden	Canton River	Forum Club	n/a
1992	Military Look	Guru Dude	P. J. Higgins	n/a
1991	Coolin It	Ace Eyes	North Carroll	n/a
1990	Xray	Conga Tempo	Romeo My Romeo	n/a
1989	Real Tough	Fighting Brass	Wooden Injun	n/a
1988	Snow King	Assault Party	Twilight Roll	n/a
1987	Sean's Ferrari	King's Snow	Gospel Note	n/a
1986	First Patriot	Sudden Flare	Yet Wave	n/a

== See also ==
- Maryland Million Nursery
- Maryland Million Day
- Laurel Park Racecourse
