= 2002 Kentucky Derby =

Horse race

128th Kentucky Derby
- Kentucky Derby
- Location: Churchill Downs
- Date: May 4, 2002
- Winning horse: War Emblem
- Winning time: 2:01.13
- Starting price: 20-1
- Jockey: Derek Matthew Otterson
- Trainer: Bob Baffert
- Owner: The Thoroughbred Corporation
- Conditions: Fast
- Surface: Dirt
- Attendance: 145,033

The 2002 Kentucky Derby was the 128th running of the Kentucky Derby. The race took place on May 4, 2002, and 145,033 people were in attendance. The race was won by War Emblem who led from start to finish.

== Race description ==
The field was considered evenly matched, especially after the scratch of Buddha, who had won the Wood Memorial. The favorite was Harlan's Holiday, who had won both the Florida Derby and Blue Grass Stakes. He went off at odds of 6–1, then the longest starting price for a favorite in Derby history. Medaglia d'Oro and Saarland, who had finished second and fourth in the Wood Memorial respectively, went off at odds of 7–1.

War Emblem was a relative longshot at odds of 20–1, despite having won the Illinois Derby in frontrunning fashion on April 6. Shortly after that race, he was purchased by The Thoroughbred Corporation (owned by Saudi Prince Ahmed Salman) and was put into training with Bob Baffert. Baffert trained the colt aggressively to build up his stamina, and quipped, "If this horse wins the Derby, it will be the best and shortest training job ever."

As expected, War Emblem went to the early lead, running the first quarter-mile in 23.25 seconds and the half in :47.04. Jockey Victor Espinoza was then able to slow down the pace slightly as the colt maintained a lead of 1 1/2 lengths down the backstretch and around the final turn. In the final furlong, War Emblem opened up his lead to four lengths under a hand ride. Espinoza said that he knew no one could catch them as the colt had been moving so easily. He completed the 1 1/4 miles in 2:01.13, then the seventh fastest Derby in history. Another longshot, Proud Citizen, finished second, resulting in an exacta payout of $1,300.80 for a $2 bet.

== Results ==
Finished	Program number	Horse	Jockey	Trainer	Owner	Odds	Time / behind
1st	5	War Emblem	Victor Espinoza	Bob Baffert	The Thoroughbred Corporation	20.50	2:01.13
2nd	13	Proud Citizen	Mike E. Smith	D. Wayne Lukas	R. Baker, D. Cornstein, Wm. Mack	23.30	4 lengths
3rd	3	Perfect Drift	Eddie Delahoussaye	Murray W. Johnson	Stonecrest Farm	7.90	4 3/4 lengths
4th	9	Medaglia d'Oro	Laffit Pincay Jr.	Robert Frankel	Edmund A. Gann	6.90	8 lengths
5th	7	Request for Parole	Robby Albarado	Steve Margolis	Jeri & Sam Knighton	29.80	9 1/2 lengths
6th	15	Came Home	Chris McCarron	Paco Gonzales	Farish, Goodman, Toffan & McCaffrey	8.20	10 1/4 lengths
7th	14	Harlan's Holiday	Edgar Prado	Ken McPeek	Starlight Stable, L.P.	6.00	12 1/4 lengths
8th	1	Johannesburg	Gary Stevens	Aidan O'Brien	Michael Tabor & Susan Magnier	8.10	13 lengths
9th	8	Essence of Dubai	David Flores	Saeed bin Suroor	Godolphin Racing, Inc.	10.00	13 lengths
10th	16	Saarland	John Velazquez	Claude R. McGaughey III	Cynthia Phipps	6.90	14 lengths
11th	20	Blue Burner	Pat Day	Bill Mott	Kinsman Stable	24.20	16 1/2 lengths
12th	11	Castle Gandolfo	Jerry Bailey	Aidan O'Brien	Susan Magnier	14.50	17 lengths
13th	19	Easy Grades	Jorge Chavez	Ted West	Desperado Stables	43.80	21 1/4 lengths
14th	10	Private Emblem	Donnie Meche	Steve Asmussen	James Cassels & Bob Zollars	22.40	21 1/2 lengths
15th	4	Lusty Latin	Glenn Corbett	Jeff Mullins	Joey & Wendy Platts	22.10	26 lengths
16th	16	It'sallinthechase	Eddie Martin Jr.	Wilson Brown	Darwin Olson	94.50	28 1/4 lengths
17th	6	Ocean Sound	Alex Solis	James M. Cassidy	K.M. Stable, Jim Ford, & D. Pearson	48.70	31 lengths
18th	2	Wild Horses	René Douglas	Todd Pletcher	Peachtree Stable	58.50	33 1/4 lengths

Scratched: Buddha, Danthebluegrassman

Source: Equibase Chart

== Payout ==
The 128th Kentucky Derby Payout Schedule

Program Number	Horse Name	Win	Place	Show
5	War Emblem	US$43.00	$22.80	$13.60
13	Proud Citizen	-	$24.60	$13.40
3	Perfect Drift	-	-	$6.40

- $2 Exacta: (5-13) Paid $1,300.80
- $2 Trifecta: (5-13-3) Paid $18,373.20
- $1 Superfecta: (5-13-3-9) Paid $91,764.50

== Subsequent racing careers ==
Several horses went on to record Grade I wins:

- War Emblem – Preakness Stakes, Haskell Invitational
- Perfect Drift – 2003 Stephen Foster Handicap
- Medaglia d'Oro – Travers Stakes, 2003 Whitney Handicap, 2004 Donn Handicap
- Request for Parole – 2004 United Nations Stakes
- Came Home – Pacific Classic
- Harlan's Holiday – 2003 Donn Handicap

== Subsequent breeding careers ==
Medaglia d'Oro

- Rachel Alexandra – 2009 Horse of the Year. Preakness Stakes, Kentucky Oaks, Haskell Invitational, Woodward Stakes
- Songbird – 2015 Breeders' Cup Juvenile Fillies, 2016 Kentucky Oaks, Santa Anita Oaks, Coaching Club American Oaks
- Plum Pretty – 2011 Kentucky Oaks, Cotillion, 2012 Apple Blossom
- Vancouver – 2015 Golden Slipper
- Talismanic - 2016 Breeders' Cup Turf

Harlan's Holiday

- Shanghai Bobby – Breeders' Cup Juvenile, Hopeful Stakes, Champagne Stakes
- Into Mischief – CashCall Futurity

Johannesburg

- Scat Daddy – Champagne Stakes, Florida Derby
- Strapping Groom – Forego Stakes

Essence of Dubai

- Dubai Majesty – Breeders' Cup Filly & Mare Sprint

Sources: American Classic Pedigrees, Equibase, Blood-Horse Stallion Register, Racing Post
