= Perfect Drift =

American-bred Thoroughbred racehorse

- Perfect Drift at the 2006 Pacific Classic
- Sire: Dynaformer
- Grandsire: Roberto
- Dam: Nice Gal
- Damsire: Naskra
- Sex: Gelding
- Foaled: 1999
- Died: January 4, 2024
- Country: USA
- Colour: Bay
- Breeder: Dr. William A. Reed
- Owner: Stonecrest Farm, Dr. Reed
- Trainer: Murray Johnson (until the fall of 2007); Richard Mandella (beginning in the fall of 2007)
- Record: 50: 11-14-7
- Earnings: $4,714,213

Major wins
- Spiral Stakes (2002); Indiana Derby (2002); Turfway Prevue (2002); Stephen Foster Handicap (2003); Washington Park Handicap (2003, 2005); Kentucky Cup Classic Handicap (2003); Hawthorne Gold Cup Handicap (2003)
- Last updated on May 11, 2007

Perfect Drift (April 29, 1999 – January 4, 2024) was an American thoroughbred racehorse who won or placed in 21 stakes races in his career. He won the Grade 1 Stephen Foster Handicap in 2003, as well as the Washington Park Handicap in 2003 and 2005.

== Background ==
Foaled in Kentucky, Perfect Drift was a bay gelding sired by the leading stallion Dynaformer, out of the Naskra mare Nice Gal. Perfect Drift was owned by Stonecrest Farm and bred by Stonecrest owner and heart surgeon Dr. William A. Reed. He was trained by Murray Johnson at Trackside Stable in Louisville, Kentucky.

Perfect Drift started 50 times, winning 11, placing in 13, coming third in 6, and finishing in the money in approximately 75 percent of those starts.

Perfect Drift won on both dirt and turf, at distances ranging from 6½ furlongs to 1 and a quarter miles. He raced on at least 12 tracks and recorded Beyer Speed Figures of 100 or more on many occasions.

== Racing career ==
In 2002, he won the Grade II Spiral Stakes, the Grade III Indiana Derby (which became a Grade II event by 2006) and the Turfway Prevue Stakes, and came home second in the WEBN Frog Stakes, the John Battaglia Memorial Stakes. He ran third in the Kentucky Derby, where he checked by War Emblem and forced to alter course to the outside, alloweing Proud Citizen to take second.

In 2003, with War Emblem retired for lucrative stallion duties in Japan, Perfect Drift won the Grade I Stephen Foster Handicap, the Grade II Washington Park Handicap, the Grade II Kentucky Cup Classic Handicap and the Grade II Hawthorne Gold Cup Handicap.

In 2004, he placed in the Grade I Whitney Handicap, the Pacific Classic Stakes, the Hawthorne Gold Cup, the Grade III Cornhusker Breeders' Cup Handicap and the Grade III Alysheba Stakes, and was third in the Clark Handicap and his second Stephen Foster.

In 2005, he took the Washington Park Handicap for the second time (setting a new record), and was again second in the Grade I Pacific Classic Stakes, the Stephen Foster, the Grade I Breeders' Cup Classic, and the Clark Handicap.

In 2006, he placed in his fourth Stephen Foster, third Washington Park Handicap and second Kentucky Cup Classic. That year, Perfect Drift earned $370,293.

He has run in five straight Breeders' Cup Classics, finishing fourth in 2004, third in 2005 and was unplaced in 2006. On November 7, 2006, Johnson announced that he believed a breathing problem hindered Perfect Drift's run in the Classic. A post-race examination showed he suffered from chondritis, which limits air intake. Due to these concerns, Perfect Drift did not compete in the 2006 Clark Handicap.

Perfect Drift has been ridden by several different jockeys, including Hall of Famers Eddie Delahoussaye, Pat Day and Gary Stevens, all now retired. Day guided Perfect Drift to four graded victories in 2003: the Stephen Foster Handicap, the Washington Park Handicap, the Kentucky Cup Classic, and the Hawthorne Gold Cup. In 2007, he was ridden by Jon Court for the $250,000 Grade II Californian Stakes at Hollywood Park.

Perfect Drift ran in 19 Grade I races. In 2006, he took another shot at the Breeder's Cup Classic under leading jockey Garrett Gomez, who rode two Breeders' Cup World Championship winners in 2005. Perfect Drift tied Sprint winner Kona Gold as the only horse to make five starts in a Breeders' Cup event, and was the first horse to start that many times in the Classic.

In July 2007, it was reported that Perfect Drift had a small fracture in his cannon bone which was possibly career-threatening, and that he would be turned out for several months before being re-evaluated. The injury was believed to have occurred on May 4 during the Alysheba Stakes at Churchill Downs, when Perfect Drift placed fourth behind Wanderin Boy. He underwent surgery to repair this injury in the fall of 2007, and was then placed in the care of trainer Richard Mandella. In late March 2008, it was announced that Perfect Drift was back in training.

== Retirement ==
In September 2008, Mandella announced Perfect Drift's retirement. Asked by Dr. Reed, "...if [Mandella] could bring Perfect Drift back off a layoff, I said sure. The only stipulation was that he wanted the horse to enjoy himself and stay sound and compete at a fairly high level. Anytime we thought it wasn't going in the right way we would stop with him. We had some good races with him, but he never reached the level I thought he should have been at. But he's in great shape; very healthy and very sound."

On September 27, 2008 (Kentucky Cup day), Perfect Drift was honored at Turfway Park.

He went home to live out his life at Stonecrest Farms in Kansas City, Missouri, but spent a summer at the Kentucky Derby Museum at Churchill Downs. Perfect Drift later came back to the track at Churchill Downs as a pony horse. He was California Chrome's pony in the 2014 Kentucky Derby as well as for Firing Line in the 2015 Kentucky Derby.

Perfect Drift won $4,714,213, making him the seventh richest gelding by lifetime earnings in North America, behind Wise Dan, John Henry, Game on Dude, Best Pal, Lava Man, and Well Armed.

== Death ==
On January 4, 2024, Dr. Reed announced that Perfect Drift had been euthanized, and had reoccurring complications from a paddock accident in 2020, which resulted in an injury to his hock.
