= Private Terms Stakes =

- Class: Ungraded Stakes
- Location: Laurel Park Racecourse, Laurel, Maryland, United States
- Inaugurated: 1990
- Race type: Thoroughbred - Flat racing
- Website: www.laurelpark.com

Race information
- Distance: 1 1/8 mile (9 furlongs)
- Surface: Dirt
- Track: left-handed
- Qualification: Three-years-old, open
- Weight: Assigned
- Purse: $150,000

The Private Terms Stakes is a race for Thoroughbred horses held in late March at Laurel Park in Maryland, USA. The ungraded stakes race is open to three-year-olds, is run over one mile and an eighth on the dirt, and offers a purse of $150,000. It is a minor race on the road to the Triple Crown each spring. The winner of the Private Terms Stakes typically races next in either the Federico Tesio Stakes (Preakness Trial) at Pimlico Race Course in Baltimore or the Wood Memorial Stakes at Aqueduct Racetrack in New York.

This race is named for Private Terms (born 1985), who won 13 of his 17 starts, including the Grade I Wood Memorial Stakes, the Grade II Gotham Stakes, the grade two Massachusetts Handicap, the grade two General George Handicap and the grade three Federico Tesio Stakes. He had career earnings of $1,243,947 and nine stakes victories. In his retirement, Private Terms has had great success, siring millionaires stakes winners Soul of the Matter and Afternoon Deelites. He has an outstanding success rate as a sire, having 73% of his progeny win races and 11% of his progeny becoming graded stakes winners.

== Records ==
Speed record:

- 1 mile - 1:37.18 - Plantation (2010)
- 1 1/16 miles - 1:43 4/5 - Haymaker (1991)
- 1 1/8 miles - 1:49.00 - Dr. Best (1997)

Most wins by an owner:

- 2- Robert Meyerhoff (DBA Fitzugh LLC in '07) (1994 &2007)

Most wins by a jockey:

- 2 - Ramon Dominguez (2001 & 2004)
- 2 - Steve Hamilton (1997 & 2005)

Most wins by a trainer:

- 2 - King T. Leatherbury (1992 & 2005)
- 2 - Richard W. Small (1994 & 2007)

== Winners of the Private Terms Stakes ==
Year	Winner	Age	Jockey	Trainer	Owner	Distance (Miles)	Time	Purse
2022	Shake Em Loose	3	Charlie Marquez	Rodolfo Sanchez-Salomon	J R Sanchez Racing Stable	1 1/16	1:46.80	$100,000
2021	Shackled Love	3	Charlie Marquez	Gary Capuano	ZWP Stable/Non Stop Stab	1 1/16	1:43.56	$100,000
2020	Lebda	3	Alex Cintron	Claudio Gonzalez	Joseph Besecker	1 1/16	1:44.87	$100,000
2019	Alwaysmining	3	Daniel Centeno	Kelly Rubley	Runnymede Racing	1 1/16	1:42.65	$100,000
2018	V. I. P. Code	3	Carlos Quinones	Phil Schoenthal	Everest Stables, Inc.	1 1/16	1:44.62	$100,000
2017	Twisted Tom	3	Feargal Lynch	Chad Brown	Cobra Farm Inc	1 1/16	1:45.68	$100,000
2016	Abiding Star	3	Jevian Toledo	Edward T. Allard	Stonehedge LLC	1 1/16	1:46.61	$100,000
2015	Bridget's Big Luvy	3	Angel Cruz	Jeremiah Englehart	Tom O'Grady	1 1/8	1:51.92	$100,000
2014	Kid Cruz	3	Julian Pimentel	Linda Rice	Vina Del Mar T-breds	1 1/8	1:54.82	$100,000
2013	Mr. Palmer	3	Junior Alvarado	Bill Mott	M.Lauffer & G.McDonald	1 1/8	1:51.35	$150,000
2012	Raconteur	3	Chris DeCarlo	Todd Pletcher	Dogwood Stable	1-mile	1:37.69	$100,000
2011	Bandbox	3	Travis Dunkelberger	Rodney Jenkins	Hillwood Stable LLC	1-mile	1:37.25	$75,000
2010	Plantation	3	Travis Dunkelberger	Rodney Jenkins	Nellie Mae Cox	1-mile	1:37.18	$70,000
2009	St. John's Gospel	3	Hector Ramos	Andrea Gonzalez	Lee R. Christian	1-mile	1:37.62	$85,000
2008	Double or Nothing	3	Abel Castellano	Richard E. Dutrow, Jr.	Goldfarb, Dubb, et al.	1-mile	1:38.66	$85,000
2007	Etude	3	Luis Garcia	Richard W. Small	Fitzhugh, LLC	1-mile	1:37.97	$100,000
2006	Our Peak	3	Rosie Napravnik	Katharine M. Voss	Twin Oak Stable	1-mile	1:38.66	$85,000
2005	Malibu Moonshine	3	Steve Hamilton	King T. Leatherbury	King T. Leatherbury	1-mile	1:40.04	$75,000
2004	Water Cannon	3	Ramon Dominguez	Linda L. Albert	Nonsequitur Stable	1 1/16	1:45.40	$100,000
2003	Sky Soldier	3	Rodrigo Madrigal, Jr.	Todd Beattie	Arthur Vickers	1 1/16	1:45.37	$75,000
2002	Magic Weisner	3	Phil Teator	Nancy H. Alberts	Nancy H. Alberts	1 1/8	1:51.15	$75,000
2001	Bay Eagle	3	Ramon Dominguez	H. Graham Motion	Lazy Lane Farms	1 1/8	1:50.51	$75,000
2000	Pickupspeed	3	Ryan Fogelsonger	Lawrence E. Murray	Sondra D. Bender	1 1/8	1:50.51	$75,000
1999	Harry's Halo	3	Mario Verge	Grover G. Delp	Hurstland Farm	1 1/8	1:50.40	$50,000
1998	Eisai Haramasukoi	3	Nik Goodwin	Robert L. Beall	William P. Hill	1 1/8	1:52.00	$50,000
1997	Dr. Best	3	Steve Hamilton	Charles J. Hadry	Kinsman Stables	1 1/8	1:49.00	$50,000
1996	Mixed Count	3	Edgar Prado	Ronald L. Bensoff	Ronald L. Bensoff	1 1/8	1:51.00	$50,000
1995	Flying Punch	3	Omar Klinger	Donald H. Barr	Milton Higgins III	1 1/16	1:44.20	$50,000
1994	Looming	3	Andrea Seefeldt	Richard W. Small	Robert Meyerhoff	1 1/16	1:44.20	$50,000
1993	Chip's Dancer	3	Clarence Ladner	Jerald M. Ferris	Chip Reed	1 1/16	1:44.40	$50,000
1992	Ameri Valay	3	Mike Luzzi	King T. Leatherbury	Country Life Farm	1 1/16	1:45.00	$50,000
1991	Haymaker	3	Marco Castaneda	Carlos A. Garcia	Rick Kastor	1 1/16	1:43.80	$50,000
1990	Baron de Vaux	3	Alberto Delgado	Charles Peoples	Dormello Stud	1 1/16	1:46.00	$50,000

== See also ==
- Private Terms Stakes "top three finishers" and starters
- Laurel Park Racecourse
