= Sarava =

American-bred Thoroughbred racehorse (1999–2023)

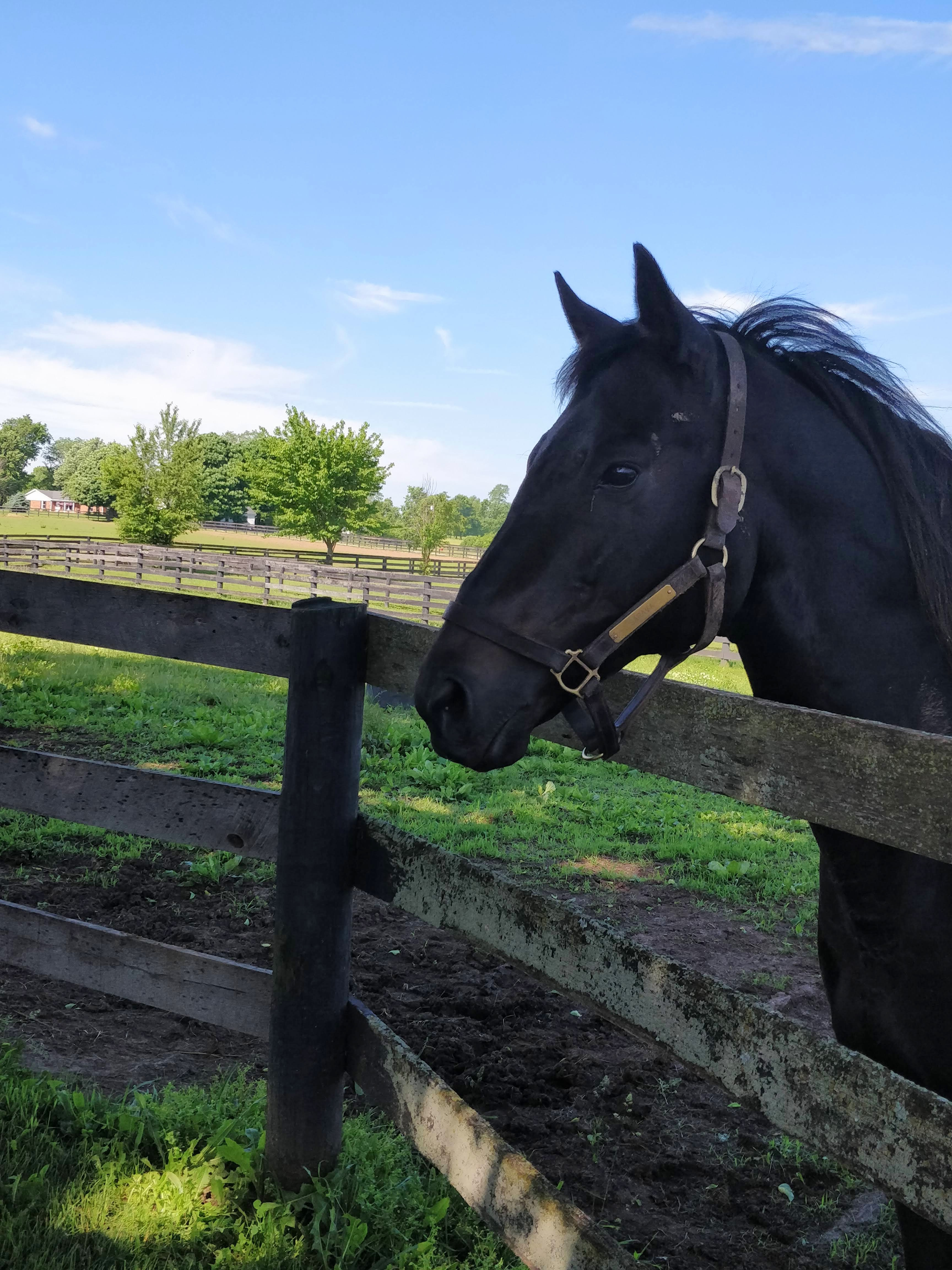
- Sarava in 2018
- Sire: Wild Again
- Grandsire: Icecapade
- Dam: Rhythm of Life
- Damsire: Deputy Minister
- Sex: Stallion
- Foaled: March 2, 1999
- Died: August 28, 2023 (aged 24); Georgetown, Kentucky
- Country: United States
- Colour: DarkBay
- Breeder: Timber Bay Farm (Bill Entenmann)
- Owner: New Phoenix Stable (Gary Drake, lead partner)
- Trainer: Kenneth McPeek
- Record: 17: 3-3-0
- Earnings: $773,832

Major wins
- Sir Barton Stakes (2002); Triple Crown race wins: Belmont Stakes (2002)
- Last updated on August 29, 2023

Sarava (March 2, 1999 – August 28, 2023) was an American Thoroughbred racehorse, best known for winning the 2002 Belmont Stakes.

== Background ==
Sired by the 1984 Breeders' Cup Classic winner Wild Again, Sarava was out of the mare Rhythm of Life, a daughter of Canadian Horse Racing Hall of Fame inductee and two-time Leading sire in North America, Deputy Minister.

== Racing career ==
Sarava was purchased for $250,000 at the Fasig-Tipton sale. Sent to race in England, he failed to win in three starts as a 2-year-old. Returned to the United States in the fall, under trainer Burk Kessinger, the colt won his American debut at Churchill Downs on November 21, 2001.

Given over to Kenneth McPeek for conditioning early in his three-year-old season, after a modest 2002 spring campaign he won the Sir Barton Stakes at Pimlico Race Course by four lengths under jockey Edgar Prado. Sarava and Prado then won the Belmont Stakes at record odds of 70-1, ending the bid by Kentucky Derby and Preakness Stakes winner War Emblem to capture the U.S. Triple Crown. The race was witnessed by 103,222 people, the largest crowd in Belmont Park history.

== Stud record ==
In 2005 Sarava began stud duty at Cloverleaf Farms II in Reddick, Florida. Mated to the mare Watch Closely, whose grandsire was Mr. Prospector, his first foal, Avaras, was born in 2007.

== Retirement and death ==
On September 29, 2012, 13-year-old Sarava arrived at Old Friends Equine, a non-profit Thoroughbred retirement facility in Georgetown, Kentucky.

Sarava was euthanized at Old Friends on August 28, 2023, due to complications from a fractured leg. He was 24.

== Pedigree ==
Pedigree of Sarava, dark bay colt, 1999
Sire Wild Again	Icecapade	Nearctic	Nearco
Sire Wild Again	Icecapade	Nearctic	Lady Angela
Sire Wild Again	Icecapade	Shenanigans	Native Dancer
Sire Wild Again	Icecapade	Shenanigans	Bold Irish
Sire Wild Again	Bushel-n-Peck	Khaled	Hyperion
Sire Wild Again	Bushel-n-Peck	Khaled	Eclair
Sire Wild Again	Bushel-n-Peck	Dama	Dante
Sire Wild Again	Bushel-n-Peck	Dama	Clovelly
Dam Rhythm of Life	Deputy Minister	Vice Regent	Northern Dancer
Dam Rhythm of Life	Deputy Minister	Vice Regent	Victoria Regina
Dam Rhythm of Life	Deputy Minister	Mint Copy	Bunty’s Flight
Dam Rhythm of Life	Deputy Minister	Mint Copy	Shakney
Dam Rhythm of Life	Nalee's Rhythm	Nalees Man	Gallant Man
Dam Rhythm of Life	Nalee's Rhythm	Nalees Man	Nalee
Dam Rhythm of Life	Nalee's Rhythm	Lady Rhythm	Mister Jive
Dam Rhythm of Life	Nalee's Rhythm	Lady Rhythm	Miss Kansulin (family: 10-c)
