= War Emblem =

American-bred Thoroughbred racehorse

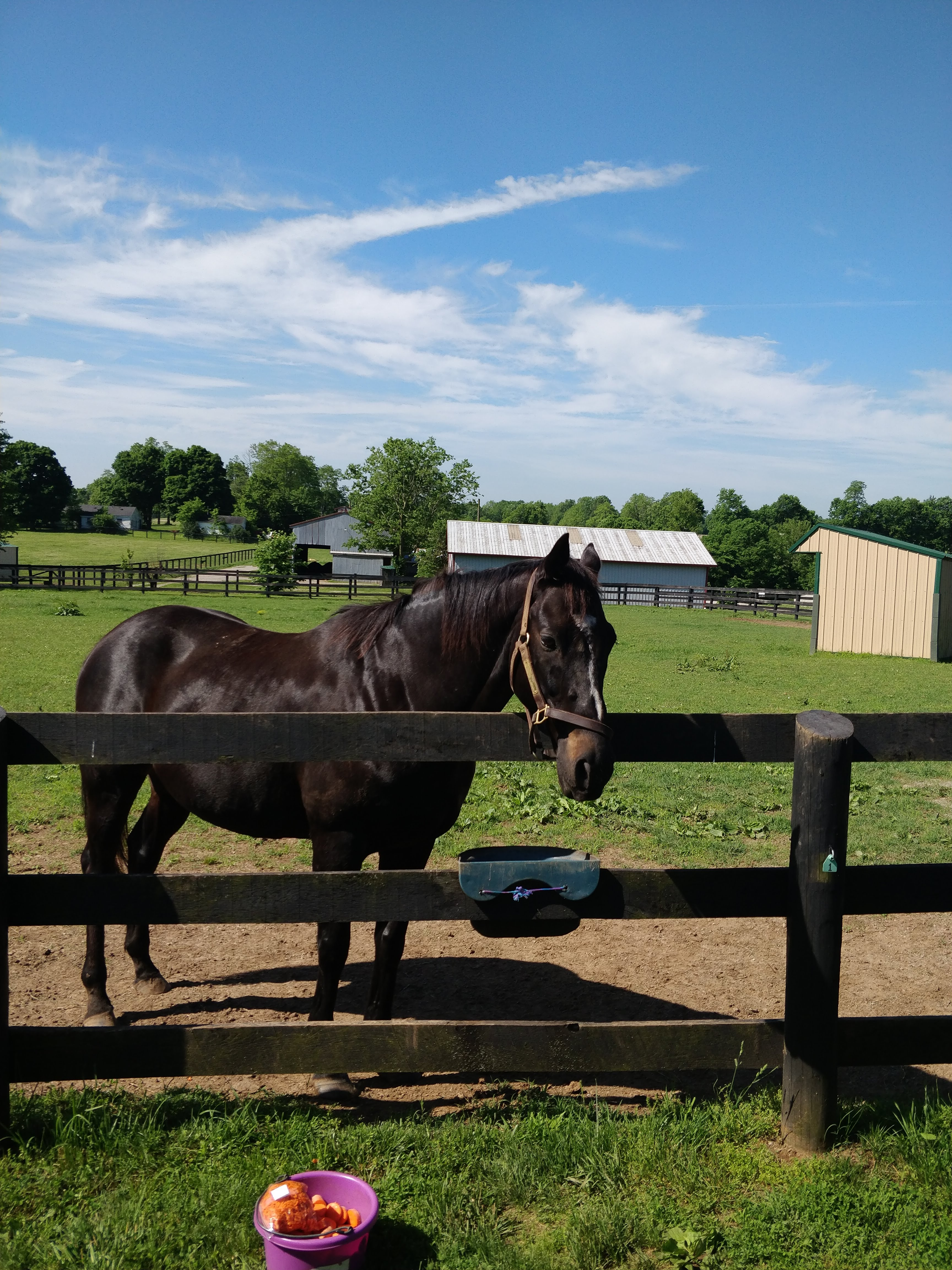
- War Emblem at Old Friends
- Sire: Our Emblem
- Grandsire: Mr. Prospector
- Dam: Sweetest Lady
- Damsire: Lord at War
- Sex: Stallion until gelded at age 17
- Foaled: February 20, 1999
- Died: March 11, 2020 (aged 21); Georgetown, Kentucky, U.S.
- Country: United States
- Color: Dark bay or brown
- Breeder: Charles Nuckols Jr. & Sons
- Owner: Russell L. Reineman; The Thoroughbred Corp.
- Trainer: Frank R. Springer; Bob Baffert
- Record: 13: 7-0-0
- Earnings: $3,491,000

Major wins
- Illinois Derby (2002); Haskell Invitational Handicap (2002); Triple Crown wins: Kentucky Derby (2002); Preakness Stakes (2002)

Awards
- American Champion 3-Yr-Old Male Horse (2002)

War Emblem (February 20, 1999 – March 11, 2020) was a champion American Thoroughbred racehorse who won the 2002 Kentucky Derby and Preakness Stakes and was later exported to Japan as a breeding stallion.

== Background ==
War Emblem was bred by Charles Nuckols Jr. & Sons in Kentucky. His sire was Our Emblem, a stakes placed son of leading sire Mr. Prospector and the undefeated mare Personal Ensign. War Emblem's dam was Sweetest Lady by Lord At War. Often described as nearly black, he was registered as dark bay or brown colt with a white star. In the 2000 Keeneland September Yearling Sale, he failed to meet his reserve of $20,000 so raced under the colors of Russell Reineman, who had owned the colt's dam. Initially, he was trained by Frank Springer.

Described as narcissistic, War Emblem was a temperamental horse who did not like people or other horses: Bob Baffert nicknamed the colt 'Hannibal Lecter' for his habit of biting. He had a history of bone chips in his knees and ankles, which discouraged several potential buyers. He liked to race at the front of the field, but sometimes compromised his own chances by acting up in the starting gate.

== Racing career ==
As a two-year-old, War Emblem won his first start, but then finished seventh when entered in the Manila Stakes. He rebounded with a win in an allowance race to finish 2001 with a record of two wins from three starts.

His three-year-old campaign started poorly, with a fifth place in the Lecomte Stakes and a sixth-place finish in the Risen Star, both at Fair Grounds Race Course. He returned to form with a 10 3/4 length win in an allowance race at Sportsman's Park Racetrack, then won the Illinois Derby by 6 1/4 lengths in wire-to-wire fashion. Prince Ahmed bin Salman of Saudi Arabia bought a ninety percent interest in War Emblem for a reported $1 million just three weeks before the Kentucky Derby.

Victor Espinoza was his jockey for the 2002 Kentucky Derby, never having seen the horse until the morning of the race. War Emblem, who went off at 21-to-1 odds, took the early lead and sent sensible early fractions, then kicked away from the field in the stretch. He won the race in a fast time of 2:01.13. It was the first Kentucky Derby win for new owner Salman and the third for new trainer Bob Baffert. War Emblem beat the likes of Medaglia d'Oro (winner of the Travers Stakes, Jim Dandy Stakes, and Whitney Handicap, among others); Perfect Drift (winner of the Stephen Foster, the Indiana Derby, and the Washington Park Handicap twice, among others); and Harlan's Holiday (winner of the Florida Derby, the Pennsylvania Derby, and the Donn Handicap among others).

In the 2002 Preakness Stakes, War Emblem rated just behind the leaders who set a fast pace, went to the lead on the far turn and held off a late rally by Magic Weisner. With a Triple Crown at stake, the Belmont Stakes on June 8 attracted the biggest crowd in the track's history with 103,222 spectators. War Emblem stumbled and nearly fell to his knees coming out of the gate, then bumped into another horse, losing several lengths in the process. He then struggled with Espinoza who tried to rate the colt down the backstretch. War Emblem surged to the lead in the final turn before fading at the top of the stretch: The winner was 70-1 long-shot Sarava. It was the third time Baffert had lost the Belmont with a Triple Crown at stake: He had previously lost with Silver Charm in 1997 and Real Quiet in 1998. Baffert later said, "He was so one-dimensional and such an irritable horse as it was, as soon as he was behind horses, I had to sit there for 2½ minutes waiting for the race to be over."

War Emblem returned to the track on August 4 as the favorite in the Haskell Invitational Handicap and won easily by 3 1/2 lengths. Baffert said, "You forget how good this horse is. From now on we're just going to let him run the way he wants. If he were one of those wild horses in the herd, he'd be the top dog. Like 'The Black Stallion', you don't want to break that spirit." He became the first horse to win the Kentucky Derby and Haskell.

War Emblem then traveled to California for the Pacific Classic on August 25 at Del Mar against older horses. He broke poorly but quickly settled into second place and seemed to be running well. However, he tired coming into the stretch and finished sixth. In his final start at Arlington Park on October 26, he finished eighth in the Breeders' Cup Classic. War Emblem finished his career with seven wins from 13 starts and earnings of $3,491,000. In his six losses, he finished no better than fifth. He received the Eclipse Award for champion three-year-old colt of 2002 and was a distant runner-up to Azeri in the Horse of the Year voting.

== Career as a sire ==
In September 2002, War Emblem was sold to the prominent Yoshida racing family of Japan for US$17.7 million to stand at stud at their renowned Shadai Stallion Station in Shiraoi, Hokkaido.

Expected to follow in the footsteps of Shadai's great sires Northern Taste and Sunday Silence, War Emblem did not fulfill those expectations in the breeding shed. "We know he is fertile, but he has no interest in mares", said Dr. Nubuo Tsunoda, the farm's director. For his first year at stud in 2003, only four foals were produced in 2004. His second year was more successful, resulting in nineteen colts and fifteen fillies born in 2005. However, his third crop born in 2006 consisted of only four colts and one filly. In the next two years, War Emblem rejected nearly every mare presented to him so no foals were produced in 2007 and 2008. On June 8, 2008, War Emblem was evaluated by a stallion behavior team from the University of Pennsylvania. They suggested that he should be separated from other stallions to help improve his breeding behavior. The measures seemed to help War Emblem in the 2009 breeding season, with a career record of 43 foals born in 2010. However, War Emblem reverted to his old habits in 2010, only covering five of 300 mares presented to him in the season. In 2012, he covered only three mares, none of whom became pregnant. In total, he sired only 106 registered foals between 2004 and 2011.

Although War Emblem only sired a total of 119 foals, his progeny proved quite successful on a percentage basis, with 80 winners from 111 starters and combined progeny earnings of $35,300,307. His last foal was born in 2012. He was represented by his first career stakes winner in 2008 when Shonan Alba (Xianlang (IRE), by Great Commotion) won the Kyodo News Service Hai, an 1,800 meter listed race on Tokyo Race Course's turf course. Nearly a month later, the filly Air Pascale (Raffica, by Sunday Silence) scored in the listed Tulip Sho at Hashin Race Course. On March 22, another filly, Black Emblem (Vin de Noir, by Hector Protector), became War Emblem's first classic winner with an odds-on victory in the Shuka Sho, the final leg of the Japanese Fillies' Triple Crown. Black Emblem later became dam of two stakes winners, Bright Emblem and Testament. War Emblem's most successful offspring was Robe Tissage, who was the champion two-year-old filly in Japan in 2012. He also sired Group 3 winners King's Emblem and War Tactics, and stakes winners Civil War, Danon Programmer, and Clan Emblem.

His son, Civil War, was sent to stud. Due to initial fears he would exhibit his sire's habits in the breeding shed, a special "conception confirmation"-clause was issued. At first year, Civil War covered 62 mares.

== Retirement and death ==
War Emblem's grave at Old Friends Equine.

In Fall of 2015, War Emblem was pensioned from stallion duty and repatriated to the United States, where he was sent to live at Old Friends Equine Retirement in Georgetown, Kentucky. Although he was not going to be used at stud, USDA regulations required that all stallions imported to the U.S. be tested for contagious equine metritis via test-breeding two mares. After a month in quarantine at the Rood & Riddle Equine Hospital, War Emblem declined breeding with any mares presented to him, and in order to keep him in the United States, the only remaining option was to geld him. The operation was a success with a full recovery by War Emblem at the age of 17 in 2016. War Emblem was found dead in his paddock at Old Friends Equine on March 11, 2020, at the age of 21. The cause of death was later found to be a ruptured small intestine.

== Race Record ==
Date	Age	Distance	Race	Grade	Track	Odds	Field	Finish	Winning Time	Winning (Losing) Margin	Jockey	Ref
Oct 4, 2001	2	1 mile	Maiden Special Weight	Maiden	Arlington	16.40	9	1	1:39.29	1 3/4 lengths	Alfredo Juarez, Jr.	
Oct 20, 2001	2	1 mile	Manila Stakes	Listed	Arlington	8.00	12	7	1:39.61	(17 1/2 lengths)	Alfredo Juarez, Jr.	
Nov 23, 2001	2	1 mile	Allowance	Allowance	Fair Grounds	2.00	6	1	1:39.15	4 1/2 lengths	Jamie Theriot	
Jan 26, 2002	3	1 Mile	LeComte Stakes	Listed	Fair Grounds	12.40	11	5	1:37.98	(2 1/4 lengths)	Jamie Theriot	
Feb 17, 2002	3	1 1/16 miles	Risen Star Stakes	III	Fair Grounds	38.80	9	6	1:43.17	(9 3/4 lengths)	Jamie Theriot	
Mar 17, 2002	3	1 mile	Allowance	Allowance	Sportsman's Park	*0.80	6	1	1:39.22	10 3/4 lengths	Alfredo Juarez, Jr.	
Apr 6, 2002	3	1 1/8 miles	Illinois Derby	II	Sportsman's Park	6.30	9	1	1:49.92	6 1/4 lengths	Larry Sterling, Jr.	
May 4, 2002	3	1 1/4 miles	Kentucky Derby	I	Churchill Downs	20.50	18	1	2:01.13	4 lengths	Victor Espinoza	
May 18, 2002	3	1 3/16 miles	Preakness Stakes	I	Pimlico	*2.80	13	1	1:56.36	3/4 length	Victor Espinoza	
Jun 8, 2002	3	1 1/2 miles	Belmont Stakes	I	Belmont Park	*1.25	11	8	2:29.71	(19 1/2 lengths)	Victor Espinoza	
Aug 4, 2002	3	1 1/8 miles	Haskell Invitational Handicap	I	Monmouth Park	*0.30	5	1	1:48.21	3 1/2 lengths	Victor Espinoza	
Aug 25, 2002	3	1 1/4 miles	Pacific Classic Stakes	I	Del Mar	*1.20	14	6	2:01.45	(4 1/4 lengths)	Victor Espinoza	
Oct 26, 2002	3	1 1/4 miles	Breeders' Cup Classic	I	Arlington	4.00	12	8	2:01.39	(18 1/4 lengths)	Victor Espinoza	

== Pedigree ==
Pedigree of War Emblem, dark bay or brown horse, 1999
Sire Our Emblem	Mr. Prospector	Raise A Native	Native Dancer
Sire Our Emblem	Mr. Prospector	Raise A Native	Raise You
Sire Our Emblem	Mr. Prospector	Gold Digger	Nashua
Sire Our Emblem	Mr. Prospector	Gold Digger	Sequence
Sire Our Emblem	Personal Ensign	Private Account	Damascus
Sire Our Emblem	Personal Ensign	Private Account	Numbered Account
Sire Our Emblem	Personal Ensign	Grecian Banner	Hoist The Flag
Sire Our Emblem	Personal Ensign	Grecian Banner	Dorine
Dam Sweetest Lady	Lord At War	General	Brigadier Gerard
Dam Sweetest Lady	Lord At War	General	Mercuriale
Dam Sweetest Lady	Lord At War	Luna De Miel	Con Brio
Dam Sweetest Lady	Lord At War	Luna De Miel	Good Will
Dam Sweetest Lady	Sweetest Roman	The Pruner	Herbager
Dam Sweetest Lady	Sweetest Roman	The Pruner	Punctilious
Dam Sweetest Lady	Sweetest Roman	I Also	Sky High
Dam Sweetest Lady	Sweetest Roman	I Also	Roman Song (family 20-b)
