= Breeders' Cup Filly & Mare Sprint top three finishers =

This is a listing of the horses that finished in either first, second, or third place and the number of starters in the Breeders' Cup Filly & Mare Sprint, a Grade One race run on dirt on Friday of the Breeders' Cup World Thoroughbred Championships.

Year	Winner	Second	Third	Starters
2026	Ways and Means	Foie Gras	Explora	11
2025	Splendora	Vahva	Hope Road	7
2024	Soul of an Angel	Society	Pleasant	9
2023	Goodnight Olive	Yuugiri	Three Witches	9
2022	Goodnight Olive	Echo Zulu	Wicked Halo	12
2021	Ce Ce	Edgeway	Gamine	5
2020	Gamine	Serengeti Empress	Bell's the One	8
2019	Covfefe	Bellafina	Dawn the Destroyer	9
2018	Shamrock Rose	Chalon	Anonymity	14
2017	Bar of Gold	Ami's Mesa	Carina Mia	14
2016	Finest City	Wavell Avenue	Paulassilverlining	13
2015	Wavell Avenue	La Verdad	Taris	14
2014	Judy the Beauty	Better Lucky	Thank You Marylou	10
2013	Groupie Doll	Judy the Beauty	Dance Card	10
2012	Groupie Doll	Dust and Diamonds	Switch	10
2011	Musical Romance	Switch	Her Smile	12
2010	Dubai Majesty	Switch	Evening Jewel	13
2009	Informed Decision	Ventura	Free Flying Soul	8
2008	Ventura	Indian Blessing	Zaftig	13
2007	Maryfield	Miraculous Miss	Miss Macy Sue	6

== See also ==
- Breeders' Cup World Thoroughbred Championships
