= Rancho Bernardo Handicap =

- Class: Grade III
- Location: Del Mar Racetrack; Del Mar, California
- Inaugurated: 1967
- Race type: Thoroughbred - Flat racing
- Website: Del Mar

Race information
- Distance: 6 1/2 furlongs
- Surface: Dirt
- Track: left-handed
- Qualification: Fillies & Mares, three-years-old and older
- Weight: Handicap
- Purse: $100,000 (2024)

The Rancho Bernardo Handicap is a Grade III American Thoroughbred horse race for fillies and mares age three and older run over a distance of six and one half furlongs on the dirt held annually in August at Del Mar Racetrack in Del Mar, California. The event currently carries a purse of $100,000.

== History ==
The event named after the master-planned community community Rancho Bernardo, San Diego located about 25 miles from Del Mar, was inaugurated on 14 October 1967 during the then Del Mar Fall meeting and held in split divisions for three-year-olds and older, and was run over a distance of one mile on the dirt track. The event was idle for five years and was resurrected in 1973 again in split divisions for three-year-olds and older, but this time on the grass track over 1 1/16 miles.

In 1974 the event was shortened to 6 furlongs and conditions were for fillies and mares three-years-old and older.

In 1986 the distance for the event was increased to 6 1/2 furlongs which is the current distance.

In 1988 the event was classified as a Grade III race.

In 1997 the John W. Sadler trained Track Gal won the event for the third time straight.

Between 1990 and 1995 the race had Breeders' Cup incentives which reflected in the name of the event. As of 2008, it is a Breeders' Cup "Win And You're In" event, qualifying the winner to run in the Breeders' Cup Filly & Mare Sprint.

The event has showcased some female sprinters that have gone on to capture Breeders' Cup events. Of these mares, the 1995 winner Desert Stormer went onto win the Breeders' Cup Sprint at Belmont Park defeating males. The 2014 winner Judy the Beauty went on to win the Breeders' Cup Filly & Mare Sprint and was crowned US Champion Female Sprint Horse that year.

== Records ==
Speed record:

- 6 1/2 furlongs: 1:14.20 - Track Gal (1995)
- 6 furlongs: 1:08.60 - Impressive Style (1974), Great Lady M. (1980), Lucky Lady Ellen (1982), Pleasure Cay (1984)

Margins:

- 7 lengths - Sweet Azteca (2024)

Most wins:

- 3 - Track Gal (1995, 1996, 1997)
- 3 - Sweet Azteca (2024, 2025, 2026)

Most wins by a jockey:

- 9 - Laffit Pincay, Jr. (1976, 1977, 1980, 1982, 1984, 1988, 1989, 1991, 2000)
- 8 - Chris McCarron (1978, 1983, 1986, 1987, 1995, 1996, 1997, 1998)

Most wins by a trainer:

- 7 - John W. Sadler (1995, 1996, 1997, 2008, 2018, 2021, 2022)

Most wins by an owner:

- 3 - William H. Oldknow & Robert W. Phipps (1995, 1996, 1997)
- 3 - Hronis Racing (2018, 2021, 2022)
- 3 - Pamela C. Ziebarth (2024, 2025, 2026)

== Winners ==
Year	Winner	Age	Jockey	Trainer	Owner	Distance	Time	Purse	Grade	Ref
2026	Sweet Azteca	6	Juan J. Hernandez	Richard Baltas	Pamela C. Ziebarth	6 1/2 furlongs	1:16.51	$100,000	III	
2025	Sweet Azteca	5	Juan J. Hernandez	Richard Baltas	Pamela C. Ziebarth	6 1/2 furlongs	1:15.44	$98,000	III	
2024	Sweet Azteca	4	Flavien Prat	Michael W. McCarthy	Pamela C. Ziebarth	6 1/2 furlongs	1:15.60	$100,500	III	
2023	Eda	4	Juan J. Hernandez	Bob Baffert	Baoma Corp	6 1/2 furlongs	1:16.49	$126,000	III	
2022	Edgeway	5	Juan J. Hernandez	John W. Sadler	Hronis Racing	6 1/2 furlongs	1:15.97	$150,000	III	
2021	Edgeway	4	Joe Bravo	John W. Sadler	Hronis Racing	6 1/2 furlongs	1:16.80	$98,000	III	
2020	Sneaking Out	4	Umberto Rispoli	Jerry Hollendorfer	KMN Racing	6 1/2 furlongs	1:15.57	$101,500	III	
2019	Danuska's My Girl	5	Geovanni Franco	Jerry Hollendorfer	Bad Boy Racing	6 1/2 furlongs	1:17.13	$101,404	III	
2018	Yuvetsi	4	Tyler Baze	John W. Sadler	Hronis Racing	6 1/2 furlongs	1:17.22	$98,000	III	
2017	Skye Diamonds	4	Tiago Josue Pereira	William Spawr	Allen Racing, Bloom Racing Stables, Tom Acker & John Lindo	6 1/2 furlongs	1:16.35	$100,000	III	
2016	Tara's Tango	4	Martin Garcia	Jerry Hollendorfer	Stonestreet Stables	6 1/2 furlongs	1:15.60	$100,345	III	
2015	Taris	4	Gary L. Stevens	Simon Callaghan	Mrs. John Magnier, Michael B. Tabor & Derrick Smith	6 1/2 furlongs	1:15.31	$100,500	III	
2014	Judy the Beauty	5	Mike E. Smith	Wesley A. Ward	Wesley A. Ward	6 1/2 furlongs	1:15.63	$147,000	III	
2013	Reneesgotzip	4	Garrett K. Gomez	Peter L. Miller	Lanni Family Trust	6 1/2 furlongs	1:14.48	$150,000	III	
2012	Winding Way	3	Rafael Bejarano	Carla Gaines	Spendthrift Farm	6 1/2 furlongs	1:15.93	$150,000	III	
2011	Tanda	4	Joseph Talamo	Mike R. Mitchell	Tommy Hutton's Dream Stable	6 1/2 furlongs	1:15.34	$147,000	III	
2010	Sweet August Moon	5	Victor Espinoza	Brian J. Koriner	Legacy Ranch & Team MacPherson	6 1/2 furlongs	1:16.40	$150,000	III	
2009	Carlsbad	3	Tyler Baze	Jeff Mullins	Dennis E. Weir	6 1/2 furlongs	1:14.93	$200,000	III	
2008	Dearest Trickski	4	Mike E. Smith	John W. Sadler	Tom Mankiewicz	6 1/2 furlongs	1:15.17	$200,000	III	
2007	River's Prayer	4	Clinton L. Potts	Paula S. Capestro	Bantry Farms, Paula S. Capestro & Martin Racing Stable	6 1/2 furlongs	1:17.85	$200,000	III	
2006	Behaving Badly	5	Victor Espinoza	Bob Baffert	Patti & Hal J. Earnhardt III	6 1/2 furlongs	1:15.04	$200,000	III	
2005	Behaving Badly	4	Victor Espinoza	Bob Baffert	Patti & Hal J. Earnhardt III	6 1/2 furlongs	1:15.32	$150,000	III	
2004	Dream of Summer	5	Mike E. Smith	Juan J. Garcia	James Weigel	6 1/2 furlongs	1:15.85	$150,000	III	
2003	Secret Liaison	5	Corey Nakatani	Ted H. West	Desperado Stables	6 1/2 furlongs	1:15.53	$150,000	III	
2002	Kalookan Queen	6	Alex O. Solis	Bruce Headley	Luis A. Asistio	6 1/2 furlongs	1:16.40	$150,000	III	
2001	Kalookan Queen	5	Alex O. Solis	Bruce Headley	Luis A. Asistio	6 1/2 furlongs	1:15.52	$150,000	III	
2000	Theresa's Tizzy	6	Laffit Pincay Jr.	Noble Threewitt	Bellestri, Johnson, Leach, et al	6 1/2 furlongs	1:16.23	$150,000	III	
1999	Enjoy the Moment	4	David R. Flores	William Spawr	Farfellow Farm	6 1/2 furlongs	1:15.97	$150,000	III	
1998	Advancing Star	5	Chris McCarron	Richard E. Mandella	Golden Eagle Farm	6 1/2 furlongs	1:14.64	$106,900	III	
1997	Track Gal	6	Gary L. Stevens	John W. Sadler	William H. Oldknow & Robert W. Phipps	6 1/2 furlongs	1:15.64	$109,125	III	
1996	Track Gal	5	Chris McCarron	John W. Sadler	William H. Oldknow & Robert W. Phipps	6 1/2 furlongs	1:14.64	$103,550	III	
1995	Track Gal	4	Chris McCarron	John W. Sadler	William H. Oldknow & Robert W. Phipps	6 1/2 furlongs	1:14.28	$103,025	III	
1994	Desert Stormer	4	Eddie Delahoussaye	Fabio Nor	Joanne H. Nor	6 1/2 furlongs	1:14.81	$107,800	III	
1993	Knight Prospector	4	Kent J. Desormeaux	Craig Anthony Lewis	Gaswirth & Mirage Stable	6 1/2 furlongs	1:16.40	$88,800	III	
1992	Bountiful Native	4	Pat Valenzuela	Dan L. Hendricks	Mr. & Mrs. Martin J. Wygod	6 1/2 furlongs	1:15.30	$106,525	III	
1991	Cascading Gold	5	Laffit Pincay Jr.	Neil D. Drysdale	Morven Stud Farm	6 1/2 furlongs	1:15.42	$94,475	III	
1990	Hot Novel	4	Kent J. Desormeaux	Fabio Nor	Joanne H. Nor	6 1/2 furlongs	1:14.60	$107,875	III	
1989	Kool Arrival	3	Laffit Pincay Jr.	Melvin F. Stute	Pete Valenti, John Coelho, & Philip Fields	6 1/2 furlongs	1:15.20	$81,375	III	
1988	Clabber Girl	5	Laffit Pincay Jr.	D. Wayne Lukas	John A. Nerud	6 1/2 furlongs	1:14.60	$65,750	III	
1987	Julie the Flapper	3	Chris McCarron	D. Wayne Lukas	Calumet Farm	6 1/2 furlongs	1:15.00	$55,700		
1986	Bold N Special	3	Chris McCarron	D. Wayne Lukas	Patricia A. & Cleber J. Massey	6 1/2 furlongs	1:14.60	$53,350		
1985	Take My Picture	3	Frank Olivares	Gary J. Lewis	L. G. & Helen Rhodes	6 furlongs	1:09.20	$55,700		
1984	Pleasure Cay	4	Laffit Pincay Jr.	Neil D. Drysdale	William S. Kilroy	6 furlongs	1:08.60	$54,750		
1983	Bara Lass	4	Chris McCarron	D. Wayne Lukas	Sam Edward Stevens	6 furlongs	1:09.40	$54,300		
1982	Lucky Lady Ellen	3	Laffit Pincay Jr.	D. Wayne Lukas	Cloyce Box	6 furlongs	1:08.60	$54,350		
1981	Forluvofiv	4	Eddie Delahoussaye	Karl Pew	Amy’s Racing Stable, Karl Pew & Tom Stadel	6 furlongs	1:09.40	$53,900		
1980	Great Lady M.	5	Laffit Pincay Jr.	D. Wayne Lukas	Robert H. Spreen	6 furlongs	1:08.60	$43,800		
1979	Fantastic Girl	3	Bill Shoemaker	Gary F. Jones	Golden Eagle Farm	6 furlongs	1:09.20	$38,500		
1978	Happy Holme	4	Chris McCarron	Warren Stute	Indian Hill Stable	6 furlongs	1:13.00	$31,700		
1977	Lullaby Song	4	Laffit Pincay Jr.	Roger E. Clapp	Mrs. Connie M. Ring	6 furlongs	1:09.00	$27,800		
1976	Mama Kali	5	Laffit Pincay Jr.	David E. Hofmans	Pearson’s Barn	6 furlongs	1:09.20	$27,650		
1975	Mama Kali	4	Jerry Lambert	David E. Hofmans	Pearson’s Barn	6 furlongs	1:09.20	$28,300		
1974	Impressive Style	4	Rudy Rosales	Bill McCormick	Johnston & Johnston	6 furlongs	1:08.60	$27,550		
1973	Fairly Certain	4	Steve Valdez	Theodore Saladin	Ada L. Martin	1 1/16 miles	1:42.80	$17,150	3YO & older	Division 1
1973	Dollar Discount	4	Steve Valdez	Theodore Saladin	Ada L. Martin	1 1/16 miles	1:43.20	$16,550	3YO & older	Division 2 Dead heat
1973	D. B. Carm	4	Fernando Toro	Sid Martin	Mr. & Mrs. S. N. Simmons	1 1/16 miles	1:43.20	$16,550	3YO & older	Division 2 Dead heat
1968–1972		Race not held								
1967	Sharp Decline	5	Raymond Bianco	Curt N. Sundlie	W. H. Cook	1 mile	1:33.80	$13,250	3YO & older	Division 1
1967	Quicken Tree	4	Bill Hartack	Clyde Turk	Louis R. Rowan & Wheelock Whitney, Jr.	1 mile	1:35.20	$13,325	3YO & older	Division 2

Legend:
All Weather Track Dirt Turf

== See also ==
List of American and Canadian Graded races
