= Judy the Beauty =

Canadian-bred Thoroughbred racehorse

- Sire: Ghostzapper
- Grandsire: Awesome Again
- Dam: Holy Blitz
- Damsire: Holy Bull
- Sex: Mare
- Foaled: 17 March 2009
- Country: Canada
- Colour: Chestnut
- Breeder: Adena Springs
- Owner: Wesley Ward
- Trainer: Wesley Ward
- Record: 18: 9-7-1
- Earnings: $1,662,122

Major wins
- Thoroughbred Club of America Stakes (2013); Las Flores Handicap (2014); Madison Stakes (2014); Rancho Bernardo Handicap (2014); Breeders' Cup Filly & Mare Sprint (2014)

Awards
- American Champion Female Sprint Horse (2014)

Judy the Beauty (foaled 17 March 2009) is a Canadian-bred, American-trained Thoroughbred racehorse. Bred by Adena Springs in Ontario, she has been owned and trained throughout her racing career by Wesley Ward who bought her for $20,000 as a yearling. As a juvenile, she won her first three races (including one on turf in France) before finishing second in the Spinaway Stakes. In a brief three-year-old season she finished second in all three of her races. In 2013 she established herself as one of the best female sprinters in North America, winning the Thoroughbred Club of America Stakes and finishing second to Groupie Doll in the Breeders' Cup Filly & Mare Sprint. She was even better at five, winning the Las Flores Handicap, Madison Stakes and Rancho Bernardo Handicap before ending her season with a win in the Breeders' Cup Filly & Mare Sprint. After her retirement, Judy the Beauty was inducted into the Canadian Horse Racing Hall of Fame in 2018.

== Background ==
Judy the Beauty is a chestnut mare with a white blaze bred in Ontario by Adena Springs. She is one of the best horses sired by Ghostzapper who was the American Horse of the Year and the World's Top Ranked Horse in 2004. Her dam Holy Blitz won three of her seven races and was a descendant of the influential broodmare La Troienne.

As a yearling, Judy the Beauty was sent to the Keeneland sales in September 2010, where she was bought for $20,000 by Wesley Ward. The Keeneland-based Ward has trained the mare throughout her racing career.

== Racing career ==
=== 2011: two-year-old season ===
Judy the Beauty made her track debut in a maiden race over four and a half furlongs on the synthetic Polytrack surface at Keeneland on 15 April 2011. Ridden by Jeffrey Sanchez, she started 11/10 favourite and won by one and three quarter lengths from Wish to Opine. She was then sent to race in Europe and won the Prix Caravelle over 1000 metres on turf at Chantilly Racecourse on 2 May, leading from the start and beating Ruby's Day by a neck. On her return to North America she won her third consecutive race when she took the Shady Well Stakes over 5 1/2 furlongs at Woodbine Racetrack, beating Dene Court by half length. On September 4 the filly was moved up in class to contest the Grade I Spinaway Stakes over seven furlongs at Saratoga Race Course. Starting favorite against seven opponents, she took the lead in the straight but was overtaken in the closing stages and beaten into second place by Grace Hall.

=== 2012: three-year-old season ===
After an absence of nine months, Judy the Beauty returned to the track and finished second in an allowance race over at Churchill Downs in June. In August she returned to Grade I company for the Prioress Stakes over six furlongs and finished second, beaten a nose by Emma's Encore. On her only other appearance of the season she finished second again, beaten one and a quarter lengths by the four-year-old Dust And Diamond in the Gallant Bloom Handicap at Belmont Park on September 22. In all three of her races in 2012 she was ridden by Joel Rosario.

=== 2013: four-year-old season ===
Judy the Beauty began her third season by winning an allowance race over six furlongs at Keeneland on April 25 and then finished second to Beat The Blues when favorite for the Grade III Winning Colors Stakes at Churchill Downs a month later. She then ran second to Starship Truffles in the Grade I Princess Rooney Handicap and third to Groupie Doll in the Masters Stakes at Presque Isle Downs.

On 5 October, Judy the Beauty met Groupie Doll again in the Grade II Thoroughbred Club of America Stakes over six furlongs at Keeneland. Ridden by John Velazquez she took the lead approaching the final furlong and won by a lengths from Gypsy Robin, with Groupie Doll three quarters of a length away in third. After the race, Ward said "I've owned this filly for a few years now, and I'm just elated. Any time you can have a home-court advantage (the horses have) a big advantage and that's what this filly had. She trains here every day. She's just outstanding."

On November 2 Judy the Beauty contested the seventh running of the Breeders' Cup Filly & Mare Sprint at Santa Anita Park, with Luis Saez taking over the ride for the injured Velazquez. After tracking the leaders in the early stages she made steady progress in the straight and finished second, half a length behind Groupie Doll.

=== 2014: five-year-old season ===
On her first appearance as a five-year-old, Judy the Beauty started 1/2 favorite for the Grade III Las Flores Stakes over six furlongs at Santa Anita on March 9. Ridden by Velazquez, she took the lead early in the stretch and won by four and three quarter lengths from Heir Kitty. Five weeks later the mare was moved up in class and distance and was made 3/5 favorite for the Grade I Madison Stakes over seven furlongs at Keeneland. Despite being forced to race four wide on the turn, she took the lead in the stretch and won by 2 1/2 lengths from Better Lucky. Ward said "I'm ecstatic. She's been so unlucky so many different times when she's been beaten right on the money. To finally vindicate with a grade 1 is just unbelievable. She's getting a lot more composed as she gets older. She used to be a little bit fractious saddling and a little nervous in the post parade. Now she just walks into the gate with a lot of class. Three weeks later the mare started odds-on favorite for the Humana Distaff Handicap at Churchill Downs but finished fourth behind Midnight Lucky, Street Girl and Scherzinger after fading in the stretch.

After a break of more than three months, Judy the Beauty returned in the Rancho Bernardo Stakes over six and a half furlong at Del Mar Racetrack on 17 August. Ridden by Mike Smith, she was well off the pace at half way but finished strongly to take the lead in the stretch and won by one and a half lengths from Madame Cactus, with the odds-on favorite Reneesgotzip in third. Smith commented, "Impressive; extremely impressive. I've been wanting to ride this mare for a long time. I finally got to and it sure looks like I picked the right day. She's something. She can run with any of them. Boys, too. Look out!"

On 1 November 2014 at Santa Anita, Judy the Beauty made her second attempt to win the Breeders' Cup Filly & Mare Sprint. Ridden again by Smith she started the 7/2 favorite against nine opponents including Artemis Agrotera (Ballerina Stakes), Stonetastic (Prioress Stakes), Sweet Reason (Acorn Stakes, Test Stakes) and Leigh Court (Thoroughbred Club of America Stakes). After tracking the leaders in the early stages, Smith moved the mare to the wide outside to make her challenge in the straight. She overtook the pace-setter Stonetastic a furlong out and then held the late challenge of Better Lucky to win by a head, with a gap of three lengths back to Thank You Marylou in third. After the race, Ward announced that the mare would remain in training, saying "With the Breeders' Cup at her home base of Keeneland next year, I've decided to keep her in training for another season. This is the kind of horse that keeps you going, keeps you working hard in this game. Horse racing is all about dreams coming true."

=== 2015: six-year-old season ===
Judy the Beauty did not fare well as a six-year-old, going winless in all four starts for the season. Her best finishes were seconds in the Gr.I Humana Distaff Handicap and Gr.II Honorable Miss Handicap, and a third in the Gr.II Thoroughbred Club of America Stakes. She ran again in the Filly and Mare Sprint to defend her title, but finished fifth behind winner Wavell Avenue.

== Retirement and Broodmare career ==
Judy the Beauty was retired in November 2015, after the Breeders' Cup Filly and Mare Sprint.

On April 22, 2017, Judy the Beauty foaled a chestnut filly by Triple Crown winner American Pharoah. Judy the Beauty was named into the Canadian Horse Racing Hall of Fame in 2018.

== Pedigree ==
Pedigree of Judy the Beauty, chestnut mare, 2009
Sire Ghostzapper (USA) 2000	Awesome Again (CAN); 1994	Deputy Minister	Vice Regent
Sire Ghostzapper (USA) 2000	Awesome Again (CAN); 1994	Deputy Minister	Mint Copy
Sire Ghostzapper (USA) 2000	Awesome Again (CAN); 1994	Primal Force	Blushing Groom
Sire Ghostzapper (USA) 2000	Awesome Again (CAN); 1994	Primal Force	Prime Propect
Sire Ghostzapper (USA) 2000	Baby Zip (USA); 1991	Relaunch	In Reality
Sire Ghostzapper (USA) 2000	Baby Zip (USA); 1991	Relaunch	Foggy Note
Sire Ghostzapper (USA) 2000	Baby Zip (USA); 1991	Thirty Zip	Tri Jet
Sire Ghostzapper (USA) 2000	Baby Zip (USA); 1991	Thirty Zip	Sailaway
Dam Holy Blitz (USA) 1997	Holy Bull (USA); 1991	Great Above	Minnesota Mac
Dam Holy Blitz (USA) 1997	Holy Bull (USA); 1991	Great Above	Ta Wee
Dam Holy Blitz (USA) 1997	Holy Bull (USA); 1991	Sharon Brown	Al Hattab
Dam Holy Blitz (USA) 1997	Holy Bull (USA); 1991	Sharon Brown	Agathea's Dawn
Dam Holy Blitz (USA) 1997	Pagofire (USA); 1991	Island Whirl	Pago Pago
Dam Holy Blitz (USA) 1997	Pagofire (USA); 1991	Island Whirl	Altawhirl
Dam Holy Blitz (USA) 1997	Pagofire (USA); 1991	Horsafire	Hold Your Peace
Dam Holy Blitz (USA) 1997	Pagofire (USA); 1991	Horsafire	She Can't Miss (Family:1-x)
