= Indian Blessing =

American-bred Thoroughbred racehorse

- Sire: Indian Charlie
- Grandsire: In Excess
- Dam: Shameful
- Damsire: Flying Chevron
- Sex: filly
- Foaled: 2005
- Country: United States
- Colour: Dark Bay/Brown
- Breeder: Patti & Hal J. Earnhardt III
- Owner: Patti & Hal J. Earnhardt III
- Trainer: Bob Baffert
- Record: 16: 10-5-0
- Earnings: $2,995,420

Major wins
- Frizette Stakes (2007); Santa Ynez Stakes (2008); Silverbulletday Stakes (2008); Prioress Stakes (2008); Test Stakes (2008); Gallant Bloom Handicap (2008, 2009); La Brea Stakes (2008) Breeders' Cup wins: Breeders' Cup Juvenile Fillies (2007)

Awards
- American Champion Two-Year-Old Filly (2007); American Champion Female Sprint Horse (2008)
- Last updated on 16 February 2022

Indian Blessing (foaled April 9, 2005, in Kentucky) is an American Thoroughbred racehorse who was the American Champion Two-Year-Old Filly in 2007 and Champion Female Sprint Horse in 2008.

== Background ==
Indian Blessing was bred by and raced for Patti and Hal Earnhardt, who also raced both her sire, Indian Charlie, and dam, Shameful. Indian Charlie won the 1998 Santa Anita Derby and then finished third in the Kentucky Derby, his final start. Shameful was purchased on behalf of the Earnhardts for $50,000 and went on to win several races including the Pine Tree Lane Stakes.

== Racing career ==
=== 2007: two-year-old season ===
Trained by Bob Baffert, Indian Blessing went undefeated in three starts at age two in front running fashion. She won her first start on August 30 in a sprint race at Saratoga Race Course, running very close to the track record. She then won the one-mile Grade I Frizette Stakes at Belmont Park on October 6 by 4 1/2 lengths. In her final race of 2007, she won the Grade I Breeders' Cup Juvenile Fillies by 3½ lengths on a sloppy track at Monmouth Park Racetrack in Oceanport, New Jersey. Her 2007 performances earned Indian Blessing the Eclipse Award as American Champion Two-Year-Old Filly.

=== 2008: three-year-old season ===
Indian Blessing began her three-year-old campaign on January 13 with a win in the Grade II Santa Ynez Stakes at Santa Anita Park in California. Her time of 1:19.64 for 7 furlongs set a record for the then new Cushion-track surface. She kept her unbeaten record intact with a win in the February 9 running of the Silverbulletday Stakes at the Fair Grounds Race Course in Louisiana, holding off Proud Spell in the stretch to win by a length. However Proud Spell then beat her in the Fair Grounds Oaks on March 8. Baffert said, "[Her jockey] tried to get her to slow down, but she was fighting him. We realized that you've got to just let her go or she's not going to give you that extra kick."

Baffert gave the filly a layoff, then entered her in the Acorn Stakes on June 7 at a distance of one mile. Indian Blessing set fast opening fractions but was passed by Zaftig (Horse) in the stretch, finishing second by 4½ lengths. Acorn Stakes She rebounded with a win in the six-furlong Prioress Stakes, where she broke poorly and then raced from off the pace for the first time, pulling clear of the field in the stretch. Baffert said, "So, now we know she can rate and that is a dimension you always want to see."

On August 2 in the Test Stakes, heavily favored Indian Blessing left five other 3-year-old fillies at the quarter pole and drew away to a 7-length victory, covering the 7 furlongs in 1:22.70. On September 20, she took on older mares for the first time, winning the Gallant Bloom Handicap by 6¼ lengths. She entered the Breeders' Cup Filly & Mare Sprint on October 24 at Santa Anita as the favorite, but was passed in the stretch by Ventura to finish second.

Indian Blessing finished her three-year-old campaign by winning her fifth Grade I race, the 7-furlong La Brea Stakes, in 1:20:89 on December 27, 2008. The race was marred by the injury of Indyanne, who battled Indian Blessing for the win. “This was a bittersweet win," Baffert said. "I’m very sad about what happened to (Indyanne)." Indian Blessing was awarded the Eclipse Award as American Champion Female Sprint Horse for 2008. "We feel very, very fortunate. It's an 'all-in-the-family' situation starting many years ago," said her owner Hal Earnhardt, referring to the fact that he had also bred Indian Blessing's sire. "We might not ever be in this position again, so, like her name says, we're blessed to be here."

=== 2009: four-year-old season ===
In her first start in 2009, the $2-million Dubai Golden Shaheen (UAE-I) on March 28 at Nad Al Sheba, Indian Blessing lost by barely half a length to Big City Man after stumbling at the start. Scheduled to race next in the Grade I Humana Distaff Handicap on Derby Day, the filly was scratched after behaving listlessly before the race. Indian Blessing ran in the Desert Stormer Handicap, her first start at Hollywood Park, and finished fourth, the first time she had ever run out of the money. She then got sick and was treated with antibiotics, which necessitated her being scratched from the 2009 running of the Grade I Princess Rooney Handicap at Calder.

On August 29, 2009, Indian Blessing finished second behind Music Note in the Grade I Ballerina Stakes on a sloppy track. On September 26, 2009, she rebounded to win her second consecutive Gallant Bloom Handicap, this time by a nose over Sara Louise after a lengthy stretch battle. |She put up a really good fight today," said jockey John Velazquez. "I tell you, the other filly was a brave one, too. She kept coming back to me. The more I asked my filly, the more the other one kept coming back. It was a good effort for both fillies."

Baffert decided to bypass the 2009 Breeders' Cup as he felt the filly did not run her best on the synthetic surface then in place at Santa Anita. Instead Indian Blessing was retired with a record of 10 wins and five second-place finishes from 16 starts.

== Breeding record ==
As of 2020, Indian Blessing has produced five named foals:

- a 2011 gelding by Zensational named Indian Smoke – retired in 2015 with a record of 8: 1–1–0.
- a 2013 colt by Smart Strike named Ten Blessings – euthanized in 2018 following a breakdown in the Kona Gold Stakes. His race record was of 8: 3–1–1.
- a 2014 filly by Tapit named Life's Blessings – retired in 2018 with a record of 12: 2–3–1.
- a 2015 gelding by Misremembered named Houston Mesa. Unraced.
- a 2016 filly by Pioneroof the Nile named Indian Gardens. Unraced.
