= 2020 Road to the Kentucky Oaks =

Series of horse races

The 2020 Road to the Kentucky Oaks is a points system by which Thoroughbred fillies will qualify for the 2020 Kentucky Oaks, which will be held on September 4 (rescheduled from the traditional first Saturday in May due to the coronavirus pandemic). The field for the Kentucky Oaks, the filly equivalent of the Kentucky Derby, is limited to fourteen horses, with up to four "also eligible" horses in case of a late withdrawal from the field.

Originally, the 30 races in the Road to the Kentucky Oaks were to be held from September 2019 (when the fillies are age two) through April 2020 (when they have turned three). However, in March 2020, the growing coronavirus pandemic prompted the cancellation of several prep races, and the rescheduling of the Oaks itself. Churchill Downs is currently considering adding more qualifying races to the series with points to be determined. The top four finishers in the specified races earn points, with the highest point values awarded in the major preparatory races. Earnings in non-restricted stakes act as a tie breaker.

Fillies who instead wish to enter the Kentucky Derby have to earn the necessary points in the races on the Road to the Kentucky Derby: points earned on the Road to the Kentucky Oaks are not transferable. However, if a filly does earn qualifying points for the Derby by racing in open company, those points also count towards qualifying for the Oaks.

== Standings ==
The following table shows the points earned in the eligible races for the main series as of May 2, 2020.

Rank	Horse	Points	Owner	Trainer	Eligible Earnings (Note: Non-Restricted Stakes Earnings, used as a tie-breaker)	Ref
1	Swiss Skydiver	310	Peter J. Callahan	Kenneth G. McPeek	$386,820	
2	Bonny South	100	Juddmonte Farms	Brad H. Cox	$240,000	
3	Finite	80	Winchell Thoroughbreds LLC, Thomas J. Reiman, William Dickson, Debo Easter	Steve Asmussen	$540,349	
4	Shedaresthedevil	70	Flurry Racing Stables LLC, Qatar Racing Limited & Big Aut Farms	Brad H. Cox	$265,600	
5	Donna Veloce	62	Kaleem Shah Inc., Susan Magnier, Michael B. Tabor & Derrick Smith	Simon Callaghan	$460,000	
6	Tonalist's Shape	60	Slam Dunk Racing, Dough Branham, Legacy Ranch, Inc.	Saffie A. Joseph Jr.	$258,680	
7	Water White	54	E.V. Racing Stable	Rudy R. Rodriguez	$175,375	
8	British Idiom	50	Michael Dubb, Elkstone Group, Madaket Stables & Bethlehem Stables	Brad H. Cox	$1,400,000	
not nominated	Down on Da Bayou	50	Hamdan Al Maktoum	S. Bin Ghadayer	$200,000	
9	Venetian Harbor	50	Ciaglia Racing LLC, Highland Yard & River Oak Farm	Richard Baltas	$200,000	
10	Lucrezia	50	Edward A. Seltzer & Beverly S. Anderson	Arnaud Delacour	$131,200	
11	Tempers Rising	47	Mark H. Stanley & Nancy W. Stanley	Dallas Stewart	$107,000	
12	Lake Avenue	35	Godolphin	Bill Mott	$171,989	
injured	Bast	34	Baoma Corp	Bob Baffert	$840,000	
13	Alta's Award	30	Ed & Susie Orr	Steve Asmussen	$72,000	
not nominated	Dubai Love	20	Godolphin	Saeed Bin Suroor	$200,000	
not nominated	Queen of God	20	Winners Circle Racing Stable	Mike Maker	$124,504	
14	Antoinette	20	Godolphin	Bill Mott	$95,000	
not nominated	Kansas Kis	20	Perrine Time Thoroughbreds	Raymond Handal	$54,639	
15	Spice Is Nice	20	Lawana L. & Robert E. Low	Todd Pletcher	$43,980	
16	Speech	20	Eclipse Thoroughbred Partners	Michael McCarthy	$20,000	
17	Motu	16	Susan Moulton, David A. Bernsen LLC & Magdalena Racing	Kenneth G. McPeek	$98,200	
18	Wicked Whisper	10	Alex & JoAnn Lieblong	Steve Asmussen	$280,000	
19	Lazy Daisy	10	ERJ Racing, Great Friends Stable, Tom Mansor	Doug O'Neill	$159,169	
20	Serein	10	Koji Maeda	Matsunaga, M	$157,520	
injured	Taraz	10	Juddmonte Farms	Brad H. Cox	$138,000	
21	Harvey's Lil Goil	10	Estate of Harvey A. Clarke & Paul Braverman	Bill Mott	$55,889	
not nominated	Panthera Onca	10	Narola LLC	Brad H. Cox	$50,000	
22	Dream Marie	10	Miracle's International Trading, Inc.	Matthew Williams	$21,200	
23	Storie Blue	10	Don Alberto Stable	Bob Baffert	$12,000	
not nominated	Bajan Girl	10	Robert Slack & Daniel Walters	Rohan Crichton	$9,300	
24	Pass the Plate	8	Silverton Hill LLC	Paul McGee	$35,700	
25	Perfect Alibi	6	Tracy Farmer	Mark Casse	$512,500	
26	Comical	5	ERJ Racing, Gary Barber, Dave Kenney, Madaket Stables & Westside Racing	Doug O'Neill	$203,851	
27	Gingham	5	Sarah Kelly & Jane Wiltz	Bob Baffert	$58,000	
not nominated	Ascot Brass (SWE)	5	Stall Valley	Niels Petersen	$20,000	
not nominated	Queen Bridget	5	Mary Ann Gould	John Ortiz	$15,000	
28	Reluctant Bride	5	D P Racing LLC & Patrick L. Biancone Racing LLC	Patrick L. Biancone	$10,600	
29	Paige Anne	5	Elie Feghali, Lori R. Feghali & Mark Mathiesen	Simon Callaghan	$6,000	
30	Frank's Rockette	4	Frank Fletcher Racing	Bill Mott	$236,035	
31	Maedean	4	Courtlandt Farms	Mark Hennig	$136,500	
32	K P Dreamin	4	Karl Pergola	Jeff Mullins	$96,000	
33	His Glory	4	Ben & Shelia Rollins	Tom Amoss	$56,350	
34	Ursula	4	Mt. Brilliant Stable LLC & Orrin Ingram	Michael Stidham	$48,000	
35	Auberge	4	Speedway Stable LLC	Bob Baffert	$40,000	
36	Turtle Trax	4	Brereton C. Jones	Ian R. Wilkes	$30,730	
37	O Seraphina	4	Scott Dilworth, Evan Dilworth, Randy & Susan Andrews	Joe Sharp	$30,000	
	Street of Dreams	4	Lothenbach Stables, Inc.	Ian R. Wilkes	$29,700	
38	Impeccable Style	4	Gainesway Stable, Catalyst Stable, Paul McInnis, Patty Slevin LLC & Magdalena Racing	Kenny McPeek	$20,100	
39	Portrait	3	LNJ Foxwoods	Brad H. Cox	$25,400	
40	Laura's Light	2	Gary Barber	Peter Miller	$136,370	
41	High on Gin	2	Jerry Caroom	Carl J. Deville	$112,444	
42	Lady Glamour	2	Inga Demeritte	Larry W. Demeritte	$67,030	
43	Slam Dunk	2	Magic Cap Stables	Rodolphe Brisset	$48,000	
44	Stellar Sound	2	Don Alberto Stable	Bob Baffert	$42,000	
45	Alandra	2	Helen Alexander & Helen Groves	C. R. McGaughey III	$41,500	
not nominated	Blame Debbie	2	Courtlandt Farms	H. Graham Motion	$30,000	
	Golden Principle	2	Karl Watson, Mike Pegram, Paul Weitman	Bob Baffert	$24,000	
46	Nikki and Papa	2	Ron Paolucci Racing, LLC, Todd Cady, Leigh Anderson-Butler, Jeffrey Lambert, Steve Melen, Nydia M. Sigband	Robert B. Hess Jr.	$16,850	
47	FiftyShays OfGreen	2	Leonard C. Green & Sean Shay	John Servis	$14,000	
	Princesinha Julia	1	Three Chimneys Farm, LLC	Steve Asmussen	$67,500	
	Gone Glimmering	1	Sandra New & Aaron Haberman	Tom Amoss	$20,000	
not nominated	Fujairah	1	Three Rivers Stable Inc	Carlos A. David	$35,244	
not nominated	Orquidias Biz	1	Gulliver Racing LLC	Jeff Mullins	$32,500	
48	Ice Princess	1	Flying P Stable, R.A. Hill Stable, Come Racing Stable	Danny Gargan	$24,889	
	Been Studying Her	1	KMN Racing	Dan Ward	$18,000	
not nominated	She Can't Sing	1	Lothenbach Stables, Inc	Chris M. Block	$16,050	
	Critical Value	1	Ten Strike Racing	Jeremiah C. Englehart	$15,000	
	Go Big Blue Nation	1	Cannon Thoroughbreds, LLC	Michael W. McCarthy	$12,000	
not nominated	Persisto	1	Cavallino Racing LLC & Team USA Thoroughbreds	Kelly J. Breen	$9,750	
not nominated	Blood Curdling	1	PTK, LLC	Dane Kobiskie	$9,700	

- Did not qualify/Not nomininated/Injured/Bypassing the race in gray

== Race results ==
The dates for some upcoming races shown below are based on the placement in the racing calendar from 2018/2019. Similarly, the purses shown for upcoming races are based on the amounts from the previous year and will be updated when finalized.

=== Prep season ===
Kentucky Oaks prep season
Race	Distance	Purse	Track	Date	1st	2nd	3rd	4th	Ref
Pocahontas	1 1/16 miles	$200,000	Churchill Downs	Sep 14, 2019	Lazy Daisy	His Glory	Portrait	Blood Curdling	
Chandelier	1 1/16 miles	$300,000	Santa Anita	Sep 27, 2019	Bast	Comical	K P Dreamin	Been Studying Her	
Alcibiades	1 1/16 miles	$400,000	Keeneland	Oct 4, 2019	British Idiom	Perfect Alibi	Alandra	Gone Glimmering	
Frizette	1 mile	$400,000	Belmont	Oct 6, 2019	Wicked Whisper	Frank's Rockette	Slam Dunk	Ice Princess	
Breeders' Cup Juvenile Fillies	1 1/16 miles	$2,000,000	Santa Anita	Nov 2, 2019	British Idiom	Donna Veloce	Bast	Perfect Alibi	
Golden Rod	1 1/16 miles	$200,000	Churchill Downs	Nov 30, 2019	Finite	Motu	Lady Glamour	She Can't Sing	
Demoiselle	1 1/8 miles	$250,000	Aqueduct	Dec 7, 2019	Lake Avenue	Maedean	Blame Debbie	Critical Value	
Starlet	1 1/16 miles	$300,000	Los Alamitos	Dec 7, 2019	Bast	Donna Veloce	KP Dreamin	Gingham	
Santa Ynez	6 1/2 furlongs	$125,000	Santa Anita	Jan 5, 2020	Bast	Auberge	Golden Principal	Orquidias Biz	
Silverbulletday	1 mile 70 yards	$150,000	Fair Grounds	Jan 18, 2020	Finite	Ursula	Tempers Rising	Portrait	
Forward Gal	7 furlongs	$200,000	Gulfstream	Feb 1, 2020	Tonalist's Shape	Street of Dreams	Nikki and Papa	Fujairah	
Martha Washington	1 mile	$125,000	Oaklawn	Feb 1, 2020	Taraz	O Seraphina	High on Gin	Princesinha Julia	
Busanda	1 mile 70 yards	$100,000	Aqueduct	Feb 2, 2020	Harvey's Lil Goil	Water White	Fiftyshays Ofgreen	Persisto	
Las Virgenes	1 mile	$300,000	Santa Anita	Feb 8, 2020	Venetian Harbor	Gingham	Stellar Sound	Go Big Blue Nation	
Suncoast Stakes	1 mile 40 yards	$150,000	Tampa Bay	Feb 8, 2020	Lucrezia	Turtle Trax	Motu	Comical	
Note: 1st=10 points; 2nd=4 points; 3rd=2 points; 4th=1 point, except the Juvenile Fillies, for which the points are doubled

=== Championship series events ===
Race	Distance	Purse	Track	Date	1st	2nd	3rd	4th	Ref
Rachel Alexandra	1 1/16 miles	$200,000	Fair Grounds	Feb 15, 2020	Finite	British Idiom	Swiss Skydiver	Tempers Rising	
UAE Oaks	1,900 metres (~1 3/16 miles)	$250,000	Meydan	Feb 20, 2019	Down on Da Bayou	Dubai Love	Serein	Ascot Brass	
Davona Dale	1 1/16 miles	$200,000	Gulfstream	Mar 1, 2020	Tonalist's Shape	Spice Is Nice	Dream Marie	Reluctant Bride	
Busher	1 1/16 miles	$125,000	Aqueduct	Mar 7, 2020	Water White	Kansas Kis	Panthera Onca	Lake Avenue	
Honeybee	1 1/16 miles	$200,000	Oaklawn	Mar 7, 2020	Shedaresthedevil	Alta's Award	Motu	Queen Bridget	
Santa Ysabel Stakes	1 1/16 miles	$100,000	Santa Anita Park	Mar 8, 2020	Donna Veloce	Speech	Storie Blue	Paige Anne	
Sunland Park Oaks	1 1/16 miles	$200,000	Sunland	Mar 22, 2020	Cancelled (Note: Due to the COVID-19 pandemic in the United States the administration of Sunland Park cancelled the event)				
Note: 1st=50 points; 2nd=20 points; 3rd=10 points; 4th=5 points
Second leg of series
Race	Distance	Purse	Track	Date	1st	2nd	3rd	4th	Ref
Fair Grounds Oaks	1 1/16 miles	$400,000	Fair Grounds	Mar 21, 2020	Bonny South	Tempers Rising	Antionette	Finite	
Gulfstream Oaks	1 1/16 miles	$250,000	Gulfstream	Mar 28, 2020	Swiss Skydiver	Lucrezia	Lake Avenue	Bajan Girl	
Gazelle	1 1/8 miles	$300,000	Aqueduct	Postponed					
Ashland	1 1/16 miles	$500,000	Keeneland	Apr 4, 2020	Speech	Venetian Harbor	Envoutante	Bonny South	
Fantasy (Note: Due to the COVID-19 pandemic in the United States the administration of Oaklawn Park moved the Fantasy Stakes to May 1 and lowered the purse)	1 1/16 miles	$600,000	Oaklawn	May 1, 2020	Swiss Skydiver	Venetian Harbor	Shedaresthedevil	Alta's Award	
Santa Anita Oaks	1 1/16 miles	$400,000	Santa Anita	June 6, 2020 (Note: Originally scheduled for 4 April but due to the COVID-19 pandemic in the United States, the administration of the track with instructions received from Los Angeles County Health Department postponed racing at Santa Anita until further notice)	Swiss Skydiver	Speech	Merneith	Regal Beauty	
Note: 1st=100 points; 2nd=40 points; 3rd=20 points; 4th=10 points
"Wild Card"
Race	Distance	Purse	Track	Date	1st	2nd	3rd	4th	Ref
Bourbonette Oaks	1 mile	$100,000	Turfway	Mar 14, 2020	Queen of God	Pass the Plate	Impeccable Style	Laura's Light	
Beaumont	7 furlongs	$150,000	Keeneland	Apr 5, 2020	Cancelled (Note: Due to the COVID-19 pandemic in the United States the administration of Keeneland cancelled the Spring meeting between April 2–24 including the Blue Grass Stakes)				
Bourbonette Oaks: 1st=20 points; 2nd=8 points; 3rd=4 points; 4th=2 points Beaumont Stakes: 1st=10 points; 2nd=4 points; 3rd=2 points; 4th=1 points

=== Extended series events ===
The following preliminary list of races have been announced for the extension of the Road to the Kentucky Oaks. These races have been added to the 2020 Road to the Kentucky Oaks as a result of the Oaks being run in September instead of May.

Dogwood Stakes (20-8-4-2)

1: Four Graces, 2: Edgeway, 3: Bayerness, 4: Lady Glamour

Acorn Stakes (G1, 50-20-10-5)

1: Gamine, 2: Pleasant Orb, 3: Water White, 4: Lucrezia

Delaware Oaks (G3, 50-20-10-5)

1: Project Whiskey 2: Dream Marie 3: Princess Cadey 4: Piece of My Heart

Indiana Oaks (G3, 20-8-4-2)

1: Shedaresthedevil 2: Impeccable Style 3: Bayerness 4: Fire Coral

Beaumont Stakes (G3, 20-8-4-2)

1: Four Graces 2: Sconsin 3: Turtle Trax 4: Wicked Whisper

Ashland Stakes (G1, 100-40-20-10)

1: Speech 2: Venetian Harbor 3: Envoutante 4: Bonny South

Coaching Club American Oaks (G1, 100-40-20-10) Saratoga, July 18

1: Paris Lights 2: Crystal Ball 3: Antoinette 4: Tonalist's Shape

Monmouth Oaks (G3, 50-20-10-5) Monmouth Park, August 1

1: Hopeful Growth 2: Project Whiskey 3: Eve of War 4: Dream Marie

Audubon Oaks (10-4-2-1)

1: Mundaye Call 2: Ocean Breeze 3: Sconsin 4: Truth Hurts

Alabama Stakes (G1, 100-40-20-10) Saratoga, August 15

1: Swiss Skydiver 2: Bonny South 3: Harvey's Lil Goil 4: Envoutante

== See also ==
- 2020 Road to the Kentucky Derby
