= Covfefe (horse) =

American racehorse

- Sire: Into Mischief
- Grandsire: Harlan's Holiday
- Dam: Antics
- Damsire: Unbridled
- Sex: Filly
- Foaled: February 22, 2016
- Country: United States
- Color: Bay
- Breeder: Alexander-Groves Thoroughbreds
- Owner: LNJ Foxwoods
- Trainer: Brad H. Cox
- Record: 8: 6-0-1
- Earnings: $1,110,025

Major wins
- Miss Preakness Stakes (2019); Test Stakes (2019); Dogwood Stakes (2019) Breeders' Cup wins: Breeders' Cup Filly & Mare Sprint (2019)

Awards
- American Champion Three-Year-Old Filly (2019); American Champion Female Sprint Horse (2019)

Covfefe (foaled February 22, 2016) is a retired American Thoroughbred racehorse who won two Eclipse Awards in 2019 as the American Champion Three-Year-Old Filly and American Champion Female Sprint Horse. She won five of six starts that year including the Test Stakes and the Breeders' Cup Filly & Mare Sprint. She also broke the Pimlico track record for six furlongs by over a second in the Miss Preakness.

== Background ==
Covfefe is a bay filly with a large white blaze who was bred in Kentucky by Alexander-Groves Thoroughbreds. Her sire is Into Mischief, who won the Los Alamitos Futurity then developed into an outstanding sire, known primarily for his sprinters like Goldencents and Practical Joke. Covfefe was Into Mischief's top earner in 2019 when he earned the title of leading sire in North America. Covfefe is out of Antics by Unbridled. Antics is from a distinguished female family that traces to Courtly Dee, the 1983 Kentucky Broodmare of the Year. The family has produced multiple stakes winners including Arch, Althea, Acoma and Japanese champion Yamamin Paradise.

Covfefe was sold as a yearling at the 2017 Keeneland September Sale for $250,000 to Alex Solis and Jason Litt acting as agents for LNJ Foxwoods. The stable is owned by Larry, Nanci and Jaime Roth, and is run by Jaime Roth. Covfefe was trained by Brad Cox, who also trained the champion three-year-old filly of 2018, Monomoy Girl. In a play on the names of her sire and dam, Covfefe is named after a viral tweet from 2017 by President of the United States Donald Trump.

== Racing career ==
=== 2018: two-year-old season ===
Covfefe made her debut on September 16, 2018, in a maiden special weight race over six furlongs at Churchill Downs. Despite her lack of experience, she was the heavy favorite at odds of 1–2. She went to the early lead, running the first quarter-mile in 22.34 seconds and the half in 46.52. Entering the stretch, she started to open up her lead and won by 9 1/4 lengths.

For her next start on October 7, Covfefe was stepped sharply up in class to the Grade I Frizette Stakes at Belmont Park. She was bumped at the start and struggled for early position, then was carried four wide around the turn. She closed to within one length of Jaywalk at the head of the stretch but then faded to finish a well beaten fourth.

=== 2019: three-year-old season ===
Covfefe made her three-year-old debut on April 6, 2019, at Keeneland in an allowance race over 6 1/2 furlongs. She broke slowly from post position one and was hustled to the lead, completing the first quarter-mile in 22.10 seconds. Take Charge Angel tracked her in second place, a half length behind as they turned into the stretch. Covfefe started to open up the lead but Take Charge Angel started closing in the final furlong. Covfefe held her off to win by half a length in a time of 1:16.84.

On May 17, Covfefe won the Miss Preakness Stakes by 8 1/2 lengths in front-running fashion while setting a track record of 1.07.70 for six furlongs at Pimlico. "I know she's a good filly, and she's just a superfast horse," said jockey Javier Castellano. "It didn't surprise me the way she performed today. I felt we were going fast, but (going in 1:07) didn't go through my mind once." She finished third though in her next start in the Roxelana Overnight Stakes at Churchill Downs after entering in an early speed duel with Mia Mischief and tiring in the final furlong.

On August 3, Covfefe returned to Grade I company in the Test Stakes at Saratoga over a distance of seven furlongs. She was the third betting choice behind Bellafina (Chandelier, Santa Anita Oaks) and Serengeti Empress (Kentucky Oaks). She tracked the early pace set by Serengeti Empress while racing wide around the turn. The two fillies dueled down the stretch as Covfefe inched her way ahead to win by half a length. "I knew when we turned for home," said Cox, "we were going to get as good a Covfefe as we could get at this point of the year. I knew when she turned for home, she wasn't going to give in today." "It was the kind of race that the fans were hoping for," said Tom Amoss, the trainer of Serengetti Empress. "For myself personally — I wish it had gone the other way — what a great stretch duel. We got beat by a wonderful performance by our opponent, Covfefe."

To prepare for the upcoming Breeders' Cup, Covfefe entered the Dogwood Stakes on September 21 at Churchill Downs. She was the heavy favorite at odds of 1–5 in a field of six. She stalked the early pace set by Take Charge Angel, then made her move turning for home. She drew off down the stretch to win by eight lengths in a time of 1:20.51, a new stakes record and just 0.07 seconds off the track record set by Groupie Doll. "She's definitely the most talented horse LNJ has ever owned," said Jaime Roth. "She's so special to us and such a talent. The only bad race she's ever run was in the Frizette last year, but that was a big ask that day in that spot. She's just very special."

Covfefe made her final start of the year in the Breeders' Cup Filly & Mare Sprint at Santa Anita on November 2. She was the 3-2 favorite in a field of nine that included Grade I winners Come Dancing, Bellafina and Spiced Perfection. She settled in third place, a few lengths behind the early pace set by Danuska's My Girl and Heavenhasmynikki. Turning into the stretch, she started to make up ground while splitting between horses. She opened a lead of 2 1/2 lengths in mid-stretch then held off a late run by Bellafina to win by three-quarters of a length. "Coming out of the one hole, there were a couple horses that showed more speed out of there," said jockey Joel Rosario. "I was able to work my way out [from the rail] and get her in the clear. After that, she did all the work."

Covfefe was named the American Champion Three-Year-Old Filly and American Champion Female Sprint Horse of 2019. She is the first horse to win both these honors in the same year. Cox cited her performance in the Miss Preakness, where she broke the track record by over a second, as one of her best performances. "I'll never forget standing in the grandstand, looking at the fractions, and thinking... and then listening to Dave Rodman's call of the race. I think he used the term 'super filly,'" he said. "It was amazing to watch, but watching her train leading up to that last year, it was believable. She's special."

== Retirement ==
As part of LNJ Foxwood's focus on building up a breeding operation, Covfefe was retired in February 2020 and now resides at Gainesway Farm. She was bred to Constitution in 2020.

== Statistics ==
Date	Age	Distance	Race	Grade	Track	Odds	Field	Finish	Winning Time	Winning (Losing) Margin	Jockey	Ref
Sep 16, 2018	2	6 furlongs	Maiden Special Weight		Churchill Downs	0.50*	9	1	1:10.20	9 1/4 lengths	Shaun Bridgmohan	
Oct 7, 2018	2	1 mile	Frizette Stakes	I	Belmont Park	0.65*	7	4	1:34.57	(9 lengths)	Javier Castellano	
Apr 6, 2019	3	6 1/2 furlongs	Allowance race		Keeneland	0.40*	10	1	1:16.84	1/2 length	Javier Castellano	
May 17, 2019	3	6 furlongs	Miss Preakness Stakes	III	Pimlico	1.80*	9	1	1:07.70 (Note: New track record)	8 1/2 lengths	Javier Castellano	
Jun 22, 2019	3	6 furlongs	Roxelana Overnight Stakes		Churchill Downs	0.40*	5	3	1:09.76	(3/4 length)	Shaun Bridgmohan	
Aug 3, 2019	3	7 furlongs	Test Stakes	I	Saratoga	3.25	7	1	1:21.26	1/2 length	Joel Rosario	
Sep 21, 2019	3	7 furlongs	Dogwood Stakes	III	Churchill Downs	0.20*	6	1	1:20.51 (Note: New stakes record)	8 lengths	Shaun Bridgmohan	
Nov 2, 2019	3	7 furlongs	Breeders' Cup Filly & Mare Sprint	I	Santa Anita	1.50*	9	1	1:22.40	3/4 length	Joel Rosario	

An asterisk after the odds means Covfefe was the post-time favorite.

== Pedigree ==
Pedigree of Covfefe, bay filly, February 22, 2016
Sire Into Mischief	Harlan's Holiday	Harlan	Storm Cat
Sire Into Mischief	Harlan's Holiday	Harlan	Country Romance
Sire Into Mischief	Harlan's Holiday	Christmas in Aiken	Affirmed
Sire Into Mischief	Harlan's Holiday	Christmas in Aiken	Dowager
Sire Into Mischief	Leslie's Lady	Tricky Creek	Clever Trick
Sire Into Mischief	Leslie's Lady	Tricky Creek	Battle Creek Girl
Sire Into Mischief	Leslie's Lady	Crystal Lady	Stop the Music
Sire Into Mischief	Leslie's Lady	Crystal Lady	One Last Bird
Dam Antics	Unbridled	Fappiano	Mr. Prospector
Dam Antics	Unbridled	Fappiano	Killaloe
Dam Antics	Unbridled	Gana Facil	*Le Fabuleux
Dam Antics	Unbridled	Gana Facil	Charedi
Dam Antics	Aurora	Danzig	Northern Dancer
Dam Antics	Aurora	Danzig	Pas de Nom
Dam Antics	Aurora	Althea	Alydar
Dam Antics	Aurora	Althea	Courtly Dee (family A4)

== See also ==
- Barack Obama (horse)
