= Goodnight Olive =

American racehorse

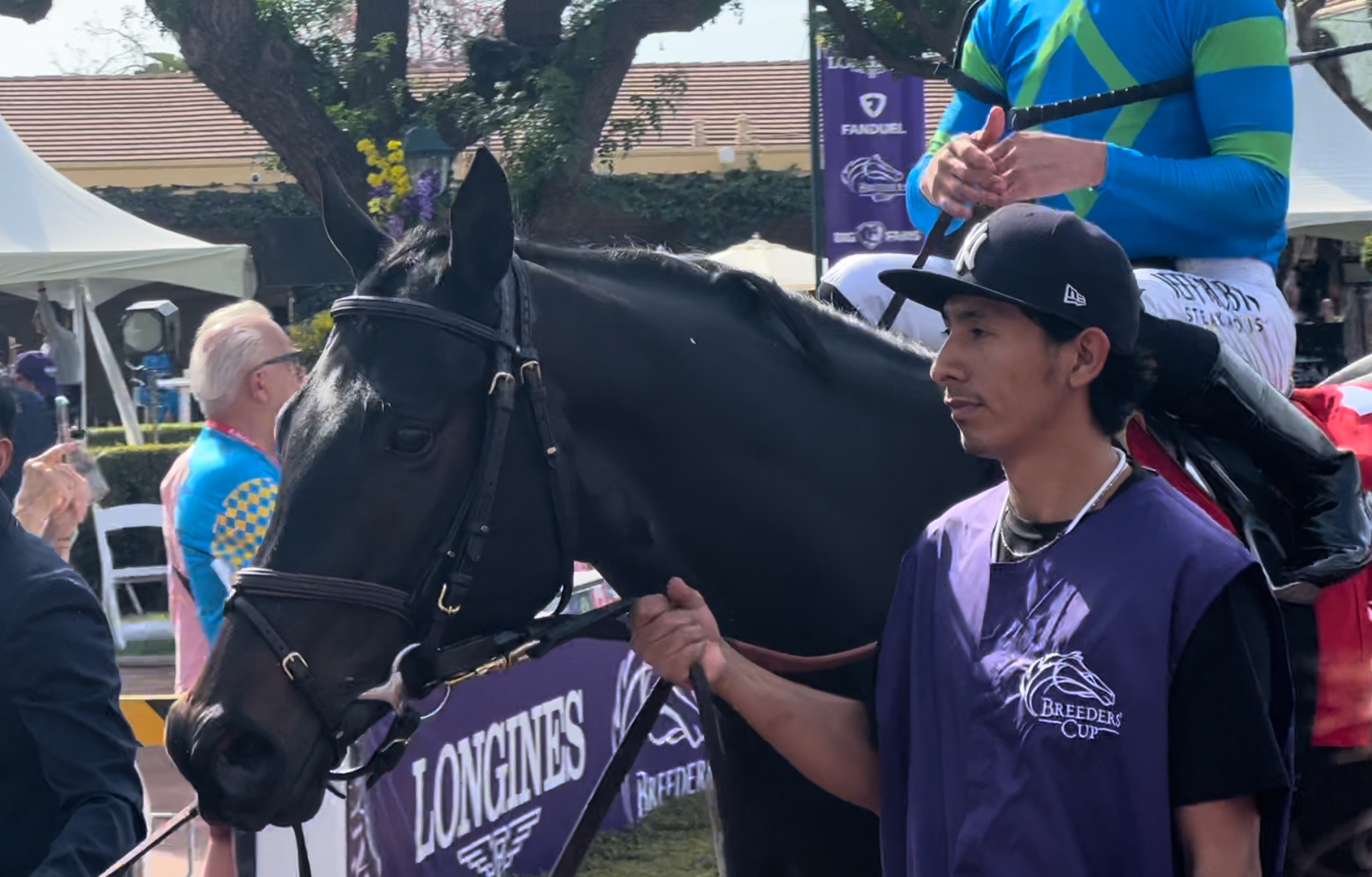
- Goodnight Olive right before the 2023 Breeders Cup Filly and Mare Sprint
- Sire: Ghostzapper
- Grandsire: Awesome Again
- Dam: Salty Strike
- Damsire: Smart Strike
- Sex: Mare
- Foaled: April 30, 2018 (age 8)
- Country: United States
- Colour: Dark Bay or Brown
- Breeder: Stonestreet Thoroughbred Holdings
- Owner: First Row Partners & Team Hanley (2019 – 2023); Resolute Bloodstock (2023 – )
- Trainer: Chad C. Brown
- Record: 12: 9–2–1
- Earnings: $2,196,200

Major wins
- Ballerina Handicap (2022); Madison Stakes (2023); Bed O' Roses Stakes (2023); Breeders' Cup wins: Breeders' Cup Filly & Mare Sprint (2022, 2023)

Awards
- American Champion Female Sprint Horse (2022, 2023)

Goodnight Olive (foaled April 30, 2018) is a retired champion American Thoroughbred racehorse who won consecutive runnings of the Breeders' Cup Filly & Mare Sprint in 2022 and 2023. She was named the 2022 and 2023 US Champion Female Sprint Horse.

== Background ==
Goodnight Olive is a dark bay or brown mare who was bred in Kentucky by Stonestreet Thoroughbred Holdings and Clearsky Farms and was a $170,000 purchase at the 2019 October Keeneland sale by Steve Laymon's First Row Partners. Goodnight Olive is by 2004 Horse of the Year Ghostzapper. She is the third foal out of the Smart Strike mare Salty Strike, who won the Grade II Dogwood Stakes in 2011 and the Grade III Gardenia Stakes in 2012 along with numerous other listed and black-type stakes races.

Goodnight Olive is trained by Eclipse Award-winning trainer Chad Brown.

== Racing career ==
=== 2021: three-year-old season ===
Goodnight Olive broke her maiden at Keeneland in her second career start off of a layoff of seven months. She then defeated allowance company at Aqueduct Racetrack in her final start of the year.

=== 2022: four-year-old season ===
In 2022, Goodnight Olive was undefeated in four starts. Coming off of a layoff of seven months, she won allowance/optional claiming sprints at Belmont Park and Saratoga Race Course before being entered into the Grade I Ballerina Stakes, which she won by 2 3/4 lengths at odds of 5-1 under the lowest weight of 118 pounds. She was then rested until the Breeders' Cup Filly & Mare Sprint, which she won en route to honors as American Champion Female Sprinter.

=== 2023: five-year-old season ===
In 2023, Goodnight Olive resumed her career with a win in the Grade I Madison Stakes at Keeneland, her seventh career win and third straight Grade I victory. Staying at the 7-furlong distance, she placed in the Derby City Distaff Stakes at Churchill Downs, won the Bed O' Roses Stakes at Belmont, and finished second in the Ballerina Stakes behind Echo Zulu.

Goodnight Olive successfully defended her title in the Breeders' Cup Filly & Mare Sprint at Santa Anita Park as the favorite, winning by 2 3/4 lengths in what was thought to be her final career start.

Three days after her repeat win at the Breeders' Cup, Goodnight Olive went to the auction ring at the Fasig-Tipton November Sale as a broodmare and racing prospect. She was sold for $6 million, with the winning ticket signed by Gavin O'Connor for Resolute Bloodstock owner John Stewart. Stewart said after the purchase that he intended to keep Goodnight Olive in training for a 2024 campaign. He added that he knew there was foreign interest in the horse, and there was no price to keeping her in the United States.

After a successful campaign in 2023, Goodnight Olive was awarded an Eclipse Award as the U.S. Champion Female Sprint Horse for the second time.

== Retirement ==
Following the 2023 Breeders' Cup, Goodnight Olive returned to Chad Brown's barn at Payson Park in preparation for a 2024 campaign. However, on February 6, 2024, Resolute Farm announced in a press release that Goodnight Olive had been retired from racing and would be bred to Not This Time, the sire of 2022 champion 3-year-old Epicenter. Gavin O'Connor said that while they had hoped to continue her racing career, "unless Chad and his team thought she could continue to compete at (the highest) level, we always knew this was a likely path for her. She really doesn’t have anything else to prove."

== Statistics ==
| Date | Distance | Race | Grade | Track | Odds | Field | Finish | Winning Time | Winning (Losing) Margin | Jockey | Ref |
|---|---|---|---|---|---|---|---|---|---|---|---|
2021 – Three-year-old season
| Mar 7, 2021 | 6 furlongs | Maiden Special Weight | | Gulfstream Park | 2.20 | 11 | 2 | 1:10.51 | (1 3/4 lengths) | Irad Ortiz Jr. | |
| Oct 21, 2021 | 6 furlongs | Maiden Special Weight | | Keeneland | 0.40 | 10 | 1 | 1:09.85 | 8 1/2 lengths | Tyler Gaffalione | |
| Nov 21, 2021 | 7 furlongs | Allowance | | Aqueduct | 0.30* | 9 | 1 | 1:24.48 | 9 lengths | Irad Ortiz Jr. | |
2022 – Four-year-old season
| Jun 23, 2022 | 7 furlongs | Allowance Optional Claiming | | Belmont Park | 0.20* | 6 | 1 | 1:23.52 | 5 1/2 lengths | Irad Ortiz Jr. | |
| Aug 7, 2022 | 6 1/2 furlongs | Allowance Optional Claiming | | Saratoga | 0.35* | 6 | 1 | 1:17.24 | 3 3/4 lengths | Irad Ortiz Jr. | |
| Aug 28, 2022 | 7 furlongs | Ballerina Handicap | I | Saratoga | 5.80 | 7 | 1 | 1:21.40 | 2 3/4 lengths | Irad Ortiz Jr. | |
| Nov 5, 2022 | 7 furlongs | Breeders' Cup Filly & Mare Sprint | I | Keeneland | 1.85* | 12 | 1 | 1:21.61 | 2 1/2 lengths | Irad Ortiz Jr. | |
2023 – Five-year-old season
| Apr 8, 2023 | 7 furlongs | Madison Stakes | I | Keeneland | 0.37* | 5 | 1 | 1:23.12 | 1 length | Irad Ortiz Jr. | |
| May 6, 2023 | 7 furlongs | Derby City Distaff Stakes | I | Churchill Downs | 0.57* | 6 | 3 | 1:21.87 | (2 lengths) | Irad Ortiz Jr. | |
| Jun 17, 2023 | 7 furlongs | Bed O' Roses Stakes | II | Belmont Park | 0.30* | 5 | 1 | 1:22.39 | neck | Irad Ortiz Jr. | |
| Aug 26, 2023 | 7 furlongs | Ballerina Handicap | I | Saratoga | 2.20 | 7 | 2 | 1:20.95 | (2 1/2 lengths) | Irad Ortiz Jr. | |
| Nov 4, 2023 | 7 furlongs | Breeders' Cup Filly & Mare Sprint | I | Santa Anita | 1.10* | 9 | 1 | 1:22.97 | 2 3/4 lengths | Irad Ortiz Jr. | |

Notes:
An (*) asterisk after the odds means Goodnight Olive was the post-time favourite.

== Pedigree ==
Pedigree of Goodnight Olive, mare, April 30, 2018
| Sire Ghostzapper (2000) | Awesome Again (1994) | Deputy Minister (CAN) (1979) | Vice Regent (CAN) (1967) |
| Sire Ghostzapper (2000) | Awesome Again (1994) | Deputy Minister (CAN) (1979) | Mint Copy (CAN) (1970) |
| Sire Ghostzapper (2000) | Awesome Again (1994) | Primal Force (1987) | Blushing Groom (FR) (1974) |
| Sire Ghostzapper (2000) | Awesome Again (1994) | Primal Force (1987) | Prime Prospect (1978) |
| Sire Ghostzapper (2000) | Baby Zip (1990) | Relaunch (1976) | In Reality (1964) |
| Sire Ghostzapper (2000) | Baby Zip (1990) | Relaunch (1976) | Foggy Note (1965) |
| Sire Ghostzapper (2000) | Baby Zip (1990) | Thirty Zip (1983) | Tri Jet (1969) |
| Sire Ghostzapper (2000) | Baby Zip (1990) | Thirty Zip (1983) | Saliaway (1976) |
| Dam Salty Strike (2012) | Smart Strike (1992) | Mr. Prospector (1970) | Raise a Native (CAN) (1961) |
| Dam Salty Strike (2012) | Smart Strike (1992) | Mr. Prospector (1970) | Gold Digger (1962) |
| Dam Salty Strike (2012) | Smart Strike (1992) | Classy 'n Smart (CAN) (1981) | Smarten (1976) |
| Dam Salty Strike (2012) | Smart Strike (1992) | Classy 'n Smart (CAN) (1981) | No Class (CAN) (1974) |
| Dam Salty Strike (2012) | Lake Huron (1995) | Salt Lake (1989) | Deputy Minister (CAN) (1979) |
| Dam Salty Strike (2012) | Lake Huron (1995) | Salt Lake (1989) | Take Lady Anne (1979) |
| Dam Salty Strike (2012) | Lake Huron (1995) | My Rainbow (1987) | Lyphard (1969) |
| Dam Salty Strike (2012) | Lake Huron (1995) | My Rainbow (1987) | Muriesk (1979) (family 2d) |
