= Ambassador of Luck =

American-bred Thoroughbred racehorse

- Sire: What Luck
- Grandsire: Bold Ruler
- Dam: Detente
- Damsire: Dark Ruler
- Sex: Mare
- Foaled: 1979
- Country: United States
- Colour: Bay
- Breeder: C. Thomas Fuller
- Owner: Richard Ransom; Envoy Stable (Richard Ransom & Stephen D. Peskoff)
- Trainer: 1) William Carelli (1981); 2) Flint S. Schulhofer (1982); 3) Mitchell C. Preger (1983)
- Record: 23: 14-4-3
- Earnings: US$489,583

Major wins
- Martha Washington Stakes (1982); Duchess Stakes (1982); Molly Pitcher Handicap (1983); Maskette Stakes (1983); Ballerina Stakes (1983)

Awards
- American Champion Older Female Horse (1983)

Ambassador of Luck (1979–1994) was an American Thoroughbred racehorse who was voted the 1983 American Champion Older Female Horse. In her Championship season, she broke the stakes record in winning the Molly Pitcher Handicap at Monmouth Park Racetrack and equalled the stakes record when she won the Ballerina Stakes at Saratoga Race Course.

When her racing career was over Ambassador of Luck served as a broodmare, producing eight foals. One of her colts, Alydavid, sold as a weanling for $400,000. Ambassador of Luck died on February 9, 1994, as a result of foaling complications.
