= Dubai Majesty =

Thoroughbred racehorse

- Sire: Essence of Dubai
- Grandsire: Pulpit
- Dam: Great Majesty
- Damsire: Great Above
- Sex: Mare
- Foaled: 2005
- Country: United States
- Colour: Dark Bay
- Breeder: Harold J. Plumley
- Owner: Martin Racing Stable LLC (William & Stephanie Martin) & Dan Morgan
- Trainer: W. Bret Calhoun
- Record: 34: 12-7-6
- Earnings: US$1,509,643

Major wins
- Franklin County Stakes (2009); Winning Colors Stakes (2009, 2010); Incredible Revenge Stakes (2010); Thoroughbred Club of America Stakes (2010) Breeders' Cup wins: Breeders' Cup Filly & Mare Sprint (2010)

Awards
- American Champion Female Sprint Horse (2010)

Dubai Majesty (foaled March 19, 2005) is a retired Champion racemare best known for winning the 2010 Breeders' Cup Filly & Mare Sprint and being the only two-time winner of the Winning Colors Stakes.

== Background ==
Dubai Majesty is a dark bay nearly black mare sired by Essence of Dubai, whose sire was Pulpit. Her dam Great Majesty's descendants include U. S. Racing Hall of Fame inductee Ta Wee.

== Racing career ==
=== 2-3-year-old-season ===
Dubai Majesty only had 1 victory as a two-year-old, but as a 3-year-old she began to run in stakes race company starting with a second-place finish in the Azalea Stakes at Florida's Calder Race Course. She then ran third in the Raven Run Stakes at Keeneland as well as in the Indiana Oaks at Hoosier Park.

=== 4-year-old-season ===
After a second-place finish, Dubai Majesty won the Franklin County Stakes at Keeneland start the 2009 season. Trainer Bret Calhoun them moved her up to G1 stakes races and she finished fourth in the Vinery Madison Stakes and third place in the Humana Distaff Handicap. After that, she got the first of her two victorys in the Winning Colors Stakes. Winning once in her next four starts, Dubai Majesty's four-year-old season was over.

=== 5-year-old season ===
After four straight defeats, Dubai Majesty went on to repeat in the Winning Colors Stakes before a third-place result in the Princess Rooney Handicap. She then won a non-graded stakes race and followed that with a second in the G3 Presque Isle Downs Masters Stakes. Her last two races would be her best wins as she won the 2010 Raven Run Stakes. In her last start before being retired Dubai Majesty won the Breeders' Cup Filly & Mare Sprint, held that year on November 5 at Churchill Downs. Two days later she was sold at the Fasig-Tipton stock sale by Shunsuke Yoshida of Northern Farm for $1.1 million.

== Stud Career ==
As of 2023, Dubai Majesty has foaled 10 crops. Of these, her most successful progeny is Shahryar by Deep Impact, who won the Japanese Derby in 2021 as well as the Dubai Sheema Classic in 2022. Another of her sons, Al Ain, who is also a full brother of Shahryar, also won the Satsuki Sho in 2017 and the Osaka Hai in 2019.

== Pedigree ==
Pedigree of Justify, chestnut colt, March 28, 2015
Sire Essence of Dubai	Pulpit	A. P. Indy	Seattle Slew
Sire Essence of Dubai	Pulpit	A. P. Indy	Weekend Surprise
Sire Essence of Dubai	Pulpit	Preach	Mr. Prospector
Sire Essence of Dubai	Pulpit	Preach	Narrate
Sire Essence of Dubai	Epitome	Summing	Verbatim
Sire Essence of Dubai	Epitome	Summing	Sumatra
Sire Essence of Dubai	Epitome	Honest and True	Mr. Leader
Sire Essence of Dubai	Epitome	Honest and True	Teel Meno Lies
Dam Great Majesty	Great Above	Minnesota Mac	Rough'n Tumble
Dam Great Majesty	Great Above	Minnesota Mac	Cow Girl
Dam Great Majesty	Great Above	Ta Wee	Intentionally
Dam Great Majesty	Great Above	Ta Wee	Aspidistra
Dam Great Majesty	Mistic Majesty	His Majesty	Ribot
Dam Great Majesty	Mistic Majesty	His Majesty	Flower Bowl
Dam Great Majesty	Mistic Majesty	Necara's Miss	Ambernash
Dam Great Majesty	Mistic Majesty	Necara's Miss	Saracen Miss (family: 2-s)
