= Echo Zulu =

American-bred Thoroughbred racehorse

- Sire: Gun Runner
- Grandsire: Candy Ride
- Dam: Letgomyecho
- Damsire: Menifee
- Sex: Filly
- Foaled: April 7, 2019
- Died: February 18, 2024
- Country: United States
- Color: Bay
- Breeder: Betz, J. Betz, Burns, CHNNHK, Magers, CoCo Equine & Ramsby
- Owner: L and N Racing, Winchell Thoroughbreds
- Trainer: Steve Asmussen
- Record: 11: 9-1-0
- Earnings: $2,640,375

Major wins
- Spinaway Stakes (2021); Frizette Stakes (2021); Fair Grounds Oaks (2022); Dogwood Stakes (2022); Winning Colors Stakes (2023); Honorable Miss Handicap (2023); Ballerina Handicap (2023); Breeders' Cup wins: Breeders' Cup Juvenile Fillies (2021)

Awards
- American Champion Two-Year-Old Filly (2021)

Echo Zulu (April 7, 2019 – February 18, 2024) was a champion American Thoroughbred racehorse who won the 2021 Breeders' Cup Juvenile Fillies and 2022 Fair Grounds Oaks, and was named the 2021 Champion Two-Year-Old Filly.

== Background ==
Echo Zulu was a bay filly who was bred in Kentucky by Betz, J. Betz, Burns, CHNNHK, Magers, CoCo Equine, and Ramsby. She was from the first crop of her sire Gun Runner, who was the 2017 American Horse of the Year and winner of the 2017 Breeders' Cup Classic. Echo Zulu was the eleventh foal of racing age out of the stakes-winning mare Letgomyecho, who had previously produced Grade 1 winner Echo Town. She was sold at the 2020 Keeneland Yearling Sale for $300,000 to Winchell Thoroughbreds (which had owned Gun Runner during his racing career) and L and N Racing, which consisted of Lee Levinson, his sons Andy and Michael, and friend Don Nelson. She is trained by Steve Asmussen, who had also trained Gun Runner.

== Racing career ==
=== 2021: Two-year-old season ===
Echo Zulu made her first start on July 15, 2021, in a maiden special weight race at Saratoga Racecourse. She pressed a fast early pace set by Lady Scarlet, then took the lead at the top of the stretch. She continued to draw away to win by 5 1/2 lengths. She was named a TDN Rising Star by Thoroughbred Daily News.

In her second race, Echo Zulu stepped sharply up in class for the Grade 1 Spinaway Stakes on September 5 at Saratoga. She broke poorly but quickly went to the lead, running the opening quarter-mile in 22.07 seconds and the half in 44.73. She started to draw away turning into the stretch and won by 4 1/2 lengths, becoming the first Grade 1 winner for Gun Runner.

On October 3, Echo Zulu maintained her undefeated record in the Frizette Stakes at Belmont Park. She took the early lead while setting moderately fast fractions, then pulled away in the stretch to win by seven lengths. Asmussen said that he had been worried. "I watched the race from up the stretch, a long ways across to the backside — (and they went) :22 and 1, :45 and change," he said. "But the first thing (jockey Ricardo Santana Jr.) said when he came back was that he couldn't believe how relaxed she was. He said her ears were up and she was relaxed and within herself."

Echo Zulu shipped to California for her final start of the season in the Breeders' Cup Juvenile Fillies on November 5 at Del Mar Racetrack. Asmussen decided to change jockeys to Joel Rosario but the tactics remained the same. Echo Zulu went to the early lead and set moderate fractions, then responded to a brief challenge by pulling away down the stretch to win by 4 1/2 lengths. "She is amazing", said Rosario. "Today she liked what she was doing up there (in the lead) and when I asked her, she just took off."

=== 2022: Three-year-old season ===
Echo Zulu was stabled at Fair Grounds Racecourse to prepare for her 2022 campaign. Her trainer Asmussen had two previous Kentucky Oaks winners Summerly and Untappable also wintered at Fair Grounds.

She made her first start as a three-year-old in the Grade II Fair Grounds Oaks which she won by a nose over Hidden Connection. Starting as the very short 1/10 odds-on favorite Echo Zulu bounced out in front and led by a length through the race and barely held on to game Hidden Connection who tried to overtake her on the line.

The 2022 Kentucky Oaks, held on May 6, attracted 'arguably the best field ever' for the race according to The Thoroughbred Daily News'. In addition to Secret Oath, the field featured Nest (Ashland Stakes), two-year-old champion Echo Zulu, Kathleen O (Gulfstream Park Oaks), with several well-regarded longshots like Nostalgic (Gazelle Stakes) and Desert Dawn (Santa Anita Oaks). Breaking from post position seven, Echo Zulu pressed on the outside of early leader Yuugirl. In the straight Echo Zulu was in the three path into the lane, made a bid down the lane but weakened late in the drive finishing three lengths behind winner Secret Oath. After her defeat connections including trainer Steve Asmussen and David Fiske, racing manager for Winchell Thoroughbreds indicated that Echo Zulu would be pointed to the one-turn mile Grade I Acorn Stakes Belmont Park and would point to sprint races.

Echo Zulu was entered to run in the Grade I Acorn Stakes on 11 June but was scratched at the starting gate on veterinarian advice. She was rested until September and returned in the 7-furlong Dogwood Stakes at Churchill Downs against four other fillies, which she won on the lead by 5 1/4 lengths.

Echo Zulu was then sent to that year's Breeders' Cup Filly & Mare Sprint at Keeneland. Racing off the pace, she circled the field six wide on the final turn and was second best behind the Chad Brown-trained Goodnight Olive.

=== 2023: Four-year-old season ===
After an extended layoff, on May 29 Echo Zulu returned to face four other fillies in the Grade III Winning Colors Stakes at Churchill Downs over six furlongs. Echo Zulu lead quickly from the gate running the opening quarter under a loose hold from Florent Geroux in :21.75 while Fire On Time pressed the pace in second. At the top of the stretch in :44.62, Martin Garcia urged Fire On Time to put a neck in front but the small lead disappeared quickly when Echo Zulu forged ahead away down the lane in :56.41. Echo Zulu finished the event 5 3/4 lengths in front for a final time of 1:08.99.

Echo Zulu was then shipped to Saratoga for the first time since her two-year-old season to compete in graded sprint races for females. She easily defeated three others by 7 1/4 lengths in the July 26 Honorable Miss at 6 furlongs. The following month, in what would turn out to be her final race, Echo Zulu contested the 7-furlong Ballerina Handicap against the 2022 Breeders' Cup Filly & Mare Sprint winner Goodnight Olive. Echo Zulu took the lead from the start and repelled the challenge of the Breeders' Cup champion, winning the Ballerina by 2 1/2 lengths.

== Injury and death ==
Echo Zulu's win in the Ballerina gave her an automatic entry into that year's Breeders' Cup Filly and Mare Sprint at Santa Anita. In October 2023, while preparing for the Breeders' Cup, she suffered a sesamoid fracture of her left front fetlock. She underwent successful surgery, and recuperated at the Chino Valley Equine Hospital in Chino Hills, California.

Echo Zulu was euthanized on February 18, 2024, after an accident in her stall resulted in a leg injury. Steve Asmussen announced her death the following day, saying that she had become cast in her stall and was injured when she attempted to rise to her feet.

== Statistics ==
Date	Distance	Race	Grade	Track	Odds	Field	Finish	Winning Time	Winning (Losing) Margin	Jockey	Ref
2021 – Two-year-old season
Jul 15, 2021	5 1/2 furlongs	Maiden Special Weight		Saratoga	4.10	9	1	1:04.69	5 1/2 lengths	Ricardo Santana Jr.	
Sep 5, 2021	7 furlongs	Spinaway Stakes	I	Saratoga	0.65*	9	1	1:22.51	4 lengths	Ricardo Santana Jr.	
Oct 3, 2021	1 mile	Frizette Stakes	I	Belmont Park	0.35*	9	1	1:35.12	7 1/4 lengths	Ricardo Santana Jr.	
Nov 5, 2021	1 1/16 miles	Breeders' Cup Juvenile Fillies	I	Del Mar	0.80*	6	1	1:42.24	5 1/4 lengths	Joel Rosario	
2022 – Three-year-old season
Mar 26, 2022	1 1/16 miles	Fair Grounds Oaks	II	Fair Grounds	0.10*	6	1	1:42.69	nose	Joel Rosario	
May 6, 2022	1 1/8 miles	Kentucky Oaks	I	Churchill Downs	4.00	14	4	1:49.44	(3 lengths)	Joel Rosario	
Sep 24, 2022	7 furlongs	Dogwood Stakes	III	Churchill Downs	0.51*	5	1	1:22.43	5 1/4 lengths	Ricardo Santana Jr.	
Nov 5, 2022	7 furlongs	Breeders' Cup Filly & Mare Sprint	I	Keeneland	3.63	12	2	1:21.61	(2 1/2 lengths)	Ricardo Santana Jr.	
2023 – Four-year-old season
May 29, 2023	6 furlongs	Winning Colors Stakes	III	Churchill Downs	0.31*	5	1	1:08.99	5 3/4 lengths	Florent Geroux	
Jul 26, 2023	6 furlongs	Honorable Miss Handicap	II	Saratoga	0.40*	4	1	1:08.76	7 1/4 lengths	Florent Geroux	
Aug 26, 2023	7 furlongs	Ballerina Handicap	I	Saratoga	0.60*	7	1	1:20.95	2 1/2 lengths	Florent Geroux	

Notes:
An (*) asterisk after the odds means Echo Zulu was the post-time favourite.

== Pedigree ==
Pedigree of Echo Zulu (bay filly, April 7, 2019)
Sire Gun Runner 2013	Candy Ride (ARG)	Ride the Rails	Cryptoclearance
Sire Gun Runner 2013	Candy Ride (ARG)	Ride the Rails	Herbalesian
Sire Gun Runner 2013	Candy Ride (ARG)	Candy Girl (ARG)	Candy Stripes
Sire Gun Runner 2013	Candy Ride (ARG)	Candy Girl (ARG)	City Girl (ARG)
Sire Gun Runner 2013	Quiet Giant	Giant's Causeway	Storm Cat
Sire Gun Runner 2013	Quiet Giant	Giant's Causeway	Mariah's Storm
Sire Gun Runner 2013	Quiet Giant	Quiet Dance	Quiet American
Sire Gun Runner 2013	Quiet Giant	Quiet Dance	Misty Dancer
Dam Letgomyecho 2002	Menifee	Harlan	Storm Cat
Dam Letgomyecho 2002	Menifee	Harlan	Country Romance (CAN)
Dam Letgomyecho 2002	Menifee	Anne Campbell	Never Bend
Dam Letgomyecho 2002	Menifee	Anne Campbell	Repercussion
Dam Letgomyecho 2002	Echo Echo Echo	Eastern Echo	Damascus
Dam Letgomyecho 2002	Echo Echo Echo	Eastern Echo	Wild Applause
Dam Letgomyecho 2002	Echo Echo Echo	Kashie West	Sir Ivor
Dam Letgomyecho 2002	Echo Echo Echo	Kashie West	Tatallah (family 16-g)

Echo Zulu is inbred 4s × 4d to Storm Cat.
