= Serengeti Empress =

- Serengeti Empress in retirement.
- Sire: Alternation
- Grandsire: Distorted Humor
- Dam: Havisham
- Damsire: Bernardini
- Sex: Mare
- Foaled: January 30, 2016
- Country: United States
- Color: Dark bay or brown
- Breeder: Tri Eques Bloodstock LLC
- Owner: Joel Politi
- Trainer: Tom Amoss
- Record: 19: 7–5–1
- Earnings: US$2,175,653

Major wins
- Ellis Park Debutante Stakes (2018); Pocahontas Stakes (2018); Rachel Alexandra Stakes (2019); Kentucky Oaks (2019); Azeri Stakes (2020); Ballerina Stakes (2020)
- Last updated on September 10, 2026

Serengeti Empress (foaled January 30, 2016) is an American Thoroughbred racehorse and broodmare best known for winning the 2019 Kentucky Oaks and 2020 Ballerina Stakes. Trained throughout her racing career by Tom Amoss for owner Joel Politi, she won seven of 19 starts and earned US$2,175,653. Her other major victories included the Pocahontas Stakes, Rachel Alexandra Stakes, and Azeri Stakes. She also placed in the Acorn Stakes, Test Stakes, Breeders' Cup Distaff, and Breeders' Cup Filly & Mare Sprint.

== Pedigree and training ==
Serengeti Empress was bred in Kentucky by Tri Eques Bloodstock LLC, a partnership that included Jacob West, Mike Hartig, and Val Henson. She was sired by Alternation, a son of Distorted Humor who won the Peter Pan Stakes, Oaklawn Handicap, Razorback Handicap, and Pimlico Special. Her dam, Havisham, was an unraced daughter of Bernardini.

Serengeti Empress was sold for $25,000 as a weanling at the 2016 Keeneland November Breeding Stock Sale. She returned to Keeneland the following year, where Amoss purchased her for $70,000 at the 2017 September Yearling Sale on behalf of Politi.

Amoss later said that he was attracted to the filly's shoulder and hindquarters despite Alternation's relatively modest commercial status at the time. He also described Serengeti Empress as an intelligent horse who adapted quickly to successive stages of training.

== Racing career ==
=== 2018: two-year-old season ===
Serengeti Empress made her racing debut at Indiana Grand on July 4, 2018, winning a maiden special weight race by 5 1/2 lengths. She subsequently finished fourth in the Schuylerville Stakes at Saratoga Race Course. She returned to win the Ellis Park Debutante Stakes by 13 1/2 lengths.

In September she contested the Grade 2 Pocahontas Stakes at Churchill Downs. Racing on the lead, Serengeti Empress drew away to win by 19 1/2 lengths. She concluded her juvenile season by finishing seventh in the Breeders' Cup Juvenile Fillies.

=== 2019: three-year-old season ===
Serengeti Empress began her three-year-old season in the Grade 2 Rachel Alexandra Stakes at Fair Grounds Race Course, where she led throughout and won by 4 1/2 lengths. She was favored for the Grade 2 Fair Grounds Oaks on March 23, but bled during the race and was eased before being taken from the track by horse ambulance.

Following the Fair Grounds Oaks, Amoss monitored the filly's recovery before deciding whether to proceed to the Kentucky Oaks. A series of workouts at Churchill Downs, including a five-furlong workout in 58.20 seconds on April 23, persuaded her connections to enter the race.

In the Kentucky Oaks on May 3, Serengeti Empress started at odds of 13–1 under jockey José Ortiz. Breaking from post 13, she went to the lead soon after the start and remained in front throughout the 1 1/8-mile (1.8 km) race. She defeated Liora by 1 3/4 lengths in 1:50.17, giving both Amoss and Ortiz their first Kentucky Oaks victories.

In June, Serengeti Empress finished second to Guarana in the Grade 1 Acorn Stakes after setting fractions of 21.89 seconds for the opening quarter-mile and 43.99 for the half-mile. She was again second in August in the Grade 1 Test Stakes, losing to Covfefe by half a length. After finishing sixth in the Cotillion Stakes, she faced older fillies and mares for the first time in the Breeders' Cup Distaff, where she finished third behind Blue Prize and Midnight Bisou.

=== 2020: four-year-old season ===
Serengeti Empress opened her four-year-old campaign with a second-place finish in the Grade 3 Houston Ladies Classic Stakes. On March 14 she won the Grade 2 Azeri Stakes at Oaklawn Park by 6 1/4 lengths.

After two subsequent losses in route races, Amoss shortened her to seven furlongs for the Grade 1 Ballerina Stakes at Saratoga on August 8. Ridden by Luis Sáez, Serengeti Empress moved to the lead soon after the start and defeated Bellafina by one length in 1:21.63. The victory earned her an automatic spot in the Breeders' Cup Filly & Mare Sprint.

In September, she finished second by a nose to Bell's the One in the Grade 1 Derby City Distaff Stakes at Churchill Downs. She made her final start in the Breeders' Cup Filly & Mare Sprint at Keeneland on November 7. Serengeti Empress led early before being overtaken by Gamine and finished second.

Serengeti Empress was retired following the Breeders' Cup with seven wins, five second-place finishes, and one third from 19 starts. Her earnings totaled $2,175,653.

== Breeding career ==
Following her retirement, Serengeti Empress returned to Taylor Made Farm in Kentucky, where she had been raised. Politi retained her as a broodmare rather than offering her at public auction. Her first mating was with Into Mischief.

Her first foal, a colt by Into Mischief named Invictus, was born in 2022. Invictus was offered at the 2023 Keeneland September Yearling Sale and sold for $1.2 million. He entered training with Brad H. Cox and became Serengeti Empress's first winner when he won a seven-furlong maiden special weight at Keeneland on April 8, 2025.

Serengeti Empress subsequently produced Kilimanjaro, a dark bay colt by Curlin, on January 23, 2024. She produced a third colt, by Not This Time, in 2025. As of February 2026, Politi reported that Serengeti Empress had three foals, all colts, and was barren for the 2026 foaling season. She was scheduled to be bred to Gun Runner in 2026.

== Pedigree ==
Serengeti Empress is by Alternation, whose sire Distorted Humor was a leading American stallion and the sire of Funny Cide. Her dam, Havisham, is by Bernardini, winner of the Preakness Stakes, Travers Stakes, and Jockey Club Gold Cup. Havisham's dam, Love Dancing, was a Group 3 winner in Argentina and was third in the UAE Oaks.

Through Alternation's female family and Bernardini's sire A.P. Indy, Serengeti Empress is inbred 3 × 4 to Seattle Slew.

Pedigree of Serengeti Empress (USA) dark bay/brown mare, (2016)
Sire Alternation (USA) 2008	Distorted Humor (USA); 1993	Forty Niner (USA); 1985	Mr. Prospector (USA)
Sire Alternation (USA) 2008	Distorted Humor (USA); 1993	Forty Niner (USA); 1985	File (USA)
Sire Alternation (USA) 2008	Distorted Humor (USA); 1993	Danzig's Beauty (USA); 1987	Danzig (USA)
Sire Alternation (USA) 2008	Distorted Humor (USA); 1993	Danzig's Beauty (USA); 1987	Sweetest Chant (USA)
Sire Alternation (USA) 2008	Alternate (USA); 1999	Seattle Slew* (USA); 1974	Bold Reasoning (USA)
Sire Alternation (USA) 2008	Alternate (USA); 1999	Seattle Slew* (USA); 1974	My Charmer (USA)
Sire Alternation (USA) 2008	Alternate (USA); 1999	Strike a Balance (USA); 1983	Green Dancer (USA)
Sire Alternation (USA) 2008	Alternate (USA); 1999	Strike a Balance (USA); 1983	Strike a Pose (USA)
Dam Havisham (USA) 2012	Bernardini (USA); 2003	A.P. Indy (USA); 1989	Seattle Slew* (USA)
Dam Havisham (USA) 2012	Bernardini (USA); 2003	A.P. Indy (USA); 1989	Weekend Surprise (USA)
Dam Havisham (USA) 2012	Bernardini (USA); 2003	Cara Rafaela (USA); 1993	Quiet American (USA)
Dam Havisham (USA) 2012	Bernardini (USA); 2003	Cara Rafaela (USA); 1993	Oil Fable (USA)
Dam Havisham (USA) 2012	Love Dancing (ARG); 2004	Salt Lake (USA); 1989	Deputy Minister (CAN)
Dam Havisham (USA) 2012	Love Dancing (ARG); 2004	Salt Lake (USA); 1989	Take Lady Anne (USA)
Dam Havisham (USA) 2012	Love Dancing (ARG); 2004	Le Midi (ARG); 1989	Fitzcarraldo (ARG)
Dam Havisham (USA) 2012	Love Dancing (ARG); 2004	Le Midi (ARG); 1989	La Tempestad (ARG) (Family: 16-e)
