= Gamine (horse) =

American thoroughbred racehorse

- Sire: Into Mischief
- Grandsire: Harlan's Holiday
- Dam: Peggy Jane
- Damsire: Kafwain
- Sex: Mare
- Foaled: 2017
- Country: United States
- Color: Bay
- Breeder: Grace Thoroughbred Holdings LLC
- Owner: Michael Lund Petersen
- Trainer: Bob Baffert
- Record: 11:9-0-1
- Earnings: $1,771,500

Major wins
- Acorn Stakes (2020); Test Stakes (2020); Las Flores Stakes (2021); Derby City Distaff Stakes (2021); Great Lady M. Stakes (2021); Ballerina Handicap (2021) Breeders' Cup wins: Breeders' Cup Filly & Mare Sprint (2020)

Awards
- American Champion Female Sprint Horse (2020)
- Last updated on 7 November 2021

Gamine (foaled February 16, 2017) is a multiple graded stakes-winning American Thoroughbred racehorse. She has won nine races from eleven career starts, including the 2020 Breeders' Cup Filly & Mare Sprint and four other Grade One events. She was named 2020's champion female sprinter.

== Background ==
Gamine is the daughter of 2007 Los Alamitos Futurity champion, Into Mischief and non-stakes winner, Peggy Jane. She was purchased as a yearling for $220,000 in 2018. The following year she was sold for $1,800,000 at the Fasig-Tipton Midlantic 2-Year Olds sale.

== Racing career ==
=== 2020: Three-year-old season ===
Gamine made her debut as a three-year-old on March 7 at Santa Anita Park in a Maiden race. She won this race by going straight to the front and winning by 6 1/4 lengths.

Her next race was an Allowance Optional Claiming on May 2 at Oaklawn Park. As in her last start, she went straight to the front. At the end of the race, she slowed down but won by a neck. Shortly after the race, Gamine tested positive for lidocaine. The Arkansas Derby (Div. 1) winner Charlatan also tested positive.

Bob Baffert said in a statement that he believes both horses were "unknowingly and innocently" exposed to lidocaine by one of his stable employees. The employee had broken his pelvis and was suffering from back pain in the days leading up to May 2. He applied a pain-relieving patch, which contained small amounts of lidocaine, according to Baffert's statement.

Gamine ran next in the Acorn Stakes on June 20 at Belmont Park. She ran fast fractions right from the start and opened up in the stretch to win by 18 3/4 lengths. She broke You's race record by 1.55 seconds and was 0.31 seconds slower than the track record. After the Acorn, Gamine became the favorite for the Kentucky Oaks and got 50 points for the 2020 Road to the Kentucky Oaks.

She was then taken to Saratoga for the Test Stakes on August 8. She won by 7 lengths and again set a stakes record.

On September 4, Gamine started at Churchill Downs in the Kentucky Oaks, where she met Alabama Stakes winner Swiss Skydiver, who was the 2nd favorite after Gamine. Again Gamine went to the front but slowed down in the stretch and was overtaken by long shot Shedaresthedevil and Swiss Skydiver. Gamine finished third. After the Kentucky Oaks, Gamine tested positive again, this time for betamethasone.

"The medication was administered to Gamine on August 17 by her veterinarian and on the veterinarian's recommendation. Importantly, the veterinarian followed established medical and regulatory guidelines in administering the medication, The withdrawal guidelines published by the Kentucky Horse Racing Commission recommend that the medication not be given within 14 days of a race. In this instance, as an additional layer of protection, Gamine's veterinarian last treated her with betamethasone 18 days before the Oaks."

Gamine was disqualified to last place.

Gamine's next start came in the Breeders' Cup Filly & Mare Sprint, which took place on November 7 at Keeneland. Her opponents included Serengeti Empress and Bell's the One. Serengeti Empress went to the front with Gamine stalking. They ran fractions of 21.77 and 44.27 through the half mile.

In the stretch, Gamine overtook Serengeti Empress to win by 6 1/4 lengths in a time of 1:20.20, which broke the stakes record and the track record.

Gamine was named American Champion Female Sprint Horse for 2020.

In the 2020 World's Best Racehorse Rankings, Gamine was rated 122, making her the equal twenty-first best racehorse in the world and the best three-year-old filly alongside Love and Swiss Skydiver.

=== 2021: Four-year-old season ===
On April 4, Gamine made her first start at age 4. She ran in the Las Flores Stakes in Santa Anita Park in preparation for the Derby City Distaff Stakes at Churchill Downs. Gamine took the lead, running fractions of 22.74 and 45.77. With John R. Velazquez aboard, she won by 5 lengths in a time of 1:09.52.

After the race, her trainer Bob Baffert said she was one of the best one-turn mares he has ever trained.

On May 1, in the Derby City Distaff Stakes at Churchill Downs, she ran against Sconsin and Bell's the One. She got off to a slow start but soon took the lead and set fractions of 23.15 and 46.08. In the stretch, Sconsin made a run at Gamine, but she held on to win by 1 1/2 lengths. Her final time was 1:21:50 for 7 furlongs.

The next start was the Great Lady M. Stakes, in Los Alamitos, on July 5. Gamine took the lead from the start and set fractions of 21.61 and 44.32. She won by 10 lengths in a time of 1:14.98 for 6 1/2 furlongs.

After that, she was brought to Saratoga for the Ballerina Handicap against a strong field. Gamine got off to a good start and set fractions of 23.20, 45.68 and 1:09.20. In the end, she won by 1 3/4 lengths in a time of 1:21.39.

On November 6, Gamine was a hot 2/5 odds-on favorite in her attempt to repeat winning the Breeders' Cup Filly & Mare Sprint at Del Mar. In a five horse field Gamine started well leading through the first three furlongs but was collared on the turn and was soundly beaten into third place by Ce Ce.

== Racing record ==
Statistics
| Date | Race | Racecourse | Grade | Distance | Finish | Margin | Time | Weight | Odds | Jockey | Ref |
|---|---|---|---|---|---|---|---|---|---|---|---|
| Mar 7, 2020 | Maiden Special Weight | Santa Anita | | 6 1/2 furlongs | 1 | 6 1/4 lengths | 1:16.59 | 118 lbs | 0.10* | Drayden Van Dyke | |
| May 2, 2020 | Allowance | Oaklawn Park | | 1 1/16 miles | 1 | neck | 1:41.91 | 119 lbs | 0.60* | Martin Garcia | |
| Jun 20, 2020 | Acorn Stakes | Belmont Park | I | 1 mile | 1 | 18 3/4 lengths | 1:32.55‡ | 120 lbs | 0.70* | John R. Velazquez | |
| Aug 8, 2020 | Test Stakes | Saratoga | I | 7 furlongs | 1 | 7 lengths | 1:20.83‡ | 123 lbs | 0.30* | John R. Velazquez | |
| Sep 4, 2020 | Kentucky Oaks | Churchill Downs | I | 1 1/8 miles | 9† | (2 1/2 lengths) | 1:48.28 | 121 lbs | 0.70* | John R. Velazquez | |
| Nov 7, 2020 | Breeders' Cup Filly & Mare Sprint | Keeneland | I | 7 furlongs | 1 | 6 1/4 lengths | 1:20.20⊕ | 122 lbs | 1.10* | John R. Velazquez | |
| Apr 4, 2021 | Las Flores Stakes | Santa Anita | III | 6 furlongs | 1 | 5 lengths | 1:09.52 | 124 lbs | 0.05* | John R. Velazquez | |
| May 1, 2021 | Derby City Distaff Stakes | Churchill Downs | I | 7 furlongs | 1 | 1 1/2 lengths | 1:21.50 | 123 lbs | 0.20* | John R. Velazquez | |
| Jul 5, 2021 | Great Lady M. Stakes | Los Alamitos | II | 6 1/2 furlongs | 1 | 10 lengths | 1:14.98 | 124 lbs | 0.20* | John R. Velazquez | |
| Aug 28, 2021 | Ballerina Handicap | Saratoga | I | 7 furlongs | 1 | 1 3/4 lengths | 1:21.61 | 126 lbs | 0.35* | John R. Velazquez | |
| Nov 6, 2021 | Breeders' Cup Filly & Mare Sprint | Del Mar | I | 7 furlongs | 3 | (3 1/4 lengths) | 1:21.00 | 124 lbs | 0.40* | John R. Velazquez | |

Notes:
† Gamine finished third but was disqualified due to a medication violation
‡ Stakes record
⊕ Track Record

== Retirement ==
Gamine's retirement from racing was announced on January 4, 2022. She will reside at Hill 'n' Dale Farms at Xalapa in Paris, Kentucky.

Owner Michael Lund Petersen announced that Gamine would visit Quality Road who stands at Lane's End Farm for the 2022 breeding season.

== Pedigree ==
Pedigree of Gamine (USA), 2017
| Sire Into Mischief (USA) b. 2005 | Harlan's Holiday (USA) b. 1999 | Harlan | Storm Cat |
| Sire Into Mischief (USA) b. 2005 | Harlan's Holiday (USA) b. 1999 | Harlan | Country Romance |
| Sire Into Mischief (USA) b. 2005 | Harlan's Holiday (USA) b. 1999 | Christmas in Aiken | Affirmed |
| Sire Into Mischief (USA) b. 2005 | Harlan's Holiday (USA) b. 1999 | Christmas in Aiken | Dowager |
| Sire Into Mischief (USA) b. 2005 | Leslie's Lady (USA) b. 1996 | Tricky Creek | Clever Trick |
| Sire Into Mischief (USA) b. 2005 | Leslie's Lady (USA) b. 1996 | Tricky Creek | Battle Creek Girl |
| Sire Into Mischief (USA) b. 2005 | Leslie's Lady (USA) b. 1996 | Crystal Lady | Stop the Music |
| Sire Into Mischief (USA) b. 2005 | Leslie's Lady (USA) b. 1996 | Crystal Lady | One Last Bird |
| Dam Peggy Jane (USA) b. 2009 | Kafwain (USA) b. 2000 | Cherokee Run | Runaway Groom |
| Dam Peggy Jane (USA) b. 2009 | Kafwain (USA) b. 2000 | Cherokee Run | Cherokee Dame |
| Dam Peggy Jane (USA) b. 2009 | Kafwain (USA) b. 2000 | Swazi's Moment | Moment of Hope |
| Dam Peggy Jane (USA) b. 2009 | Kafwain (USA) b. 2000 | Swazi's Moment | Swazi Girl |
| Dam Peggy Jane (USA) b. 2009 | Seattle Splash (USA) b. 2003 | Chief Seattle | Seattle Slew |
| Dam Peggy Jane (USA) b. 2009 | Seattle Splash (USA) b. 2003 | Chief Seattle | Skatingonthinice |
| Dam Peggy Jane (USA) b. 2009 | Seattle Splash (USA) b. 2003 | Grand Splash | Bucksplasher |
| Dam Peggy Jane (USA) b. 2009 | Seattle Splash (USA) b. 2003 | Grand Splash | Rain a Little |
