= Maryfield (horse) =

Canadian-bred Thoroughbred racehorse

- Sire: Elusive Quality
- Grandsire: Gone West
- Dam: Sly Maid
- Damsire: Desert Wine
- Sex: Filly
- Foaled: 2001
- Country: Canada
- Colour: Bay
- Breeder: Mike Carroll & John C. Harvey, Jr.
- Owner: Mark Gorman, Nick Mestrandrea & Jim Perry
- Trainer: Doug O'Neill
- Record: 28 : 9-5-1
- Earnings: $1,334,331

Major wins
- Flower Girl Handicap (2006); Very Subtle Stakes (2006); Ballerina Stakes (2007); Distaff Handicap (2007) Breeders' Cup wins: Breeders' Cup Filly & Mare Sprint (2007)

Awards
- American Champion Female Sprint Horse (2007)

Honours
- Canadian Horse Racing Hall of Fame (2009)

Maryfield (foaled April 13, 2001 in Ontario) is a retired Hall of Fame and Champion Thoroughbred racehorse.

Trained by Doug O'Neill, she raced for her American owners in the United States. In 2007, Maryfield became only the fourth Canadian-bred horse to ever win a Breeders' Cup race when she captured the Filly & Mare Sprint, hosted that year by Monmouth Park Racetrack. She was voted the 2007 Eclipse Award for American Champion Female Sprint Horse and in 2009 was inducted in the Canadian Horse Racing Hall of Fame.
