= Dogwood Stakes =

- Class: Grade III
- Location: Churchill Downs; Louisville, Kentucky, USA
- Inaugurated: 1975
- Race type: Thoroughbred
- Website: www.churchilldowns.com

Race information
- Distance: 7 furlongs
- Surface: Dirt
- Track: Left-handed
- Qualification: three-year-old fillies
- Weight: 122 lbs. with allowances
- Purse: US$300,000 (2023)

The Dogwood Stakes is a Grade III American Thoroughbred horse race for three-year-old fillies run over a distance of seven furlongs on the dirt track annually in September at Churchill Downs racetrack in Louisville, Kentucky.

== History ==
The event was inaugurated on 8 June 1975 and was won by the favorite My Juliet who would later the following year win Eclipse Award for Outstanding Sprint Horse.

The event is named after a hardy, blooming tree known as the Dogwood, that adds so much beauty to the spring landscape in Kentucky.

The Dogwood Stakes was run in two divisions in 1981.

The event was upgraded to Grade III in 1998. However, the event lost this classification for the 2016 running and was a Listed event. The event regained its Grade III status in 2020. The 2019 winner Covfefe, would later win the Breeders' Cup Filly & Mare Sprint and become champion female sprinter and champion 3-year-old filly.

=== Distances ===
Since its inauguration in 1975, the race has been contested at a variety of distances:

- 7 furlongs : 1975–1981, 2013 to present
- 1 1/16 miles : 1982, 1986–2005
- 1 mile : 2006–2012
- 1 1/8 miles : 1983–1985

== Records ==
Speed records

- 7 furlongs: 1:22.27 – My Mane Squeeze (2024)
- 1 mile: 1:34.56 – Acoma (2008)
- 1 1/16 miles: 1:42.73 – Take Charge Lady (2002)

Margins:

- 8 lengths – Covfefe (2019)

Most wins by a jockey

- 4 – Larry Melancon (1982, 1984, 1994, 1996)
- 4 – Pat Day (1983, 1989, 1997, 1998)

Most wins by a trainer

- 5 – D. Wayne Lukas (1989, 1990, 1991, 1993, 2004)

Most wins by an owner

- 2 – Claiborne Farm (1983, 1992)
- 2 – Overbrook Farm (1989, 1990)
- 2 – John C. Oxley (1995, 2005)
- 2 – LNJ Foxwoods (2015, 2019)
- 2 – Winchell Thoroughbreds (2009, 2022)

== Winners ==
Year	Winner	Jockey	Trainer	Owner	Distance	Time	Purse	Grade	Ref
2026	Conceit	Mario Gutierrez	Brad H. Cox	Juddmonte	7 furlongs	1:22.60	$300,000	III	
2025	Ragtime	Junior Alvarado	William I. Mott	Godolphin Racing	7 furlongs	1:22.35	$300,000	III	
2024	My Mane Squeeze	Luis Saez	Michael J. Maker	William J. Butler & WinStar Farm	7 furlongs	1:22.27	$269,335	III	
2023	Lady Radler	Jesus Castanon	Michael Campbell	Mellon Patch	7 furlongs	1:22.71	$299,750	III	
2022	Echo Zulu	Ricardo Santana Jr.	Steven M. Asmussen	L and N Racing & Winchell Thoroughbreds	7 furlongs	1:22.43	$274,000	III	
2021	Carribean Caper	Colby Hernandez	Albert Stall Jr.	Columbine Stable	7 furlongs	1:22.57	$275,000	III	
2020	Four Graces	Julien R. Leparoux	Ian R. Wilkes	Whitham Thoroughbreds	7 furlongs	1:22.28	$100,000	III	
2019	Covfefe	Shaun Bridgmohan	Brad H. Cox	LNJ Foxwoods	7 furlongs	1:25.04	$125,000	Listed	
2018	Divine Queen	Calvin H. Borel	William B. Bradley	William B. Bradley & Carl Hurst	7 furlongs	1:23.27	$100,000	Listed	
2017	Pinch Hit	Jon Court	Brad H. Cox	Klein Racing	7 furlongs	1:23.29	$100,000	Listed	
2016	Mines and Magic	Robby Albarado	Victoria H. Oliver	G. Watts Humphrey Jr.	7 furlongs	1:23.02	$100,000	Listed	
2015	Super Majesty	Alex O. Solis	Jerry Hollendorfer	LNJ Foxwoods	7 furlongs	1:23.19	$100,000	III	
2014	Thank You Marylou	Miguel Mena	Michael J. Maker	Ken and Sarah Ramsey	7 furlongs	1:23.73	$112,000	III	
2013	Sky Girl	Corey J. Lanerie	William I. Mott	Alpha Delta Stables	7 furlongs	1:35.39	$110,000	III	
2012	Race not held								
2011	Salty Strike	Manoel R. Cruz	Kenneth G. McPeek	Craig B. Singer	1 mile	1:35.89	$109,300	III	
2010	Ailalea	Calvin H. Borel	Todd A. Pletcher	Starlight Partners	1 mile	1:35.78	$110,200	III	
2009	Hightap	Shaun Bridgmohan	Steven M. Asmussen	Winchell Thoroughbreds & Gainesway Farm	1 mile	1:34.56	$111,500	III	
2008	Acoma	Robby Albarado	David M. Carroll	Helen C. Alexander & Helen K. Groves	1 mile	1:35.35	$109,000	III	
2007	Lady Joanne	Calvin H. Borel	Carl A. Nafzger	Bentley L. Smith Trust	1 mile	1:35.49	$167,550	III	
2006	Joint Effort	René R. Douglas	Dale L. Romans	Donald R. Dizney	1 mile	1:43.49	$167,850	III	
2005	Miss Matched	Shaun Bridgmohan	John T. Ward Jr.	John C. Oxley	1 1/16 miles	1:43.14	$162,900	III	
2004	Stellar Jayne	Robby Albarado	D. Wayne Lukas	Spendthrift Farm, Chuck Kidder, Nancy Cole & Nick Strong	1 1/16 miles	1:45.96	$161,400	III	
2003	Golden Marlin	Shane Sellers	Gregory D. Foley	Joe Famularo & William Glass	1 1/16 miles	1:42.73	$109,000	III	
2002	Take Charge Lady	Anthony J. D'Amico	Kenneth G. McPeek	Select Stable	1 1/16 miles	1:43.41	$109,500	III	
2001	Nasty Storm	Lonnie Meche	Dallas Stewart	D. Crum, D. Elser, R. McDonald, J. Riccelli & D. Stewart	1 1/16 miles	1:46.80	$109,700	III	
2000	Welcome Surprise	Francisco C. Torres	Neil J. Howard	William S. Farish III & Mrs. William S. Kilroy	1 1/16 miles	1:46.80	$109,700	III	
1999	Golden Temper	Shane Sellers	W. Elliott Walden	Mark Stanley	1 1/16 miles	1:43.73	$111,400	III	
1998	Really Polish	Pat Day	Joseph Petalino	Team Valor International	1 1/16 miles	1:44.78	$109,100	III	
1997	Leo's Gypsy Dancer	Pat Day	Hal R. Wiggins	Purse Strings Farm	1 1/16 miles	1:44.95	$111,300	Listed	
1996	Ginny Lynn	Larry Melancon	Niall M. O'Callaghan	New Top Racing Stable	1 1/16 miles	1:43.22	$82,425	Listed	
1995	Gal in a Ruckus	Herb McCauley	John T. Ward Jr.	John C. Oxley	1 1/16 miles	1:43.88	$82,350	Listed	
1994	Briar Road	Larry Melancon	Richard B. Kohnhorst	So True Stable	1 1/16 miles	1:44.78	$81,825	Listed	
1993	With a Wink	Charles R. Woods Jr.	D. Wayne Lukas	Melvin Hatley	1 1/16 miles	1:44.21	$55,400	Listed	
1992	Hitch	Brent E. Bartram	Steven C. Penrod	Claiborne Farm	1 1/16 miles	1:47.68	$55,500	Listed	
1991	Be Cool	Aaron Gryder	D. Wayne Lukas	Sugar Maple Farm & D. Wayne Lukas	1 1/16 miles	1:46.46	$56,250	Listed	
1990	Patches	K. Keith Allen	D. Wayne Lukas	Overbrook Farm & D. Wayne Lukas	1 1/16 miles	1:46.60	$53,650	Listed	
1989	Luthier's Launch	Pat Day	D. Wayne Lukas	Overbrook Farm	1 1/16 miles	1:45.20	$56,100	Listed	
1988	Darien Miss	Don Brumfield	George R. Arnold II	Taylor Asbury	1 1/16 miles	1:43.80	$55,150	Listed	
1987	Lady Gretchen	Michael McDowell	Gene Alfrey	Jogo Inc. & Gene Alfrey	1 1/16 miles	1:44.00	$70,650	Listed	
1986	Hail a Cab	Patrick A. Johnson	Philip M. Hauswald	John A. Bell III	1 1/16 miles	1:46.60	$71,600	Listed	
1985	Foxy Deen	Daryl Montoya	Ronnie G. Warren	Elmer Miller	1 1/8 miles	1:50.00	$64,300	Listed	
1984	Mrs. Revere	Larry Melancon	William I. Mott	Hiram Polk & David Richardson	1 1/8 miles	1:51.20	$75,650	Listed	
1983	Bon Gout	Pat Day	Steven C. Penrod	Claiborne Farm	1 1/8 miles	1.53.00	$55,950	Listed	
1982	Amazing Love	Larry Melancon	A. J. Foyt III	A. J. Foyt Jr.	1 1/16 miles	1:46.60	$36,225		
1981	Savage Love	Paul Nicolo	Timothy J. Walker	Carl Swan	7 furlongs	1:24.80	$29,187		Division 1
1981	Fancy Naskra	John Lively	Jerry D. Calvin	Jim Thomas	7 furlongs	1:25.20	$28,112		Division 2
1980	Quality Corner	Mark Sellers	Thomas H. Stevens Sr.	Mrs. William H. May	7 furlongs	1:24.00	$29,725		
1979	Split the Tab	Darrell Haire	Arnold Dickerson	Dinnaken Farm	7 furlongs	1:24.00	$30,250		
1978	Bold Rendezvous	Allen Rini	James E. Morgan	John Dolan, T. Wood Jr., & C. N. Lebanz	7 furlongs	1:23.40	$22,225		
1977	Unreality	Martin Fromin	Robert L. Irwin	Karil Vangeloff	7 furlongs	1:25.40	$23,125		
1976	T. V. Vixen	Mike Manganello	Peter W. Salmen Jr.	Crimson King Farm	7 furlongs	1:23.40	$21,775		
1975	My Juliet	Allen Hill	Steve A. Long	George Weasel	7 furlongs	1:24.00	$23,075		

== See also ==
List of American and Canadian Graded races
