= Honorable Miss Stakes =

- Class: Grade II
- Location: Saratoga Race Course; Saratoga Springs, New York, United States
- Inaugurated: 1985 (as Honorable Miss Stakes at Aqueduct Racetrack)
- Race type: Thoroughbred – Flat racing
- Website: NYRA

Race information
- Distance: 6 furlongs
- Surface: Dirt
- Track: left-handed
- Qualification: Fillies & mares, three-years-old and older
- Weight: 124 lbs. with allowances
- Purse: US$200,000 (2021)

The Honorable Miss Stakes is a Grade II American Thoroughbred horse race for fillies and mares that are three years old or older over a distance of six furlongs on the dirt track scheduled annually in September at Saratoga Race Course in Saratoga Springs, New York. The event currently carries a purse of $200,000.

== History ==
The event is named after the winning mare Honorable Miss who won the Fall Highweight Handicap twice at Belmont Park defeating male company.

The inaugural running of the event was on 3 November 1985 at Aqueduct Racetrack in Queens, New York during the NYRA Big A Fall Meeting as the Honorable Miss Stakes and was won by the three-year-old filly Schematic, who was trained by the US Hall of Fame trainer Nick Zito in a time of 1:10 1/5. The following year the distance of the event was increased to 1 mile, and in 1987 the event was moved to Belmont Park and held during the NYRA Fall Meeting in October.

The event was idle for four years, and NYRA resumed it they scheduled the race at Saratoga as a six-furlong sprint race.

In 1996 the event was classified as Grade III and upgraded to Grade II in 2004.

The distance for the event was increased to six and a half furlongs only for the 1993 running.

The event was run in split divisions in 2000.

In 2025 the conditions of the event were changes from a handicap to a stakes allowance.

== Records ==
Speed record:

- 6 furlongs: 1:08.74 – Come Dancing (2020)

Margins:

- 12 1/2 lengths – Wisla (1986)

Most wins:

- 2 – Bourbon Belle (1999, 2000)

Most wins by a jockey:

- 3 – Edgar S. Prado (2002, 2003, 2009)

Most wins by a trainer:

- 3 – Steven M. Asmussen (2005, 2015, 2023)

Most wins by an owner:

- 2 – George & Kay Hofmeister, Donna Salmen & Susan Bunning (1999, 2000)

== Winners ==
Year	Winner	Age	Jockey	Trainer	Owner	Distance	Time	Purse	Grade	Ref
At Saratoga – Honorable Miss Stakes
2026	Maida	4	Sheldon Russell	Brittany T. Russell	G. Harry Papaleo	6 furlongs	1:10.43	$250,000	II	
2025	Halina’s Forte	4	Irad Ortiz Jr.	Philip A. Bauer	Rigney Racing	6 furlongs	1:09.87	$200,000	II	
Honorable Miss Handicap
2024	Spirit Wind	5	Mike E. Smith	Saffie Joseph Jr.	Miller Racing	6 furlongs	1:10.36	$194,000	II	
2023	Echo Zulu	4	Flavien Prat	Steve Asmussen	L and N Racing & Winchell Thoroughbreds	6 furlongs	1:08.76	$186,000	II	
2022	Kimari	5	Joel Rosario	Wesley A. Ward	Derrick Smith, Mrs. John Magnier, Michael Tabor, Westerberg Limited & Jonathon Poulin	6 furlongs	1:10.78	$186,000	II	
2021	Bell's the One	5	Corey Lanerie	Neil Pessin	Lothenbach Stables	6 furlongs	1:09.83	$200,000	II	
2020	Come Dancing	6	Irad Ortiz Jr.	Carlos F. Martin	Blue Devil Racing Stable	6 furlongs	1:08.74	$150,000	II	
2019	Minit to Stardom	4	Alex Cintron	Jose M. Camejo	Brittlyn Stable	6 furlongs	1:08.81	$200,000	II	
2018	Finley'sluckycharm	5	Brian Hernandez Jr.	W. Bret Calhoun	Carl R. Moore	6 furlongs	1:09.48	$194,000	II	
2017	Paulassilverlining	5	José L. Ortiz	Chad C. Brown	Juddmonte Farms	6 furlongs	1:10.10	$196,000	II	
2016	Haveyougoneaway	5	Kendrick Carmouche	Thomas Morley	Sequel Racing	6 furlongs	1:09.94	$200,000	II	
2015	† Street Story	4	Javier Castellano	Steven M. Asmussen	Whispering Oaks Farm	6 furlongs	1:09.14	$190,000	II	
2014	R Free Roll	4	Paco Lopez	Danny Gargan	Averill Racing & Silver Oak Stable	6 furlongs	1:10.12	$200,000	II	
2013	Dance to Bristol	4	Xavier Perez	Ollie L. Figgins III	Susan H. Wantz	6 furlongs	1:09.73	$200,000	II	
2012	C C's Pal	5	Junior Alvarado	Richard E. Dutrow Jr.	Eric Fein	6 furlongs	1:09.88	$200,000	II	
2011	Tar Heel Mom	6	Alex O. Solis	Stanley M. Hough	Alex Rankin	6 furlongs	1:10.42	$150,000	II	
2010	Secret Gypsy	5	Jamie Theriot	Ronny W. Werner	Richland Hills Stable & John Kuehl	6 furlongs	1:09.82	$147,000	II	
2009	Game Face	4	Edgar S. Prado	Todd A. Pletcher	Zabeel Racing International	6 furlongs	1:10.70	$150,000	II	
2008	Any Limit	5	Cornelio Velásquez	H. Allen Jerkens	Joseph V. Shields Jr.	6 furlongs	1:09.98	$147,000	II	
2007	Burmilla	4	Rafael Bejarano	Eoin G. Harty	Darley Stable	6 furlongs	1:09.51	$147,000	II	
2006	Stormy Kiss (ARG)	4	Javier Castellano	Barclay Tagg	Lael Stables	6 furlongs	1:10.58	$150,000	II	
2005	Forest Music	4	John R. Velazquez	Steven M. Asmussen	Stonestreet Stables	6 furlongs	1:10.06	$150,000	II	
2004	My Trusty Cat	4	Pat Day	David R. Vance	Carl F. Pollard	6 furlongs	1:10.37	$150,000	II	
2003	Willa On the Move	4	Edgar S. Prado	Anthony W. Dutrow	Peter G. Angelos	6 furlongs	1:09.92	$107,600	III	
2002	Mandy's Gold	4	Edgar S. Prado	Michael E. Gorham	Steeplechase Farm	6 furlongs	1:09.24	$108,500	III	
2001	Big Bambu	4	Jerry D. Bailey	Alan Sobol	Edward E. Marshall & John Schoonover	6 furlongs	1:09.64	$103,000	III	
2000	Debby d'Or	5	Shane Sellers	Daniel G. Switzer	Albert Lobrillo	6 furlongs	1:10.11	$110,750	III	Division 1
2000	Bourbon Belle	5	Willie Martinez	Peter W. Salmen Jr.	George & Kay Hofmeister, Donna Salmen & Susan Bunning	6 furlongs	1:08.93	$109,750	III	Division 2
1999	Bourbon Belle	4	Patrick A. Johnson	Peter W. Salmen Jr.	George & Kay Hofmeister, Donna Salmen & Susan Bunning	6 furlongs	1:09.53	$112,600	III	
1998	Furlough	4	Mike E. Smith	Claude R. McGaughey III	Ogden Phipps	6 furlongs	1:11.32	$81,275	III	
Honorable Miss Stakes
1997	Dancin Renee	5	Richard Migliore	Robert Triola	Sanford Bacon	6 furlongs	1:09.16	$80,775	III	
1996	Twist Afleet	5	Mike E. Smith	John C. Kimmel	Lucille Conover	6 furlongs	1:09.91	$81,675	III	
1995	Low Key Affair	4	Pat Day	D. Wayne Lukas	Moyglare Stud	6 furlongs	1:09.67	$80,325	Listed	
1994	Classy Mirage	4	Julie Krone	H. Allen Jerkens	Middletown Stables	6 furlongs	1:09.72	$81,126	Listed	
1993	Nannerl	6	Jerry D. Bailey	Flint S. Schulhofer	Marablue Farm	6 1/2 furlongs	1:15.19	$48,400		
1992	Nice Assay	4	Chris McCarron	J. Paco Gonzalez	John A. Toffan	6 furlongs	1:08.97	$52,700	Listed	
1988–1991		Race not held								
At Belmont Park
1987	Funistrada	4	Robbie Davis	Jan H. Nerud	John A. Nerud	1 mile	1:36.60	$55,500		
At Aqueduct
1986	Wisla	3	Jacinto Vásquez	David A. Whiteley	William Haggin Perry	1 mile	1:36.40	$53,750		
1985	Schematic	3	Robbie Davis	Nicholas P. Zito	William Hackman	6 furlongs	1:10.20	$85,950		

Notes:
† In 2015, La Verdad finished first but was later disqualified and unplaced for a drug violation.

== See also ==
List of American and Canadian Graded races
