= José Ortiz =

José Ortiz or Jose Ortiz may refer to:

== Arts and entertainment ==
- José Ortiz (comics) (1932–2013), Spanish comics artist
- José Damián Ortiz de Castro (1750–1793), Spanish architect
- José Luis Ortiz Güell (born 1967), Spanish writer, actor, and columnist

== Government and law ==
- José Ortiz Daliot (born 1945), Puerto Rican attorney and politician
- José Ortiz Galván (born 1983), Spanish politician
- José Ortiz de la Renta (1765–1850), Puerto Rican politician; mayor of Ponce
- José Agustín Ortiz Pinchetti (1937–2024), Mexican politician
- José Casimiro Ortíz de la Renta (1760–1830), Puerto Rican politician; mayor of Ponce

== Sports ==
=== Association football (soccer) ===
- José María Ortiz de Mendíbil (1926–2015), Spanish football referee
- José Ortiz (footballer, born 1977) (born 1977), Spanish football forward
- José Luis Ortiz (born 1985), Bolivian football midfielder
- Santos Ortíz (José Santos Ortiz Asencio, born 1990), Salvadoran footballer
- José Guillermo Ortiz (born 1992), Costa Rican footballer
- José Ortíz (footballer, born 1998) (born 1998), Colombian football defender

=== Other sports ===
- José Ortiz (outfielder) (1947–2011), Puerto Rican baseball player
- José Ortiz (basketball) (1963–2026), Puerto Rican basketball player
- José Ortiz (second baseman) (born 1977), Dominican baseball player
- José Ortiz (runner) (fl. 1990s), Spanish paralympic athlete
- José Ortiz (jockey) (born 1993), Puerto Rican horse racing jockey
- José Ortiz (race walker) (born 2000), Guatemalan racewalker

== Others ==
- José Ortiz-Echagüe (1886–1980), Spanish entrepreneur, engineer, pilot and photographer
- José Luis Ortiz Moreno (born 1967), Spanish astronomer

== Other uses ==
- José Leonardo Ortiz District, Peruvian geographical district
