= American Champion Female Sprint Horse =

Annual horseracing award

The American Champion Sprint Female Horse award is an American Thoroughbred horse racing honor awarded annually to the top female horse in sprint races usually run at a distance of 6 or 7 furlongs. This category honoring female sprinters became part of the Eclipse Awards program in 2007.

The Daily Racing Form, the National Thoroughbred Racing Association (NTRA), and the National Turf Writers Association joined forces in 1971 to create the Eclipse Award.

== Honorees ==
Year	Horse	Trainer	Owner
2025	Shisospicy	Jose Francisco D'Angelo	Morplay Racing, LLC and Qatar Racing, LLC
2024	Soul of an Angel	Saffie A. Joseph Jr.	C2 Racing Stable LLC, Agave Racing Stable & Ken T. Reimer
2023	Goodnight Olive	Chad Brown	First Row Partners & Team Hanley
2022	Goodnight Olive	Chad Brown	First Row Partners & Team Hanley
2021	Ce Ce	Michael W. McCarthy	Bo Hirsch
2020	Gamine	Bob Baffert	Michael Lund Petersen
2019	Covfefe	Brad H. Cox	LNJ Foxwoods
2018	Shamrock Rose	Mark E. Casse	Conrad Farms
2017	Unique Bella	Jerry Hollendorfer	Don Alberto Stable
2016	Finest City	Ian Kruljac	Seltzer Thoroughbreds LLC
2015	La Verdad	Linda Rice	Lady Sheila Stable
2014	Judy the Beauty	Wesley Ward	Wesley Ward
2013	Groupie Doll	William Bradley	William Bradley et al
2012	Groupie Doll	William Bradley	William Bradley et al
2011	Musical Romance	William A. Kaplan	William A. Kaplan & Pinnacle Racing Stable (Adam Lazarus, managing partner)
2010	Dubai Majesty	Bret Calhoun	Bill and Stephanie Martin and Dan Morgan
2009	Informed Decision	Jonathan E. Sheppard	Augustin Stable
2008	Indian Blessing	Bob Baffert	Patti & Hal J. Earnhardt III
2007	Maryfield	Doug O'Neill	Mark Gorman, Nick Mestrandrea & Jim Perry
