= Winning Colors Stakes =

- Class: Grade III
- Location: Churchill Downs; Louisville, Kentucky, United States
- Inaugurated: 2004
- Race type: Thoroughbred - Flat racing
- Website: www.churchilldowns.com

Race information
- Distance: 6 furlongs
- Surface: dirt
- Track: left-handed
- Qualification: Fillies and mares, four years old and older
- Weight: 123 lbs with allowances
- Purse: $250,000 (2024)

The Winning Colors Stakes is a Grade III American Thoroughbred horse race for fillies and mares, four years old and older over a distance six furlongs on the dirt scheduled annually in late May at Churchill Downs in Louisville, Kentucky.

== History ==
The event was inaugurated in 2004 as the Winning Colors Handicap in honor of the Kentucky Derby winning filly Winning Colors.

In 2007 the event was upgraded to a Grade III.

The event has been usually held on the Memorial Day weekend.

== Records ==
Speed record

- 1:08:07 - Dubai Majesty (2010)

Most wins

- 2 – Dubai Majesty (2009, 2010)
- 2 – Sconsin (2021, 2022)

Most wins by a jockey

- 3 – Julien R. Leparoux (2008, 2014, 2016)

Most wins by a trainer

- 4 – W. Bret Calhoun (2009, 2010, 2012, 2017)
- 4 – Steven M. Asmussen (2004, 2015, 2023, 2024)

Most wins by an owner

- 3 – Martin Racing Stable (2009, 2010, 2013)

== Winners ==
Year	Winner	Age	Jockey	Trainer	Owner	Distance	Time	Purse	Grade	Ref
Winning Colors Stakes
2026	Usha	4	Florent Geroux	Bob Baffert	Karl Watson, Michael E. Pegram & Paul Weitman	6 furlongs	1:10.21	$220,000	III	
2025	Two Sharp	4	Junior Alvarado	Philip A. Bauer	Rigney Racin	6 furlongs	1:08.75	$250,000	III	
2024	Clearly Unhinged	4	Joel Rosario	Steven M. Asmussen	Hill 'n' Dale Equine Holdings & Jarret Prussin	6 furlongs	1:09.69	$248,750	III	
2023	Echo Zulu	4	Florent Geroux	Steven M. Asmussen	L and N Racing & Winchell Thoroughbreds	6 furlongs	1:08.99	$223,250	III	
2022	Sconsin	5	Tyler Gaffalione	Gregory Foley	Lloyd Madison Farms IV	6 furlongs	1:08.18	$199,500	III	
2021	Sconsin	4	Tyler Gaffalione	Gregory Foley	Lloyd Madison Farms IV	6 furlongs	1:08.80	$150,000	III	
2020	Bell's the One	4	Corey Lanerie	Neil Pessin	Lothenbach Stable	6 furlongs	1:08.70	$100,000	III	
2019	Honey Bunny	5	Tyler Baze	John Alexander Ortiz	Hooties Racing, WSS Racing & 4G Racing	6 furlongs	1:09.99	$100,000	III	
2018	Miss Kentucky	4	Brian Hernandez Jr.	George R. Arnold II	Preston Madden	6 furlongs	1:10.35	$100,000	III	
2017	Finley'sluckycharm	4	Brian Hernandez Jr.	W. Bret Calhoun	Carl R. Moore Management	6 furlongs	1:09.87	$100,000	III	
2016†	Diva Express	4	Julien R. Leparoux	Mark E. Casse	John C. Oxley	6 furlongs	1:08.49	$100,000	III	
2016†	I'm a Looker	4	Robby Albarado	Patrick J. Dupuy	Glenmare Farm	6 furlongs	1:08.49	$100,000	III	
2015	Street Story	4	Florent Geroux	Steven M. Asmussen	Whispering Oaks Farm	6 furlongs	1:08.39	$100,000	III	
2014	Southern Honey	3	Julien R. Leparoux	George R. Arnold II	Ashbrook Farm	6 furlongs	1:08.67	$111,000	III	
2013	Beat the Blues	6	Miguel Mena	W. Bret Calhoun	Martin Racing Stable & Morgan Thoroughbreds	6 furlongs	1:08.59	$108,000	III	
2012	Island Bound	5	Leandro D. Goncalves	Ian R. Wilkes	Robert T. Manfus	6 furlongs	1:09.89	$111,100	III	
2011	Sassy Image	5	Corey J. Lanerie	Dale L. Romans	Jerry Romans	6 furlongs	1:08.59	$111,600	III	
2010	Dubai Majesty	5	Miguel Mena	W. Bret Calhoun	Martin Racing Stable, D. Morgan	6 furlongs	1:08.07	$110,500	III	
2009	Dubai Majesty	4	Jamie Theriot	W. Bret Calhoun	Martin Racing Stable, D. Morgan	6 furlongs	1:10.61	$108,900	III	
2008	Graeme Six	4	Julien R. Leparoux	Thomas M. Amoss	Tom O'Grady, Johns Martin & Team West Side Stable	6 furlongs	1:09.17	$107,600	III	
2007	Miss Macy Sue	4	Eusebio Razo Jr.	Kelly R. Von Hemel	Roll Reroll Stables	6 furlongs	1:08.68	$110,100	III	
2006	Ever Elusive	4	Rafael Bejarano	Todd A. Pletcher	Padua Stables	6 furlongs	1:09.14	$110,200	Listed	
2005	Molto Vita	5	Rafael Bejarano	Dallas Stewart	John D. Gunther	6 furlongs	1:09.50	$107,200	Listed	
Winning Colors Handicap
2004	Lady Tak	4	Shane Sellers	Steven M. Asmussen	Heiligbrodt Racing Stable	6 furlongs	1:08.87	$108,600	Listed	

Notes:
† Dead heat

== See also ==
- List of American and Canadian Graded races
