= Ballerina Handicap =

- Class: Grade I
- Location: Saratoga Race Course; Saratoga Springs, New York, United States
- Inaugurated: 1979
- Race type: Thoroughbred – Flat racing
- Website: NYRA

Race information
- Distance: 7 furlongs
- Surface: Dirt
- Track: left-handed
- Qualification: fillies & mares, Three-years-old & up
- Weight: Handicap
- Purse: $500,000 (2021)
- Bonuses: Winner qualifies for the Breeders' Cup Filly & Mare Sprint

The Ballerina Handicap is a Grade I American Thoroughbred horse race for fillies and mares that are three years old or older over a distance of seven furlongs on the dirt track scheduled annually in August at Saratoga Race Course in Saratoga Springs, New York. The event currently carries a purse of $500,000.

== History ==
The inaugural running of the Ballerina Stakes was 20 August 1979 and was won by the Ogden Phipps-owned three-year-old filly Blitey, who was ridden by the US Hall of Fame jockey Ángel Cordero Jr. on a muddy track in a time of 1:23 1/5. The race is named for Howell E. Jackson's filly, Ballerina, who won the 1954 inaugural running of the Maskette Stakes, run today as the Grade I Go For Wand Handicap.

In 1981 the event was classified as Grade III, upgraded to Grade II in 1984 and to Grade I in 1988. The sudden rise in stature of the event was due to the quality of runners who won this event and continued to win important Grade I races. In particular the winner of the second running in 1980 was the 1979 US Champion Three-Year-Old Filly Davona Dale, the 1983 winner Ambassador of Luck who went onto become the US Champion Older Dirt Female Horse and Lady's Secret, the 1985 winner as a three-year-old, who in the following year would win the Breeders' Cup Distaff.

The only dual winner of the event, Shine Again failed by a nose to win a third time as a six-year-old when she was beaten by the 13-1 outsider Harmony Lodge in 2003.

The event continues to be a part of the Breeders' Cup Challenge series with the winner of the Ballerina Stakes automatically qualifying for the Breeders' Cup Filly & Mare Sprint.

== Records ==
Speed record:

- 7 furlongs: 1:20.95 – Echo Zulu (2023)

Margins:

- 9 1/4 lengths – Hilda's Passion (2011)

Most wins:

- 2 – Shine Again (2001, 2002)

Most wins by a jockey:

- 5 – John Velazquez (2005, 2012, 2015, 2016, 2021)

Most wins by a trainer:

- 5 – C. R. McGaughey III (1984, 1988, 1991, 1994, 1999)

Most wins by an owner:

- 2 – Ogden Phipps (1979, 1999)
- 2 – Eugene V. Klein (1985, 1986)
- 2 – Kinsman Stable (1993, 2000)
- 2 – Bohemia Stable (2001, 2002)

== Winners ==
Year	Winner	Age	Jockey	Trainer	Owner	Distance	Time	Purse	Grade	Ref
Ballerina Handicap
2026	Ways and Means	5	Flavien Prat	Chad C. Brown	Klaravich Stables	7 furlongs	1:22.05	$500,000	I	
2025	Hope Road	4	Jose Ortiz	Bob Baffert	Cicero Farms	7 furlongs	1:21.93	$500,000	I	
2024	Society	5	Tyler Gaffalione	Steven Asmussen	Peter E. Blum Thoroughbreds	7 furlongs	1:22.00	$500,000	I	
2023	Echo Zulu	4	Florent Geroux	Steven Asmussen	L and N Racing & Winchell Thoroughbreds	7 furlongs	1:20.95	$500,000	I	
2022	Goodnight Olive	4	Irad Ortiz Jr.	Chad C. Brown	First Row Partners & Team Hanley	7 furlongs	1:21.40	$500,000	I	
2021	Gamine	4	John Velasquez	Bob Baffert	Micheal Lund Petersen	7 furlongs	1:21.61	$500,000	I	
Ballerina Stakes
2020	Serengeti Empress	4	Luis Saez	Thomas M. Amoss	Joel Politi	7 furlongs	1:21.63	$300,000	I	
2019	Come Dancing	5	Javier Castellano	Carlos F. Martin	Blue Devil Racing Stable	7 furlongs	1:21.48	$480,000	I	
2018	Marley's Freedom	4	Mike E. Smith	Bob Baffert	Cicero Farms	7 furlongs	1:21.39	$500,000	I	
2017	By the Moon	5	Rajiv Maragh	Michelle Nevin	Jay Em Ess Stable	7 furlongs	1:22.97	$500,000	I	
2016	Haveyougoneaway	5	John R. Velazquez	Thomas Morley	Gary Barber & Sequel Racing	7 furlongs	1:21.63	$500,000	I	
2015	Unbridled Forever	4	John R. Velazquez	Dallas Stewart	Charles E. Fipke	7 furlongs	1:22.54	$500,000	I	
2014	Artemis Agrotera	3	Rajiv Maragh	Michael E. Hushion	Chester Broman & Mary R. Broman	7 furlongs	1:21.89	$500,000	I	
2013	Dance to Bristol	4	Xavier Perez	Ollie L. Figgins III	Susan H. Wantz	7 furlongs	1:23.11	$500,000	I	
2012	Turbulent Descent	4	John R. Velazquez	Todd A. Pletcher	Michael B. Tabor, Mrs. John Magnier & Derrick Smith	7 furlongs	1:22.13	$500,000	I	
2011	Hilda's Passion	4	Javier Castellano	Todd A. Pletcher	Starlight Racing	7 furlongs	1:22.06	$250,000	I	
2010	Rightly So	4	Cornelio Velásquez	Anthony W. Dutrow	Zayat Stables	7 furlongs	1:22.58	$250,000	I	
2009	Music Note	4	Rajiv Maragh	Saeed bin Suroor	Godolphin Stables	7 furlongs	1:22.10	$294,000	I	
2008	Intangaroo	4	Alonso Quinonez	Gary Sherlock	Tom Grether Farms	7 furlongs	1:22.18	$239,333	I	
2007	Maryfield	6	Elvis Trujillo	Doug F. O'Neill	Mark Gorman, Nick J. Mestrandrea & Jim Perry	7 furlongs	1:22.78	$250,000	I	
2006	Dubai Escapade	4	Edgar S. Prado	Eoin G. Harty	Darley Stable	7 furlongs	1:23.07	$240,000	I	
2005	Happy Ticket	4	John R. Velazquez	Andrew Leggio Jr.	Stewart Mather Madison	7 furlongs	1:24.53	$250,000	I	
Ballerina Handicap
2004	Lady Tak	4	Jerry D. Bailey	Steven M. Asmussen	Heiligbrodt Racing Stable	7 furlongs	1:21.09	$250,000	I	
2003	Harmony Lodge	5	Richard Migliore	Todd A. Pletcher	Eugene & Laura Melnyk	7 furlongs	1:22.23	$250,000	I	
2002	Shine Again	5	Jean-Luc Samyn	H. Allen Jerkens	Bohemia Stable	7 furlongs	1:22.26	$250,000	I	
2001	Shine Again	4	Jean-Luc Samyn	H. Allen Jerkens	Bohemia Stable	7 furlongs	1:22.33	$250,000	I	
2000	Dream Supreme	3	Pat Day	William I. Mott	Kinsman Stable	7 furlongs	1:22.97	$250,000	I	
1999	Furlough	5	Mike E. Smith	Claude R. McGaughey III	Ogden Phipps	7 furlongs	1:23.04	$200,000	I	
1998	Stop Traffic	5	Shane Sellers	Richard E. Mandella	Diamond A Racing	7 furlongs	1:22.23	$200,000	I	
1997	Pearl City	3	Joe Bravo	D. Wayne Lukas	Overbrook Farm	7 furlongs	1:22.39	$150,000	I	
1996	Chaposa Springs	4	Shane Sellers	Martin D. Wolfson	Suresh Chintamaneni	7 furlongs	1:21.80	$150,000	I	
1995	Classy Mirage	5	Julie Krone	H. Allen Jerkens	Middletown Stable	7 furlongs	1:22.40	$150,000	I	
1994	§ Roamin Rachel	4	Pat Day	Claude R. McGaughey III	Tri Honors Stable	7 furlongs	1:21.80	$108,400	I	
Ballerina Stakes
1993	Spinning Round	4	Jorge F. Chavez	Carl J. Domino	Kinsman Stable	7 furlongs	1:21.40	$115,200	I	
1992	Serape	4	Chris Antley	Henrietta Alexander George	Helen K. Groves	7 furlongs	1:21.20	$118,600	I	
1991	Queena	5	Mike E. Smith	Claude R. McGaughey III	Emory A. Hamilton	7 furlongs	1:22.00	$120,400	I	
1990	§ Feel The Beat	5	José A. Santos	D. Wayne Lukas	H. Joseph Allen	7 furlongs	1:22.00	$119,800	I	
1989	Proper Evidence	4	Chris Antley	John L. Dalton	Harry A. Gampel	7 furlongs	1:23.20	$121,800	I	
1988	Cadillacing	4	Ángel Cordero Jr.	Claude R. McGaughey III	Ogden Mills Phipps	7 furlongs	1:21.60	$115,000	I	
1987	I'm Sweets	4	Eddie Maple	Woodford C. Stephens	Brushwood Stable	7 furlongs	1:22.60	$114,600	II	
1986	Gene's Lady	5	Randy Romero	D. Wayne Lukas	Eugene V. Klein	7 furlongs	1:22.40	$113,200	II	
1985	§ Lady's Secret	3	Donald MacBeth	D. Wayne Lukas	Eugene V. Klein	7 furlongs	1:22.60	$90,300	II	
1984	Lass Trump	4	Pat Day	Claude R. McGaughey III	Alan Samford	7 furlongs	1:21.80	$86,400	II	
1983	Ambassador of Luck	4	Antonio Graell	Mitchell C. Preger	Envoy Stable	7 furlongs	1:22.20	$54,400	III	
1982	Expressive Dance	4	Donald MacBeth	Stanley M. Hough	Diana M. Firestone	7 furlongs	1:22.80	$58,600	III	
1981	Love Sign	4	Ruben Hernandez	Sidney J. Watters Jr.	Stephen C. Clark Jr.	7 furlongs	1:22.60	$54,000	III	
1980	Davona Dale	4	Jorge Velásquez	John M. Veitch	Calumet Farm	7 furlongs	1:22.20	$56,330	Listed	
1979	Blitey	3	Ángel Cordero Jr.	Angel Penna Sr.	Ogden Phipps	7 furlongs	1:23.20	$42,750	Listed	

Notes:
§ Ran as an entry

== See also ==
List of American and Canadian Graded races
