= Breeders' Cup Filly & Mare Sprint =

American Thoroughbred horse race

- Class: Grade I
- Location: United States
- Inaugurated: 2007
- Race type: Thoroughbred – Flat racing

Race information
- Distance: 7 furlongs (1408 m)
- Surface: Dirt
- Track: left-handed
- Qualification: Fillies & Mares, three-years-old & up
- Weight: Assigned
- Purse: US$1,000,000

The Breeders' Cup Filly & Mare Sprint is a 7-furlong (1408 m) Weight for Age stakes race for thoroughbred fillies and mares three years old and up. As its name implies, it is a part of the Breeders' Cup World Championships, the de facto year-end championship for North American thoroughbred racing, generally held in the United States (also held one time in Canada). The race is run on a dirt course (either natural dirt or a synthetic surface such as Polytrack).

The race was run for the first time in 2007 during the first day of the expanded Breeders' Cup at that year's host track, Monmouth Park Racetrack in Oceanport, New Jersey. In 2009, the race became a Grade I event.

The 2007 race was held at a distance of 6 furlongs (1207 m) instead of the normal distance of 7 furlongs because of the configuration of the dirt track at Monmouth Park.

== Automatic berths ==
Beginning in 2007, the Breeders' Cup developed the Breeders' Cup Challenge, a series of races in each division that allotted automatic qualifying bids to winners of defined races. Each of the fourteen divisions has multiple qualifying races. Note though that one horse may win multiple challenge races, while other challenge winners will not be entered in the Breeders' Cup for a variety of reasons such as injury or travel considerations.

In the Filly & Mare Sprint division, runners are limited to 14 and there are up to three automatic berths. The 2022 "Win and You're In" races were:

1. the Princess Rooney Stakes, a Grade 2 race run in July at Gulfstream Park in Florida
2. the Ballerina Stakes, a Grade 1 race at Saratoga Race Course in upstate New York
3. the Thoroughbred Club of America Stakes, a Grade 2 race at Keeneland Race Course in Kentucky

== Records ==
Most wins:

- 2 – Groupie Doll (2012, 2013)
- 2 - Goodnight Olive (2022, 2023)

Most wins by a jockey:

- 4 – Irad Ortiz Jr. (2017, 2018, 2022, 2023)

Most wins by a trainer:

- 4 – Chad C. Brown (2015, 2022, 2023, 2026)

Most wins by an owner:

- 2 – Fred Bradley, William Bradley, Brent Burns, Carl Hurst (2012, 2013)
- 2 – First Row Partners & Team Hanley (2022, 2023)

== Winners ==
Year	Winner	Age	Jockey	Trainer	Owner	Time	Purse	Grade
2026	Ways And Means	5	Flavien Prat	Chad C. Brown	Klaravich Stables	1:21.76	$1,000,000	I
2025	Splendora	4	Flavien Prat	Bob Baffert	Talla Racing	1:21.79	$1,000,000	I
2024	Soul of an Angel	5	Drayden Van Dyke	Saffie Joseph Jr.	2 Racing Stable LLC, Agave Racing Stable and Reimer, Ken T.	1:21.59	$1,000,000	I
2023	Goodnight Olive	5	Irad Ortiz Jr.	Chad C. Brown	First Row Partners & Team Hanley	1:22.97	$1,000,000	I
2022	Goodnight Olive	4	Irad Ortiz Jr.	Chad C. Brown	First Row Partners & Team Hanley	1:21.61	$1,000,000	I
2021	Ce Ce	5	Victor Espinoza	Michael McCarthy	Bo Hirsch	1:21.00	$1,000,000	I
2020	Gamine	3	John Velazquez	Bob Baffert	Eclipse Partners, Madaket Stables & Heider Family Stables	1:20.20	$1,000,000	I
2019	Covfefe	3	Joel Rosario	Brad H. Cox	LNJ Foxwoods	1:22.40	$1,000,000	I
2018	Shamrock Rose	3	Irad Ortiz Jr.	Mark E. Casse	Conrad Farms	1:23.13	$1,000,000	I
2017	Bar of Gold	5	Irad Ortiz Jr.	John C. Kimmel	Chester Broman & Mary Broman	1:22.63	$1,000,000	I
2016	Finest City	4	Mike Smith	Ian Kruljac	Seltzer Thoroughbreds	1:22.37	$1,000,000	I
2015	Wavell Avenue	4	Joel Rosario	Chad C. Brown	Michael Dubb, David Simon & Bethlehem Stables	1:22.39	$1,000,000	I
2014	Judy the Beauty	5	Mike Smith	Wesley Ward	Wesley Ward	1:21.92	$1,000,000	I
2013	Groupie Doll	5	Rajiv Maragh	William Bradley	Fred Bradley, William Bradley, Brent Burns, Carl Hurst	1:20.75	$1,000,000	I
2012	Groupie Doll	4	Rajiv Maragh	William Bradley	Fred Bradley, William Bradley, Brent Burns, Carl Hurst	1:20.72	$1,000,000	I
2011	Musical Romance	4	Juan Leyva	William A. Caplan	William A. Kaplan & Pinnacle Racing Stable	1:23.47	$1,000,000	I
2010	Dubai Majesty	5	Jamie Theriot	W. Bret Calhoun	Martin Racing Stable & Dan Morgan	1:22:33	$1,000,000	I
2009	Informed Decision	4	Julien Leparoux	Jonathan Sheppard	Augustin Stable	1:21.66	$1,000,000	I
2008	Ventura	4	Garrett Gomez	Robert J. Frankel	Juddmonte Farms	1:19.90	$1,000,000	
2007	Maryfield	6	Elvis Trujillo	Doug O'Neill	Mark Gorman, Jim Perry & Nick J. Mestrandrea	1:09.85†	$1,000,000	

† – Run at 6 furlongs

== See also ==
- Breeders' Cup Filly & Mare Sprint "top three finishers" and starters
- Breeders' Cup World Thoroughbred Championships
- American thoroughbred racing top attended events
