= 1978 in sports =

1978 in sports describes the year's events in world sport.

== Alpine skiing ==
- Alpine Skiing World Cup
  - Men's overall season champion: Ingemar Stenmark, Sweden
  - Women's overall season champion: Hanni Wenzel, Liechtenstein

== American football ==
- January 15 − Super Bowl XII: the Dallas Cowboys (NFC) won 27−10 over the Denver Broncos (AFC)
  - Location: Superdome
  - Attendance: 76,400
  - co–MVPs: Harvey Martin, DE and Randy White, DT (Dallas)
- The Holy Roller Game – Oakland Raiders vs San Diego Chargers
- Cotton Bowl (1977 season):
  - The Notre Dame Fighting Irish won 38–10 over the Texas Longhorns to win the college football national championship

== Artistic gymnastics ==
- World Artistic Gymnastics Championships –
  - Men's all-around champion: Nikolai Andrianov, USSR
  - Women's all-around champion: Elena Mukhina, USSR
  - Men's team competition champion: Japan
  - Women's team competition champion: USSR

== Association football ==
- Football World Cup – Argentina wins 3-1 (after extra time) over the Netherlands
- England - FA Cup – Ipswich Town win 1–0 over Arsenal
- England - League – Nottingham Forest win the championship as well as the League Cup
- La Liga won by Real Madrid
- Primeira Liga won by FC Porto
- Serie A won by Juventus
- French Division 1 won by AS Monaco
- European Cup won by (United Kingdom) Liverpool
- Kirin Cup tournament is first held in Japan (international club competition phase).
- Major Indoor Soccer League begins operations in the United States.

== Athletics ==
- August – 1978 Commonwealth Games held at Edmonton, Alberta, Canada
- September – 1978 European Championships in Athletics held at Prague
- December – 1978 Asian Games held at Bangkok, Thailand

== Australian rules football ==
Victorian Football League

- 1 July: Footscray beat Carlton's nine year record for the highest VFL score when they kick 33.15 (213) to St. Kilda’s 16.10 (106). Kelvin Templeton and Ian Dunstan amass 22 goals between them, equalling the 1931 record of Doug Strang and Jack Titus (who died that year).
- Hawthorn wins the 82nd VFL Premiership (Hawthorn 18.13 (121) d North Melbourne 15.13 (103))
- Brownlow Medal awarded to Malcolm Blight (North Melbourne)

South Australian National Football League

- 30 September: Norwood 16.15 (111) pip Sturt 14.26 (110) to win their twenty-fourth league premiership after the Double Blues had lost only one match all season.
- Magarey Medal awarded to Kym Hodgeman (Glenelg)

Western Australian National Football League

- 23 September: East Perth 11.15 (81) defeat Perth 12.7 (79) to win their fourteenth WA(N)FL premiership
- Sandover Medal won by Phil Kelly (East Perth)

== Baseball ==
- May 5, 1978 – Pete Rose of the Cincinnati Reds becomes the 13th player in Major League history to collect 3,000 career hits.
- June 14-July 31 – Pete Rose hits safely in 44 consecutive games, tying Willie Keeler’s all-time National League hitting streak.
- September 23 – Lyman Bostock (27) of the California Angels is shot and killed in error by a jealous husband.
- World Series – New York Yankees win 4 games to 2 over the Los Angeles Dodgers. The Series MVP is Bucky Dent, New York

== Basketball ==
- Wilt Chamberlain is elected to the Naismith Memorial Basketball Hall of Fame, along with coaches Sam Barry, Eddie Hickey, John McLendon, Ray Meyer and Pete Newell, and referee Jim Enright
- NCAA Men's Division I Basketball Championship –
  - Kentucky wins 94–88 over Duke
- NBA Finals –
  - Washington Bullets win 4 games to 3 over the Seattle SuperSonics
- FIBA World Championship
  - Yugoslavia World Champion

== Boxing ==
- February 15 – Leon Spinks defeats Muhammad Ali by decision in 15 rounds to win the world heavyweight title.
- Second World Amateur Boxing Championships held in Belgrade, Yugoslavia
- September 15 – Muhammad Ali recovers the world's heavyweight title, beating Leon Spinks by decision in their rematch. It is the first time a boxer wins the world heavyweight title for a third time.

== Canadian football ==
- Grey Cup – Edmonton Eskimos win 20–13 over the Montreal Alouettes
- Vanier Cup – Queen's Golden Gaels win 16–3 over the UBC Thunderbirds

== Cycling ==
- Giro d'Italia won by Johan de Muynck of Belgium
- Tour de France won by Bernard Hinault of France
- UCI Road World Championships – Men's road race – Gerrie Knetemann of Netherlands

== Dogsled racing ==
- Iditarod Trail Sled Dog Race Champion –
  - Dick Mackey wins with lead dogs: Skipper & Shrew

== Field hockey ==
- Men's World Cup held in Buenos Aires and won by Pakistan
- Men's European Nations Cup held in Hannover and won by West Germany
- Men's Champions Trophy held in Lahore and won by Pakistan
- Women's World Cup held in Madrid and won by the Netherlands

== Figure skating ==
- World Figure Skating Championships –
  - Men's champion: Charles Tickner, United States
  - Ladies’ champion: Anett Pötzsch, Germany
  - Pair skating champions: Irina Rodnina & Alexander Zaitsev, Soviet Union
  - Ice dancing champions: Natalia Linichuk & Gennadi Karponossov, Soviet Union

== Golf ==
Men's professional

- Masters Tournament - Gary Player
- U.S. Open - Andy North
- British Open - Jack Nicklaus
- PGA Championship - John Mahaffey
- PGA Tour money leader - Tom Watson - $362,429

Men's amateur

- British Amateur - Peter McEvoy
- U.S. Amateur - John Cook

Women's professional

- LPGA Championship - Nancy Lopez
- U.S. Women's Open - Hollis Stacy
- LPGA Tour money leader - Nancy Lopez - $189,814

== Harness racing ==
- United States Pacing Triple Crown races –
  1. Cane Pace - Armbro Tiger
  2. Little Brown Jug - Happy Escort
  3. Messenger Stakes - Abercrombie
- United States Trotting Triple Crown races –
  1. Hambletonian - Speedy Somolli
  2. Yonkers Trot - Speedy Somolli
  3. Kentucky Futurity - Doublemint
- Australian Inter Dominion Harness Racing Championship –
  - Pacers: Markovina
  - Trotters: Derby Royale

== Horse racing ==
Steeplechases

- Cheltenham Gold Cup – Midnight Court
- Grand National – Lucius

Hurdle races

- Champion Hurdle – Monksfield

Flat races

- Australia – Melbourne Cup won by Arwon
- Canada – Queen's Plate won by Regal Embrace
- France – Prix de l'Arc de Triomphe won by Alleged
- Ireland – Irish Derby Stakes won by Shirley Heights
- English Triple Crown Races:
  1. 2,000 Guineas Stakes – Roland Gardens
  2. The Derby – Shirley Heights
  3. St. Leger Stakes – Julio Mariner
- United States Triple Crown Races:
  1. Kentucky Derby – Affirmed
  2. Preakness Stakes – Affirmed
  3. Belmont Stakes – Affirmed

== Ice hockey ==
- Art Ross Trophy as the NHL’s leading scorer during the regular season: Guy Lafleur, Montreal Canadiens
- Hart Memorial Trophy for the NHL’s Most Valuable Player: Guy Lafleur, Montreal Canadiens
- Stanley Cup – Montreal Canadiens win 4 games to 2 over the Boston Bruins
- World Hockey Championship
  - Men’s champion: Soviet Union defeated Czechoslovakia
  - Junior Men’s champion: Soviet Union defeated Sweden
  - Note: In the early years of the Junior tournament, Canada did not send a true National Junior team to the event. Instead, the Memorial Cup champions usually went to represent Canada. The exception was 1978 in Montreal, when an “all-star” team was put together.
- Avco World Trophy - Winnipeg Jets won 4 games to 0 over the New England Whalers

== Orienteering ==
- 1978 World Orienteering Championships.

== Rowing ==
- March – The Cambridge boat sinks during the annual English University Boat Race, the first sinking in the race since 1951.

== Rugby league ==
- 15 January - 28 May 1978 European Rugby League Championship in England and France
- 15 March - 16 August 1978 Amco Cup in Australia and New Zealand
- 27 March – 17 September 1978 Brisbane Rugby League season in Australia
- 30 September - 6 December 1978 Kangaroo tour of Great Britain and France
- 1978 New Zealand rugby league season
- 1977–78 Northern Rugby Football League season / 1978–79 Northern Rugby Football League season
- 1978 NSWRFL season
  - 28 May – In a horrific accident at Penrith Park, Panther prop John Farragher is left a quadriplegic after breaking his neck in a scrum – the worst accident in rugby league history.

== Rugby union ==
- 84th Five Nations Championship series is won by Wales who complete the Grand Slam

== Snooker ==
- World Snooker Championship – Ray Reardon beats Perrie Mans 25–18
- World rankings – Ray Reardon remains world number one for 1978/79.

== Speed skating ==
- First ISU Short Track Speed Skating Championships for men and ladies held in Solihull, UK

== Swimming ==
- The third FINA World Championships held in West-Berlin, West Germany
- July 29 – USA's Ron Manganiello sets a world record in the 50m freestyle at a swimming meet in Miami, Florida (United States), shaving off 0.02 of the previous record (23.74) set by Joe Bottom a year ago: 23.72.

== Tennis ==
- Grand Slam in tennis men's results:
  1. Australian Open - Guillermo Vilas
  2. French Open - Björn Borg
  3. Wimbledon championships - Björn Borg
  4. U.S. Open - Jimmy Connors
- Grand Slam in tennis women's results:
  1. Australian Open - Chris O'Neil
  2. French Open - Virginia Ruzici
  3. Wimbledon championships - Martina Navratilova
  4. U.S. Open - Chris Evert
- Davis Cup – United States win 4–1 over Great Britain in world tennis.
- US Open moves to hard courts of the USTA National Tennis Center in Flushing Meadows, New York.
- Total prize money at US Open exceeds US$500,000.

== Triathlon ==
- First Ironman Triathlon held in Kona, Hawaii

== Volleyball ==
- 1978 FIVB Men's World Championship held in Rome and won by USSR

== Water polo ==
- 1978 World Aquatics Championships held in West Berlin and won by Italy.

== General sporting events ==
- Third All-Africa Games held in Algiers, Algeria
- Eighth Asian Games held in Bangkok, Thailand
- Central American and Caribbean Games held in Medellín, Colombia
- The Commonwealth Games held in Edmonton, Canada
- Ninth Winter Universiade held in Špindleruv Mlýn, Czechoslovakia

== Awards ==
- Associated Press Male Athlete of the Year – Ron Guidry, Major League Baseball
- Associated Press Female Athlete of the Year – Nancy Lopez, LPGA golf
