= Melinda Markey =

American actress (born 1934)

- Born: Melinda Mary Markey; February 27, 1934 (age 91); Los Angeles, California
- Education: University of Southern California
- Occupation: Actress
- Years active: 1952–1961
- Parents: Gene Markey (father); Joan Bennett (mother)

Melinda Markey (born February 27, 1934) is an American actress, known for her roles in 1950s film and television, often portraying young women in supporting roles.

== Early life ==
Melinda Mary Markey was born on February 27, 1934 in Los Angeles, to Hollywood actress Joan Bennett and screenwriter-producer Gene Markey. Notably, she was born on her mother's 24th birthday. Following her parents' separation during her infancy, Markey was raised primarily by her mother.

Growing up in a Hollywood neighborhood, Markey was surrounded by prominent figures of the entertainment industry, including Art Linkletter, Liza Minnelli, Ronald Reagan, Lauren Bacall, Humphrey Bogart, and Bing Crosby. This environment fostered her early interest in acting. She was the niece of actresses Barbara Bennett and Constance Bennett.

During her youth Markey spent time at Calumet Farm in Lexington, Kentucky, where she engaged in horseback riding alongside actress Elizabeth Taylor. One of the farm's notable horses, Our Mims, was named in her honor and later became a champion racehorse.

== Career ==
Markey began her acting career in the early 1950s, appearing in both film and television productions. Her film debut was in the 1953 drama Titanic, where she played a minor role. She subsequently appeared in several films throughout the 1950s, including The Other Woman (1954), Woman's World (1954), Crashout (1955), Prince of Players (1955), and Guns of the Timberland (1960).

In addition to her film work, Markey made numerous television appearances during the 1950s and early 1960s. She had guest roles on popular series such as Dragnet, Richard Diamond, Private Detective, M Squad, Alcoa Theatre, and Matinee Theater. Also she appeared on Broadway, portraying the character Marcia Giles in the 1953 production of On Borrowed Time.

== Personal life ==
Markey has been married three times. She was first married to actor Don Hayden from October 1954 until their divorce in September 1958. Subsequently, she married Joseph Albert Bena Jr., and later, on July 5, 1998, she married Thierry Van Dyck, with whom she remains married. She has three children.

== Filmography ==
- Westinghouse Preview Theatre (1961) – Recepsionist
- Guns of the Timberland (1960) – Girl Admiring Loggers
- M Squad (1959)
- Dragnet (1959)
- Alcoa Theatre (1958) – Marian
- Love That Jill (1958)
- Richard Diamond, Private Detective (1958) – Nurse
- Matinee Theater (1957)
- Daddy Long Legs (1955)
- The Halls of Ivy (1955)
- Fireside Theatre (1955)
- Crashout (1955) – Girl in Bar
- Prince of Players (1955)
- The Other Woman (1954)
- The Adventures of Hajji Baba (1954)
- Woman's World (1954)
- General Electric Theater (1954) – Alison Blane
- How to Marry a Millionaire (1953)
- Titanic (1953) – College Girl
- Biff Baker, U.S.A. (1952)
