= Believe It (horse) =

American-bred Thoroughbred racehorse

- Sire: In Reality
- Grandsire: Intentionally
- Dam: Breakfast Bell
- Damsire: Buckpasser
- Sex: Stallion
- Foaled: 1975
- Country: United States
- Colour: Chestnut
- Breeder: Hickory Tree Farm
- Owner: Hickory Tree Stable
- Trainer: Woody Stephens
- Record: 17: 6-6-2
- Earnings: $350,483

Major wins
- Wood Memorial Stakes (1978)

Believe It (February 9, 1975 – June 5, 2002) was an American bred racehorse. His sire was In Reality and his dam was Breakfast Bell. He won 6 of his 17 starts. His biggest win was the 1978 Wood Memorial Stakes. He also won the 1977 Remsen Stakes, defeating Alydar by two lengths on a sloppy track, the only loss either Alydar or Affirmed suffered to a horse other than each other prior to the 1978 Kentucky Derby.

Early in 1978, The Washington Post declared Believe It to be one of the best three-year-olds in 1978, and his trainer, Woody Stephens said the colt was one of the best he had ever trained. "Believe It was a very nice colt last year and if I know anything at all it's that he has improved greatly this winter." However, he lost to Alydar in the Flamingo Stakes on March 4, finishing a disappointing fourth. He lost again to Alydar in the Florida Derby on April 1 by two lengths. He bounced back in the Wood Memorial April 22, defeating Darby Creek Road by 3 1/2 lengths and completing the 1 1/8 mile race in 1:49 4/5.

Following his victory in the Wood Memorial, he entered the 1978 Kentucky Derby as the fourth choice at 7–1, behind Alydar, Affirmed and Sensitive Prince. After leading Affirmed by a head with a quarter mile to go, he faded to third in the Derby, behind only eventual Triple Crown winner Affirmed and Alydar. He finished the derby 2 3/4 lengths behind Affirmed and just 1 1/4 lengths behind Alydar. Two weeks later at 6-1 odds, he again finished third behind Affirmed and Alydar in the 1978 Preakness Stakes, although much farther back at 7 1/2 lengths. His jockey in the Kentucky Derby and Preakness Stakes was Eddie Maple. After the Preakness, trainer Woody Stephens announced that Believe It would not challenge the two horses in the Belmont Stakes. "I'm going to where they ain't. In the Derby, Believe It was beaten by less than three lengths. In the Preakness, it was nearly eight. So long, Affirmed. Bye-bye, Alydar."

Stephens chose teen phenom jockey Steve Cauthen to ride Believe It in the June 18 Ohio Derby. With Cauthen aboard, Believe It was the heavy favorite, but finished sixth in the race. He was retired to stud afterwards.

Believe It sired several grade 1 winners. He was the damsire of 1998 Kentucky Derby and Preakness Stakes winner Real Quiet, who lost the Triple Crown by a nose in the 1998 Belmont Stakes. Still at stud with some offspring to come in 2003, he died in his paddock on June 5, 2002, at Clear Creek Stud in Folsom, Louisiana and was buried at the farm.
