= Warren Wright Sr. =

American racehorse owner

Coordinates: 38.0416°N 84.4904°W

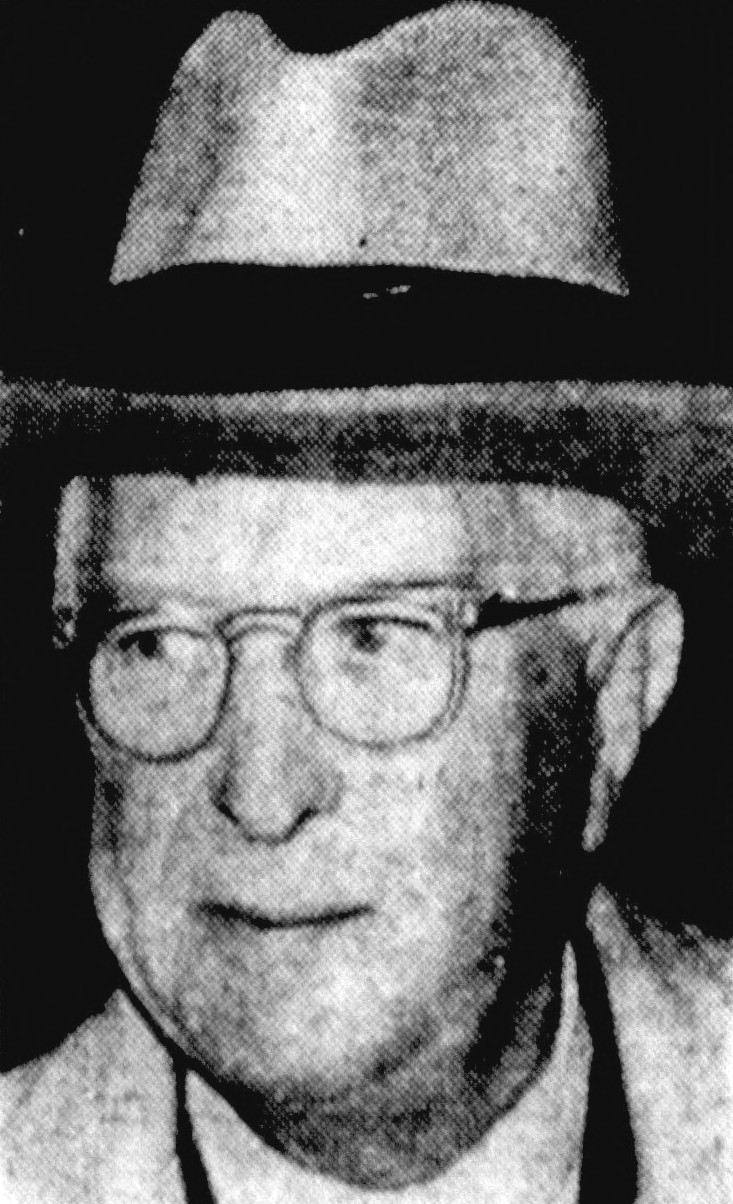
- Wright, circa 1950
- Born: September 25, 1875; Springfield, Ohio
- Died: December 28, 1950 (aged 75); Miami Beach, Florida
- Resting place: Rosehill Cemetery, Chicago
- Education: Business College
- Occupation(s): Businessman, racehorse owner & breeder
- Known for: Calumet Baking Powder Company, Calumet Farm
- Board member of: Calumet Baking Powder Company
- Spouse: Lucille Parker
- Children: Warren Wright Jr. (adopted) (1920-1978)
- Parent(s): William Monroe Wright & Clara Lee Morrison
- Honors: Pillar of the Turf (2019)

Warren Wright Sr. (September 25, 1875 Springfield, Ohio – December 28, 1950 Miami Beach, Florida), was the owner of one of America's most successful Thoroughbred horse racing operations.

== Biography ==
Wright was born in Ohio and raised in Chicago. In 1914, he became chairman of Chicago's Calumet Baking Powder company. He took the reins from his father, William Monroe Wright (1851 - 1931) the founder of the company . He guided it so prosperously that Calumet Baking Powder was sold for $32 million in the summer of 1929 to a New York company, Postum. Postum, with numerous acquisitions, soon became General Foods. The purchase and subsequent Wall Street Crash of 1929, just months later, left the Wrights among the wealthiest people in America during the Great Depression.

Warren Wright Sr. would also make his name and that of the family business the "gold standard" for Thoroughbred racing and breeding. William Monroe Wright had moved a Standardbred horse farm from Illinois to Kentucky in 1924. Upon the elder Wright's death in 1931, Warren Wright converted the Lexington farm, which bore the company name, from Standardbreds to Thoroughbreds. During his 18-year reign, Calumet Farm would become a dominant American stable and a tourist destination in the Bluegrass region of Kentucky. Calumet Farm was often compared to the New York Yankees (baseball), Boston Celtics (basketball) and Montreal Canadiens (hockey), as a sports dynasty.

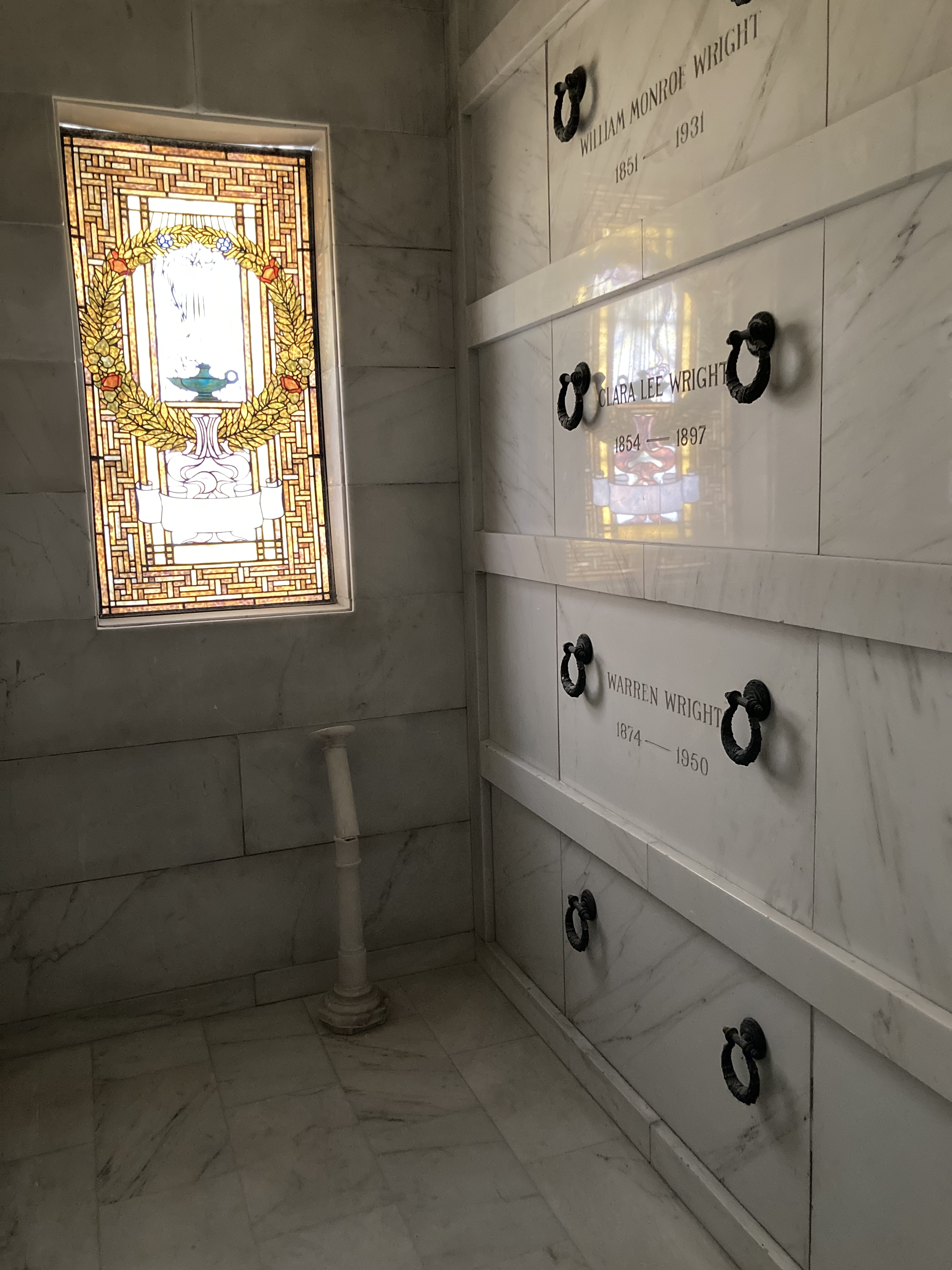
Wright's grave at Rosehill Mausoleum

With Ben A. Jones as his trainer, Bull Lea as his main stallion, and a bevy of choice broodmares, Wright bred and raced winners of five American Horse of the Year titles in the 1940s alone. They were: Whirlaway (1941 & 1942), Twilight Tear (1944), Armed (1947), and Citation (1948). Additionally, Calumet's Whirlaway (1941) and Citation (1948) won the United States Triple Crown of Thoroughbred Racing, and were national fan favorites. Wright won four Kentucky Derbys in his lifetime. After his death, his widow Lucille Parker Wright - who had married Admiral Gene Markey - carried on the tradition and won another four as Calumet Farm set the record of eight official Derby winners. Its racing silks were known throughout the land as the famous "devil's red and blue".

In 1934, Mr. Wright had given National Museum of Racing and Hall of Fame inductee Eddie Arcaro his start by putting him under contract and letting him ride at Narragansett Park during its inaugural year. Arcaro would ride three of Calumet's Derby winners and both Triple Crown winners.

In late summer of 1949, Mr. Wright suffered a heart attack. Just after his 75th birthday, on December 28, 1950, he died at his winter residence in Miami Beach, Florida. He was interred at Rosehill Mausoleum in Rosehill Cemetery, Chicago.

Warren Wright Sr. has a memorial marker at Thoroughbred Park in Lexington, Kentucky. In 2019, Warren Wright Sr. was honored for his contribution to the Thoroughbred racing industry by the National Museum of Racing and Hall of Fame as one of its "Pillars of the Turf."
