= 1978 Belmont Stakes =

American horse race

110th Belmont Stakes
- Belmont Stakes
- Location: Belmont Park, Elmont, New York, United States
- Date: June 10, 1978
- Winning horse: Affirmed
- Winning time: 2:26 4/5
- Jockey: Steve Cauthen
- Conditions: Fast
- Surface: Dirt

The 1978 Belmont Stakes was the 110th running of the Belmont Stakes. It occurred on June 10, 1978, and was televised on CBS. Affirmed completed the 11th Triple Crown after his victories in the 1978 Kentucky Derby and the 1978 Preakness Stakes. As in the prior two legs of the Triple Crown, he narrowly defeated Alydar.

Affirmed and Alydar ran head to head for the last half mile of the mile and a half race, with Affirmed ultimately winning by a head. Affirmed's winning time of 2:26 4/5 was the 3rd best in history at the time, behind only Secretariat's all-time record of 2:24 in 1973 and Gallant Man's time of 2:26 3/5 in 1957. This was despite a slow early pace.

== Payout ==
The 110th Belmont Payout Schedule

Program Number	Horse Name	Win	Place	Show*
3	Affirmed	$3.20	$2.10	–
2	Alydar		$2.20	–
1	Darby Creek Road			–

* – No show wagering.

== Full chart ==
Finish	Lengths behind	Post position	Horse	Jockey	Trainer	Owner	Post time odds	Stakes
1		3	Affirmed	Steve Cauthen	Laz Barrera	Harbor View Farm	0.60	$110,580
2	Head	2	Alydar	Jorge Velásquez	John M. Veitch	Calumet Farm	1.10	$40,546
3	13	1	Darby Creek Road	Ángel Cordero Jr.	Lou Rondinello	James W. Phillips	9.90	$22,116
4	7 3/4	4	Judge Advocate	Jeffrey Fell	John W. Russell	Ogden Phipps	30.10	$11,058
5	1 1/2	5	Noon Time Spender	Ruben Hernandez	Antonio Arcodia	Miami Lakes Ranch	38.40	--

Race Information:

- Winning Breeder: Harbor View Farm
- Final Time: 2:26.80
- Attendance:
