= 1978 Kentucky Derby =

Horse race

- Kentucky Derby
- Grade I stakes race
- Location: Churchill Downs, Louisville, Kentucky
- Date: May 6, 1978
- Winning horse: Affirmed
- Jockey: Steve Cauthen
- Trainer: Laz Barrera
- Owner: Harbor View Farm
- Conditions: Fast
- Surface: Dirt
- Attendance: 131,004

The 1978 Kentucky Derby was the 104th running of the Kentucky Derby. Affirmed, under jockey Steve Cauthen, won the race by 1 1/2 lengths over Alydar. Believe It finished 3rd, 1 1/4 lengths behind Alydar, and 30:1 longshot Darby Creek Road finished 4th. Affirmed won the Triple Crown by defeating Alydar by decreasing margins in the Preakness Stakes and the Belmont Stakes.

11 horses competed in the race. Alydar went into the race as a 6:5 favorite, despite Affirmed having won 4 of the 6 previous races between the two. Affirmed went off at 9:5. Sensitive Prince and Believe It were the only other horses to go off at less than 30:1, at 9:2 and 7:1 respectively. Sensitive Prince and Affirmed, both frontrunners, were near the lead early in the race behind long shot Raymond Earl. Sensitive Prince took the lead at the first turn, but Affirmed gained the lead at the second turn. After attaining the lead, Affirmed held it for the remainder of the race except for a brief moment when Believe It led by a head. Alydar charged from the outside down the stretch, and overtook Believe It, despite the two horses bumping, but Alydar could not overtake Affirmed.

== Payout ==
The 104th Kentucky Derby Payout Schedule

Program Number	Horse Name	Win	Place	Show
2	Affirmed	$5.60	$2.80	$2.60
10	Alydar	-	$2.60	$2.40
9	Believe It	-	-	$2.80

== Results ==
Finished	Post	Horse	Jockey	Trainer	Owner	Time / behind	Odds
1st	2	Affirmed	Steve Cauthen^{[a]}	Laz Barrera	Harbor View Farm	2:01 1/5	9:5
2nd	10	Alydar	Jorge Velásquez	John M. Veitch	Calumet Farm	11/2	6:5
3rd	9	Believe It	Eddie Maple	Woody Stephens	Hickory Tree Stable	11/4	7:1
4th	7	Darby Creek Road	Donald Brumfield	Lou Rondinello	James W. (Wally) & Jody Galbreath Phillips		30:1
5th	3	Esops Foibles	Chris McCarron	Loren Rettele	Jerry Frankel		45:1
6th	11	Sensitive Prince	Mickey Solomone	H. Allen Jerkens	Top of the Marc Stable (Joseph Taub)		9:2
7th	8	Dr. Valeri	Rene Riera Jr.	Aurelio M. Perez	Virginio & Ronal Renzi		90:1
8th	5	Hoist the Silver	Richard DePass^{[b]}	Richard J. Fischer	Washington Stud (Jack E. Dasso/D. Golab/Perry Levinson/E.M. Solomon)		99:1
9th	6	Chief of Dixieland	Anthony Rini	Jake Morreale	Dixie-Jake, Inc.		99:1
10th	1	Raymond Earl	Robert L. Baird^{[c]}	Smiley Adams	Robert N. Lehmann		99:1
11th	4	Special Honor	Paul Nicolo	Elwood D. McCann	Linda Gaston & Alvin D. Haynes		99:1

- ^{a}Steve Cauthen was the youngest to ever ride in the Kentucky Derby.
- ^{b}Richard DePass became the first Jamaican jockey ever to ride in the Kentucky Derby.
- ^{c}Robert L. Baird was the oldest to ever ride in the Kentucky Derby.
- Winning Breeder: Harbor View Farm; (FL)
