= Lucille P. Markey =

American businesswoman (1896–1982)

Lucille Wright Markey
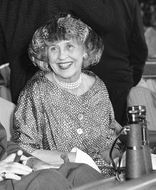
- Pictured at Hialeah Race Track, 1958
- Born: Lucille Parker; December 14, 1896; Maysville, Kentucky, U.S.
- Died: July 24, 1982 (aged 85); Miami, Florida, U.S.
- Resting place: Lexington Cemetery
- Occupations: Racehorse owner/breeder, philanthropist
- Known for: Calumet Farm
- Spouses: Warren Wright Sr. (m. 1919; died 1950); Gene Markey (m. 1952; died 1980)
- Children: 1

Lucille Parker Wright Markey (December 14, 1896 – July 24, 1982) was an American businesswoman and philanthropist who owned Calumet Farm, a Thoroughbred horse farm in the United States famous for breeding many winning racehorses.

== Early life ==
Lucille Parker was born in Maysville, Kentucky on December 14, 1896. The youngest of seven children, she was the daughter of a tobacco grower who also owned a livery stable. She is a distant relative, on her mother's side, of Confederate General Robert E. Lee. Her family, the Parkers, were reported to be relatives of Mary Todd Lincoln. In 1919 she married Warren Wright Sr. (1875–1950); their son Warren Jr. (died 1978) was born in 1920 and married and had four children.

== Thoroughbred racing ==
She inherited Calumet Farm on the death of her husband and ran it successfully for more than thirty years. Under her guidance, Calumet Farm won the Kentucky Derby four times, with Hill Gail (1952), Iron Liege (1957), Tim Tam (1958), and Forward Pass (1968). [The stable won the Derby four times previously under Warren Wright, Sr.'s ownership, with Whirlaway (1941), Pensive (1944), Citation (1948), and Ponder (1949).] Among her other horses, in 1977 her filly Our Mims (named after her second husband's daughter, Melinda) won the Eclipse Award as the American Champion Three-Year-Old Filly, in 1979 another filly, Davona Dale, won the Triple Tiara of Thoroughbred Racing (as well as finishing fourth in the 1979 Travers Stakes against colts), and in 1981 still another filly, Before Dawn, was voted the Eclipse Award as the American Champion Two-Year-Old Filly.

On September 27, 1952, Lucille Wright married screenwriter Admiral Gene Markey. With her new husband, she divided her time between Lexington, Kentucky, Miami Beach and Saratoga Springs. She owned a Yorkshire Terrier, Timmy Tammy, and carried the dog with her in her purse everywhere she went - even on airplanes. It has been speculated that Calumet's outstanding thoroughbred Tim Tam was named after the dog, but this has never been absolutely proven. Among her hobbies were needlepoint and collecting statues of eagles. In 18th-century Kentucky, eagles were widely believed to be a symbol of good luck.

In 1978, when Calumet Farm's outstanding three-year-old colt Alydar (named for Prince Aly Khan, and half-brother of Our Mims), ran in the Bluegrass States at Keeneland the Markeys (due to their failing health) were brought to the rail to watch him run. Alydar won in a time of 1:49.60. Admiral Markey died in 1980.

== Death and legacy ==
She established the Lucille P. Markey Charitable Trust. The Trust's aims were to benefit basic medical research. The University of Virginia's Molecular Biology Institute and the UC Santa Cruz RNA Center are among the many recipients of grants from the Trust.

Lucille Markey died on July 24, 1982, at the age of 85 in the Miami Heart Institute in Miami, Florida. She is buried next to her second husband, Admiral Gene Markey, in Lexington Cemetery in Lexington, Kentucky. As Warren Wright Jr., her only son and heir, predeceased her in 1978, his widow Bertha Cochran Wright and their four children (two sons and two daughters) inherited Calumet Farm, only to lose it under scandalous circumstances ten years later. Calumet Farm is now part of an investment trust company.

== Sources ==
- Wild Ride, Anne Hagedorn Auerbach, New York, Henry Holt & Company, 1994
