= Fantasy Stakes =

- Class: Grade II
- Location: Oaklawn Park Race Track; Hot Springs, Arkansas, United States
- Inaugurated: 1973
- Race type: Thoroughbred – Flat racing
- Website: www.oaklawn.com

Race information
- Distance: 1 1/16 miles
- Surface: Dirt
- Track: left-handed
- Qualification: Three-year-old fillies
- Weight: 121 lbs. with allowances
- Purse: US$750,000 (since 2024)

The Fantasy Stakes is a Grade II American Thoroughbred horse race for three-year-old fillies at a distance of one and one-sixteenth miles on the dirt run annually usually in early April at Oaklawn Park Race Track in Hot Springs, Arkansas. The event currently offers a purse of $750,000.

== History ==
The inaugural running of the event was on 6 April 1973 and was won by Robert E. Lehmann's Knitted Gloves coming from behind by 1 1/2 lengths in a time of 1:42 3/5.

After three runnings the event was upgraded to Grade II status in 1976 and in 1978 was once again upgraded to a Grade I, signifying that the race was a major event for the three-year-old fillies. Between 1978 and 1989 the event held this classification and in that time some impressive winners include Davona Dale in 1979 who captured the U.S. Filly Triple Crown becoming the U.S. Champion three-year-old filly, the 1980 winner and US Hall of Fame inductee Bold 'n Determined. The 1980 US Champion two-year-old filly Heavenly Cause won this event in her sophomore season. Other champions to win this event were Tiffany Lass, the 1986 U.S. Champion three-year-old filly and the 1987 winner Very Subtle who later that year would win the Breeders' Cup Sprint at Hollywood Park Racetrack.

In 1990, the event was downgraded to Grade II status and held this status until the 2012 running and the next year it was reclassified as Grade III

The 2008 winner Eight Belles won the event as a short 1/2 odds-on favorite in a four-horse field. Later that spring Eight Belles would be tragically euthanized after finishing second in the 2008 Kentucky Derby.

Two winners of this event have gone on to defeat their male counterparts in Triple Crown events. Rachel Alexandra, the winner in 2009 by the stakes record of 8 3/4 lengths went on to win the Preakness Stakes. She would later be crowned the US Horse of the Year. Also Swiss Skydiver, the 2020 winner would go on and win the Preakness Stakes defeating the Kentucky Derby winner Authentic.

The event is a prep race to the Triple Tiara of Thoroughbred Racing, including the Kentucky Oaks, Black-Eyed Susan Stakes and Mother Goose Stakes.

In 2024 the event was upgraded by the Thoroughbred Owners and Breeders Association back to Grade II.

== Records ==
Speed record:

- 1:41.20 – My Darling One (1984)

Margins:

- 8 3/4 lengths – Rachel Alexandra (2009)

Most wins by a jockey:

- 4 – Chris McCarron (1984, 1987, 1989, 1992)

Most wins by a trainer:

- 4 – Steven M. Asmussen (2016, 2017, 2019, 2021)

Most wins by an owner:

- 3 – Fox Hill Farms (2005, 2008, 2011)

== Winners ==
Year	Winner	Jockey	Trainer	Owner	Distance	Time	Purse	Grade	Ref
2026	Counting Stars	Francisco Arrieta	Mark E. Casse	West Point Thoroughbreds	1 1/16 miles	1:44.47	$1,000,000	II	
2025	Quietside	José L. Ortiz	John Alexander Ortiz	Shortleaf Stable	1 1/16 miles	1:44.31	$750,000	II	
2024	Thorpedo Anna	Brian Hernandez Jr.	Kenneth G. McPeek	Brookdale Racing, Mark Edwards, Judy B. Hicks & Magdalena Racing	1 1/16 miles	1:44.24	$750,000	II	
2023	Wet Paint	Flavien Prat	Brad H. Cox	Godolphin	1 1/16 miles	1:44.08	$600,000	III	
2022	Yuugiri	Florent Geroux	Rodolphe Brisset	Sekie Yoshihara & Tsunebumi Yoshihara	1 1/16 miles	1:43.65	$600,000	III	
2021	Pauline's Pearl	Ricardo Santana Jr.	Steven M. Asmussen	Stonestreet Stables	1 1/16 miles	1:43.64	$600,000	III	
2020	Swiss Skydiver	Brian Hernandez Jr.	Kenneth G. McPeek	Peter Callahan	1 1/16 miles	1:42.00	$400,000	III	
2019	Lady Apple	Ricardo Santana Jr.	Steven M. Asmussen	Phoenix Thoroughbred III & Katierich Stables	1 1/16 miles	1:43.88	$500,000	III	
2018	Sassy Sienna	Gary L. Stevens	Brad H. Cox	Medallion Racing & Jerry McClanahan	1 1/16 miles	1:45.63	$400,000	III	
2017	Ever So Clever	Luis Contreras	Steven M. Asmussen	Clearview Stable	1 1/16 miles	1:43.40	$400,000	III	
2016	Terra Promessa	Ricardo Santana Jr.	Steven M. Asmussen	Stonestreet Stables	1 1/16 miles	1:45.06	$400,000	III	
2015	Include Betty	Rosemary Homeister Jr.	Thomas F. Proctor	Brereton C. Jones & Timothy Thornton	1 1/16 miles	1:44.16	$400,000	III	
2014	Sugar Shock	Channing Hill	Doug L. Anderson	On Cloud Nine	1 1/16 miles	1:43.87	$400,000	III	
2013	Rose to Gold	Calvin H. Borel	Sal Santoro	Kathleen Amaya & Raffaele Centofanti	1 1/16 miles	1:45.80	$400,000	III	
2012	Mamma Kimbo	Mike E. Smith	Bob Baffert	Peachtree Stable	1 1/16 miles	1:43.64	$300,000	II	
2011	Joyful Victory	Mike E. Smith	J. Larry Jones	Fox Hill Farms	1 1/16 miles	1:44.74	$285,000	II	
2010	Blind Luck	Rafael Bejarano	Jerry Hollendorfer	Mark Dedomenico, John Carver, Peter Abruzzo & Jerry Hollendorfer	1 1/16 miles	1:42.56	$285,000	II	
2009	Rachel Alexandra	Calvin H. Borel	Hal R. Wiggins	L & M Partners	1 1/16 miles	1:43.35	$245,000	II	
2008	Eight Belles	Ramon A. Dominguez	J. Larry Jones	Fox Hill Farms	1 1/16 miles	1:43.06	$237,500	II	
2007	High Heels	Joe M. Johnson	Gary G. Hartlage	Anita A. Ebert	1 1/16 miles	1:44.43	$250,000	II	
2006	Ready to Please	Stewart Elliott	Todd A. Pletcher	James T. Scatuorchio	1 1/16 miles	1:45.63	$250,000	II	
2005	Round Pond	Stewart Elliott	John C. Servis	Fox Hill Farms	1 1/16 miles	1:43.49	$250,000	II	
2004	House of Fortune	Alex O. Solis	Ron McAnally	Arnold Zetcher	1 1/16 miles	1:42.62	$200,000	II	
2003	Ruby's Reception	Terry J. Thompson	J. Larry Jones	Oasis Racing Stable	1 1/16 miles	1:44.61	$200,000	II	
2002	See How She Runs	Donald R. Pettinger	Donnie K. Von Hemel	Pin Oak Stable	1 1/16 miles	1:43.80	$200,000	II	
2001	Mystic Lady	Eibar Coa	Mark A. Hennig	R. Lee Lewis	1 1/16 miles	1:43.52	$200,000	II	
2000	Classy Cara	Ignacio Puglisi	Doug F. O'Neill	John J. Zamora	1 1/16 miles	1:43.95	$200,000	II	
1999	Excellent Meeting	Kent J. Desormeaux	Bob Baffert	Golden Eagle Farm	1 1/16 miles	1:42.73	$250,000	II	
1998	Silent Eskimo	Carlos Gonzalez	Bobby C. Barnett	John A. Franks	1 1/16 miles	1:43.84	$250,000	II	
1997	Blushing K. D.	Lonnie Meche	Sam B. David Jr.	James & Sue Burns	1 1/16 miles	1:42.61	$250,000	II	
1996	Escena	Pat Day	William I. Mott	Allen E. Paulson	1 1/16 miles	1:43.93	$250,000	II	
1995	Cat's Cradle	Chris Antley	David E. Hofmans	Ridder Thoroughbred Stable	1 1/16 miles	1:44.29	$250,000	II	
1994	Two Altazano	Kirk Paul LeBlanc	Michael Stidham	Harold Goodman	1 1/16 miles	1:43.64	$250,000	II	
1993	Aztec Hill	Mike E. Smith	Thomas K. Bohannan	Loblolly Stable	1 1/16 miles	1:44.33	$250,000	II	
1992	Race the Wild Wind	Chris McCarron	Ron McAnally	Marianne & Brandon Chase	1 1/16 miles	1:43.74	$250,000	II	
1991	Lite Light	Corey Nakatani	Jerry Hollendorfer	Oaktown Stable	1 1/16 miles	1:41.93	$250,000	II	
1990	Silvered	Donald Lee Howard	Dewey Smith	Arthur B. Hancock III & Roy L. Bowen	1 1/16 miles	1:44.20	$250,000	II	
1989	Fantastic Look	Chris McCarron	Gary F. Jones	Mr. & Mrs. John C. Mabee	1 1/16 miles	1:43.20	$250,000	I	
1988	Jeanne Jones	Bill Shoemaker	Charles E. Whittingham	Mr. & Mrs. John C. Mabee	1 1/16 miles	1:42.20	$250,000	I	
1987	† Very Subtle	Chris McCarron	Melvin F. Stute	Ben Rochelle & Estate of Carl Grinstead	1 1/16 miles	1:42.40	$271,300	I	
1986	Tiffany Lass	Gary L. Stevens	Laz Barrera	Aaron U. Jones	1 1/16 miles	1:42.00	$274,400	I	
1985	Rascal Lass	Ray Sibille	Lin Wheeler	Vista Stable	1 1/16 miles	1:43.20	$282,700	I	
1984	My Darling One	Chris McCarron	Laz Barrera	Dolly Green	1 1/16 miles	1:41.20	$267,400	I	
1983	Brindy Brindy	Kenneth Jones	Jack Van Berg	Jane M. Martin	1 1/16 miles	1:44.60	$283,300	I	
1982	Flying Partner	Ray Sibille	Charles E. Whittingham	Buckland Farm	1 1/16 miles	1:47.00	$271,700	I	
1981	Heavenly Cause	Laffit Pincay Jr.	Woodford C. Stephens	Ryehill Farm	1 1/16 miles	1:43.80	$223,150	I	
1980	Bold 'n Determined	Eddie Delahoussaye	Neil D. Drysdale	Saron Stable	1 1/16 miles	1:45.20	$169,900	I	
1979	Davona Dale	Jorge Velasquez	John M. Veitch	Calumet Farm	1 1/16 miles	1:44.40	$169,350	I	
1978	Equanimity	Hank E. Moreno	Henry Moreno	Pine Tree Stable	1 1/16 miles	1:44.60	$129,750	I	
1977	Our Mims	Don Brumfield	John M. Veitch	Calumet Farm	1 1/16 miles	1:45.00	$139,850	II	
1976	T. V. Vixen	Bernie Walt	Peter W. Salmen Jr.	Crimson King Farm	1 1/16 miles	1:43.40	$121,950	II	
1975	Hoso	Mickey Solomone	Frank H. Merrill Jr.	Roxie Gian	1 1/16 miles	1:46.00	$118,250		
1974	Miss Musket	Bill Shoemaker	Charles E. Whittingham	Aaron U. Jones	1 1/16 miles	1:44.40	$122,900		
1973	Knitted Gloves	Julio C. Espinoza	Ike Mourar	Robert E. Lehmann	1 1/16 miles	1:42.60	$61,600		

Notes:
† In the 1987 running, Up The Apalachee, was first past the post but was disqualified and placed second. Very Subtle was declared the winner.

== See also ==
- Road to the Kentucky Oaks
- List of American and Canadian Graded races
