= 1978 Preakness Stakes =

103rd running of the Preakness Stakes

103rd Preakness Stakes
- The Preakness Stakes
- Location: Pimlico Race Course, Baltimore, Maryland, United States
- Date: May 20, 1978
- Winning horse: Affirmed
- Jockey: Steve Cauthen
- Conditions: Fast
- Surface: Dirt

The 1978 Preakness Stakes was the 103rd running of the $210,000 Grade 1 Preakness Stakes thoroughbred horse race. The race took place on May 20, 1978, and was televised in the United States on the ABC television network. Affirmed, who was jockeyed by Steve Cauthen, won the race by a head over runner-up Alydar, repeating Affirmed's close victory over Alydar in the Kentucky Derby. Believe It finished 3rd, repeating his result from the Kentucky Derby. Approximate post time was 5:41 p.m. Eastern Time. The race was run on a fast track in a final time of 1:54-2/5. The Maryland Jockey Club reported total attendance of 81,261, this is recorded as second highest on the list of American thoroughbred racing top attended events for North America in 1978.

Longshot Track reward took the lead early, but Affirmed took the lead entering the backstretch. Alydar had remained fairly close to the leaders and almost caught up to Affirmed entering the stretch. But Affirmed never let Alydar catch up, and won by a neck. 3rd place Believe It finished 7 1/2 lengths behind.

== Payout ==
The 103rd Preakness Stakes Payout Schedule

Program Number	Horse Name	Win	Place	Show
6	Affirmed	US$3.00	$2.10	$2.10
3	Alydar	-	$2.10	$2.10
2	Believe It	-	-	$2.10

$2 Exacta: (6–3) paid $4.00

== The full chart ==
Finish Position	Margin (lengths)	Post Position	Horse name	Jockey	Trainer	Owner	Post Time Odds	Purse Earnings
1st	0	6	Affirmed	Steve Cauthen	Laz Barrera	Harbor View Farm	0.50-1 favorite	$136,200
2nd	head	3	Alydar	Jorge Velásquez	John Veitch	Calumet Farm	1.80-1	$30,000
3rd	8	2	Believe It	Eddie Maple	Woody Stephens	Hickory Tree Stable	6.70-1	$15,000
4th	101/2	1	Noon Time Spender	Herberto Hinojosa	Antonio Arcordia	Miami Lakes Ranch	80.80-1	$7,500
5th	181/2	7	Indigo Star	Robert Fitzgerald	King T. Leatherbury	Raymond F. Procopio	89.80-1	
6th	261/2	5	Dax S.	Jack Kurtz	Melvin W. Gross	Nathan Scherr	93.30-1	
7th	301/2	4	Track Reward	Bernie Gonzalez	Albert S. Barrera	Aisquith Stable	88.70-1	

- Winning Breeder: Harbor View Farm; (FL)
- Winning Time: 1:54 2/5
- Track Condition: Fast
- Total Attendance: 81,261
