= Calumet Baking Powder Company =

Former American food company and current brand

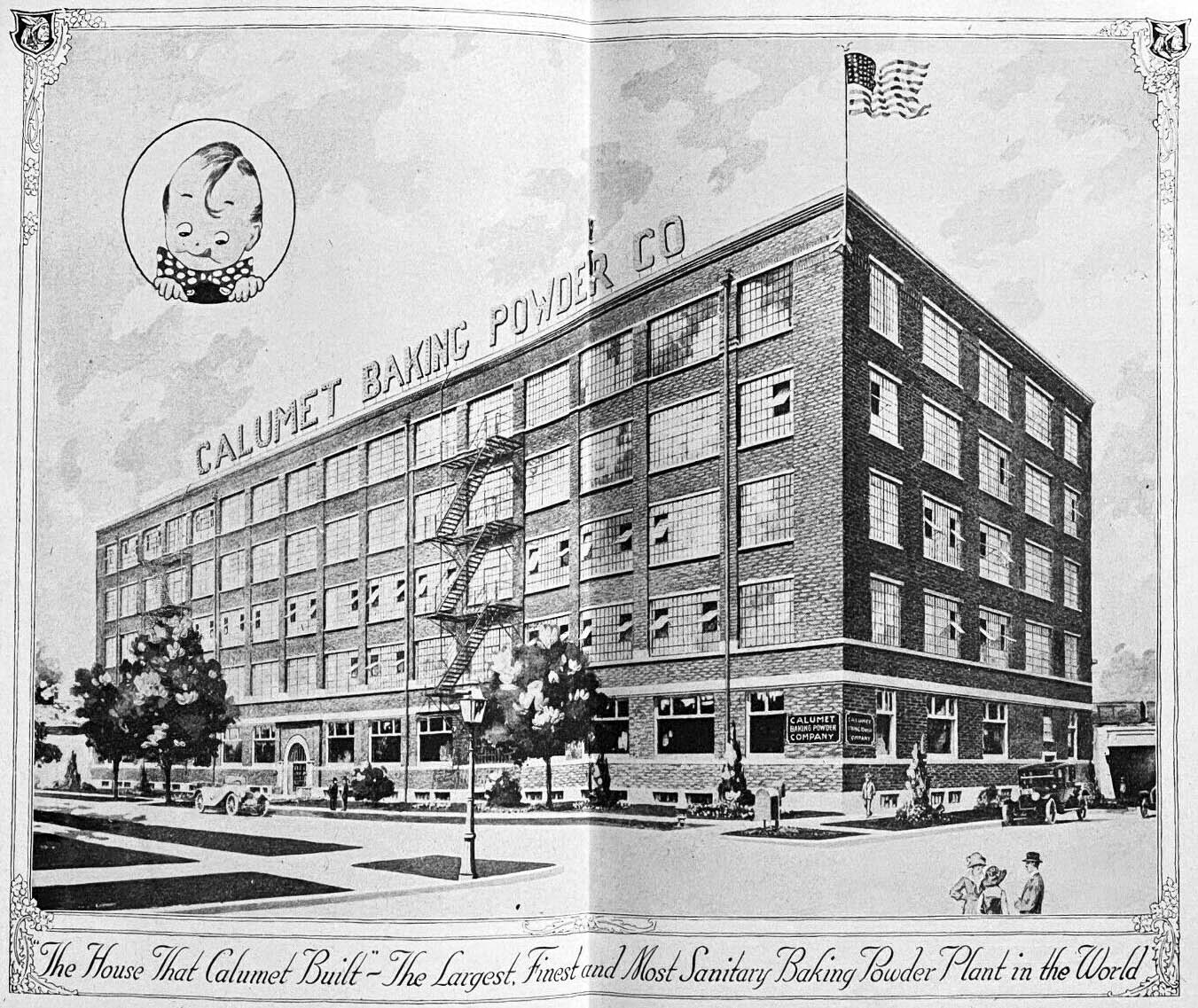
- Illustration of the Calumet factory in 1920
- Type: Private (1889–1929)
- Industry: Food
- Founded: 1889
- Founder: William Monroe Wright
- Fate: Acquired by General Foods, becoming a brand
- Key people: Warren Wright, Sr.
- Products: Baking powder
- Brands: Calumet

The Calumet Baking Powder Company was an American food company established in 1889 in Chicago, Illinois, by William Monroe Wright to manufacture baking powder. Calumet operated independently until it was acquired by General Foods in 1929.

As of April 2024, Calumet is a brand owned by Kraft Heinz whose baking powder is produced by its Kraft Foods division.

== Overview ==
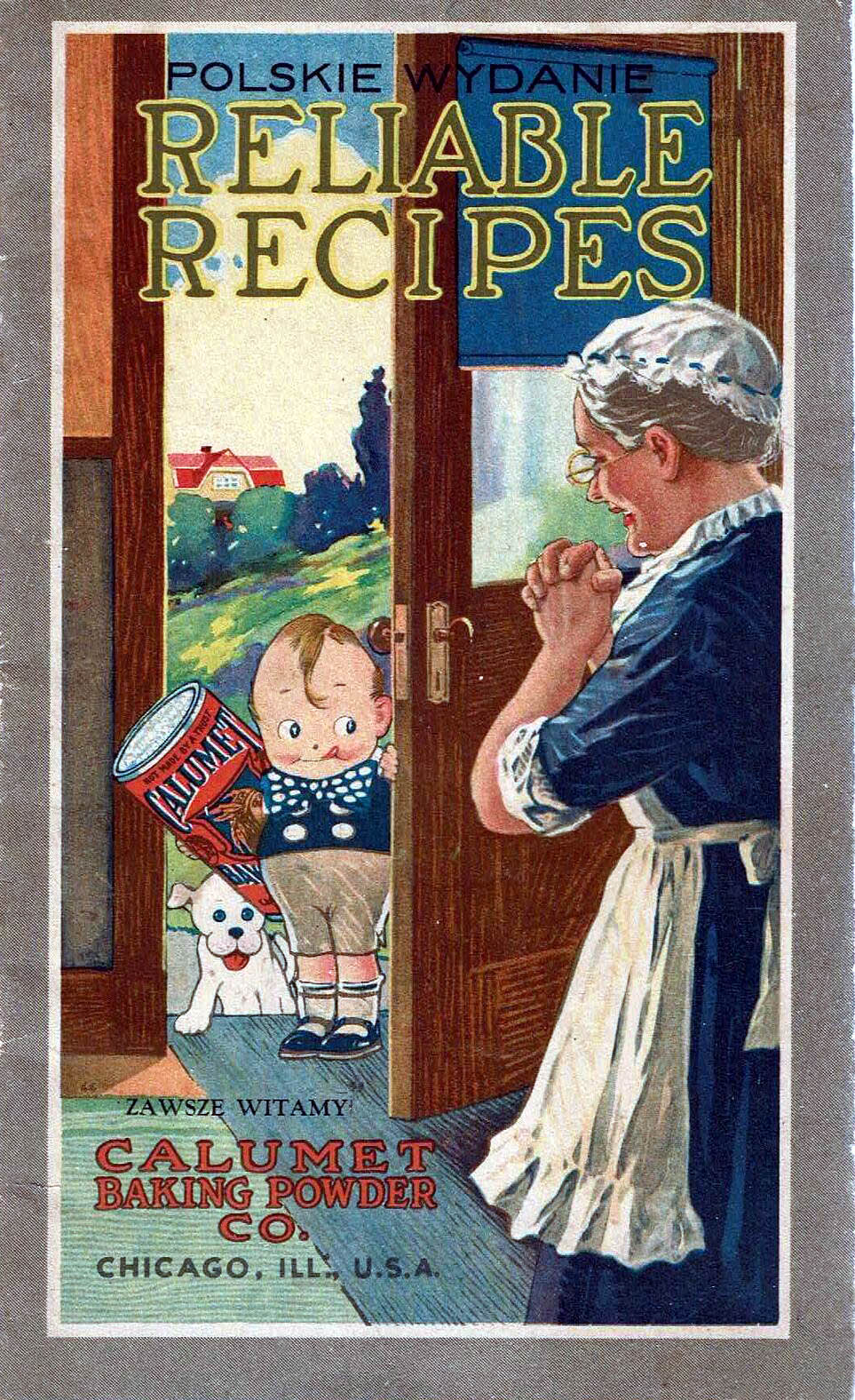
Cover of Calumet's Reliable Recipes brochure, 1920

Wright's newly formulated double-acting baking powder took its name from the French-derived, colonial-era word for a Native American ceremonial pipe, given to the lands now known as Calumet City, Illinois. Wright's company adopted a stylized Indian wearing a war bonnet as its trademark. The new baking powder formula replaced cream of tartar with aluminum phosphate and also included dried egg whites. This formula was created by Wright with the help of chemist George Campbell Rew.

In 1929, William Wright sold out to General Foods and the "Calumet" baking powder became one of its many name brands. Wright, a fan of horse racing, would use his wealth to build what would become a world-renowned horse breeding and training operation in Lexington, Kentucky, which he named Calumet Farm. It was later run by his son, Warren Wright. General Foods merged into Kraft Foods Inc. in 1990 and Calumet was added to the Kraft Foods' brand portfolio.

Cans of Calumet Baking Powder were used as props in the larder scenes of the 1980 film, The Shining. This detail is noted early in the 2012 documentary Room 237, as the catalyst for Bill Blakemore's theory that the film is an allegory for the mass dying of Native Americans following European colonization.
