= Sensitive Prince =

American-bred Thoroughbred racehorse

- Sire: Majestic Prince
- Grandsire: Raise A Native
- Dam: Sensitive Lady
- Damsire: Sensitivo
- Sex: Stallion
- Foaled: 1975
- Country: United States
- Colour: Bay
- Breeder: Joseph Taub
- Owner: Top the Marc Stable (Joseph Taub)
- Trainer: H. Allen Jerkens
- Record: 20: 14-1-2
- Earnings: $495,475

Major wins
- Hutcheson Stakes (1978); Fountain of Youth Stakes (1978); Lexington Stakes (1978); Hawthorne Derby (1978); Jerome Handicap (1978); Seminole Handicap (1979); Gulfstream Park Handicap (1979); Michigan Mile And One-Eighth Handicap (1979); Pennsylvania Governor's Cup Handicap (1979)

Sensitive Prince (April 1, 1975 – January 24, 1991) was an American Thoroughbred racehorse. Out of the mare Sensitive Lady, he was sired by U.S. Racing Hall of Fame inductee, Majestic Prince.

Sensitive Price had the misfortune of being born in the same year as two future Hall of Fame horses, that year's U.S. Triple Crown champion Affirmed and his prime challenger, Alydar.

As a three-year-old, Sensitive Prince won Kentucky Derby prep races in Florida and at Keeneland Race Course. In the 1978 Kentucky Derby, which he entered undefeated under jockey Mickey Solomone, he took the lead early and held it until the field turned for home before fading to finish sixth. Later that year, he finished second in record time to Affirmed in the Jim Dandy Stakes at Saratoga Race Course but won three important races including the Jerome Handicap at Belmont Park.

Racing at age four, Sensitive Prince got his first important win of 1979 in the Gulfstream Park Handicap, then added two handicap wins before being retired to stud at the end of the racing season, having set three track records during his career.

As a sire, Sensitive Prince stood for a time at Wimbledon Farm in Lexington, Kentucky. He met with modest success, siring six stakes winners.
