= Before Dawn (horse) =

American-bred Thoroughbred racehorse

- Sire: Raise a Cup
- Grandsire: Raise a Native
- Dam: Moonbeam
- Damsire: Tim Tam
- Sex: Filly
- Foaled: 1979
- Country: United States
- Colour: Bay
- Breeder: Calumet Farm
- Owner: Calumet Farm
- Trainer: John M. Veitch
- Record: 14: 9-2-1
- Earnings: US$432,855

Major wins
- Astarita Stakes (1981); Fashion Stakes (1981); Matron Stakes (1981); Spinaway Stakes (1981); Fair Grounds Oaks (1982); Hibiscus Stakes (1982)

Awards
- American Champion Two-Year-Old Filly (1981)
- Last updated on December 20, 2011

Before Dawn (1979–2006) was an American Champion racehorse bred and raced by Lucille Markey's Calumet Farm of Lexington, Kentucky.

== Racing career ==
Trained by future U.S. Racing Hall of Fame inductee, John Veitch, in 1981 she was voted the American Champion Two-Year-Old Filly. During her two-year-old campaign, Before Dawn won five of her six starts against other fillies and finished second to her male counterpart in the Champagne Stakes. At age three in 1982, she won her first four starts before finishing third and second in her first Grade I competitions of the year.

== Broodmare ==
Retired to broodmare duty, Before Dawn was sent to breeders in Ireland in 1990. She died in 2006 having produced three stakes-placed runners from eleven foals to race.
