= John M. Veitch =

American horse trainer (1945–2023)

John Veitch
Personal information
- Born: June 27, 1945 Lexington, Kentucky, U.S.
- Died: February 14, 2023 (aged 77) Lexington, Kentucky, U.S.
- Occupation: Trainer

Horse racing career
- Sport: Horse racing
- Career wins: 410

Major racing wins
- Alabama Stakes (1977); Champagne Stakes (1977); Coaching Club American Oaks (1977, 1979); Delaware Handicap (1977); Fantasy Stakes (1977, 1979); Great American Stakes (1977); Test Stakes (1977); Tremont Stakes (1977, 1978); Arlington Classic (1978); Blue Grass Stakes (1978); Cowdin Stakes (1978); Flamingo Stakes (1978); Florida Derby (1978, 1985, 1988); Juvenile Stakes (1978); Travers Stakes (1978); Whitney Handicap (1978); Acorn Stakes (1979); Black-Eyed Susan Stakes (1979); Bonnie Miss Stakes (1979); Kentucky Oaks (1979); Mother Goose Stakes (1979, 1980); Roamer Handicap (1979); Ashland Stakes (1980); Ballerina Stakes (1980); Cotillion Handicap (1980); Fashion Stakes (1981); Matron Stakes (1981); Spinaway Stakes (1981); Metropolitan Handicap (1983); Remsen Stakes (1983); Flower Bowl Invitational Stakes (1985); Fountain of Youth Stakes (1985); Peter Pan Stakes (1985); Lake Placid Stakes (1987, 1988); Queen Elizabeth II Challenge Cup Stakes (1987, 1988, 1990); Sheepshead Bay Stakes (1987, 1989); Jim Dandy Stakes (1988); Lexington Stakes (1988); Man o' War Stakes (1988); Turf Classic Stakes (1988); Washington, D.C. International Stakes (1988); Black Helen Handicap (1989); Nashua Stakes (1990); Yellow Ribbon Stakes (1990); Diana Stakes (1992); New York Stakes (1992) Breeders' Cup wins: Breeders' Cup Classic (1985)

Honors
- National Museum of Racing and Hall of Fame (2007)

Significant horses
- Alydar, Before Dawn, Brian's Time, Davona Dale, Our Mims, Proud Truth, Sunshine Forever

John M. Veitch (June 27, 1945 – February 14, 2023) was an American Hall of Fame Thoroughbred horse trainer. The son of U.S. Racing Hall of Fame trainer Sylvester Veitch, he belonged to a family that has been in the horse-training business for three generations.

Veitch studied at Bradley University in Peoria, Illinois, where he played fullback on the university's football team.

From the beginning of his training career in 1974 through the end of 2003, Veitch won 410 races out of 2,340 starts and his horses earned $20,097,980. He began as an assistant with his father as well as for trainer Elliott Burch at Rokeby Stables before going on his own in 1974. In 1976, he accepted the job as head trainer for Lucille Markey's Calumet Farm where he remained until late 1982. He then trained horses for John W. Galbreath of Darby Dan Farm plus Brian's Time for Jodie and Wally Phillips, Galbreath's sister and brother-in-law. For a time in the early 1980s, he additionally handled the training for the stable of Frances A. Genter. In 1998, he closed his small public stable and took the job of racing consultant to a member of Saudi Arabia's royal family. He returned to the United States in April 2000 and trained for Calumet Farm's new owner Henryk deKwiatkowski in 2001.

Before retiring in 2003, he spent 2002 training for John Ed Anthony's newly formed Shortleaf Stable.

During his career, Veitch trained four champions:

- Our Mims - American Champion Three-Year-Old Filly of 1977.
- Davona Dale, American Champion Three-Year-Old Filly of 1978, won all the races associated with the old and later versions of the Filly Triple Crown of Thoroughbred Racing, taking the Kentucky Oaks, Black-Eyed Susan Stakes, Acorn Stakes, Mother Goose Stakes, and Coaching Club American Oaks.
- Before Dawn - wins include the Spinaway Stakes, and Matron Stakes. Voted American Champion Two-Year-Old Filly of 1981.
- Sunshine Forever won the Washington, D.C. International Stakes and the Turf Classic Invitational Stakes, and was the American Champion Male Turf Horse in 1988.

Veitch was also the trainer of Hall of Fame inductee Alydar. Famous for his battles with Affirmed in the 1978 U.S. Triple Crown races, during his racing career Alydar defeated Affirmed three times, notably in the 1977 Champagne Stakes and because of disqualification in the 1978 Travers Stakes. Alydar also won the Flamingo Stakes, Blue Grass Stakes, and the Arlington Classic. He took the Whitney Handicap by 10 lengths.

In 1985, Veitch's horse Proud Truth won the Breeders' Cup Classic.

Veitch retired from training in 2003. He held the position of chief state steward of the Kentucky Horseracing Authority. In 2007, he was elected to the United States' Racing Hall of Fame. He died in Lexington, Kentucky, on February 14, 2023, at the age of 77.
