= Our Mims =

American-bred Thoroughbred racehorse

- Sire: Herbager
- Grandsire: Vandale
- Dam: Sweet Tooth
- Damsire: On-and-On
- Sex: Mare
- Foaled: 1974
- Country: United States
- Colour: Bay
- Breeder: Calumet Farm
- Owner: Calumet Farm (while racing)
- Trainer: John M. Veitch
- Record: 18: 6-6-1
- Earnings: $368,034

Major wins
- Fantasy Stakes (1977); Coaching Club American Oaks (1977); Alabama Stakes (1977); Delaware Handicap (1977)

Awards
- U.S. Champion 3-Yr-Old Filly (1977)

Honours
- Our Mims Retirement Haven - Paris, Kentucky
- Last updated on October 15, 2006

Our Mims (March 8, 1974 – December 9, 2003) was a champion Thoroughbred racing mare and broodmare, yet she came very close to dying abandoned in a field of cattle.

== Background ==
Our Mims was foaled on March 8, 1974, at Calumet Farm in Lexington, Kentucky. She was by Herbager out of Sweet Tooth (by On-and-On). This made her a half sister to the brilliant colt Alydar, who gained fame for his rivalry with the 1978 Triple Crown winner, Affirmed. Our Mims was named after Melinda Markey, the daughter of Rear Admiral Gene Markey, second husband of Calumet Farm owner Lucille Markey.

Alydar and Our Mims were both owned by Calumet and trained by John M. Veitch.

== Racing career ==
Our Mims lost each of her seven starts as a two-year-old. When she was three, Veitch entered her in an allowance at Florida's Hialeah Park, which she won. Then she won the Fantasy Stakes at Oaklawn Park, the Coaching Club American Oaks at Belmont Park (at which Melinda Bena [nee Markey] was present to accept the winner's trophy on behalf of Calumet Farm), the prestigious Alabama Stakes at the Saratoga Race Course, and the Delaware Handicap at Delaware Park. Our Mims' performances earned her the Eclipse Award for the champion three-year-old filly. During this season, CBS sportscaster, Jimmy the Greek commented that "the only horse that could beat 1977 Kentucky Derby champion Seattle Slew was Calumet Farm's Our Mims."

At the end of her racing career of 18 starts, she had six wins, placed in six starts, and was third once. She earned $368,034.

== Broodmare ==
The foals of Our Mims did not do much on the track, but they were superior producers. Our Mims' first foal, Heavenly Blue by Raise a Native, produced Play On and On, who was the dam of several stakes winners, including Continuously, sent to England and then on to California to win a major race there. Her third foal was Mimbet, the dam of the 1997 Breeders' Cup Sprint winner, Elmhurst.

Our Mims came up barren when she turned twenty-one. Attempts to breed her for the next five years brought fruitless results. The champion was left in a cattle field to fend for herself. She ate whatever she could find in the field with no protection from the weather and no vet care.

== Rescue ==
Our Mims was saved by a woman named Jeanne Mirabito, who found her and brought her food. Two years later, after continued personal care of the mare, Mirabito convinced the owners to donate the ailing old horse to ReRun, Kentucky's first-ever Thoroughbred adoption program. Following ReRun's intensive rehabilitation that included long-overdue vet care and a proper feeding regimen, Jeanne adopted Our Mims. Our Mims lived in comfort until her death on December 9, 2003, at the age of twenty-nine. She is buried at Calumet's equine cemetery, the first horse buried in the cemetery who was not owned by the farm.

In tribute to the horse, Jeanne Mirabito created Our Mims Retirement Haven, a rescue farm specializing in the care of retired Thoroughbred broodmares, on her farm in Paris, KY. With the creed, "Specializing in restoring health and spirit in aged mares," OMRH's first mare was Our Mims' half-sister, Sugar and Spice. With the help of Cheryl Bellucci acting as the Haven's Director of Fund Raising and Promotion, the Haven achieved nonprofit status on March 8, 2007.
