= 1978 Prix de l'Arc de Triomphe =

57th Prix de l'Arc de Triomphe
- Prix de l'Arc de Triomphe
- Location: Longchamp, Paris, France
- Date: 1 October 1978
- Distance: 2,400 metres (1.5 mi)
- Winning horse: Alleged (IRE)
- Winning time: 2:36.1
- Final odds: 14/10 favourite
- Jockey: Lester Piggott
- Trainer: Vincent O'Brien
- Owner: Robert Sangster

The 1978 Prix de l'Arc de Triomphe was a horse race held at Longchamp on Sunday 1 October 1978. It was the 57th running of the Prix de l'Arc de Triomphe.

The winner was Alleged, a four-year-old colt trained in Ireland by Vincent O'Brien and ridden by Lester Piggott. Alleged, the 14/10 favourite, defeated the mare Trillion by two lengths, with Dancing Maid a further two lengths back in third. Alleged became the sixth horse to win the race twice after Ksar, Motrico, Corrida, Tantieme and Ribot. The winning time was 2:36.1.

== Race details ==
- Sponsor: none
- Purse:
- Going: Dead
- Distance: 2,400 metres
- Number of runners: 18
- Winner's time: 2:36.1

== Full result ==
Pos.	Marg.	Horse	Age	Jockey	Trainer (Country)
1		Alleged	4	Lester Piggott	Vincent O'Brien (IRE)
2	2	Trillion	4	Willie Shoemaker	Maurice Zilber (FR)
3	2	Dancing Maid	3	Freddy Head	Alec Head (FR)
4	3/4	Frere Basile	3	Philippe Paquet	Bernard Secly (FR)
5	1/2	Guadanini	4	Henri Samani	Robert Carver (FR)
6	hd	Montcontour	4	J-L Kessas	Maurice Zilber (FR)
7	1 1/2	Noir et Or	3	Maurice Philipperon	John Cunnington, Jr (FR)
8	2 1/3	Gay Mecene	3	Jean-Claude Desaint	Alec Head (FR)
9	3/4	Dancing Master	3	Gerard Dubroeucq	J P Gallorini (FR)
10	1 1/2	Lido	5	Albert Klimscha, Jr	C Seiffert (GER)
11	nk	Julio Mariner	3	Edward Hide	Clive Brittain (GB)
12	hd	Acamas	3	Yves Saint-Martin	François Mathet (FR)
13	1	Monseigneur	4	Tony Murray	François Boutin (FR)
14	hd	Turville	3	Alfred Gibert	Aage Paus (FR)
15	nk	Shafaraz	5	M Planard	Patrick Biancone (FR)
16	shd	Galiani	3	Alain Lequeux	Maurice Zilber (FR)
17	2	Exdirectory	3	Willie Carson	Paddy Prendergast (IRE)
18	6	Dom Alaric	4	Alain Badel	Olivier Douieb (FR)

* Abbreviations: ns = nose; shd = short-head; hd = head; snk = short neck; nk = neck

== Winner's details ==
Further details of the winner, Alleged.

- Sex: Colt
- Foaled: 4 May 1974
- Country: United States
- Sire: Hoist The Flag; Dam: Princess Pout (Prince John)
- Owner: Robert Sangster
- Breeder: June McKnight
