= Davona Dale =

American-bred Thoroughbred racehorse

- Sire: Best Turn
- Grandsire: Turn-To
- Dam: Royal Entrance
- Damsire: Tim Tam
- Sex: Mare
- Foaled: 1976
- Country: United States
- Colour: Bay
- Breeder: Calumet Farm
- Owner: Calumet Farm
- Trainer: John M. Veitch
- Record: 18: 11-2-1
- Earnings: $641,612

Major wins
- Holly Stakes (1978); Kentucky Oaks (1979); Coaching Club American Oaks (1979); Acorn Stakes (1979); Mother Goose Stakes (1979); Fantasy Stakes (1979); Black-Eyed Susan Stakes (1979); Bonnie Miss Stakes (1979); Ballerina Handicap (1980)

Awards
- U.S. Champion 3-Yr-Old Filly (1979); 5th U.S. Filly Triple Crown Champion (1979)

Honours
- United States Racing Hall of Fame (1985) #90 - Top 100 U.S. Racehorses of the 20th Century; Fair Grounds Racing Hall of Fame (2003); Davona Dale Stakes at Gulfstream Park (1988–); Davona Dale Stakes at Fair Grounds (1982–2000)
- Last updated on 16 February 2022

Davona Dale (1976–1997) was an American Hall of Fame Champion Thoroughbred racehorse.

== Background ==
Owned and bred by Calumet Farm, her sire descends from Nearco and her damsire is Hall of Famer Tim Tam who won the Kentucky Derby and Preakness Stakes.

== Racing career ==
Racing at age two, Davona Dale won once and finished off the board in the other but at age three, dominated American filly races. In 1979, Davona Dale won eight straight races and became the only filly in American thoroughbred history to win both the National Triple Tiara (the three feature filly races on thoroughbred racing's Triple Crown weekend) and the New York Triple Tiara of Thoroughbred Racing. She won the national triple by sweeping the Kentucky Oaks at Churchill Downs, the Black-Eyed Susan Stakes (now the George E. Mitchell Stakes) at Pimlico Race Course and the Acorn Stakes at Belmont Park. Her second triple occurred all at Belmont Park when she won the Acorn Stakes, the Mother Goose Stakes and the Coaching Club American Oaks. Her performances earned her the 1979 Eclipse Award for Outstanding 3-Year-Old Filly. That season, she also ran in the Travers Stakes against Colts. She finished fourth.

At age 4, ankle and tendon injuries limited Davona Dale to just three races out of which she won the Ballerina Handicap before being retired to broodmare duties at Calumet Farm.

== Broodmare career ==
As a broodmare, Davona Dale produced 12 foals, of which nine started and six won. Her most successful foal was her 1986 colt Le Voyageur (by Seattle Slew), who raced in both the US and France, and finished third behind Easy Goer and Sunday Silence in the 1989 Belmont Stakes. Additionally, her 1989 filly Polish Maid (by Danzig) is the second dam of 2012 Del Mar Debutante and Chandelier Stakes winner Executiveprivilege.

Prior to the 1993 breeding season, Davona Dale was exported to Ireland. She died there in 1997 of foaling complications while attempting to deliver her colt Cema (by Lake Coniston), who was rescued from her womb and survived.

== Honors ==
In 1985, Davona Dale was inducted into the United States' National Museum of Racing and Hall of Fame. In 2003 she inducted into the Fair Grounds Racing Hall of Fame. The Grade II Davona Dale Stakes, part of the Road to the Kentucky Oaks, is named in her honor.

== Pedigree ==
Pedigree of Davona Dale(USA), bay mare, 1976
| Sire Best Turn dk.b/br. 1966 (USA) | Turn-to b. 1951 (IRE) | Royal Charger (GB) | Nearco (ITY) |
| Sire Best Turn dk.b/br. 1966 (USA) | Turn-to b. 1951 (IRE) | Royal Charger (GB) | Sun Princess (GB) |
| Sire Best Turn dk.b/br. 1966 (USA) | Turn-to b. 1951 (IRE) | Source Sucree (FR) | Admiral Drake (FR) |
| Sire Best Turn dk.b/br. 1966 (USA) | Turn-to b. 1951 (IRE) | Source Sucree (FR) | Lavendula (FR) |
| Sire Best Turn dk.b/br. 1966 (USA) | Sweet Clementine b. 1960 (USA) | Swaps (USA) | Khaled (GB) |
| Sire Best Turn dk.b/br. 1966 (USA) | Sweet Clementine b. 1960 (USA) | Swaps (USA) | Iron Reward (USA) |
| Sire Best Turn dk.b/br. 1966 (USA) | Sweet Clementine b. 1960 (USA) | Miz Clementine (USA) | Bull Lea (USA) |
| Sire Best Turn dk.b/br. 1966 (USA) | Sweet Clementine b. 1960 (USA) | Miz Clementine (USA) | Two Bob (USA) |
| Dam Royal Entrance b. 1965 (USA) | Tim Tam b. 1955 (USA) | Tom Fool (USA) | Menow (USA) |
| Dam Royal Entrance b. 1965 (USA) | Tim Tam b. 1955 (USA) | Tom Fool (USA) | Gaga (USA) |
| Dam Royal Entrance b. 1965 (USA) | Tim Tam b. 1955 (USA) | Two Lea (USA) | Bull Lea (USA) |
| Dam Royal Entrance b. 1965 (USA) | Tim Tam b. 1955 (USA) | Two Lea (USA) | Two Bob (USA) |
| Dam Royal Entrance b. 1965 (USA) | Princess Gate b. 1957 (USA) | Sun Again (USA) | Sun Teddy (USA) |
| Dam Royal Entrance b. 1965 (USA) | Princess Gate b. 1957 (USA) | Sun Again (USA) | Hug Again (USA) |
| Dam Royal Entrance b. 1965 (USA) | Princess Gate b. 1957 (USA) | Siena Way (USA) | Bull Lea (USA) |
| Dam Royal Entrance b. 1965 (USA) | Princess Gate b. 1957 (USA) | Siena Way (USA) | Hydroplane (GB) (Family: 3-l) |

Inbreeding:

- Bull Lea: S4 x M4 x M4
- Two Bob: S4 x M4
