= Gene Markey =

American film producer (1895–1980)

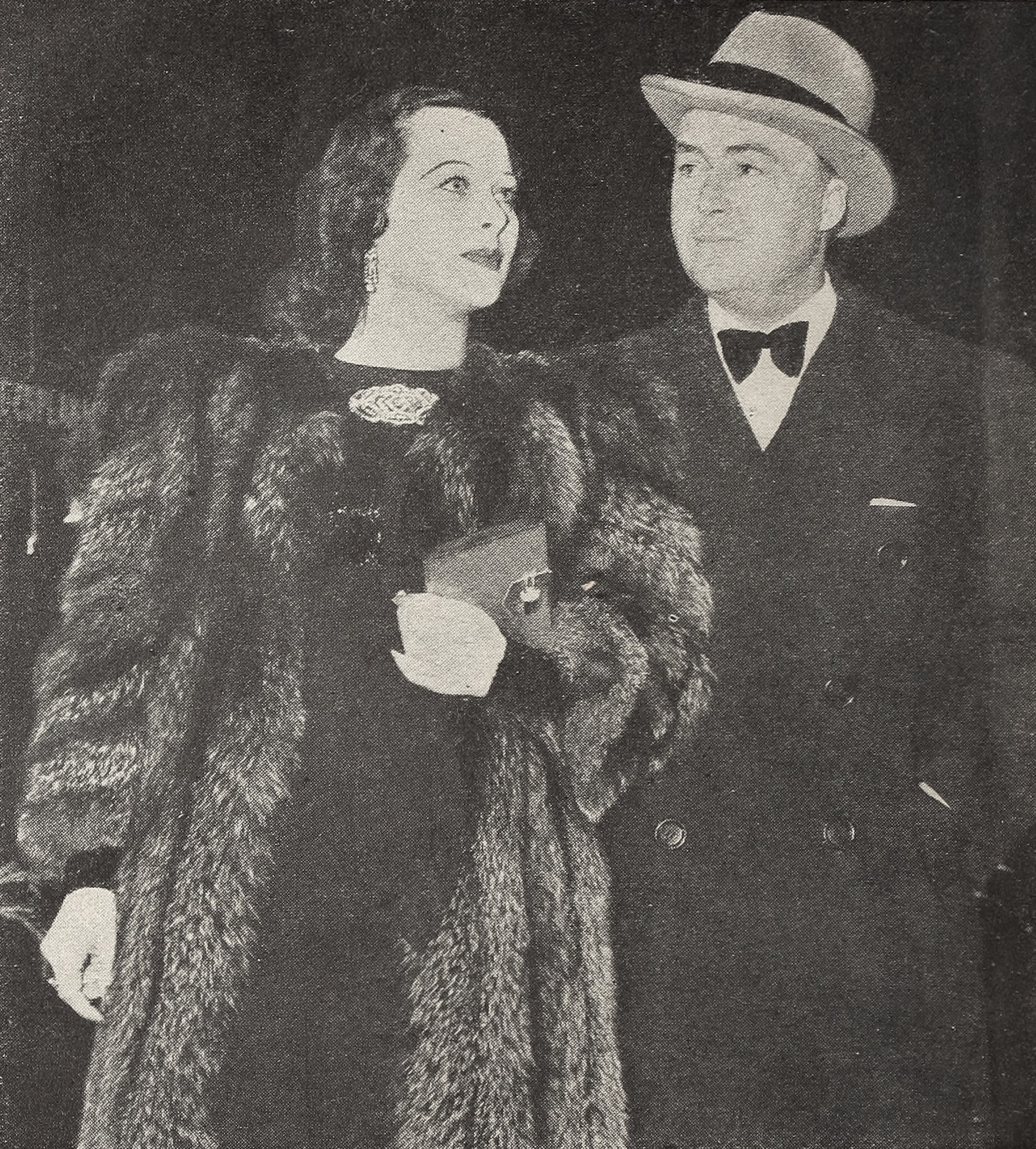
- Hedy Lamarr and Gene Markey, 1939
- Born: Eugene Willford Markey; December 11, 1895; Jackson, Michigan, U.S.
- Died: May 1, 1980 (aged 84); Miami Beach, Florida, U.S.
- Resting place: Lexington Cemetery
- Spouses: Joan Bennett (m. 1932; div. 1937) Hedy Lamarr (m. 1939; div. 1941) Myrna Loy (m. 1946; div. 1950) Lucille Parker Wright (m. 1952)
- Children: 1
- Military career
- Allegiance: United States
- Branch: United States Army; United States Navy
- Service years: 1918, 1920–56 (37 years)
- Rank: Lieutenant (Army); Rear Admiral (Navy)
- Conflicts: World War I: Battle of Belleau Wood; World War II: Battle of Guadalcanal
- Awards: Legion of Merit; Bronze Star w/Combat "V"; Legion of Honor (France); Star of Solidarity (Italy); Navy Commendation Medal

Eugene Willford "Gene" Markey (December 11, 1895 – May 1, 1980) was an American writer, producer, and screenwriter. During World War II, he served in the US Navy, reaching the rank of Rear Admiral and becoming a highly decorated officer.

His first three marriages were to actresses and each had short time spans. In 1952 he married Lucille Parker Wright, widow of the owner of Calumet Farms, and their marriage lasted to his death. With her he entered the world of thoroughbred horse racing in Lexington, Kentucky, and became known for his parties and friendships.

== Biography ==
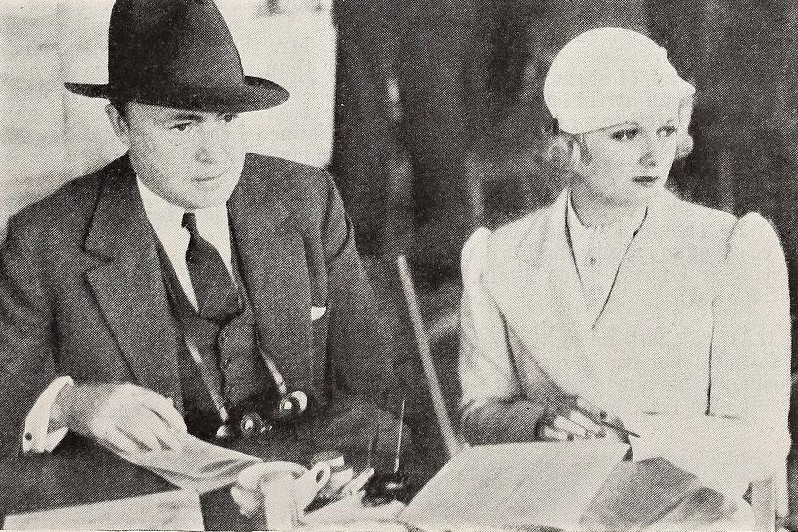
Gene Markey and Joan Bennett, 1933

=== Early life ===
Markey was born in Michigan. His father, Eugene Lawrence Markey, was a colonel in the United States Army. His uncle, Daniel P. Markey, had been Speaker of the Michigan House of Representatives. Markey graduated from Dartmouth College in 1918.

=== Chicago ===
He was a skilled sketch artist, which gained him entry, after World War I, into the Art Institute of Chicago in 1919; he finished in 1920. He claimed to have "studied painting and learned nothing" there.

After that, he worked as a journalist in Chicago for several newspapers and magazines, including Photoplay magazine. It was during the 1920s that Gene Markey became a writer, specializing in novels about the Jazz Age. Among his titles were Anabel; Stepping High; Women, Women, Everywhere; and His Majesty's Pyjamas. His book Literary Lights (March 1923, Alfred A. Knopf, New York) was a collection of fifty caricatures of important literary authors of the day.

=== Hollywood ===
He went to Hollywood in 1929 and became a screenwriter for Twentieth Century Fox. His screen credits included King of Burlesque (1936) starring Alice Faye, Girls' Dormitory (1936) featuring Herbert Marshall, and On the Avenue (1937), starring Dick Powell, Madeleine Carroll, and Alice Faye. He was also the producer of the 1937 Shirley Temple film, Wee Willie Winkie, among others.

Although he was not overly handsome, he was a very skilled conversationalist and he quickly became a popular fixture in Hollywood society. Among his good friends in Hollywood were producer John Hay Whitney, composer Irving Berlin, and actors Douglas Fairbanks Jr., Ward Bond and John Wayne. He would often go fishing with Bond and Wayne off Catalina Island, California. A 1946 article in the Washington Times Herald said, "Other Men Say: What's Gene Markey Got That We Haven't Got?" The article ran a photo of Rudolph Valentino with the caption, "NOT SO HOT – By Comparison. Though all American womanhood swooned over him in his day, Rudolph Valentino was no Markey." Soon after he arrived in Hollywood in 1929, it was also reported that, "Markey became the most sought after unattached man in the cinema firmament, so sprinkled with far handsomer, richer male stars." Markey was married three times to prominent film actresses. His first marriage, to Joan Bennett, from 1932 to 1937, produced a daughter, Melinda, in 1934. He was married to Hedy Lamarr from 1939 to 1940 and to Myrna Loy from 1946 to 1950. At first, Loy claimed mental cruelty, but later retracted it, saying, "He could make a scrubwoman think she was a queen and he could make a queen think she was the queen of queens."

=== Military career ===
After his graduation from Dartmouth, Markey became a lieutenant in the infantry during World War I (which the United States had entered in 1917) and saw action at the Battle of Belleau Wood. He then joined the U.S. Naval Reserve in 1920, and it was during World War II that he made his greatest mark. In August 1941, he reported to Balboa, Panama, with the rank of lieutenant commander. He had a yacht, Melinda (named after his daughter), that he donated to the United States Navy for use as a submarine chaser. During the war, Markey rose to the rank of commodore and served as an assistant intelligence officer on the staff of Fleet Admiral William "Bull" Halsey at Guadalcanal. After the war, he was promoted to rear admiral and he officially retired from the Navy on February 27, 1956. He was highly decorated; among his awards were the Legion of Merit, Bronze Star with Combat V (for leading a reconnaissance mission in the Solomon Islands in 1942), a Navy Commendation Medal, Italy's Star of Solidarity, and France's Legion of Honor. During World War II, Markey became good friends with Louis Mountbatten, 1st Earl Mountbatten of Burma. After the war, he became a special assistant to United States Secretary of the Navy James Forrestal. Markey was very proud of his admiral's commission. He insisted on being called "Admiral Markey", never "Mister Markey" and, rarely, "Gene". For the rest of his life, he would promptly toss any mail (including bills) that wasn't addressed to Admiral Markey into the trash.

=== Later life ===
He returned to Hollywood after the war. On September 27, 1952, he married his fourth wife, Lucille Parker Wright, the widow of Warren Wright, owner of the Calumet Farm racing stable. Markey left California after this marriage.

He became fond of naming some of the farm's annual crop of foals. His first was a filly, named Our Mims after his daughter Melinda. Another filly was named Myrtle Morgan, after the two streets that intersected in front of his property in Saratoga Springs, New York. He named a colt Eastern Fleet (possibly named as a tribute to his service in the Navy); it finished fourth in the 1971 Kentucky Derby and second in the Preakness Stakes.

Markey also loved dogs; he owned a black Labrador Retriever named Lucky that lived to the unusually old age of 17. Mrs. Markey also had a dog, a Yorkshire Terrier named Timmy Tammy. (She was thought to have named one of Calumet Farm's colts as Tim Tam, after her dog. The horse became a champion.) Mrs. Markey carried her small dog with her in her purse everywhere she went.

Shortly after this marriage, Markey became good friends with Ralph Wilson, who later was founder and owner of the Buffalo Bills of the National Football League.

One of Mrs. Markey's hobbies was collecting statues of eagles. In late 18th century Kentucky, eagles had been widely believed to be a symbol of good luck.

Dividing his time between Lexington, Kentucky, Saratoga Springs, New York, and Miami Beach, Florida (with an occasional trip to Europe thrown in), Markey continued to write. Among his works during this period were: Kentucky Pride, an adventure–romance set in Civil War Kentucky; and That Far Paradise, a story of an 18th-century family making its way from Virginia to settle in what later became Kentucky. As background research for his latter book, Markey reenacted the journey himself.

Markey was very fond of the time he spent in Kentucky, quickly becoming a fixture on its social scene. He became good friends with many members of the thoroughbred racing community. He once told a reporter, "I cannot restrain my ardor for the place and its people...No duck ever took to water as I have taken to Kentucky."

Markey was a noted party giver. One of his specialties was a tropical punch made with an unknown number of rums. At his parties, his old friends from Hollywood often mixed with his new friends from Kentucky.

While he lived in Kentucky, he purchased an old 18th-century log cabin and had it moved to the Calumet Farm property, where he would use it as his writing room. He had two brands of private reserve bourbon distilled that he named "Old Commodore" (as a tribute to his service in the U.S. Navy) and "Old Calumet Cabin" (after his writing room).

On July 31, 1958, Admiral Markey was commissioned as a Kentucky Colonel (a ceremonial rank) by Governor Albert Benjamin "Happy" Chandler Sr. Markey served as the model for the character played by Burgess Meredith in the 1965 film In Harm's Way, starring his good friend John Wayne.

Admiral and Mrs. Markey remained married until his death in 1980. He was buried in the Lexington Cemetery in Lexington, Kentucky. His widow Lucille was buried next to him upon her death in 1982.

== Selected filmography ==
- Lucky in Love (1929)
- Mother's Boy (1929)
- West of Broadway (1931)
- Luxury Liner (1933)
- Let's Live Tonight (1935)
- Private Number (1936)
- The Big Noise (1936)
- Josette (1938)

== Sources ==
- Wild Ride, Anne Hagedorn Auerbach, New York, Henry Holt and Company, LLC, 1994
- The Bennetts: An Acting Family, Brian Kellow, Lexington, The University Press of Kentucky, 2004
