= Alydar =

American-bred Thoroughbred racehorse

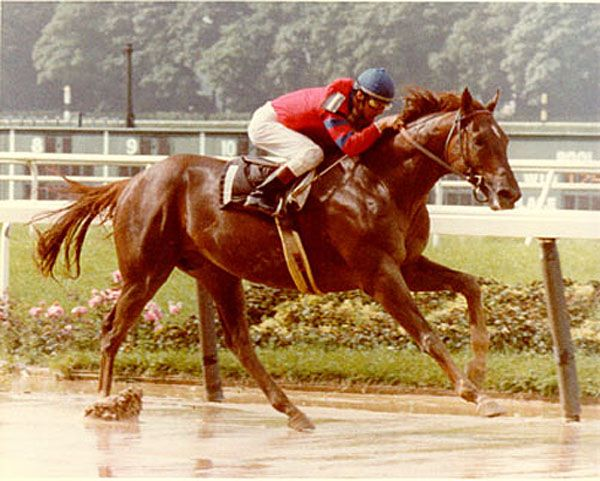
- Sire: Raise a Native
- Grandsire: Native Dancer
- Dam: Sweet Tooth
- Damsire: On-and-On
- Sex: Stallion
- Foaled: 1975
- Country: USA
- Colour: Chestnut
- Breeder: Calumet Farm
- Owner: Calumet Farm
- Trainer: John M. Veitch
- Record: 26:14-9-1
- Earnings: $957,195

Major wins
- Great American Stakes (1977); Champagne Stakes (1977); Tremont Stakes (1977); Flamingo Stakes (1978); Florida Derby (1978); Blue Grass Stakes (1978); Arlington Classic Stakes (1978); Travers Stakes (1978); Whitney Handicap (1978); Nassau County Handicap (1979) American Classic Race placing: Kentucky Derby 2nd (1978); Preakness Stakes 2nd (1978); Belmont Stakes 2nd (1978)

Awards
- Leading sire in North America (1990)

Honours
- United States Racing Hall of Fame (1989) #27 on the Top 100 U.S. Racehorses of the 20th Century; Alydar Stakes at Hollywood Park; Alydar Stakes at Saratoga Race Course
- Last updated on June 26, 2011

Alydar (March 23, 1975 – November 15, 1990) was an American Thoroughbred race horse and sire. A chestnut colt, he was most famous for finishing a close second to Affirmed in all three races of the 1978 Triple Crown. With each successive race, Alydar narrowed Affirmed's margin of victory; Affirmed won by 1.5 lengths in the Kentucky Derby, by a neck in the Preakness and by a head in the Belmont Stakes. Alydar has been described as the best horse in the history of Thoroughbred racing never to have won a championship. Alydar's fame continued when he got older. He died under suspicious circumstances.

== Racing career ==
Trained by John M. Veitch (who also trained Alydar's half-sister, Eclipse Award winning Our Mims) and ridden by jockey Jorge Velásquez, in 1978 Alydar dueled with Affirmed in all three legs of the Triple Crown. He lost to his arch-rival by a combined total of less than two lengths across the three legs. The 1978 Belmont Stakes, the third (and final) leg of the series, is considered by many as one of the most exciting races in the history of the sport. In that race, Alydar and Affirmed dueled side by side from the middle of the far turn all the way to the wire, with Affirmed barely holding on to win by a head to claim the Triple Crown.

In his racing career Alydar won 14 of 26 starts, finishing second 9 times and third once, and earned purses totalling $957,195. He raced against Affirmed ten times in his career, winning thrice. Alydar was inducted into the National Museum of Racing and Hall of Fame in 1989. In the Blood-Horse magazine ranking of the top 100 U.S. thoroughbred champions of the 20th Century, Alydar was ranked #27.

== At stud ==
Alydar was a major success as a stallion. His offspring include Hall of Fame Eclipse Award champion Easy Goer; Alysheba, winner of the Kentucky Derby, Preakness Stakes and the Breeders' Cup Classic; Kandaly, 1994 Louisiana Derby winner; Turkoman, Strike the Gold, Criminal Type, Althea, Alydaress, Benchmark, Stella Madrid, and Miss Oceana. He is also the broodmare sire of Peintre Celebre, Cat Thief, Anees, Ajina, Aly's Alley, Gio Ponti, and Lure.

== Suspicious death ==
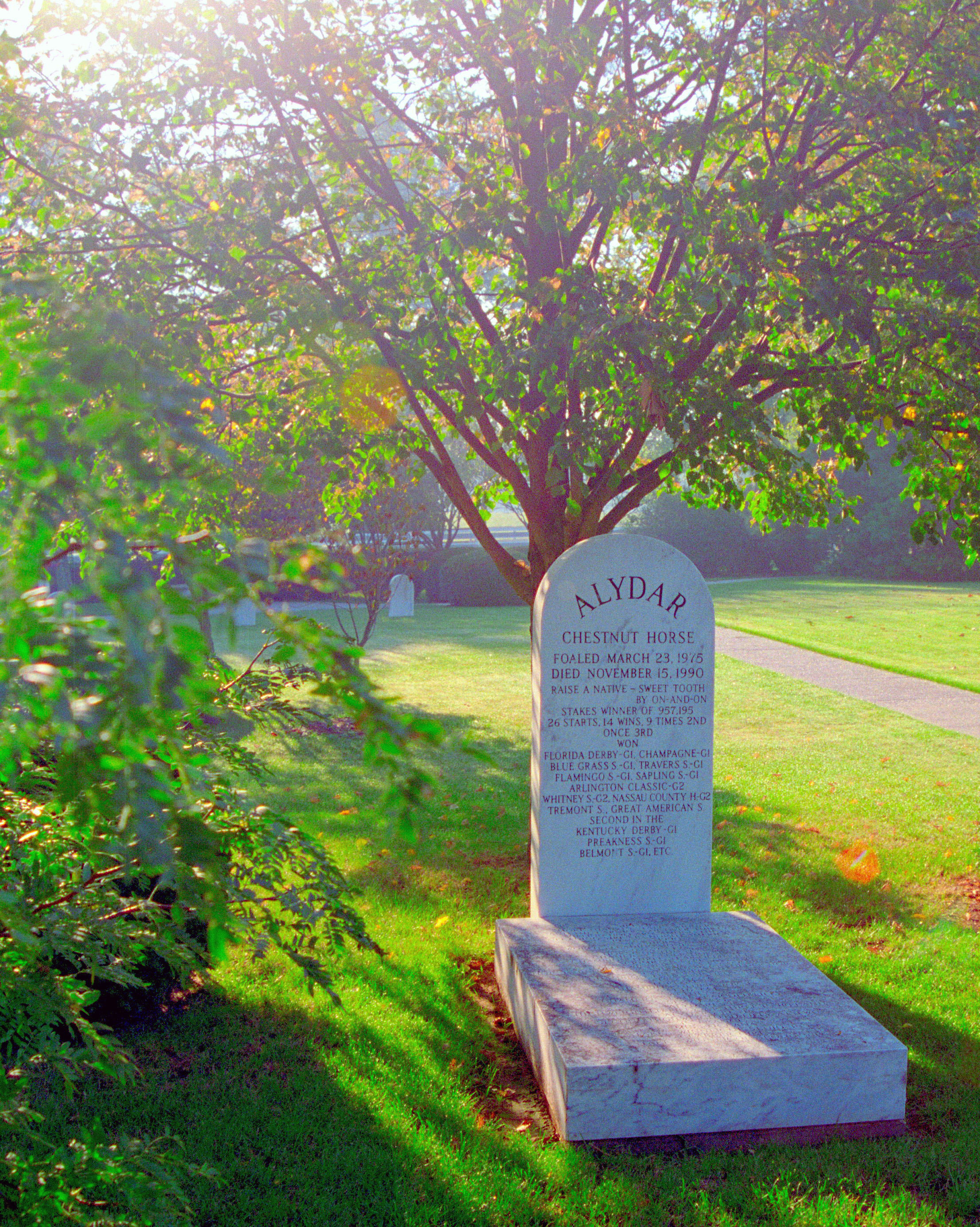
Alydar's grave at Calumet Farm.

On November 13, 1990, Alydar appeared to have shattered his right hind leg in his stall at Calumet Farm in Lexington, Kentucky. Emergency surgery was performed the next day in an attempt to repair the injury, but the leg broke again. On November 15, Alydar was euthanized. At the time the owner of Calumet Farm was in dire trouble financially, but suspicions of foul play by the management were not raised until federal prosecutors investigated in the late 1990s. John Thomas (J.T.) Lundy was indicted and convicted in 2000 on separate but related fraud charges—bribing a bank executive for favorable loans—and served nearly four years in prison. The farm's former attorney, Gary Matthews, was also convicted and received a 21-month prison sentence. The Texas Monthly described Alydar's death as "a sweeping saga of greed, fraud, and almost unimaginable cruelty that could have been lifted straight from a best-selling Dick Francis horse-racing novel." Alydar is buried at Calumet Farm.

In Houston federal court, MIT professor George Pratt testified that Alydar had to have been killed. He speculated that someone had tied the end of a rope around Alydar's leg and attached the other end of the rope to a truck that could easily have been driven into the stallion barn. The truck then took off, pulling Alydar's leg from underneath him until it snapped; he testified that the force involved was at least three times that which a horse was able to exert. About five days before Alydar's injury his original night watchman, Harold "Cowboy" Kipp, testified that he was at work on the farm when he was ordered to take Tuesday, November 13 off.

== Rivalry with Affirmed ==
Date	Track	Race	Distance	Alydar finish	Affirmed finish	Margin
6/15/1977	Belmont Park	Youthful Stakes	5 1/5 furlongs	5	1	5 lengths (to Alydar)
7/6/1977	Belmont Park	Great American Stakes	5 1/2	1	2	3 1/2
8/27/1977	Saratoga	Hopeful Stakes	6 1/2	2	1	1/2
9/10/1977	Belmont Park	Belmont Futurity	7	2	1	nose
10/15/1977	Belmont Park	Champagne Stakes	1 mile	1	2	1 1/4
10/29/1977	Laurel Park	Laurel Futurity	1 1/16 miles	2	1	neck
5/6/1978	Churchill Downs	Kentucky Derby	1 1/4	2	1	1 1/2
5/20/1978	Pimlico	Preakness Stakes	1 3/16	2	1	neck
6/10/1978	Belmont Park	Belmont Stakes	1 1/2	2	1	head
8/19/1978	Saratoga	Travers Stakes	1 1/4	1*	2*	1 3/4*

Final: Affirmed 7, Alydar 3

*In their final meeting, Affirmed drifted in, forcing Alydar to be taken up on the backstretch. While Affirmed finished ahead of Alydar, the stewards decided to disqualify Affirmed from first to second, giving Alydar the final win.

== Pedigree ==
Pedigree of Alydar
Sire Raise a Native	Native Dancer	Polynesian	Unbreakable
Sire Raise a Native	Native Dancer	Polynesian	Black Polly
Sire Raise a Native	Native Dancer	Geisha	Discovery
Sire Raise a Native	Native Dancer	Geisha	Miyako
Sire Raise a Native	Raise You	Case Ace	Teddy
Sire Raise a Native	Raise You	Case Ace	Sweetheart
Sire Raise a Native	Raise You	Lady Glory	American Flag
Sire Raise a Native	Raise You	Lady Glory	Beloved
Dam Sweet Tooth	On-and-On	Nasrullah	Nearco
Dam Sweet Tooth	On-and-On	Nasrullah	Mumtaz Begum
Dam Sweet Tooth	On-and-On	Two Lea	Bull Lea
Dam Sweet Tooth	On-and-On	Two Lea	Two Bob
Dam Sweet Tooth	Plum Cake	Ponder	Pensive
Dam Sweet Tooth	Plum Cake	Ponder	Miss Rushin
Dam Sweet Tooth	Plum Cake	Real Delight	Bull Lea
Dam Sweet Tooth	Plum Cake	Real Delight	Blue Delight (Family 9-c)

== See also ==
- List of racehorses
