= Affirmed =

American-bred Thoroughbred racehorse

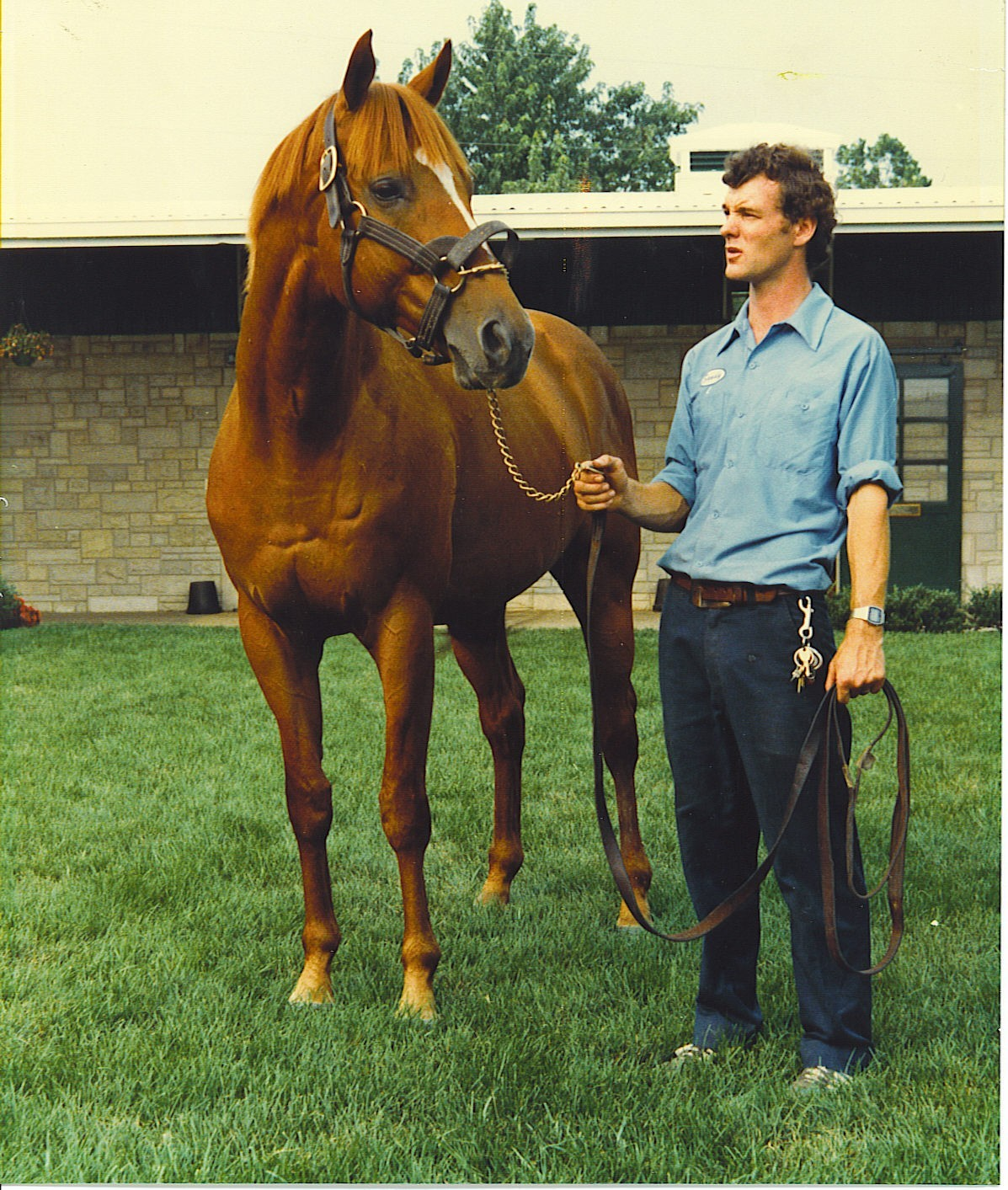
- Affirmed at Spendthrift Farm in 1981
- Sire: Exclusive Native
- Grandsire: Raise a Native
- Dam: Won't Tell You
- Damsire: Crafty Admiral
- Sex: Stallion
- Foaled: February 21, 1975; Marion County, Florida, U.S.
- Died: January 12, 2001 (aged 25) (Note: Officially, Affirmed was 26 years old at the time of his death as all Thoroughbreds foaled in the Northern Hemisphere are deemed to be born on January 1.)
- Country: United States
- Color: Chestnut
- Breeder: Harbor View Farm
- Owner: Harbor View Farm. Colors: Flamingo, white bars on black sleeves, black cap
- Trainer: Laz Barrera
- Record: 29: 22–5–1
- Earnings: $2,393,818

Major wins
- Youthful Stakes (1977); Hollywood Juvenile Championship (1977); Sanford Stakes (1977); Hopeful Stakes (1977); Futurity Stakes (1977); Laurel Futurity (1977); San Felipe Stakes (1978); Santa Anita Derby (1978); Hollywood Derby (1978); Jim Dandy Stakes (1978); Strub Stakes (1979); Santa Anita Handicap (1979); Californian Stakes (1979); Hollywood Gold Cup (1979); Woodward Stakes (1979); Jockey Club Gold Cup (1979) Triple Crown race wins: Kentucky Derby (1978); Preakness Stakes (1978); Belmont Stakes (1978)

Awards
- 11th U.S. Triple Crown Champion (1978); American Champion Two-Year-Old Colt (1977); American Champion Three-Year-Old Male Horse (1978); American Champion Older Male Horse (1979); American Horse of the Year (1978, 1979)

Honors
- United States Racing Hall of Fame (1980) #12 – Top 100 U.S. Racehorses of the 20th Century; Affirmed Handicap at Hollywood Park; Affirmed Stakes at Calder Race Course; Affirmed Street in Napa, California

Affirmed (February 21, 1975 – January 12, 2001) was a champion American Thoroughbred racehorse who is the eleventh winner of the American Triple Crown. Affirmed was well known for his famous rivalry with Alydar, whom he met ten times, including Alydar coming second in each of the three 1978 Triple Crown races. After Affirmed won the Triple Crown, there was a 37-year wait until American Pharoah swept the series in 2015.

Affirmed won fourteen Grade One stakes races over his career and was a champion each of the three years he raced. At age two in 1977, he was named the champion two-year-old after winning the Hollywood Juvenile Championship, Sanford, Hopeful, Belmont Futurity and Laurel Futurity. At age three, he was named "Horse of the Year" for winning the Triple Crown and other major stakes races such as the Santa Anita Derby, Hollywood Derby and Jim Dandy Stakes. He repeated as Horse of the Year at age four after winning the final seven races in his career, all but one of which was a Grade I stakes race. He was inducted into the Hall of Fame in 1980. On the Blood-Horse magazine list of the Top 100 U.S. Racehorses of the 20th Century, he was ranked twelfth.

== Background ==
Affirmed was a chestnut horse bred in Marion County, Florida by Louis Wolfson's Harbor View Farm. The derivation of the name "Affirmed" has been the subject of speculation, in part because the conviction of Wolfson, for securities law violations, had been affirmed on appeal in 1969, resulting in his imprisonment. Affirmed was sired by the Harbor View stallion Exclusive Native, a high-class racehorse and breeding stallion, whose other progeny included the Kentucky Derby-winning filly Genuine Risk.

== Racing record ==
=== 1977: two-year-old season ===
As a two-year-old, Affirmed won seven of his nine starts, with two placings, for earnings of $343,477 under regular rider Steve Cauthen, then a teenager. Notably, six of those starts were against his rival, Calumet Farm's Alydar, with Affirmed winning four and Alydar winning two.

Affirmed won his first start in a maiden special weight race at Belmont Park on May 24, 1977. He followed up with a win in the Youthful Stakes on June 15 where he defeated Alydar by eight lengths. On July 6 in the Great American Stakes, Alydar evened the score with a 3 1/2 length win after mounting a powerful stretch drive.

Affirmed was then shipped across country to Hollywood Park, where he won the Hollywood Juvenile Championship Stakes on July 23. He then shipped back to New York where he won the Sanford Stakes at Saratoga on August 17 by 2 1/2 lengths over the previously undefeated Tilt Up. In his next start on August 27 in the Hopeful Stakes, his main rival was Alydar, who was the even money favorite after winning four straight races. Affirmed stalked the early pace set by Tilt Up with Alydar in close contention. Around the far turn, Affirmed moved to the lead with Alydar closing ground on the outside. In mid-stretch, Alydar had closed to within a head but Affirmed pulled away in the final sixteenth of a mile to win by half a length. His time of 1:15 2/5 for 6 1/2 furlongs was a new stakes record.

The two horses again faced off in the Belmont Futurity on September 10, with Affirmed going off as the narrow favorite. After a good start, Affirmed settled into second place behind longshot Rough Sea, while Alydar overcame a bad start to move into third place down the backstretch. Rounding into the stretch, Affirmed moved to the lead. Alydar responded and the two horses dueled head-to-head for the final furlong. Alydar appeared to be in the lead for much of the stretch drive before Affirmed rallied in the final stride to win by a nose. "He never gave up", said Cauthen, "even when he was headed".

Alydar turned the tables in the Champagne Stakes on October 15, sweeping by Affirmed in the stretch to win by 1 1/4 lengths. The two faced off again in the Laurel Futurity on October 29, then one of the most prestigious races for two-year-olds in the country, with Affirmed winning by a neck. With his 4–2 margin in the series against Alydar, Affirmed was named the 1977 American Champion Two-Year-Old Colt.

=== 1978: three-year-old season ===
Affirmed started his three-year-old campaign on the West Coast with an allowance race win in March, followed by victories in the San Felipe Stakes, Santa Anita Derby and Hollywood Derby. Meanwhile, Alydar was preparing for the Kentucky Derby with wins in the Flamingo Stakes, Florida Derby and Blue Grass Stakes.

==== The Triple Crown ====
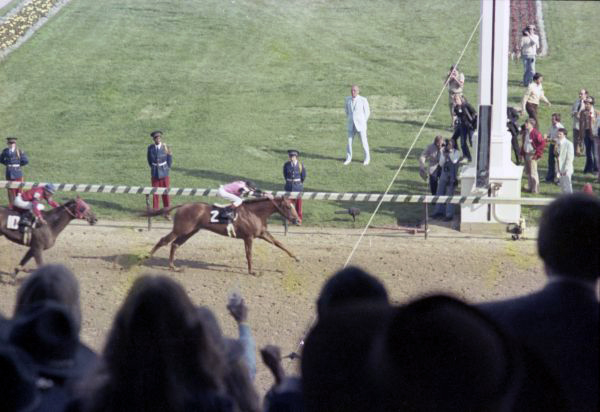
Affirmed crossing the finish line at Churchill Downs to win the 1978 Kentucky Derby

Alydar was made the 6–5 favorite for Kentucky Derby, with Affirmed the second choice at 9–5 and undefeated Sensitive Prince the third choice at 9–2. At the start of the Kentucky Derby, Sensitive Prince took the early lead as Affirmed ran in third through the early stages, while Alydar stayed far back. Affirmed made a strong move for the lead on the far turn, put away a challenge by Wood Memorial winner Believe It, and held off Alydar's fast-closing charge to win by 1 1/2 lengths. Affirmed now had a 5–2 edge in the series.

In the Preakness Stakes, Affirmed set the pace. Alydar made his big move on the far turn, at the same point in the race where Affirmed made his winning move in the Derby. Affirmed held a short lead entering the stretch and held it to defeat Alydar by a neck.

Alydar's partisans assumed that the 1 1/2 mile distance of the Belmont, two furlongs longer than the Derby and 5/16 of a mile longer than the Preakness Stakes, would favor Alydar with his finishing style and staying pedigree, and he would deny Affirmed the Triple Crown. Trainer Veitch removed Alydar's blinkers for the Belmont, saying that if Alydar got a better look at Affirmed, maybe he would get by him.

In the Belmont, Affirmed led and set a very slow pace, going the first quarter mile in 25 seconds and the half in 50 seconds. Alydar's jockey, Jorge Velásquez, put Alydar close to the pace, and moved alongside Affirmed with more than seven furlongs to go. For more than six furlongs (half the distance of the race), the colts raced neck and neck, pulling away from the rest of the field. Alydar got his nose in front at mid-stretch, but just as Affirmed appeared to tire, Cauthen went to a left-handed whip, something he had never done before in his eight rides on Affirmed. Affirmed won by a nose to become racing's 11th (and last winner for 37 years until American Pharoah won in 2015) Triple Crown winner. After the third slowest start in Belmont Stakes history, they raced the fastest last mile in Belmont Stakes history, 3/4 in 1:14, the mile in 1:37 2/5 and finished in 2:26 4/5. It was, at the time, the third fastest Belmont ever, behind Secretariat and Gallant Man.

His Triple Crown win set two records: the shortest and longest gaps between the previous and next Triple Crown winners. Affirmed's win in 1978 was the first time the Triple Crown had been won in consecutive years (Seattle Slew won in 1977). Affirmed's win also marked the start of the longest gap until the next Triple Crown winner, with American Pharoah's win on June 6, 2015, occurring 37 years later.

==== After the Triple Crown ====
Affirmed returned to racing in early August in the Jim Dandy Stakes at Saratoga. He nearly became an upset loser to the front-running Sensitive Prince but closed in the last 100 yards in a race that Laz Barrera considered one of Affirmed's finest efforts.

Alydar and Affirmed met once more, in the Travers Stakes at Saratoga. Affirmed, piloted by Hall of Fame jockey Laffit Pincay substituting for the injured Cauthen, cut off Alydar entering the far turn, causing his rival to hit the rail and almost go down, losing six lengths before recovering his stride. Affirmed finished first but was disqualified for interference, and placed second and Alydar was declared the winner. The horses never met again, and the final winning tally stood at Affirmed 7, Alydar 3.

Affirmed then prepared to meet another major rival: 1977 Triple Crown winner Seattle Slew. The 1978 Marlboro Cup Invitational Handicap marked the first time in racing history that two Triple Crown winners ever met in a race. Seattle Slew was a speed horse and got the first quarter mile in 24 seconds under jockey Angel Cordero, who never allowed Affirmed to get close. Seattle Slew won by three lengths in 1:45 4/5 for the one-turn mile and 1/8. The two horses met once more, in the Jockey Club Gold Cup. This time, Affirmed was to be aided by his stablemate Life's Hope, who was entered in the race to extend Seattle Slew in the early stages. However, Affirmed's saddle slipped during the race, leaving his jockey with almost no control. He tired to finish unplaced for the only time in his career as Exceller and jockey Willie Shoemaker defeated Seattle Slew by a nose.

As a three-year-old, Affirmed won 8 of 11 starts with 2 seconds and 1 unplaced run, for earnings of $901,541. He was named Horse of the Year despite the losses to Alydar, Seattle Slew, and Exceller, and was also named the American Champion Three-Year-Old Male Horse.

=== 1979: four-year-old season ===
As a four-year-old in 1979, Affirmed started the season with a third place in the Malibu Stakes and a second in the San Fernando Stakes. He had a five race losing sequence prior to starting in the Charles H. Strub Stakes at Santa Anita Park. Laz Barrera replaced Cauthen with Pincay and Affirmed didn't lose again and would dominate the handicaps the rest of the year.

Affirmed won the Strub Stakes, and then ran in the Santa Anita Handicap against Exceller, who had defeated Seattle Slew and Affirmed in 1978. Affirmed won easily, running the 1 1/4 miles in 1:58 3/5, under 128 pounds while setting a stakes record in California's most important stakes race that stood until 2014. Affirmed then went to Hollywood Park, where he won the Californian Stakes under 130 pounds giving runner-up Syncopate 16 pounds. Next, carrying top weight of 132 pounds, he won the Hollywood Gold Cup in a three horse finish, from Sirlad (120 pounds) and Text (119 pounds), setting an all time earnings record and running the 1 1/4 miles in a fast 1:58 2/5. Affirmed picked up the Woodward Stakes at Belmont Park, and then faced one more all-time great horse, three-year-old Spectacular Bid, in the Jockey Club Gold Cup, also at Belmont. Spectacular Bid, like Alydar, preferred to run off the pace, and once again, Affirmed was allowed to set a slow pace, going the first half mile in 49 seconds. Spectacular Bid issued challenges at Affirmed, but Affirmed won. Spectacular Bid was undefeated during the rest of his racing career.

Affirmed was named Horse of the Year and the American Champion Older Male Horse of 1979, having won 7 of 9 starts with 1 second and 1 third as a four-year-old and earning $1,148,800. In his career, Affirmed earned a then record $2,393,818 (the first Thoroughbred in North America to win over $2 million) with 22 wins, 5 seconds and 1 third from 29 starts.

His trainer, Laz Barrera, once said: "Affirmed is greater than Secretariat, or any Triple Crown winner, because only Affirmed had to face Alydar."

Affirmed's full race record is listed below:

Date	Racecourse	Distance	Race	Jockey	Weight	Odds	Field	Result	Time	Margin
24 May 77	Belmont Park	5 1/2 furlongs	Maiden Special	B Gonzalez	8-5	14/1	10	1st	1-06.0	4 1/2 lengths
15 Jun 77	Belmont Park	5 1/2 furlongs	Youthful Stakes	A Cordero	8-7	7/2	11	1st	1-05.0	Neck
06 Jul 77	Belmont Park	5 1/2 furlongs	Great American S.	A Cordero	8-10	9/2	7	2nd	1-03.6	3 1/2 lengths
23 Jul 77	Hollywood Park	6 furlongs	Hollywood Juvenile G2	L A Pincay	8-10	2/5f	8	1st	1-09.2	7 lengths
17 Aug 77	Saratoga	6 furlongs	Sanford Stakes G2	S Cauthen	8-12	5/4f	6	1st	1-09.6	2 3/4 lengths
27 Aug 77	Saratoga	6 1/2 furlongs	Hopeful Stakes G1	S Cauthen	8-10	9/4	5	1st	1–15.4	1/2 length
10 Sep 77	Belmont Park	7 furlongs	Futurity Stakes G1	S Cauthen	8-10	6/5f	5	1st	1-21.6	Nose
15 Oct 77	Belmont Park	1 mile	Champagne Stakes G1	S Cauthen	8-10	6/5f	6	2nd	1-36.6	1 1/4 lengths
29 Oct 77	Laurel Park	1 mile 1/2f	Laurel Futurity G1	S Cauthen	8-10	7/5	4	1st	1-44.2	Neck
08 Mar 78	Santa Anita	6 1/2 furlongs	Allowance	S Cauthen	8-12	1/5f	5	1st	1–15.6	5 lengths
18 Mar 78	Santa Anita	1 mile 1/2f	San Felipe H'cap G2	S Cauthen	9-0	3/10f	6	1st	1-42.6	2 lengths
02 Apr 78	Santa Anita	1 mile 1f	Santa Anita Derby G1	L A Pincay	8-8	3/10F	12	1st	1-48.0	8 lengths
16 Apr 78	Hollywood Park	1 mile 1f	Hollywood Derby G1	S Cauthen	8-10	3/10f	9	1st	1-48.2	2 lengths
6 May 78	Churchill Downs	1 1/4 miles	Kentucky Derby G1	S Cauthen	9-0	9/5	11	1st	2-01.2	1 1/2 lengths
20 May 78	Pimlico	1 mile 1 1/2f	Preakness Stakes G1	S Cauthen	9-0	1/2f	7	1st	1-54.4	Neck
10 Jun 78	Belmont Park	1 1/2 miles	Belmont Stakes G1	S Cauthen	9-0	3/5f	5	1st	2-26.8	Head
08 Aug 78	Saratoga	1 mile 1f	Jim Dandy Stakes G3	S Cauthen	9-2	1/20f	5	1st	1-47.8	1/2 length
19 Aug 78	Saratoga	1 1/4 miles	Travers Stakes G1	L A Pincay	9-0	7/10f	4	1st (D)	2-02.0	1 3/4 lengths
16 Sep 78	Belmont Park	1 mile 1f	Marlboro Cup (H'cap) G1	S Cauthen	8-12	1/2f	6	2nd	1-45.8	3 lengths
14 Oct 78	Belmont Park	1 1/2 miles	Jockey Club Gold Cup G1	S Cauthen	8-9	11/5	6	5th	2-27.2	19 lengths
07 Jan 79	Santa Anita	7 furlongs	Malibu Stakes G2	S Cauthen	9-0	3/10f	5	3rd	1-21.0	2 1/2 lengths
20 Jan 79	Santa Anita	1 mile 1f	San Fernando Stakes G2	S Cauthen	9-0	1/2f	8	2nd	1-48.0	2 3/4 lengths
04 Feb 79	Santa Anita	1 1/4 miles	Charles H Strub S. G1	L A Pincay	9-0	9/10f	9	1st	2-01.0	10 lengths
04 Mar 79	Santa Anita	1 1/4 miles	Santa Anita Handicap G1	L A Pincay	9-2	5/4f	8	1st	1-58.6	4 1/2 lengths
20 May 79	Hollywood Park	1 mile 1/2f	Californian Stakes G1	L A Pincay	9-4	3/10f	8	1st	1-41.2	5 lengths
24 Jun 79	Hollywood Park	1 1/4 miles	Hollywood Gold Cup G1	L A Pincay	9-6	3/10f	10	1st	1-58.4	3/4 length
29 Aug 79	Belmont Park	1 mile	Allowance	L A Pincay	8-10	No SP	3	1st	1-34.0	6 lengths
22 Sep 79	Belmont Park	1 1/4 miles	Woodward Stakes G1	L A Pincay	9-0	2/5f	5	1st	2-01.6	2 1/2 lengths
06 Oct 79	Belmont Park	1 1/2 miles	Jockey Club Gold Cup G1	L A Pincay	9-0	3/5f	4	1st	2-27.4	3/4 length

== Stud record ==
Affirmed was syndicated at a then-record $14.4 million. At stud, Affirmed sired over 80 stakes winners, 9 champions with earnings in excess of $44,000,000 (through 2004) including:

- Charlie Barley, stakes winner in US, winner of Canadian Champion Male Turf Horse in 1989
- Flawlessly, North America's grass course champion in 1992 and 1993
- Peteski (CAN), won USA Molson Export Million Stakes and Canadian Triple Crown.
- The Tin Man, won multiple Grade I races, including the Arlington Million
- Trusted Partner (USA), won G1 IRE One Thousand Guineas

Though Affirmed never raced on the turf (grass) he was a noted sire of turf runners, most notably multiple Grade I winners Flawlessly and The Tin Man. As a broodmare sire, his daughters have notably produced Honey Ryder (G1W on turf), Meisho Doto (G1 winner of the Takarazuka Kinen), Narita Top Road (G1 winner on Turf in Japan most notable win was the Kikuka Sho), and Pleasantly Perfect (G1W on dirt & synthetic, notable wins include Breeders Cup Classic and the Dubai World Cup).

In 2001, Affirmed was euthanized after falling seriously ill with laminitis, a circulatory hoof disease. The same disease has also led to the death of fellow Triple Crown winner Secretariat and Kentucky Derby winner Barbaro. He was buried whole—the ultimate honor for a race horse—at Jonabell Farm, wearing the flamingo pink colors of his original owners, Harbor View Farm.

== Rivalry with Alydar ==
Date	Track	Race	Distance	Affirmed finish	Alydar finish	Margin
6/15/1977	Belmont Park	Youthful Stakes	5 1/5 furlongs	1	5	5 lengths (to Alydar)
7/6/1977	Belmont Park	Great American Stakes	5 1/2	2	1	3 1/2
8/27/1977	Saratoga	Hopeful Stakes	6 1/2	1	2	1/2
9/10/1977	Belmont Park	Belmont Futurity	7	1	2	nose
10/15/1977	Belmont Park	Champagne Stakes	1 mile	2	1	1 1/4
10/29/1977	Laurel Park	Laurel Futurity	1 1/16 miles	1	2	neck
5/6/1978	Churchill Downs	Kentucky Derby	1 1/4	1	2	1 1/2
5/20/1978	Pimlico	Preakness Stakes	1 3/16	1	2	neck
6/10/1978	Belmont Park	Belmont Stakes	1 1/2	1	2	head
8/19/1978	Saratoga	Travers Stakes	1 1/4	2*	1*	1 3/4*

Final: Affirmed 7, Alydar 3

*In their final meeting, Affirmed drifted in, forcing Alydar to be taken up on the backstretch. While Affirmed finished ahead of Alydar, the stewards decided to disqualify Affirmed from first to second, giving Alydar the final win.

== Honors ==
In the Blood-Horse magazine ranking of the top 100 U.S. thoroughbred champions of the 20th Century, Affirmed was ranked #12.

His career has been honored with his election to the National Museum of Racing and Hall of Fame in 1980.

== Pedigree ==
Pedigree of Affirmed, chestnut stallion, 1975
Sire Exclusive Native 1965	Raise a Native; 1961	Native Dancer	Polynesian
Sire Exclusive Native 1965	Raise a Native; 1961	Native Dancer	Geisha
Sire Exclusive Native 1965	Raise a Native; 1961	Raise You	Case Ace
Sire Exclusive Native 1965	Raise a Native; 1961	Raise You	Lady Glory
Sire Exclusive Native 1965	Exclusive; 1953	Shut Out	Equipoise
Sire Exclusive Native 1965	Exclusive; 1953	Shut Out	Goose Egg
Sire Exclusive Native 1965	Exclusive; 1953	Good Example	Pilate
Sire Exclusive Native 1965	Exclusive; 1953	Good Example	Parade Girl
Dam Won't Tell You 1962	Crafty Admiral; 1948	Fighting Fox	Sir Gallahad (FR)
Dam Won't Tell You 1962	Crafty Admiral; 1948	Fighting Fox	Marguerite
Dam Won't Tell You 1962	Crafty Admiral; 1948	Admiral's Lady	War Admiral
Dam Won't Tell You 1962	Crafty Admiral; 1948	Admiral's Lady	Boola Brook
Dam Won't Tell You 1962	Scarlet Ribbon; 1957	Volcanic	Ambrose Light (FR)
Dam Won't Tell You 1962	Scarlet Ribbon; 1957	Volcanic	Hot Supper
Dam Won't Tell You 1962	Scarlet Ribbon; 1957	Native Valor	Mahmoud (FR)
Dam Won't Tell You 1962	Scarlet Ribbon; 1957	Native Valor	Native Gal (family: 23-b)

== See also ==
- List of leading Thoroughbred racehorses
- List of racehorses
