= Calumet Farm =

Thoroughbred racing and breeding operation

Coordinates: 38°02′52.3″N 84°34′37.5″W

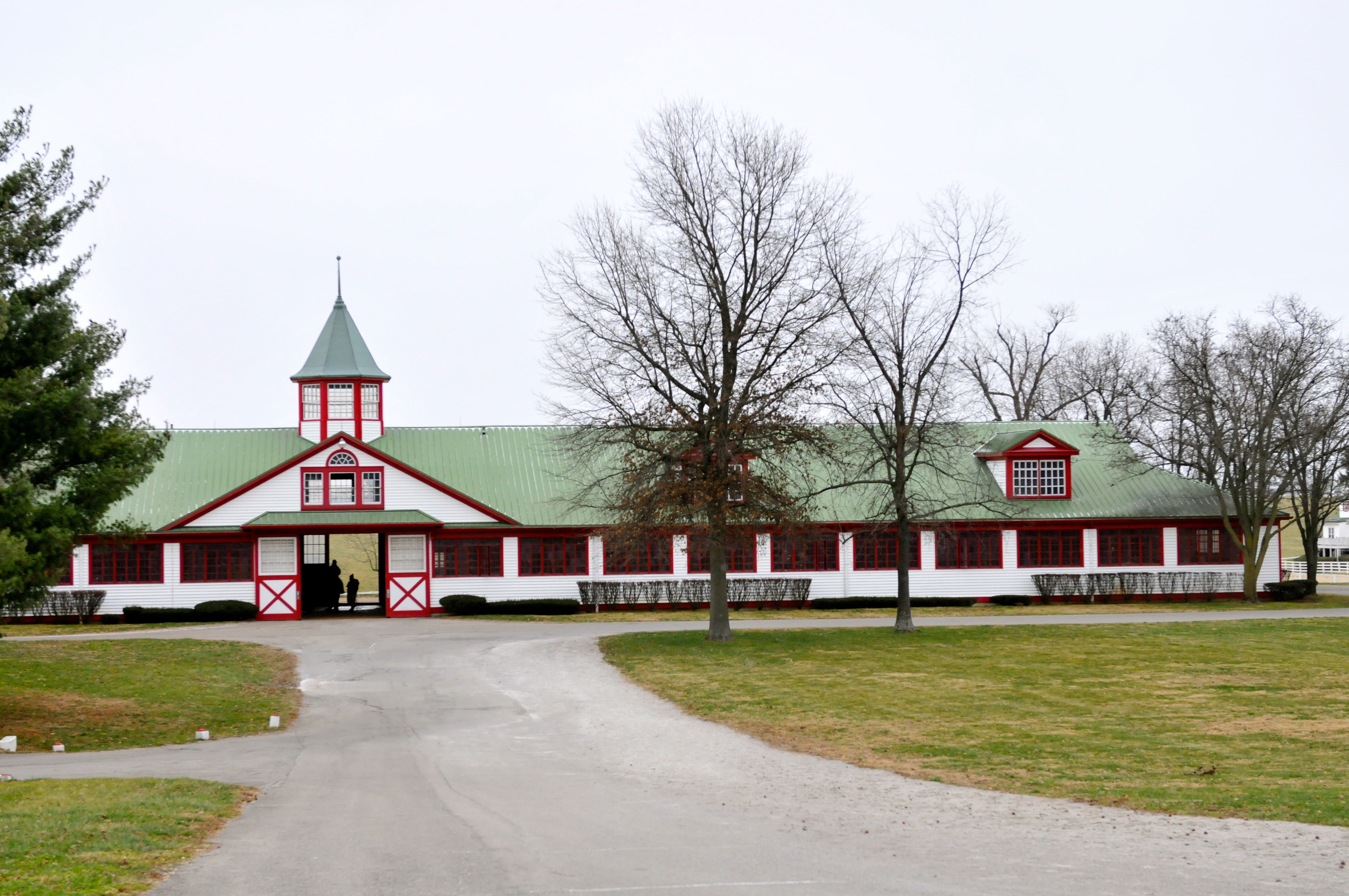
- Stables at Calumet Farm, January 2012
- Type: Horse breeding farm and Thoroughbred racing stable
- Industry: Thoroughbred horse racing
- Headquarters: Lexington, Kentucky
- Key people: William Monroe Wright founding owner (1924–1932); Warren Wright, Sr. (owner 1932–1950); Lucille Parker Wright Markey (owner 1950–1982); Bertha Wright, Lucille Wright Lundy, Courtenay Wright Lancaster, Warren Wright III, and Thomas C. Wright (owners 1982–1992) J. T. Lundy, president (1982–1992); Henryk de Kwiatkowski owner (1992–2003); de Kwiatkowski Trust (owner 2003–2012); Calumet Investment Group owner 2012–present; Brad M. Kelley, lessee

Calumet Farm is a 762-acre (3.08 km^{2}) Thoroughbred breeding and training farm established in 1924 in Lexington, Kentucky, United States by William Monroe Wright, founding owner of the Calumet Baking Powder Company. Calumet is located in the heart of the Bluegrass, a well-known horse breeding region. Calumet Farm has a record history of Kentucky Derby and Triple Crown winners and 11 horses in the National Museum of Racing and Hall of Fame.

== Horses ==
Calumet Farm has produced ten Kentucky Derby winners, more than any other operation. The farm is also the leading breeder and owner of Preakness Stakes winners, with seven each. Two of the farm's colts have won the U.S. Triple Crown and three females the Triple Crown for fillies.

Calumet Farm's winners of the Kentucky Derby are: Whirlaway (1941), Pensive (1944), Citation (1948), Ponder (sired by Pensive - 1949), Hill Gail (1952), Iron Liege (1957), Tim Tam (1958), Forward Pass (1968 by DQ), Strike the Gold (1991) and Rich Strike (2022). Two of these greats, Whirlaway and Citation, are United States Triple Crown of Thoroughbred Racing champions.

Eleven of the farm's horses have been inducted into the National Museum of Racing and Hall of Fame.

Other well-known horses include Nellie Flag, Armed, Two Lea, Mar-Kell, A Gleam, Twilight Tear, Mark-Ye-Well, A Glitter, Bewitch, Coaltown, Real Delight, Bardstown, Our Mims, Davona Dale, Alydar, and Before Dawn.

== History ==
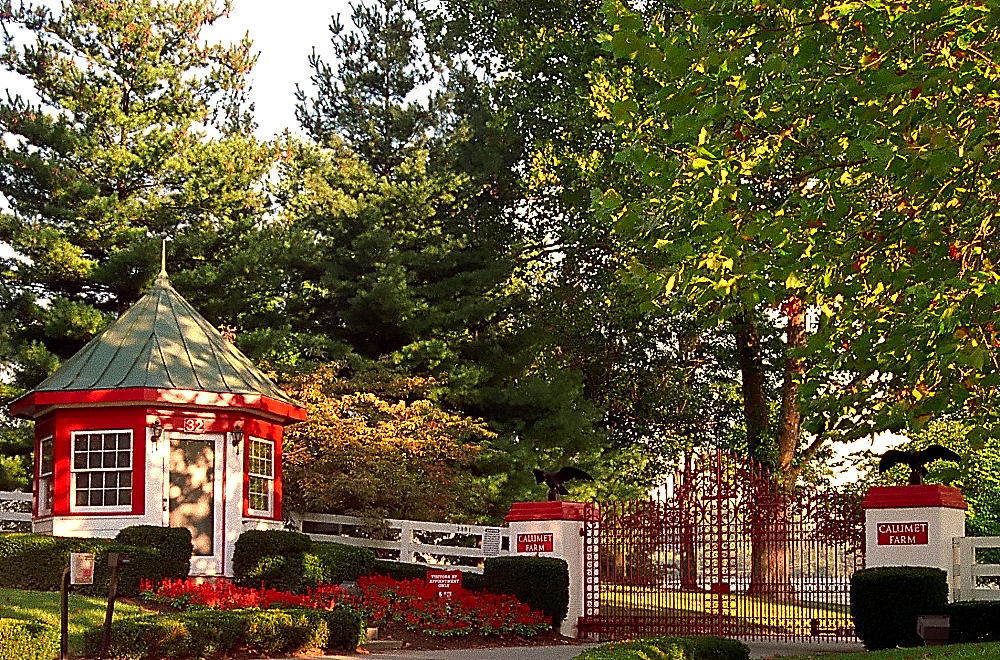
Gate at Calumet Farm

Calumet's racing silks

Historic "Devil's Red and Blue" silks of Calumet farm, sold to a Brazilian investment group in 1992

Brad Kelley's Bluegrass Hill silks are now used by Calumet race horses

Founded in Libertyville, Illinois, the Standardbred breeding operation was moved to the more favorable climate of Kentucky by W. M. Wright. At a time when harness racing was the most popular type of horse racing, in 1931 the farm's trotter "Calumet Butler" won the most prestigious event of the day, the Hambletonian.

After Wright died in 1932, his son Warren Wright, Sr. took over the business and began converting it to Thoroughbred breeding and training. His acquisition of quality breeding stock saw Calumet Farm develop into one of North America's most successful stables in Thoroughbred racing history. Calumet Farm was added to the National Register of Historic Places in 1991. The Pennsylvania Railroad named its baggage car #5868 the "Calumet Farm".

A key move was acquiring part ownership in Blenheim, a stallion imported from England, and its foundation sire, Bull Lea.

Under Warren Wright, Sr. and his wife Lucille Parker Wright, who inherited the property on his death in 1950, Calumet was the top money-earning farm in racing for 12 years.

In 1969, the Keeneland Association honored Calumet Farm with its Keeneland Mark of Distinction for their contribution to Keeneland and the Thoroughbred industry.

Lucille Wright died in 1982 and according to the terms of her first husband's will, the farm went to the heirs of their only child, Warren Wright, Jr. (1920–1978). John Thomas "J.T." Lundy, who married Lucille "Cindy" Wright, took over as head of operations and president.

Calumet Farm won the 1990 Eclipse Award for Outstanding Breeder. In November of that year, details surrounding the death of 15-year-old Alydar—America's leading sire of the time—and the collection of a $36 million insurance policy brought a cloud of suspicion over the business. Under Lundy, mismanagement and fraud had left the farm with significant debt that led Calumet Farm to file for bankruptcy protection in 1991 as they were losing $1 million a month. After years of legal proceedings, in 2000, Lundy along with Gary Matthews, the farm's former attorney and chief financial officer, was convicted of fraud and bribery and sent to prison.

In 1992, a trust established by Henryk de Kwiatkowski, a Polish-born Canadian, purchased Calumet Farm, saving it from possible liquidation. Since 1992, the farm has been fully restored to its former beauty.

In 2012, the Calumet Investment Group bought Calumet Farm from the de Kwiatkowski Trust for more than $36 million. Calumet Investment Group in turn leased it to Brad M. Kelley, believed to be a member of the investment group. Kelley's horses race under the name of Calumet Farm, but they carry Kelley's black and gold racing colors, as the original "Devil's Red and Blue" silks of Calumet had been sold to a Brazilian investment group. The win of Oxbow in the 2013 Preakness Stakes marked the return of Calumet to the winner's circle of a Triple Crown race for the first time since 1968.
