= Humana Distaff Handicap finishers and starters =

This is a listing of the horses that finished in either first, second, or third place and the number of starters in the Humana Distaff Handicap, an American Grade 1 race for fillies and mares age four and up at seven furlongs on the dirt held at Churchill Downs in Louisville, Kentucky.

Year	Winner	Second	Third	Starters
2017	Paulassilverlining	Finest City	Carina Mia	7
2016	Taris	Stonetastic	Enchanting Lady	9
2015	Dame Dorothy	Judy the Beauty	Moonlit Stroll	7
2014	Midnight Lucky	Street Girl	Scherzinger	6
2013	Aubby K	Burban	Holiday Soiree	9
2012	Groupie Doll	Musical Romance	Magical Feeling	9
2011	Sassy Image	Hilda's Passion	Amen Hallelujah	7
2010	Mona de Momma	Pretty Prolific	Informed Decision	9
2009	Informed Decision	Temple Street	Dubai Majesty	9
2008	Intagaroo	Baroness Thatcher	Hystericalady	8
2007	Hystericalady	Pussycat Doll	Carriage Trail	10
2006	Pussycat Doll	Behaving Badly	Bending Strings	8
2005	My Trusty Cat	Molta Vita	Puxa Saco	9
2004	Mayo on the Side	Azeri	Randaroo	4
2003	Sightseek	Gold Mover	Miss Lodi	8
2002	Celtic Melody	Gold Mover	Hattiesburg	9
2001	Dream Supreme	La Feminn	Nany's Sweep	5
2000	Ruby Surprise	Honest Lady	Cassidy	7
1999	Zuppardo Ardo	French Braids	Prospector's Song	9
1998	Colonial Minstrel	Stop Traffic	Meter Maid	11
1997	Capote Belle	Hidden Lake	J J's Dream	8
1996	In Conference	Supah Jess	Morris Code	8
1995	Laura's Pistolette	Morning Meadow	Traverse City	10
1994	Roamin Rachel	Arches of Gold	Glory's Ghost	7
1993	Court Hostess	Santa Catalina	Ifyoucouldseemenow	12
1992	Ifyoucouldseemenow	Madam Bear	Magal	10
1991	Illeria	Nurse Dopey	Tipsy Girl	10
1990	Medicine Woman	Lost Lode	Gallant Ryder	9
1989	Sunshine Always	Littlebitapleasure	Lt. Lao	5
1988	Le l'Argent	Lady Gretchan	Intently	7
1987	Lazer Show	Weekend Delight	Ten Thousand Stars	7

== See also ==
- List of graded stakes at Churchill Downs
