= Groupie Doll Stakes top three finishers =

This is a listing of the horses that finished in either first, second, or third place and the number of starters in the Groupie Doll Stakes, an American Listed race for three-year-olds and up fillies and mares. It has been run at 1 mile beginning in 2005 on synthetic surface held at Ellis Park in Henderson, Kentucky. (List 1982–present)

Year	Winner	Second	Third	Starters
2023				
2022	Li'l Tootsie	Jilted Bride	Recoded	10
2021	Matera	Lady Kate	High Regard	12
2020	Lady Kate	New Roo	Istan Council	11
2019	Go Google Yourself	Divine Queen	Moonlit Garden	6
2018	Champagne Problems	Sense of Bravery	Pinch Hit	10
2017	Tiger Moth	Walkabout	Danzatrice	11
2016	Innovative Idea	Emmajestic	Ahh Chocolate	11
2015	Call Pat	Fioretti	Pistolpackinpenny	12
2014	Molly Morgan	Tapit's World	Livi MaKenzie	8
2013	Devious Intent	Magic Hour	Groupie Doll	9
2012	Salty Strike	Joyful Victory	Ridgester	9
2011	Groupie Doll	Secret File	Stage Magic	12
2010	Direct Line	West Hope	Choragus	11
2009	Whirlie Bertie	Abby's Angel	Lady's Laughter	9
2008	Swift Temper	Marquee Delivery	Miss Atlantic	6
2007	Pleasant Hills	High Heels	Brownie Points	11
2006	Prospective Saint	Maggie Slew	Plaid	10
2005	Dream of Summer	Halory Leigh	Tempus Fugit	8
2004	Angela's Love	Miss Fortunate	Bare Necessities	6
2003	Bare Necessities	Desert Gold	So Much More	9
2002	Minister's Baby	Lakenheath	Softly	8
2001	Asher	Zenith	Royal Fair	8
2000	Silent Eskimo	Roza Robata	Tap to Music	7
1999	Lines of Beauty	Roza Robata	Castle Blaze	10
1998	Meter Maid	Proper Banner	Three Fanfares	7
1997	Three Fanfares	Gold n Delicious	Birr	7
1996	Country Cat	Bedroom Blues	Alcovy	7
1995	Laura's Pistolette	Sadie's Dream	Cat Appeal	9
1994	Alphabulous	Added Asset	Hey Hazel	10
1993	Erica's Dream	Fappies Cosy Miss	Hitch	8
1992	Bungalow	Forever Fond	Fappies Cosy Miss	11
1991	Summer Matinee	Blissful Union	Beth Believes	11
1990	Evangelical	Degenerate Gal	Anitas Surprise	10
1989	Lawyer Talk	Gallant Ryder	Miss Barbour	10
1988	Lt. Lao	Sausy Deb	Silk's Lady	12
1987	No Choice	Layovernite	Firgie's Jule	11
1986	Queen Alexandra	Fleet Secretariat	Sherizar	7
1985	Crimson Orchid	Electric Fanny	Dusty Gloves	14
1984	Rambling Rhythm	Run Tulle Run	Queen of Song	8
1983	Migola	Kitchen	Run Tulle Run	14
1982	Sweetest Chant	Muriesk	Run Tulle Run	8
