= Madison Stakes =

- Class: Grade I
- Location: Keeneland Race Course; Lexington, Kentucky, United States
- Inaugurated: 2002
- Race type: Thoroughbred – Flat racing
- Sponsor: Resolute Racing (2024)
- Website: www.keeneland.com

Race information
- Distance: 7 furlongs
- Surface: Dirt
- Track: Left-handed
- Qualification: Fillies and mares, four-years-old & up
- Weight: 123 lbs with allowances
- Purse: $650,000 (2025)

The Madison Stakes is a Grade I American Thoroughbred horse race for fillies and mares that are four years old or older, over a distance of seven furlongs on the dirt held annually in early April at Keeneland Race Course, Lexington, Kentucky during the spring meeting. The event currently carries a purse of $650,000.

== History ==
The race is named for Madison County, the largest county in the Bluegrass region of Kentucky.

The event was inaugurated on 10 April 2002 and was won by the favorite Victory Ride by one length in a time of 1:23 7/10.

In 2005 the event was upgraded from a Listed race to Grade III status, then in 2006 to Grade II. In 2009 it became a Grade I event.

From 2006 to 2014, it was contested on a Polytrack artificial dirt surface. After the spring meet of 2014, the Polytrack was replaced by a new dirt surface.

Between 2004 and 2012 the name of the event carried its sponsor, Vinery, a local Thoroughbred breeding operation near the Lexington area.

== Records ==
Speed record

- 1.21:32 – Dr. Zic (2010)

Margins

- 4 3/4 lengths – Dubai Escapade (2006)

Most wins by a jockey

- 3 – Edgar Prado (2002, 2006, 2007)

Most wins by an owner

- 2 – Juddmonte Farms (2008, 2017)

Most wins by a trainer

- 3 – Chad C. Brown (2017, 2020, 2023)

== Winners ==
Year	Winner	Age	Jockey	Trainer	Owner	Distance	Time	Purse	Grade	Ref
2026	Eclatanat	4	Irad Ortiz Jr.	Brad H. Cox	Stonestreet Stables	7 furlongs	1:21.84	$629,357	I	
2025	Positano Sunset	5	Julien Leparoux	Ian R. Wilkes	Six Column Stables, Randall L. Bloch, John Seiler & David Hall	7 furlongs	1:23.39	$623,338	I	
2024	Alva Starr	4	Tyler Gaffalione	Brett A. Brinkman	P. Dale Ladner	7 furlongs	1:23.36	$591,050	I	
2023	Goodnight Olive	5	Irad Ortiz Jr.	Chad C. Brown	First Row Partners & Team Hanley	7 furlongs	1:23.12	$580,000	I	
2022	Just One Time	4	Flavien Prat	Brad H. Cox	Warrior's Reward & Commonwealth New Era Racing	7 furlongs	1:22.79	$439,850	I	
2021	Kimari	4	Joel Rosario	Wesley A. Ward	Ten Broeck Farm	7 furlongs	1:21.53	$300,000	I	
2020	Guarana	4	José L. Ortiz	Chad C. Brown	Three Chimneys Farm & Hill 'n' Dale Equine Holdings Inc	7 furlongs	1:21.70	$250,000	I	
2019	Spiced Perfection	5	Javier Castellano	Peter L. Miller	Carl Pantofel Stable, Wachtel Stable & Peter Deutsch	7 furlongs	1:23.49	$300,000	I	
2018	Finley'sluckycharm	5	Brian Hernandez Jr.	W. Bret Calhoun	Carl R. Moore Management	7 furlongs	1:22.82	$300,000	I	
2017	Paulassilverlining	5	José L. Ortiz	Chad C. Brown	Juddmonte Farms	7 furlongs	1:23.68	$300,000	I	
2016	Sheer Drama	6	Joe Bravo	David Fawkes	Harold L. Queen	7 furlongs	1:22.07	$300,000	I	
2015	Princess Violet	4	Junior Alvarado	Linda L. Rice	Barry K. Schwartz	7 furlongs	1:22.73	$350,000	I	
2014	Judy the Beauty	5	John R. Velazquez	Wesley A. Ward	Wesley A. Ward	7 furlongs	1:22.86	$300,000	I	
2013	Last Full Measure	5	Corey Nakatani	Philip J. Oliver	St. George Farm Racing	7 furlongs	1:23.32	$300,000	I	
2012	Groupie Doll	4	Rajiv Maragh	William B. Bradley	Fred & William Bradley, Carl Hurst & Brent Burns	7 furlongs	1:23.76	$300,000	I	
2011	Shotgun Gulch	4	Garrett K. Gomez	C. R. Trout	C. R. Trout	7 furlongs	1:24.14	$300,000	I	
2010	Dr. Zic	4	Kent J. Desormeaux	Joan Scott	Derby Lane Farm, Tom, Jim, Farrell, Marette & Joan Scott	7 furlongs	1:21.32	$300,000	I	
2009	Informed Decision	4	John R. Velazquez	Jonathan E. Sheppard	Augustin Stable	7 furlongs	1:21.64	$300,000	I	
2008	Ventura	4	Garrett K. Gomez	Robert J. Frankel	Juddmonte Farms	7 furlongs	1:22.06	$200,000	II	
2007	Mary Delaney	4	Edgar S. Prado	Eddie Kenneally	Fergus Galvin	7 furlongs	1:22.24	$200,000	II	
2006	Dubai Escapade	4	Edgar S. Prado	Eoin G. Harty	Darley Racing	7 furlongs	1:22.34	$200,000	II	
2005	Madcap Escapade	4	Jerry D. Bailey	Frank L. Brothers	W. Bruce Lunsford	7 furlongs	1:23.33	$200,000	III	
2004	Ema Bovary (CHI)	5	Roberto M. Gonzalez	Larry D. Ross	Richard T. Beal Jr. & Lana Ramsey-Brog	7 furlongs	1:23.41	$175,000	Listed	
2003	A New Twist	4	Pat Day	John C. Kimmel	Lucille Conover & George Bolton	7 furlongs	1:24.32	$132,769	Listed	
2002	Victory Ride	4	Edgar S. Prado	George R. Arnold II	G. Watts & Louise Ireland Humphrey	7 furlongs	1:23.70	$111,300	Listed	

Legend:
All Weather Track Dirt

== See also ==
- List of American and Canadian Graded races
