= Presque Isle Downs Masters Stakes =

- Class: Grade II
- Location: Presque Isle Downs & Casino; Summit Township, Pennsylvania, U.S.
- Inaugurated: 2007
- Race type: Thoroughbred - Flat racing
- Website: presqueisledowns.com

Race information
- Distance: 6 1/2 furlongs
- Surface: All Weather Track
- Track: left-handed
- Qualification: fillies and mares, three years old and older
- Weight: Base weights with allowances: 4-year-olds and up: 124 lbs. 3-year-olds: 120 lbs. Graded stakes race winners 1 lbs. added
- Purse: $300,000 (2023)

The Presque Isle Downs Masters Stakes is a Grade II American Thoroughbred horse race for fillies and mares that are three years old or older, over a distance of 6 1/2 furlongs on the all weather track held annually in September at Presque Isle Downs & Casino racetrack in Summit Township, Pennsylvania. The event currently carries a purse of $300,000.

== History ==
The race was inaugurated in 2007 with an attractive purse offered of $400,000 over the distance of six furlongs. The distance of the event was increased to 6 1/2 furlongs in 2009. That same year, 2009, the event was upgraded to a Grade III and two years later in 2011 to a Grade II.

The event has become the highlight of the meet and attracts fine fillies and mares from Canada and USA including dual winner of the event Informed Decision who later won the 2009 Breeders' Cup Filly & Mare Sprint, and Groupie Doll won the Breeders' Cup Filly & Mare Sprint in 2012 and 2013.

The event was not held in 2020 and 2021 due to the COVID-19 pandemic in the United States.

== Records ==
Speed record:

- 6 1/2 furlongs: 1:13.92 - Roses For Debra (2024) (new track record)
- 6 furlongs: 1:07:95 - Wild Gams (2008)

Margins:

- 4 1/4 lengths – Hotshot Anna (2018)

Most wins by a jockey

- 2 – Julien R. Leparoux (2009, 2010)
- 2 – Rajiv Maragh (2012, 2013)
- 2 – Antonio A. Gallardo (2018, 2019)
- 2 – Edgard J. Zayas (2023, 2026)

Most wins by a trainer

- 3 – Saffie Joseph Jr. (2022, 2023, 2026)

Most wins by an owner

- 2 – Augustin Stable (2009, 2010)
- 2 – Fred Bradley, William Bradley, Carl Hurst & Brent Burns (2012, 2013)
- 2 – HnR Nothhaft Horse Racing (2014, 2015)
- 2 – Hugh H. Robertson (2018, 2019)

== Winners ==
Year	Winner	Age	Jockey	Trainer	Owner	Distance	Time	Purse	Grade	Ref
Presque Isle Downs Masters Stakes
2026	Reagan's Flame	5	Edgard J. Zayas	Saffie A. Joseph Jr.	St. Elias Stable, BAG Racing Stables, Turf Express Racing and Watkins Diamond Stables	6 1/2 furlongs	1:14.62	$300,000	II	
2025	Gal in a Rush	6	Joel Rosario	Miguel Clement	West Point Thoroughbreds, Chris Larsen & Titletown Racing Stables	6 1/2 furlongs	1:14.45	$301,000	II	
2024	Roses for Debra	5	Irad Ortiz Jr.	Christophe Clement	Cheyenne Stable & John O'Meara	6 1/2 furlongs	1:13.92	$300,250	II	
2023	Accomplished Girl	3	Edgard Zayas	Saffie Joseph Jr.	Gentry Farms	6 1/2 furlongs	1:15.29	$298,500	II	
2022	Artie's Princess*	5	Jose L. Ortiz	Saffie Joseph Jr.	Kenneth Ramsey & Estate of Sarah Ramsey	6 1/2 furlongs	1:14.57	$400,600	II	
2021	Race not held									
2020	Race not held									
2019	Hotshot Anna	5	Antonio A. Gallardo	Hugh H. Robertson	Hugh H. Robertson	6 1/2 furlongs	1:15.32	$400,000	II	
2018	Hotshot Anna	4	Antonio A. Gallardo	Hugh H. Robertson	Hugh H. Robertson	6 1/2 furlongs	1:14.73	$400,600	II	
2017	Ami's Mesa	4	Luis Contreras	Josie Carroll	Ivan Dalos	6 1/2 furlongs	1:14.68	$400,800	II	
2016	Sarah Sis	4	Florent Geroux	Ingrid Mason	Joe Ragsdale	6 1/2 furlongs	1:16.42	$400,200	II	
2015	Living The Life (IRE)	5	Joe Bravo	Gary Mandella	HnR Nothhaft Horse Racing	6 1/2 furlongs	1:15.17	$400,000	II	
2014	Living The Life (IRE)	4	Mike E. Smith	Gary Mandella	HnR Nothhaft Horse Racing	6 1/2 furlongs	1:15.26	$400,400	II	
2013	Groupie Doll	5	Rajiv Maragh	William B. Bradley	Fred Bradley, William Bradley, Carl Hurst & Brent Burns	6 1/2 furlongs	1:14.88	$400,200	II	
2012	Groupie Doll	4	Rajiv Maragh	William B. Bradley	Fred Bradley, William Bradley, Carl Hurst & Brent Burns	6 1/2 furlongs	1:16.32	$400,600	II	
2011	Musical Romance	4	Juan Leyva	William A. Kaplan	William A. Kaplan & Pinnacle Racing Stable (Adam Lazarus, managing partner)	6 1/2 furlongs	1:16.40	$400,800	II	
2010	Informed Decision	5	Julien R. Leparoux	Jonathan E. Sheppard	Augustin Stable	6 1/2 furlongs	1:15.62	$400,400	III	
2009	Informed Decision	4	Julien R. Leparoux	Jonathan E. Sheppard	Augustin Stable	6 1/2 furlongs	1:15.10	$398,000	III	
2008	Wild Gams	5	Miguel Mena	Benjamin W. Perkins Jr.	New Farm (Everett & Nancy Novak)	6 furlongs	1:07.95	$400,000	Listed	
2007	Miss Macy Sue	4	Eusebio Razo Jr.	Kelly R. Von Hemel	Roll Reroll Stables	6 furlongs	1:08.21	$400,000	Listed	

Legend:
All Weather Track
Notes:
*Artie's Princess finished first in the 2022 running of the race, but in March 2023 the horse was disqualified due to a medication violation. In July 2023, the disqualification was reversed by the Pennsylvania Horse Racing Commission.

== See also ==
- List of American and Canadian Graded races
