= Derby City Distaff Stakes =

Horse race in Kentucky

- Class: Grade I
- Location: Churchill Downs; Louisville, Kentucky, United States
- Inaugurated: 1987 (as Brown and Williamson Handicap)
- Race type: Thoroughbred – Flat racing
- Sponsor: Ford (2026)
- Website: Churchill Downs

Race information
- Distance: 7 furlongs
- Surface: Dirt
- Track: left-handed
- Qualification: Fillies & Mares, four-years-old and older
- Weight: 123 lbs with allowances
- Purse: US$1,000,000 (2024)

The Derby City Distaff Stakes is a Grade I American thoroughbred horse race for fillies and mares aged three and older over a distance of seven furlongs on the dirt held annually in early May on the Kentucky Derby day meeting at Churchill Downs in Louisville, Kentucky during the spring meeting. The current purse is US$1,000,000.

== History ==
The event was inaugurated on May 2, 1987, as the fifth race on the undercard of the Kentucky Derby day meeting as the Brown & Williamson Handicap sponsored by the tobacco company Brown & Williamson, which at the time had their headquarters in Louisville.

The event was a Listed race until 1990 when it was upgraded to Grade III status. It was subsequently upgraded to a Grade II event in 1999 then to its present Grade I status in 2002.

The event's name was changed in 1995 to the Humana Distaff Handicap, sponsored by Humana, an American health insurance company also based in Louisville, Kentucky. In 2007, the event was changed to the Humana Distaff Stakes, and is now run under allowance weight conditions. Humana last year of sponsorship was 2019, with Churchill Downs finding new sponsorship in 2020 with Derby City Gaming.

The first five runnings of the event the winners were ridden by US Hall of Fame jockey Pat Day. Pat Day won another two more runnings of this event before retiring in 2005. In 2015, Churchill Downs renamed the Derby Trial in his honor as the Pat Day Mile which is held on the same day as this event.

Of the more notable winners of this race include 2012 winner Groupie Doll who set a new track record at Churchill Downs for the 7 furlong distance in a time of 1:20.44 and would later that year win the Breeders' Cup Filly & Mare Sprint and be crowned the US Champion Female Sprint Horse.

== Records ==
Speed record

- 1:20.44 – Groupie Doll (2012)

Margins

- 7 1/4 lengths – Groupie Doll (2012)

Most wins

- No horse has won this race more than once.

Most wins by a jockey

- 7 – Pat Day (1987, 1988, 1989, 1990, 1991, 2001, 2004)

Most wins by a trainer

- 3 – Bob Baffert (2006, 2014, 2021)

Most wins by an owner:

- 2 – Juddmonte Farms (2003, 2017)
- 2 – Michael E. Pegram (2006, 2014)
- 2 – Lothenbach Stables (2004, 2020)

== Winners ==
Year	Winner	Age	Jockey	Trainer	Owner	Distance	Time	Purse	Grade	Ref
Derby City Distaff Stakes
2026	R Disaster	5	Tyler Gaffalione	Saffie Joseph Jr.	Averill Racing & ATM Racing	7 furlongs	1:20.94	$923,000	I	
2025	Kopion	4	Kazushi Kimura	Richard E. Mandella	Spendthrift Farm	7 furlongs	1:21.76	$999,600	I	
2024	Vahva	4	Irad Ortiz Jr.	Cherie DeVaux	Belladonna Racing, Edward J. Hudson Jr., West Point Thoroughbreds, LBD Stable, Nice Guys Stables, Manganaro Bloodstock, Runnels Racing, Steve Hornstock & Twin Brook Stables	7 furlongs	1:21.75	$1,000,000	I	
2023	Matareya	4	Flavien Prat	Brad H. Cox	Godolphin	7 furlongs	1:21.87	$750,000	I	
2022	Obligatory	4	José L. Ortiz	William I. Mott	Juddmonte Farm	7 furlongs	1:22.17	$500,000	I	
2021	Gamine	4	John R. Velazquez	Bob Baffert	Michael Lund Petersen	7 furlongs	1:21.50	$500,000	I	
2020	Bell's The One	4	Corey Lanerie	Neil L Pessin	Lothenbach Stables	7 furlongs	1:21.07	$500,000	I	
Humana Distaff Stakes
2019	Mia Mischief	5	Ricardo Santana Jr.	Steven M. Asmussen	Bill & Corine Heiligbrodt, Heider Family Stables, Madaket Stables	7 furlongs	1:22.33	$500,000	I	
2018	American Gal	5	José L. Ortiz	Simon Callaghan	Kaleem Shah	7 furlongs	1:22.33	$300,000	I	
2017	Paulassilverlining	5	José L. Ortiz	Chad C. Brown	Juddmonte Farms	7 furlongs	1:23.68	$300,000	I	
2016	Taris	5	Flavien Prat	Simon Callaghan	Susan Magnier, Michael B. Tabor, Derrick Smith	7 furlongs	1:21.03	$300,000	I	
2015	Dame Dorothy	4	Javier Castellano	Todd A. Pletcher	Bobby Flay	7 furlongs	1:22.67	$300,000	I	
2014	Midnight Lucky	4	Rosie Napravnik	Bob Baffert	Karl Watson, Mike Pegram & Paul Weitman	7 furlongs	1:22.23	$330,600	I	
2013	Aubby K	4	Edgar S. Prado	Ralph E. Nicks	James C. Spence	7 furlongs	1:22.93	$345,600	I	
2012	Groupie Doll	4	Rajiv Maragh	William B. Bradley	Fred F. & William B. Bradley, Carl Hurst & Brent Burns	7 furlongs	1:20.44	$334,500	I	
2011	Sassy Image	4	Robby Albarado	Dale L. Romans	Jerry Romans	7 furlongs	1:21.01	$345,600	I	
2010	Mona de Momma	4	Joel Rosario	John W. Sadler	Michael Talla	7 furlongs	1:22.73	$336,900	I	
2009	Informed Decision	4	Julien R. Leparoux	Jonathan E. Sheppard	Augustin Stable	7 furlongs	1:23.69	$335,400	I	
2008	Intangaroo	4	Alonso Quinonez	Gary Sherlock	Tom Grether Farms	7 furlongs	1:22.03	$334,800	I	
2007	Hystericalady	4	Rafael Bejarano	Jerry Hollendorfer	Rancho San Miguel, Tom Clark, George Todaro & Jerry Hollendorfer	7 furlongs	1:21.87	$340,800	I	
Humana Distaff Handicap
2006	Pussycat Doll	4	Garrett K. Gomez	Bob Baffert	Michael E. Pegram	7 furlongs	1:21.62	$291,000	I	
2005	My Trusty Cat	5	Javier Castellano	David R. Vance	Carl E. Pollard	7 furlongs	1:21.18	$281,750	I	
2004	Mayo On the Side	5	Pat Day	Carl A. Nafzger	Lothenbach Stable	7 furlongs	1:22.78	$272,813	I	
2003	Sightseek	4	Jerry D. Bailey	Robert J. Frankel	Juddmonte Farms	7 furlongs	1:22.12	$222,400	I	
2002	† Celtic Melody	4	Mark Guidry	James A. Jerkens	Vinery Stables	7 furlongs	1:22.98	$228,000	I	
2001	Dream Supreme	4	Pat Day	William I. Mott	Kinsman Stable	7 furlongs	1:20.70	$165,000	II	
2000	Ruby Surprise	5	Joseph C. Judice	Robert E. Holthus	James T. Hines Jr.	7 furlongs	1:21.25	$166,050	II	
1999	Zuppardo Ardo	5	Shane Sellers	Bobby C. Barnett	John A. Franks	7 furlongs	1:23.40	$169,650	II	
1998	Colonial Minstrel	4	John R. Velazquez	Mark A. Hennig	Edward P. Evans	7 furlongs	1:22.12	$115,000	III	
1997	Capote Belle	4	John R. Velazquez	Daniel C. Peitz	Lawana & Robert Low	7 furlongs	1:22.38	$113,000	III	
1996	In Conference	4	Mike E. Smith	Claude R. McGaughey III	Ogden Mills Phipps	7 furlongs	1:23.30	$112,200	III	
1995	Laura's Pistolette	4	Corey Nakatani	Murray W. Johnson	Jack Smith	7 furlongs	1:22.24	$114,500	III	
Brown and Williamson Handicap
1994	Roamin Rachel	4	Mike E. Smith	Claude R. McGaughey III	Tri Honors Stables	7 furlongs	1:23.83	$111,300	III	
1993	Court Hostess	5	Chris McCarron	Neil J. Howard	William S. Kilroy	7 furlongs	1:23.18	$87,000	III	
1992	Ifyoucouldseemenow	4	Craig Perret	Brian A. Mayberry	Jan, Mace & Samantha Siegel	7 furlongs	1:22.22	$87,075	III	
1991	Illeria	4	Pat Day	Michael J. Doyle	Eaton Hall Farm	7 furlongs	1:23.20	$57,850	III	
1990	Medicine Woman	5	Pat Day	George R. Arnold II	Alex Campbell Jr. & Glencrest Farm	7 furlongs	1:23.40	$56,450	III	
1989	Sunshine Always	5	Pat Day	Ernest P. Retamoza Sr.	Jane Martin	7 furlongs	1:24.40	$54,500	Listed	
1988	Le l'Argent	6	Pat Day	Philip M. Hauswald	Fares Farm	7 furlongs	1:22.80	$55,800	Listed	
1987	Lazer Show	4	Pat Day	Donald R. Winfree	James Devaney	7 furlongs	1:22.80	$40,305	Listed	

Notes:
† In the 2002 running, Gold Mover won the race but was disqualified and placed second after stewards ruled she had bumped and interfered with Celtic Melody near the eighth pole.

== See also ==
- Humana Distaff Handicap "top three finishers" and starters
- List of graded stakes at Churchill Downs
- List of American and Canadian Graded races
