= Thoroughbred Club of America Stakes =

- Class: Grade II
- Location: Keeneland Race Course; Lexington, Kentucky
- Inaugurated: 1981 (as Thoroughbred Club Dinner Stakes)
- Race type: Thoroughbred – Flat racing
- Website: Keeneland

Race information
- Distance: 6 furlongs
- Track: Dirt
- Qualification: Fillies and Mares three-year-olds and older
- Weight: Base weights with allowances: 4-year-olds and up: 124 lbs. 3-year-olds: 122 lbs.
- Purse: US$400,000 (2025)
- Bonuses: Breeders' Cup "Win and You're In" - Breeders' Cup Filly & Mare Sprint

The Thoroughbred Club of America Stakes is a Grade II American Thoroughbred horse race for fillies and mares aged three-years-old and older over a distance of six furlongs on the dirt held annually in early October at Keeneland Race Course, Lexington, Kentucky during the fall meeting.

== History ==
Originally raced as the TCA Dinner Purse from 1941 through 1980, the Thoroughbred Owners and Breeders Association Graded Stakes Committee elevated it to a stakes race and held on 15 April 1981, during the spring meeting as the Thoroughbred Club Dinner Stakes. In 1983 the event was renamed to the current Thoroughbred Club of America Stakes.

From 1981 through 1985 the event was restricted to horses whose owner was a member of the club. Dropping that restriction allowed the race to qualify for Graded stakes consideration which it achieved in 1988.

The event was classified Grade III from 1988 through 2008.

In 1995 the event was scheduled in the fall meeting and continues today to be held then.

The event was run on Polytrack synthetic dirt between 2006 and 2013.

Owned by David & Jill Heerensperger and trained by Greg Gilchrist, Indyanne came into the 2008 race as a favorite, having won the Azalea Stakes at Calder Race Course by 9 1/2 lengths before finishing second in the Victory Ride Stakes at Saratoga. With the lead in the Thoroughbred Club of America Stakes coming down the stretch, Indyanne was hard pressed to hold off Wild Gams, Everrett Novak's very fast filly and winner of the 2007 TCA race. Indyanne held on to win by a head in a new stakes record time which still stands.

In 2009 the event was upgraded by the American Graded Stakes Committee to Grade II status.

The Thoroughbred Club of America Stakes is part of the Breeders' Cup Challenge "Win and You're In" program which gives the annual winner entry into the Filly and Mare Sprint.

== Records ==
Speed record:

- 6 furlongs – 1:08.50 Indyanne (2008)

Margins:

- 7 1/2 lengths – Cat Cay (2001)

Most wins:

- 2 – Excitable Lady (1982, 1983)

Most wins by an owner:

- 2 – Tom Gentry (1982, 1983)
- 2 – Frances A. Genter Stable (1988, 1993)
- 2 – Overbrook Farm (1995, 2000)
- 2 – William S. Farish III (2005, 2016)

Most wins by a jockey:

- 5 – Pat Day (1983, 1993, 1996, 1997, 2001)

Most wins by a trainer:

- 2 – C. R. McGaughey III (1985, 2001)
- 2 – D. Wayne Lukas (1995, 2000)
- 2 – Larry Robideaux Jr. (1999, 2002)
- 2 – Wesley A. Ward (2011, 2013)
- 2 – W. Bret Calhoun (2010,2017)
- 2 – Florent Geroux (2018,2022)

== Winners ==
Year	Winner	Age	Jockey	Trainer	Owner	Distance	Time	Purse	Grade	Ref
Thoroughbred Club of America Stakes
2026	Evanescence	4	Jose L. Ortiz	Eddie Kenneally	Green Lantern Stables	6 1/2 furlongs	1:16.57	$400,000	II	
2025	Praying	3	John R. Velazquez	Robert Medina	Newtown Anner Stud Farm	6 furlongs	1:10.49	$398,750	II	
2024	Zeitlos	4	Jose L. Ortiz	Steven M. Asmussen	Stonestreet Stables & Peter Leidel	6 furlongs	1:09.52	$340,125	II	
2023	Yuugiri	4	Flavien Prat	Rodolphe Brisset	Sekie & Tsunebumi Yoshihara	6 furlongs	1:10.44	$350,000	II	
2022	Slammed	4	Florent Geroux	Todd W. Fincher	Brad King, Suzanne Kirby & Barbara M Coleman	6 furlongs	1:10.03	$320,163	II	
2021	Bell's the One	4	Corey Lanerie	Neil Pessin	Lothenbach Stables	6 furlongs	1:08.63	$250,000	II	
2020	Inthemidstofbiz	4	Martin Garcia	Cipriano Contreras	Contreras Stable & Andrew Knapczyk	6 furlongs	1:09.84	$200,000	II	
2019	Spiced Perfection	4	Javier Castellano	Peter L. Miller	Pantofel Stable, Wachtel Stable & Peter Deutsch	6 furlongs	1:10.60	$250,000	II	
2018	Golden Mischief	4	Florent Geroux	Brad H. Cox	Juddmonte Farms	6 furlongs	1:09.39	$250,000	II	
2017	Finley'sluckycharm	4	Brian Hernandez Jr.	W. Bret Calhoun	Carl R. Moore Management	6 furlongs	1:10.01	$250,000	II	
2016	Irish Jasper	4	Julien R. Leparoux	Chad C. Brown	William S. Farish III & David F. Mackie	6 furlongs	1:09.64	$250,000	II	
2015	Fioretti	5	Sophie Doyle	Anthony J. Hamilton Jr.	Two Hearts Farm & Don Janes	6 furlongs	1:10.04	$250,000	II	
2014	Leigh Court	4	Gary Boulanger	Josie Carroll	Melnyk Racing Stables Inc.	6 furlongs	1:09.46	$200,000	II	
2013	Judy the Beauty	4	John R. Velazquez	Wesley A. Ward	Wesley A. Ward	6 furlongs	1:09.23	$200,000	II	
2012	Groupie Doll	4	Rajiv Maragh	William B. Bradley	Fred F. & William B. Bradley, Carl Hurst & Brent Burns	6 furlongs	1:09.21	$200,000	II	
2011	Holiday for Kitten	3	Kendrick Carmouche	Wesley A. Ward	Kenneth and Sarah Ramsey	6 furlongs	1:08.72	$200,000	II	
2010	Dubai Majesty	5	Jamie Theriot	W. Bret Calhoun	Martin Racing Stable & Dan Morgan	6 furlongs	1:09.81	$200,000	II	
2009	Informed Decision	4	Julien R. Leparoux	Jonathan E. Sheppard	Augustin Stable	6 furlongs	1:09.03	$250,000	II	
2008	Indyanne	3	Robby Albarado	Greg Gilchrist	David & Jill Heerensperger	6 furlongs	1:08.50	$300,000	III	
2007	Wild Gams	4	Ramon A. Dominguez	Benjamin W. Perkins Jr.	New Farm	6 furlongs	1:10.00	$300,000	III	
2006	Malibu Mint	4	Kyle Kaenel	James R. Chapman	John R. & Martha Jane Mulholland	6 furlongs	1:08.71	$300,000	III	
2005	Reunited	3	Robby Albarado	Neil J. Howard	William S. Farish III	6 furlongs	1:11.59	$300,000	III	
2004	Molto Vita	4	Rafael Bejarano	Dallas Stewart	John D. Gunther	6 furlongs	1:09.92	$125,000	III	
2003	Summer Mis	4	Rene R. Douglas	Anthony Mitchell	Richard Otto Stables	6 furlongs	1:09.77	$125,000	III	
2002	French Riviera	3	Donnie Meche	Larry Robideaux Jr.	Barnett Stables	6 furlongs	1:09.75	$125,000	III	
2001	Cat Cay	4	Pat Day	Claude R. McGaughey III	Ogden Phipps	6 furlongs	1:09.24	$109,000	III	
2000	Katz Me If You Can	3	Jorge F. Chavez	D. Wayne Lukas	Overbrook Farm	6 furlongs	1:09.42	$108,700	III	
1999	†Cinemine	4	Eddie Martin Jr.	Larry Robideaux Jr.	Nolan Creek Farm	6 furlongs	1:08.86	$100,000	III	
1998	Bourbon Belle	3	Willie Martinez	Peter W. Salmen Jr.	Donna Salmen, Susan Bunning & Highland Farms	6 furlongs	1:08.70	$100,000	III	
1997	Sky Blue Pink	3	Pat Day	Thomas M. Amoss	Mrs. Morton Rosenthal	6 furlongs	1:10.06	$100,000	III	
1996	Surprising Fact	3	Pat Day	Joseph H. Pierce Jr.	G. Watts Humphrey Jr.	6 furlongs	1:10.14	$100,000	III	
1995	Cat Appeal	3	Donna M. Barton	D. Wayne Lukas	Overbrook Farm	6 furlongs	1:10.02	$75,000	III	
1994	Tenacious Tiffany	4	Craig Perret	Jimmy Croll	M. R. P. Stable	6 furlongs	1:11.00	$75,000	III	
1993	Jeano	5	Pat Day	Carl A. Nafzger	Frances A. Genter Stable	6 furlongs	1:09.39	$75,000	III	
1992	Ifyoucouldseemenow	4	Craig Perret	Brian A. Mayberry	Jan, Mace, & Samantha Siegel	6 furlongs	1:09.67	$75,000	III	
1991	Avie Jane	7	Craig Perret	Gene A. Lotti Jr.	Tony Canonie Jr. & Tony Canonie Sr.	6 furlongs	1:10.24	$75,000	III	
1990	Safely Kept	4	Craig Perret	Alan E. Goldberg	Jayeff-B Stable & Barry Weisbord	6 furlongs	1:10.40	$75,000	III	
1989	Plate Queen	4	Randy Romero	J. Bert Sonnier	Saron Stable	6 furlongs	1:11.20	$75,000	III	
1988	Tappiano	4	Jacinto Vasquez	Flint S. Schulhofer	Frances A. Genter Stable	6 furlongs	1:10.20	$75,000	III	
1987	‡There Are Rainbows	7	Ronnie Fletcher	Danny W. Whited	Mildred Fike	6 furlongs	1:11.00	$50,000		
1986	Zenobia Empress	5	Earlie Fires	Joseph M. Bollero	Russell Fortune Jr.	6 furlongs	1:11.80	$50,000		
1985	Boldara	4	Phil Rubbicco	Claude R. McGaughey III	George A. Hoskins	6 furlongs	1:10.80	$50,000		
1984	Bids and Blades	3	Don Brumfield	Richard J. Gallagher	Mrs. James H. Gallagher	6 furlongs	1:11.60	$50,000		
1983	Excitable Lady	5	Pat Day	Eduardo Inda	Tom Gentry	6 furlongs	1:09.80	$40,000		
Thoroughbred Club Dinner Stakes
1982	Excitable Lady	4	Darrel McHargue	Ronald McAnally	Tom Gentry	6 furlongs	1:09.20	$36,100		
1981	Gold Treasure	4	Mark Sellers	John J. Weipert	Keswick Stable	6 furlongs	1:10.20	$30,000		

Legend:
All Weather Track Dirt
Notes:
† In the 1999 running the 3/5 odds on favorite Bourbon Belle lugged in the final 1/16 furlong of the event and interfered with Cinemine who finished second. Stewards disqualified Bourbon Belle and was placed second and Cinemine was declared the winner.
‡ In the 1987 running Zigbelle finished first but was disqualified and placed fourth for bumping the fourth-place finisher Ten Thousand Stars on the turn. There Are Rainbows was declared the winner, Weekend Delight was placed second and Ten Thousand Stars placed third.

== See also ==
- List of American and Canadian Graded races
