= Groupie Doll =

American-bred Thoroughbred racehorse

- Sire: Bowman's Band
- Grandsire: Dixieland Band
- Dam: Deputy Doll
- Damsire: Silver Deputy
- Sex: Mare
- Foaled: 2008
- Country: United States
- Colour: Chestnut
- Breeder: Fred F. Bradley & William Bradley
- Owner: Fred F. Bradley, William B. Bradley, Brent Burns & Carl Hurst
- Trainer: William B. Bradley
- Record: 23:12-4-4
- Earnings: $2,648,850

Major wins
- Gardenia Stakes (2011); Madison Stakes (2012); Humana Distaff Handicap (2012); Presque Isle Downs Masters Stakes (2012, 2013); Thoroughbred Club of America Stakes (2012) Breeders' Cup wins: Breeders' Cup Filly & Mare Sprint (2012, 2013)

Awards
- American Champion Female Sprint Horse (2012, 2013)

Honours
- Groupie Doll Stakes (Ellis Park)

Groupie Doll (foaled April 14, 2008) is an American Thoroughbred racehorse. A specialist sprinter, she is best known for winning the Breeders' Cup Filly & Mare Sprint in 2012 and 2013. Unraced as a two-year-old she showed good form as a three-year-old in 2011, winning three races including the Gardenia Stakes. In 2012, she emerged as a world-class sprinter, winning the Madison Stakes, Humana Distaff Handicap, Presque Isle Downs Masters Stakes, and Thoroughbred Club of America Stakes before taking the Breeders' Cup Filly & Mare Sprint. In 2013 she repeated in the Masters Stakes and won a second Breeders' Cup. She was then sold as a prospective broodmare for $3.1 million. Her new owner chose to keep her in training into early 2014, running her against males in the Cigar Mile, and then in the Hurricane Bertie Stakes, where she won the final race of her career, to be retired and become a broodmare.

== Background ==
Groupie Doll is a chestnut mare with a small white star bred in Kentucky by the Frankfort-based father and son team of Fred and William "Buff" Bradley who also bred and raced Brass Hat. She is by far the most successful racehorse sired by Bowman's Band, a Kentucky-bred stallion whose biggest win on the track came in the 2003 Meadowlands Breeders' Cup Stakes. Groupie Doll's dam Deputy Doll won two minor races, and was a great-great-great-granddaughter of the influential broodmare Boudoir, whose other descendants include Graustark, His Majesty, Secreto, Majestic Prince, Real Quiet and Daiwa Major.

During her racing career, the mare was owned by the Bradleys in partnership with Brent Burns and Carl Hurst and trained by Buff Bradley. Groupie Doll usually raced in a white hood.

== Racing career ==
=== 2011: three-year-old season ===
Groupie Doll began her racing career as a three-year-old in Kentucky. After finishing unplaced on her debut at Churchill Downs she recorded her first success by winning a maiden race over six and a half furlongs at the same venue in June. She then moved to Ellis Park Race Course where she won a seven furlong allowance race before being moved up in class and distance for the one mile Grade III Gardenia Stakes. Ridden by Greta Kuntweiler, she took the lead in the straight and won by three lengths from Secret File. She then finished second, carrying top weight in the Charles Town Oaks and second again, to the Brazilian filly Great Hot in the Grade II Raven Run Stakes at Keeneland. When tried over a longer distance in November she failed to reproduce her earlier form and finished unplaced behind Marketing Mix in the Grade II Mrs. Revere Stakes at Churchill Downs. Groupie Doll was sent to Florida and dropped in class for her final appearance of the year, winning an allowance race at Gulfstream Park on December 22.

=== 2012: four-year-old season ===
Groupie Doll's four-year-old season began with three consecutive defeats at Gulfstream. She finished second to the Grade-I-winning colt Boys At Tosconanova in a one-mile allowance race in January, third to Awesome Maria and Royal Delta in the Grade III Sabin Stakes in February, and third behind Musical Romance in the Grade II Inside Information Stakes in March. In the last of these races, she was partnered by Rajiv Maragh, who rode her in all her subsequent races.

Groupie Doll won her next five races. Racing on the Polytrack surface at Keeneland on April 12, she recorded her first Grade I victory when she defeated seven opponents in the Grade I Vinery Madison Stakes in which she wore blinkers for the first time. Starting at odds of 3.9/1, she took the lead a furlong out and won by three lengths from She's Cheeky. Maragh said that the filly "finished with a lot of power. She was long gone by the eighth pole". In May, she won another Grade I when she took the Humana Distaff Stakes on the dirt at Churchill Downs. On this occasion, she took the lead halfway through the seven-furlong event and drew away in the straight to win by seven and a quarter lengths from Musical Romance. The winning time of 1:20.44 was a new track record.

After a four-month break, during which her training was disrupted by a hock injury, the filly returned in September and won the Grade II Presque Isle Downs Masters Stakes over six and a half furlongs on Tapeta. On October 6 at Keeneland, she started 2/5 favorite for the Grade II Thoroughbred Club of America Stakes over six furlongs and won by six and a half lengths from Strike The Moon. On November 3, Groupie Doll started the 4/6 favourite for the Breeders' Cup Filly and Mare Sprint over six furlongs on dirt at Santa Anita Park. Her opponents were headed by Dust and Diamonds, the winner of the Gallant Bloom Handicap at Belmont Park, and also included Strike The Moon, Great Hot, and Musical Romance. Drawn ninth of the ten runners, Groupie Doll raced on the wide outside in the first quarter mile. She moved forward on the final turn, took the lead in mid-stretch, and pulled away to win by four and a half lengths from Dust and Diamonds. After the race, Buff Bradley said, "We started with her from before she was born. My dad has worked a long time for this and we worked a lot of hours on the farm, and we've seen a lot of them not make it to the races. When you get here you know how special it is, and to be able to have one and keep this one healthy all through the campaign is exceptional.” Three weeks after her Breeders' Cup win, Groupie Doll was matched against colts in the Cigar Mile Handicap at Aqueduct Racetrack. Starting the 21/20 favorite, she took the lead in the straight but was caught on the wire and beaten a nose by Stay Thirsty.

=== 2013: five-year-old season ===
Groupie Doll missed the first half of the 2013 and did not appear until August, when she attempted to repeat her 2011 success in the Gardenia Stakes. She started the 1/5 favorite, but after stumbling at the start she finished third behind Devious Intent and Magic Hour. A month later, she won her second Masters Stakes at Presque Isle Downs, taking the lead inside the final furlong and winning by one and a half lengths from Purely Hot with the Canadian-bred four-year-old Judy the Beauty in third. On October 2, the mare started 1/2 favorite for the Thoroughbred Club of America Stakes at Keeneland but after Maragh was unable to obtain a clear run in the straight she finished third behind Judy the Beauty and Gypsy Robin.

On November 2 Groupie Doll defended her Breeders' Cup Filly & Mare Sprint title at Santa Anita. She was made the 7/2 favorite ahead of Dance Card (Gazelle Stakes), Sweet Lulu (Test Stakes), Dance To Bristol (Ballerina Stakes) and Judy the Beauty. For the second year in succession, Groupie Doll was drawn on the outside and had to race wide in the early stages. She took the lead in the straight and held off the late challenge of Judy the Beauty to win by half a length, with Dance Card half a length back in third. After the race, a visibly emotional Buff Bradley said; "She's the best, I'm so glad she got to show that today. No one on my team ever lost confidence in her. We've always known how good she is."

Less than a week after her second Breeders' Cup win, Groupie Doll was auctioned at the Keeneland November Breeding Stock Sale. The bidding reached $3.1 million before she was sold to Mandy Pope's Whisper Hill Farm. It was announced that she would be sent to begin her career as a broodmare at the Timber Town stables at Lexington, Kentucky. However, before retiring to be a broodmare, she was raced again in 2013 in the Cigar Mile Handicap at Aqueduct on November 30. She finished fourth behind Flat Out after being denied a clear run in the straight.

On February 9, 2014, she decisively won her final race, the Hurricane Bertie Stakes.

== Assessment and Honors ==
In the 2012 edition of the World Thoroughbred Rankings, Groupie Doll was rated the 46th best racehorse in the world, the best sprinter on dirt, the best sprinter in North America and the third best female sprinter in the world behind Black Caviar and Atlantic Jewel. In the Eclipse Awards for 2012 she was voted American Champion Female Sprint Horse taking 250 of the 254 votes. She was again voted Champion Female Sprinter for 2013 beating Mizdirection by 195 votes to 45.

In 2015, Ellis Park renamed the Gardenia Stakes, which she had won in 2011, in her honor. It is Ellis Park's only graded stakes race. "Everybody I spoke with thought it was the right thing to do", said the racing secretary of Ellis Park, Dan Bork. "As much as I hate to change the name of the Gardenia, if there's one horse that deserves it – a mare – it would be her."

== Retirement ==
On March 5, 2015, Groupie Doll delivered her first foal, a colt by Tapit about a week before her original March 11 due date, Wayne Sweezey of Timber Town Stable confirmed March 28. There was a problem with the delivery and the premature colt was rushed immediately to Rood & Riddle Equine Hospital near Lexington for critical nursing care. Groupie Doll recovered well from foaling and did not display any post-delivery issues. Under the care of Dr Bonnie Barr, the colt was initially too weak to stand or nurse, but made great progress since the first couple of weeks and was eventually released. Groupie Doll was bred back to Tapit for a 2016 foal. She had five consecutive foals by Tapit, three of whom started and two of whom won one race each. She delivered a colt by Triple Crown winner Justify in 2020 and was bred to leading sire Into Mischief in that year, but failed to produce a live foal.

== Pedigree ==
Pedigree of Groupie Doll (USA), chestnut mare, 2008
Sire Bowman's Band (USA) 1998	Dixieland Band (USA); 1980	Northern Dancer	Nearctic
Sire Bowman's Band (USA) 1998	Dixieland Band (USA); 1980	Northern Dancer	Natalma
Sire Bowman's Band (USA) 1998	Dixieland Band (USA); 1980	Mississippi Mud	Delta Judge
Sire Bowman's Band (USA) 1998	Dixieland Band (USA); 1980	Mississippi Mud	Sand Buggy
Sire Bowman's Band (USA) 1998	Hometown Queen (USA); 1984	Pleasant Colony	His Majesty
Sire Bowman's Band (USA) 1998	Hometown Queen (USA); 1984	Pleasant Colony	Sun Colony
Sire Bowman's Band (USA) 1998	Hometown Queen (USA); 1984	Nijinsky Star	Nijinsky
Sire Bowman's Band (USA) 1998	Hometown Queen (USA); 1984	Nijinsky Star	Chris Evert
Dam Deputy Doll (USA) 1996	Silver Deputy (USA); 1985	Deputy Minister	Vice Regent
Dam Deputy Doll (USA) 1996	Silver Deputy (USA); 1985	Deputy Minister	Mint Copy
Dam Deputy Doll (USA) 1996	Silver Deputy (USA); 1985	Silver Valley	Mr. Prospector
Dam Deputy Doll (USA) 1996	Silver Deputy (USA); 1985	Silver Valley	Seven Valleys
Dam Deputy Doll (USA) 1996	Slick Turn (USA); 1984	Best Turn	Turn-To
Dam Deputy Doll (USA) 1996	Slick Turn (USA); 1984	Best Turn	Sweet Clementine
Dam Deputy Doll (USA) 1996	Slick Turn (USA); 1984	Bold Flora	Bold Favorite
Dam Deputy Doll (USA) 1996	Slick Turn (USA); 1984	Bold Flora	Floral Park (Family 4-d)
