= Miss Preakness Stakes top three finishers =

This is a listing of the horses that finished in either first, second, or third place and the number of starters in the Miss Preakness Stakes, a Grade 3 race for fillies age three run at six forlongs on the dirt held at Pimlico Race Course in Baltimore, Maryland.

Year	Winner	Second	Third	Starters
2026	Peach Tie	Tessellate	Little Miss Curlin	5
2025	Echo Sound	You”ll Be Back	Hollygrove	11
2024	Mystic Lake	Youalmosthadme	Discreet Ops	12
2023	Maple Leaf Mel	Topsy	L Street Lady	6
2022	Lady Scarlet	Happy Soul	Gimmick	6
2021	Red Ghost	Euphoric	Joyful Cadence	9
2020	Wicked Whisper	Ain't No Elmers	Sound Machine	7
2019	Covfefe	Please Flatter Me	Tomlin	9
2018	Happy Like a Fool	Artistic Diva	Buy Sell Hold	9
2017	Vertical Oak	Our Majesty	My Miss Chiff	14
2016	Lost Raven	One True Kiss	Quick Release	10
2015	Irish Jasper	Huasca	Coco's Wildcat	11
2014	Miss Behavior	Stirmy Novel	Jojo Warrior	10
2013	I'm Mom's Favorite	Flattering Bea	Lighthouse Bay	11
2012	Agave Kiss	Millionreasonswhy	Ageless	7
2011	R Holiday Mood	Strike the Moon	Bold Affair	10
2010	Vindy City	Imanheiress	Argent Affair	5
2009	Heart Ashley	Cinderella's Wish	Trophy Collector	5
2008	Palanka City	Casanova Killer	Beau's Valentine	7
2007	Time's Mistress	Silver Knockers	Richwoman	7
2006	Wildcat Bettie B	Press Camp	G City Gal	7
2005	Burnish	Partners Due	Hot Storm	7
2004	Forest Music	Stephan's Angel	Fall Fashion	11
2003	Belong to Sea	Chimichurri	Forever Partners	5
2002	Vesta	Willa On the Move	Shameful	6
2001	Kimbralata	Carafe	Stormy Pick	6
2000	Lucki Livi	Big Bambu	Swept Away	5
1999	Hookedonthefeelin	Silent Valay	Paula's Girl	4
1998	Storm Beauty	Brac Drifter	Hair Spray	5
1997	Weather Vane	Move	Cayman Sunset	8
1996	Nic's Halo	Palette Knife	Crafty But Sweet	4
1995	Lilly Capote	Broad Smile	Norstep	7
1994	Foolish Kisses	Aly's Conquest	Platinum Punch	8
1993	My Rosa	Fighting Jet	Code Blum	5
1992	Toots La Mae	Missy White Oak	Jazzy One	6
1991	Missy's Music	Dixie Rouge	Accent Knightly	6
1990	Love Me a Lot	Dixie Landera	Tabs	6
1989	Montoya	Another Boom	Cojinx	7
1988	Caromine	Light Beat	Saved by Grace	9
1987	Cutlasse	I'm Out	Pelican Bay	8
1986	Marion's Madel	Zigbelle	Babling Brook	8

== See also ==
- Pimlico Race Course
- List of graded stakes at Pimlico Race Course
