= Miss Preakness Stakes =

- Class: Grade III
- Location: Pimlico Race Course, Baltimore, Maryland, United States
- Inaugurated: 1986
- Race type: Thoroughbred – Flat racing
- Website: www.preakness.com

Race information
- Distance: 6 furlongs
- Surface: Dirt
- Track: left-handed
- Qualification: Three-year-old fillies
- Weight: 124 lbs with allowances
- Purse: $150,000

The Miss Preakness Stakes is a Grade III American Thoroughbred horse race for three-year-old fillies over a distance of six furlongs on the dirt held annually run on Black-Eyed Susan Stakes Day at the Pimlico Race Course in Baltimore, Maryland as a stakes feature of the undercard. The event offers a purse of $150,000 added.

== History ==
The race was first carded in its inaugural running in 1986. It became graded for the first time in 2002 by the American Graded Stakes Committee. The race was simply called the Miss Preakness Stakes from 1986 through 2003. The race was renamed with sponsorship in 2004 to the "Adena Stallions Miss Preakness Stakes".

== Sponsorship ==
From 2015 to 2019 the event was sponsored by Adena Springs, a breeding operation owned by Magna Entertainment Corporation Chairman, Frank Stronach. Adena Stallions' are the breeding stock stallions at Adena Springs including: Ghostzapper, Macho Uno, Giacomo, Congaree, Awesome Again and Touch Gold in Midway, Kentucky. Adena Springs stallions standing in Ocala, Florida includes Red Bullet, Milwaukee Brew, and Alphabet Soup. Adena Springs has donated a 2017 no guarantee breeding season to point of entry for the winning entry.

== Records ==
Speed record:

- 1:07.70 – Covfefe (2019)

Margins:

- 8 1/2 lengths – Covfefe (2019)

Most wins by a jockey:

- 4 – Chris McCarron (1986, 1987, 1988 & 1990)

Most wins by a trainer:

- 3 – D. Wayne Lukas (1995, 1998, & 2007)
- 3 – Todd Pletcher (2000, 2011, 2016)

Most wins by an owner:

- no owner has won this race more than once.

== Winners of The Miss Preakness Stakes ==
| Year | Winner | Jockey | Trainer | Owner | Dist. | Time | Purse | Grade |
|---|---|---|---|---|---|---|---|---|
| 2026 | Peach Tie | Sheldon Russell | Brittany T. Russell | Estate of Brereton C. Jones | 6 fur. | 1:11.87 | $148,500 | III |
| 2025 | Echo Sound | Luis Saez | George R. Arnold II | Gabriel Duignan | 6 fur. | 1:11.14 | $150,000 | III |
| 2024 | Mystic Lake | Flavien Prat | Saffie Joseph Jr. | C Two Racing & Stefania Farm | 6 fur. | 1:11.40 | $150,000 | III |
| 2023 | Maple Leaf Mel | Joel Rosario | Jeremiah C. Englehart | August Dawn Farm | 6 fur. | 1:09.56 | $150,000 | III |
| 2022 | Lady Scarlet | Irad Ortiz Jr. | Michael J. Maker | Paradise Farms Corp. & David Staudacher | 6 fur. | 1:10.07 | $150,000 | III |
| 2021 | Red Ghost | John R. Velazquez | Wesley A. Ward | Douglas Scharbauer | 6 fur. | 1:10.53 | $150,000 | III |
| 2020 | Wicked Whisper | Joe Bravo | Steven Asmussen | Alex & JoAnn Lieblong | 6 fur. | 1:10.36 | $150,000 | III |
| 2019 | Covfefe | Javier Castellano | Brad Cox | LNJ Foxwoods | 6 fur. | 1:07.70 | $150,000 | III |
| 2018 | Happy Like a Fool | Tyler Gaffalione | Wesley A. Ward | Michael B. Tabor | 6 fur. | 1:10.12 | $150,000 | III |
| 2017 | Vertical Oak | José Ortiz | Steven Asmussen | J. Kirk & Judy Robison | 6 fur. | 1:10.06 | $150,000 | III |
| 2016 | Lost Raven | John Velazquez | Todd Pletcher | Repole Stable | 6 fur. | 1:11.43 | $150,000 | III |
| 2015 | Irish Jasper | Kendrick Carmouche | Derek S. Ryan | Derek S. Ryan | 6 fur. | 1:10.78 | $150,000 | III |
| 2014 | Miss Behavior | Sheldon Russell | Phil Schoenthal | MacWilliam & Teitalbaum | 6 fur. | 1:10.85 | $100,000 | III |
| 2013 | I'm Mom's Favorite | Sheldon Russell | Anthony Dutrow | JZ Racing Stable | 6 fur. | 1:12.51 | $100,000 | III |
| 2012 | Agave Kiss | Ramon Domínguez | Rudy Rodriguez | Flying Zee Racing Stables | 6 fur. | 1:10.40 | $100,000 | III |
| 2011 | R Holiday Mood | John R. Velazquez | Todd Pletcher | E.P. Robsham Stables | 6 fur. | 1:12.12 | $75,000 | III |
| 2010 | Vindy City | Kendrick Carmouche | John Servis | Marchfore Thoroughbreds | 6 fur. | 1:11.72 | $70,000 | III |
| 2009 | Heart Ashley | Garrett Gomez | Steve Ashley | Zayat Stables | 6 fur. | 1:10.79 | $100,000 | III |
| 2008 | Palanka City | Christopher Emigh | Terry Gestes | William Stiritz | 6 fur. | 1:10.90 | $100,000 | III |
| 2007 | Time's Mistress | Mark Guidry | D. Wayne Lukas | Charles L. Kidder | 6 fur. | 1:10.53 | $125,000 | III |
| 2006 | Wildcat Bettie B | Ramon Domínguez | J. Larry Jones | Oasis Racing LLC | 6 fur. | 1:10.05 | $125,000 | III |
| 2005 | Burnish | Rafael Bejarano | Nick Zito | Arthur B. Hancock III | 6 fur. | 1:36.00 | $113,100 | III |
| 2004 | Forest Music | Ramon Domínguez | Mark Shuman | Twin Hopes Farm Inc. | 6 fur. | 1:10.97 | $100,000 | III |
| 2003 | Belong to Sea | Javier Castellano | Lisa Lewis | Stev.Duncker & Hudson Riv.Farms | 6 fur. | 1:11.10 | $100,000 | III |
| 2002 | Vesta | Mario Pino | Joseph Aquilino | Farnsworth Farms | 6 fur. | 1:10.25 | $100,000 | III |
| 2001 | Kimbralata | Travis Dunkelburger | Dale Capuano | Donald Mensh | 6 fur. | 1:11.20 | $100,000 | |
| 2000 | Lucky Livi | Rick Wilson | Todd Pletcher | Anstu Stables, Inc. | 6 fur. | 1:10.00 | $100,000 | |
| 1999 | Hookedonthefeelin | Gary Stevens | Bob Baffert | Michael E. Pegram | 6 fur. | 1:11.26 | $100,000 | |
| 1998 | Storm Beauty | Charles Woods Jr. | D. Wayne Lukas | Brushwood Stable | 6 fur. | 1:10.81 | $75,000 | |
| 1997 | Weather Vane | Mario Pino | Richard W. Delp | Par Four Racing Stable | 6 fur. | 1:11.94 | $107,890 | |
| 1996 | Nic's Halo | Rick Wilson | William Badgett | Not Found | 6 fur. | 1:11.75 | $54,425 | |
| 1995 | Lilly Capote | Gary Stevens | D. Wayne Lukas | Audley Farm, Inc. | 6 fur. | 1:10.90 | $54,400 | |
| 1994 | Foolish Kisses | Edgar Prado | James W. Murphy | Charles McGinnes | 6 fur. | 1:12.45 | $54,550 | |
| 1993 | My Rosa | Edgar Prado | Francis Campitelli | Not Found | 6 fur. | 1:11.33 | $53,625 | |
| 1992 | Toots La Mae | Joe Bravo | Mark Reid | Someday Farm | 6 fur. | 1:11.97 | $44,175 | |
| 1991 | Missy's Music | Mario Pino | Richard W. Delp | James W. Wilson | 6 fur. | 1:11.48 | $26,625 | |
| 1990 | Love Me a Not | Chris McCarron | Tom Garry | Tom Garry & Bill Garry | 6 fur. | 1:11.40 | $31,950 | |
| 1989 | Montoya | Laffit Pincay Jr. | James W. Murphy | Not Found | 6 fur. | 1:10.60 | $37,500 | |
| 1988 | Caromine | Chris McCarron | Hank Allen | Ed Seltzer & Earle I. Mack | 6 fur. | 1:13.00 | $41,520 | |
| 1987 | Cutlasse | Chris McCarron | Vinnie Blengs | Not Found | 6 fur. | 1:12.60 | $35,265 | |
| 1986 | Marion's Madel | Chris McCarron | Franklin J. Hendricks | Not Found | 6 fur. | 1:12.80 | $35,100 | |

== See also ==
- Black-Eyed Susan Stakes
- List of American and Canadian Graded races
- List of graded stakes at Pimlico Race Course
- Miss Preakness Stakes "top three finishers" and starters
- Pimlico Race Course
- Preakness Stakes
- Thoroughbred Owners and Breeders Association
