= Musical Romance (horse) =

- Sire: Concorde's Tune
- Grandsire: Concorde Bound
- Dam: Candelightdinner
- Damsire: Slew Gin Fiz
- Sex: Mare
- Foaled: 2007
- Country: United States
- Color: Dark Bay/Brown
- Breeder: Ocala Stud
- Owner: William A. Kaplan & Pinnacle Racing Stable
- Trainer: William A. Kaplan
- Record: 41: 12-6-8
- Earnings: US$1,681,885

Major wins
- Sweettrickydancer Stakes (2010); U Can Do It Handicap (2011); Ema Bovary Stakes (2011); Barb's Dancer Stakes (2011); Presque Isle Downs Masters Stakes (2011); Inside Information Stakes (2012); Princess Rooney Handicap (2012); Mike Sherman Memorial Stakes (2012) Breeders' Cup wins: Breeders' Cup Filly & Mare Sprint (2011)

Awards
- Florida Horse of the Year (2011); American Champion Female Sprint Horse (2011)

Musical Romance (foaled 2007 in Florida) is an American Thoroughbred racehorse best known for winning the Breeders' Cup Filly & Mare Sprint in 2011. Ridden by Juan Leyva, she was trained by Bill Kaplan, co-owner with the Pinnacle Racing Stable headed by managing partner Adam Lazarus.

== Background ==
Bred in Florida by the O'Farrell family's Ocala Stud, Musical Romance was sired by Concorde's Tune and out of the mare Candlelightdinner, by Slew Gin Fizz. While not from the most fashionable of bloodlines, her Breeders' Cup biography says that "speedsters abound in her family tree."

Musical Romance was purchased for $22,000 by Adam Lazarus and trainer Bill Kaplan at the 2009 Ocala Breeders' Sales Company sale of juveniles. Lazarus then sold shares in his fifty percent to a group of investors. During her second day of training, Musical Romance suffered a fracture of the pastern, the part of the leg between the fetlock and the hoof.

== Racing career ==
The injury meant it was not until September 19, 2009, that Musical Romance could make her racing debut at Calder Race Course, a Florida facility where she remained for all her starts as a two-year-old. Beginning with three events for maidens, she finished third then fourth before getting her first win on October 23. Beaten in her next three starts, Musical Romance began her three-year-old campaign on January 23, 2010, at Gulfstream Park with a victory in an allowance race. Four starts later she got her first stakes win in Calder's Sweettrickydancer Stakes. She ended 2010 with one more win in an allowance optional claiming race plus she earned two seconds and three third-place finishes in other stakes races.

=== 2011 Championship year ===
Having previously been raced almost exclusively at distances of 1 1/16 to 1 1/8 miles at age three, trainer Bill Kaplan entered Musical Romance in sprint distances beginning in 2011. Racing at Gulfstream Park and Calder Race Course, between January 1 and April 10 of 2011 Musical Romance made five starts, finishing fourth three times and fifth in the two others. However, she began to show her preference for the shorter distances and ran best when she lay off the pace until making a move coming down the stretch.

Musical Romance had a second-place result in the Hollywood Wildcat Handicap before winning the Ema Bovary Stakes and the U Can Do It Handicap. Moved up to top-level competition in Calder's Grade 1 Princess Rooney Handicap she ran second by a neck to Sassy Image then, still at Calder, followed up with a win in the Barb's Dancer Stakes. In September, Musical Romance was shipped to Pennsylvania's Presque Isle Downs for the $400,000 Masters Stakes. Run at 6 1/2 furlongs on an all weather track, she got her first Grade 2 stakes win. In her next start at Keeneland in Lexington, Kentucky, she ran second in the 6 furlong Thoroughbred Club of America Stakes to Holiday for Kitten owned by Ken and Sarah Ramsey. At this point, Musical Romance had earned close to $700,000 for her owners who made the decision to pay a $130,000 supplemental fee to enter her in the million dollar Breeders' Cup Filly & Mare Sprint to be run November 4 at Churchill Downs in Louisville, Kentucky. Riding in his first ever Breeders' Cup race, Musical Romance's regular jockey Juan Leyva immediately moved her to be on the rail by the time the horses reached the first turn. Running behind the early leader until coming down the stretch for home, she charged between the two front runners to win by 1 1/4 lengths and take first money of $540,000.

Musical Romance would be voted the Eclipse Award as the 2011 American Champion Female Sprint Horse and named Florida's 2011 Horse of the Year.

=== 2012, the final year of racing and sale ===
In 2012, the now five-year-old Musical Romance won the Grade 1 Princess Rooney Handicap and the Mike Sherman Memorial Stakes at Calder Race Course plus the Grade 2 Inside Information Stakes at Gulfstream Park. She returned to defend her title in the Breeders' Cup Filly & Mare Sprint, hosted in 2012 by California's Santa Anita Park. Musical Romance struggled and never threatened the leaders, finishing far back in sixth behind winner Groupie Doll.

Musical Romance was sold in the November 5, 2012 Fasig-Tipton sale for $1.6 million. She was purchased by the prominent Japanese breeder Katsumi Yoshida to stand as a broodmare at his Northern Farm on the island of Hokkaido in Japan.

As of 2021, Musical Romance was produced three foals by Deep Impact and another by Heart's Cry.

== Pedigree ==
Pedigree of Musical Romance, dark bay mare, 2007
Sire Concorde's Tune	Concorde Bound	Super Concorde	Bold Reasoning
Sire Concorde's Tune	Concorde Bound	Super Concorde	Prime Abord
Sire Concorde's Tune	Concorde Bound	Grey Sister	Iron Ruler
Sire Concorde's Tune	Concorde Bound	Grey Sister	Grey Sibling
Sire Concorde's Tune	Parisian Tune	Tunerup	The Pruner
Sire Concorde's Tune	Parisian Tune	Tunerup	Our Girl
Sire Concorde's Tune	Parisian Tune	Paris or Bust	Francis S.
Sire Concorde's Tune	Parisian Tune	Paris or Bust	Pride of Paris
Dam Candelightdinner	Slew Gin Fiz	Relaunch	In Reality
Dam Candelightdinner	Slew Gin Fiz	Relaunch	Foggy Note
Dam Candelightdinner	Slew Gin Fiz	Slew Princess	Seattle Slew
Dam Candelightdinner	Slew Gin Fiz	Slew Princess	Lillian Russell
Dam Candelightdinner	Romantic Dinner	Who's For Dinner	Native Charger
Dam Candelightdinner	Romantic Dinner	Who's For Dinner	Expectancy
Dam Candelightdinner	Romantic Dinner	Victorious Meg	Soy Numero Uno
Dam Candelightdinner	Romantic Dinner	Victorious Meg	Cricket Club (family: 10-a)
