= Groupie Doll Stakes =

American Thoroughbred horse race

- Class: Listed
- Location: Ellis Park Race Course; Henderson, Kentucky, United States
- Inaugurated: 1982 (as Gardenia Handicap)
- Race type: Thoroughbred – Flat racing
- Website: ellisparkracing.com

Race information
- Distance: 1 mile (8 furlongs)
- Surface: Dirt
- Track: left-handed
- Qualification: Three-year-olds & Up fillies & Mares
- Weight: Assigned
- Purse: $150,000

The Groupie Doll Stakes is an American Thoroughbred horse race held annually in early August at Ellis Park Race Course in Henderson, Kentucky. The event is open to three-year-olds & up fillies and mares. It is run at one mile (8 furlongs) on a conventional dirt surface. The race itself was initially named for the flower used in the winner's garland.

== History ==
The race was first run in 1982 as the 'Gardenia Stakes / Gardenia Handicap' The race is now named after the 2011 winner; Groupie Doll. It first became a Grade III race in 1988 and was demoted to a Listed race in 2019.

== Records ==
Speed record

- 1 mile – 1:34.97 – Devious Intent (2013)
- 1 1/8 miles – 1:47.60 – Lt. Lao (1988)

Most wins by a trainer

- 3 – Dale Romans (2004, 2008, 2014)
- 3 – Brad H. Cox (2015, 2017, 2021)

Most wins by a Jockey

- 3 – Larry Melancon (1990, 2007, 2009)
- 2 – Mark Guidry (2001, 2004)

== Winners ==
Groupie Doll Stakes winners
Year	Winner	Age	Jockey	Trainer	Owner	Dist. (Miles)	Time	Gr.
2022	Li'l Tootsie	5	Edgar Morales	Thomas M. Amoss	Joel Politi	1-mile	1:37.42	Listed
2021	Matera	5	Florent Geroux	Brad H. Cox	Don Alberto Stables	1-mile	1:36.41	Listed
2020	Lady Kate	5	Florent Geroux	Eddie Kenneally	Anderson Stables	1-mile	1:35.89	Listed
2019	Go Google Yourself	5	Brian Hernandez Jr.	Paul J. McGee	Jay Em Ess Stable	1-mile	1:36.43	Listed
2018	Champagne Problems	5	Calvin H. Borel	Ian R. Wilkes	Six Column Stables	1-mile	1:36.74	III
2017	Tiger Moth	5	Corey Lanerie	Brad H. Cox	John D. Gunther	1-mile	1:36.30	III
2016	Innovative Idea	4	Marlon St. Julien	Eoin G. Harty	Godolphin Racing	1-mile	1:36.33	III
2015	Call Pat	6	Joe Rocco Jr.	Brad H. Cox	Miller Racing, LLC	1-mile	1:35.14	III
2014	Molly Morgan	5	Jesús Castañón	Dale Romans	William D. Cubbedge	1-mile	1:36.72	III
2013	Devious Intent	4	Roberto Morales	Kellyn Gorder	TK Stables (Kevin & Tammie Hulse)	1-mile	1:34.97	III
2012	Salty Strike	4	Victor Lebron	Kenneth McPeek	Craig Singer	1-mile	1:36.81	III
2011	Groupie Doll	3	Greta Kuntzweiler	William Bradley	Fred & William Bradley	1-mile	1:37.37	III
2010	Direct Line	4	Tony Farina	Vickie Oliver	St. George Farm Racing	1-mile	1:38.32	III
2009	Whirlie Bertie	4	Larry Melancon	Steve Margolis	Bertram & Elaine Klein	1-mile	1:35.80	III
2008	Swift Temper	4	Victor Lebron	Dale Romans	Mark H. Stanley	1-mile	1:37.55	III
2007	Pleasant Hill	4	Larry Melancon	Greg Foley	Donamire Farm	1-mile	1:38.85	III
2006	Prospective Saint	5	Eddie Castro	Martin D. Wolfson	Charles Miller	1-mile	1:36.13	III
2005	Dream of Summer	6	Corey Nakatani	Juan J. Garcia	James Weigel	1-mile	1:35.32	III
2004	Angela's Love	4	Mark Guidry	Dale Romans	Bill & Vicki Poston	1 1/8	1:49.54	III
2003	Bare Necessities	4	René Douglas	Wallace Dollase	Iron County Farms Inc. (George E. Middleton)	1 1/8	1:50.09	III
2002	Minister's Baby	4	Craig Perret	Ken McPeek	Lucky Seven Stable (Mike Makin)	1 1/8	1:49.73	III
2001	Asher	4	Mark Guidry	Ronald Moquett	Pepper Tree Farms	1 1/8	1:50.16	III
2000	Silent Eskimo	5	James Lopez	Bobby C. Barnett	John A. Franks	1 1/8	1:50.56	III
1999	Lines of Beauty	4	Francisco Torres	Randy Martin	Marco Thoroughbred Corp. (Marco Bommarito)	1 1/8	1:49.60	III
1998	Meter Maid	4	Patrick Johnson	Stanley M. Hough	Robert E. Courtney	1 1/8	1:51.00	
1997	Three Fanfares	4	Fabio Arguello Jr.	Michael Tammaro	Mereworth Farm	1 1/8	1:49.00	
1996	Country Cat	4	Donna Barton	D. Wayne Lukas	Overbrook Farm	1 1/8	1:49.60	
1995	Laura's Pistolette	4	Eddie Martin Jr.	Murray Johnson	Jack Smith	1 1/8	1:50.80	
1994	Alphabulous	5	Otto Thorwarth	Steve Brown	R. Coppola/W. Wright	1 1/8	1:50.00	
1993	Erica's Dream	5	Willie Martinez	Bobby C. Barnett	Lushland Farm	1 1/8	1:49.80	
1992	Bungalow	5	Francisco Torres	Harvey L. Vanier	Nancy A. Vanier	1 1/8	1:48.60	
1991	Summer Matinee	4	Corey Black	D. Wayne Lukas	Clover Racing Stable	1 1/8	1:50.50	
1990	Evangelical	4	Larry Melancon	William I. Mott	Bertram & Diana Firestone	1 1/8	1:49.80	
1989	Lawyer Talk	5	Mary E. Doser	Sam Ramer	M. W. Miller Jr.	1 1/8	1:50.00	
1988	Lt. Lao	4	Donald Brumfield	James Eakins	Robert C. Keller	1 1/8	1:47.60	
1987	No Choice	4	Charles Woods Jr.	Mike Lauer	Webb Farms	1 1/8	1:49.20	
1986	Queen Alexandra	4	Darrell E. Foster	George Baker Jr.	Rosalind Rosenthal	1 1/8	1:49.20	
1985	Crimson Orchid	3	Scott E. Miller	Vickie Foley	Diane Dodge	1 1/8	1:49.80	
1984	Rambling Rhythm	3	Luis J. Martinez	Rick Hiles	William B. Robinson	1 1/8	1:50.20	
1983	Migola	3	Garth Patterson	Ray Lawrence Jr.	Spendthrift Farm	1 1/8	1:51.60	
1982	Sweetest Chant	4	Earlie Fires	Joseph M. Bollero	Russell L. Reineman	1 1/8	1:49.80	

== See also ==
- Groupie Doll Stakes top three finishers
