= Presious Passion =

American-bred Thoroughbred racehorse

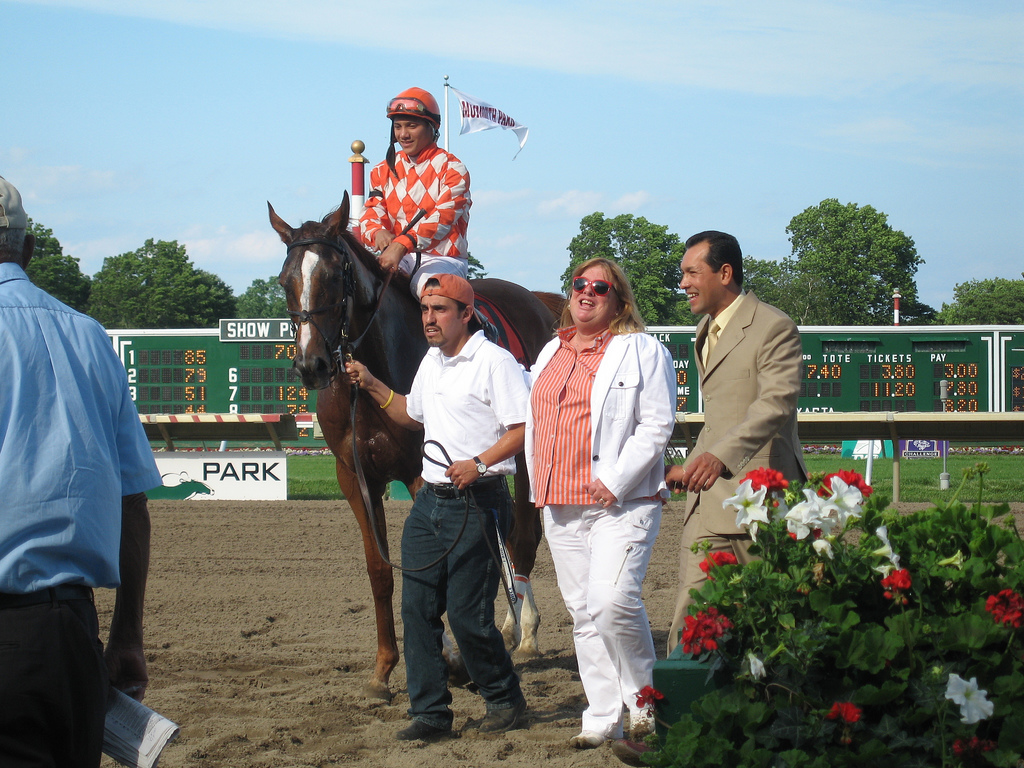
- Mary Hartman and Presious Passion at 2009 United Nations Stakes.
- Sire: Royal Anthem
- Grandsire: Theatrical
- Dam: Princesas Passion
- Damsire: Marquerty
- Sex: Gelding
- Foaled: 2003
- Country: United States
- Colour: Chestnut
- Breeder: Joseph & Helen Barbazon
- Owner: Patricia A. Generazio
- Trainer: Mary Hartmann
- Record: 52: 14-7-2
- Earnings: $ 2,666,293

Major wins
- Jersey Derby (2006); Cliff Hanger Stakes (2007); Pan American Handicap (2008); United Nations Stakes (2008, 2009); W. L. McKnight Handicap (2007, 2008); Monmouth Stakes (2009); Clement L. Hirsch Turf Championship Stakes (2009); Mac Diarmida Handicap (2009, 2010)

Awards
- Florida-bred Horse of the Year (2009)

Presious Passion (foaled March 5, 2003) is a multiple Grade I winning Thoroughbred racehorse.

== Background ==
Bred in the United States, he is a gelded son of multiple Grade I winner Royal Anthem and the unraced mare, Princesa's Passion, who comes from an extended family of stakes winning horses.

== Racing career ==
Presious Passion's career has included wins in the United Nations Stakes (twice) and the Clement L. Hirsch Turf Championship Stakes and a second-place finish in the 2009 Breeders' Cup Turf. Presious Passion was one of three Eclipse Award finalists for older turf horse in 2009, losing to Gio Ponti (horse).

The 2009 Breeders' Cup Turf earned him international respect. He opened up ten lengths and set fractions of 45 flat for the half mile and 1:09 1/5 for three quarters of a mile, unusually fast for a mile and a half race. Defending champion Conduit won the race by half a length. American turf writer Steve Haskin has described this as one of the best losing performances in Breeders' Cup history.

Presious Passion is considered exceptional for this style of running. Longer turf races are often won in a final dash in which closing speed is more important than early speed. Presious Passion, however, has become well known for his speed from the gate. According to trainer Mary Hartmann and regular rider Elvis Trujillo, he refuses to rate and they let him run his own race. He often distances himself from the field by up to 20 lengths, as he did in the 2009 United Nations, and then fights in the stretch, either tiring from his early efforts or prevailing. Because of his unpredictable style, he has developed a strong fan base. Hartmann has said, "He is not a cheap suitcase. He doesn't fold."

Presious Passion competed in the $5 million Dubai Sheema Classic (UAE-I) on March 27 in Dubai, finishing last. Since then, he has failed to return to his 2009 form, losing 3 straight races. Some attributed his 2010 form to the so-called "Dubai Bounce", the name given to the tendency for American thoroughbreds to regress in form due to the stress of traveling to and from the spring Dubai World Cup championship races at Meydan Racecourse. Others have suggested that he was no longer able to carry his speed as well as in previous years.
