= Mona de Momma =

American-bred Thoroughbred racehorse

- Sire: Speightstown
- Grandsire: Gone West
- Dam: Society Gal
- Damsire: Linkage
- Sex: Filly
- Foaled: 2006
- Country: United States
- Colour: Bay
- Breeder: Kim Nardelli, Rodney Nardelli, R.C.Durr & Dr. Michael Spirito
- Owner: Michael Talla
- Trainer: John W. Sadler
- Record: 11: 5-1-2
- Earnings: US$377,619

Major wins
- Las Flores Handicap (2010); Humana Distaff Stakes (2010)

Mona de Momma (foaled March 16, 2006) is an American Thoroughbred racehorse.

She is a Speightstown filly out of the Linkage mare Society Gal, a half sister to Grade 3 winner and sire Mr. Greenly. Owned by Michael Talla and trained by John W. Sadler, in 2010 burst onto the spotlight when she won the Las Flores Handicap, then she defeated 2009 Eclipse Champion Sprint Mare Informed Decision in the Humana Distaff Stakes on the Kentucky Derby undercard.
