= Hurricane Bertie Stakes =

- Class: Grade III
- Location: Gulfstream Park; Hallandale Beach, Florida, United States
- Inaugurated: 2001
- Race type: Thoroughbred - Flat racing
- Website: Gulfstream Park

Race information
- Distance: 6 1/2 furlongs
- Surface: Dirt
- Track: Left-handed
- Qualification: Fillies and mares, four years old and older
- Weight: 124 lbs with allowances
- Purse: $125,000 (2023)

The Hurricane Bertie Stakes is a Grade III American Thoroughbred horse race for fillies and mares that are four years old or older, over a distance of 6 1/2 furlongs on the dirt track held annually in March at Gulfstream Park, Hallandale Beach, Florida. The event currently carries a purse of $125,000.

== History ==
The race was inaugurated in 2001 over a shorter distance of 6 furlongs and named after the winning mare Hurricane Bertie who won 14 races in her career including the Grade II Princess Rooney Stakes. The following year the event's distance was increased to 6 1/2 furlongs.

The event was upgraded to a Grade III event in 2005.

In 2015 the distance the event was increased to 7 furlongs but in 2021 the distance was reverted to 6 1/2 furlongs.

== Records ==
Speed record:

- 7 furlongs – 1:21.45 - Dream Pauline (2019)
- 6 1/2 furlongs – 1:14.68 - Groupie Doll (2014)

Margins:

- 9 1/2 lengths – Merry Meadow (2015)

Most wins by a jockey

- 4 - Javier Castellano (2006, 2008, 2011, 2019)

Most wins by a trainer

- 4 - H. Allen Jerkens (2004, 2005, 2007, 2009)

Most wins by an owner

- 3 - Joseph V. Shields Jr. (2004, 2007, 2009)

== Winners ==
Year	Winner	Age	Jockey	Trainer	Owner	Distance	Time	Purse	Grade	Ref
2026	R Disaster	5	Micah J. Husbands	Saffie A. Joseph Jr.	Averill Racing, Two Eight Racing & ATM Racing	6 1/2 furlongs	1:16.28	$165,000	III	
2025	Nic's Style	5	Junior Alvarado	William I. Mott	Stephen Rousseau	6 1/2 furlongs	1:16.53	$163,000	III	
2024	Red Carpet Ready	4	Luis Saez	George R. Arnold II	Ashbrook Farm & Upland Flats Racing	6 1/2 furlongs	1:16.09	$129,000	III	
2023	Frank's Rockette	6	Junior Alvarado	William I. Mott	Frank Fletcher Racing	6 1/2 furlongs	1:16.81	$125,000	III	
2022	Obligatory	4	Tyler Gaffalione	William I. Mott	Juddmonte Farms	6 1/2 furlongs	1:17.92	$100,000	III	
2021	Pacific Gale	6	Junior Alvarado	John C. Kimmel	Holly Hill Stable	6 1/2 furlongs	1:15.93	$100,000	III	
2020	Sally's Curlin	4	Edgar S. Prado	Dale L. Romans	CJ Thoroughbreds, Left Turn Racing & Casner Racing	7 furlongs	1:22.84	$150,000	III	
2019	Dream Pauline	4	Javier Castellano	Kiaran P. McLaughlin	Stonestreet Stable	7 furlongs	1:21.45	$150,000	III	
2018	Jordan's Henny	4	Tyler Gaffalione	Michael A. Tomlinson	Ervine Woolsey & Ralph Kinder	7 furlongs	1:23.68	$175,000	III	
2017	Curlin's Approval	4	Luis Saez	Martin D. Wolfson	Alter's Racing Stable	7 furlongs	1:23.23	$100,000	III	
2016	Race not held									
2015	Merry Meadow	5	Javier Castellano	Mark A. Hennig	William Parson Jr. & David S. Howe	6 1/2 furlongs	1:17.97	$150,000	III	
2014	Groupie Doll	6	Rajiv Maragh	William B. Bradley	Whisper Hill Farm	6 1/2 furlongs	1:14.68	$200,000	III	
2013	Golden Mystery	7	Luis Saez	Martin D. Wolfson	Farnsworth Stable	6 1/2 furlongs	1:15.96	$150,000	III	
2012	R Holiday Mood	4	John R. Velazquez	Todd A. Pletcher	E. Paul Robsham Stable	6 1/2 furlongs	1:15.85	$150,000	III	
2011	Hilda's Passion	4	Javier Castellano	Todd A. Pletcher	Starlight Racing	6 1/2 furlongs	1:15.79	$150,000	III	
2010	Kays and Jays	4	Jose Lezcano	Mike R. Mitchell	Zayat Stables	6 1/2 furlongs	1:16.30	$125,000	III	
2009	Any Limit	6	Cornelio H. Velasquez	H. Allen Jerkens	Joseph V. Shields Jr.	6 1/2 furlongs	1:15.95	$122,500	III	
2008	Sugar Swirl	5	Javier Castellano	Brian A. Lynch	Stronach Stables	7 furlongs	1:22.77	$101,500	III	
2007	Any Limit	4	Rafael Bejarano	H. Allen Jerkens	Joseph V. Shields Jr.	6 1/2 furlongs	1:17.16	$108,500	III	
2006	Smokey Glacken	5	Javier Castellano	James A. Jerkens	Susan & John Moore	6 1/2 furlongs	1:15.47	$100,000	III	
2005	Lilah	8	Rajiv Maragh	H. Allen Jerkens	Hobeau Farm	6 1/2 furlongs	1:15.45	$100,000	III	
2004	House Party	4	José A. Santos	H. Allen Jerkens	Joseph V. Shields Jr.	6 1/2 furlongs	1:15.55	$100,000	Listed	
2003	Gold Mover	5	Edgar S. Prado	Mark A. Hennig	Edward P. Evans	6 1/2 furlongs	1:15.83	$100,000	Listed	
2002	Gold Mover	4	Eibar Coa	Mark A. Hennig	Edward P. Evans	6 1/2 furlongs	1:15.38	$100,000	Listed	
2001	Swept Away	4	Edgar S. Prado	Bernard S. Flint	Klein, Richard, Bertram & Elaine	6 furlongs	1:09.85	$83,700	Listed	
