= Cliff Hanger Stakes =

Horse race in New Jersey, US

- Class: Grade III
- Location: Monmouth Park Racetrack; Oceanport, New Jersey, United States
- Inaugurated: 1977
- Race type: Thoroughbred – Flat racing
- Website: Monmouth Park

Race information
- Distance: 1 1/16 miles (8.5 furlongs)
- Surface: Turf
- Track: Left-handed
- Qualification: Three-year-olds & up
- Weight: Assigned
- Purse: $102,000 (2023)

The Cliff Hanger Stakes is an American Thoroughbred horse race run annually at Monmouth Park in Oceanport, New Jersey, in May. Open to horses age three and older, it is now contested on turf over a distance of 1 1/16 miles. As of 2023, the purse is $102,000.

Known as the Cliff Hanger Handicap until 2008, it was raced on dirt from 1978 through 1981 and again in 1985 and 1987. Prior to 1982, it was restricted to horses bred in the State of New Jersey.

== Records ==
Speed record:

- 8.5 Furlongs – 1:39 2/5 – Wanderkin (1988), Dixie Bayou (1997)
- 9 Furlongs – 1:46.16 – Winning Cause (2014)

Most wins:

- 2 – Erin's Tiger (1982, 1983)
- 2 – Late Act (1984, 1985)’

Most wins by an owner:

- 2 – Greentree Stable (1984, 1985)
- 2 – Live Oak Racing (1994, 2006)

Most wins by a jockey:

- 3 – Jorge Velásquez (1980, 1982, 1983)

Most wins by a trainer:

- 3 – Christophe Clement (2013, 2015, 2023)
- 2 – Joseph H. Pierce Jr. (1980, 1987)
- 2 – Richard Nieminski (1982, 1983)
- 2 – Jonathan Sheppard (1987, 1989)
- 2 – H. Graham Motion (2016, 2024)

== Winners since 1999 ==
Year	Winner	Age	Jockey	Trainer	Owner	Time
2025	Otago	5	Axel Concepcion	Kelsey Danner	Crown's Way Racing LLC, NBS Stable, Delava, Edward and Diamant, Eli	1:42.54
2024	Dataman	4	Jorge Ruiz	H. Graham Motion	Wertheimer and Frere	1:41.42
2023	Big Everest	5	Jorge A. Vargas Jr.	Christophe Clement	Reeves Thoroughbred Racing, Steven Rocco and William Branch	1:40.42
2022	Kentucky Ghost	5	Jorge A. Vargas Jr.	Victoria H. Oliver	BBN Racing	1:40.44
2021	no race					
2020	no race					
2019	Hawkish	5	Trevor McCarthy	James J. Toner	AJ Suited Racing Stable, Madaket Stables LLC	1:35.11
2018	Force the Pass	6	Jevian Toledo	Alan E. Goldberg	Colts Neck Stables	1:35.11
2017	no race					
2016	Can'thelpbelieving (IRE)	5	Trevor McCarthy	H. Graham Motion	Albert Frassetto	1:46.77
2015	Middleburg	5	Joe Bravo	Christophe Clement	Mr. & Mrs. Bertram R. Firestone	1:48.52
2014	Winning Cause	4	Eddie Castro	Todd Pletcher	Alto Racing LLC	1:46.16
2013	Summer Front	4	Joe Bravo	Christophe Clement	Waterford Stable	1:41.49
2012	Tune Me In	5	Paco Lopez	Bruce F. Alexander	Patricia A. Generazio	1:33.96
2011	Yummy with Butter	8	Paco Lopez	Yvon Belsoeur	Bruno Schickedanz	1:32.75
2010	no race					
2009	Brave Tin Soldier	5	Carlos Marquez Jr.	Kiaran McLaughlin	Kiaran McLaughlin	1:45.52
2008	Kiss the Kid	5	Rajiv Maragh	Amy Tarrant	Hardacre Farm/Amy Tarrant	1:43.60
2007	Presious Passion	4	Alan Garcia	Mary Hartmann	Patricia A. Generazio	1:41.48
2006	Old Forester	5	Edgar Prado	William I. Mott	Live Oak Racing	1:42.54
2005	Hotstufanthensome	5	Rajiv Maragh	Norman Pointer	Leslie Steinger	1:54.32
2004	Dr. Kashnikow	7	Richard Migliore	John R. S. Fisher	Erdenheim Farm	1:42.41
2003	no race					
2002	Saint Verre	4	Jean-Luc Samyn	H. Allen Jerkens	H. Joseph Allen	1:42.40
2001	Crash Course	5	Rick Wilson	Warren W. Croll Jr.	Jesse Mack Robinson	1:43.14
2000	North East Bound	4	José Vélez Jr.	William W. Perry	J. Demarco/R. Disano	1:41.78
1999	Virginia Carnival	7	Jean-Luc Samyn	Jonathan Sheppard	John A. Franks	1:42.44

== Earlier winners ==
- 1998 – Mi Narrow
- 1997 – Dixie Bayou
- 1996 – Thorny Crown
- 1995 – Mighty Forum
- 1994 – Binary Light
- 1993 – Excellent Tipper
- 1992 – Roman Envoy
- 1991 – Finder's Choice
- 1990 – Chas' Whim
- 1989 – Ten Keys
- 1988 – Wanderkin
- 1987 – Silver Comet
- 1987 – Foligno
- 1986 – Explosive Darling
- 1985 – Late Act
- 1984 – Late Act
- 1984 – Cozzene
- 1983 – Erin's Tiger
- 1982 – Erin's Tiger
- 1982 – Acaroid
- 1981 – Bill Wheeler
- 1980 – Quality T. V.
- 1979 – Exclusively Mine
- 1978 – Mr. Lincroft
- 1977 – Dan Horn
