= Mac Diarmida Stakes =

- Class: Grade II
- Location: Gulfstream Park; Hallandale Beach, Florida, United States
- Inaugurated: 1995
- Race type: Thoroughbred - Flat racing
- Sponsor: FanDuel TV (since 2025)
- Website: www.gulfstreampark.com

Race information
- Distance: 1 3/8 miles (11 furlongs)
- Surface: Turf
- Track: Left-handed
- Qualification: Four-year-olds and older
- Weight: 124 lbs with allowances
- Purse: $200,000 (since 2014)

The Mac Diarmida Stakes is a Grade II American Thoroughbred horse race for horses four-years-old and older run over a distance of one-and-three-eighth miles (11 furlongs) on the turf, annually in late February or early March at Gulfstream Park in Hallandale Beach, Florida. The current purse is $200,000.

== History ==
The event was inaugurated on 16 January 1995 for three-year-olds at a distance of 1 mile and 70 yards and was held on the dirt track.

The race was named in honor of Florida-bred Mac Diarmida who was the American Champion Male Turf Horse of 1978. The following year, in 1996 the event was lengthened slightly to one-and-one-sixteenth miles and run on the turf.

It was run as a handicap from 1997 through 2008 but is now run under allowance weight conditions. The event was upgraded to Grade III in 1997. In 1997, wet weather forced the race to be moved from the turf course to the main dirt track and set at a distance of one-and-one-quarter miles with conditions changed to allow horses four years old and older. In 1998 the race was changed to its present distance of one-and-three-eighths miles.

The race was not run in 2001. The event was upgraded once again in 2007 to Grade II. The event was originally held in January but since 2017 has been run in late February or early March.

== Records ==
Speed record

- 1 3/8 miles — 2:10.87 Stream of Gold (IRE) (2008)

Margins

- 4 1/4 lengths — Panama City (1999)

Most wins

- 2 - Presious Passion (2009, 2010)
- 2 - Zulu Alpha – (2019, 2020)

Most wins by an owner

- 3 - Michael M. Hui (2019, 2020, 2023)

Most wins by a jockey

- 4 - Jerry Bailey (1997, 1998, 1999, 2002)
- 4 - John R. Velazquez (2007, 2011, 2013, 2025)

Most wins by a trainer

- 5 - Michael J. Maker (2019, 2020, 2022, 2023, 2024)

== Winners ==
| Year | Winner | Age | Jockey | Trainer | Owner | Distance | Time | Purse | Grade | Ref |
|---|---|---|---|---|---|---|---|---|---|---|
Mac Diarmida Stakes
| 2026 | Grand Sonata | 7 | Tyler Gaffalione | Todd A. Pletcher | Whisper Hill Farm LLC | 1 3/8 miles | 2:11.26 | $205,000 | II | |
| 2025 | Capture the Flag | 5 | John R. Velazquez | Todd A. Pletcher | Joseph Allen, Derrick Smith, Mrs. John Magnier, Michael Tabor, Westerburg & Jonathan Poulin | 1 3/8 miles | 2:12.90 | $200,000 | II | |
| 2024 | Starting Over | 7 | Edgard Zayas | Michael J. Maker | Nice Guys Stables | 1 3/8 miles | 2:12.29 | $200,000 | II | |
| 2023 | Value Engineering | 7 | Jose L. Ortiz | Michael J. Maker | Michael M. Hui & Phil Forte | 1 3/8 miles | 2:14.20 | $200,000 | II | |
| 2022 | Temple | 6 | Jose L. Ortiz | Michael J. Maker | Paradise Farms & David Staudacher | abt. 1 3/8 miles | 2:15.30 | $200,000 | II | |
| 2021 | Phantom Currency | 5 | Paco Lopez | Bryan Lynch | Jim & Susan Hill | 1 3/8 miles | 2:13.84 | $200,000 | II | |
| 2020 | Zulu Alpha | 7 | Tyler Gaffalione | Michael J. Maker | Michael M. Hui | 1 3/8 miles | 2:11.47 | $200,000 | II | |
| 2019 | Zulu Alpha | 6 | Irad Ortiz Jr. | Michael J. Maker | Michael M. Hui | 1 3/8 miles | 2:16.39 | $200,000 | II | |
| 2018 | Sadler's Joy | 5 | Julien R. Leparoux | Thomas Albertrani | Woodslane Farm | 1 3/8 miles | 2:12.93 | $200,000 | II | |
| 2017 | Wake Forest (GER) | 7 | Javier Castellano | Chad C. Brown | Michael Dubb, Sheep Pond Partners, Bethlehem Stables | 1 3/8 miles | 2:13.54 | $200,000 | II | |
| 2016 | Grand Tito | 6 | Emisael Jaramillo | Gustavo Delgado | Grupo 7C Racing Stable | 1 3/8 miles | 2:12.55 | $200,000 | II | |
| 2015 | Main Sequence | 6 | Rajiv Maragh | H. Graham Motion | Flaxman Holdings | 1 3/8 miles | 2:15.06 | $200,000 | II | |
| 2014 | Twilight Eclipse | 5 | Jose Lezcano | Thomas Albertrani | West Point Thoroughbreds | 1 3/8 miles | 2:15.18 | $200,000 | II | |
| 2013 | Amira's Prince (IRE) | 4 | John R. Velazquez | William I. Mott | Wachtel Stable, Eclipse Thoroughbred & Gary Barber | 1 3/8 miles | 2:17.14 | $150,000 | II | |
| 2012 | Simmard | 7 | Javier Castellano | Roger L. Attfield | Roger L. Attfield & William Werner | 1 3/8 miles | 2:11.71 | $150,000 | II | |
| 2011 | Prince Will I Am | 4 | John R. Velazquez | Michelle Nihei | Casa Farms I | 1 3/8 miles | 2:13.04 | $150,000 | II | |
| 2010 | Presious Passion | 7 | Elvis Trujillo | Mary Hartmann | Patricia A. Generazio | 1 3/8 miles | 2:13.49 | $150,000 | II | |
| 2009 | Presious Passion | 6 | Elvis Trujillo | Mary Hartmann | Patricia A. Generazio | 1 3/8 miles | 2:12.10 | $150,000 | II | |
Mac Diarmida Handicap
| 2008 | Stream of Gold (IRE) | 7 | Eddie Castro | Kiaran P. McLaughlin | Zabeel Racing | 1 3/8 miles | 2:10.87 | $150,000 | II | |
| 2007 | Ramazutti | 5 | John R. Velazquez | Anthony J. Sciametta Jr. | Anstu Stable | 1 3/8 miles | 2:11.86 | $150,000 | II | |
| 2006 | Hotstufanthensome | 6 | Rajiv Maragh | Nathan W. Sinclair | Running Horse Farm | 1 3/8 miles | 2:10.90 | $100,000 | III | |
| 2005 | Host | 5 | Javier Castellano | John C. Kimmel | Caesar P. Kimmel, Philip J. Solondz & C G Zoe Stable | 1 3/8 miles | 2:12.83 | $100,000 | III | |
| 2004 | Request for Parole | 5 | Jose A. Santos | Stanley M. Hough | Jeri & Sam Knighton | 1 3/8 miles | 2:12.58 | $100,000 | III | |
| 2003 | Riddlesdown (IRE) | 6 | Roger I. Velez | Niall M. O'Callaghan | Gary A. Tanaka | 1 3/8 miles | 2:14.75 | $100,000 | III | |
| 2002 | Crash Course | 6 | Jerry D. Bailey | Jimmy Croll | J. Mack Robinson | 1 3/8 miles | 2:16.27 | $100,000 | III | |
| 2001 | Race not held | | | | | | | | | |
| 2000 | Unite's Big Red | 6 | Jorge F. Chavez | Randy Mills | Breakaway Racing Stable | 1 3/8 miles | 2:12.14 | $100,000 | III | |
| 1999 | Panama City | 5 | Jerry D. Bailey | William I. Mott | Robert Sangster & Joseph LaCombe | abt. 1 3/8 miles | 2:20.65 | $100,000 | III | |
| 1998 | Copy Editor | 6 | Jerry D. Bailey | Martin D. Wolfson | Team Valor | 1 3/8 miles | 2:16.72 | $100,000 | III | |
| 1997 | Mecke | 5 | Jerry D. Bailey | Emanuel Tortora | James Lewis Jr. | 1 1/4 miles | 2:05.80 | $72,750 | III | |
Mac Diarmida Stakes
| 1996 | A Real Zipper | 3 | Aaron Gryder | Ronald B. Spatz | Horses of Course | 1 1/16 miles | 1:42.66 | $50,000 | Listed | For 3YO Only |
| 1995 | Kings Fiction | 3 | Robbie Davis | H. Allen Jerkens | Hardwick Stables | 1 mile & 70 yards | 1:43.12 | $50,000 | Listed | For 3YO Only |

Legend:
Turf Dirt

== See also ==
List of American and Canadian Graded races
