= Irish Jasper =

American-bred Thoroughbred racehorse

- Sire: First Defence
- Grandsire: Unbridled's Song
- Dam: Irish Connection
- Damsire: Mr Greeley
- Sex: Mare
- Foaled: 12 April 2012
- Country: United States
- Colour: Bay or brown
- Breeder: Mr. & Mrs. Robert E. Courtney Sr.
- Owner: William Stamps Farish III, David F. Mackie
- Trainer: Derek S. Ryan; Chad C. Brown (2016)
- Record: 16: 8-0-1
- Earnings: $560,300

Major wins
- Belle Harbor Stakes (2015); Gasparilla Stakes (2015); Miss Preakness Stakes (2015); Victory Ride Stakes (2015); Thoroughbred Club of America Stakes (2016)

Irish Jasper is an American thoroughbred racehorse who has eight wins, including multiple graded stakes races.

== 2015 season ==
She won the Grade III Victory Ride Stakes. This was Irish Jasper's third consecutive win, prompting her owner to enter her in the Grade I Test Stakes. The Test Stakes was her first Grade 1 race, and she finished fourth.

Irish Jasper also won the Grade III Miss Preakness Stakes.

== 2016 season ==
She won the Grade II Thoroughbred Club of America Stakes, earning a start in the Grade I 2016 Breeders' Cup Filly & Mare Sprint in which she would finish out of the money.
