= Raven Run Stakes =

- Class: Grade II
- Location: Keeneland Race Course; Lexington Kentucky, United States
- Inaugurated: 1999
- Race type: Thoroughbred - Flat racing
- Sponsor: Lexus of Lexington (since 2005)
- Website: Keeneland

Race information
- Distance: 7 furlongs
- Surface: Dirt
- Track: left-handed
- Qualification: Three-year-old fillies
- Weight: 123 lbs. with allowances
- Purse: $350,000 (since 2022)

The Raven Run Stakes is a Grade II American thoroughbred horse race for three-year-old fillies over a distance of seven furlongs on the dirt held annually in October at Keeneland Race Course in Lexington, Kentucky during the fall meeting.

== History ==
This race is named for the 374-acre (1.51 km^{2}) nature sanctuary outside Lexington, Kentucky.

The event was inaugurated on 13 October 1999 and was won Dreamy Maiden who was ridden by US Hall of Fame jockey Pat Day to a neck victory after losing the lead in the straight in a time of 1:22.64.

From 1999 to 2001 the event was classified as Listed and in 2002 the event was upgraded to Grade III. In 2004 the event was upgraded to Grade II.

In 2008, Informed Decision set a new track record of 1:20.86 on the polytrack surface. The following year she captured the Breeders' Cup Filly & Mare Sprint and was voted US Champion Female Sprint Horse.

== Records ==
Speed record

- Dirt: 1:20.88 – Darling My Darling (2000)
- Polytrack: 1:20.86 – Informed Decision (2008)

Margins

- 9 lengths – Taris (2014)

Most wins by a jockey

- 4 – John R. Velazquez (2008, 2012, 2023, 2025)

Most wins by a trainer

- 2 – John T. Ward, Jr. (2000, 2005)
- 2 – Robert J. Frankel (2002, 2007)

Most wins by an owner

- 2 – John C. Oxley (2000, 2005)
- 2 – Juddmonte Farms (2002, 2007)

== Winners ==
Year	Winner	Jockey	Trainer	Owner	Distance	Time	Purse	Grade	Ref
2026	Movie Night	Flavien Prat	William Walden	WinStar Farm	7 furlongs	1:23.28	$381,500	II	
2025	Kappa Kappa	John R. Velazquez	Robert E. Reid Jr.	LC Racing, Cash is King & Wellesley Stable	7 furlongs	1:23.90	$334,688	II	
2024	Emery	Tyler Gaffalione	Brad H. Cox	Stonestreet Stables	7 furlongs	1:23.21	$340,000	II	
2023	Vahva	John R. Velazquez	Cherie DeVaux	Belladonna Racing, Edward J. Hudson, Jr., West Point Thoroughbreds, LBD Stable, Nice Guys Stables, Manganaro Bloodstock, Runnels Racing, Steve Hornstock & Twin Brook Stables	7 furlongs	1:23.28	$349,375	II	
2022	Wicked Halo	Tyler Gaffalione	Steven M. Asmussen	Winchell Thoroughbreds	7 furlongs	1:24.30	$334,500	II	
2021	Caramel Swirl	Junior Alvarado	William I. Mott	Godolphin Racing	7 furlongs	1:23.42	$250,000	II	
2020	Venetian Harbor	Manuel Franco	Richard Baltas	Ciaglia Racing, Highland Yard, River Oak Farm & Domenic Savides	7 furlongs	1:23.03	$200,000	II	
2019	Bell's the One	Corey J. Lanerie	Neil L. Pessin	Lothenbach Stables	7 furlongs	1:22.97	$250,000	II	
2018	Shamrock Rose	Tyler Gaffalione	Mark E. Casse	Conrad Farms	7 furlongs	1:22.98	$250,000	II	
2017	Miss Sunset	Julien R. Leparoux	Jeffrey L. Bonde	Phillip Lebherz & Alan Phillip Klein	7 furlongs	1:22.21	$250,000	II	
2016	Lightstream	Julien R. Leparoux	Brian A. Lynch	Up Hill Stable & Head of Plains Partners	7 furlongs	1:22.68	$250,000	II	
2015	Sarah Sis	Florent Geroux	Ingrid Mason	Joe Ragsdale	7 furlongs	1:22.96	$250,000	II	
2014	Taris	Clinton L. Potts	Todd M. Beattie	Commonwealth New Era Racing	7 furlongs	1:21.32	$250,000	II	
2013	Madame Cactus	Joseph Rocco Jr.	Peter Eurton	Mr. & Mrs. Marc C. Ferrell	7 furlongs	1:21.71	$250,000	II	
2012	Gypsy Robin	John R. Velazquez	Wesley A. Ward	King 9 Stables, Bell, Gatewood, Bret Jones & Wesley A. Ward	7 furlongs	1:21.79	$250,000	II	
2011	Great Hot (BRZ)	Chantal Sutherland	A. C. Avila	Coudelaria Jessica	7 furlongs	1:21.70	$250,000	II	
2010	Hilda's Passion	Corey J. Lanerie	Todd A. Pletcher	Starlight Racing	7 furlongs	1:21.38	$250,000	II	
2009	Satans Quick Chick	Leandro D. Goncalves	Eric R. Reed	Jerry Jamgotchian	7 furlongs	1:22.62	$300,000	II	
2008	Informed Decision	John R. Velazquez	Jonathan E. Sheppard	Augustin Stable	7 furlongs	1:20.86	$300,000	II	
2007	Jibboom	Robby Albarado	Robert J. Frankel	Juddmonte Farms	7 furlongs	1:22.01	$300,000	II	
2006	Leah's Secret	Mark Guidry	Helen Pitts-Blasi	First Klass Stable	7 furlongs	1:22.74	$300,000	II	
2005	For All We Know	Shaun Bridgmohan	John T. Ward Jr.	John C. Oxley	7 furlongs	1:23.74	$300,000	II	
2004	Josh's Madelyn	Justin Shepherd	J. Larry Jones	Michael Pressley & Jim Neidig	7 furlongs	1:22.86	$224,200	II	
2003	Yell	Pat Day	Claude R. McGaughey III	Claiborne Farm & Adele B. Dilschneider	7 furlongs	1:21.75	$174,450	III	
2002	Sightseek	Jerry D. Bailey	Robert J. Frankel	Juddmonte Farms	7 furlongs	1:23.98	$171,900	III	
2001	Nasty Storm	Pat Day	Dallas Stewart	Denny Crum, Daryl Elser, Riley McDonald, Joseph Riccelli & Dallas Stewart	7 furlongs	1:23.30	$109,900	Listed	
2000	Darling My Darling	Mike E. Smith	John T. Ward Jr.	John C. Oxley	7 furlongs	1:20.88	$82,425	Listed	
1999	Dreamy Maiden	Pat Day	W. Elliott Walden	Four Fifths Stable	7 furlongs	1:22.64	$62,725	Listed	

Legend:
All Weather Track Dirt

== See also ==
- List of American and Canadian Graded races
