= Swift Temper =

American-bred Thoroughbred racehorse

- Sire: Giant's Causeway
- Grandsire: Storm Cat
- Dam: Glasgow's Gold
- Damsire: Seeking The Gold
- Sex: Colt
- Foaled: 2004
- Country: United States
- Colour: Chestnut
- Breeder: Richard Nip
- Owner: Mark H. Stanley
- Trainer: Dale L. Romans
- Record: 30: 6-4-3 (to date)
- Earnings: $1,033,346(to date)

Major wins
- Gardenia Handicap (2008); Delaware Handicap (2009); Ruffian Handicap (2009)

Swift Temper (foaled 2004 in Kentucky) is an American Thoroughbred racehorse. Bred by Richard Nip, she was out of the winning mare Glasgow's Gold, a daughter of Seeking the Gold. A son of Mr Prospector, she was sired by Giant's Causeway, the 2000 European Horse of the Year and son of Storm Cat.

Swift Temper is owned by Mark H. Stanley and trained by Dale Romans. The Chestnut mare made a surge on the racing environment when she won the Delaware Handicap over Icon Project. After coming off of a well beaten second in the grade one Personal Ensign Stakes, just 13 days after she won the Ruffian Handicap. Made 3:5 betting favorite in the Spinster Stakes at keenland, she was beaten by longshot Muska.
