= Victory Ride Stakes =

- Class: Grade III
- Location: Saratoga Race Course; Saratoga Springs, New York
- Inaugurated: 2003
- Race type: Thoroughbred – Flat racing
- Website: NYRA

Race information
- Distance: 6 1/2 furlongs
- Surface: Dirt
- Track: Left-handed
- Qualification: Three-year-old fillies
- Weight: 124lbs with allowances
- Purse: US$225,000 (2026)

The Victory Ride Stakes is a Grade III American Thoroughbred horse race for three-year-old fillies run at a distance of 6 1/2 furlongs on the dirt held annually in late June or early July at Belmont Park in Elmont, New York.

== History ==
The race is named in honor of Victory Ride, winner of the Grade I Test Stakes in 2001.

The event was inaugurated on 23 August 2003 and was held at Saratoga Race Course in Saratoga Springs, New York over a distance of six furlongs. The event was won by the D. Wayne Lukas trained Country Romance in a time of 1:09.62.

The race was ungraded for its first three editions and was upgraded to Grade III in 2006.

Since 2012, the event has been run at Belmont Park in early July. The race was run at 6 furlongs until 2013, when it was increased to 6 1/2 furlongs.

In 2024 the event was moved to Aqueduct Racetrack due to infield tunnel and redevelopment work at Belmont Park.

In 2025 the event was moved to Saratoga Racetrack as part of the July 4th weekend meeting.

== Records ==
Speed record:

- 6 1/2 furlongs: 1:14.47 – Frank's Rockette (2020)
- 6 furlongs: 1:08.89 – Emma's Encore (2012)

Margins:

- 9 1/4 lengths – La Traviata (2007)

Most wins by a jockey:

- 3 – Joel Rosario (2013, 2014, 2023)

Most wins by a trainer:

- No trainer has won this race more than once.

Most wins by an owner:

- No owner has won this race more than once.

== Winners ==
Year	Winner	Jockey	Trainer	Owner	Distance	Time	Purse	Grade	Ref
At Saratoga
2026	Sippin Pretty	Ricardo Santana Jr.	Ian R. Wilkes	Randall L. Bloch, Six Column Stables, Mike Davis & Gene E. Rice	6 1/2 furlongs	1:17.59	$225,000	III	
2025	Echo Sound	Luis Saez	George R. Arnold II	Gabriel Duignan	6 1/2 furlongs	1:15.49	$162,750	III	
At Aqueduct
2024	Emery	Tyler Gaffalione	Brad H. Cox	Stonestreet Stables	6 1/2 furlongs	1:15.44	$162,750	III	
At Belmont Park
2023	Maple Leaf Mel	Joel Rosario	Melanie Giddings	August Dawn Farm	6 1/2 furlongs	1:15.74	$175,000	III	
2022	Hot Peppers	Luis Saez	Rudy R. Rodriguez	Michael Dubb & Michael J. Caruso	6 1/2 furlongs	1:17.73	$145,500	III	
2021	Souper Sensational	Flavien Prat	Mark E. Casse	Live Oak Plantation	6 1/2 furlongs	1:15.79	$150,000	III	
2020	Frank's Rockette	John Velazquez	William I. Mott	Frank Fletcher Racing Operations	6 1/2 furlongs	1:14.47	$97,000	III	
2019	Royal Charlotte	Javier Castellano	Chad C. Brown	First Row Partner	6 1/2 furlongs	1:15.82	$139,500	III	
2018	Dixie Serenade	Mychel J. Sanchez	Edward J. Coletti Jr.	Uptowncharlybrown Stud	6 1/2 furlongs	1:16.57	$150,000	III	
2017	American Gal	Flavien Prat	Simon Callaghan	Kaleem Shah	6 1/2 furlongs	1:17.38	$144,000	III	
2016	Coppa	Joseph Talamo	Philip D'Amato	Anthony Fanticola & Joseph Scardino	6 1/2 furlongs	1:16.23	$150,000	III	
2015	Irish Jasper	Javier Castellano	Derek S. Ryan	Derek S. Ryan	6 1/2 furlongs	1:16.70	$147,000	III	
2014	Street Story	Joel Rosario	Steven M. Asmussen	Whispering Oaks Farm	6 1/2 furlongs	1:17.08	$150,000	III	
2013	Baby J	Joel Rosario	Patrick L. Reynolds	Paul P. Pompa	6 furlongs	1:10.84	$147,000	III	
2012	Emma's Encore	Junior Alvarado	H. Allen Jerkens	Brenda Mercer & Peter A. Berglar	6 furlongs	1:08.89	$150,000	III	
At Saratoga
2011	Hot Summer	Cornelio Velásquez	David Fawkes	Harold L. Queen	6 furlongs	1:10.18	$102,000	III	
2010	Rapport	Martin Garcia	Bob Baffert	Thoroughbred Legends Racing Stable	6 furlongs	1:09.66	$100,000	III	
2009	Sara Louise	Edgar S. Prado	Saeed bin Suroor	Godolphin Racing	6 furlongs	1:09.66	$110,000	III	
2008	Porte Bonheur	Ramon A. Dominguez	David P. Duggan	Johanna Murphy-Leopoldsberger	6 furlongs	1:09.51	$110,100	III	
2007	La Traviata	Julien R. Leparoux	Patrick L. Biancone	Michael B. Tabor, Mrs. John Magnier & Derrick Smith	6 furlongs	1:09.78	$114,700	III	
2006	Wildcat Bettie B	Mario G. Pino	J. Larry Jones	Oasis Racing	6 furlongs	1:10.81	$110,700	III	
2005	Nothing But Fun	Richard Migliore	Michael E. Hushion	Barry K. Schwartz	6 furlongs	1:09.40	$81,500	Listed	
2004	Smokey Glacken	Joe Bravo	James A. Jerkens	Susan and John Moore	6 furlongs	1:09.64	$76,800	Listed	
2003	Country Romance	Jorge F. Chavez	D. Wayne Lukas	Overbrook Farm	6 furlongs	1:09.62	$76,200	Listed	

== See also ==
- List of American and Canadian Graded races
