= Informed Decision =

American Thoroughbred racehorse

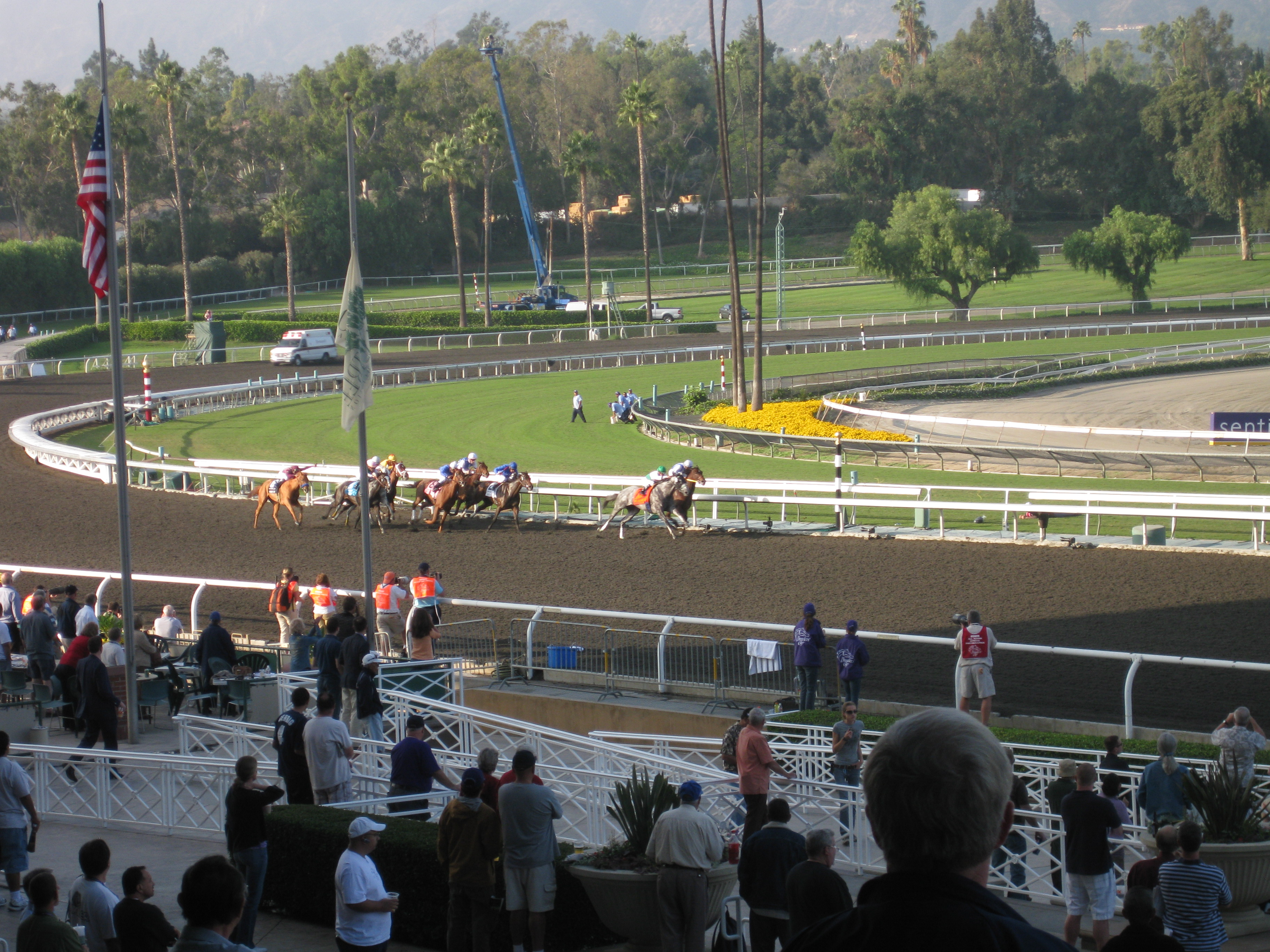
- Informed Decision strikes the lead in the 2009 Filly & Mare Sprint
- Sire: Monarchos
- Grandsire: Maria's Mon
- Dam: Palangana
- Damsire: His Majesty
- Sex: Mare
- Foaled: 2005
- Country: United States
- Colour: Gray
- Breeder: Charles Kidder, Ben Kidder, Nancy Cole
- Owner: Augustin Stable
- Trainer: Jonathan E. Sheppard
- Record: 22: 14-0-5
- Earnings: US$2,214,426

Major wins
- Missile Belle Stakes (2008); Raven Run Stakes (2008); Vinery Madison Stakes (2009); Humana Distaff Handicap (2009); Chicago Handicap (2009, 2010); Presque Isle Downs Masters Stakes (2009, 2010); Thoroughbred Club of America Stakes (2009); Windward Stakes (2010) Breeders' Cup wins: Breeders' Cup Filly & Mare Sprint (2009)

Awards
- American Champion Female Sprint Horse (2009)
- Last updated on January 19, 2010

Informed Decision (foaled February 5, 2005 in Kentucky) is an American Thoroughbred racehorse who won the 2009 Breeders' Cup Filly & Mare Sprint on her way to being named the American Champion Female Sprint Horse.

== Background ==
Informed Decision is a gray mare who was bred by Charles Kidder and Nancy Cole in Kentucky. She is sired by Kentucky Derby winner Monarchos, becoming his first Grade I winner. Her dam is Palangana, by His Majesty. She was sold at the 2006 Keeneland yearling sale for $150,000, then was resold at the Fasig-Tipton sale as a two-year-old for $320,000. She was trained by Jonathan E. Sheppard and owned by George W. Strawbridge, Jr.'s Augustin Stable.

== Racing career ==
Informed Decision did not start racing until age three, but won in her first start on January 3, 2008, at Gulfstream Park. She finished the year with five wins from seven starts, including setting a new track record of 1:20.86 for the seven furlong distance on the polytrack surface at Keeneland in the Grade II Raven Run Stakes.

At age four, she won six of seven starts, including the Grade I Humana Distaff Handicap and Vinery Madison Stakes. Her only loss of the year came in the Ballerina Stakes on a sloppy track. On November 6, 2009, she entered the Breeders' Cup Filly & Mare Sprint, where she was the second betting choice behind defending champion Ventura. Informed Decision got the early jump on her rival, then withstood Ventura's late charge to win by over a length. For her performances in 2009, Informed Decision was voted the Eclipse Award as the American Champion Female Sprint Horse.

Informed Decision returned to racing at age five in 2010 but managed only three wins from eight starts. The highlights were wins in the Grade III Chicago Handicap and Presque Isle Downs Masters Stakes. She finished seventh when attempting to defend her title in the Filly & Mare Sprint.

== Retirement ==
Informed Decision became a broodmare in 2011, delivering her first foal, a bay colt by Street Cry, on March 11, 2012.
