= Rajiv Maragh =

Jamaica-born American jockey

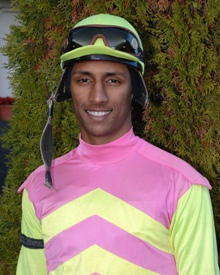

Personal information
- Born: July 9, 1985 (age 41) Spanish Town, Jamaica
- Occupation: Jockey

Horse racing career
- Sport: Horse racing
- Career wins: 1,673

Major racing wins
- Cliff Hanger Stakes (2005, 2008); Mac Diarmida Handicap (2006); Violet Handicap (2007); Ashland Stakes (2008); Bed O' Roses Handicap (2008); Bourbon Stakes (2008); Distaff Handicap (2008); Alcibiades Stakes (2009); Apple Blossom Handicap (2009); Ballerina Stakes (2009); Beldame Stakes (2009); First Lady Stakes (2009); Florida Oaks (2009); Go For Wand Handicap (2009); Just A Game Handicap (2009); Saratoga Dew Stakes (2009); Knickerbocker Handicap (2009); Yaddo Handicap (2009); Louisiana Derby (2010); Hill Prince Stakes (2010); King's Bishop Stakes(2011); Kent Stakes (2013); Classics & Breeders' Cup; Breeders' Cup Dirt Mile (2011); Breeders' Cup Juvenile Sprint (2012); Breeders' Cup Filly & Mare Sprint (2012); Breeders' Cup Filly & Mare Sprint (2013)

Significant horses
- Music Note, Diamondrella, Caleb's Posse, Wicked Strong, Mucho Macho Man, Main Sequence, Groupie Doll

Rajiv Maragh (born July 9, 1985) is a Jamaican jockey in American Thoroughbred horse racing. An Indo-Jamaican, he is the son of a jockey who rode in Jamaica before relocating to Florida where he began a career as a horse trainer.

Rajiv Maragh rode his first winner at Tampa Bay Downs on February 1, 2003. He got his big break in 2008 when he was 14th in the national earnings list. Rapidly developing into a top jockey since moving north to compete at NYRA tracks, in 2009 he has been a winner of several Grade 1 races.

He was seriously injured in a spill at Belmont Park in July 2015 and has been cleared in November 2016 to start riding again.

He rode Mucho Macho Man to a 3rd-place finish at the 2011 Kentucky Derby. He rode his first Breeder's Cup winner on Caleb's Posse in the dirt mile.

In 2017 he relocated to California and the same year was honored with Comeback Jockey Of The Year Award.

== Year-end charts ==
Chart (2005–present)	Rank by earnings
National Earnings List for Jockeys 2005	72
National Earnings List for Jockeys 2006	62
National Earnings List for Jockeys 2007	40
National Earnings List for Jockeys 2008	14
National Earnings List for Jockeys 2009	8
National Earnings List for Jockeys 2010	19
National Earnings List for Jockeys 2011	11
National Earnings List for Jockeys 2012	14
National Earnings List for Jockeys 2013	18
National Earnings List for Jockeys 2014	16
National Earnings List for Jockeys 2015	93
National Earnings List for Jockeys 2016	343
National Earnings List for Jockeys 2017	26
National Earnings List for Jockeys 2018	67
