= Chop Chop (horse) =

American-bred Thoroughbred racehorse

- Sire: Flares
- Grandsire: Gallant Fox
- Dam: Sceptical
- Damsire: Buchan
- Sex: Stallion
- Foaled: 1940
- Country: Canada
- Colour: Bay
- Owner: 1) Josephine Douglas; 2) E. P. Taylor (1952)
- Trainer: Harris B. Brown
- Record: 11: 4-4-2
- Earnings: US$36,600

Major wins
- Endurance Handicap (1942); Empire City Handicap (1943)

Awards
- Leading sire in Canada (1959, 1960, 1961, 1962, 1963)

Honours
- Canadian Horse Racing Hall of Fame (1977)
- Last updated on February 7, 2010

Chop Chop (1940–1963) was an American Thoroughbred racehorse who was inducted in the Canadian Horse Racing Hall of Fame. He was sired by Flares, a son of U.S. Triple Crown winner Gallant Fox and a full brother to U.S. Triple Crown winner Omaha. Flares raced in England with considerable success for owner William Woodward Sr., counting the Ascot Gold Cup, Champion Stakes and Princess of Wales's Stakes among his wins.

Purchased as a yearling for $4,100 by Josephine Douglas of Oyster Bay, New York, Chop Chop saw his racing career cut short due to an injury. From eleven starts, he won four times and finished out of the money once. His most important wins came in the 1942 Endurance Handicap at Bowie Race Track in Bowie, Maryland and the 1943 Empire City Handicap at New York's Jamaica Race Course, in which he beat Princequillo in track record time.

== Stud record ==
Retired to stud duty, Chop Chop was sent to a breeding farm in Kentucky but in 1945 was leased by Gil Darlington, owner of Trafalgar Farm near Oakville, Ontario. Not given much consideration by most in the racing industry, Chop Chop did not attract any top-quality mares for breeding. As a result, his first five years in Canada showed no significant offspring until after he was sold, when Chain Reaction began winning major races in 1953.

Chop Chop's breeding career changed when E. P. Taylor bought him at a dispersal sale and stood him at his National Stud of Canada in Oshawa, Ontario. Chop Chop was mated to Taylor's mare Iribelle, and their daughter Canadiana was foaled in 1950. Canadiana's success in racing resulted in Chop Chop being bred to the best of the Taylor mares and as a consequence, he was the leading sire in Canada from 1959 through 1963.

Among his progeny, Chop Chop was the sire of four Queen's Plate winners and two Hall of Fame inductees:

- Canadiana (b. 1950) - a filly, she won the 1953 Queen's Plate and was the first Canadian-bred to earn more than $100,000. Voted 1952 Canadian Horse of the Year, a Canadian Horse Racing Hall of Fame inductee;
- Lyford Cay (b. 1954), won 1957 Queen's Plate;
- Victoria Park (b. 1957) - won 1960 Queen's Plate, voted Canadian Horse of the Year, a Canadian Horse Racing Hall of Fame inductee, Leading broodmare sire in Great Britain & Ireland (1977), sire of three Queen's Plate winners;
- Blue Light (b. 1958) - won 1961 Queen's Plate.

Through his daughter Ciboulette, Chop Chop was the damsire of Eclipse and Sovereign Award winner and Canadian Horse Racing Hall of Fame inductee, Fanfreluche. Chop Chop's bloodline endures in the 2015 U.S. Triple Crown winner, American Pharoah, who is a seventh-generation descendant.

For his contribution to Canadian racing, in 1977 Chop Chop was inducted into the Canadian Horse Racing Hall of Fame.

== Pedigree ==
Pedigree of Chop Chop
Sire Flares	Gallant Fox	Sir Gallahad	Teddy
Sire Flares	Gallant Fox	Sir Gallahad	Plucky Liege
Sire Flares	Gallant Fox	Marguerite	Celt
Sire Flares	Gallant Fox	Marguerite	Fairy Ray
Sire Flares	Flambino	Wrack	Robert Le Diable
Sire Flares	Flambino	Wrack	Samphire
Sire Flares	Flambino	Flambette	Durbar
Sire Flares	Flambino	Flambette	La Flambee
Dam Sceptical	Buchan	Sunstar	Sundridge
Dam Sceptical	Buchan	Sunstar	Doris
Dam Sceptical	Buchan	Hamoaze	Torpoint
Dam Sceptical	Buchan	Hamoaze	Maid Of The Mist
Dam Sceptical	Clodagh	Tredennis	Kendal
Dam Sceptical	Clodagh	Tredennis	St. Marguerite
Dam Sceptical	Clodagh	Clare	Desmond
Dam Sceptical	Clodagh	Clare	Sheila
