= Canadiana (horse) =

Canadian-bred Thoroughbred racehorse

- Sire: Chop Chop
- Grandsire: Flares
- Dam: Iribelle
- Damsire: Osiris
- Sex: Mare
- Foaled: 1950
- Country: Canada
- Colour: Bay
- Breeder: E. P. Taylor
- Owner: E. P. Taylor
- Trainer: Gordon J. McCann
- Record: 62: 20-9-11
- Earnings: $173,116

Major wins
- Princess Elizabeth Stakes (1952); Cup and Saucer Stakes (1952); Coronation Futurity Stakes (1952); Test Stakes (1953); Vagrancy Handicap (1954); Highlander Stakes (1955); Jacques Cartier Stakes (1955) Canadian Classic Race wins: Queen's Plate (1953)

Awards
- Canadian Horse of the Year (1952)

Honours
- Canadian Horse Racing Hall of Fame (1978)
- Last updated on August 25, 2008

Canadiana (1950–1971) was the first Canadian-bred racehorse to earn more than $100,000 Canadian. She was bred by E. P. Taylor at his National Stud near Oshawa, Ontario. Sired by Taylor's stallion, Chop Chop who would go on to sire three more Queen's Plate winners, her dam Iribelle was also owned by Taylor. Canadiana's British-born damsire Osiris was the Leading sire in Canada in 1938, 1940, 1942, and 1947.

== Horse of the Year ==
Trained by Gordon J. "Pete" McCann, at age two Canadiana was not only the dominant horse of her age group, female or male, she was the dominant horse irrespective of age. She won the top races for her age group in Canada and set a new track record for 5½ furlongs in winning a stakes race event at Randall Park Race Track in North Randall, Ohio. She was voted 1952 Canadian Horse of the Year honors.

At age three, Canadiana ran fourth in the Plate Trial Stakes but returned to form to beat male horses again, scoring a five-length victory under future U.S. Racing Hall of Fame jockey Eddie Arcaro in Canada's most prestigious race, the Queen's Plate. She went on to win against fillies in the Test Stakes at Saratoga Race Course in Saratoga Springs, New York.

As a four-year-old, Canadiana raced against some of the top fillies in the United States. Her best results were a win of the 1954 Vagrancy Handicap at Aqueduct Racetrack in Queens, New York and seconds in the Gazelle and Diana Handicaps. Canadiana raced as a five-year-old, winning the Highlander and Jacques Cartier Stakes at Woodbine.

Retired to broodmare duty at Windfields Farm, Canadiana produced six foals but only one became a stakes-race winner.

On her death in 1971, Canadiana was given a place of honor next to the great Northern Dancer in the Windfields Farm equine cemetery.

In 1978, Canadiana was inducted in the Canadian Horse Racing Hall of Fame.

== Pedigree ==
Pedigree of Canadiana, bay mare, 1950
Sire Chop Chop	Flares	Gallant Fox	Sir Gallahad III
Sire Chop Chop	Flares	Gallant Fox	Marguerite
Sire Chop Chop	Flares	Flambino	Wrack
Sire Chop Chop	Flares	Flambino	Flambette
Sire Chop Chop	Sceptical	Buchan	Sunstar
Sire Chop Chop	Sceptical	Buchan	Hamoaze
Sire Chop Chop	Sceptical	Clodagh	Tredennis
Sire Chop Chop	Sceptical	Clodagh	Clare
Dam Iribelle	Osiris	Papyrus	Tracery
Dam Iribelle	Osiris	Papyrus	Miss Matty
Dam Iribelle	Osiris	Most Beautiful	Great Sport
Dam Iribelle	Osiris	Most Beautiful	Rayon
Dam Iribelle	Belmona	King James	Plaudit
Dam Iribelle	Belmona	King James	Unsightly
Dam Iribelle	Belmona	Belmon	Superman
Dam Iribelle	Belmona	Belmon	Bellamia (family: 10-c)
