= Lyford Cay (horse) =

Canadian-bred Thoroughbred racehorse

- Sire: Chop Chop
- Grandsire: Flares
- Dam: Famous Maid
- Damsire: Fairaris
- Sex: Gelding
- Foaled: 1954
- Country: Canada
- Colour: Bay
- Breeder: E. P. Taylor
- Owner: E. P. Taylor
- Trainer: Gordon J. McCann
- Record: 11: 7-?-?
- Earnings: Can$43,475

Major wins
- Plate Trial Stakes (1957); Woodstock Stakes (1957); Canadian Classic Race wins: Queen's Plate (1957)

Lyford Cay (foaled 1954 in Ontario) was a Canadian Thoroughbred Gelding racehorse who in 1957 won the 98th running of the Queen's Plate, Canada's most prestigious race and North America's oldest annually run stakes race.

== Background ==
Out of the mare, Famous Maid, Lyford Cay's sire was Canadian Horse Racing Hall of Fame inductee and sire of four Queen's Plate winners, Chop Chop. Bred by prominent breeder/owner E. P. Taylor, in 1955 the unnamed yearling was purchased by Jim Boylen at Taylor's annual yearling sale but Boylen soon came to believe the horse had knee problems and returned him. Before turning him over to trainer "Pete" McCann, Taylor named the colt for Lyford Cay on New Providence Island in the Bahamas, an exclusive residential community developed by Taylor and where he maintained a home.

== Racing career ==
In the two top races of 1956 for Canadian Juveniles, Lyford Cay finished second in the Coronation Futurity Stakes and third in the Cup and Saucer Stakes. As a three-year-old, Lyford Cay won the Plate Trial Stakes and then on June 8, the Queen's Plate itself, capturing the mile and a quarter event in track record time of 2:02 3/5. Later that month he won the Woodstock Stakes following the disqualification of winner, Pink Velvet.

== Pedigree ==
Pedigree of Lyford Cay, bay gelding, 1954
Sire Chop Chop	Flares	Gallant Fox	Sir Gallahad III
Sire Chop Chop	Flares	Gallant Fox	Marguerite
Sire Chop Chop	Flares	Flambino	Wrack
Sire Chop Chop	Flares	Flambino	Flambette
Sire Chop Chop	Sceptical	Buchan	Sunstar
Sire Chop Chop	Sceptical	Buchan	Hamoaze
Sire Chop Chop	Sceptical	Clodagh	Tredennis
Sire Chop Chop	Sceptical	Clodagh	Clare
Dam Famous Maid	Fairaris	Fair Trial	Fairway
Dam Famous Maid	Fairaris	Fair Trial	Lay Juror
Dam Famous Maid	Fairaris	Nunnery	Friar Marcus
Dam Famous Maid	Fairaris	Nunnery	Picardy
Dam Famous Maid	Phylsovina	Sandwich	Sansovino
Dam Famous Maid	Phylsovina	Sandwich	Waffles
Dam Famous Maid	Phylsovina	Sundergain	Gainsborough
Dam Famous Maid	Phylsovina	Sundergain	Phyllis Dare (family: 5-d)
