= Blue Light (horse) =

Canadian-bred Thoroughbred racehorse

- Sire: Chop Chop
- Grandsire: Flares
- Dam: Blen Lark
- Damsire: Blenheim
- Sex: Stallion
- Foaled: 1958
- Country: Canada
- Colour: Bay
- Breeder: E. P. Taylor
- Owner: Col. Kenric R. Marshall
- Trainer: Patrick MacMurchy
- Record: not found
- Earnings: Can$ not found

Major wins
- Queen's Plate (1961)
- Last updated on February 18, 2010

Blue Light (foaled 1958 in Ontario) was a Canadian Thoroughbred racehorse.

== Background ==
Blue Light was a bay horse bred in Ontario by E. P. Taylor. He was sired by Canadian Horse Racing Hall of Fame inductee, Chop Chop. His dam, Blen Lark, was a daughter of Blenheim, the 1930 Epsom Derby winner and Leading sire in North America in 1941. Blue Light was purchased and raced by eighty-one-year-old Col. Kenric R. Marshall, a decorated World War I soldier who later commanded the 48th Highlanders of Canada, who was a highly successful businessman. A long time participant in the Canadian racing industry, Marshall served as Chairman of the Ontario Jockey Club and owned 1957 Canadian Horse of the Year, Hartney.

== Racing career ==
Blue Light showed little promise as a two-year-old in 1960 but who won the 1961 Queen's Plate, Canada's most prestigious race and North America's oldest annually run stakes race.

== Pedigree ==
Pedigree of Blue Light, bay stallion, 1958
Sire Chop Chop	Flares	Gallant Fox	Sir Gallahad III
Sire Chop Chop	Flares	Gallant Fox	Marguerite
Sire Chop Chop	Flares	Flambino	Wrack
Sire Chop Chop	Flares	Flambino	Flambette
Sire Chop Chop	Sceptical	Buchan	Sunstar
Sire Chop Chop	Sceptical	Buchan	Hamoaze
Sire Chop Chop	Sceptical	Clodagh	Tredennis
Sire Chop Chop	Sceptical	Clodagh	Clare
Dam Blen Lark	Blenheim	Blanford	Swynford
Dam Blen Lark	Blenheim	Blanford	Blanche
Dam Blen Lark	Blenheim	Malva	Charles O'Malley
Dam Blen Lark	Blenheim	Malva	Wild Arum
Dam Blen Lark	Light Lark	Blue Larkspur	Black Servant
Dam Blen Lark	Light Lark	Blue Larkspur	Blossom Time
Dam Blen Lark	Light Lark	Ruddy Light	Honeywood
Dam Blen Lark	Light Lark	Ruddy Light	Washoe Belle (family: 9-c)
