= Boswell (horse) =

British-bred Thoroughbred racehorse

- Sire: Bosworth
- Grandsire: Son-in-Law
- Dam: Flying Gall
- Damsire: Sir Gallahad
- Sex: Stallion
- Foaled: 1933
- Country: United Kingdom
- Colour: Bay
- Breeder: William Woodward Sr.
- Owner: William Woodward
- Trainer: Cecil Boyd-Rochfort
- Record: 17: 3-2-2
- Earnings: £19,837 (1936 & 1937)

Major wins
- St Leger (1936); Eclipse Stakes (1937)

Boswell (1933 – 1949) was a British Thoroughbred racehorse and sire. He showed promise when winning his final start as a two-year-old and was considered a contender for the following year's classic races. In 1936 he was slow to find his best form and ran unplaced in both the 2000 Guineas and the Epsom Derby before recording an upset victory in the St Leger at Doncaster Racecourse in September. As a four-year-old he again upset the odds to take the Eclipse Stakes at 20/1 but failed to win again and was retired from racing at the end of the following year. He later stood as a breeding stallion in the United States, where he had some success as a sire of winners.

== Background ==
Boswell was a bay horse, bred and owned by the American banker William Woodward Sr. He was trained throughout his racing career by Cecil Boyd-Rochfort at his Freemason Lodge stable in Newmarket, Suffolk.

Boswell was probably the best horse sired by Lord Derby's stallion Bosworth who finished second in the St Leger in 1929 and won the Ascot Gold Cup in the following year. Boswell's dam Flying Gal was bred in the United States and finished third in the Alabama Stakes in 1930. She was a daughter of the French broodmare Filante whose other descendants have included Wonder Where, War Emblem, Dancing Spree and Lady Pitt.

== Racing career ==
=== 1935: two-year-old season ===
Boswell did not appear as a two-year-old until the autumn of 1935 when he was beaten in his first two starts before winning the Hurst Stakes. In the Free Handicap, a ranking of the best British juveniles he was assigned a weight of 123 pounds, ten pounds behind the top-rated Bala Hissar. He attracted considerable attention as a promising colt and a possible Derby contender.

=== 1936: three-year-old season ===
Boswell was beaten in the Column Produce Stakes on his three-year-old debut and then finished unplaced behind Lord Astor's Pay Up in the 2000 Guineas at Newmarket. He took his place in the field for the Derby on 27 May but after a brief effort approaching the straight he faded to finish unplaced as the Aga Khan's Mahmoud won from Taj Akbar and Thankerton. The colt was beaten again in the Jersey Stakes at Royal Ascot and was equipped with blinkers for the Lingfield Park Plate over one mile in which he was easily beaten by the four-year-old Fair Trial in the two-runner. After an unplaced effort behind Rhodes Scholar in the Eclipse Stakes he showed better form to take third place behind Esquemeling in the Great Yorkshire Stakes at York Racecourse in August.

On 9 September at Doncaster Racecourse Boswell, ridden by Pat Beasley, started a 20/1 outsider for the 161st running of the St Leger Stakes over 14 1/2 furlongs. He had not been regarded as his stable's best contender for the event but moved into contention when both Precipitation and Flares were withdrawn. The other twelve runners included Mahmoud, Rhodes Scholar (the favourite), Thankerton and Esquemeling. Boswell started well before settling behind the leaders as Pizarro set the pace from a closely grouped field. Entering the straight, Pizarro dropped away and Fearless Fox went to the front followed by Boswell, Mahmoud, Thankerton and Magnet. The closing stages of the race developed into a "most exciting duel" between Fearless Fox and Boswell with the latter gaining the advantage in the final strides to win by three quarters of a length. There was a gap of three lengths back to Mahmoud, who held off Magnet to take third place.

After the race Boyd-Rochfort said "I have always considered Boswell to be a great horse [and] told everyone to back him for the Derby". Pat Beasley commented "I always felt I would win... The funny thing about Boswell is that he has always been a good horse but has only just proved it. Possibly he is an autumn horse." Boswell returned to Newmarket with heavy bandaging on his left hind leg, having developed what was described as "heel bug".

On his final start of the season, Boswell finished second to his stablemate Precipitation in the Jockey Club Stakes over fourteen furlongs at Newmarket on 1 October. In 1936 Boswell earned £10,554 making him the second biggest money-winner of the year behind Rhodes Scholar.

=== 1937: four-year-old season ===
Boswell began his third season with a defeat in the Heathcote Stakes and then finished unplaced behind Precipitation in the Ascot Gold Cup, in which he apparently failed to stay the two and a half mile distance. For his next race he was dropped back in distance for the £9,283 Eclipse Stakes over ten furlongs at Sandown Park Racecourse on 17 July and started at 20/1 in a six-runner field headed by Rhodes Scholar. Boyd-Rochfort expressed little confidence in the horse's prospects and William Woodward did not bother to attend the event. With Beasley in the saddle, Boswell took the lead early in the straight and recorded his second upset victory in a major race as he won by a length from Daytona, who had been racing along the stands-side rail on the opposite side of the track. Monument was a further length away in third while Rhodes Scholar, who appeared to be uncomfortable on the hard ground came home fifth. Despite very few of the crowd having backed him, Boswell was given a "cordial round of applause" as he returned to the unsaddling enclosure.

=== 1938: five-year-old season ===
Boswell remained in training as a five-year-old but his form was disappointing. In June he made a second attempt to win the Ascot Gold Cup, but as in the previous year he made no impact and finished unplaced behind a stablemate as the race was won by Flares. At Newmarket in August he started 5/4 favourite for the Dullingham Stakes but came home last of the three runners, prompting comments to the effect that Woodward had made a mistake by keeping the horse in training.

== Assessment and honours ==
In their book, A Century of Champions, based on the Timeform rating system, John Randall and Tony Morris rated Boswell an "average" winner of the St Leger.

== Stud record ==
Woodward retired Boswell fromracing at the end of 1938 and imported him to the United States where the horse stood as a breeding stallion until his death in 1949. Boswell was not conspicuously successful as a sire of winners but did get some good horses including:

- Round View (brown, 1943) winner of the Flamingo Stakes, Monmouth Handicap and Whitney Stakes.
- Lord Boswell (brown, 1943) winner of the Endurance Handicap, Remsen Stakes and Blue Grass Stakes; second in the Preakness Stakes.
- Cochise (grey, 1946) winner of the Massachusetts Handicap, Saratoga Cup, Arlington Handicap and Grey Lag Handicap.

== Pedigree ==
Pedigree of Boswell (GB), bay stallion, 1933
Sire Bosworth (GB) 1926	Son-in-Law (GB); 1911	Dark Ronald (IRE)	Bay Ronald (GB)*
Sire Bosworth (GB) 1926	Son-in-Law (GB); 1911	Dark Ronald (IRE)	Darkie (GB)
Sire Bosworth (GB) 1926	Son-in-Law (GB); 1911	Mother-in-Law	Matchmaker
Sire Bosworth (GB) 1926	Son-in-Law (GB); 1911	Mother-in-Law	Be Cannie
Sire Bosworth (GB) 1926	Serenissima (GB); 1913	Minoru	Cyllene
Sire Bosworth (GB) 1926	Serenissima (GB); 1913	Minoru	Mother Siegel
Sire Bosworth (GB) 1926	Serenissima (GB); 1913	Gondolette	Loved One
Sire Bosworth (GB) 1926	Serenissima (GB); 1913	Gondolette	Dongola
Dam Flying Gal (USA) 1927	Sir Gallahad (FR); 1920	Teddy	Ajax*
Dam Flying Gal (USA) 1927	Sir Gallahad (FR); 1920	Teddy	Rondeau (GB)*
Dam Flying Gal (USA) 1927	Sir Gallahad (FR); 1920	Plucky Liege (GB)	Spearmint
Dam Flying Gal (USA) 1927	Sir Gallahad (FR); 1920	Plucky Liege (GB)	Concertina
Dam Flying Gal (USA) 1927	Filante (FR); 1916	Sardanapale	Prestige
Dam Flying Gal (USA) 1927	Filante (FR); 1916	Sardanapale	Gemma (GB)
Dam Flying Gal (USA) 1927	Filante (FR); 1916	High Flyer (GB)	Flying Fox*
Dam Flying Gal (USA) 1927	Filante (FR); 1916	High Flyer (GB)	Altesse (Family: 20-b)

* Boswell is inbred 4S x 5D to the stallion Bay Ronald, meaning that he appears fourth generation on the sire side of his pedigree, and fifth generation (via Rondeau) on the dam side of his pedigree.

* Boswell is inbred 5D x 4D to the stallion Flying Fox, meaning that he appears fifth generation (via Ajax) and fourth generation on the sire side of his pedigree.
