= Palestinian (horse) =

American thoroughbred racehorse

- Sire: Sun Again
- Grandsire: Sun Teddy
- Dam: Dolly Whisk
- Damsire: Whiskaway
- Sex: Stallion
- Foaled: 1946
- Country: United States
- Colour: Bay
- Breeder: Isidor Bieber & Hirsch Jacobs
- Owner: Isidor Bieber
- Trainer: Hirsch Jacobs
- Record: 45: 14-9-8
- Earnings: US$296,525

Major wins
- Endurance Handicap (1948); Jersey Stakes (1949); Empire City Handicap (1949); Westchester Handicap (1950); Brooklyn Handicap (1951); Golden Gate Handicap (1951) U.S. Triple Crown placings: Kentucky Derby 3rd (1949); Preakness Stakes 2nd (1949); Belmont Stakes 3rd (1949)

Palestinian (foaled 1946 at Old Hickory Farm near Lexington, Kentucky) was an American Thoroughbred racehorse whose wins included the important Brooklyn Handicap and the Jersey Stakes in which he set a new track record. In the 1949 U.S. Triple Crown series, he finished second in the Preakness Stakes and third in both the Kentucky Derby and Belmont Stakes.

Bred by longtime racing partners Isidor Bieber and trainer Hirsch Jacobs, Palestinian was raced in Bieber's name throughout his career.

In addition to racing success, Palestinian was the sire of the very good runner Promised Land who more importantly was the damsire of Hall of Fame inductee Spectacular Bid who won the Kentucky Derby and Preakness Stakes. Palestinian was also the damsire of Skip Trial who sired Hall of Fame inductee Skip Away.

== Pedigree ==
Pedigree of Palestinian, chestnut colt, 1946
| Sire Sun Again | Sun Teddy | Teddy | Ajax |
| Sire Sun Again | Sun Teddy | Teddy | Rondeau |
| Sire Sun Again | Sun Teddy | Sunmelia | Sun Briar |
| Sire Sun Again | Sun Teddy | Sunmelia | Bromelia |
| Sire Sun Again | Hug Again | Stimulus | Ultimus |
| Sire Sun Again | Hug Again | Stimulus | Hurakan |
| Sire Sun Again | Hug Again | Affection | Isidor |
| Sire Sun Again | Hug Again | Affection | One I Love |
| Dam Dolly Whisk | Whiskaway | Whisk Broom II | Broomstick |
| Dam Dolly Whisk | Whiskaway | Whisk Broom II | Audience |
| Dam Dolly Whisk | Whiskaway | Inaugural | Voter |
| Dam Dolly Whisk | Whiskaway | Inaugural | Court Dress |
| Dam Dolly Whisk | Dolly Seth | Seth | Adam |
| Dam Dolly Whisk | Dolly Seth | Seth | Purity |
| Dam Dolly Whisk | Dolly Seth | Royal Dolly | Right Royal |
| Dam Dolly Whisk | Dolly Seth | Royal Dolly | Pretty Polly (family: 4-r) |
