= Granville (horse) =

American-bred Thoroughbred racehorse

- Sire: Gallant Fox
- Grandsire: Sir Gallahad III
- Dam: Gravita
- Damsire: Sarmatian
- Sex: Stallion
- Foaled: 1933
- Country: United States
- Colour: Bay
- Breeder: Belair Stud
- Owner: William Woodward Sr.
- Trainer: Sunny Jim Fitzsimmons
- Record: 18: 8-4-3
- Earnings: $111,820

Major wins
- Arlington Classic (1936); Saratoga Cup (1936); Lawrence Realization Stakes (1936); Kenner Stakes (1936); Travers Stakes (1936) American Classic Race wins: Belmont Stakes (1936)

Awards
- U.S. Champion 3-Yr-Old Colt (1936); Horse of the Year (1936)

Honours
- United States' Racing Hall of Fame (1997)
- Last updated on April 14, 2007

Granville (1933–1951) was an American Hall of Fame Thoroughbred racehorse. He was the leading American colt of his generation, winning the Belmont Stakes and being voted Horse of the Year.

== Background ==
Owned and bred by prominent horseman William Woodward Sr. at his Belair Stud in Bowie, Maryland, Granville was sired by U.S. Triple Crown winner Gallant Fox and out of the mare Gravita.

== Racing career ==
=== 1935: two-year-old season ===
Racing at age two under future Hall of Fame trainer Sunny Jim Fitzsimmons, Granville won one of seven starts with his most noteworthy finish in a major race coming in the Champagne Stakes, in which he finished third.

=== 1936: three-year-old season ===
The following year, in the run-up to the 1936 Kentucky Derby, Granville finished a strong second to Teufel in the Wood Memorial Stakes. In the Derby, won by Bold Venture, shortly after the start Granville threw jockey James Stout and as such finished last in the fourteen-horse field. He then finished second by a nose to Bold Venture in the Preakness Stakes. In the Belmont Stakes in June, he won by a nose in a photo finish from Mr. Bones. Granville also won the 1936 Arlington Classic at 1 1/4 miles (2.0 km) plus much longer races, such as the 1 5/8 miles (2.6 km) Lawrence Realization Stakes, and he defeated the great Discovery by eight lengths in the 1 3/4-mile (2.8 km) Saratoga Cup. He was named American Horse of the Year in a poll of journalists conducted by Turf and Sport Digest magazine.

== Stud record ==
Retired from racing after an ankle injury, Granville finished the year with seven wins and three seconds in his eleven starts and was voted U.S. Champion 3-Yr-Old Colt and the most prestigious honor in American Thoroughbred racing, Horse of the Year. Sent to horse breeding duty at his owners' stud farm, he was less than successful as a sire, with his last issue foaled in 1949.

== Honors ==
In 1997, Granville was inducted in the United States' National Museum of Racing and Hall of Fame.

== Pedigree ==
Pedigree of Granville, bay stallion, 1933
| Sire Gallant Fox | Sir Gallahad III | Teddy | Ajax |
| Sire Gallant Fox | Sir Gallahad III | Teddy | Rondeau |
| Sire Gallant Fox | Sir Gallahad III | Plucky Liege | Spearmint |
| Sire Gallant Fox | Sir Gallahad III | Plucky Liege | Concertina |
| Sire Gallant Fox | Marguerite | Celt | Commando |
| Sire Gallant Fox | Marguerite | Celt | Maid of Erin |
| Sire Gallant Fox | Marguerite | Fairy Ray | Radium |
| Sire Gallant Fox | Marguerite | Fairy Ray | Seraph |
| Dam Gravita | Sarmatian | Sardanapale | Prestige |
| Dam Gravita | Sarmatian | Sardanapale | Gemma |
| Dam Gravita | Sarmatian | Mousse des Bois | Ajax |
| Dam Gravita | Sarmatian | Mousse des Bois | Rose Mousse |
| Dam Gravita | Gravitate | Rock View | Rock Sand |
| Dam Gravita | Gravitate | Rock View | Golden View |
| Dam Gravita | Gravitate | Lady Carnot | Radium |
| Dam Gravita | Gravitate | Lady Carnot | Gravitation (family: 1-h) |
