= William Saunders (jockey) =

Canadian jockey

William “Smokey” Saunders
- Saunders in 1935

Personal information
- Born: April 13, 1915 Bozeman, Montana
- Died: July 30, 1986 (aged 71) Naples, Florida
- Occupation: Jockey

Horse racing career
- Sport: Horse racing
- Career wins: not found

Major racing wins
- Rochambeau Handicap (1934); Santa Anita Oaks (1935); Nursery Handicap (1935); Saratoga Handicap (1935); South Shore Purse (1935); Chicago Derby (1936); Detroit Derby (1936); Fashion Stakes (1936); Monrovia Handicap (1936); San Juan Capistrano Handicap (1936); Aberdeen Stakes (1937); Black-Eyed Susan Stakes (1937); New Year Stakes (1937); Santa Margarita Invitational Handicap (1937); Ladies Stakes (1939); Governor Caldwell Handicap (1948); Louisiana Derby (1948); St. Patrick Purse (1949) American Classic Race wins: Kentucky Derby (1935); Preakness Stakes (1935); Belmont Stakes (1935)

Honours
- Canadian Horse Racing Hall of Fame (1976)

Significant horses
- Faireno, Omaha, Whopper

William "Smokey" Saunders (April 13, 1915 – July 30, 1986) was a Canadian Horse Racing Hall of Fame jockey in Thoroughbred horse racing and won the United States Triple Crown of Thoroughbred Racing on Omaha in 1935. News reports in Saunders’ lifetime used both the nicknames “Willie” and “Smokey.”

== Early years ==
Though considered a Canadian, Saunders was born in Bozeman, Montana in 1915. He moved with his family to Calgary, Alberta when he was eight years old. There, he spent time at Canadian tracks as a hot walker and exercise boy. As a teenager, Saunders returned to Bozeman, where he lived with an uncle, Guy Saunders, attended high school, and rode races at small tracks in Montana. Saunders moved to California in 1932.

== Career ==
In California, Saunders began riding under contract for trainer L.T. Whitehill, and earned his first major win at Tanforan Racetrack in northern California on April 4, 1932. Competing at tracks in southern California, Alberta-born U.S. Racing Hall of Fame jockey George Woolf tutored Saunders on riding.

Saunders next moved to the east coast. There, Saunders rode for prominent owners such as Wheatley Stable, Hal Price Headley, and William Woodward. He won the 1934 Rochambeau Handicap at Narragansett Park aboard Woodward's Belair Stud colt Faireno, who was trained by "Sunny Jim" Fitzsimmons. Fitzsimmons then put Saunders aboard the colt Omaha, and in 1935 they won the U.S. Triple Crown with victories in the Kentucky Derby, Preakness Stakes, and Belmont Stakes. In 1935, Saunders also won the inaugural Santa Anita Oaks aboard Dunlin Lady. After his rise to fame as a jockey, he also had a minor role in the comedic film Mr. Celebrity (1941) in which he played himself.

Weight problems interrupted his career, as did the outbreak of World War II, when he joined the United States Army and served overseas in the Pacific Theater. During his four years in the military, a bout of malaria, contracted while overseas, resulted in considerable weight loss that allowed him to resume his career in racing once the war ended. In 1948, Saunders rode Bovard to victory in the Louisiana Derby, then rode the colt to a third-place finish in the Preakness Stakes.

When his riding career ended in 1950, Saunders worked as a trainer before becoming a racing official at racetracks in Illinois, New Jersey, and Calder Race Course in Florida.

On its formation in 1976, Saunders was inducted into the Canadian Horse Racing Hall of Fame.

== Personal life ==
After his Triple Crown win, Saunders was embroiled in a murder scandal in October 1935. He and a friend, Walter Schaeffer, went out on the town in Louisville, Kentucky, where they met two women at a bar and the foursome proceeded to carouse well into the night. While driving on a dark road, one of the women, Evelyn Sliwinski, vomited in the car and Saunders made her leave the vehicle. The other three drove off, leaving Sliwinski staggering on the road. Schaeffer was driving, and the three decided to turn around to go back to Sliwinski, but did not see her. While driving down the road, they felt the car hit something but Schaeffer thought it was a rock and did not stop to see what happened. Two teenagers discovered Sliwinski's body later that night. The next day, the other woman, Agnes Mackinson, reported what she witnessed to the police. Soon, Schaeffer was charged with murder and Saunders indicted as an accessory. Because there was also an allegation that Philip Scholtz, one of the teens who found the body, had told witnesses he thought he had struck Sliwinski, there was sufficient reasonable doubt raised and Schaeffer was acquitted. Saunders’ charges were dropped. Though found not guilty, the two men did pay $10,000 to settle a civil lawsuit brought by Sliwinski's heirs.

On June 29, 1936, Saunders married Pauline Waterbury of Detroit.

Living in retirement in Hallandale, Florida, he was diagnosed with cancer of the brain and lungs, and five weeks after he died in a Naples, Florida, hospital on July 30, 1986, at age 71.
