= Marguerite (horse) =

American Thoroughbred racehorse and broodmare

- Marguerite's grave at Claiborne Farm
- Sire: Celt
- Grandsire: Commando
- Dam: Fairy Ray
- Damsire: Radium
- Sex: Mare
- Foaled: April 24, 1920
- Died: October 27, 1945 (aged 25)
- Country: United States
- Color: Chestnut
- Breeder: Claiborne Farm
- Owner: Belair Stud (William Woodward Sr.)

Honors
- Marguerite Stakes at Pimlico Race Course

Marguerite (April 24, 1920 – October 27, 1945) was an American Thoroughbred racemare owned by Belair Stud who had to be retired after only one start but who established her place in racing history as the dam of four significant runners.

== A broodmare's place in racing history ==
A 1946 Daily Racing Form article lamented the fact that when a sire of one or more outstanding runners dies there will be much written about that stallion in country's all over the world. Conversely, when a mare who has produced similar such successful offspring, scant little will be reported on her accomplishment. That same article recounted a story by the sports Editor of the Atlanta Journal about his visit to Claiborne Farm and the gravesite of Marguerite. The Daily Racing Form commented that Arthur Hancock telling the reporter he was saving a space next to her for Sir Gallahad III was "one of the most romantic stories in the annals of the world's turf".

== Breeding ==
Marguerite was purchased as a yearling by William Woodward at a 1921 Saratoga sale. Her sire was Celt, winner of the 1907 Junior Champion Stakes and the 1908 Brooklyn Handicap who would be the Leading sire in North America in 1921. Celt was a son of the great Commando, an American Horse of the Year and U.S. Racing Hall of Fame inductee. Commando also sired Hall of Fame champions Colin and Peter Pan. Marguerite's dam was the English mare Fairy Ray, a daughter of Radium who was a successful runner for Leopold de Rothschild. Dam Fairy Ray also produced the multiple stakes winning colt Cloudland (1922) by Wrack.

== Marguerite's best ==
The most successful of Marguerite's progeny were:

- Petee-Wrack (1925) by Wrack — bred by Belair Stud but foaled at Arthur Hancock's Ellerslie Stud in Albemarle County, Virginia, he was purchased and raced by John R. Macomber. Among Petee-Wrack's race wins were the 1928 Travers Stakes in which he defeated Reigh Count, the 1929 Twin City, Merchants and Citizens and Metropolitan Handicaps, and the 1930 Suburban Handicap.

Petee-Wrack's offspring included Widener Challenge Cup winner Columbiana, Grand National winner Brother Jones, and Maryland Hunt Cup winners Peterski and Pine Rep.

After 1925, Marguerite was moved to Hancock's Claiborne Farm in Kentucky, where all her future foals were born. Three of Marguerite's best progeny were sired by Sir Gallahad III, a French-bred stallion that had been bought in 1926 by an American syndicate when standing at stud for owner Jefferson Davis Cohn at his Haras du Bois-Roussel near Alençon in Normandy, France. The syndicate was made up of Robert A. Fairbairn, William Woodward Sr., Marshall Field III, and Arthur B. Hancock.

- Gallant Fox (1927) by Sir Gallahad III — 1930 Triple Crown winner and U.S. Racing Hall of Fame inductee.

Among his progeny were 1935 Triple Crown winner Omaha. Through 2019 Gallant Fox remains the only U.S. Triple Crown winner to sire another U. S. Triple Crown winner. As well, Gallant Fox was the sire of Granville, the 1936 American Horse of the Year and a Hall of Fame inductee. Gallant Fox also sired Omaha's full brother Flares, who in 1936 had won the Newmarket Stakes sand in 1938 became only the second American-bred to ever win England's Ascot Gold Cup.

- Fighting Fox (1935) by Sir Gallahad III — wins included the Grand Union Hotel Stakes, the Wood Memorial Stakes, Carter Handicap, Jamaica Handicap, and the Fleetwing Handicap in which he broke an Empire City track record that had stood for twenty-one years. Four days later he won the Massachusetts Handicap.

Fighting Fox was the sire of Crafty Admiral, a 1952 Champion and the 1978 Leading broodmare sire in North America.

- Foxbrough (1936) by Sir Gallahad III — sent to England as a yearling where he was that country's Two Year Old Champion. At age five in the United States he won the Yonkers and Butler Memorial Handicaps.

Foxbrough was not successful as a sire.

Following a story by Ed Danforth, sports Editor of the Atlanta Journal, about his visit to Claiborne Farm and the gravesite of Marguerite, the Daily Racing Form commented that Arthur Hancock's saying that he was saving a space next to her for Sir Gallahad III was "one of the most romantic stories in the annals of the world's turf".

== The Marguerite Stakes ==
In 1942 the Maryland Jockey Club announced there would be a new race to be inaugurated in 1945 for two-year-old fillies that would be named in honor of Marguerite. The race was created as a companion event to the Pimlico Futurity and declared to be one of the richest of its kind in the United States.

The final running of the Marguerite Stakes took place on November 27, 1965, and was won by Harbor View Farm's Swift Lady.

== Pedigree ==
Pedigree of Marguerite, chestnut mare, 1920
Sire Celt	Commando	Domino	Himyar
Sire Celt	Commando	Domino	Mannie Gray
Sire Celt	Commando	Emma C.	Darebin
Sire Celt	Commando	Emma C.	Guenn
Sire Celt	Maid of Erin	Amphion	Rosebery
Sire Celt	Maid of Erin	Amphion	Suicide
Sire Celt	Maid of Erin	Mavourneen	Barcaldine
Sire Celt	Maid of Erin	Mavourneen	Gaydene
Dam Fairy Ray	Radium	Bend Or	Doncaster
Dam Fairy Ray	Radium	Bend Or	Rouge Rose
Dam Fairy Ray	Radium	Taia	Donovan
Dam Fairy Ray	Radium	Taia	Eira
Dam Fairy Ray	Seraph	St. Frusquin	St. Simon
Dam Fairy Ray	Seraph	St. Frusquin	Isabel
Dam Fairy Ray	Seraph	St. Marina	Janissary
Dam Fairy Ray	Seraph	St. Marina	St. Marguerite (family: 4-n)
