= Bowie Race Track =

Horse racing track in Bowie, Maryland, US

Coordinates: 39°00′20″N 76°44′21″W

- Interactive map of Bowie Race Track
- Location: Bowie, Maryland, United States
- Owned by: Southern Maryland Agricultural Society
- Date opened: October 1, 1914 (111 years ago)
- Date closed: July 14, 1985
- Course type: Flat, Thoroughbred racing

Bowie Race Track was an American horse racing track located just outside the city limits of Bowie, Maryland. It operated from 1914 through 1985. The facility is now a training center for Thoroughbred racehorses.

== History ==
The one-mile oval racetrack, known as Prince George's Park, was opened October 1, 1914, under the auspices of the Southern Maryland Agricultural Society—in actuality, the track's owners were famous Baltimore confidence men Gad Brian and Jim O'Hara. A major attraction in the area, easy access for racetrack patrons was available from the WB&A Railroad which ran trains every five minutes from the Liberty Street Station in Baltimore for which they charged 65¢ for a round-trip ticket. Admission to the grounds and grandstand was $1.00.

The track was a natural addition to the area, home to the Belair Stud Farm, founded by Samuel Ogle and credited as the "Cradle of American thoroughbred racing."

In 1939, Bowie Race Track began hosting the annual Bowie Handicap, which had previously been run at Pimlico Race Course from 1909 through 1938.

The Bowie-hosted edition was run at one mile and seventy yards, while the Pimlico edition had been run at distances from 1 1/4 miles to two miles.

Following America's involvement in World War II, the racetrack was closed from 1943 into 1945.

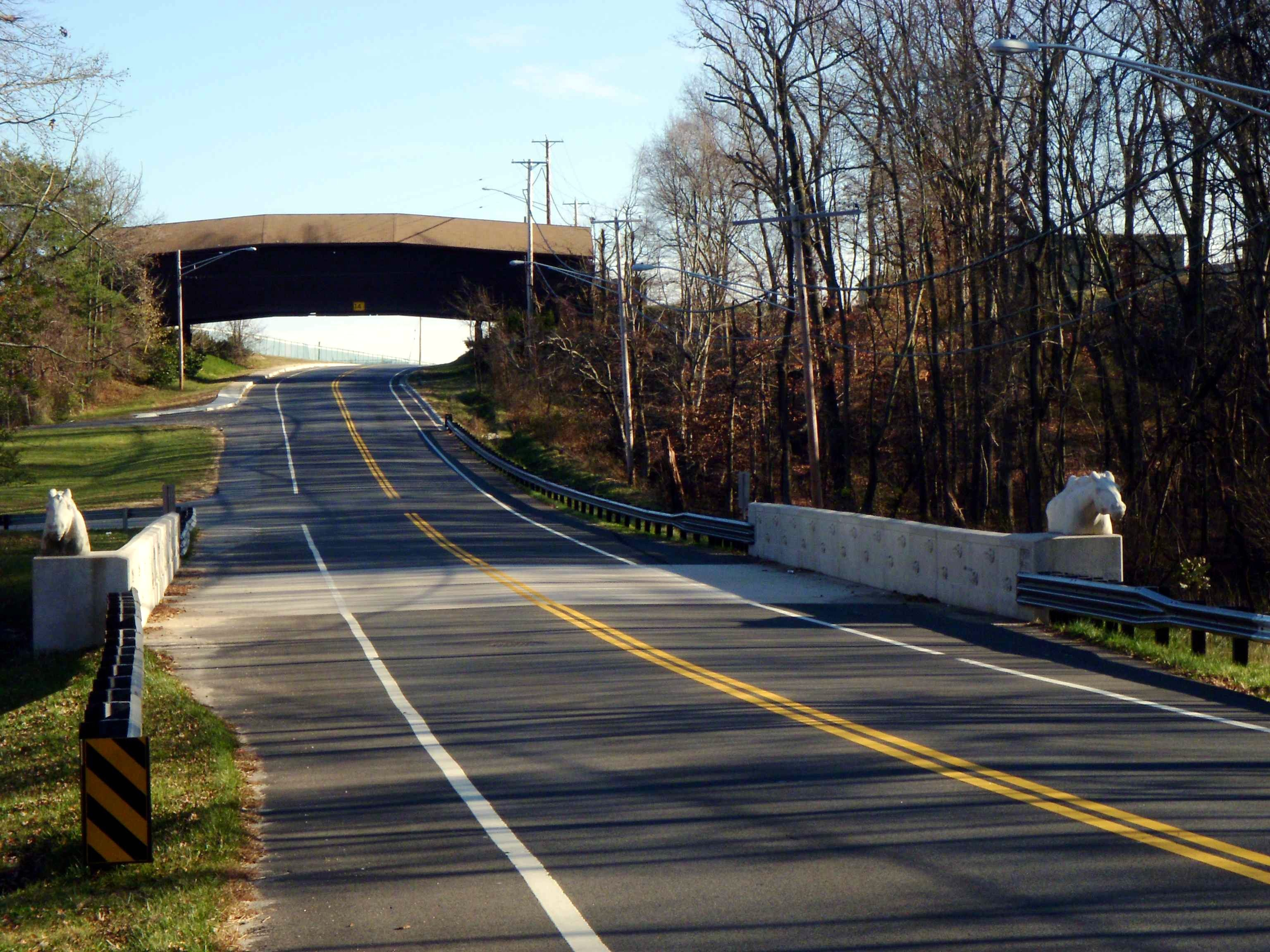
Covered bridge for horses at Bowie

In the 1950s, Bowie Race Track was a pioneer of winter racing. Some of the races inaugurated at the Bowie track include:

- Barbara Fritchie Handicap
- Caesar's Wish Stakes
- Endurance Handicap
- Governor Bowie Handicap
- John B. Campbell Memorial Handicap
- Maryland Governor's Gold Cup
- Native Dancer Stakes
- Rowe Memorial Handicap

On March 9, 1955, officials discovered a cabin cruiser floating on the track's infield lake. No one knew how it got there.

During the night of January 31, 1966, a fire burned down five barns at the track that took the lives of at least 43 horses.

Competition from new racing operations such as Keystone Race Track (later known as Philadelphia Park and then Parx Racing) in Bensalem, Pennsylvania, ultimately led to the demise of the Bowie Race Track which ceased racing operations on July 14, 1985.

The track now serves as a training center for Thoroughbred racehorses. The track and training facility is now owned by MI Developments Inc. (MID).
