= Woodstock Stakes =

- Class: Ungraded Stakes
- Location: Woodbine Racetrack; Toronto, Ontario, Canada
- Inaugurated: 1885
- Race type: Thoroughbred - Flat racing
- Website: www.woodbineentertainment.com/qct/default.asp

Race information
- Distance: 6 furlongs
- Surface: Tapeta
- Track: left-handed
- Qualification: Three-Year-Olds
- Weight: Scale Weight
- Purse: $97,488 (2016)

The Woodstock Stakes is a historic Canadian Thoroughbred horse race run annually at Woodbine Racetrack in Toronto, Ontario since 1885. Held in mid April, the sprint race is open to three-year-old horses and is contested over a distance of 5 1/2 furlongs on Polytrack synthetic dirt. It currently offers a purse of $97,488.

Inaugurated in 1885 at the now defunct Old Woodbine Race Course in Toronto, over the years the Woodstock Stakes has been contested at a variety of distances:

- 1 1/8 miles : 1885–1917 at Old Woodbine Race Course
- 1 1/16 miles : 1920–1932 at Old Woodbine Race Course
- 1 mile 70 yards : 1939–1941 at Old Woodbine Race Course
- 7 furlongs : 1976 at Greenwood Raceway
- 6 1/2 furlongs : 1967–1975 and 1977–1993 at Fort Erie Racetrack, 1994–1997 at Greenwood Raceway
- 6 furlongs : 1948–1955 at Old Woodbine Race Course, 1956–1966 and 1998–present at Woodbine Racetrack

== Records ==
Speed record: (Through 1998, Woodbine times were recorded in fifths of a second. Since 1999 they are in hundredths of a second)

- 1:08.22 - Town Prize (2012) (at current distance of 6 furlongs)

Most wins by an owner:

- 3 - Joseph E. Seagram (1895, 1896, 1907)
- 3 - Sam-Son Farm (1973, 1974, 1986)
- 3 - Kinghaven Farms (1981, 1988, 1991)

Most wins by a jockey:

- 4 - David Clark (1979, 1980, 2000, 2005)

Most wins by a trainer:

- 3 - Arthur H. Warner (1968, 1973, 1974)
- 3 - Roger Attfield (1988, 1991, 1993)

== Winners of the Woodstock Stakes since 1989 ==
Year	Winner	Jockey	Trainer	Owner	Time
2016	Noholdingback Bear	Eurico Rosa Da Silva	Michael P. De Paulo	Bear Stables (Danny Dion)	1:10.22
2015	Serious Talk	Emma-Jayne Wilson	Michael Maker	Michael M. Hui	1:09.52
2014	Puntrooski	Jesse Campbell	Nicholas Gonzalez	Tucci Stables	1:09.31
2013	Dan the Tin Man	Patrick Husbands	Ricky Griffith	Debmar Stables	1:10.21
2012	Town Prize	Eurico Rosa Da Silva	Darwin Banach	William Sorokolit	1:08.22
2011	Oh Canada	Luis Contreras	Robert P. Tiller	Frank DiGiulio Jr.	1:10.10
2010	Essence Hit Man	Chantal Sutherland	Audre Cappuccitti	Audre and Gordon Cappuccitti	1:08.66
2009	Bearcatt	Emma-Jayne Wilson	Reade Baker	Bear Stables (Danny Dion)	1:09.32
2008	Rumbling Cloud	Emma-Jayne Wilson	Sid C. Attard	Veronica Attard	1:11.46
2007	Like Mom Like Sons	Patrick Husbands	Sid C. Attard	Norseman Racing Stable	1:09.68
2006	Atlas Shrugs	Corey Fraser	Reade Baker	J. Pepper & C. Roberts	1:11.65
2005	Wholelottabourbon	David Clark	Nicholas Gonzalez	M.A.D. Racing/Martha Gonzalez	1:12.89
2004	Nyuk Nyuk Nyuk	Dino Luciani	Robert P. Tiller	Tucci Stables	1:09.64
2003	Wando	Todd Kabel	Mike Keogh	Gus Schickedanz	1:10.67
2002	Wild Whiskey	Ray Sabourin	John A. Ross	G. Wellwood & L. Titchner	1:10.62
2001	Lunar Secret	Jeff Burningham	Brian Corbett	Brian Corbett	1:11.40
2000	Wake At Noon	David Clark	Abraham Katryan	Bruno Schickedanz	1:09.24
1999	Hit The Road Beau	James McAleney	Charlene Smith	Patrcia Martin	1:10.38
1998	Albrannon	Todd Kabel	Mike Doyle	Windhaven	1:10.60
1997	Air Cool	Robin Platts	Thomas Bowden	Colebrook Farms	1:17.00
1996	Courty Candor	Emile Ramsammy	Laurie Silvera	Silverbrook Stable	1:17.80
1995	Tethra	Dave Penna	Josie Carroll	Eaton Hall Farm	1:16.20
1994	Housebound	Robert Landry	Macdonald Benson	Windfields Farm	1:16.80
1993	Bold Anthony	James McAleney	Roger Attfield	Pedigree Farm	1:19.80
1992	San Romano	Don Seymour	Phil England	Knob Hill Stable	1:18.80
1991	Bolulight	Don Seymour	Roger Attfield	Kinghaven Farms	1:18.40
1990	D'Parrot	Todd Kabel	Laurie Silvera	Silverbrook Stable	1:18.20
1989	Charlie Barley	Robin Platts	Grant Pearce	King Caledon Farm	1:18.00

== Earlier winners ==
- 1988 - Sweeping Change
- 1987 - Bold Revenue
- 1986 - Color Me Smart
- 1985 - Quick Raise
- 1984 - John Bright
- 1983 - Parfaitement
- 1982 - Ariva
- 1981 - Bude
- 1980 - My Only Love
- 1979 - Ocala Noir
- 1978 - Buck Mountain
- 1977 - Regal Sir
- 1976 - Salim Alicum
- 1975 - Big Destiny
- 1974 - Runnin Roman
- 1973 - Don't Ask Me That
- 1972 - Jewel Prince
- 1971 - Coco la Terreur
- 1970 - Kamakura
- 1969 - Sailor Conn
- 1968 - Big Blunder
- 1967 - Pine Point
- 1966 - Stevie B. Good
- 1965 - Whistling Sea
- 1964 - Royal Tara
- 1963 - Shy Bride
- 1962 - Roman Anna
- 1962 - Monarch Park
- 1961 - Three M. R.
- 1961 - Kickimoon
- 1960 - Hidden Treasure
- 1959 - Wonder Where
- 1958 - Silver Ship
- 1957 - Lyford Cay
- 1956 - Orchestra
- 1955 - Little Wolf
- 1954 - Omyboy
- 1953 - Please Pat
- 1952 - Tiny Terry
- 1951 - no race
- 1950 - Everness
- 1949 - Elmwood Paid
- 1948 - Pet Shadow
- 1942–1947 : no race
- 1941 - Grano Saltis
- 1940 - Second Helping
- 1939 - Sir Marlboro
- 1933–1938 : no race
- 1932 - Springsteel
- 1931 - Rideaway
- 1930 - Gold Brook
- 1929 - Brown Wizard
- 1928 - Solace
- 1927 - Roi des Montagnes
- 1926 - Punjab
- 1925 - Jude Fuller
- 1924 - Digit
- 1923 - Eulalia
- 1922 - Star Jester
- 1921 - Star Voter
- 1920 - Master Bill
- 1918–1919 : no race
- 1917 - Fruit Cake
- 1916 - Damrosch
- 1915 - Commonada
- 1914 - David Craig
- 1913 - Kleburne
- 1912 - Light O'M' Life
- 1911 - Zeus
- 1910 - Banives
- 1909 - Guy Fisher
- 1908 - Montclair
- 1907 - Main Chance
- 1906 - Ruth W.
- 1905 - Tongorder
- 1904 - Fort Hunter
- 1903 - Claude
- 1902 - Red Robe
- 1901 - Sannazarro
- 1900 - Advance Guard
- 1899 - Gold Car
- 1898 - Nabob
- 1897 - Boanerges
- 1896 - Eulalon
- 1895 - Silk Gown
- 1894 - Blue Garter
- 1893 - Coquette
- 1892 - Lady Superior
- 1891 - Addie B.
- 1890 - Periwinkle
- 1889 - Blesdoe
- 1888 - Banjo
- 1887 - Lady Dayrell
- 1886 - Shamrock
- 1885 - Curtolima
- In 1957 Pink Velvet finished first but was disqualified and set back to second.
- In 1961 there was a dead heat for first.
