= Omaha (horse) =

American-bred Thoroughbred racehorse

- Omaha in 1935
- Sire: Gallant Fox
- Grandsire: Sir Gallahad III
- Dam: Flambino
- Damsire: Wrack
- Sex: Stallion
- Foaled: March 24, 1932; Paris, Kentucky, U.S.
- Country: United States
- Colour: Chestnut
- Breeder: Claiborne Farm
- Owner: Belair Stud
- Trainer: James E. Fitzsimmons
- Record: 22:9-7-2
- Earnings: $154,755

Major wins
- Arlington Classic (1935); Dwyer Stakes (1935) Triple Crown race wins: Kentucky Derby (1935); Preakness Stakes (1935); Belmont Stakes (1935)

Awards
- 3rd U.S. Triple Crown Champion (1935); U.S. Champion 3-Year-Old Male Horse (1935)

Honours
- U.S. Racing Hall of Fame (1965) #61 - Top 100 U.S. Racehorses of the 20th Century
- Last updated on September 15th, 2006

Omaha (March 24, 1932 – April 24, 1959) was a champion American Thoroughbred racehorse who is the third winner of the American Triple Crown.

In a racing career which lasted from 1934 to 1936, Omaha won 9 of his 22 races. He had his greatest success as a three-year-old in 1935 when he swept the Triple Crown. As a four-year-old, he narrowly lost the Ascot Gold Cup.

== Background ==
Foaled at Claiborne Farm in Paris, Kentucky, Omaha was a chestnut horse with a white blaze who stood 16.3 hands high. He was the son of 1930 U.S. Triple Crown winner Gallant Fox and the mare Flambino. Omaha was the third horse to ever win the Triple Crown, which he did in 1935. Flambino also produced the Ascot Gold Cup winner Flares and was the sister of La France, the direct female ancestor of many notable thoroughbreds including Danzig Connection, Decidedly, and Johnstown.

The horse was owned by and bred William Woodward Sr.'s famous Belair Stud in Bowie, Maryland. He was trained by Sunny Jim Fitzsimmons, who also trained Omaha's sire to the Triple Crown. As a yearling, Omaha was leggy and awkward-looking but a favorite of Woodward, who reportedly considered sending the horse to England to be trained for the Epsom Derby. In the event, Omaha's move to England was postponed until 1936. He was ridden to his biggest wins by Canadian jockey Smokey Saunders.

== Racing career ==
=== 1934: two-year-old season ===
In his two-year-old season, Omaha finished second in a maiden race on June 18, 1934, and then won a similar event five days later. He failed to win in his remaining seven starts that year, although he ran well in several important races. He finished fourth to Balladier in the United States Hotel Stakes and fourth behind Boxthorn in the Saratoga Special Stakes. On August 22, Omaha finished second to Psychic Bid in the Sanford Stakes and was later third to the same horse in the Hopeful Stakes.

In the Champagne Stakes on September 6, Omaha finished second by a neck to Balladier, who set a track record of 1:16.6 for the six and a half furlong race. Ten days later, Omaha contested the season's most valuable race, the Futurity at Belmont Park, in which he ran fourth behind Chance Sun. On his final appearance of the season, he finished second in the Junior Champion Stakes over one mile, beaten a nose by Sailor Beware in a race-record time of 1:36.6.

=== 1935: three-year-old season ===
Omaha began his three-year-old season by winning an allowance race at Aqueduct Race Track. In the Wood Memorial Stakes, he ran third to Today and Plat Eye after finishing "like a runaway train".

Omaha started second favorite for the Kentucky Derby, with his supporters including Damon Runyon, who tipped the colt despite describing him as "a big, leggy, green thing that seems to invariably get into a lot of trouble". Despite cold weather and heavy rain, the race attracted a crowd of 50,000 to Churchill Downs, and the filly Nellie Flag was made favorite. Saunders kept Omaha clear of early trouble before moving the colt into the lead in the backstretch. Omaha was never seriously challenged and won by a length and a half from Roman Soldier without Saunders ever using his whip. Whiskolo finished third ahead of Nellie Flag and Blackbirder.

A week after his Derby win, Omaha was made odds-on favorite for the Preakness Stakes in front of a record crowd of 40,000 at Pimlico Race Course. He caught the front-running Brannon on the turn out of the backstretch and drew clear to win by six lengths from Firethorn, with Psychic Bid a further six lengths back in third. Omaha refused to stand still for the post-race ceremonies, meaning that Saunders had to collect the presentational rose wreath "on the fly".

The colt was brought back in distance for the Withers Stakes over one mile on May 27. He was made 1/2 favorite, but despite finishing strongly he failed to catch Rosemont and was beaten by one and a half lengths. In the Belmont Stakes over one and a half miles on June 8, Omaha started 7/10 favorite over Rosemont and Firethorn. Racing on a sloppy track, he was towards the rear in the early stages and entered the stretch covered in mud. He then produced "one of his famous stretch drives" to win by a length and a half from Firethorn, with a further eight lengths back to Rosemont in third.

Two weeks after his Belmont Stakes win, Omaha took on older horses for the first time in the Brooklyn Handicap. He was no match for the four-year-old Discovery, who won by six lengths from King Saxon in record time of 1:48.2 for nine furlongs. Omaha was a further four lengths back in third. A week later, he returned to his own age group for the Dwyer Stakes. Ridden by Wayne Wright, he defeated the CCA Oaks winner Good Gamble by one and a half lengths. On July 21, Omaha started 2/5 favorite for the Arlington Classic in front of a crowd of 40,000 in Chicago. He took his winnings for the season to $142,225 by winning in track record time from St Bernard, Bloodroot, and Black Helen. He was reported to be lame in August and missed the rest of the season, although the exact nature of his injury was never fully explained.

There were no formal "Horse of the Year" awards in 1935, but Omaha was recognised as the champion three-year-old colt in the United States. Discovery, however, was regarded as the year's outstanding horse.

=== 1936: four-year-old season ===
In January 1936, Omaha was moved to Aqueduct racecourse, where he was exercised under the supervision of British trainer Cecil Boyd-Rochfort. He was then loaded aboard the RMS Aquitania and shipped to England to enter Boyd-Rochfort's Newmarket stable. His principal objective was the Ascot Gold Cup, which no American horse had won since Foxhall's triumph in 1882.

On May 9, he made his British debut in the Victor Wild Stakes over one and a half miles at Kempton Park Racecourse, where he was ridden by his new jockey, Pat Beasley. Racing on turf and on a right-handed track for the first time, Omaha accelerated past his opponents half a mile from the finish and won "impressively" by one and a half lengths from Montrose. Four weeks later, he returned to the same course for the Queen's Plate over two miles. He took the lead in the straight and won from Lord Derby's colt Bobsleigh in what was described as a "thrilling" finish.

At Royal Ascot on June 18, Omaha contested the two and a half mile Ascot Gold Cup. He started favorite at odds of 11/8 against eight opponents, with his biggest danger appearing to be Quashed, a non-Thoroughbred filly who had won The Oaks in 1935. Before the race, which attracted a crowd estimated at 150,000, Omaha appeared agitated and almost unseated Beasley on several occasions. He was restrained by Beasley in the early stages before moving up to challenge Quashed for the lead just before the right-hand turn into the straight. The filly and the colt raced together throughout the closing stages, drawing well clear of the remaining runners. A furlong from the finish, Omaha drew level and looked the likely winner, but Quashed rallied in the final strides and was awarded the victory by a short head. Many years later, the 1936 Gold Cup was described by The Observer as the greatest race of all time. In his only subsequent race in England, Omaha ran second by a neck to Taj Akbar in the one and a half mile Princess of Wales's Stakes at Newmarket Racecourse in July. In this race, Omaha carried 138 pounds, eighteen pounds more than the winner, a three-year-old who had finished second to Mahmoud in The Derby.

Omaha remained in training with Boyd-Rochfort and was aimed at the 1937 Ascot Gold Cup. He was found to be lame shortly before the race and never ran again.

== Race record ==
Lifetime: 22-9-7-2 Career earnings: $154,755
Date	Track	Race	Distance (Furlongs)	Finish Position	Chart	Notes
6-18-1934	Aqueduct	Maiden Special	5	2	"Closed fast"	
6-23-1934	Aqueduct	Allowance	5	1	"Bore in"	
8-4-1934	Saratoga	US Hotel Stakes	6	4	"Late speed"	
8-11-1934	Saratoga	Saratoga Special	6	4	"Late speed"	
8-22-1934	Saratoga	Sanford Stakes	6	2	"Game rush"	
9-1-1934	Saratoga	Hopeful Stakes	6 1/2	4	"Closed gap"	
9-6-1934	Belmont Park	Champagne Stakes	6 1/2	2	"Gaining"	Widener Chute
9-15-1934	Belmont Park	Futurity Stakes	6 1/2	4	"Closed fast"	Widener Chute Track: Muddy
9-29-1934	Aqueduct	Junior Championship	8	2	"Game rush"	
4-22-1935	Jamaica Race Course	Allowance	8 and 70 yards	1	"Easily best"	
4-27-1935	Jamaica Race Course	Wood Memorial	8 and 70 yards	3	"Closed fast"	
5-4-1935	Churchill Downs	Kentucky Derby	10	1	"Easily"	Track: Good
5-11-1935	Pimlico	Preakness Stakes	9 1/2	1	"Easily"	
5-25-1935	Belmont Park	Withers Stakes	8	2	"Closed well"	
6-8-1935	Belmont Park	Belmont Stakes	12	1	"Easily"	Track: Sloppy Third to win the Triple Crown
6-22-1935	Aqueduct	Brooklyn Handicap	9	3	"Evenly"	
6-29-1935	Aqueduct	Dwyer Stakes	9	1	"Easily"	
7-20-1935	Arlington Park	Classic	10	1	"Wide"	
5-9-1936	Kempton	Victor Wild Stakes (Allowance)	12	1	"Previously trained by James Fitzsimmons"	New trainer: Cecil Boyd-Rochfort Track: Turf, good
5-30-1936	Kempton	Queen's Plate	16	1	"Tracked very slow pace, dueled 1f out, prevailed"	Track: Turf, firm
6-18-1936	Ascot	Ascot Gold Cup	20	2	"rated in 4th, bid over 1f out, dueled, just failed"	Winner, Quashed, not a registered thoroughbred Track: Turf, soft
7-2-1936	Newmarket	Princess of Wales's Stakes	12	2	"unruly pre-start, tracked in 3rd, led 3f out, came again"	Carried 14lbs more than winner Track: Turf, good

== Stud career ==
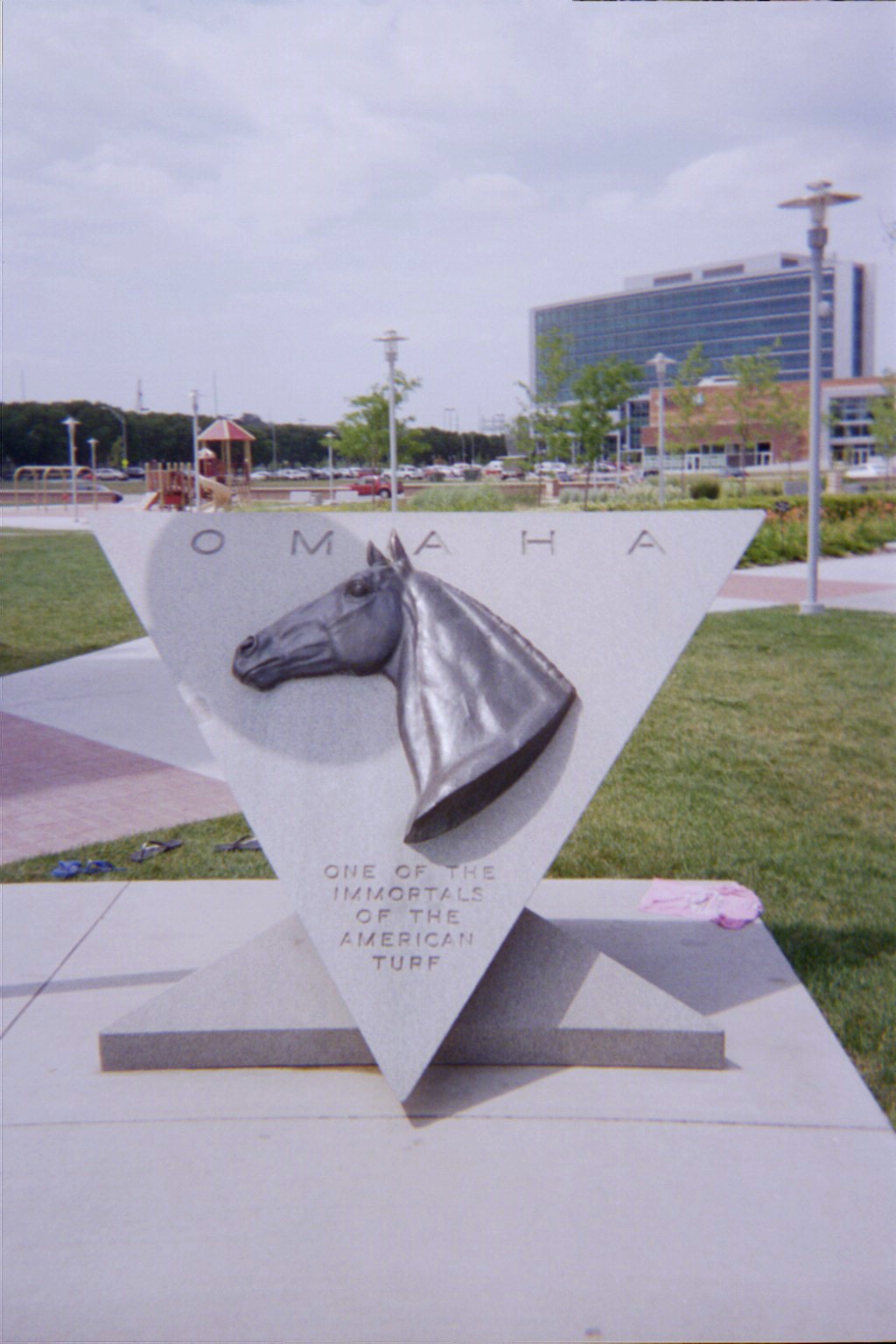
Memorial to Omaha in Stinson Park at Aksarben Village in Omaha, Nebraska

Retired to stand at stud at Claiborne Farm, he failed to perform satisfactorily and in 1943 was turned over to the Jockey Club's Breeding Bureau, which sent him north to a stud farm in New York State where he remained for seven years. He was then moved west in 1950 to Nebraska, where he lived out the last nine years of his life on a farm near Nebraska City, about 45 miles (72 km) south of the city of Omaha. During the 1950s, the Triple Crown winner was taken to the Ak-Sar-Ben racetrack in Omaha, where he appeared in the winner's circle.

When Omaha died in 1959 at the age of 27, he was buried at the Ak-Sar-Ben Racetrack.

Omaha was not considered a successful sire with the best of his progeny being the Bing Crosby Handicap winner Prevaricator and the Louisiana Handicap winner South Dakota. His more remote descendants included Nijinsky II and three Kentucky Derby winners.

In 1965, he was inducted into the National Museum of Racing and Hall of Fame. In The Blood-Horse ranking of the top 100 thoroughbred champions of the 20th Century, Omaha was ranked #61.

== Pedigree ==
Pedigree of Omaha (USA), chestnut stallion 1932
Sire Gallant Fox	Sir Gallahad	Teddy	Ajax
Sire Gallant Fox	Sir Gallahad	Teddy	Rondeau
Sire Gallant Fox	Sir Gallahad	Plucky Liege	Spearmint
Sire Gallant Fox	Sir Gallahad	Plucky Liege	Concertina
Sire Gallant Fox	Marguerite	Celt	Commando
Sire Gallant Fox	Marguerite	Celt	Maid of Erin
Sire Gallant Fox	Marguerite	Fairy Ray	Radium
Sire Gallant Fox	Marguerite	Fairy Ray	Seraph
Dam Flambino	Wrack	Robert Le Diable	Ayrshire
Dam Flambino	Wrack	Robert Le Diable	Rose Bay
Dam Flambino	Wrack	Samphire	Isinglass
Dam Flambino	Wrack	Samphire	Chelandry
Dam Flambino	Flambette	Durbar	Rabelais
Dam Flambino	Flambette	Durbar	Armenia
Dam Flambino	Flambette	La Flambee	Ajax
Dam Flambino	Flambette	La Flambee	Medeah (Family 17-b)
