= Damrosch (horse) =

American-bred Thoroughbred racehorse

- Sire: Rock Sand
- Grandsire: Sainfoin
- Dam: Dissembler
- Damsire: Hanover
- Sex: Stallion
- Foaled: 1913
- Country: United States
- Colour: Brown/Bay
- Breeder: August Belmont, Jr.
- Owner: J. K. L. Ross
- Trainer: W. Fred Presgrave; Albert G. Weston

Major wins
- Woodstock Stakes (1916); Hyde Park Selling Handicap; Woodstock Plate Handicap; Willet Handicap (1918); Garden City Selling Stakes Triple Crown Race wins: Preakness Stakes (1916)

Damrosch (foaled in 1913) was an American Thoroughbred racehorse best known for winning the 1916 Preakness Stakes.

== Background ==
Bred by August Belmont, Jr. at his Nursery Stud near Lexington, Kentucky, he was sired by the 1903 English Triple Crown winner, Rock Sand. Damrosch was out of the mare Dissembler, a daughter of the four-time Leading sire in North America, Hanover.

== Racing career ==
Captain W. Fred Presgrave of Kentucky, who had trained the winner of the 1904 Preakness Stakes winner, Bryn Mawr, purchased Damrosch from August Belmont, Jr. on behalf of Canadian businessman J. K. L. Ross. Presgrave trained the colt part way into his three-year-old campaign when Albert Weston took over his conditioning. In the Preakness Stakes, the colt was ridden to victory by Linus McAtee and led from the start to win from Greenwood.

== Stud record ==
Damrosch raced through age seven and was then retired to stud. He was not successful as a sire.

== Pedigree ==
Pedigree of Damrosch (USA), brown stallion, 1913
Sire Rock Sand (GB) 1900	Sainfoin; 1887	Springfield	St.Albans
Sire Rock Sand (GB) 1900	Sainfoin; 1887	Springfield	Viridis
Sire Rock Sand (GB) 1900	Sainfoin; 1887	Sanda	Wenlock
Sire Rock Sand (GB) 1900	Sainfoin; 1887	Sanda	Sandal
Sire Rock Sand (GB) 1900	Roquebrune; 1893	St. Simon	Galopin
Sire Rock Sand (GB) 1900	Roquebrune; 1893	St. Simon	St.Angela
Sire Rock Sand (GB) 1900	Roquebrune; 1893	St.Marguerite	Hermit
Sire Rock Sand (GB) 1900	Roquebrune; 1893	St.Marguerite	Devotion
Dam Disembler (USA) 1895	Hanover; 1884	Hindoo	Virgil
Dam Disembler (USA) 1895	Hanover; 1884	Hindoo	Florence
Dam Disembler (USA) 1895	Hanover; 1884	Bourbon Belle	Bonnie Scotland (GB)
Dam Disembler (USA) 1895	Hanover; 1884	Bourbon Belle	Ella D
Dam Disembler (USA) 1895	Hypocrite; 1885	Longfellow	Leamington (GB)
Dam Disembler (USA) 1895	Hypocrite; 1885	Longfellow	Nantura
Dam Disembler (USA) 1895	Hypocrite; 1885	Hypatia	Waverly
Dam Disembler (USA) 1895	Hypocrite; 1885	Hypatia	sister to Ruric (Family: 12-b)
