= Jefferson Davis Cohn =

British American publisher, horse breeder

- Born: 1881; London
- Died: 1951 (aged 69–70); Manhattan, New York
- Spouse: Marcelle Chantal (m. 1921)

Jefferson Davis Cohn (1880–1951) was a British American publisher, member of the London Stock Exchange, and horse breeder. Born in London on 15 February 1880, he was the son of Herrmann Cohn (c.1842-1917) and Anita nee Davis. Anita was the daughter of Maurice Davis M.D. of Brunswick Square, London. Jefferson Davis Cohn was frequently referred to as being the godson of Jefferson Davis.

He became an unauthorised clerk in the London stock-broking firm of Messrs. Abrahams, Jonas and Co. around 1897, progressed to become a member of the London Stock Exchange on 10 March 1902, and by 1905 was a partner in the Abrahams, Jonas and Co. firm.

By late 1905 he was also working as private secretary to the very wealthy British merchant banker Herbert Stern (1851-1919), and he acted as intermediary for Stern to buy the manor of Michelham Park Gate from Horatio Bottomley on 19 December 1905. That paved the way for Stern to adopt the title "Baron Michelham of Hellingley" when he was raised to the peerage on 28 December 1905.

In 1914, he bought the racehorse Teddy from Edmond Blanc for 5,400 francs. In 1924 his horse "Sir Gallahad III" won the Lincolnshire Handicap. Cohn also owned Haras du Bois-Roussel, a breeding farm in Alençon, which he sold to Léon Volterra.

In 1911, he bought the steam yacht "Alberta" (483 tons net, 1159 tons gross), which had been formerly owned by the King of the Belgians.

His first marriage was on 2 December 1903 to Florence, the only child of the Member of Parliament, financier and swindler Horatio Bottomley. His second marriage was in 1921, to Marcelle Chantal. His third marriage was in February 1943, in Arlington Virginia, to Helen Gleason.
