= Endurance Gold Cup Stakes =

- Class: Discontinued stakes
- Location: Bowie Race Track; Bowie, Maryland, United States
- Inaugurated: 1921
- Race type: Thoroughbred - Flat racing

Race information
- Distance: 1 1/16 miles (8.5 furlongs)
- Surface: Dirt
- Track: left-handed
- Qualification: Two-year-olds
- Weight: Assigned

The Endurance Gold Cup Stakes was an American Thoroughbred horse race run annually during the latter part of November at Bowie Race Track in Bowie, Maryland. Open to two-year-old horses, it was contested on dirt over a distance of a mile and a sixteenth (8.5 furlongs).

Inaugurated as the Endurance Handicap at a distance of one mile, seventy yards, its name was changed in 1952 by new track President, Larry MacPhail.

== Winners (partial list) ==
- 1954 - Saratoga
- 1953 - Permian
- 1952 - no race
- 1951 - Jampol
- 1951 - Orco †
- 1950 - Bob Considine
- 1949 - Greek Song
- 1948 - Palestinian
- 1947 - Hefty
- 1946 - Golden Bull
- 1945 - Lord Boswell
- 1944 - The Doge
- 1944 - Hail Victory †
- 1943 - no race
- 1942 - Chop Chop
- 1941 - Sweet Swinger
- 1940 - Magnificent
- 1939 - Fenelon
- 1938 - no race
- 1937 - Legal Light
- 1936 - Betty's Buddy
- 1935 - Bright Plumage
- 1934 - Commonwealth
- 1933 - Chicstraw
- 1932 - Projectile
- 1931 - Mad Frump
- 1930 - Sweep All
- 1929 - Snowflake
- 1928 - Soul of Honor
- 1927 - Sortie
- 1926 - Dolan
- 1925 - High Star
- 1924 - Sumpter
- 1923 - Tree Top
- 1922 - Oui Oui
- 1921 - Champlain

† - Second division
