= Flares (horse) =

American-bred Thoroughbred racehorse

- Sire: Gallant Fox
- Grandsire: Sir Gallahad III
- Dam: Flambino
- Damsire: Wrack
- Sex: Stallion
- Foaled: 1933
- Country: United States
- Colour: Bay
- Breeder: Belair Stud
- Owner: William Woodward Sr.
- Trainer: Cecil Boyd-Rochfort
- Record: 20: 8-?-?
- Earnings: £18,506

Major wins
- Newmarket Stakes (1936); Champion Stakes (1937); Lowther Stakes (1937); Princess of Wales's Stakes (1937); Ascot Gold Cup (1938)

Flares (foaled 1933 in Maryland) was an American-bred, British-trained Thoroughbred racehorse owned, bred, and raced by the preeminent horseman in the United States, William Woodward Sr. Flares was out of the racemare Flambino, winner of the 1927 Gazelle Stakes. His sire was the great Gallant Fox, the 1930 U.S. Triple Crown winner and a U.S. Racing Hall of Fame inductee.

Flares was a full brother to Woodward's 1935 U.S. Triple Crown champion, Omaha. Determined to win England's most prestigious weight-for-age race, the Ascot Gold Cup, in 1936 Woodward sent the then four-year-old Omaha to compete in England, where he ran second in the Ascot Gold Cup.

When Flares was a yearling in 1934, Woodward shipped him to trainer Cecil Boyd-Rochfort at his base in Newmarket, England. Racing at age three, in mid-May 1936 Flares won the Newmarket Stakes. In 1937, he had an outstanding year as a four-year-old. At Newmarket Racecourse, he won the mile and a half Princess of Wales's Stakes, the Champion Stakes at a mile and a quarter, and the Lowther Stakes at a mile and three quarters.

In 1938, Flares was entered in the Ascot Gold Cup and was sent off by bettors as a 100 to 7 longshot. However, he became the first American horse since Foxhall in 1882 to win the prestigious two and a half mile race and gave William Woodward his first-ever victory in the event.

== Stud record ==
Immediately after his Gold Cup win, Flares was brought back to stand at stud in the United States. The October 14, 1938, issue of the Los Angeles Times reported he would stand for a fee of US$1,000.

Flares sired a number of race winners, including:

- Chop Chop (b. 1940) - won Empire City Handicap. Leading sire in Canada five times. Canadian Horse Racing Hall of Fame inductee.
- Skytracer (b. 1941) - winner of the 1944 Blue Grass Stakes, Kentucky Derby runner
- Epigram (b. 1949) - in 1952, he won Canada's most prestigious race, the Queen's Plate.

== Pedigree ==
Pedigree of Flares
Sire Gallant Fox	Sir Gallahad III	Teddy	Ajax
Sire Gallant Fox	Sir Gallahad III	Teddy	Rondeau
Sire Gallant Fox	Sir Gallahad III	Plucky Liege	Spearmint
Sire Gallant Fox	Sir Gallahad III	Plucky Liege	Concertina
Sire Gallant Fox	Marguerite	Celt	Commando
Sire Gallant Fox	Marguerite	Celt	Maid of Erin
Sire Gallant Fox	Marguerite	Fairy Ray	Radium
Sire Gallant Fox	Marguerite	Fairy Ray	Seraph
Dam Flambino	Wrack	Robert Le Diable	Ayrshire
Dam Flambino	Wrack	Robert Le Diable	Rose Bay
Dam Flambino	Wrack	Samphire	Isinglass
Dam Flambino	Wrack	Samphire	Chelandry
Dam Flambino	Flambette	Durbar	Rabelais
Dam Flambino	Flambette	Durbar	Armenia
Dam Flambino	Flambette	La Flambee	Ajax
Dam Flambino	Flambette	La Flambee	Medeah
