= Gallant Fox =

American-bred Thoroughbred racehorse

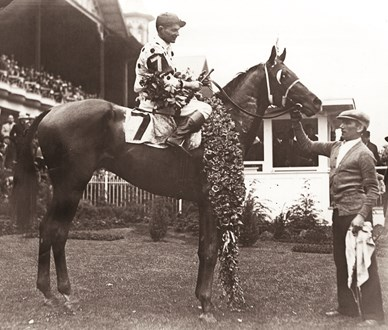
- Gallant Fox at the 1930 Kentucky Derby
- Sire: Sir Gallahad III
- Grandsire: Teddy
- Dam: Marguerite
- Damsire: Celt
- Sex: Stallion
- Foaled: 1927
- Country: United States
- Color: Bay
- Breeder: Belair Stud
- Owner: Belair Stud Stable (Colors: White, Red Dots, Red Cap)
- Trainer: James E. Fitzsimmons
- Record: 17: 11-3-2
- Earnings: $328,165

Major wins
- Flash Stakes (1929); Cowdin Stakes (1929); Wood Memorial Stakes (1930); Jockey Club Gold Cup (1930); Dwyer Stakes (1930); Arlington Classic (1930); Lawrence Realization Stakes (1930); Saratoga Cup (1930); Triple Crown race wins: Kentucky Derby (1930); Preakness Stakes (1930); Belmont Stakes (1930)

Awards
- 2nd U.S. Triple Crown Champion; U.S. Champion 3-Yr-Old Colt (1930); United States Horse of the Year (1930)

Honors
- United States Racing Hall of Fame (1957) #28 - Top 100 U.S. Racehorses of the 20th Century; Gallant Fox Handicap at Aqueduct Racetrack; Gallant Fox Lane in Bowie, Maryland
- Last updated on June 09, 2012

Gallant Fox (March 23, 1927 – November 13, 1954) was a champion American Thoroughbred racehorse who is the second winner of the American Triple Crown.

In a racing career which lasted from 1929 to 1930, Gallant Fox won 11 of his 17 races including the three Triple Crown races. The term "Triple Crown" was not commonly used at the time but was employed by The New York Times to describe the colt's achievements.

== Background ==
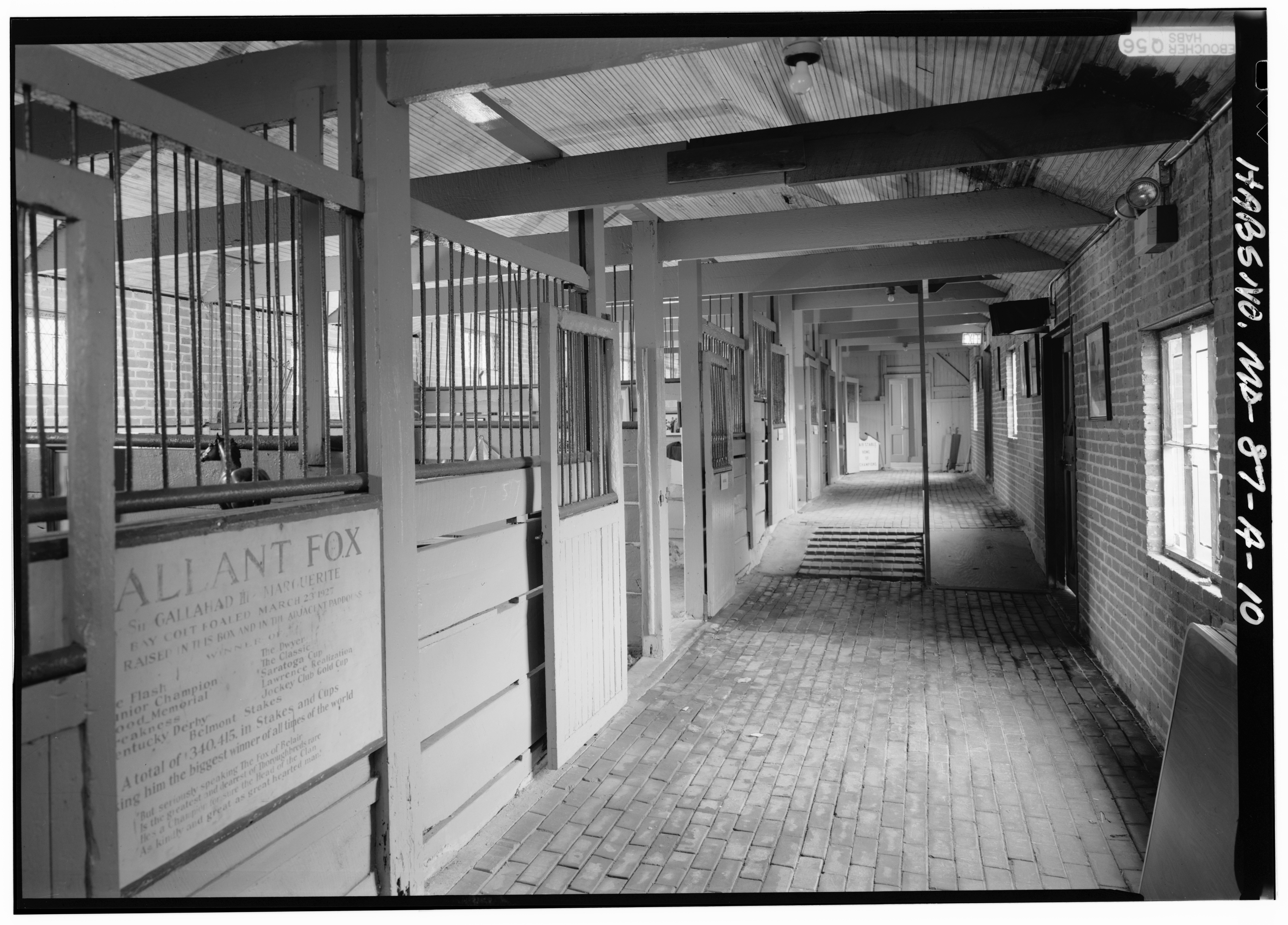
Gallant Fox's stable at the Belair Stables in Bowie, Maryland

Gallant Fox was a bay colt with a white blaze, was foaled at Claiborne Farm in Paris, Kentucky, and was one of many leading American racehorses sired by the French-bred stallion Sir Gallahad III. His dam was the mare Marguerite, who also produced Gallant Fox's full brother Fighting Fox, whose wins included the Grand Union Hotel Stakes, the Wood Memorial Stakes, and the Carter Handicap. Owned by the Belair Stud of Collington, Maryland, Gallant Fox was trained by "Sunny Jim" Fitzsimmons and ridden in his major victories by Earl Sande. Early in his career, Gallant Fox was known for being distracted at times, supposedly being late out of the gate in his maiden race due to an airplane flying overhead. Gallant Fox also would become reluctant to run unless there was at least one other horse accompanying him. To help work him out, Fitzsimmons would have other horses placed around the track ahead of Gallant Fox, so he would chase after them.

== Racing career ==
In 1929, Gallant Fox won twice, taking the Flash Stakes and the Cowdin Stakes, but in his biggest test he finished third to Harry Payne Whitney's Whichone in the Belmont Futurity Stakes.

The colt was regarded as a major contender for 1930's major three-year-old races and confirmed his status with a win in the Wood Memorial Stakes, beating Crack Brigade by four lengths at Jamaica Race Course in April.

In May, Gallant Fox started as the favorite for the Preakness Stakes, that year the first of the "Triple Crown" races. Ridden by Earl Sande, he took the lead early in the straight and held the late challenge of Crack Brigade by three quarters of a length. The win was enthusiastically received with the popular Sande smiling and raising his whip to the crowd. The Kentucky Derby, two weeks later, attracted a crowd of 50,000 despite heavy rain at Louisville, and Gallant Fox started favorite. He broke slowly but took the lead on the backstretch from the filly Alcibiades before winning by two lengths from Gallant Knight, completing the course in 2:07 3/5 on a muddy track. Sande won the race for a record third time, following victories on Zev and Flying Ebony. By this time, Gallant Fox was becoming known as "the red-headed-horse" because of the bright red hood he wore in his races, and was also called "The Fox of Belair" or simply "The Fox." At Belmont Park three weeks later, he won the Belmont Stakes from Whichone, who had missed the Derby but won the Withers Stakes and had been favored to win by many "experts". Before the end of June, Gallant Fox added a win in the Dwyer Stakes at odds of 1/10, although the lack of effective opposition (Whichone missed the race through injury) made the victory a "hollow" one. By July, Gallant Fox was being described as a "super horse" and about 60,000 were in attendance at Arlington Park near Chicago when he won the Arlington Classic by a neck from Gallant Knight with the top weight of 126 pounds.

Gallant Fox and Whichone met again in August in the Travers Stakes at Saratoga, but in a huge upset, they finished second and third to 100/1 outsider Jim Dandy, who appeared ideally suited for the muddy track and won by three lengths. Fitzsimmons blamed the state of the ground for the colt's defeat and claimed that he had only run on the insistence of his owner. In the Lawrence Realization Stakes at Belmont Park in September, Gallant Fox, by then generally acknowledged as the champion of the year, defeated Questionnaire by a nose. His win took his earnings to $317,865, surpassing the world record held since 1923 by Zev. By the end of a season, Gallant Fox had increased his earnings to $328,165, although the record lasted only a year before it was beaten by Sun Beau.

In October, after wins against older horses in the Saratoga Cup and the Jockey Club Gold Cup, it was announced that Gallant Fox would be retired to stud. At the end of the year, he was described as "easily the outstanding Thoroughbred" of 1930. Although at the time there was no organized "Horse of the Year" award, The Blood-Horse retrospective named Gallant Fox as the 1930 American Horse of the Year. The most respected Thoroughbred racing magazine in North America and now owned by The Jockey Club, The Blood-Horse commissioned an exhaustive review covering the period 1887 through 1935 to provide their list of national Champions that is used by the National Museum of Racing and Hall of Fame and Churchill Downs, Inc., among others.

== Race record ==
Lifetime Record: 17-11-3-2 Career Earnings: $328,165L
Date	Track	Race	Distance (Furlongs)	Finish Position	Notes
6-24-1929	Aqueduct	Allowance	5	3	
6-29-1929	Aqueduct	Tremont Stakes	6	8	Track: Good
7-29-1929	Saratoga	Flash Stakes	5 ½	1	
8-3-1929	Saratoga	U. S. Hotel Stakes	6	2	
9-10-1929	Belmont Park	Allowance	6	2	Track: Good Impeded Widener Chute
9-14-1929	Belmont Park	Futurity Stakes	7 (about)	3	Widener Chute
9-28-1929	Aqueduct	Junior Championship Stakes	8	1	
4-26-1930	Jamaica Race Course	Wood Memorial	8 and 70 yards	1	
5-9-1930	Pimlico	Preakness Stakes	9 ½	1	Geldings not eligible Run before KY Derby
5-17-1930	Churchill Downs	Kentucky Derby	10	1	Track: Good
6-7-1930	Belmont Park	Belmont Stakes	12	1	Track: Good Won the newly named Triple Crown
6-28-1930	Aqueduct	Dwyer Stakes	12	1	Track: Good
7-12-1930	Arlington Park	Classic	10	1	
8-16-1930	Saratoga	Travers Stakes	10	2	Track: Heavy Famously lost to Jim Dandy by eight lengths
8-30-1930	Saratoga	Saratoga Cup	14	1	
9-6-1930	Belmont Park	Lawrence Realization	13	1	
9-17-1930	Belmont Park	Jockey Club Gold Cup	16	1	

== Stud career ==
Gallant Fox's grave at Claiborne Farm

Gallant Fox was retired to stud after the 1930 racing season and had a twenty-two year breeding career. Among his progeny were 1935 Triple Crown winner Omaha and Granville, the 1936 Horse of the Year. He also sired Omaha's full brother Flares, who in 1938 became only the second American-bred to ever win England's Ascot Gold Cup.

Gallant Fox was the first US Triple Crown winner to sire a second-generation Triple Crown champion when his son Omaha won the U.S. Triple Crown in 1935. Fifty-eight years later, in 1993, Affirmed became the second when his son, Peteski, won the Canadian Triple Crown.

Gallant Fox died on November 13, 1954, and was buried at Claiborne Farm. His epitaph famously reads, "He swept like a meteor across the racing sky of 1930." In 1957, he was inducted into the National Museum of Racing and Hall of Fame. Blood-Horse magazine's ranking of the top 100 U.S. thoroughbred champions of the 20th Century listed Gallant Fox at #28.

== Pedigree ==
Pedigree of Gallant Fox
Sire Sir Gallahad (FR) 1920	Teddy (FR); 1913	Ajax	Flying Fox
Sire Sir Gallahad (FR) 1920	Teddy (FR); 1913	Ajax	Amie
Sire Sir Gallahad (FR) 1920	Teddy (FR); 1913	Rondeau	Bay Ronald
Sire Sir Gallahad (FR) 1920	Teddy (FR); 1913	Rondeau	Doremi
Sire Sir Gallahad (FR) 1920	Plucky Liege (GB); 1912	Spearmint	Carbine
Sire Sir Gallahad (FR) 1920	Plucky Liege (GB); 1912	Spearmint	Maid of the Mint
Sire Sir Gallahad (FR) 1920	Plucky Liege (GB); 1912	Concertina	St. Simon
Sire Sir Gallahad (FR) 1920	Plucky Liege (GB); 1912	Concertina	Comic Song
Dam Marguerite (USA) 1920	Celt (USA); 1905	Commando	Domino
Dam Marguerite (USA) 1920	Celt (USA); 1905	Commando	Emma C.
Dam Marguerite (USA) 1920	Celt (USA); 1905	Maid of Erin	Amphion
Dam Marguerite (USA) 1920	Celt (USA); 1905	Maid of Erin	Mavourneen
Dam Marguerite (USA) 1920	Fairy Ray (GB); 1911	Radium	Bend Or
Dam Marguerite (USA) 1920	Fairy Ray (GB); 1911	Radium	Taia
Dam Marguerite (USA) 1920	Fairy Ray (GB); 1911	Seraph	St. Frusquin
Dam Marguerite (USA) 1920	Fairy Ray (GB); 1911	Seraph	St. Marina (Family 4-n)
