= Belair Stud =

American Thoroughbred racing and breeding farm

Coordinates: 38°57′58″N 76°44′36″W

- Company type: Horse breeding farm and Thoroughbred racing stable
- Founded: 1747
- Headquarters: Collington, Maryland
- Key people: Samuel Ogle founding owner (1747–1752); James T. Woodward (owner 1898–1910); William Woodward Sr. (owner 1910–1953); William Woodward Jr. owner (1953–1955)

Belair Stud was an American thoroughbred horse racing stable and breeding farm founded by Provincial Governor of Maryland Samuel Ogle in 1747 in Collington, Prince George's County, Maryland, in Colonial America.

== Colonial period ==
Queen Mab and Spark were the first pair of English-bred Thoroughbred horses imported to the Province of Maryland. Frederick Calvert, 6th Baron Baltimore, gave Spark to Ogle during Ogle's trip to England in 1740. The Prince of Wales presented the gift to Ogle. Later, Benjamin Tasker, Jr. brought Selima to Belair, where she became a prominent producer.

== The Woodward Family ==
In 1898 the property was sold to the wealthy New York City banker James T. Woodward, who built large new stables in 1907. On his death, his will bequeathed the property to his nephew William Woodward Sr., who built Belair Stud and Stable into the preeminent United States racing and breeding operation of the 1930s, 1940s, and 1950s.

During World War I, American horsemen were able to purchase well-bred foals from French breeders who could not afford to feed them during the extremely difficult war years. Some were bought directly by breeders, while many were purchased by brokers, who immediately resold them in America at the various thoroughbred auctions. As such, William Woodward Sr. was able to build his broodmare band on French imports.

Under William Woodward Sr., the farm produced some of the greatest thoroughbred racehorses in the United States. He was part of a syndicate of breeders who purchased Sir Gallahad III in France and brought him to America. Two of Woodward's most famous horses were Gallant Fox and Omaha, the only father-and-son horses ever to win the U.S. Triple Crown of Thoroughbred Racing.

== Record ==
In 1752, Selima won the biggest prize of the era, 2,500 pistoles at Gloucester, Virginia, which marked "the beginning of the remarkable racing contests between the rival colonies of Maryland and Virginia."

From 1923 to 1953, Belair Stud horses won 631 races, placed second 568 times, and ran third 540 times. Included in their victories were numerous important stakes races. Five of their horses were voted into the National Museum of Racing and Hall of Fame. Under trainer Sunny Jim Fitzsimmons, the stable won the following prestigious U.S. Triple Crown races:

- Kentucky Derby:
  - 1930 : Gallant Fox
  - 1935 : Omaha
  - 1939 : Johnstown
- Preakness Stakes:
  - 1930 : Gallant Fox
  - 1935 : Omaha
  - 1955 : Nashua
- Belmont Stakes:
  - 1930 : Gallant Fox
  - 1932 : Faireno
  - 1935 : Omaha
  - 1936 : Granville
  - 1939 : Johnstown
  - 1955 : Nashua

== See also ==
- Belair Mansion (Bowie, Maryland)
- Belair Stable Museum (Bowie, Maryland)
