= Triple Crown of Thoroughbred Racing (United States) =

Racing honor

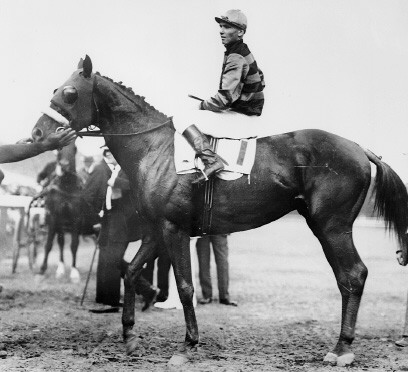
Sir Barton, the first Triple Crown winner, at the 1919 Preakness Stakes

In the United States, the Triple Crown of Thoroughbred Racing, commonly known as the Triple Crown, is a series of horse races for three-year-old Thoroughbreds, consisting of the Kentucky Derby, Preakness Stakes, and Belmont Stakes. The three races were inaugurated in different years, the last being the Kentucky Derby in 1875. The Triple Crown Trophy, commissioned in 1950 but awarded to all previous winners as well as those after 1950, is awarded to a horse who wins all three races and is thereafter designated as a Triple Crown winner. The races are traditionally run in May and early June of each year, although global events have resulted in schedule adjustments, such as in 1945 and 2020.

The first winner of all three Triple Crown races was Sir Barton in 1919. Some journalists began using the term Triple Crown to refer to the three races as early as 1923, but it was not until Gallant Fox won the three events in 1930 that Charles Hatton of the Daily Racing Form put the term to common use.

Only 13 horses have ever won the Triple Crown: Sir Barton (1919), Gallant Fox (1930), Omaha (1935), War Admiral (1937), Whirlaway (1941), Count Fleet (1943), Assault (1946), Citation (1948), Secretariat (1973), Seattle Slew (1977), Affirmed (1978), American Pharoah (2015), and Justify (2018). As of 2026, American Pharoah and Justify are the only living Triple Crown winners.

James E. "Sunny Jim" Fitzsimmons was the first trainer to win the Triple Crown more than once; he trained both Gallant Fox and Omaha for the Belair Stud. Gallant Fox and Omaha are also the only father-son pair to each win the Triple Crown. Bob Baffert became the second trainer to win the Triple Crown more than once, training American Pharoah and Justify. Belair Stud and Calumet Farm are tied as owners with the most Triple Crown victories with two apiece; Calumet's winners were Whirlaway and Citation. Eddie Arcaro rode both of Calumet's Triple Crown champions and is the only jockey to win more than one Triple Crown. Willie Simms is the only African-American jockey to win all three races that would compose the triple crown. During the 1898 Preakness Stakes he rode a different horse, Sly Fox and won the race.

Secretariat holds the stakes record time for each of the three races. His time of 2:24 for 1 1/2 miles in the 1973 Belmont Stakes also set a world record that still stands.

== Development ==
The three Triple Crown races had existed long before the series received its name: the Belmont Stakes was first run in 1867, the Preakness in 1873, and the Kentucky Derby in 1875.

On December 31, 1912, Johnson N. Camden Jr. proposed a Triple Crown of Kentucky races to be held at Lexington, Louisville, and Latonia, then later a "Quadruple Stake" to include the Douglas Park Racetrack. Neither of these appear to have materialized.

The term "triple crown" in reference to the current three races was in use at least by 1923, although Daily Racing Form writer Charles Hatton is commonly credited with originating the term in 1930.

The order in which the races are run has varied. From 1932 through 2019, the Kentucky Derby was run first, followed by the Preakness, and then the Belmont. Running the three races in a five-week span was instituted in 1969. The Preakness was run before the Kentucky Derby 11 times, most recently in 1931. The Kentucky Derby and Preakness have been run on the same day on two occasions: May 12, 1917, and May 13, 1922.

Scheduling has occasionally been affected by global events. During World War II, the 1945 Kentucky Derby was moved from May 5 to June 9, with the Preakness and Belmont following on June 16 and 23, respectively. In 2020, the Triple Crown was altered from its usual sequence due to the effects of the COVID-19 pandemic. The adjusted schedule started with the Belmont Stakes on June 20, at the shortened distance of 1 1/8 miles (9 furlongs). The Kentucky Derby ran on September 5, and finally the Preakness on October 3. 2020 also marked the first time for the Belmont Stakes to be run as the opening leg of the Triple Crown.

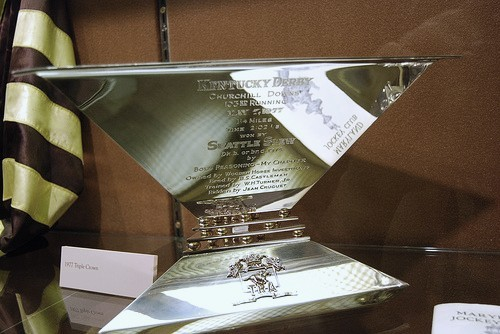
The Triple Crown Trophy

Each Triple Crown race is open to both colts and fillies. Although fillies have won each of the individual Triple Crown races, none has won the Triple Crown itself. Despite attempts to develop a "Filly Triple Crown" or a "Triple Tiara" for fillies only, no set series of three races has consistently remained in the public eye, and at least four different types of races have been used. Two fillies won the series of the Kentucky Oaks, the Pimlico Oaks (now the Black-Eyed Susan Stakes), and the Coaching Club American Oaks, in 1949 and 1952, but the racing press did not designate either accomplishment as a "Triple Crown". In 1961, the New York Racing Association created a filly Triple Crown of in-state races only, but the races changed over the years. Eight fillies won the NYRA Triple Tiara between 1968 and 1993.

Gelded colts may run in any of the three races today, but they were prohibited from entering the Belmont between 1919 and 1957. Geldings have won each of the individual races, but like fillies, no gelding has ever won the Triple Crown. The closest was Funny Cide, who won the Derby and the Preakness in 2003.

Each of the races is held on a dirt track, rather than the turf surfaces commonly used for important races elsewhere in the world.

=== 2024–2026 changes ===
In 2024 and 2025, the Belmont Stakes was run at Saratoga Race Course at the shorter distance of 1 1/4 miles due to the construction of a new grandstand and racing surface at Belmont Park.

In 2026, the Belmont Stakes was run again at Saratoga, while the second race in the series, the Preakness Stakes, was run at Maryland's Laurel Park because of renovations at Pimlico Race Course. The Preakness and Belmont are expected to return in 2027 to Pimlico and Belmont Park, respectively.

=== 2027: Thoroughbred Championship Series and Preakness changes ===
On August 3, 2026, Churchill Downs Incorporated and the New York Racing Association (NYRA) announced the Thoroughbred Championship Series (TCS), a new six-race series for three-year-olds run at Churchill Downs and the NYRA's Belmont Park and Saratoga. The series is set to begin in 2027 and includes the Kentucky Derby and Belmont Stakes as its first two races. The series not including the Preakness Stakes has drawn the future of the Triple Crown into jeopardy, especially as three of the prior five Kentucky Derby winners have not participated in the Preakness due to the two-week turn-around time between the races, forfeiting their chance at the Triple Crown in the process.

On August 5, two days after the TCS announcement, Maryland Governor Wes Moore announced that the Preakness Stakes in 2027 would move eight days later to the fourth Sunday in May. This change would leave 22 days between the Derby and Preakness, and 13 days between the Preakness and Belmont. It would mark the first time in history that a Triple Crown race is run on a Sunday. It would also result in the race being run on the weekend of the Memorial Day holiday in 2028, should the schedule remain unchanged. It was also announced that the Preakness' media rights with NBC were extended through 2032.

Triple Crown races
	Kentucky Derby "The Run for the Roses"	Preakness Stakes "The Run for the Black-Eyed Susans"	Belmont Stakes "The Test of the Champion"
Date	First Saturday in May	Fourth Sunday in May	First or Second Saturday in June
Current Track	Churchill Downs	Pimlico Race Course	Belmont Park
Location	Louisville, Kentucky	Baltimore, Maryland	Elmont, New York
Distance	1 1/4 miles (10 furlongs; 2,000 m)	1 3/16 miles (9.5 furlongs; 1,900 m)	1 1/2 miles (12 furlongs; 2,400 m)
Thoroughbred Championship Series Status	Yes	No	Yes
Background	Inaugurated in 1875, the race was originally 1 1/2 miles (2,400 m) until 1897 when it was shortened to its current distance. It is the only one of the three races to have run continuously from its inception. Colts and geldings carry 126 pounds (57 kg) and fillies 121 pounds (55 kg). The field has been limited to 20 horses since 1975.	Started in 1873 and continuously run since 1894, it is the shortest of the three races. Pimlico was the home of the race from 1873 to 1889 and again from 1908 until the present. The Preakness was not run from 1891 to 1893. Weights are the same as for the Derby. Field is limited to 14 horses.	Begun in 1867, it is the oldest of the three races, though not held in 1911 and 1912 due to anti-gambling legislation in New York. The race was held at various New York tracks until 1905 when Belmont Park became the permanent location. Distance varied from 1 5/8 to 1 1/8 miles (2,600 to 1,800 m) until set at 1 1/2 miles (2,400 m) in 1926, making it the longest of the three. Weight assignments are the same as the other two races. Field is limited to 16 horses.
Trophy	The Kentucky Derby Trophy	The Woodlawn Vase	The August Belmont Trophy

== Winners ==
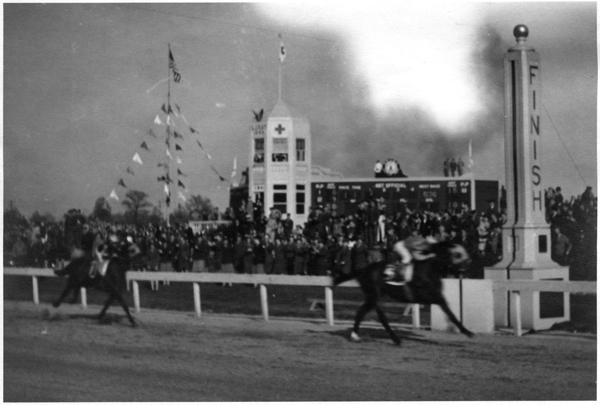
The sixth winner, Count Fleet, in the 1943 Kentucky Derby

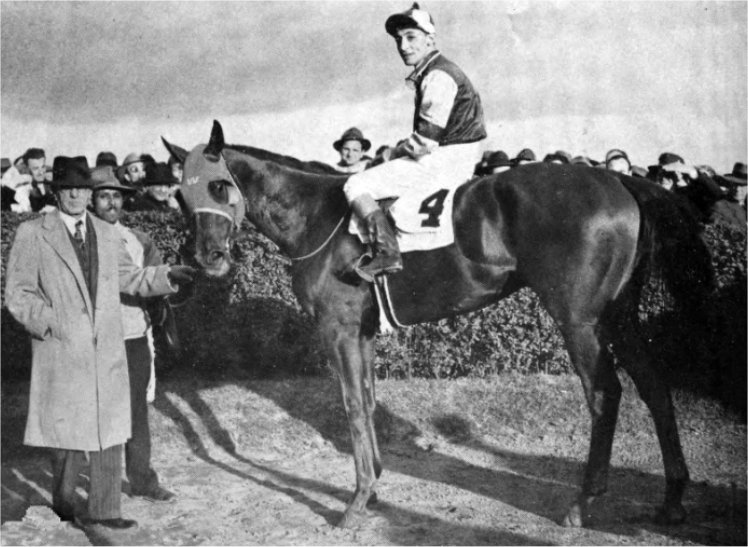
The seventh winner, Assault, in 1946 at Westchester Handicap

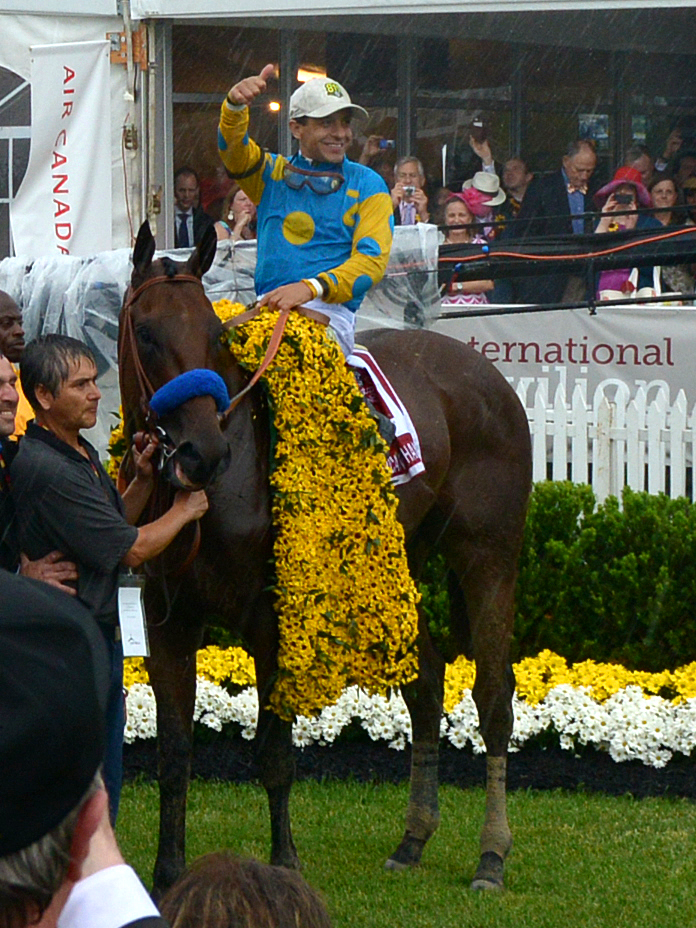
American Pharoah, the 12th winner, at the 2015 Preakness Stakes

Triple Crown winners
Year	Winner	Jockey	Trainer	Owner	Breeder	Colors
1919	Sir Barton	Johnny Loftus	H. Guy Bedwell	J. K. L. Ross	John E. Madden	
1930	Gallant Fox	Earl Sande	Jim Fitzsimmons	Belair Stud	Belair Stud	
1935	Omaha	Willie "Smokey" Saunders	Jim Fitzsimmons	Belair Stud	Belair Stud	
1937	War Admiral	Charles Kurtsinger	George Conway	Samuel D. Riddle	Samuel D. Riddle	
1941	Whirlaway	Eddie Arcaro	Ben A. Jones	Calumet Farm	Calumet Farm	
1943	Count Fleet	Johnny Longden	Don Cameron	Fannie Hertz	Fannie Hertz	
1946	Assault	Warren Mehrtens	Max Hirsch	King Ranch	King Ranch	Assault
1948	Citation	Eddie Arcaro	Horace A. "Jimmy" Jones	Calumet Farm	Calumet Farm	
1973	Secretariat	Ron Turcotte	Lucien Laurin	Meadow Stable	Meadow Stable	
1977	Seattle Slew	Jean Cruguet	William H. Turner Jr.	Mickey and Karen L. Taylor, Tayhill Stable/Jim Hill, et al.	Ben S. Castleman	
1978	Affirmed	Steve Cauthen	Laz Barrera	Harbor View Farm	Harbor View Farm	Affirmed
2015	American Pharoah	Victor Espinoza	Bob Baffert	Ahmed Zayat	Ahmed Zayat	American Pharoah
2018	Justify	Mike Smith	Bob Baffert	China Horse Club; Head of Plains Partners; Starlight Racing; WinStar Farm	John D. Gunther	†
† During his 2018 bid for the Triple Crown, Justify used the colors of WinStar Farms (white, green and black star) for the Kentucky Derby and Preakness Stakes. The colors of China Horse Club (red, yellow stars and sleeves) were used in the Belmont Stakes.

At completion of the 2016 season, the three Triple Crown races have attracted 4,224 entrants. Of these, 292 horses have won a single leg of the Triple Crown, 52 horses have won two of the races (23 the Kentucky Derby and Preakness Stakes, 18 the Preakness Stakes and Belmont Stakes, and 11 the Kentucky Derby and Belmont Stakes), and 13 horses have won all three races. Pillory won both the Preakness Stakes and Belmont Stakes in 1922, a year when it was impossible to win the Triple Crown because the Kentucky Derby and Preakness Stakes were run on the same day.

10 of the 13 winners have been "homebreds", owned at the time of their win by their breeders.

Jim Fitzsimmons and Bob Baffert are the only two trainers to have two horses win the Triple Crown, with Fitzsimmons training the sire/son combination of 1930 winner Gallant Fox and 1935 winner Omaha and Baffert training 2015 winner American Pharoah and 2018 winner Justify. The wins by Fitzsimmons were also the first time that an owner and the first time that a breeder, Belair Stud holding both duties, had a repeat win of the Triple Crown. Calumet Farm is the only other owner with two Triple Crown horses, 1941 winner Whirlaway and 1948 winner Citation. Eddie Arcaro is the only jockey to ride two horses to the Triple Crown, both for Calumet: Whirlaway and Citation. Those two horses' trainers, Ben Jones and Jimmy Jones, were father and son.

All 13 horses were foaled in the United States. Most owners, trainers, and jockeys were American-born, though there were a number of exceptions: jockey Johnny Longden was born in England and raised in Canada; Ron Turcotte was Canadian. French-born jockey Jean Cruguet; and jockey Victor Espinoza, from Mexico. Jockey Willie Saunders is considered a Canadian jockey because he spent part of his childhood there, but was born in Montana. Laz Barrera, trainer of Affirmed, was from Cuba; Secretariat's trainer, Lucien Laurin was Canadian. Owner Fannie Hertz was married to John D. Hertz, who was born in Slovakia; owner Ahmed Zayat was born in Egypt. The horse Sir Barton was foaled in the United States but had a Canadian owner, J. K. L. Ross, at the time of his Triple Crown win. Justify's large ownership group included individuals from both the United States and China.

=== Records ===
Secretariat holds the stakes record for each of the Triple Crown races, the Kentucky Derby (1:59 2/5 ) the Preakness Stakes (1:53), and the Belmont Stakes (2:24).

At 18, Steve Cauthen became the youngest jockey to win the Triple Crown, riding Affirmed in 1978. At 52, Mike Smith became the oldest jockey to win the Triple Crown, riding Justify in 2018.

=== Other notable achievements ===
Only one horse, Alydar, placed (finished second) in all three races. He was defeated each time by Affirmed in 1978 by a combined margin of two lengths. His trainer John Veitch is the only trainer to have done this with one horse. In 1995, D. Wayne Lukas became the first and only major figure (owner, jockey, or trainer) to win all three Triple Crown races with different horses, Thunder Gulch in the Derby and Belmont, Timber Country in the Preakness. Lukas also is the only trainer to have won six consecutive Triple Crown races, adding his 1995 wins, having won the 1994 Preakness and Belmont with Tabasco Cat and the 1996 Derby with Grindstone.

Like Veitch, only with two different horses, Bob Baffert also had second-place finishes in all three legs of the Triple Crown, both owned by Ahmed Zayat: in 2012, Bodemeister finished second in the Kentucky Derby and Preakness stakes to I'll Have Another, then Paynter was entered and finished second to Union Rags. Baffert and Zayat teamed up again for the 2015 Triple Crown victory of American Pharoah.

Gallant Fox is the only Triple Crown winner to sire another U.S. Triple Crown winner, Omaha. Affirmed sired Peteski, winner of the 1993 Canadian Triple Crown.

Jockey Julie Krone became the first (and currently only) woman to win a Triple Crown race when she won the 1993 Belmont Stakes aboard Colonial Affair.

Whirlaway, in addition to winning the 1941 Triple Crown, also won the Travers Stakes that year, the first and only horse to date to accomplish that feat. American Pharoah, in addition to winning the 2015 Triple Crown, also won the Breeders' Cup Classic that year. As the Breeders' Cup was not established until 1984, American Pharoah was the first (and currently only) horse to sweep those four races, a feat now known as the Grand Slam.

Arcangelo won the 2023 Belmont Stakes, making Jena Antonucci the first female trainer to win a Triple Crown race.

== Gaps between wins ==
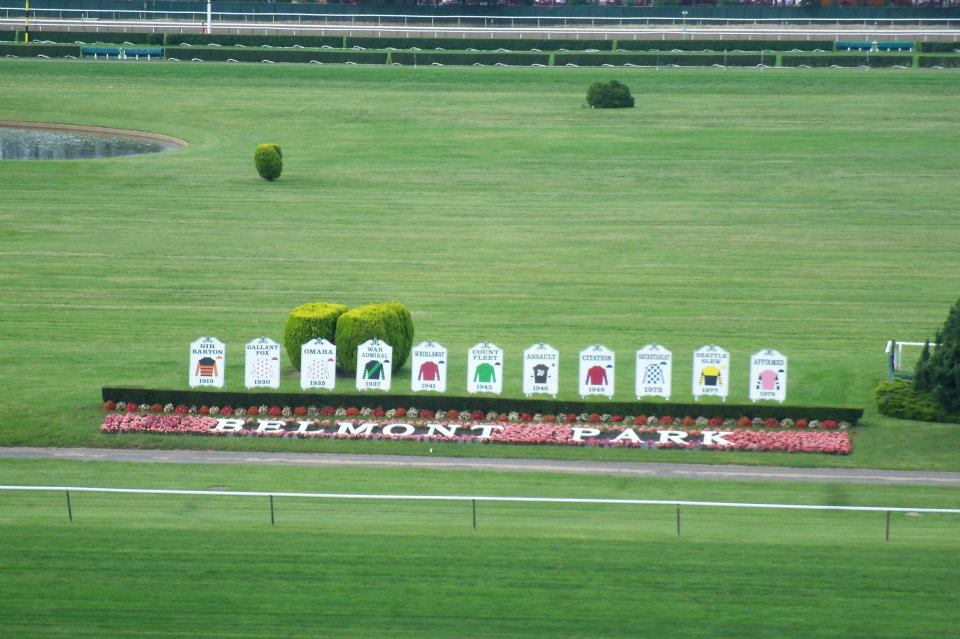
11 Triple Crown Winners in 2012 honored at Belmont Park, before additional wins in 2015 and 2018.

After the first Triple Crown winner, Sir Barton, in 1919, there was not another winner until Gallant Fox in 1930, a gap of 11 years. Between 1930 and 1948, seven horses won the Triple Crown, with five years being the longest gap between winners. However, following the 1948 win of Citation, there was a considerable gap of 25 years before Secretariat ended the drought of Triple Crown champions in 1973. Between 1973 and 1978, there were three Triple Crown winners.

After Affirmed's Triple Crown in 1978, the longest drought in Triple Crown history began in 1979 with Spectacular Bid's failed Triple Crown attempt when he finished third in the Belmont. It lasted until American Pharoah won in 2015, a gap of 37 years.

Between 1979 and 2014, thirteen horses won both the Derby and Preakness, but not the Belmont. Of those, Real Quiet came the closest, losing the Belmont Stakes by a nose in 1998. Another dramatic near-miss was Charismatic, who led the Belmont Stakes in the final furlong in 1999, but fractured his left front leg in the final stretch and fell back to third. Five other horses lost the Kentucky Derby but won the Preakness and the Belmont, and three won the Derby and the Belmont, but not the Preakness. The 37-year gap between the Triple Crown wins of Affirmed and American Pharoah drew criticism of the system. As far back as 1986, reporters noted that horses who were fresh for the Belmont had an advantage. In 2003, Gary Stevens stated in an interview with Charlie Rose that he did not believe there would be another Triple Crown winner because of the tendency for owners to put fresh horses in the Preakness and Belmont Stakes. California Chrome co-owner Steve Coburn was particularly critical of the Triple Crown system in post-Belmont remarks in 2014; he considered the system to be unfair, arguing that there would never be another Triple Crown winner in his lifetime unless only horses that competed in the Kentucky Derby and Preakness competed at the Belmont. By 2014, six of the previous eight Belmont winners had not competed in either of the first two legs of the Triple Crown. Additionally, from 2006 to 2014, the Belmont winner was a horse who had not competed in the Preakness.

== Unsuccessful bids ==
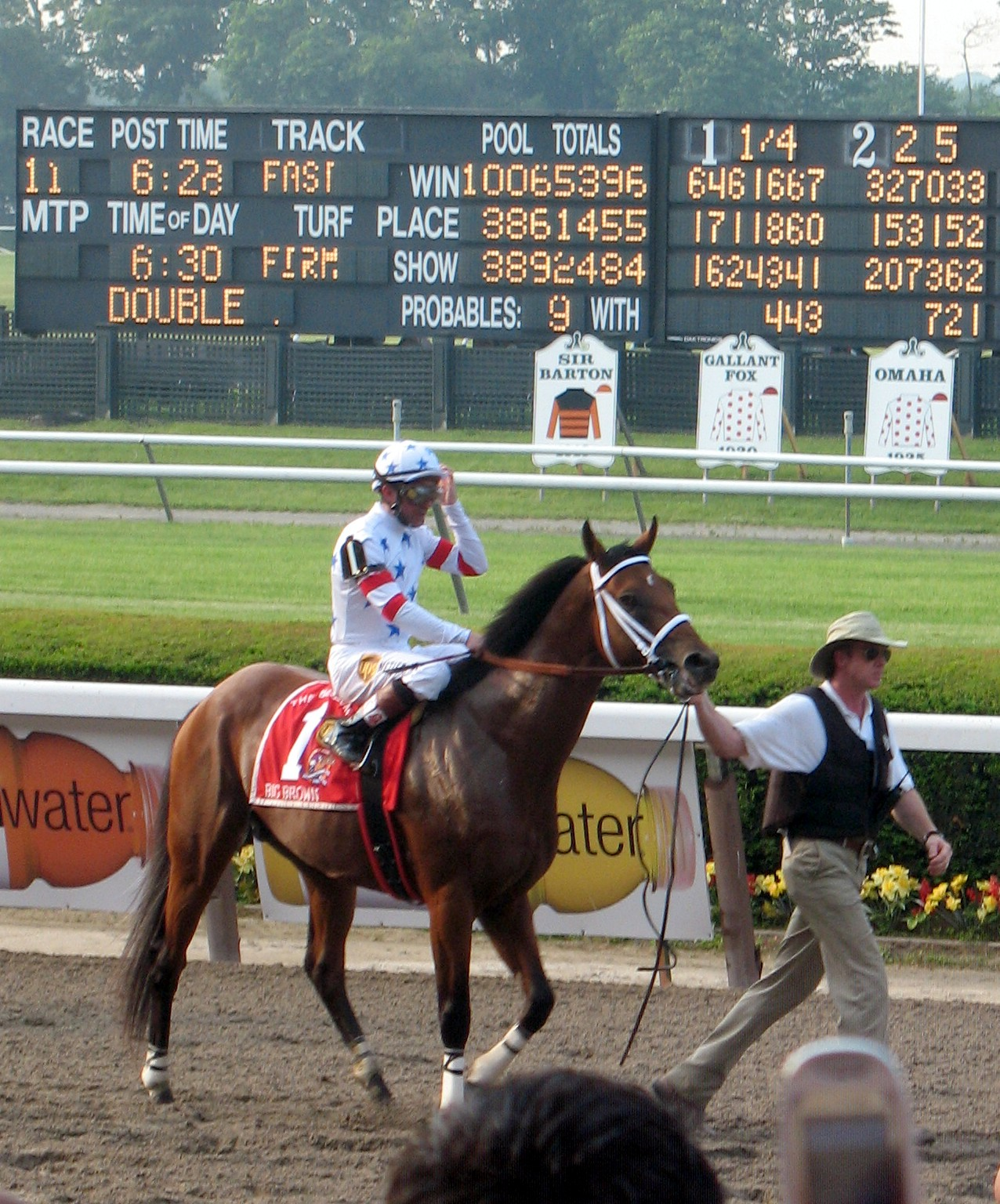
Big Brown, the winner of the Kentucky Derby and Preakness Stakes, at the 2008 Belmont Stakes, where he was pulled up and did not finish.

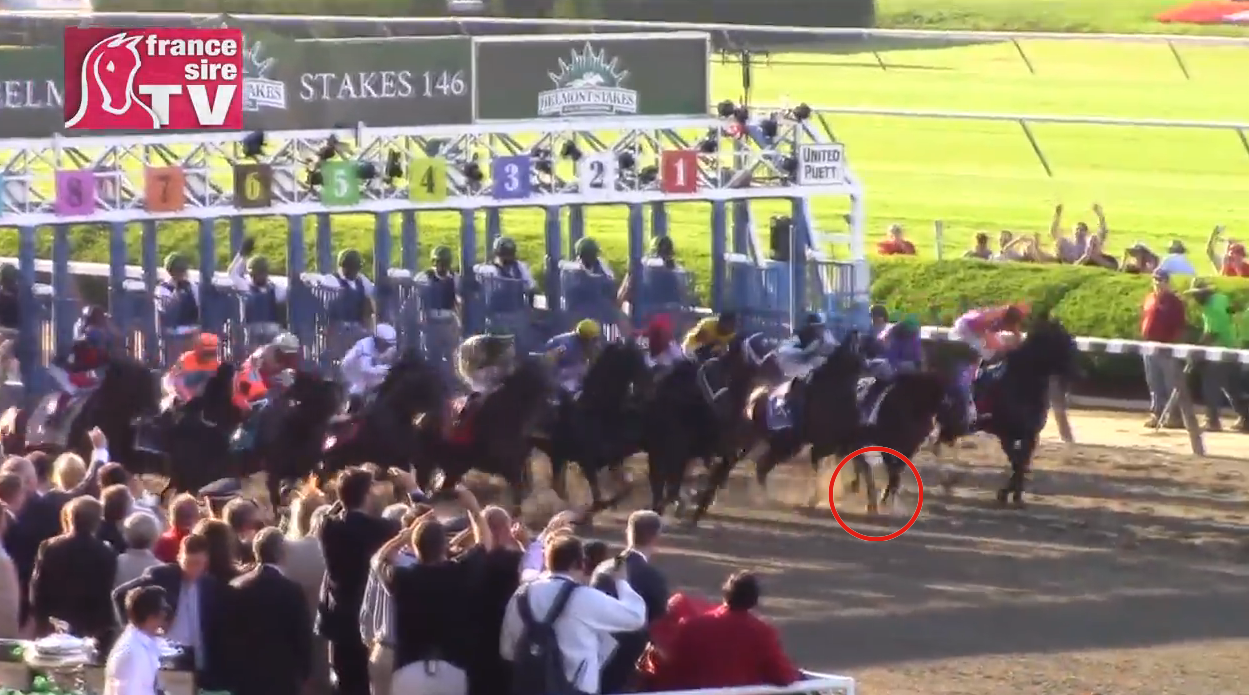
California Chrome (second from right) was stepped on by the number 3 horse while leaving the starting gate at the 2014 Belmont Stakes

Since all three events were inaugurated, as of 2025, 23 horses have won the Derby and Preakness but not the Belmont (ten of which placed):

- 1932: Burgoo King did not enter the Belmont due to lameness.^{:78, 182}
- 1936: Bold Venture did not enter the Belmont due to lameness.^{:78, 182}
- 1944: Pensive was the first horse to contest but lose the Belmont after winning the first two legs. He placed second to Bounding Home,^{:78} who had neither run in the Derby nor the Preakness.
- 1958: Tim Tam, defeated by six lengths by Cavan, who had neither contested the Derby nor Preakness.
- 1961: Carry Back, "sore" after the race, was seventh of nine entries, 14 1/2 lengths behind the winner, a longshot named Sherluck.
- 1964: Northern Dancer, defeated by Quadrangle.
- 1966: Kauai King, defeated by Amberoid.
- 1968: Forward Pass, defeated by Stage Door Johnny by 1 1/4 lengths.
- 1969: Majestic Prince, second by 5 1/2 lengths to Arts and Letters. Loss attributed to fatigue and lameness.
- 1971: Cañonero II, fourth in the Belmont to 34–1 longshot Pass Catcher, the loss attributed to a hoof problem.
- 1979: Spectacular Bid, third in Belmont, was alleged to have stepped on a safety pin the morning of the race, though another theory blamed rider error by an inexperienced young jockey moving him too soon. He finished 3 1/4 lengths behind Coastal and a neck behind the second-place horse, Golden Act.
- 1981: Pleasant Colony, third in Belmont, 1 1/2 lengths behind Summing and the second-place horse, Highland Blade.
- 1987: Alysheba finished fourth in Belmont behind Bet Twice, Cryptoclearance, and Gulch.
- 1989: Sunday Silence, second in Belmont, eight lengths behind Easy Goer.
- 1997: Silver Charm, second in Belmont, 3/4 length behind Touch Gold.
- 1998: Real Quiet, second in Belmont after a photo finish, a nose behind Victory Gallop.
- 1999: Charismatic, third in Belmont, 1 1/2 lengths behind Lemon Drop Kid and second-place Vision and Verse. Charismatic was pulled up soon after the finish, vanned off with a bone fracture. He survived and was retired to stud.
- 2002: War Emblem stumbled at the gate in Belmont and finished eighth out of 11. Winner Sarava scored an upset at record odds of 70–1.
- 2003: Funny Cide, third in Belmont, five lengths behind Empire Maker, and 4 1/4 lengths behind second-place horse, Ten Most Wanted.
- 2004: Smarty Jones, second in Belmont, one length behind Birdstone.
- 2008: Big Brown was pulled up in the home stretch of the Belmont, eased to a last-place finish. The winner was Da' Tara. A hoof problem had limited Big Brown's training and may have been a factor in his defeat.
- 2012: I'll Have Another was scratched from the Belmont the day before the race due to a tendon injury.
- 2014: California Chrome finished in a dead heat for 4th in the Belmont. Another horse stepped on him leaving the gate, and he ran the race with an injury to his heel and a scrape on his tendon.

Another 30 horses have won the Belmont after winning only one of the first two legs.

== Sponsorship and broadcasting ==
The first live national television broadcast of a Triple Crown race occurred with the 1947 Belmont Stakes on CBS. The following year, the Preakness Stakes was broadcast live and the Kentucky Derby was filmed to be broadcast the following day.

Originally, the three races largely organized their own nominations procedure, marketing and television broadcast rights. In 1985, Triple Crown Productions was created when the owner of Spend a Buck chose not to run in the other two Triple Crown races because of a financial incentive offered to any Kentucky Derby winner who could win a set of competing races in New Jersey. The organizers of the three races realized that they needed to work together.

Efforts to unify the sponsorship and marketing of all three Triple Crown races began in 1987 when ABC Sports negotiated a deal with Chrysler to pay $5 million to any horse that swept all three races, and $1 million each year there was no Triple Crown sweep to the horse with the highest combined Triple Crown finish. This sponsorship lasted until 1993. The end of the $1 million participation bonus was linked to the breakdown of Prairie Bayou at the Belmont Stakes that year and the uncomfortable situation that arose when the Kentucky Derby winner, Sea Hero, was given the bonus following a seventh-place finish.

In 1995, Visa took over the sponsorship with a 10-year contract, naming the series the Visa Triple Crown and offering only the $5 million bonus to a horse that could sweep the Triple Crown. Along with sponsorship by Visa, NBC Sports paid $51.5 million for broadcast rights to all three races, with the revenue split giving 50% of the total to Churchill Downs and 25% each to Pimlico and to the New York Racing Association (NYRA).

The Visa deal—and the cooperative effort—ended after 2005. The NYRA felt that they did not get a fair share of the revenue, particularly when the Belmont had the highest ratings of all three races in the years where a Triple Crown was on the line. From 2001 through 2013, average viewership for the Belmont was 7 million when the Triple Crown was not at stake, whereas viewership averaged 13 million when it was. (Note: These were 2002 for War Emblem, 2003 for Funny Cide and 2004 for Smarty Jones.) With the contract term ending, the NYRA went to ESPN on ABC for the 2006 Belmont, while the broadcasts of the Derby and Preakness remained with NBC. Visa chose to remain as a sponsor of only Kentucky Derby for the next five years. As a result of the divided broadcast, Triple Crown Productions was unable to obtain a new sponsor.

In 2011, NBC Sports once again became the broadcaster of all three Triple Crown races in separate broadcast deals; including an extension to its existing rights to the Kentucky Derby and Preakness Stakes, plus establishing a new 5-year deal to broadcast the Belmont Stakes after ABC and ESPN declined to renew their previous contract. All three deals last through 2015, and include supplementary coverage on NBC Sports Network for all three races. The additional coverage included 14 1/2 hours of Kentucky Derby pre-race coverage including an hour and a half live special for the Kentucky Oaks and six and a half hours of Preakness Stakes pre-race coverage including a one-hour live special on the Black-Eyed Susan Stakes, both carried on NBC Sports Network.

Today Triple Crown Productions LLC, based at Churchill Downs, is responsible for collecting nominations to the annual Triple Crown races.

Years	Sponsor	Bonuses
1987–1993	Chrysler Corporation	$1 million (best overall record) $5 million (three wins)
1995–2005	Visa	$5 million (three wins)

In February 2011, ABC/ESPN dropped out of the negotiations to renew broadcast rights to the Belmont Stakes. NBC obtained the contract through 2015, once again uniting all three races on the same network. In 2014, NBC extended their contract for the Kentucky Derby through 2025. NBC then renewed its rights to the Preakness and Belmont through 2022. In January 2022, Fox Sports acquired the broadcast rights to the Belmont Stakes for eight years beginning in 2023.

== Individual race winners ==
Key for full list of race winners
†	Denotes winners of the Triple Crown
*	Denotes winners of the Derby and Preakness but not the Belmont
#	Denotes winners of the other two combinations of 2 out of the 3 Triple Crown races

Full list of race winners
Year	Kentucky Derby	Preakness Stakes	Belmont Stakes
1867			Ruthless^{[Fy]}
1868			General Duke
1869			Fenian
1870			Kingfisher
1871			Harry Bassett
1872			Joe Daniels
1873		Survivor	Springbok
1874		Culpepper	Saxon
1875	Aristides	Tom Ochiltree	Calvin
1876	Vagrant	Shirley	Algerine
1877	Baden-Baden	# Cloverbrook	# Cloverbrook
1878	Day Star	# Duke of Magenta	# Duke of Magenta
1879	Lord Murphy	Harold	Spendthrift
1880	Fonso	# Grenada	# Grenada
1881	Hindoo	# Saunterer	# Saunterer
1882	Apollo	Vanguard	Forester
1883	Leonatus	Jacobus	George Kinney
1884	Buchanan	Knight of Ellerslie	Panique
1885	Joe Cotton	Tecumseh	Tyrant
1886	Ben Ali	The Bard	Inspector B
1887	Montrose	Dunboyne	Hanover
1888	Macbeth II	Refund	Sir Dixon
1889	Spokane	Buddhist	Eric
1890	Riley	Montague (Note: The 1890 Preakness Stakes was held at Morris Park Racecourse in The Bronx, New York.)	Burlington
1891	Kingman	^{RNR}	Foxford
1892	Azra	^{RNR}	Patron
1893	Lookout	^{RNR}	Commanche
1894	Chant	Assignee (Note: From 1894 to 1908, the Preakness Stakes were held at Gravesend Race Track on Coney Island, New York.)	Henry of Navarre
1895	Halma	# Belmar	# Belmar
1896	Ben Brush	Margrave	Hastings
1897	Typhoon II	Paul Kauvar	Scottish Chieftain
1898	Plaudit	Sly Fox	Bowling Brook
1899	Manuel	Half Time	Jean Bereaud
1900	Lieut. Gibson	Hindus	Ildrim
1901	His Eminence	The Parader	Commando
1902	Alan-a-Dale	Old England	Masterman
1903	Judge Himes	Flocarline^{[Fy]}	Africander
1904	Elwood	Bryn Mawr	Delhi
1905	Agile	Cairngorm	Tanya^{[Fy]}
1906	Sir Huon	Whimsical^{[Fy]}	Burgomaster
1907	Pink Star	Don Enrique	Peter Pan I
1908	Stone Street	Royal Tourist	Colin
1909	Wintergreen	Effendi	Joe Madden
1910	Donau	Layminster	Sweep
1911	Meridian	Watervale	^{RNR}
1912	Worth	Colonel Holloway	^{RNR}
1913	Donerail	Buskin	Prince Eugene
1914	Old Rosebud	Holiday	Luke McLuke
1915	Regret^{[Fy]}	Rhine Maiden^{[Fy]}	The Finn
1916	George Smith	Damrosch	Friar Rock
1917	Omar Khayyam (Note: In 1917 and 1922, the Kentucky Derby and Preakness Stakes were held on the same day.)	Kalitan	Hourless
1918	Exterminator	War Cloud (Note: The 1918 Preakness Stakes was held in two divisions due to a large field. War Cloud won one and Jack Hare Jr. the other.); Jack Hare Jr.	Johren
1919	† Sir Barton	† Sir Barton	† Sir Barton
1920	Paul Jones	# Man o' War	# Man o' War
1921	Behave Yourself	Broomspun	Grey Lag
1922	Morvich	# Pillory	# Pillory
1923	# Zev	Vigil	# Zev
1924	Black Gold	Nellie Morse^{[Fy]}	Mad Play
1925	Flying Ebony	Coventry	American Flag
1926	Bubbling Over	Display	Crusader
1927	Whiskery	Bostonian	Chance Shot
1928	Reigh Count	Victorian	Vito
1929	Clyde Van Dusen	Dr. Freeland	Blue Larkspur
1930	† Gallant Fox	† Gallant Fox	† Gallant Fox
1931	# Twenty Grand	Mate	# Twenty Grand
1932	* Burgoo King	* Burgoo King	Faireno
1933	Brokers Tip	Head Play	Hurryoff
1934	Cavalcade	High Quest	Peace Chance
1935	† Omaha	† Omaha	† Omaha
1936	* Bold Venture	* Bold Venture	Granville
1937	† War Admiral	† War Admiral	† War Admiral
1938	Lawrin	Dauber	Pasteurized
1939	# Johnstown	Challedon	# Johnstown
1940	Gallahadion	# Bimelech	# Bimelech
1941	† Whirlaway	† Whirlaway	† Whirlaway
1942	# Shut Out	Alsab	# Shut Out
1943	† Count Fleet	† Count Fleet	† Count Fleet
1944	* Pensive	* Pensive	Bounding Home
1945	Hoop Jr.	Polynesian	Pavot
1946	† Assault	† Assault	† Assault
1947	Jet Pilot	Faultless	Phalanx
1948	† Citation	† Citation	† Citation
1949	Ponder	# Capot	# Capot
1950	# Middleground	Hill Prince	# Middleground
1951	Count Turf	Bold	Counterpoint
1952	Hill Gail	Blue Man	One Count
1953	Dark Star	# Native Dancer	# Native Dancer
1954	Determine	Hasty Road	High Gun
1955	Swaps	# Nashua	# Nashua
1956	# Needles	Fabius	# Needles
1957	Iron Liege	Bold Ruler	Gallant Man
1958	* Tim Tam	* Tim Tam	Cavan
1959	Tomy Lee	Royal Orbit	Sword Dancer
1960	Venetian Way	Bally Ache	Celtic Ash
1961	* Carry Back	* Carry Back	Sherluck
1962	Decidedly	Greek Money	Jaipur
1963	# Chateaugay	Candy Spots	# Chateaugay (Note: Due to reconstruction at Belmont Park, the Belmont Stakes were held at Aqueduct Racetrack in Queens, New York, from 1963 to 1967.)
1964	* Northern Dancer	* Northern Dancer	Quadrangle
1965	Lucky Debonair	Tom Rolfe	Hail To All
1966	* Kauai King	* Kauai King	Amberoid
1967	Proud Clarion	# Damascus	# Damascus
1968	* Forward Pass (Note: Dancer's Image was disqualified as the winner of the 1968 Kentucky Derby due to a post-race failed drug test.)	* Forward Pass	Stage Door Johnny
1969	* Majestic Prince	* Majestic Prince	Arts and Letters
1970	Dust Commander	Personality	High Echelon
1971	* Canonero II	* Canonero II	Pass Catcher
1972	# Riva Ridge	Bee Bee Bee	# Riva Ridge
1973	† Secretariat	† Secretariat	† Secretariat
1974	Cannonade	# Little Current	# Little Current
1975	Foolish Pleasure	Master Derby	Avatar
1976	# Bold Forbes	Elocutionist	# Bold Forbes
1977	† Seattle Slew	† Seattle Slew	† Seattle Slew
1978	† Affirmed	† Affirmed	† Affirmed
1979	* Spectacular Bid	* Spectacular Bid	Coastal
1980	Genuine Risk^{[Fy]}	Codex	Temperence Hill
1981	* Pleasant Colony	* Pleasant Colony	Summing
1982	Gato Del Sol	Aloma's Ruler	Conquistador Cielo
1983	Sunny's Halo	Deputed Testamony	Caveat
1984	# Swale	Gate Dancer	# Swale
1985	Spend A Buck	Tank's Prospect	Creme Fraiche
1986	Ferdinand	Snow Chief	Danzig Connection
1987	* Alysheba	* Alysheba	Bet Twice
1988	Winning Colors^{[Fy]}	# Risen Star	# Risen Star
1989	* Sunday Silence	* Sunday Silence	Easy Goer
1990	Unbridled	Summer Squall	Go And Go
1991	Strike the Gold	# Hansel	# Hansel
1992	Lil E. Tee	Pine Bluff	A.P. Indy
1993	Sea Hero	Prairie Bayou	Colonial Affair
1994	Go for Gin	# Tabasco Cat	# Tabasco Cat
1995	# Thunder Gulch	Timber Country	# Thunder Gulch
1996	Grindstone	Louis Quatorze	Editor's Note
1997	* Silver Charm	* Silver Charm	Touch Gold
1998	* Real Quiet	* Real Quiet	Victory Gallop
1999	* Charismatic	* Charismatic	Lemon Drop Kid
2000	Fusaichi Pegasus	Red Bullet	Commendable
2001	Monarchos	# Point Given	# Point Given
2002	* War Emblem	* War Emblem	Sarava
2003	* Funny Cide	* Funny Cide	Empire Maker
2004	* Smarty Jones	* Smarty Jones	Birdstone
2005	Giacomo	# Afleet Alex	# Afleet Alex
2006	Barbaro	Bernardini	Jazil
2007	Street Sense	Curlin	Rags to Riches^{[Fy]}
2008	* Big Brown	* Big Brown	Da' Tara
2009	Mine That Bird	Rachel Alexandra^{[Fy]}	Summer Bird
2010	Super Saver	Lookin at Lucky	Drosselmeyer
2011	Animal Kingdom	Shackleford	Ruler on Ice
2012	* I'll Have Another	* I'll Have Another	Union Rags (Note: I'll Have Another was scratched the afternoon prior to the Belmont due to tendonitis and was unable to attempt to win the race.)
2013	Orb	Oxbow	Palace Malice
2014	* California Chrome	* California Chrome	Tonalist
2015	† American Pharoah	† American Pharoah	† American Pharoah
2016	Nyquist	Exaggerator	Creator
2017	Always Dreaming	Cloud Computing	Tapwrit
2018	† Justify	† Justify	† Justify
2019	Country House (Note: Maximum Security was disqualified as the winner of the 2019 Kentucky Derby after he was judged to have interfered with another horse.)	War of Will	Sir Winston
2020	Authentic (Note: Due to concerns amid the COVID-19 pandemic, the three races were held out of order: Belmont Stakes, Kentucky Derby, then Preakness Stakes. The Belmont was run at 1 1/8 mile.)	Swiss Skydiver^{[Fy]}	Tiz the Law
2021	Mandaloun (Note: Medina Spirit was disqualified as the winner of the 2021 Kentucky Derby for a failed drug test.)	Rombauer	Essential Quality
2022	Rich Strike	Early Voting	Mo Donegal
2023	Mage	National Treasure	Arcangelo
2024	Mystik Dan	Seize the Grey	Dornoch (Note: Due to reconstruction at Belmont Park, the Belmont Stakes was held at Saratoga Race Course in Saratoga Springs, New York, from 2024 to 2026. The race was run at 1 1/4 mile.)
2025	# Sovereignty	Journalism	# Sovereignty
2026	# Golden Tempo	Napoleon Solo (Note: The 2026 Preakness Stakes was held at Laurel Park in Laurel, Maryland, due to reconstruction at Pimlico Race Course.)	# Golden Tempo

Notes

- ^{[Fy]} Denotes a filly. Fillies won the Kentucky Derby in 1915, 1980, and 1988, Preakness Stakes in 1903, 1906, 1915, 1924, 2009, and 2020, and Belmont Stakes in 1867, 1905, and 2007.
- ^{RNR} Race not run. The Belmont was not run in 1911 and 1912 due to anti-betting legislation passed in New York State. The Preakness did not run 1891–1893.

== See also ==
- American thoroughbred racing top attended events
- British Classic Races
- French Classic Races
- Triple Crown of Thoroughbred Racing
- Grand Slam of Thoroughbred racing
