= Sir Gallahad =

French-bred Thoroughbred racehorse

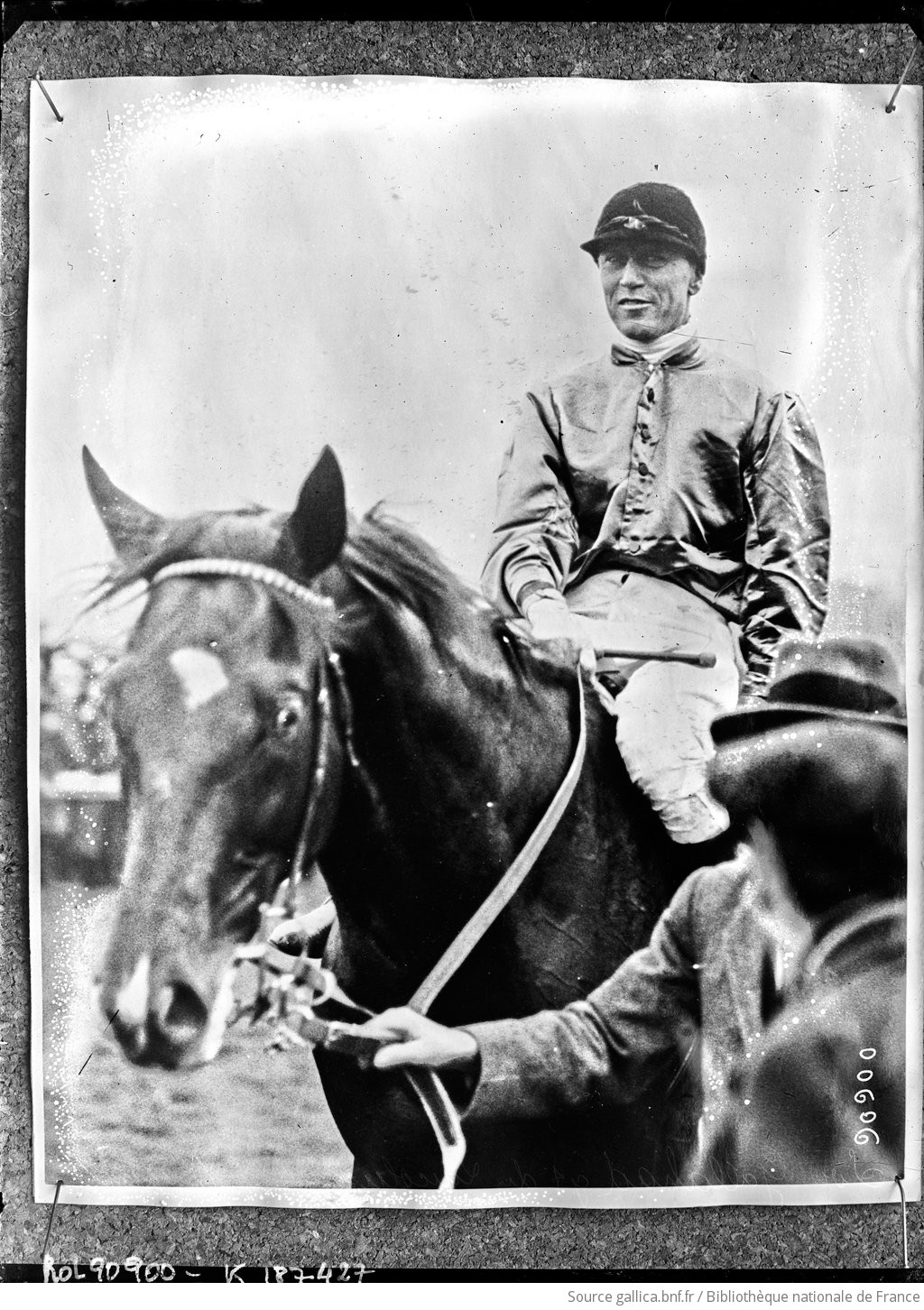
- Lincolnshire H. (26 March 1924)
- Sire: Teddy
- Grandsire: Ajax
- Dam: Plucky Liege
- Damsire: Spearmint
- Sex: Stallion
- Foaled: 1920
- Country: France
- Colour: Bay
- Breeder: Jefferson Davis Cohn
- Owner: Jefferson Davis Cohn; American Syndicate (1926)
- Trainer: Robert Denman
- Record: 25: 12-?-?
- Earnings: $9,960

Major wins
- Prix du Petit Couvert (1922); Prix Eclipse (1922); Prix Daphnis (1923); Poule d'Essai des Poulains (1923); Prix Jacques Le Marois (1923); Lincolnshire Handicap (1924); Prix Boiard (1924)

Awards
- Leading sire in North America (1930, 1933, 1934, 1940); Leading broodmare sire in North America (1939, 1943-1952, 1955)
- Last updated on August 28, 2008

Sir Gallahad (1920–1949) was a French Thoroughbred racehorse and an important sire in the United States.

== Racing career ==
Racing at age two in France for his British breeder/owner, Jefferson Davis Cohn, Sir Gallahad earned victory in three of his five starts but was overshadowed by the 1922 Champion colt, Epinard. At age three, he won four races, most notably the French 2,000 Guineas (Poule d'Essai des Poulains). At four, he won three important races in France and in England won the Lincolnshire Handicap. That year, he also went head-to-head with Epinard, winning a 6½ furlong event.

== Stud career ==
Sir Gallahad was retired after his four-year-old season to stand at stud at Haras du Bois-Roussel in Alençon. In 1926, owner Jefferson Davis Cohn sold him to an American syndicate made up of Robert A. Fairbairn, William Woodward Sr., Marshall Field III, and Arthur B. Hancock. In the United States, he was recorded as Sir Gallahad III for registration clarification. Although he was sent to the various breeding farms of his four owners, he stood primarily at Woodward's Belair Stud in Maryland and at Hancock's Claiborne Farm in Kentucky.

Sir Gallahad sired 65 Graded stakes race winners and was the United States Champion Sire four times.

Foaled	Name	Sex	Major Wins/Achievements
1927	Gallant Fox	Stallion	Triple Crown
1931	High Quest	Stallion	Preakness Stakes
1937	Gallahadion	Stallion	Kentucky Derby
1942	Hoop Jr.	Stallion	Kentucky Derby
1937	Fenelon	Stallion	Jockey Club Gold Cup
1937	Roman	Stallion	Fleetwing Handicap

In addition, Sir Gallahad was the U.S. Champion Broodmare Sire a record 12 times, with his daughters producing 139 stakes winners including two Hall of Fame racehorses: Challedon and Gallorette.

Sir Gallahad died at Claiborne Farm in 1949 and is buried in its equine cemetery.

== Pedigree ==
Pedigree of Sir Gallahad
Sire Teddy	Ajax	Flying Fox	Orme
Sire Teddy	Ajax	Flying Fox	Vampire
Sire Teddy	Ajax	Amie	Clamart
Sire Teddy	Ajax	Amie	Alice
Sire Teddy	Rondeau	Bay Ronald	Hampton
Sire Teddy	Rondeau	Bay Ronald	Black Duchess
Sire Teddy	Rondeau	Doremi	Bend Or
Sire Teddy	Rondeau	Doremi	Lady Emily
Dam Plucky Liege	Spearmint	Carbine	Musket
Dam Plucky Liege	Spearmint	Carbine	Mersey
Dam Plucky Liege	Spearmint	Maid of the Mint	Minting
Dam Plucky Liege	Spearmint	Maid of the Mint	Warble
Dam Plucky Liege	Concertina	St. Simon	Galopin
Dam Plucky Liege	Concertina	St. Simon	St. Angela
Dam Plucky Liege	Concertina	Comic Song	Petrarch
Dam Plucky Liege	Concertina	Comic Song	Frivolity
