= Preakness Stakes top four finishers =

Finishers in thoroughbred racing

This is a listing of the horses that finished in either first, second, third or fourth place and earned a purse check along with the number of starters in the Preakness Stakes, the second leg of the United States Triple Crown of Thoroughbred Racing run at 1-3/16 mile on dirt for three-year-olds at Pimlico Race Course in Baltimore, Maryland.

Year	Winner	Second	Third	Fourth	Starters
2026	Napoleon Solo	Iron Honor	Chip Honcho	Ocelli	14
2025	Journalism	Gosger	Sandman	Goal Oriented	9
2024	Seize The Grey	Mystik Dan	Catching Freedom	Tuscan Gold	8
2023	National Treasure	Blazing Sevens	Mage	Red Route One	7
2022	Early Voting	Epicenter	Creative Minister	Secret Oath	9
2021	Rombauer	Midnight Bourbon	Medina Spirit	Keepmeinmind	10
2020	Swiss Skydiver ‡	Authentic	Jesus' Team	Art Collector	11
2019	War of Will	Everfast	Owendale	Warrior's Charge	13
2018	**Justify †**	Bravazo	Tenfold	Good Magic	8
2017	Cloud Computing	Classic Empire	Senior Investment	Lookin at Lee	10
2016	Exaggerator	Cherry Wine	Nyquist	Stradivari	11
2015	**American Pharoah †**	Tale of Verve	Divining Rod	Dortmund	8
2014	California Chrome	Ride on Curlin	Social Inclusion	General a Rod	10
2013	Oxbow	Itsmyluckyday	Mylute	Orb	9
2012	I'll Have Another	Bodemeister	Creative Cause	Zetterholm	11
2011	Shackleford	Animal Kingdom	Astrology	Dialed In	14
2010	Lookin at Lucky	First Dude	Jackson Bend	Yawanna Twist	12
2009	Rachel Alexandra ‡	Mine That Bird	Musket Man	Flying Private	13
2008	Big Brown	Macho Again	Icabad Crane	Racecar Rhapsody	13
2007	Curlin	Street Sense	Hard Spun	C P West	9
2006	Bernardini	Sweetnorthernsaint	Hemingway's Key	Brother Derek	9
2005	Afleet Alex	Scrappy T	Giacomo	Sun King	14
2004	Smarty Jones	Rock Hard Ten	Eddington	Lion Heart	10
2003	Funny Cide	Midway Road	Peace Rules	Scrimshaw	10
2002	War Emblem	Magic Weisner	Proud Citizen	Harlan's Holiday	13
2001	Point Given	A P Valentine	Congaree	Dollar Bill	11
2000	Red Bullet	Fusaichi Pegasus	Impeachment	Captain Steve	8
1999	Charismatic	Menifee	Badge	Stephen Got Even	13
1998	Real Quiet	Victory Gallop	Classic Cat	Hot Wells	10
1997	Silver Charm	Free House	Captain Bodgit	Touch Gold	10
1996	Louis Quatorze	Skip Away	Editor's Note	Cavonnier	12
1995	Timber Country	Oliver's Twist	Thunder Gulch	Star Standard	11
1994	Tabasco Cat	Go for Gin	Concern	Kandaly	10
1993	Prairie Bayou	Cherokee Run	El Bakan	Personal Hope	12
1992	Pine Bluff	Alydeed	Casual Lies	Dance Floor	14
1991	Hansel	Corporate Report	Mane Minister	Olympio	8
1990	Summer Squall	Unbridled	Mister Frisky	Music Prospector	9
1989	Sunday Silence	Easy Goer	Rock Point	Dansil	8
1988	Risen Star	Brian's Time	Winning Colors ‡	Private Terms	9
1987	Alysheba	Bet Twice	Cryptoclearance	Gulch	9
1986	Snow Chief	Ferdinand	Broad Brush	Badger Land	7
1985	Tank's Prospect	Chief's Crown	Eternal Prince	I Am The Game	11
1984	Gate Dancer	Play On	Fight Over	Taylor's Special	10
1983	Deputed Testamony	Desert Wine	High Honors	Marfa	12
1982	Aloma's Ruler	Linkage	Cut Away	Bold Style	7
1981	Pleasant Colony	Bold Ego	Paristo	Thirty Eight Paces	13
1980	Codex	Genuine Risk ‡	Colonel Moran	Jaklin Klugman	8
1979	Spectacular Bid	Golden Act	Screen King	Flying Paster	5
1978	**Affirmed †**	Alydar	Believe It	Noon Time Spender	7
1977	**Seattle Slew †**	Iron Constitution	Run Dusty Run	Cormorant	9
1976	Elocutionist	Play the Red	Bold Forbes	Cojak	6
1975	Master Derby	Foolish Pleasure	Diabolo	Prince Thou Art	10
1974	Little Current	Neapolitan Way	Cannonade	Kin Run	13
1973	**Secretariat †**	Sham	Our Native	Ecole Etage	6
1972	Bee Bee Bee	No Le Hace	Key to the Mint	Riva Ridge	7
1971	Canonero II	Eastern Fleet	Jim French	Sound Off	11
1970	Personality	My Dad George	Silent Screen	High Echelon	14
1969	Majestic Prince	Arts and Letters	Jay Ray	Top Knight	8
1968	Forward Pass	Out of the Way	Nodouble	Yankee Lad	10
1967	Damascus	In Reality	Proud Clarion	Reason To Tail	10
1966	Kauai King	Stupendous	Amberoid	Rehabilitate	9
1965	Tom Rolfe	Dapper Dan	Hail To All	Native Charger	9
1964	Northern Dancer	The Scoundrel	Hill Rise	Quadrangle	6
1963	Candy Spots	Chateaugay	Never Bend	Lemon Twist	8
1962	Greek Money	Ridan	Roman Line	Vimy Ridge	11
1961	Carry Back	Globemaster	Crozier	Dr. Miller	9
1960	Bally Ache	Victoria Park	Celtic Ash	Divine Comedy	6
1959	Royal Orbit	Sword Dancer	Dunce	Marauder	11
1958	Tim Tam	Lincoln Road	Gone Fishin'	Plion	12
1957	Bold Ruler	Iron Liege	Inside Tract	Promised Land	7
1956	Fabius	Needles	No Regrets	Golf Ace	9
1955	Nashua	Saratoga	Traffic Judge	Nance's Lad	8
1954	Hasty Road	Correlation	Hasseyampa	Goyamo	11
1953	Native Dancer	Jamie K.	Royal Bay Gem	Ram O' War	7
1952	Blue Man	Jampol	One Count	Primate	10
1951	Bold	Counterpoint	Alerted	Timely Reward	8
1950	Hill Prince	Middleground	Dooly	Mr. Trouble	6
1949	Capot	Palestinian	Noble Impulse	Sun Bahram	9
1948	**Citation †**	Vulcan's Forge	Bovard	Better Self	4
1947	Faultless	On Trust	Phalanx	Jet Pilot	11
1946	**Assault †**	Lord Boswell	Hampden	Knockdown	10
1945	Polynesian	Hoop Jr.	Darby Dieppe	The Doge	9
1944	Pensive	Platter	Stir Up	Gramps Image	7
1943	**Count Fleet †**	Blue Swords	Vincentive	New Moon	4
1942	Alsab	Requested	Sun Again	Colchis	10
1941	**Whirlaway †**	King Cole	Our Boots	Porter's Cap	8
1940	Bimelech	Mioland	Gallahadion	Your Chance	9
1939	Challedon	Gilded Knight	Volitant	Impound	6
1938	Dauber	Cravat	Menow	Can't Wait	9
1937	**War Admiral †**	Pompoon	Flying Scot	Mosawtre	8
1936	Bold Venture	Granville	Jean Bart	Transporter	11
1935	**Omaha †**	Firethorn	Psychic Bid	Mantagna	8
1934	High Quest	Cavalcade	Discovery	Agrarian	7
1933	Head Play	Ladysman	Utopian	Pomponius	10
1932	Burgoo King	Tick On	Boatswain	Mad Pursuit	9
1931	Mate	Twenty Grand	Ladder	Equipose	7
1930	**Gallant Fox †**	Crack Brigade	Snowflake	Michigan Boy	11
1929	Dr. Freeland	Minotaur	African	The Nut	11
1928	Victorian	Toro	Solace	Stroling Player	18
1927	Bostonian	Sir Harry	Whiskery	Black Panther	12
1926	Display	Blondin	Mars	Dress Parade	13
1925	Coventry	Backbone	Almadel	Chantey	12
1924	Nellie Morse ‡	Transmute	Mad Play	Donaghee	15
1923	Vigil	General Thatcher	Rialto	Chickvale	13
1922	Pillory	Hea	June Grass	Pirate Gold	12
1921	Broomspun	Polly Ann ‡	Jeg	Leonardo II	14
1920	Man o' War	Upset	Wildair	King Thrush	9
1919	**Sir Barton †**	Eternal	Sweep On	King Plaudit	12
1918	Jack Hare, Jr.	The Porter	Kate Bright	Trompe La Mort	10
1918	War Cloud	Sunny Slope	Lanius	Johren	14
1917	Kalitan	Al. M. Dick	Kentucky Boy	Fruit Cake	9
1916	Damrosch	Greenwood	Achievement	Eddie Henry	9
1915	Rhein Maiden ‡	Half Rock	Runes	Hauberk	6
1914	Holiday	Brave Cunarder	Defendum	The Governor	6
1913	Buskin	Kleburne	Barnegat	Scallywag	8
1912	Colonel Holloway	Bwana Tumbo	Tipsand	Jannette B.	7
1911	Watervale	Zeus	The Nigger	Footprint	7
1910	Layminster	Dalhousie	Sager	Starbottle	12
1909	Effendi	Fashion Plate	Hill Top	Traveller	10
1908	Royal Tourist	Live Wire	Robert Cooper	Creation	4
1907	Don Enrique	Ethon	Zambesi	Don Creole	7
1906	Whimsical ‡	Content	Larabie	The Clown	10
1905	Cairngorm	Kiamesha	Coy Maid	Water Light	10
1904	Bryn Mawr	Wotan	Dolly Spanker	Careless	10
1903	Flocarline ‡	Mackey Dwyer	Rightful	St. Daniel	6
1902	Old England	Major Daingerfield	Namtor	Bonmot	7
1901	The Parader	Sadie S.	Dr. Barlow	Outlander	5
1900	Hindus	Sarmatian	Ten Candles	Col. Roosevelt	10
1899	Half Time	Filigrane	Lackland	none	3
1898	Sly Fox	The Huguenot	Nuto	Lydian	4
1897	Paul Kauvar	Elkin	On Deck	Free Lance	7
1896	Margrave	Hamilton II	Intermission	Cassette	4
1895	Belmar	April Fool	Sue Kittie	Mirage	7
1894	Assignee	Potentate	Ed Kearney	Sir Knight	14
1893	No Race	No Race	No Race	No Race	0
1892	No Race	No Race	No Race	No Race	0
1891	No Race	No Race	No Race	No Race	0
1890	Montague	Philosophy	Barrister	Ten Booker	4
1889	Buddhist	Japhet	none	none	2
1888	Refund	Judge Murray	Glendale	Charley Dreux	4
1887	Dunboyne	Mahony	Raymond	Paymaster	4
1886	The Bard	Eurus	Elkwood	Eolian	5
1885	Tecumseh	Wickham	John C.	Longview	4
1884	Knight of Ellerslie	Welcher	none	none	2
1883	Jacobus	Parnell	none	none	2
1882	Vanguard	Heck	Col. Watson	none	3
1881	Saunterer	Compensation	Baltic	Jack of Hearts	6
1880	Grenada	Oden	Emily F.	Turfman	5
1879	Harold	Jerico	Rochester	Boardman	6
1878	Duke of Magenta	Bayard	Albert	none	3
1877	Cloverbrook	Bombast	Lucifer	The Stranger	4
1876	Shirley	Rappahannock	Compliments	Algerine	8
1875	Tom Ochiltree	Viator	Bay Final	Risk	9
1874	Culpepper	King Amadeus	Scratch	Huckleberry	6
1873	Survivor	John Boulger	Artist	Catesby	7

A † designates a Triple Crown Winner.
A ‡ designates a Filly.
Note: D. Wayne Lukas swept the 1995 Triple Crown with two different horses.
