= 1957 Preakness Stakes =

82nd running of the Preakness Stakes

82nd Preakness Stakes
- The Preakness Stakes
- Location: Pimlico Race Course, Baltimore, Maryland, United States
- Date: May 18, 1957
- Winning horse: Bold Ruler
- Jockey: Eddie Arcaro
- Conditions: Fast
- Surface: Dirt

The 1957 Preakness Stakes was the 82nd running of the $120,000 Preakness Stakes thoroughbred horse race. The race took place on May 18, 1957, and was televised in the United States on the CBS television network. Bold Ruler, who was jockeyed by Eddie Arcaro, won the race by one and one half lengths over runner-up Iron Liege. Approximate post time was 5:48 p.m. Eastern Time. The race was run on a fast track in a final time of 1:561/5 The Maryland Jockey Club reported total attendance of 32,856, this is recorded as second highest on the list of American thoroughbred racing top attended events for North America in 1957.

== Payout ==
The 82nd Preakness Stakes Payout Schedule

Program Number	Horse Name	Win	Place	Show
5	Bold Ruler	$4.80	$2.60	$2.40
4	Iron Liege	-	$2.40	$2.20
6	Inside Tract	-	-	$4.00

== The full chart ==
Finish Position	Margin (lengths)	Post Position	Horse name	Jockey	Trainer	Owner	Post Time Odds	Purse Earnings
1st	0	5	Bold Ruler	Eddie Arcaro	James E. Fitzsimmons	Wheatley Stable	1.40-1	$66,300
2nd	2	4	Iron Liege	Bill Hartack	Jimmy Jones	Calumet Farm	1.30-1 favorite	$25,000
3rd	21/4	6	Inside Tract	Eldon Nelson	John J. Weipert Jr.	D & M Stable (Raymond da Brino & Joseph Martino)	53.90-1	$15,000
4th	41/2	2	Promised Land	Ted Atkinson	Hirsch Jacobs	Ethel D. Jacobs	19.90-1	$5,000
5th	73/4	3	Nah Hiss	Robert Ussery	Chester Ross	Mrs. Jules Schwartz	16.30-1	
6th	143/4	1	Inswept	Joe Culmone	Frank A. Bonsal	Roslyn Farm	20.60-1	
7th	263/4	7	Federal Hill	Willie Carstens	Milton Rieser	Clifford Lussky	7.00-1	

- Winning Breeder: Wheatley Stable; (KY)
- Winning Time: 1:56 1/5
- Track Condition: Fast
- Total Attendance: 32,856
