= 1967 Preakness Stakes =

92nd running of the Preakness Stakes

92nd Preakness Stakes
- The Preakness Stakes
- Location: Pimlico Race Course, Baltimore, Maryland, United States
- Date: May 20, 1967
- Winning horse: Damascus
- Jockey: Bill Shoemaker
- Conditions: Fast
- Surface: Dirt

The 1967 Preakness Stakes was the 92nd running of the $200,000 Preakness Stakes thoroughbred horse race. The race took place on May 20, 1967, and was televised in the United States on the CBS television network. Damascus, who was jockeyed by Bill Shoemaker, won the race by two and one quarter lengths over runner-up In Reality. Approximate post time was 5:31 p.m. Eastern Time. The race was run on a fast track in a final time of 1:55-1/5. The Maryland Jockey Club reported total attendance of 38,371, this is recorded as second highest on the list of American thoroughbred racing top attended events for North America in 1967.

== Payout ==
The 92nd Preakness Stakes Payout Schedule

Program Number	Horse Name	Win	Place	Show
1	Damascus	$5.60	$3.60	$2.60
3	In Reality	-	$4.60	$3.60
2	Proud Clarion	-	-	$3.80

== The full chart ==
Finish Position	Margin (lengths)	Post Position	Horse name	Jockey	Trainer	Owner	Post Time Odds	Purse Earnings
1st	0	1	Damascus	Bill Shoemaker	Frank Y. Whiteley Jr.	Edith W. Bancroft	1.80-1 favorite	$151,500
2nd	21/4	3	In Reality	Robert Ussery	Melvin C. Calvert	Frances A. Genter	4.30-1	$30,000
3rd	61/4	2	Proud Clarion	Earlie Fires	Loyd Gentry Jr.	Darby Dan Farm	4.80-1	$15,000
4th	7	10	Reason To Hail	Walter Blum	Hirsch Jacobs	Patrice Jacobs	17.80-1	$7,500
5th	81/2	8	Misty Cloud	Eldon Nelson	James P. Simpson	Richard S. Reynolds Jr.	40.40-1	
6th	9	7	Barb's Delight	Bill Hartack	Henry W. "Hal" Steele Jr.	Gene Spalding	3.20-1	
7th	11	5	Ask The Fare	Johnny Sellers	Jere R. Smith Sr.	Holiday Stable (Mrs. Charles F. Parker)	21.30-1	
8th	111/4	3	Celtic Air	Nick Shuk	Frank Y. Whiteley Jr.	Orme Wilson Jr.	1.80-1	
9th	121/4	4	Favorable Turn	Chuck Baltazar	Eugene Jacobs	Herbert A. Allen Sr.	78.00-1	
10th	221/4	6	Great Power	Braulio Baeza	Edward A. Neloy	Wheatley Stable	16.50-1	

- Winning Breeder: Edith W. Bancroft; (KY)
- Winning Time: 1:55 1/5
- Track Condition: Fast
- Total Attendance: 38,371
