= 1959 Preakness Stakes =

84th running of the Preakness Stakes

84th Preakness Stakes
- The Preakness Stakes
- Location: Pimlico Race Course, Baltimore, Maryland, United States
- Date: May 16, 1959
- Winning horse: Royal Orbit
- Jockey: William Harmatz
- Conditions: Fast
- Surface: Dirt

The 1959 Preakness Stakes was the 84th running of the $200,000 Preakness Stakes thoroughbred horse race. The race took place on May 16, 1959, and was televised in the United States on the CBS television network. Royal Orbit, who was jockeyed by William Harmatz, won the race by four lengths over runner-up Sword Dancer. Approximate post time was 5:47 p.m. Eastern Time. The race was run on a fast track in a final time of 1:57 flat The Maryland Jockey Club reported total attendance of 31,506, this is recorded as second highest on the list of American thoroughbred racing top attended events for North America in 1959.

== Payout ==
The 84th Preakness Stakes Payout Schedule

Program Number	Horse Name	Win	Place	Show
6	Royal Orbit	$15.20	$5.80	$4.20
7	Sword Dancer	-	$3.00	$2.20
9	Dunce	-	-	$4.60

== The full chart ==
Finish Position	Margin (lengths)	Post Position	Horse name	Jockey	Trainer	Owner	Post Time Odds	Purse Earnings
1st	0	6	Royal Orbit	William Harmatz	Reggie Cornell	Halina Gregory Braunstein	6.60-1	$137,800
2nd	4	7	Sword Dancer	Bill Shoemaker	J. Elliott Burch	Brookmeade Stable	1.70-1 favorite	$30,000
3rd	7	9	Dunce	Sam Boulmetis	Moody Jolley	Claiborne Farm	8.30-1	$15,000
4th	9 1/2	1	Marauder	Richard Lawless	Lester R. Robinson	L. G. Robinson	198.20-1	$7,500
5th	11	10	Festival King	Billy Cook	Everett W. Kuykendall	C. B. Fischbach	225.70-1	
6th	12	11	Our Dad	Nick Shuk	John W. Jacobs	Patrice Jacobs	32.20-1	
7th	12 1/2	5	Rico Tesio	Chris Rogers	Joseph Piarulli	Briardale Farm	91.30-1	
8th	14 1/2	3	Manassa Mauler	Ray Broussard	Pancho Martin	Emil Dolce	11.90-1	
9th	15 1/2	2	First Landing	Eddie Arcaro	Casey Hayes	Meadow Stable	1.80-1	
10th	21 1/2	8	Open View	Karl Korte	Raymond F. Metcalf	Elkcam Stable	41.20-1	
11th	22 1/2	4	Sundown II	Larry Adams	Edgar D. Cox	Robert S. Lytle	174.50-1	

- Winning Breeder: Louis B. Mayer; (KY)
- Winning Time: 1:57.00
- Track Condition: Fast
- Total Attendance: 31,506
