= Kegasus =

Mascot

Kegasus was the mascot for the infield party for the 2011 Preakness Stakes, portrayed by a human in a centaur costume. Dubbed "Lord of the InfieldFest", Kegasus borrowed his name from Pegasus and keg. Unlike Pegasus, Kegasus was not a winged horse, but was half man, half horse. The actor who played Kegasus was not disclosed.

The March 2011 announcement of Kegasus as a mascot for the party provoked controversy, with some complaining that the Preakness was glorifying binge drinking. In response, spokesmen for the race noted that the ad campaign was an attempt to appeal to a younger demographic.

== Background ==
The Preakness Stakes at Pimlico Race Course in Baltimore, Maryland, is the second of the three legs of U.S. Thoroughbred racing's Triple Crown and is run each May. In addition to the racing, Preakness Stakes day has long been known to boast a party in the infield within the racetrack. By 2008, the party had become known for such events as the "Run of the Urinals", in which young men would run along the tops of the rows of portapotties as other racegoers threw beer cans, sometimes full, at the participants. Beginning in 2009, racetrack management no longer allowed racegoers to bring in their own alcohol.

In 2009, with the alcohol ban, race attendance dropped to 77,850 after topping 100,000 for eight consecutive years. In 2010, in an attempt to boost attendance, the Preakness launched a controversial ad campaign, "Get Your Preak On" and instituted the "Mug Club", which included an infield ticket and an unlimited-refill beer mug. The track also hired more popular bands than usual to play to the waiting crowds, and ticket sales recovered to 95,760.

== Introduction and appearance ==
Kegasus was introduced March 29, 2011, as the star of the marketing campaign to attract people to the infield party. The centaur was described as a "party manimal", with a nipple ring, body hair and beer gut. The mascot urged racegoers to be "legendary", a term used in place of references to drinking.

The mascot and the campaign were created by the advertising agency Elevation Ltd.; Kegasus was given Facebook and Twitter accounts, as well as a backstory. According to the created tale, Kegasus is the "son of Preaknesius — God of Thoroughbred Racing — and Shelly McDougal, a waitress from Ellicott City." McDougal is also known as the "Lady of the Bottomless Refill". The campaign was summed up with the catchphrase: "A 10-hour party to celebrate a two-minute race. Now you're talking."

== Controversy ==
Kegasus attracted criticism from a number of sources. Upon the announcement, Pat McDonough, a member of the Maryland House of Delegates indicated his disgust with the campaign, stating his view that the mascot is infantile and creates a negative image. According to University of Maryland media professor Jason Loviglio, "If the goal is to let them know they will be able to drink to excess, it does communicate that." According to The New York Times, many viewed the campaign as vulgar.

Maryland Jockey Club President Tom Chukkas noted that "Kegasus speaks directly to our infield fest demographic with his no-nonsense personality and total embodiment of a good time." Chukkas defended the campaign, stating that his organization has "never hidden the fact that we want people to come to the infield and party.
