= Layminster =

American-bred Thoroughbred racehorse

- Sire: Matchless
- Grandsire: Meddler
- Dam: Northmeister
- Damsire: Silurian
- Sex: Colt
- Foaled: 1907
- Country: United States
- Color: Chestnut
- Breeder: Edward B. Cassatt
- Owner: Edward B. Cassatt
- Trainer: J. Simon Healy

Major wins
- Triple Crown Race wins: Preakness Stakes (1910)

Layminster (1907 – after 1913) was an American Thoroughbred racehorse is best known for winning the 1910 Preakness Stakes but at that time the race was run as the Preakness Handicap and he won with a bottom weight of 84 pounds (38 kilograms). Bred and raced by Edward Cassatt, he was sired by Matchless. Layminster was out of the mare Northminster, a daughter of Meddler.

== Preakness Stakes ==
The second running of the Preakness Handicap, additionally added to the list of winners as thirty-fifth running of the 1910 Preakness Stakes was run on Saturday, May 7. On that day Layminster went off as 17-1 longshot in the field of twelve after one scratch. He broke poorly in ninth under jockey Roy Estep but as they hit Pimlico's famous "Clubhouse Turn" he had edged into sixth place. The pace was very fast early in the race that day with the first quarter in 0:23-1/5 seconds and the half in 0:47-4/5. As the race progressed, Layminster raced in mid-pack with a group of stalkers behind the leaders. He made his move on the final turn with some urging from Estep and rounded the field.

Near the top of the lane he passed most of the leaders and wore down front runner Dalhouse. In the last sixteenth of a mile he emerged in front and beat the favorite and now runner-up by only a half length. That day Dalhouse finished second at 6-5 by only another half length back to Sager who finished third at 5-1.

The final time for the one mile race on dirt was 1:40 1/5 over a fast track. This was one of only two years (1909 and 1910) that the Preakness was run at the shorter distance of a mile. The winner's share of the purse was $2,800 and a $500 silver cup trophy.

== Breeding ==
Pedigree of Layminster
Sire Matchless ch. 1900	Meddler bay 1890	St. Gatien	The Rover
Sire Matchless ch. 1900	Meddler bay 1890	St. Gatien	Saint Editha
Sire Matchless ch. 1900	Meddler bay 1890	Busybody	Petrarch
Sire Matchless ch. 1900	Meddler bay 1890	Busybody	Spinaway
Sire Matchless ch. 1900	Equality ch. 1886	Bend Or	Buckden
Sire Matchless ch. 1900	Equality ch. 1886	Bend Or	Kate Walker
Sire Matchless ch. 1900	Equality ch. 1886	Equipoise	Enquirer
Sire Matchless ch. 1900	Equality ch. 1886	Equipoise	Bandana
Dam Northminster ch. 1891	Silurian bay 1887	Wenlock	Lord Clifden
Dam Northminster ch. 1891	Silurian bay 1887	Wenlock	Mineral
Dam Northminster ch. 1891	Silurian bay 1887	Paistre	Wild Dayrell
Dam Northminster ch. 1891	Silurian bay 1887	Paistre	Rupee
Dam Northminster ch. 1891	Queenminster dk.br. 1881	Exminster	Newminster
Dam Northminster ch. 1891	Queenminster dk.br. 1881	Exminster	Stockings
Dam Northminster ch. 1891	Queenminster dk.br. 1881	Queen Bee	Kettledrum
Dam Northminster ch. 1891	Queenminster dk.br. 1881	Queen Bee	Honey Bee
