= 1961 Preakness Stakes =

86th running of the Preakness Stakes

86th Preakness Stakes
- The Preakness Stakes
- Location: Pimlico Race Course, Baltimore, Maryland, United States
- Date: May 20, 1961
- Winning horse: Carry Back
- Jockey: John Sellers
- Conditions: Fast
- Surface: Dirt

The 1961 Preakness Stakes was the 86th running of the $200,000 Preakness Stakes thoroughbred horse race. The race took place on May 20, 1961, and was televised in the United States on the CBS television network. Carry Back, who was jockeyed by John Sellers, won the race by three quarters of a length over runner-up Globemaster. Approximate post time was 5:47 p.m. Eastern Time. The race was run on a fast track in a final time of 1:57-3/5 The Maryland Jockey Club reported total attendance of 32,211, this is recorded as second highest on the list of American thoroughbred racing top attended events for North America in 1961.

== Payout ==
The 86th Preakness Stakes Payout Schedule

Program Number	Horse Name	Win	Place	Show
4	Carry Back	$4.00	$3.20	$2.20
6	Globemaster	-	$8.00	$3.40
3	Crozier	-	-	$2.40

== The full chart ==
Finish Position	Margin (lengths)	Post Position	Horse name	Jockey	Trainer	Owner	Post Time Odds	Purse Earnings
1st	0	4	Carry Back	John Sellers	Jack A. Price	Mrs. Katherine Price	1.00-1 favorite	$135,800
2nd	3/4	6	Globemaster	John L. Rotz	Thomas Kelly	Leonard P. Sasso	8.60-1	$30,000
3rd	43/4	3	Crozier	Braulio Baeza	Julius E. Tinsley Jr.	Fred W. Hooper	3.00-1	$15,000
4th	51/4	9	Dr. Miller	Herb Hinojosa	Hirsch Jacobs	Ethel D. Jacobs	10.90-1	$7,500
5th	91/4	7	Sherluck	Sam Boulmetis	Harold Young	Jacob Sher	15.20-1	
6th	91/2	8	Hitting Away	Robert Ussery	James E. Fitzsimmons	Ogden Phipps	9.20-1	
7th	101/2	2	Nashua Blue	Buck Thornburg	Lloyd Murray	Boncrist Farm	69.40-1	
8th	111/4	5	Orleans Doge	George Hettinger	William J. Resseguet Sr.	Ben Weiner	41.90-1	
9th	171/4	1	Crimson Fury	Willie Carstens	Gordon R. Potter	Crimson King Farm	186.00-1	

- Winning Breeder: Jack A. Price; (KY)
- Winning Time: 1:57 3/5
- Track Condition: Fast
- Total Attendance: 32,211
