= 1986 Preakness Stakes =

111th running of the Preakness Stakes

111th Preakness Stakes
- The Preakness Stakes
- Location: Pimlico Race Course, Baltimore, Maryland, United States
- Date: May 17, 1986
- Winning horse: Snow Chief
- Jockey: Alex Solis
- Conditions: Fast
- Surface: Dirt

The 1986 Preakness Stakes was the 111th running of the Preakness Stakes thoroughbred horse race. The race took place on May 17, 1986, and was televised in the United States on the ABC television network. Snow Chief, who was jockeyed by Alex Solis, won the race by four lengths over runner-up Ferdinand. Approximate post time was 5:41 p.m. Eastern Time. The race was run over a fast track in a final time of 1:54-4/5. The Maryland Jockey Club reported total attendance of 87,652, this is recorded as second highest on the list of American thoroughbred racing top attended events for North America in 1986.

== Payout ==
The 111th Preakness Stakes Payout Schedule

Program Number	Horse Name	Win	Place	Show
3	Snow Chief	US$7.20	$4.80	$3.60
5	Ferdinand	-	$4.80	$3.20
6	Broad Brush	-	-	$3.00

$2 Exacta: (3–5) paid $33.80

== The full chart ==
Finish Position	Margin (lengths)	Post Position	Horse name	Jockey	Trainer	Owner	Post Time Odds	Purse Earnings
1st	0	2	Snow Chief	Alex Solis	Melvin F. Stute	Carl Grinstead	2.60-1	$411,900
2nd	4	5	Ferdinand	Bill Shoemaker	Charles Whittingham	Elizabeth Keck	3.10-1	$70,000
3rd	101/2	6	Broad Brush	Chris McCarron	Richard Small	Robert E. Meyerhoff	3.70-1	$35,000
4th	103/4	7	Badger Land	Jorge Velásquez	D. Wayne Lukas	Jeff Lukas & Mel Hatley	1.80-1 favorite	$17,500
5th	121/4	1	Miracle Wood	Donnie A. Miller Jr.	Allen A. Ferris, III	Albert F. Allen, Jr.	20.70-1	
6th	14	4	Groovy	Craig Perret	Howard Crowell	John A. Ballis & Theodore V. Kruckel	11.10-1	
7th	22	3	Clear Choice	Jacinto Vásquez	D. Wayne Lukas	Eugene V. Klein	1.80-1	

- Winning Breeder: Blue Diamond Ranch; (CA)
- Winning Time: 1:54 4/5
- Track Condition: Fast
- Total Attendance: 87,652

== See also ==
- 1986 Kentucky Derby
