= 1983 Preakness Stakes =

108th running of the Preakness Stakes

108th Preakness Stakes
- The Preakness Stakes
- Location: Pimlico Race Course, Baltimore, Maryland, United States
- Date: May 21, 1983
- Winning horse: Deputed Testamony
- Jockey: Donnie A. Miller Jr.
- Trainer: J. William Boniface
- Owner: Francis P. Sears Jr.
- Conditions: Sloppy
- Surface: Dirt

The 1983 Preakness Stakes was the 108th running of the $350,000 Grade 1 Preakness Stakes thoroughbred horse race. The race took place on May 21, 1983, and was televised in the United States on the ABC television network. Deputed Testamony, who was jockeyed by Donnie A. Miller Jr., won the race by two and three quarter lengths over runner-up Desert Wine. Approximate post time was 5:42 p.m. Eastern Time. The race was run on a sloppy track in a final time of 1:55-2/5. The Maryland Jockey Club reported total attendance of 71,768, recorded as second highest on the list of American thoroughbred racing top attended events in 1983.

== Payout ==
The 108th Preakness Stakes Payout Schedule

Program Number	Horse Name	Win	Place	Show
1	Deputed Testamony	US$31.00	$10.00	$6.40
7	Desert Wine	-	$4.80	$4.20
3	High Honors	-	-	$9.60

$2 Exacta: (1–7) paid $174.60

== The full chart ==
Finish Position	Margin (lengths)	Post Position	Horse name	Jockey	Trainer	Owner	Post Time Odds	Purse Earnings
1st	0	1	Deputed Testamony	Donnie A. Miller Jr.	J. William Boniface	Francis P. Sears Jr.	14.50-1	$251,200
2nd	2-3/4	7	Desert Wine	Chris McCarron	Jerry M. Fanning	Cardiff Stud Farm	4.40-1	$50,000
3rd	6-3/4	3	High Honors	Miguel A. Rivera	Lou Rondinello	Daniel M. Galbreath	15.70-1	$30,000
4th	81/2	6	Marfa	Jorge Velásquez	D. Wayne Lukas	Lloyd R. French & Barry Beal	4.50-1	$15,000
5th	83/4	2	Play Fellow	Jean Cruguet	Harvey L. Vanier	Nancy A. Vanier	8.30-1	
6th	111/2	10	Sunny's Halo	Eddie Delahoussaye	David C. Cross Jr.	David J. Foster Racing	1.10-1 favorite	
7th	14	5	Bet Big	Roger I. Velez	Hubert Hine	Zelda Cohen	20.40-1	
8th	15	1A	Parfaitement	Herb McCauley	J. William Boniface	Mrs. Bernard Daney	14.50-1	
9th	153/4	9	Common Sense	Jack C. Penny	Dennis J. Manning	J & L Stable	47.10-1	
10th	193/4	11	Flag Admiral	Pat Day	Ambrose R. Cremen	Carter & Gentry	26.10-1	
11th	233/4	4	Chas Conerly	Kenneth Skinner	Mervin Marks	Daniel H. Lavezzo Jr.	68.20-1	
12th	303/4	8	Paris Prince	Terry Liphan	Laz Barrera	Dolly Green	47.80-1	

- Winning Breeder: Bonita Farm, (MD)
- Winning Time: 1:55 2/5
- Track Condition: Sloppy
- Total Attendance: 71,768
