= 1969 Preakness Stakes =

94th running of the Preakness Stakes

94th Preakness Stakes
- The Preakness Stakes
- Location: Pimlico Race Course, Baltimore, Maryland, United States
- Date: May 17, 1969
- Winning horse: Majestic Prince
- Jockey: Bill Hartack
- Conditions: Fast
- Surface: Dirt

The 1969 Preakness Stakes was the 94th running of the $200,000 Preakness Stakes thoroughbred horse race. The race took place on May 17, 1969, and was televised in the United States on the CBS television network. Majestic Prince, who was jockeyed by Bill Hartack, won the race by only a neck over runner-up Arts and Letters. Approximate post time was 5:40 p.m. Eastern Time. The race was run on a fast track in a final time of 1:55-3/5. flat. The Maryland Jockey Club reported total attendance of 42,258, this is recorded as second highest on the list of American thoroughbred racing top attended events for North America in 1969.

== Payout ==
The 94th Preakness Stakes Payout Schedule

Program Number	Horse Name	Win	Place	Show
5	Majestic Prince	$3.20	$2.40	$2.20
6	Arts and Letters	-	$3.20	$2.60
4	Jay Ray	-	-	$4.40

== The full chart ==
Finish Position	Margin (lengths)	Post Position	Horse name	Jockey	Trainer	Owner	Post Time Odds	Purse Earnings
1st	0	5	Majestic Prince	Bill Hartack	Johnny Longden	Frank M. McMahon	0.60-1 favorite	$129,500
2nd	head	6	Arts and Letters	Braulio Baeza	J. Elliott Burch	Rokeby Stable	5.00-1	$30,000
3rd	41/4	4	Jay Ray	Earlie Fires	Lucien Laurin	Claiborne Farm	34.40-1	$15,000
4th	81/4	1	Top Knight	Manuel Ycaza	Raymond F. Metcalf	Steven B. Wilson	2.90-1	$7,500
5th	111/4	7	Al Hattab	Ray Broussard	Warren A. Croll, Jr.	Pelican Stable	18.60-1	
6th	111/2	8	Greengrass Greene	George Cusimano	Del W. Carroll	Michael G. Phipps	66.20-1	
7th	171/2	2	Captain Action	Kenny Knapp	James P. Conway	Elmendorf Farm	36.10-1	
8th	231/2	3	Glad's Flame	R. J. Wilson	Richard Wesselman	Glenn M. Banker	95.80-1	

- Winning Breeder: Leslie Combs II; (KY)
- Winning Time: 1:55 3/5
- Track Condition: Fast
- Total Attendance: 42,258
