= 1956 Preakness Stakes =

81st running of the Preakness Stakes

81st Preakness Stakes
- The Preakness Stakes
- Location: Pimlico Race Course, Baltimore, Maryland, United States
- Date: May 19, 1956
- Winning horse: Fabius
- Jockey: William Hartack
- Conditions: Fast
- Surface: Dirt

The 1956 Preakness Stakes was the 81st running of the $135,000 Preakness Stakes thoroughbred horse race. The race took place on May 19, 1956, and was televised on the CBS television network in the United States. Fabius, who was jockeyed by William Hartack, won the race by one and three quarter lengths over runner-up Needles. Approximate post time was 5:46 p.m. Eastern Time. The race was run on a fast track in a final time of 1:582/5 The Maryland Jockey Club reported total attendance of 30,714. This is recorded as the second highest on the list of American thoroughbred racing top attended events for North America in 1956. It was also the first year Pimlico Race Course began recording attendance figures.

== Payout ==
The 81st Preakness Stakes Payout Schedule

Program Number	Horse Name	Win	Place	Show
3	Fabius	$7.00	$2.40	$2.40
6	Needles	-	$2.20	$2.20
5	Inside Tract	-	-	$5.60

== The full chart ==
Finish Position	Margin (lengths)	Post Position	Horse	Jockey	Trainer	Owner	Post Time Odds	Purse Earnings
1st	0	3	Fabius	William Hartack	Jimmy Jones	Calumet Farm	2.50-1	$84,250
2nd	13/4	6	Needles	David Erb	Hugh L. Fontaine	D. & H. Stable (Jack Dudley & Bonnie Heath)	0.60-1 favorite	$25,000
3rd	23/4	5	No Regrets	Douglas Dodson	Richard T. Waggoner	Wallace E. Britt	61.40-1	$15,000
4th	81/4	7	Golf Ace	Nick Shuk	William G. Williams	Winding Way Farm	24.40-1	$7,500
5th	83/4	8	Count Chic	William Boland	Lloyd A. Lawson	Dino A. Lozzi	11.70-1	
6th	91/2	2	Eiffel Blue	Paul J. Bailey	A. G. (Bob) Robertson	Danny G. Arnstein	24.00-1	
7th	93/4	4	Come On Red	Alfred Popara	Odie Clelland	Helen W. Kellogg	21.10-1	
8th	121/4	1	Ratheram	William M. Cook	Abelard Lamoureux	Harvey C. Fruehauf	56.50-1	
9th	221/4	9	Fleet Peet	William Zakoor	Abelard Lamoureux	Harvey C. Fruehauf	56.50-1	

- Winning Breeder: Calumet Farm; (KY)
- Winning Time: 1:58 2/5
- Track Condition: Fast
- Total Attendance: 30,714
