= 1988 Preakness Stakes =

113th running of the Preakness Stakes

113th Preakness Stakes
- Preakness Stakes
- Location: Pimlico Race Course, Baltimore, Maryland, United States
- Date: May 21, 1988
- Winning horse: Risen Star
- Jockey: Eddie Delahoussaye
- Conditions: Fast
- Surface: Dirt

The 1988 Preakness Stakes was the 113th running of the Preakness Stakes thoroughbred horse race. The race took place on May 21, 1988, and was televised in the United States on the ABC television network. Risen Star, who was jockeyed by Eddie Delahoussaye, won the race by one and one quarter lengths over runner-up Brian's Time. Approximate post time was 5:34 p.m. Eastern Time. The race was run over a fast track in a final time of 1:56-1/5. The Maryland Jockey Club reported total attendance of 88,654, this is recorded as second highest on the list of American thoroughbred racing top attended events for North America in 1988.

== Payout ==
The 113th Preakness Stakes Payout Schedule

Program number	Horse name	Win	Place	Show
4	Risen Star	US$15.60	$7.80	$4.00
7	Brian's Time	-	$6.40	$3.60
6	Winning Colors	–	–	$3.40

$2 Exacta: (4–7) paid $93.80

== The full chart ==
Finish position	Margin (lengths)	Post position	Horse name	Jockey	Trainer	Owner	Post time odds	Purse earnings
1st	0	4	Risen Star	Eddie Delahoussaye	Louie J. Roussel III	Louie J. Roussel III	6.80-1	$438,230
2nd	11/4	7	Brian's Time	Ángel Cordero Jr.	John Veitch	Joan Phipps	7.00-1	$134,840
3rd	21/2	6	Winning Colors	Gary Stevens	D. Wayne Lukas	Eugene V. Klein	1.90-1 favorite	$67,420
4th	5	7	Private Terms	Chris Antley	Charles H. Hadry	Locust Hill Farm	3.00-1	$33,700
5th	51/2	1	Cefis	Eddie Maple	Woody Stephens	Ryan J. Kirkham	43.50-1	
6th	53/4	2	Regal Classic	John Velazquez	James E. Day	Sam-Son Farm	28.90-1	
7th	141/4	4	Forty Niner	Pat Day	Woody Stephens	Claiborne Farm	2.30-1	
8th	231/4	9	Sorry About That	Randy Romero	Hubert Hine	Carolyn Hine	53.70-1	
9th	273/4	8	Finder's Choice	Kent Desormeaux	Charles H. Hadry	Locust Hill Farm	3.00-1	

- Winning Breeder: Arthur B. Hancock III; (KY)
- Final Time: 1:56.20
- Track Condition: Fast
- Total Attendance: 86,106

== See also ==
- 1988 Kentucky Derby
