= 1985 Preakness Stakes =

110th running of the Preakness Stakes

110th Preakness Stakes
- The Preakness Stakes
- Location: Pimlico Race Course, Baltimore, Maryland, United States
- Date: May 18, 1985
- Winning horse: Tank's Prospect
- Jockey: Pat Day
- Conditions: Fast
- Surface: Dirt

The 1985 Preakness Stakes was the 110th running of the Preakness Stakes thoroughbred horse race. The race took place on May 18, 1985, and was televised in the United States on the ABC television network. Tank's Prospect, who was jockeyed by Pat Day, won the race by a head over runner-up and favorite Chief's Crown. Approximate post time was 5:41 p.m. Eastern Time. The race was run over a fast track in a final time of 1:53-2/5. The Maryland Jockey Club reported total attendance of 81,235, this is recorded as second highest on the list of American thoroughbred racing top attended events for North America in 1984.

== Payout ==
The 110th Preakness Stakes Payout Schedule

Program Number	Horse Name	Win	Place	Show
6	Tank's Prospect	$11.40	$3.40	$3.00
3	Chief's Crown	-	$2.60	$2.40
4	Eternal Prince	-	-	$3.20

$2 Exacta: (6–3) paid $24.40

== The full chart ==
Finish Position	Margin (lengths)	Post Position	Horse name	Jockey	Trainer	Owner	Post Time Odds	Purse Earnings
1st	0	6	Tank's Prospect	Pat Day	D. Wayne Lukas	Eugene V. Klein	4.70-1	$423,200
2nd	head	3	Chief's Crown	Don MacBeth	Roger Laurin	Star Crown Stable	1.00-1 favorite	$70,000
3rd	23/4	4	Eternal Prince	Chris McCarron	John J. Lenzini Jr.	Brian Hurst & G. Steinbrenner	2.30-1	$35,000
4th	53/4	5	I Am the Game	Donnie A. Miller Jr.	King T. Leatherbury	Leatherbury & Mandjuris	14.60-1	$17,500
5th	111/4	8	Cutlass Reality	Vincent Bracciale Jr.	Mervin Marks	Theodore V. Kruckel, Jr.	74.30-1	
6th	12	2	Tajawa	Patricia Cooksey	Keith York	Triple A Stable	48.30-1	
7th	15	1	Southern Sultan	James Terry	Ross R. Pearce	Buckland Farm	61.90-1	
8th	18	9	Sparrowvon	Wayne A. Barnett	Hank Allen	Jacque-Scott Stable	43.40-1	
9th	191/4	10	Skip Trial	Chris Antley	Hubert Hine	Zelda Cohen	17.20-1	
10th	301/4	4	Sport Jet	Ronald D. Allen, Jr.	Daniel Perlsweig	Elmer W. Reiber	49.80-1	
11th	49	11	Haji's Treasure	Joseph C. Judice	Monty Jackson	Hajji Farm	24.30-1	

- Winning Breeder: Edward A. Seltzer; (KY)
- Winning Time: 1:53 2/5
- Track Condition: Fast
- Total Attendance: 81,235

== See also ==
- 1985 Kentucky Derby
