= 1929 Preakness Stakes =

54th running of the Preakness Stakes

54th Preakness Stakes
- The Preakness Stakes
- Location: Pimlico Race Course; Baltimore, Maryland, U.S.
- Date: May 10, 1929
- Distance: 1 3/16 mi (9.5 furlongs; 1,900 m)
- Winning horse: Dr. Freeland
- Winning time: 2:01 3/5
- Final odds: 3.85-1
- Jockey: Louis Schaefer
- Trainer: Thomas J. Healey
- Owner: Walter J. Salmon Sr.
- Conditions: Fast
- Surface: Dirt

The 1929 Preakness Stakes was the 54th running of the $62,325 Preakness Stakes horse race for three-year-old Thoroughbreds. The race took place on May 10, 1929, and was run 8 days before the Kentucky Derby. Ridden by Louis Schaefer, Dr. Freeland won the race by one length over runner-up Minotaur. The race was run on a track rated fast in a final time of 2:01 3/5.

== Payout ==
The 54th Preakness Stakes Payout Schedule

Program Number	Horse Name	Win	Place	Show
5	Dr. Freeland	$9.70	$5.60	$6.10
9	Minotaur	-	$11.40	$8.30
10	African			$6.10

== The full chart ==
Daily Racing Form charts:

Finish Position	Margin (lengths)	Post Position	Horse name	Jockey	Trainer	Owner	Post Time Odds	Purse Earnings
1st	0	6	Dr. Freeland	Louis Schaefer	Thomas J. Healey	Walter J. Salmon Sr.	3.85-1 †	$52,325
2nd	1	8	Minotaur	Floyd Halbert	Charles Graffagnini	John R. Thompson Jr.	12.20-1	$5,000
3rd	1	5	African	Roger Leonard	Thomas J. Healey	Richard T. Wilson, Jr.	3.85-1 †	$3,000
4th	1	3	The Nut	Albert Johnson	Joe Notter	Warm Stable	6.05-1	$2,000
5th	2	10	Beacon Hill	Raymond Workman	James G. Rowe Jr.	Harry Payne Whitney	6.50-1	
6th	½	2	Folking	Pete Walls	George L. Arvin	H. Teller Archibald	42.15-1	
7th	HD	1	Grey Coat	Steve O'Donnell	William M. Garth	Samuel Ross	8.20-1	
8th	3	7	Essare	Mack Garner	Joe Johnson	Jacques Stable	9.05-1	
9th	1	4	Leucite	Frank Catrone	John Lowe	Rancocas Stable	15.70-1	
10th	HD	11	Soul of Honor	George Fields	Robert A. Smith	Audley Farm Stable	8.95-1	
11th	25	9	Hermitage	Earl Sande	Earl Sande	Earl Sande	8.35-1	

- † coupled
- Winning Breeder: Mereworth Stud; (KY)
- Times: 1/4 mile – 0:23 4/5; 1/2 mile – 48 3/5; 3/4 mile – 1:13 4/5; mile – 1:40 2/5; 1 3/16 (final) – 2:01.3/5
- Track Condition: Fast
