= 1964 Preakness Stakes =

89th running of the Preakness Stakes

89th Preakness Stakes
- The Preakness Stakes
- Location: Pimlico Race Course, Baltimore, Maryland, United States
- Date: May 16, 1964
- Winning horse: Northern Dancer
- Winning time: 1:56 4/5
- Jockey: Bill Hartack
- Trainer: Horatio Luro
- Owner: E. P. Taylor
- Conditions: Three-year-olds
- Surface: Dirt

The 1964 Preakness Stakes was the 89th running of the $200,000 Preakness Stakes thoroughbred horse race. The race took place on May 16, 1964, and was televised in the United States on the CBS television network. Northern Dancer, who was jockeyed by Bill Hartack, won the race by two and one quarter lengths over runner-up The Scoundrel. Approximate post time was 5:47 p.m. Eastern Time. The race was run on a fast track in a final time of 1:56-4/5. The Maryland Jockey Club reported total attendance of 35,975, this is recorded as second highest on the list of American thoroughbred racing top attended events for North America in 1964.

== Payout ==
The 89th Preakness Stakes Payout Schedule

Program Number	Horse Name	Win	Place	Show
4	Northern Dancer	$6.20	$3.60	$2.20
5	The Scoundrel	-	$6.20	$2.20
6	Hill Rise	-	-	$2.20

== The full chart ==
Finish Position	Margin (lengths)	Post Position	Horse name	Jockey	Trainer	Owner	Post Time Odds	Purse Earnings
1st	0	4	Northern Dancer	Bill Hartack	Horatio Luro	Windfields Farm	2.10-1	$124,200
2nd	21/4	5	The Scoundrel	Henry E. Moreno	Mesh Tenney	Rex C. Ellsworth	9.20-1	$30,000
3rd	21/2	6	Hill Rise	Bill Shoemaker	William B. Finnegan	El Peco Ranch	0.80-1 favorite	$15,000
4th	3	3	Quadrangle	Braulio Baeza	J. Elliott Burch	Rokeby Stables	7.70-1	$7,500
5th	6	2	Roman Brother	Wayne Chambers	Burley Parke	Harbor View Farm	25.40-1	
6th	26	1	Big Pete	Joe Culmone	Bernard P. Bond	Harriet N. Ball	32.10-1	

- Winning Breeder: E. P. Taylor; (CAN)
- Winning Time: 1:56 4/5
- Track Condition: Fast
- Total Attendance: 35,975
