= Preakness Stakes =

American stakes race for Thoroughbreds, part of the Triple Crown

- Previous: 2026 Preakness Stakes; May 16, 2026; Next: 2027 Preakness Stakes; May 23, 2027
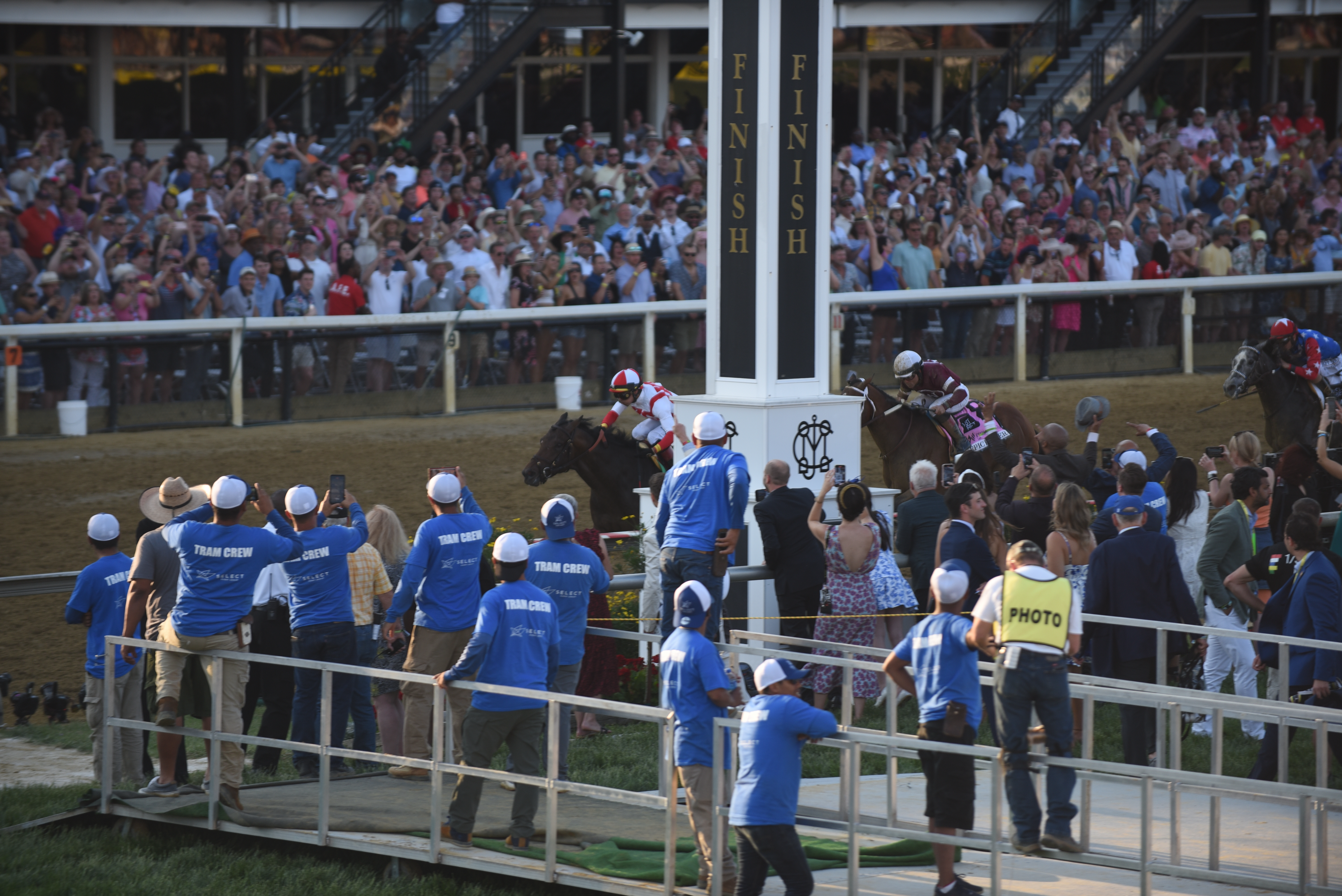
- "The Middle Jewel of the Triple Crown" "The Run for the Black-Eyed Susans"
- Class: Grade I
- Location: Pimlico Race Course; Baltimore, Maryland, U.S.
- Inaugurated: May 27, 1873 (153 years ago)
- Race type: Flat / Thoroughbred
- Website: www.preakness.com

Race information
- Distance: 1 3/16 miles (9.5 furlongs; 1.9 km)
- Record: 1:53.0, Secretariat (1973) more
- Track: Left-handed
- Qualification: 3-year-old
- Weight: Colt/Gelding: 126 pounds (57 kg); Filly: 121 pounds (55 kg)
- Purse: US$2 million (2024); 1st: $1.2 million

The Preakness Stakes is an American thoroughbred horse race traditionally held annually on the third Saturday in May at Pimlico Race Course in Baltimore, Maryland. The Preakness Stakes is a Grade I race run over a distance of 1 3/16 miles (9.5 furlongs; 1.9 kilometers) on dirt. Colts and geldings carry 126 pounds (57 kg); fillies 121 pounds (55 kg). It is the second jewel (or leg) of the Triple Crown, held three weeks and one day after the Kentucky Derby and two weeks before the Belmont Stakes.

First run in 1873, the Preakness Stakes was named by Maryland governor Oden Bowie after the colt who won the first Dinner Party Stakes at Pimlico. Annual "Preakness Weekend" races include both the Saturday Preakness Stakes and a Grade II race on Friday for fillies only named the Black-Eyed Susan Stakes. Attendance at the Preakness Stakes ranks second in North America among equestrian events, surpassed only by the Kentucky Derby.

The 151st running of the Preakness Stakes was held on Saturday, May 16, 2026, with Napoleon Solo winning the race. It was moved to Laurel Park amid Pimlico's reconstruction. The 152nd running will be held on a Sunday — May 23, 2027 — in part to accommodate that year's Black-Eyed Susan Stakes being run on the Saturday instead of the Friday.

== History ==
Two years before the Kentucky Derby was run for the first time, Pimlico introduced its new stakes race for three-year-olds, the Preakness, during its first spring race meet in 1873. Then Maryland governor Oden Bowie named the then mile and one-half (2.41 km) race in honor of the colt Preakness from Milton Holbrook Sanford's Preakness Stud in Preakness, Wayne Township, New Jersey, who won the Dinner Party Stakes on the day Pimlico opened (October 25, 1870). The New Jersey name was said to have come from the Native American name Pra-qua-les ("Quail Woods") for the area. After Preakness won the Dinner Party Stakes, his jockey, Billy Hayward, untied a silk bag of gold coins that hung from a wire stretched across the track from the judges' stand. This was the supposed way that the "wire" at the finish line was introduced and how the awarding of "purse" money came to be. In reality, the term "purse", meaning prize money, had been in use for well over a century.

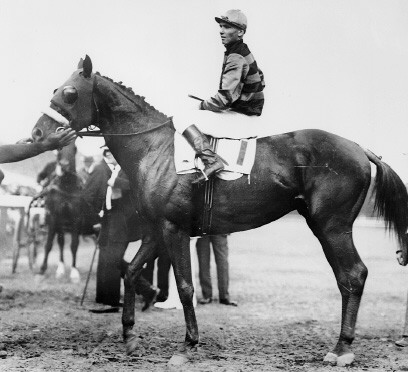
Sir Barton, winner in 1919

The first Preakness, held on May 27, 1873, drew seven starters. John Chamberlain's three-year-old, Survivor, collected the $2,050 winning purse by galloping home easily by 10 lengths. This was the largest margin of victory until 2004, when Smarty Jones won by 11 1/2 lengths.

In 1890, Morris Park Racecourse in The Bronx, New York, hosted the Preakness Stakes. This race was run under handicap conditions, and the age restriction was lifted. The race was won by a five-year-old horse named Montague. After 1890, there was no race run for three years. For the 15 years from 1894 through 1908, the race was held at Gravesend Race Track on Coney Island, New York. In 1909 it returned to Pimlico.

Seven editions of the Preakness Stakes have been run under handicap conditions, in which more accomplished or favored horses are assigned to carry heavier weight. It was first run under these conditions in 1890 and again in the years 1910–1915. During these years, the race was known as the Preakness Handicap.

In March 2009 Magna Entertainment Corp., which owns Pimlico, filed for Chapter 11 bankruptcy thus throwing open the possibility the Stakes could move again. On April 13, 2009, the Maryland Legislature approved a plan to buy the Stakes and the Pimlico course if Magna Entertainment could not find a buyer.

Attendance at the Preakness Stakes ranks second in North America and usually surpasses the attendance of all other stakes races including the Belmont Stakes, the Breeders' Cup and the Kentucky Oaks. The attendance of the Preakness Stakes typically only trails the Kentucky Derby. For more information see American thoroughbred racing top attended events.

In February 2017, the Maryland Stadium Authority released the first phase of a study saying that Pimlico needed $250 million in renovations. As of May of that year, no one showed interest in financing the work. The Stronach Group, owner of Pimlico Race Course and Laurel Park, was only interested in moving the Preakness Stakes to Laurel Park unless someone else financed work on Pimlico.

In October 2019, The Stronach Group reached an agreement in principle with the city of Baltimore and groups representing Maryland horsemen that would permanently keep the Preakness at Pimlico. As part of the agreement, Pimlico's grandstand would be demolished and replaced with a smaller structure, and temporary seating would be added to handle the attendance during Preakness week. The Racing and Community Development Act, approved by the Maryland state legislature in May 2020, allows the Maryland Stadium Authority to issue $375 million in bonds for the renovation of both Stronach Group tracks.

The 145th running of the Preakness Stakes was held on Saturday, October 3, 2020, a delay resulting from the COVID-19 outbreak earlier in the year, and setting the year's contest four weeks after the also-delayed Kentucky Derby. It was held without spectators for health reasons because of the outbreak.

In April 2024, the Maryland General Assembly approved a bill that would consolidate Maryland thoroughbred racing at Pimlico and provide for the reconstruction of the Pimlico facility. As part of the initiative, a state board approved a $14.3 million contract to begin demolishing and redeveloping the outdated Pimlico Race Course. As a result of the planned reconstruction of the Pimlico grandstand, the Preakness Stakes will be temporarily relocated to Laurel Park in 2026, with a return to Pimlico scheduled for 2027.

In January 2025 management of thoroughbred racing in Maryland changed from the Stronach Group to the newly-formed, state-owned Maryland Thoroughbred Racetrack Operating Authority (MTROA). The Stronach Group retained intellectual ownership of the Preakness, for which the MTROA pays an annual licensing fee.

In April 2026, Churchill Downs Incorporated (whose Churchill Downs property is home to the Kentucky Derby) announced that they had acquired the intellectual rights to the Preakness Stakes and Black-Eyed Susan Stakes from The Stronach Group for $85 million. Following the announcement of the deal, the Maryland Jockey Club (now a non-profit entity of the MTROA) announced that they would retain operational control, licensing and media rights to the race. In June 2026 the state of Maryland exercised its right of first refusal under state law, matching Churchill Downs' $85 million offer and giving the state the right to use the Preakness and Black-Eyed Susan name and branding.

== Evolution of the Triple Crown series ==
The Preakness is the second leg in American thoroughbred racing's Triple Crown series and almost always attracts the Kentucky Derby winner, some of the other horses that ran in the Derby, and often a few horses that did not start in the Derby. The Preakness is 1 3/16 miles, or 9 1/2 furlongs (1.88 km), compared to the Kentucky Derby, which is 1 1/4 miles / 10 furlongs (2 km). It is followed by the third leg, the Belmont Stakes, which is 1 1/2 miles / 12 furlongs (2.4 km).

Since 1932, the order of Triple Crown races has the Kentucky Derby first, followed by the Preakness Stakes and then the Belmont Stakes. Prior to 1932, the Preakness was run before the Derby eleven times. On May 12, 1917, and again on May 13, 1922, the Preakness and the Derby were run on the same day.

Until 2027, the Preakness was run on the third Saturday in May, two weeks after the Kentucky Derby, and three weeks before the Belmont Stakes. Consequently, the race was run no earlier than May 15, and no later than May 21. One exception was 2020, as that race was run in early October due to the COVID-19 pandemic.

On August 5, 2026, officials announced that the date of the Preakness would be moved to the fourth Sunday in May, three weeks after the Kentucky Derby and two weeks before the Belmont Stakes. The date was moved to incentivize trainers who run horses in the Derby to also run their horses in the Preakness, especially after the formation of the Thoroughbred Championship Series which does not include the Preakness on its schedule.

== Traditions ==
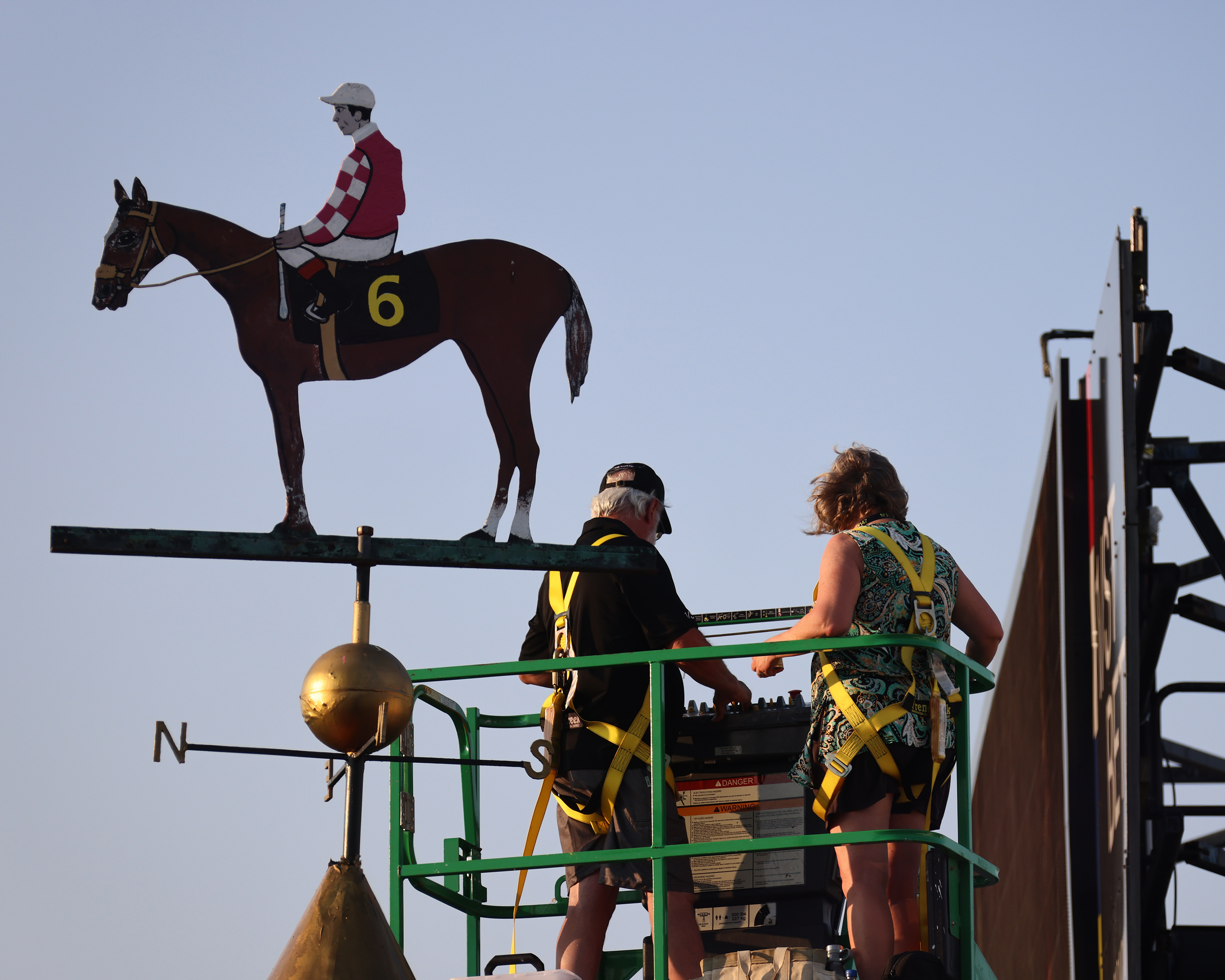
The weather vane at Pimlico is painted with the winner's colors (pictured: colors of 2021 winner Rombauer).

Traditionally, just after the horses for the Preakness were called to the post, the audience was invited to sing the third verse of "Maryland, My Maryland", the then-official state song of Maryland. For many years, the Baltimore Colts' Marching Band would lead the song from the infield; in later years, it was sung by the United States Naval Academy Glee Club. Use of the song was discontinued as of the 2020 edition of the race—the song "which celebrates the Confederacy, is considered by some to be racist." (The song lost its status as state song the following year.)

As soon as the Preakness winner has been declared official, a painter climbs a ladder to the top of a replica of the Old Clubhouse cupola. The colors of the victorious owner's silks are applied on the jockey and horse that are part of the weather vane atop the infield structure. The practice began in 1909 when a horse and rider weather vane sat atop the old Members' Clubhouse, which was constructed when Pimlico opened in 1870. The Victorian building was destroyed by fire in June 1966. A replica of the old building's cupola was built to stand in the Preakness winner's circle in the infield.

A blanket of yellow flowers daubed with black lacquer to recreate the appearance of a black-eyed Susan is placed around the winning horse's neck at this time, and a replica of the Woodlawn Vase is given to the winning horse's owner. Should that horse have also won the Kentucky Derby, speculation and excitement immediately begin to mount as to whether that horse will go on to win the Triple Crown of Thoroughbred Racing at the Belmont Stakes in June.

== Winning the race ==
In 1917, the first Woodlawn Vase was awarded to the Preakness winner, who was not allowed to keep it. Eventually, a half-size reproduction of the trophy was given to winners to keep permanently. The original trophy is kept at the Baltimore Museum of Art and brought to the race each year under guard, for the winner's presentation ceremony.

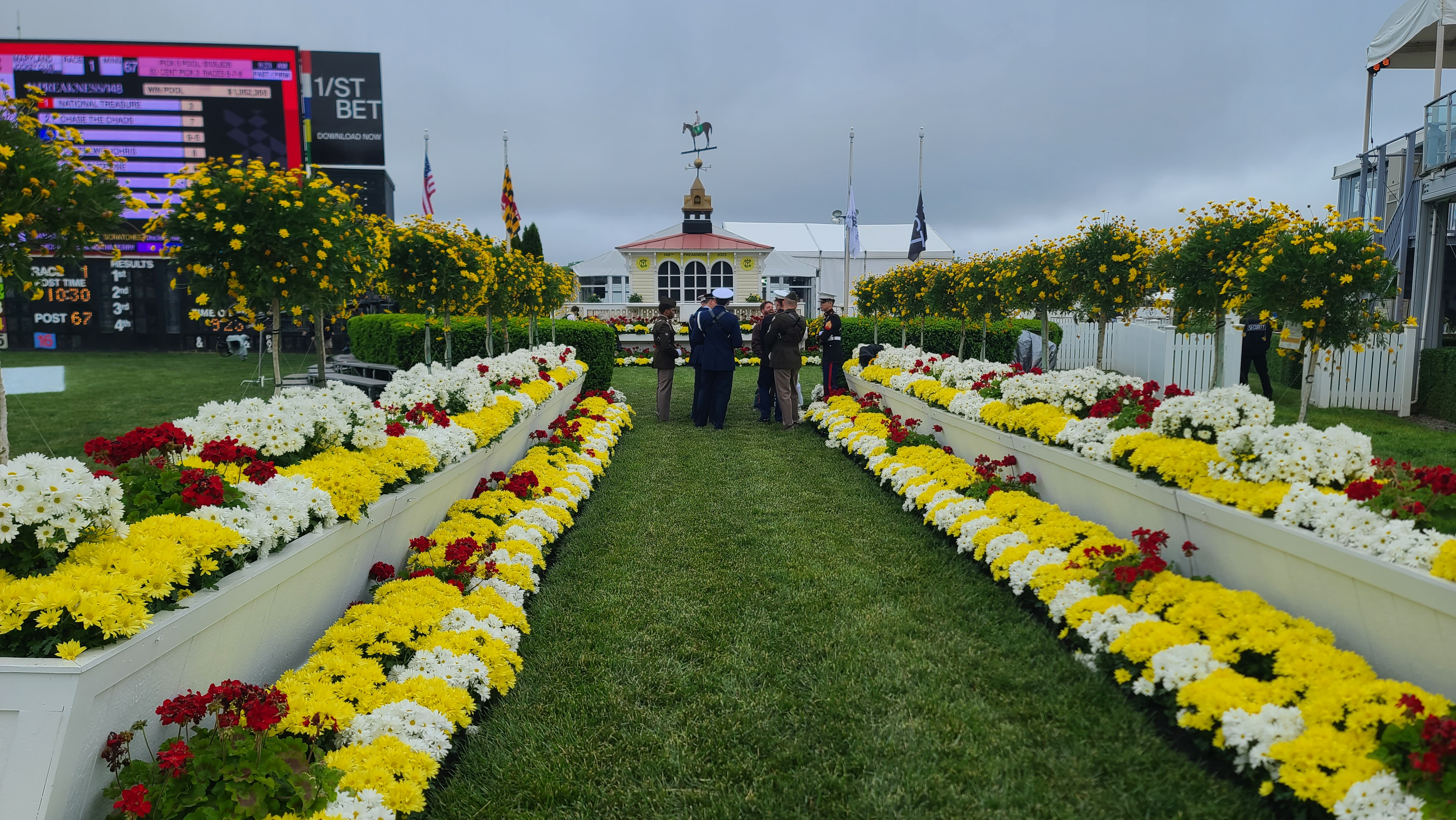
The Winner's Circle and Old Clubhouse lined with Black-Eyed Susans on Preakness Day, May 20, 2023.

In 1940, it was proposed to drape the winning horse in a garland of the Maryland State flower, Rudbeckia hirta, commonly called black-eyed Susans. This posed a problem, as the race is run nearly two months before the flowers come into bloom in late June or July. At first, yellow Viking daisies were painted to resemble black-eyed Susans. Painted flowers have been discontinued since the first decade of the current millennium and Viking Poms, a member of the chrysanthemum family, are now used. Although the Preakness is sometimes referred to as "the race for the black-eyed Susans", no black-eyed Susan is ever used.

In 1918, 26 horses entered the race, and it was run in two divisions, providing for two winners that year. Currently, the race is limited to 14 horses.

In 1948, the Preakness was televised for the first time by CBS.

The Preakness has been run at seven different distances:

- 1 1/2 miles (2.41 km) : 1873–1888, 1890
- 1 1/4 miles (2.01 km) : 1889
- 1 1/16 miles (1.71 km) : 1894–1900, 1908
- 1 mile 70 yards (1.67 km) : 1901–1907
- 1 mile (1.61 km) : 1909, 1910
- 1 1/8 miles (1.81 km) : 1911–1924
- 1 3/16 miles (1.91 km) : 1925–present

== Purse money ==
At its inauguration in 1873, the Preakness carried a value of $1,000. The first major increase occurred in 1919 when the race had a $25,000 value. It climbed to $100,000 in 1946 and in 1959 was raised to $150,000. Subsequent increases occurred from 1979 to 1989, when the purse rose four times from $200,000 to $500,000, before going to $1 million in 1997. On December 12, 2013, the Maryland Jockey Club announced for the 2014 running of the Preakness, the purse would be increased from $1,000,000 to $1,500,000.

== InfieldFest ==
The race has had something of a party atmosphere in the past, especially in the infield, which is general admission. The course had a "bring your own booze" policy until 2009, formerly including kegs of beer but in the 2000s restricted to all the beer cans a person could carry in a cooler. However, despite crowds in excess of 100,000, the BYOB policy was canceled in 2009 after videos of intoxicated people running along the tops of lines of portable toilets while being pelted by beer cans reached a large audience.

In 2009, with the alcohol ban, race attendance dropped to 77,850 after topping 100,000 for eight consecutive years. In 2010, and the Maryland Jockey Club responded with a new event called "InfieldFest" with performances by musical acts, the "Mug Club", which included an infield ticket and an unlimited-refill beer mug, and a mascot named "Kegasus", a play on keg and pegasus (though actually a centaur). The much-derided Kegasus was retired in 2013. In 2010, ticket sales had recovered to 95,760 and have since stayed high.

Aside from InfieldFest, the race is known for its fancy hats and official cocktail, the Black-eyed Susan, made with vodka, St-Germain liqueur and pineapple, lime and orange juices.

== Records ==
Speed record:

- 1 3/16 miles (1.91 km) – 1:53 – Secretariat (1973)

Secretariat, the 1973 winner (and ultimately Triple Crown winner) was originally credited with a running time of 1:55. Two Daily Racing Form clockers, however, had timed Secretariat's Preakness in 1:53 3/5, which would be a new stakes record. A hearing was held over the time discrepancy, where a video replay showed Secretariat reached the wire faster than Canonero II, the then-current record holder, but instead of giving Secretariat the record, the Maryland Jockey Club decided to split the difference and make its official time that of Pimlico's clocker, who had timed the race in 1:54 2/5. The matter was finally resolved in June 2012, when a meeting of the Maryland Racing Commission unanimously ruled to change Secretariat's final time to 1:53 based on testimony and analysis of the race replays. Consequently, Secretariat holds the current official record for all three Triple Crown races.

Other records at other distances:

- 2:36.75, Montague (1890, 1 1/2 miles)
- 2:17.50, Buddhist (1889, 1 1/4 miles)
- 1:46.40, Royal Tourist (1908, 1 1/16 miles)
- 1:44.20, Bryn Mawr (1904, 1 mile 70 yards)
- 1:39.80, Effendi (1909, 1 mile)
- 1:51, Watervale (1911, 1 1/8 miles)

Margin of Victory:

- 11½ lengths – Smarty Jones (2004)

Most wins by a jockey:

- 6 – Eddie Arcaro (1941, 1948, 1950, 1951, 1955, 1957)

Most wins by a trainer:

- 8 – Bob Baffert (1997, 1998, 2001, 2002, 2010, 2015, 2018, 2023)

Most wins by an owner:

- 7 – Calumet Farm (1941, 1944, 1947, 1948, 1956, 1958, 1968, 2013) (also the leading breeder with 7)

== Fillies in the Preakness ==
Six fillies have won the Preakness:

- 2020 – Swiss Skydiver
- 2009 – Rachel Alexandra
- 1924 – Nellie Morse
- 1915 – Rhine Maiden
- 1906 – Whimsical
- 1903 – Flocarline

== Winners (since 1873) ==
Triple Crown winners are in bold.

Year	Horse	Jockey	Trainer	Owner	Distance	Time*	Purse	Ref.
2026	Napoleon Solo	Paco Lopez	Chad Summers	Gold Square, LLC	1 3/16	1:58.69	$2,000,000	
2025	Journalism	Umberto Rispoli	Michael W. McCarthy	Bridlewood Farm, Don Alberto Stable, Eclipse Thoroughbred Partners, Elayne Stables 5, Robert V. LaPenta, Derrick Smith, Mrs. John Magnier and Michael Tabor	1 3/16	1:55.47	$2,000,000	
2024	Seize the Grey	Jaime A. Torres	D. Wayne Lukas	MyRacehorse	1 3/16	1:56.82	$2,000,000	
2023	National Treasure	John R. Velazquez	Bob Baffert	SF Racing LLC, Starlight Racing, Madaket Stables LLC, Masterson, Robert E., Stonestreet Stables LLC, Schoenfarber, Jay A., Waves Edge Capital LLC and Donovan, Catherine	1 3/16	1:55.12	$1,650,000	
2022	Early Voting	José Ortiz	Chad Brown	Klaravich Stables	1 3/16	1:54.54	$1,500,000	
2021	Rombauer	Flavien Prat	Michael W. McCarthy	Diane Fradkin & John Fradkin	1 3/16	1:53.62	$1,000,000	
2020	Swiss Skydiver†	Robby Albarado	Kenneth McPeek	Peter J. Callahan	1 3/16	1:53.28	$1,050,000	
2019	War of Will	Tyler Gaffalione	Mark E. Casse	Gary Barber	1 3/16	1:54.34	$1,500,000	
2018	**Justify**	Mike Smith	Bob Baffert	WinStar Farm & China Horse Club	1 3/16	1:55.93	$1,500,000	
2017	Cloud Computing	Javier Castellano	Chad Brown	Klaravich Stables & William Lawrence	1 3/16	1:55.98	$1,500,000	
2016	Exaggerator	Kent Desormeaux	J. Keith Desormeaux	Big Chief Racing, Head Of Plains Partners, Rocker O Ranch & J. Keith Desormeaux	1 3/16	1:58.31	$1,500,000	
2015	**American Pharoah**	Victor Espinoza	Bob Baffert	Zayat Stables, LLC	1 3/16	1:58.46	$1,500,000	
2014	California Chrome	Victor Espinoza	Art Sherman	Steve Coburn & Perry Martin	1 3/16	1:54.84	$1,500,000	
2013	Oxbow	Gary Stevens	D. Wayne Lukas	Calumet Farm	1 3/16	1:57.54	$1,000,000	
2012	I'll Have Another	Mario Gutierrez	Doug O'Neill	J. Paul Reddam	1 3/16	1:55.94	$1,000,000	
2011	Shackleford	Jesus Castanon	Dale Romans	Mike Lauffer & William D. Cubbedge	1 3/16	1:56.47	$1,500,000	
2010	Lookin At Lucky	Martin Garcia	Bob Baffert	Michael Pegram	1 3/16	1:55.47	$1,000,000	
2009	Rachel Alexandra †	Calvin Borel	Steven M. Asmussen	Stonestreet Stab. & Harold T. McCormick	1 3/16	1:55.08	$1,100,000	
2008	Big Brown	Kent Desormeaux	Richard Dutrow	IEAH Stables & Paul Pompa	1 3/16	1:54.86	$1,000,000	
2007	Curlin	Robby Albarado	Steven M. Asmussen	Stonestreet Stables	1 3/16	1:53.46	$1,000,000	
2006	Bernardini	Javier Castellano	Tom Albertrani	Darley Stables	1 3/16	1:54.65	$1,000,000	
2005	Afleet Alex	Jeremy Rose	Timothy Ritchey	Cash Is King Stable	1 3/16	1:55.04	$1,000,000	
2004	Smarty Jones	Stewart Elliott	John Servis	Someday Farm	1 3/16	1:55.59	$1,000,000	
2003	Funny Cide	Jose Santos	Barclay Tagg	Sackatoga Stable	1 3/16	1:55.61	$1,000,000	
2002	War Emblem	Victor Espinoza	Bob Baffert	The Thoroughbred Corp.	1 3/16	1:56.40	$1,000,000	
2001	Point Given	Gary Stevens	Bob Baffert	The Thoroughbred Corp.	1 3/16	1:55.40	$1,000,000	
2000	Red Bullet	Jerry Bailey	Joe Orseno	Stronach Stables	1 3/16	1:56.00	$1,000,000	
1999	Charismatic	Chris Antley	D. Wayne Lukas	Bob & Beverly Lewis	1 3/16	1:55.20	$1,000,000	
1998	Real Quiet	Kent Desormeaux	Bob Baffert	Michael Pegram	1 3/16	1:54.60	$1,000,000	
1997	Silver Charm	Gary Stevens	Bob Baffert	Bob & Beverly Lewis	1 3/16	1:54.80	$1,000,000	
1996	Louis Quatorze	Pat Day	Nick Zito	William J. Condren, A. Cornacchia & Georgia E. Hofmann	1 3/16	1:53.40	$800,000	
1995	Timber Country	Pat Day	D. Wayne Lukas	Overbrook Farm, Robert B. Lewis &Gainesway Farm	1 3/16	1:54.40	$750,000	
1994	Tabasco Cat	Pat Day	D. Wayne Lukas	David P. Reynolds & Overbrook Farm	1 3/16	1:56.40	$750,000	
1993	Prairie Bayou	Mike Smith	Tom Bohannan	Loblolly Stable	1 3/16	1:56.60	$750,000	
1992	Pine Bluff	Chris McCarron	Tom Bohannan	Loblolly Stable	1 3/16	1:55.60	$750,000	
1991	Hansel	Jerry Bailey	Frank L. Brothers	Lazy Lane Farms	1 3/16	1:54.00	$750,000	
1990	Summer Squall	Pat Day	Neil J. Howard	Dogwood Stable	1 3/16	1:53.60	$750,000	
1989	Sunday Silence	Pat Valenzuela	Charles Whittingham	H-G-W Partners	1 3/16	1:53.80	$750,000	
1988	Risen Star	Ed Delahoussaye	Louie Roussel	Louie Roussel & R. Lamarque	1 3/16	1:56.20	$700,000	
1987	Alysheba	Chris McCarron	Jack Van Berg	Dorothy Scharbauer	1 3/16	1:55.80	$700,000	
1986	Snow Chief	Alex Solis	Melvin F. Stute	Carl Grinstead	1 3/16	1:54.80	$700,000	
1985	Tank's Prospect	Pat Day	D. Wayne Lukas	Eugene V. Klein	1 3/16	1:53.40	$700,000	
1984	Gate Dancer	Angel Cordero	Jack Van Berg	Kenneth Opstein	1 3/16	1:53.60	$400,000	
1983	Deputed Testamony	Donnie Miller Jr.	J. William Boniface	Bonita Farm	1 3/16	1:55.40	$400,000	
1982	Aloma's Ruler	Jack Kaenel	John J. Lenzini Jr.	Nathan Scherr	1 3/16	1:55.40	$350,000	
1981	Pleasant Colony	Jorge Velásquez	John P. Campo	Buckland Farm	1 3/16	1:54.60	$350,000	
1980	Codex	Angel Cordero	D. Wayne Lukas	Tartan Stable	1 3/16	1:54.20	$300,000	
1979	Spectacular Bid	Ronnie Franklin	Bud Delp	Hawksworth Farm	1 3/16	1:54.20	$300,000	
1978	**Affirmed**	Steve Cauthen	Laz Barrera	Harbor View Farm	1 3/16	1:54.40	$250,000	
1977	**Seattle Slew**	Jean Cruguet	Bill Turner	Karen L. Taylor	1 3/16	1:54.40	$250,000	
1976	Elocutionist	John Lively	Paul T. Adwell	Eugene C. Cashman	1 3/16	1:55.00	$250,000	
1975	Master Derby	Darrel McHargue	Smiley Adams	Golden Chance Farm	1 3/16	1:56.40	$250,000	
1974	Little Current	Miguel A. Rivera	Lou Rondinello	Darby Dan Farm	1 3/16	1:54.60	$250,000	
1973	**Secretariat**	Ron Turcotte	Lucien Laurin	Meadow Stable	1 3/16	**1:53.00**	$250,000	
1972	Bee Bee Bee	Eldon Nelson	Del W. Carroll	William S. Farish III	1 3/16	1:55.60	$250,000	
1971	Canonero II	Gustavo Ávila	Juan Arias	Edgar Caibett	1 3/16	1:54.00	$250,000	
1970	Personality	Eddie Belmonte	John W. Jacobs	Ethel D. Jacobs	1 3/16	1:56.20	$200,000	
1969	Majestic Prince	Bill Hartack	Johnny Longden	Frank M. McMahon	1 3/16	1:55.60	$200,000	
1968	Forward Pass	Ismael Valenzuela	Henry Forrest	Calumet Farm	1 3/16	1:56.80	$200,000	
1967	Damascus	Bill Shoemaker	Frank Whiteley	Edith W. Bancroft	1 3/16	1:55.20	$200,000	
1966	Kauai King	Don Brumfield	Henry Forrest	Ford Stable (Mike Ford)	1 3/16	1:55.40	$200,000	
1965	Tom Rolfe	Ron Turcotte	Frank Whiteley	Powhatan Stable	1 3/16	1:56.20	$200,000	
1964	Northern Dancer	Bill Hartack	Horatio Luro	Windfields Farm	1 3/16	1:56.80	$200,000	
1963	Candy Spots	Bill Shoemaker	Mesh Tenney	Rex C. Ellsworth	1 3/16	1:56.20	$200,000	
1962	Greek Money	John L. Rotz	Virgil W. Raines	Brandywine Stable	1 3/16	1:56.20	$200,000	
1961	Carry Back	Johnny Sellers	Jack A. Price	Katherine Price	1 3/16	1:57.60	$200,000	
1960	Bally Ache	Bobby Ussery	Jimmy Pitt	Turfland	1 3/16	1:57.60	$250,000	
1959	Royal Orbit	William Harmatz	Reggie Cornell	Halina Gregory Braunstein	1 3/16	1:57.00	$250,000	
1958	Tim Tam	Ismael Valenzuela	Horace A. Jones	Calumet Farm	1 3/16	1:57.20	$165,000	
1957	Bold Ruler	Eddie Arcaro	Jim Fitzsimmons	Wheatley Stable	1 3/16	1:56.20	$110,000	
1956	Fabius	Bill Hartack	Horace A. Jones	Calumet Farm	1 3/16	1:58.40	$150,000	
1955	Nashua	Eddie Arcaro	Jim Fitzsimmons	Belair Stud	1 3/16	1:54.60	$110,000	
1954	Hasty Road	John H. Adams	Harry Trotsek	Hasty House Farm	1 3/16	1:57.40	$150,000	
1953	Native Dancer	Eric Guerin	Bill Winfrey	Alfred G. Vanderbilt II	1 3/16	1:57.80	$110,000	
1952	Blue Man	Conn McCreary	Woody Stephens	White Oak Stable	1 3/16	1:57.40	$150,000	
1951	Bold	Eddie Arcaro	Preston M. Burch	Brookmeade Stable	1 3/16	1:56.40	$150,000	
1950	Hill Prince	Eddie Arcaro	Casey Hayes	Christopher Chenery	1 3/16	1:59.20	$100,000	
1949	Capot	Ted Atkinson	John M. Gaver Sr.	Greentree Stable	1 3/16	1:56.00	$150,000	
1948	**Citation**	Eddie Arcaro	Horace A. Jones	Calumet Farm	1 3/16	2:02.40	$160,000	
1947	Faultless	Douglas Dodson	Horace A. Jones	Calumet Farm	1 3/16	1:59.00	$160,000	
1946	**Assault**	Warren Mehrtens	Max Hirsch	King Ranch	1 3/16	2:01.40	$160,000	
1945	Polynesian	Wayne D. Wright	Morris H. Dixon	Gertrude T. Widener	1 3/16	1:58.80	$110,000	
1944	Pensive	Conn McCreary	Ben A. Jones	Calumet Farm	1 3/16	1:59.20	$100,000	
1943	**Count Fleet**	Johnny Longden	Don Cameron	Fannie Hertz	1 3/16	1:57.40	$75,000	
1942	Alsab	Basil James	Sarge Swenke	Mrs. Albert Sabath	1 3/16	1:57.00	$100,000	
1941	**Whirlaway**	Eddie Arcaro	Ben A. Jones	Calumet Farm	1 3/16	1:58.80	$75,000	
1940	Bimelech	Fred A. Smith	William A. Hurley	Edward R. Bradley	1 3/16	1:58.60	$75,000	
1939	Challedon	George Seabo	Louis Schaefer	William L. Brann	1 3/16	1:59.80	$75,000	
1938	Dauber	Maurice Peters	Richard E. Handlen	Foxcatcher Farms	1 3/16	1:59.80	$75,000	
1937	**War Admiral**	Charley Kurtsinger	George Conway	Glen Riddle Farm	1 3/16	1:58.40	$75,000	
1936	Bold Venture	George Woolf	Max Hirsch	Morton L. Schwartz	1 3/16	1:59.00	$50,000	
1935	**Omaha**	Willie Saunders	Jim Fitzsimmons	Belair Stud	1 3/16	1:58.40	$50,000	
1934	High Quest	Robert Jones	Robert Augustus Smith	Brookmeade Stable	1 3/16	1:58.20	$50,000	
1933	Head Play	Charley Kurtsinger	Thomas P. Hayes	Suzanne Mason	1 3/16	2:02.00	$50,000	
1932	Burgoo King	Eugene James	H. J. Thompson	Edward R. Bradley	1 3/16	1:59.80	$90,000	
1931	Mate	George Ellis	James W. Healy	Albert C. Bostwick Jr.	1 3/16	1:59.00	$90,000	
1930	**Gallant Fox**	Earl Sande	Jim Fitzsimmons	Belair Stud	1 3/16	2:00.60	$90,000	
1929	Dr. Freeland	Louis Schaefer	Thomas J. Healey	Walter J. Salmon Sr.	1 3/16	2:01.60	$90,000	
1928	Victorian	Raymond Workman	James G. Rowe Jr.	Harry P. Whitney	1 3/16	2:00.20	$90,000	
1927	Bostonian	Whitey Abel	Fred Hopkins	Harry P. Whitney	1 3/16	2:01.60	$100,000	
1926	Display	John Maiben	Thomas J. Healey	Walter J. Salmon Sr.	1 3/16	1:59.80	$90,000	
1925	Coventry	Clarence Kummer	William B. Duke	Gifford A. Cochran	1 3/16	1:59.00	$90,000	
1924	Nellie Morse †	John Merimee	Albert B. Gordon	Bud Fisher	1 1/8	1:57.20	$90,000	
1923	Vigil	Benny Marinelli	Thomas J. Healey	Walter J. Salmon Sr.	1 1/8	1:53.60	$90,000	
1922	Pillory	Louis Morris	Thomas J. Healey	Richard T. Wilson Jr.	1 1/8	1:51.60	$90,000	
1921	Broomspun	Frank Coltiletti	James G. Rowe Sr.	Harry P. Whitney	1 1/8	1:54.20	$75,000	
1920	Man o' War	Clarence Kummer	Louis Feustel	Glen Riddle Farm	1 1/8	1:51.60	$40,000	
1919	**Sir Barton**	Johnny Loftus	H. Guy Bedwell	J. K. L. Ross	1 1/8	1:53.00	$40,000	
1918	War Cloud	Johnny Loftus	Walter B. Jennings	A. Kingsley Macomber	1 1/8	1:53.60	$20,000	
1918	Jack Hare Jr.	Charles Peak	Frank D. Weir	William E. Applegate	1 1/8	1:53.40	$20,000	
1917	Kalitan	Everett Haynes	Bill Hurley	Edward R. Bradley	1 1/8	1:54.40	$7,500	
1916	Damrosch	Linus McAtee	Albert G. Weston	J. K. L. Ross	1 1/8	1:54.80	$2,000	
1915	Rhine Maiden †	Douglas Hoffman	Frank Devers	Edward F. Whitney	1 1/8	1:58.00	$2,000	
1914	Holiday	Andy Schuttinger	J. Simon Healy	Mrs. Archibald Barklie	1 1/8	1:53.80	$2,000	
1913	Buskin	James Butwell	John Whalen	John Whalen	1 1/8	1:53.40	$3,000	
1912	Colonel Holloway	Clarence Turner	Dave Woodford	Beverwyck Stable	1 1/8	1:56.60	$2,500	
1911	Watervale	Eddie Dugan	John Whalen	August Belmont Jr.	1 1/8	1:51.00	$4,500	
1910	Layminster	Roy Estep	J. Simon Healy	Edward B. Cassatt	1 mile	1:40.60	$5,500	
1909	Effendi	Willie Doyle	Frank C. Frisbie	W. T. Ryan	1 mile	1:39.80	$5,500	
1908	Royal Tourist	Eddie Dugan	A. Jack Joyner	Harry P. Whitney	1 1/16	1:46.40	$4,000	
1907	Don Enrique	George Mountain	A. Jack Joyner	August Belmont Jr.	1 mile 70 yards	1:45.40	$3,800	
1906	Whimsical †	Walter Miller	Tim J. Gaynor	Tim J. Gaynor	1 mile 70 yards	1:45.00	$3,800	
1905	Cairngorm	Willie Davis	A. Jack Joyner	Sydney Paget	1 mile 70 yards	1:45.80	$3,600	
1904	Bryn Mawr	Gene Hildebrand	W. Fred Presgrave	Goughacres Stable	1 mile 70 yards	1:44.20	$3,800	
1903	Flocarline †	William Gannon	Henry C. Riddle	Myron H. Tichenor	1 mile 70 yards	1:44.80	$3,000	
1902	Old England	Lee Jackson	Green B. Morris	Green B. Morris	1 mile 70 yards	1:45.80	$3,750	
1901	The Parader	Frank Landry	Thomas J. Healey	Richard T. Wilson Jr.	1 mile 70 yards	1:47.20	$2,650	
1900	Hindus	Henry Spencer	John H. Morris	George J. Long	1 1/16	1:48.40	$3,000	
1899	Half Time	Richard Clawson	Frank McCabe	Philip J. Dwyer	1 1/16	1:47.00	$2,500	
1898	Sly Fox	Willie Simms	Hardy Campbell Jr.	Charles F. Dwyer	1 1/16	1:49.75	$2,400	
1897	Paul Kauvar	T. Thorpe	Thomas P. Hayes	Thomas P. Hayes	1 1/16	1:51.25	$2,400	
1896	Margrave	Henry Griffin	Byron McClelland	August Belmont Jr.	1 1/16	1:51.00	$2,250	
1895	Belmar	Fred Taral	Edward Feakes	Preakness Stables	1 1/16	1:50.50	$2,250	
1894	Assignee	Fred Taral	William Lakeland	James R. Keene & Foxhall P. Keene	1 1/16	1:49.25	$3,000	
1893	no race held							
1892	no race held							
1891	no race held							
1890	Montague	Willie Martin	Edward Feakes	Preakness Stables	1 1/2	2:36.75	$2,000	
1889	Buddhist	George Anderson	John W. Rogers	Samuel S. Brown	1 1/4	2:17.50	$2,000	
1888	Refund	Fred Littlefield	R. W. Walden	R. Wyndham Walden	1 1/2	2:49.00	$2,000	
1887	Dunboyne	William Donohue	William Jennings Sr.	William Jennings Sr.	1 1/2	2:39.50	$2,500	
1886	The Bard	Sam H. Fisher	John Huggins	Alexander J. Cassatt	1 1/2	2:45.00	$3,000	
1885	Tecumseh	Jim McLaughlin	Charles S. Littlefield	W. Donohue	1 1/2	2:49.00	$3,000	
1884	Knight of Ellerslie	Sam H. Fisher	Thomas Doswell	Richard J. Hancock & Thomas Doswell	1 1/2	2:39.50	$3,000	
1883	Jacobus	George Barbee	Richard Dwyer	James E. Kelley	1 1/2	2:42.50	$2,500	
1882	Vanguard	Tom Costello	R. W. Walden	George L. Lorillard	1 1/2	2:44.50	$2,000	
1881	Saunterer	Tom Costello	R. W. Walden	George L. Lorillard	1 1/2	2:40.50	$3,000	
1880	Grenada	Lloyd Hughes	R. W. Walden	George L. Lorillard	1 1/2	2:40.50	$3,000	
1879	Harold	Lloyd Hughes	R. W. Walden	George L. Lorillard	1 1/2	2:40.50	$4,000	
1878	Duke of Magenta	Cyrus Holloway	R. W. Walden	George L. Lorillard	1 1/2	2:41.75	$3,500	
1877	Cloverbrook	Cyrus Holloway	Jeter Walden	Edward A. Clabaugh	1 1/2	2:45.50	$2,500	
1876	Shirley	George Barbee	William Brown	Pierre Lorillard IV	1 1/2	2:44.75	$3,000	
1875	Tom Ochiltree	Lloyd Hughes	R. W. Walden	John F. Chamberlain	1 1/2	2:43.50	$3,000	
1874	Culpepper	William Donohue	Hugh Gaffney	Hugh Gaffney	1 1/2	2:56.50	$3,000	
1873	Survivor	George Barbee	A. Davis Pryor	John F. Chamberlain	1 1/2	2:43.00	$3,000	

- Notes:

Timed to 1/4 second 1873 to 1899, to 1/5 second 1900 to 2002, to 0.01 second since 2003.
All winners have been three years old, except Montague in 1890 who was five years old.

A † designates a filly.
§ D. Wayne Lukas swept the 1995 Triple Crown with two different horses.

== Sire lines ==
Winners of the Preakness Stakes can be connected to each other due to the practice of arranging horse breeding based on their previous success. All of the horses can be traced back to the three foundational sires, with Godolphin Arabian the ancestor of 7 winners, Byerley Turk the ancestor of 13 winners, and Darley Arabian the ancestor of 132 winners, including all winners since 1938.

The Mr Prospector direct sire line has produced the last 6 Preakness Stakes winners, with 4 of those winners descended through his son Fappiano.

=== Darley Arabian line ===
- the Darley Arabian (1700c) sire line (all branched through the Eclipse (1764) line) produced 132 Stakes winners (123 colts, 3 geldings, 6 fillies), including all winners from 1938 to present. The main branches of this sire line are:
  - the King Fergus (1775) branch (all branched through the Voltigeur (1847) line), produced 13 winners. His sire line continued primarily through his son Vedette (1854) with 12 winners, due primarily to his son Galopin (1872) with 9 winners (exclusively through St. Simon (1881), most recently Pleasant Colony in 1981).
  - the Potoooooooo (1773) branch produced 118 winners (all branched through the Waxy (1790) line), including all winners from 1982 to present. The primary branch of this sire line is through Whalebone (1807), which has produced 117 winners. In turn, the primary branch continues through Sir Hercules (1826), which has produced 99 winners (including all winners since 1984), and then the Birdcatcher (1833) branch which produced 92 winners. From Birdcatcher, the branch of The Baron (1842) has produced 87 winners (exclusively through the Stockwell (1849) line). Birdcatcher's grandson Doncaster (1870) sired Bend Or (1877), whose sire line accounts for 79 winners. The main branch of the Bend Or sire line continued through his son Bona Vista (1889) with 65 winners, nearly exclusively through the Phalaris (1913) line with 64 winners, which has dominated in the last several decades (including all winners from 1984 to present) through the following sons:
    - the Fairway (1925) branch (1 winner, most recently Bally Ache in 1960);
    - the Pharamond (1925) branch (5 winners, most recently Silver Charm in 1997);
    - the Sickle (1924) branch, which has produced all winners from 2021 to present, (29 winners exclusively through Polynesian (1942) with his win in the 1945 Preakness Stakes, continued exclusively through his son Native Dancer (1950) with his win in the 1953 Preakness Stakes, continued primarily through his son Raise a Native (1961) with 25 winners, down through Mr Prospector (1970) with 22 winners (including all winners from 2021 to present) through 9 different sons: Tank’s Prospect, with his win in the 1985 Preakness Stakes, and 8 other sons through their progeny, with his son Fappiano (1977) accounting for 7 winners, (most recently Napoleon Solo in 2026));
    - the Pharos (1920) branch (29 winners all branched through the Nearco (1935) line, through his sons Royal Charger (1942), Nearctic (1954), and Nasrullah (1940)). The Royal Charger branch produced 5 winners (most recently Swiss Skydiver in 2020), the Nasrullah branch produced 11 winners primarily due to his son Bold Ruler (1954) with 10 winners (most recently California Chrome in 2014), while the Nearctic branch produced 13 winners, exclusively through his son Northern Dancer (1961) with his win in the 1964 Preakness Stakes, and direct male progeny of 12 winners, most recently War of Will in 2019, with his son Storm Bird (1978) accounting for 5 winners (most recently Justify in 2018).
    - special notes:
      - the Whalebone (1807) branch produced two main lines: the primary branch of Sir Hercules and the secondary branch of Camel (1822) (14 winners exclusively through the Touchstone (1831) line), which produced 1983 Preakness Stakes winner Deputed Testimony through his grandson Newminster's (1848) branch. Since then, each winner of the Preakness Stakes has gone through Whalebone's more frequent sire line branch of Sir Herecules (1826). The Newminster branch is the more common of the two branches derived through Camel with 8 winners. Newminster's brother Orlando (1841) produced 6 winners (exclusively through the Commando (1898) line with 6 winners), most recently Carry Back in 1961.
      - the Sir Hercules (1826) branch produced two main lines: the primary branch of Birdcatcher (1833), and the secondary branch of Faugh-a-Ballagh (1841) which produced 6 winners (exclusively through the Leamington (1853) line), most recently 1901 Preakness Stakes winner The Parader.
      - the Birdcatcher (1833) branch produced two main lines: the primary branch of The Baron (1842), and the secondary branch of Oxford (1857) which produced 6 winners (exclusively through the Sterling (1868) line), most recently 1946 Preakness Stakes winner Assault.
      - the Bend Or (1877) branch produced two main lines: the primary branch of Bona Vista (1889), and the secondary branch of Ormonde (1883) which produced 10 winners (primarily through the Teddy (1913) line with 8 winners), most recently 1967 Preakness Stakes winner Damascus.

=== Byerley Turk line ===
- the Byerley Turk (1680c) sire line produced 13 winners (10 colts, 3 geldings). The main branches of this sire (all branched through the Herod (1758) line) are:
  - the Highflyer (1774) branch produced 1 winner, most recently Montague in 1890
  - the Florizel (1768) branch produced 6 winners (all branched through the Lexington (1850) line), most recently Hindus in 1900
  - the Woodpecker (1773) branch produced 6 winners (all branched through the Buzzard (1787) line). The main branches of this sire line are:
    - the Castrel (1801) branch produced 1 winner, most recently Kalitan in 1917
    - the Selim (1802) branch produced 5 winners (all branched through the Vandal (1850) line). The main branches of this sire line are:
      - Survivor (1870), winner of the 1873 Preakness Stakes
      - the Virgil (1864) branch produced 4 winners (1882 Preakness Stakes winner Vanguard, and 3 winners branched through the Hindoo (1878) line), most recently Buskin in 1913

=== Godolphin Arabian line ===
- the Godolphin Arabian (1724c) sire line produced 7 winners (6 colts, 1 gelding). The main branches of this sire (all branched through the Australian (1858) line) are:
  - the Attila (1871) branch produced 1 winner, most recently Tecumseh in 1885
  - the Spendthrift (1876) branch produced 6 winners (1894 Preakness Stakes winner Assignee (1891) and 5 winners branched through the Hastings (1893) line), including:
    - Don Enrique (1904), winner of the 1907 Preakness Stakes
    - the Fair Play (1905) branch produced 4 winners, most recently War Admiral in 1937

Preakness Stakes winners with male-line descendants including other Preakness Stakes winners

- Polynesian (1945 winner) – 27 winners (26 colts, 1 gelding); most recently Journalism (2025)
- Native Dancer (1953 winner) – 26 winners (25 colts, 1 gelding); most recently Journalism (2025)
- Northern Dancer (1964 winner) – 12 winners (11 colts, 1 filly); most recently War of Will (2019)
- Bold Ruler (1957 winner) – 7 colts; most recently California Chrome (2014)
- Seattle Slew (1977 winner) – 2 colts; most recently California Chrome (2014)
- Gallant Fox (1930 winner) – 1 colt; Omaha (1935)
- Man o' War (1920 winner) – 1 colt; War Admiral (1937)
- Bold Venture (1936 winner) – 1 colt; Assault (1946)
- Citation (1948 winner) – 1 colt; Fabius (1956)
- Secretariat (1973 winner) – 1 colt; Risen Star (1988)
- Summer Squall (1990 winner) – 1 colt; Charismatic (1999)
- Curlin (2007 winner) – 1 colt; Exaggerator (2016)

== See also ==
- American thoroughbred racing top attended events
- Black-Eyed Susan Stakes
- Grand Slam of Thoroughbred Racing
- List of Preakness Stakes broadcasters
- Maryland Jockey Club
- Preakness Stakes top four finishers
- Thoroughbred Owners and Breeders Association
- Triple Crown Productions
- Triple Crown of Thoroughbred Racing
