= Montague (horse) =

American-bred Thoroughbred racehorse

- Sire: Mortemer
- Grandsire: Compiegne
- Dam: Evadne
- Damsire: Lexington
- Sex: Stallion
- Foaled: 1885
- Country: United States
- Colour: Chestnut
- Breeder: Alexander J. Cassatt
- Owner: Preakness Stables
- Trainer: Edward Feakes

Major wins
- American Classics wins: Preakness Stakes (1890)

Montague was an American Thoroughbred racehorse. He won first running of the 1890 Preakness Handicap at Morris Park Racecourse on the Belmont Stakes day undercard. In the 1960s, the race was controversially recognized as the 18th running of the Preakness Stakes despite the fact that no three-year-olds ran. Five-year-old Montague beat three rivals, four-year-old Philosophy, five-year-old Barrister and eight-year-old Ten Broker.
