= Edward B. Cassatt =

American soldier and racehorse breeder

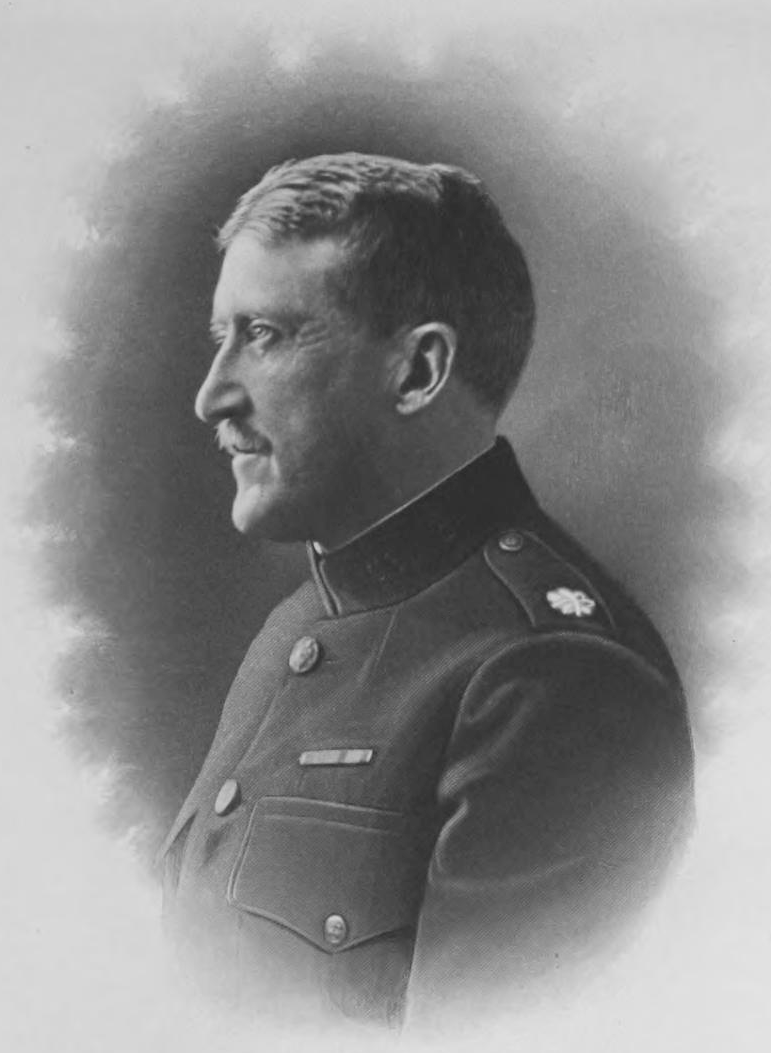
- Born: August 23, 1869; Altoona, Pennsylvania, United States
- Died: January 31, 1922 (aged 52); Berwyn, Pennsylvania, United States
- Resting place: Church of the Redeemer, Bryn Mawr, Pennsylvania
- Education: Haverford College; Ecole Militaire, St. Cyr; United States Military Academy
- Occupations: Soldier, racehorse owner/breeder
- Political party: Democratic
- Spouses: Emily Louise Phillips (m. 1893; div. 1904) Eleanor Blackford Smith (m. 1908)
- Children: Lois Buchanan (1894–1977)
- Parents: Alexander Cassatt (1839–1906); Lois Buchanan (1847–1920)

Signature
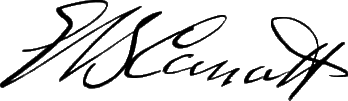

Colonel Edward Buchanan Cassatt (August 23, 1869 – January 31, 1922) was an American soldier and an owner/breeder of Thoroughbred racehorses. He was the son of Alexander Cassatt, president of the Pennsylvania Railroad, and Lois Buchanan, niece of James Buchanan, 15th President of the United States.

== Early life and education ==
Edward B. Cassatt was born in Altoona, Pennsylvania on August 23, 1869. He studied at Haverford College then at École spéciale militaire de Saint-Cyr in France before graduating from West Point in 1903. He served with the United States Cavalry in the Spanish–American War and the Philippine–American War. He also served as military attaché at the Embassy of the United States in London, England.

He married Emily Louise Phillips in 1893 and divorced in 1904. They had one child, Lois, who married John B.Thayer III. He married a second time in 1908 to Eleanor Blackford Smith of Virginia. She was about twenty years his junior and shared his love of horses.

Edward Cassatt ran as a Democrat for the 65th United States Congress (1917–1919) but lost to incumbent Republican, Thomas S. Butler.

== Thoroughbred racing ==
On the death of his father in 1906, Edward Cassatt inherited Chesterbrook Farm in Berwyn, Pennsylvania, where his father had bred Thoroughbred horses. The most successful runner for Alexander Cassatt had been The Bard, a multiple Champion and winner of the 1886 Preakness Stakes. Edward Cassatt had similar success with his horse, Layminister, who won the Preakness Stakes in 1910.

Edward Cassatt was a member of The Jockey Club and the National Steeplechase and Hunt Association.

Colonel Edward Cassatt died on January 31, 1922, at Chesterbrook Farm in Berwyn, Pennsylvania. He was interred in the Church of the Redeemer Cemetery in Bryn Mawr, Pennsylvania.
