= Buskin (horse) =

American-bred Thoroughbred racehorse

- Sire: Hamburg
- Grandsire: Hanover
- Dam: Slippers
- Damsire: Meddler
- Sex: Gelding
- Foaled: 1910
- Country: United States
- Color: Bay
- Breeder: Harry P. Whitney
- Owner: John Whalen
- Trainer: John Whalen
- Record: Not found
- Earnings: Not found

Major wins
- Bowie Handicap (1913); Canadian Derby (1913); Metropolitan Handicap (1914) American Classics wins: Preakness Stakes (1913)

Buskin (1910 – July 5, 1917) was an American Thoroughbred racehorse is best known for winning the 1913 Preakness Stakes. Owned and trained by John Whalen, he was sired by Hamburg. Buskin was out of the mare Slippers, a daughter of Meddler.

== Preakness Stakes ==
Buskin, described as "a good-looking little bay gelding" won the $2,500 Preakness Stakes at Pimlico Race Course in Baltimore, Maryland on Tuesday, May 20, 1913.

He went off as the heavy favorite at 3–2 in the field of eight three-year-olds after five of the thirteen colts scratched. Buskin broke first but fell back to fourth under a heavy hold by jockey Jimmy Butwell as they hit Pimlico's famous "Clubhouse Turn." The pace was slow early with the first quarter in :24 flat and the half in :48-4/5. As the race progressed, Buskin was continually restrained as he dropped to fifth down the backstretch but tracked the pacemakers just three lengths behind.

On the final turn, he rounded the field four wide and burst into the lead by three lengths before tiring badly in the final sixteenth. He held off the charge of runner-up and third choice Kleburne by a neck. Longshot Barnegat at 48-1 finished third. The final time for the one mile and one eighth Preakness was 1:53 2/5 over a fast track. The winner's share of 60% of the purse was $1,670.

Buskin and Holiday the next year were the last geldings to win the Preakness Stakes until Prairie Bayou won the race in 1993.

== Later racing career ==
Later that racing season, Buskin won the 1913 Canadian Derby and placed second in the National Stakes. In his four-year-old season, he won the 1914 Metropolitan Handicap and Bowie Handicap. Also in 1914 or 1915, Buskin placed second in the Brooklyn Handicap, Bowie Handicap, Susquehanna Handicap and Toronto Cup while placing third in the Frontier Handicap and the Washington Handicap. Buskin was injured in the spring of 1916 and was euthanized on July 5, 1917, at Belmont Park due to worsening of his condition.

== Breeding ==
Pedigree of Buskin
Sire Hamburg bay 1895	Hanover ch. 1884	Hindoo	Virgil
Sire Hamburg bay 1895	Hanover ch. 1884	Hindoo	Florence
Sire Hamburg bay 1895	Hanover ch. 1884	Bourbon Belle	Bonnie Scotland
Sire Hamburg bay 1895	Hanover ch. 1884	Bourbon Belle	Ella D.
Sire Hamburg bay 1895	Lady Reel bay 1886	Fellow Craft	Australian
Sire Hamburg bay 1895	Lady Reel bay 1886	Fellow Craft	Aerolite
Sire Hamburg bay 1895	Lady Reel bay 1886	Mannie Gray	Enquirer
Sire Hamburg bay 1895	Lady Reel bay 1886	Mannie Gray	Lizzy G
Dam Slippers brown 1904	Meddler bay 1890	St. Gatien	The Rover
Dam Slippers brown 1904	Meddler bay 1890	St. Gatien	Saint Editha
Dam Slippers brown 1904	Meddler bay 1890	Busybody	Petrarch
Dam Slippers brown 1904	Meddler bay 1890	Busybody	Spinaway
Dam Slippers brown 1904	Cinderella bay 1885	Tomahawk	King Tom
Dam Slippers brown 1904	Cinderella bay 1885	Tomahawk	Mincemeat
Dam Slippers brown 1904	Cinderella bay 1885	Manna	Brown Bred
Dam Slippers brown 1904	Cinderella bay 1885	Manna	Tartlet
