= Paul Kauvar =

American Thoroughbred racehorse

- Sire: Pirate of Penance
- Grandsire: Prince Charlie
- Dam: Spirit
- Damsire: Australian
- Sex: Stallion
- Foaled: April 25, 1894
- Country: United States
- Colour: Bay
- Breeder: McGrathiana Stud
- Owner: Thomas P. Hayes
- Trainer: Thomas P. Hayes

Major wins
- American Classics wins: Preakness Stakes (1897)

Paul Kauvar was an American Thoroughbred racehorse. He won the 1897 Preakness Stakes, a race that in 1919 would become the second leg of the U.S. Triple Crown series. He was sold to Louis Ezell for $1,500 in 1898, but was injured before the Colombia Stakes in October.
