= Rhine Maiden (horse) =

American-bred Thoroughbred racehorse

- Sire: Watercress
- Grandsire: Springfield
- Dam: Gold
- Damsire: Golden Garter
- Sex: Filly
- Foaled: 1912
- Country: United States
- Color: Bay
- Breeder: James Ben Ali Haggin
- Owner: Edward F. Whitney
- Trainer: Frank Devers
- Record: Not found
- Earnings: Not found

Major wins
- Clarendon Handicap (1916); Ladies Handicap (1917); Regret Handicap (1917) American Classics wins: Preakness Stakes (1915)
- Last updated on September 23, 2007

Rhine Maiden (1912–1923) was an American thoroughbred racehorse.

== Background ==
Rhine Maiden was sired by Prince of Wales Stakes winner, Watercress, out of the Golden Garter mare, Gold. Watercress was also the sire of Preakness Stakes winner, Watervale.

== Racing career ==
Rhine Maiden is best known as just the third filly to ever win the Preakness Stakes. She did it in a time of 1:58 with Douglas Hoffman aboard by 1½ lengths over Half Rock and Runes. The filly appeared ideally suited by the muddy track and the front-running tactics employed by her jockey Hoffman. 1915 was the year that the filly Regret won the Kentucky Derby but did not challenge Rhine Maiden in the Preakness. Not since 1915 has more than one of the Triple Crown races been won by a filly.

Racing at age four, Rhine Maiden won the Clarendon Handicap at New York's Jamaica Race Course.

As a five-year-old in 1917, Rhine Maiden recorded an upset victory in the Ladies Handicap at Belmont Park in June. In September of the same year she won the Regret Handicap at Aqueduct Race Track, beating Dorcas by three lengths.

Rhine Maiden died in 1923.

== Pedigree ==
Pedigree of Rhine Maiden (USA), bay mare, 1912
Sire Watercress (GB) 1889	Springfield (GB); 1873	St.Albans	Stockwell
Sire Watercress (GB) 1889	Springfield (GB); 1873	St.Albans	Bribery
Sire Watercress (GB) 1889	Springfield (GB); 1873	Viridis	Marsyas
Sire Watercress (GB) 1889	Springfield (GB); 1873	Viridis	Maid of Palmyra
Sire Watercress (GB) 1889	Wharfedale (GB); 1879	Hermit	Newminster
Sire Watercress (GB) 1889	Wharfedale (GB); 1879	Hermit	Seclusion
Sire Watercress (GB) 1889	Wharfedale (GB); 1879	Bonnie Doon	Rapid Rhone
Sire Watercress (GB) 1889	Wharfedale (GB); 1879	Bonnie Doon	Queen Mary
Dam Gold (USA) 1904	Golden Garter (GB); 1888	Bend Or	Doncaster
Dam Gold (USA) 1904	Golden Garter (GB); 1888	Bend Or	Rouge Rose
Dam Gold (USA) 1904	Golden Garter (GB); 1888	Sanda	Wenlock
Dam Gold (USA) 1904	Golden Garter (GB); 1888	Sanda	Sandal
Dam Gold (USA) 1904	Miss Maxim (USA); 1893	Maxim (NZ)	Musket (GB)
Dam Gold (USA) 1904	Miss Maxim (USA); 1893	Maxim (NZ)	Realisation (GB)
Dam Gold (USA) 1904	Miss Maxim (USA); 1893	Ventura	Virgil
Dam Gold (USA) 1904	Miss Maxim (USA); 1893	Ventura	Ulrica (Family: 11)
