= Survivor (horse) =

American-bred Thoroughbred racehorse

- Sire: Vandal
- Grandsire: Glencoe
- Dam: Millie J
- Damsire: Lexington
- Sex: Stallion
- Foaled: 1870
- Country: United States
- Colour: Bay
- Breeder: John M. Clay
- Owner: John F. Chamberlain
- Trainer: R. Wyndham Walden
- Record: Not found
- Earnings: Not found

Major wins
- American Classics wins: Preakness Stakes (1873)
- Last updated on December 26, 2006

Survivor was an American Thoroughbred racehorse. He was foaled in Kentucky in 1870 and is best known as the winner of the first running of the Preakness Stakes in 1873 at Pimlico Race Course in Baltimore, Maryland. Survivor's record winning margin of 10 lengths lasted for 131 years until Smarty Jones won in 2004 by 11 1/2 lengths during his bid for the Triple Crown.

== Background ==
Survivor was bred in Kentucky in 1870 at Ashland Stud, owned by John Morrison Clay. His dam was a mare named Millie J, and he was sired by Vandal, who would go to sire a number of other stakes winners. Survivor was sold for $1,000 to John Chamberlin.

== Racing career ==
Survivor was trained by Allen Davis Pryor, a son of the famous horse trainer John Benjamin Pryor. He started only twice as a two-year-old, not winning either race. Survivor entered his three-year-old season as a maiden.

=== 1873 Preakness Stakes ===
The most important race in Survivor's career was the inaugural running of the Preakness Stakes in 1873. The race, run on May 27, had seven entrants. The race's favorite was Catesby, who'd already set records as a two-year-old. Little was expected of Survivor, whose odds sat at 11–1. However, Survivor, ridden by future hall of fame jockey George Barbee, ended up winning the race by ten lengths, a record that stood until 2004. His final time was 2:43.

=== Later career ===
Following his win in the Preakness, Survivor raced in the Monmouth Cup, coming fourth. Later that year, he won the Sequel Stakes at Monmouth, as well as a match race and a race at Jerome Park.

Survivor missed the 1874 season due to an injury, but returned to racing the following year after being sold to a new owner, A. M. Burton. He started 21 times that year, winning seven. In 1876 he had eight starts, and won five. Overall, Survivor had 37 starts during his career, and won 16.

== Death ==
Survivor died during spring of 1878 in Louisiana. His death was announced on April 13.

== Pedigree ==
Pedigree of Survivor
Sire Vandal 1850	Glencoe I 1831	Sultan	Selim
Sire Vandal 1850	Glencoe I 1831	Sultan	Bacchante
Sire Vandal 1850	Glencoe I 1831	Trampoline	Tramp
Sire Vandal 1850	Glencoe I 1831	Trampoline	Web
Sire Vandal 1850	Tranby Mare 1840	Tranby	Blacklock
Sire Vandal 1850	Tranby Mare 1840	Tranby	Orville Mare
Sire Vandal 1850	Tranby Mare 1840	Lucilla	Trumpator
Sire Vandal 1850	Tranby Mare 1840	Lucilla	Lucy
Dam Millie J Unknown	Lexington 1850	Boston	Timoleon
Dam Millie J Unknown	Lexington 1850	Boston	Sister to Tuckahoe
Dam Millie J Unknown	Lexington 1850	Alice Carneal	Sarpedon
Dam Millie J Unknown	Lexington 1850	Alice Carneal	Rowena
Dam Millie J Unknown	Cripple Mare Unknown	Cripple	Medoc
Dam Millie J Unknown	Cripple Mare Unknown	Cripple	Grecian Princess
Dam Millie J Unknown	Cripple Mare Unknown	Lance Mare	Lance
Dam Millie J Unknown	Cripple Mare Unknown	Lance Mare	Buzzard Mare
