= Hindus (horse) =

American-bred Thoroughbred racehorse

- Sire: Volante
- Grandsire: Grinstead
- Dam: Ignite
- Damsire: Woodlands
- Sex: Colt
- Foaled: 1897
- Country: United States
- Colour: Bay
- Breeder: Bashford Manor Stud
- Owner: George J. Long
- Trainer: John H. Morris
- Record: Not found
- Earnings: Not found

Major wins
- American Classics wins: Preakness Stakes (1900)
- Last updated on 2020-01-08

Hindus (foaled 1897 in Kentucky) was an American Thoroughbred racehorse best known for winning the 1900 Preakness Stakes. Bred and raced by George J. Long, he was sired by Volante, winner of the 1885 American Derby. Hindus was out of the mare Ignite, a daughter of Woodlands.

== Racing career ==
Racing at age two, Hindus ran third to winner Gulden in the 1899 Sapphire Stakes at Sheepshead Bay Race Track.

In his three-year-old season Hindus finished second to Sarmatian in the Broadway Stakes at Gravesend Race Track. He finished seventh in the 1900 Kentucky Derby won by Lieut. Gibson.

=== Preakness Stakes ===
The twenty-fifth running of the Preakness Stakes took place on Tuesday, May 29, 1900, at Gravesend Race Track on Coney Island, New York. On that day Hindus went off as the longest shot on the board at odds of 15-1 in the field of ten stakes winning colts. In that race he broke well with a good start in fourth place under Canadian-born jockey Henry Spencer. Rounding the first turn Hindus dropped back to next to last in eighth place under a strong hold by Spencer. As the race progressed, Hindus laid back in waiting down the entire back stretch and around the final turn. Near the top of the lane Hindus began a big rush and passed all rivals in the last one sixteenth of a mile. In the end Hindus prevailed at the wire by a short head over runner-up Sarmatian. Listed at 6-1 odds, Sarmatian outdistanced third-place finisher Ten Candles by three full lengths. The final time for the one mile and one sixteenth race on dirt was 1:48 2/5 over a fast track. Hindus won almost 70% of the total purse of $2,500 netting $1,900.

== Breeding ==
Pedigree of Hindus
| Sire Volante bay 1882 | Grinstead bay 1871 | Gilroy | Lexington* |
| Sire Volante bay 1882 | Grinstead bay 1871 | Gilroy | Magnolia |
| Sire Volante bay 1882 | Grinstead bay 1871 | Sister to Ruric | Sovereign |
| Sire Volante bay 1882 | Grinstead bay 1871 | Sister to Ruric | Levity |
| Sire Volante bay 1882 | Sister Anne bay 1876 | Glenelg | Citadel |
| Sire Volante bay 1882 | Sister Anne bay 1876 | Glenelg | Babta |
| Sire Volante bay 1882 | Sister Anne bay 1876 | The Nun | Lexington* |
| Sire Volante bay 1882 | Sister Anne bay 1876 | The Nun | Novice |
| Dam Ignite black 1889 | Woodlands ch. 1872 | Nutbourne | The Nabob |
| Dam Ignite black 1889 | Woodlands ch. 1872 | Nutbourne | Princess |
| Dam Ignite black 1889 | Woodlands ch. 1872 | Whiteface | Turnus |
| Dam Ignite black 1889 | Woodlands ch. 1872 | Whiteface | Nan Darrell |
| Dam Ignite black 1889 | Luminous bay 1883 | Alarm | Eclipse |
| Dam Ignite black 1889 | Luminous bay 1883 | Alarm | Maud |
| Dam Ignite black 1889 | Luminous bay 1883 | Lady Lumley | Rataplan |
| Dam Ignite black 1889 | Luminous bay 1883 | Lady Lumley | Schottishe |

* Lexington is inbred 4S x 4S to the stallion Lexington, meaning that he appears fourth generation twice on the sire side of his pedigree.

== See also ==
- Buddhist (horse)
