= Watervale (horse) =

American-bred Thoroughbred racehorse

- Sire: Watercress
- Grandsire: Springfield
- Dam: Lady Violet
- Damsire: The Ill-Used
- Sex: Stallion
- Foaled: 1908
- Country: United States
- Colour: Bay
- Breeder: August Belmont Jr.
- Owner: August Belmont Jr.
- Trainer: John Whalen

Major wins
- Triple Crown Race wins: Preakness Stakes (1911)

Watervale (1908 – 1921) was an American Thoroughbred racehorse of exceptional speed who set two track records in the United States and a national record in Canada.

== Background ==
Bred at August Belmont Jr.'s Nursery Stud near Lexington, Kentucky, Watervale's dam was the retrospective American Champion Two-Year-Old Filly for 1892. His British-born sire, Watercress, was a winner of the 1892 Prince of Wales's Stakes who was imported to the United States by prominent breeder, James Ben Ali Haggin. Watercress also sired the very good filly, Rhine Maiden. His grandsire, Springfield, was bred by Queen Victoria and was a winner of the first two runnings of the July Cup in 1876–1877 at Newmarket Racecourse.

== Racing career ==
Among his races at age two, Watervale won a 6-furlong (0.75 mi; 1.2 km) race for his age group at Sheepshead Bay Race Track and finished third in the Grand Union Hotel Stakes at Saratoga Race Course.

Racing at age three, on May 1, 1911, Watervale equaled the Pimlico track record of 1:12 1/5 for 6 furlongs (0.75 mi; 1.2 km). Ridden by Eddie Dugan, on May 17, 1911, Watervale set another Pimlico track record of 1:51 flat for 1 1/8 miles (1.8 km) in winning an American Classic, the Preakness Stakes. On July 5, 1911, Watervale broke the Canadian record for 9 furlongs (1.1 mi; 1.8 km) when he won the feature race at Fort Erie Racetrack in Fort Erie, Ontario. His winning time of 151 2/5 was achieved despite being slowed by his jockey before the finish line.

== Stud career ==
At stud, Watervale met with limited success as a sire. He was euthanized at the Military Stock Farm after becoming blind in October 1921.

== Pedigree ==
Pedigree of Watervale (USA), bay stallion, 1908
Sire Watercress (GB) 1889	Springfield (GB); 1873	St.Albans	Stockwell
Sire Watercress (GB) 1889	Springfield (GB); 1873	St.Albans	Bribery
Sire Watercress (GB) 1889	Springfield (GB); 1873	Viridis	Marsyas
Sire Watercress (GB) 1889	Springfield (GB); 1873	Viridis	Maid of Palmyra
Sire Watercress (GB) 1889	Wharfedale (GB); 1879	Hermit	Newminster
Sire Watercress (GB) 1889	Wharfedale (GB); 1879	Hermit	Seclusion
Sire Watercress (GB) 1889	Wharfedale (GB); 1879	Bonnie Doon	Rapid Rhone
Sire Watercress (GB) 1889	Wharfedale (GB); 1879	Bonnie Doon	Queen Mary
Dam Lady Violet (USA) 1890	The Ill-Used (GB); 1870	Breadalbane	Stockwell
Dam Lady Violet (USA) 1890	The Ill-Used (GB); 1870	Breadalbane	Blink Bonny
Dam Lady Violet (USA) 1890	The Ill-Used (GB); 1870	Ellermire	Chanticleer (IRE)
Dam Lady Violet (USA) 1890	The Ill-Used (GB); 1870	Ellermire	Ellerdale
Dam Lady Violet (USA) 1890	Lady Rosebery (USA); 1878	Kingfisher	Lexington
Dam Lady Violet (USA) 1890	Lady Rosebery (USA); 1878	Kingfisher	Eltham Lass (GB)
Dam Lady Violet (USA) 1890	Lady Rosebery (USA); 1878	Lady Blessington	Eclipse (GB)
Dam Lady Violet (USA) 1890	Lady Rosebery (USA); 1878	Lady Blessington	Philo (Family: 4-r)
