= Flocarline =

American-bred Thoroughbred racehorse

- Sire: St. Florian
- Grandsire: St. Blaise
- Dam: Carline
- Damsire: King Ban
- Sex: Filly
- Foaled: 1900
- Country: United States
- Colour: Chestnut
- Breeder: C. F. McMeekin
- Owner: Myron H. Tichenor
- Trainer: 1) Henry C. Riddle; 2) Bishop Poole
- Record: Not Found
- Earnings: Not Found

Major wins
- New Rochelle Handicap (1903) Triple Crown wins: Preakness Stakes (1903)
- Last updated on September 23, 2007

Flocarline (foaled 1900) was an American thoroughbred racehorse. She was sired by August Belmont's stakes winner St. Florian, out of the King Ban mare, Carline.

Flocarline is best known as the first filly to ever win the Preakness Stakes. She did it in a time of 1:44 4/5 with William Gannon aboard by a half length over Mackey Dwyer and Rightful.

At three, she placed second in the Broadway Stakes and the Englewood Stakes and third in the Sheridan Stakes.

Flocarline was exported to France in 1910. As a broodmare, she foaled stakes winner Master Robert, who placed second to Fair Play in the Jerome Handicap.

There was a 1 1/16 mile Flocarline Handicap named for her at Pimlico Race Course.
