= Damascus (horse) =

American-bred Thoroughbred racehorse

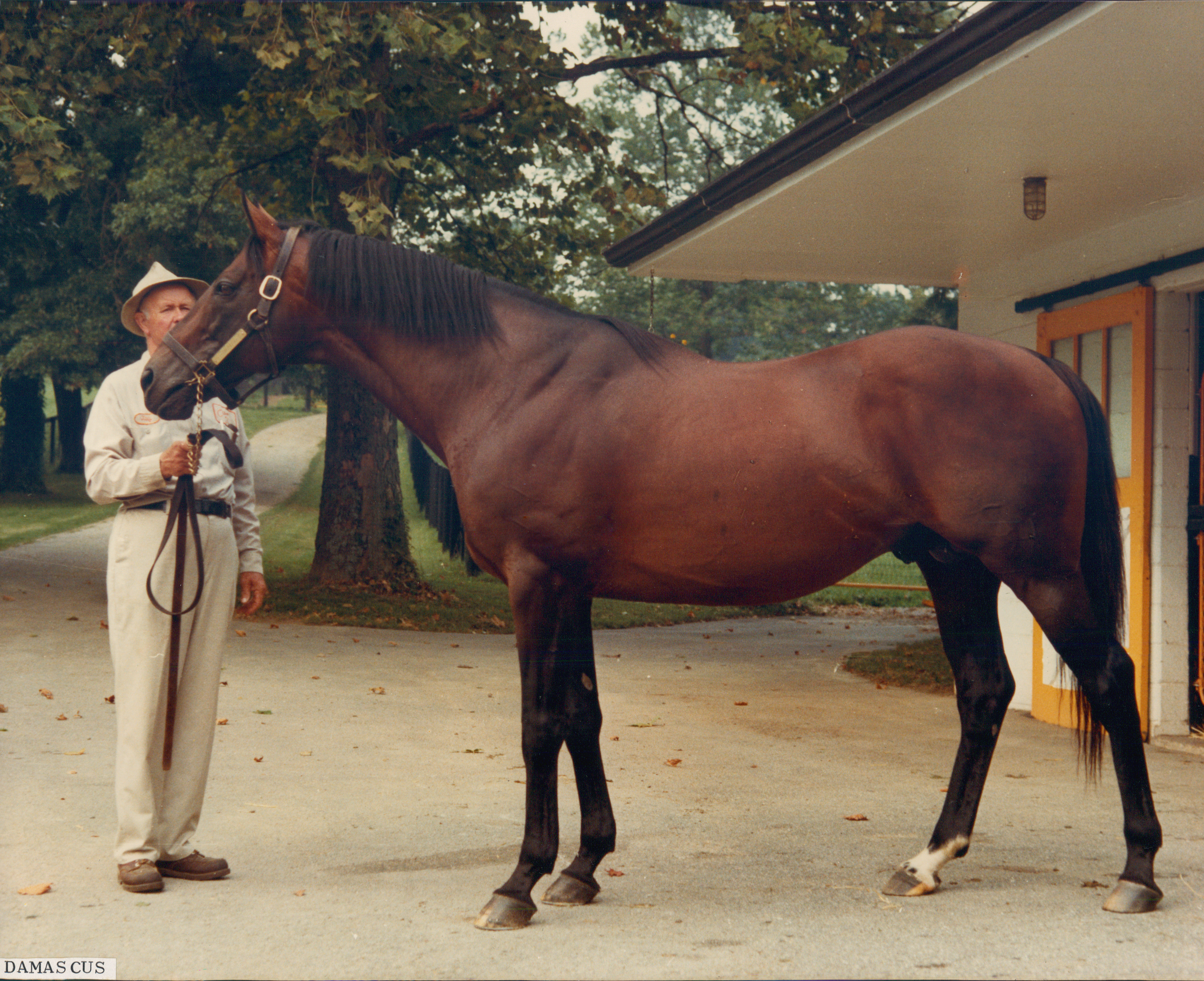
- Damascus at Claiborne Farm in 1981
- Sire: Sword Dancer
- Grandsire: Sun Glow
- Dam: Kerala
- Damsire: My Babu
- Sex: Stallion
- Foaled: April 14, 1964
- Died: August 8, 1995 (aged 31)
- Country: United States
- Colour: Bay
- Breeder: Edith W. Bancroft
- Owner: Edith W. Bancroft
- Trainer: Frank Y. Whiteley Jr.
- Record: 32: 21-7-3
- Earnings: $1,176,781

Major wins
- Remsen Stakes (1966); Jockey Club Gold Cup (1967); American Derby (1967); Aqueduct Handicap (1967, 1968); Wood Memorial Stakes (1967); Woodward Stakes (1967); Dwyer Stakes (1967); Travers Stakes (1967); Leonard Richards Stakes (1967); Bay Shore Stakes (1967); Brooklyn Handicap (1968); San Fernando Stakes (1968); Malibu Stakes (1968); William Dupont Jr. Handicap (1968) Triple Crown Race wins: Preakness Stakes (1967); Belmont Stakes (1967)

Awards
- United States Champion 3-Yr-Old colt (1967); DRF United States Champion Handicap Horse (1967); United States Horse of the Year (1967)

Honours
- U.S. Racing Hall of Fame (1974) #16 - Top 100 U.S. Racehorses of the 20th Century
- Last updated on September 20, 2006

Damascus (April 14, 1964 – August 8, 1995) was a champion American Thoroughbred racehorse who was the 1967 Horse of the Year after winning the Preakness Stakes, Belmont Stakes, Travers Stakes, Jockey Club Gold Cup, Woodward Stakes, and Dwyer Stakes. Damascus also came third in the Kentucky Derby that year.

In a race many consider the "Race of the Century," Damascus won the 1967 Woodward by 10 lengths over both Dr. Fager and Buckpasser after his connections, as well as those of Buckpasser, used stablemates to set a blistering pace that weakened Dr. Fager who never was able to rate. In Blood-Horse magazine List of the Top 100 Racehorses of the 20th Century, Dr. Fager is ranked 6th and Buckpasser is ranked 14th, while Damascus is ranked 16th.

In the Dwyer Stakes, Damascus closed from 12 lengths back and carried 16 pounds more than the second placed horse.

== Background ==
Damascus was sired by Sword Dancer (1959's Horse of the Year) out of Kerala (by My Babu) foaled at the Jonabell Farm in Lexington, Kentucky. He was owned and bred by Edith Woodward Bancroft, whose father, William Woodward Sr., owned Belair Stud and won two Triple Crowns (Gallant Fox in 1930 and Omaha in 1935) and five Belmonts in the 1930s. Edith Bancroft inherited the famed Belair white silks with red polka dots and scarlet cap but never used Belair as a stable name. Damascus was trained by Hall of Famer Frank Whiteley Jr. and ridden by Hall of Fame jockey Bill Shoemaker.

== Racing career ==
A high-strung horse, Damascus was enervated by the humidity and spooked by the crowd noise in the Kentucky Derby, so he was thereafter given a stable pony to calm him.

Damascus won the Travers Stakes by 22 lengths, the Remsen Stakes, the American Derby while setting a track record, the Aqueduct Handicap against older horses and carrying top weight, the Leonard Richards Stakes, the Bay Shore Stakes, the Brooklyn Handicap (beating Dr. Fager, who had beaten him in the Suburban Handicap two weeks earlier), the William Dupont Jr. Handicap, the San Fernando Breeders' Cup Stakes, and the Malibu Stakes.

He bowed a tendon while racing in his second Jockey Club Gold Cup, coming in last, which was the only time in his career he was out of the top three. Whiteley then retired him to stud.

In his three-year-old season, Damascus set an earnings record for a single season ($817,941) that held until Secretariat surpassed it almost a decade later.

Out of 32 lifetime starts, Damascus won 21 times, placed seven times, and came home third three times. His career earnings amounted to $1,176,781. He was inducted into the National Museum of Racing and Hall of Fame in 1974.

== Stud record ==
Damascus' grave at Claiborne Farm.

At stud at Arthur B. Hancock Jr.'s Claiborne Farm near Paris, Kentucky, Damascus sired 71 stakes winners before being pensioned in 1989. He was especially successful with his daughters who produced champions. He died in his paddock at the age of 31 on August 8, 1995, and was buried at Claiborne.

== Breeding ==
Pedigree of Damascus
Sire Sword Dancer ch. 1956	Sunglow ch. 1947	Sun Again	Sun Teddy
Sire Sword Dancer ch. 1956	Sunglow ch. 1947	Sun Again	Hug Again
Sire Sword Dancer ch. 1956	Sunglow ch. 1947	Rosern	Mad Hatter
Sire Sword Dancer ch. 1956	Sunglow ch. 1947	Rosern	Rosedrop
Sire Sword Dancer ch. 1956	Highland Fling brown 1950	By Jimmy	Pharamond
Sire Sword Dancer ch. 1956	Highland Fling brown 1950	By Jimmy	Buginarug
Sire Sword Dancer ch. 1956	Highland Fling brown 1950	Swing Time	Royal Minstrel
Sire Sword Dancer ch. 1956	Highland Fling brown 1950	Swing Time	Speed Boat
Dam Kerala bay 1958	My Babu bay 1945	Djebel	Tourbillon
Dam Kerala bay 1958	My Babu bay 1945	Djebel	Loika
Dam Kerala bay 1958	My Babu bay 1945	Perfume	Badruddin
Dam Kerala bay 1958	My Babu bay 1945	Perfume	Lavendula
Dam Kerala bay 1958	Blade of Time brown 1938	Sickle	Phalaris
Dam Kerala bay 1958	Blade of Time brown 1938	Sickle	Selene
Dam Kerala bay 1958	Blade of Time brown 1938	Bar Nothing	Blue Larkspur
Dam Kerala bay 1958	Blade of Time brown 1938	Bar Nothing	Beaming Beauty

== Notes ==
- Races normally held at Belmont Park, but in the years Damascus raced were held at Aqueduct, are designated by *.
