= Dr. Freeland =

American-bred Thoroughbred racehorse

- Sire: Light Brigade
- Grandsire: Picton
- Dam: Toddle
- Damsire: Celt
- Sex: Stallion
- Foaled: 1926
- Country: United States
- Color: Bay
- Breeder: Walter J. Salmon Sr.
- Owner: 1) Walter J. Salmon Sr. 2) Bennet Creech (11/1931)
- Trainer: Thomas J. Healey
- Record: 139: 25-15-25
- Earnings: US$152,335

Major wins
- Whirl Stakes (1928); Nursery Handicap (1928); Glen Echo Purse (1930); Baltimore Handicap (1931); Yorktown Handicap (1931); Southern Maryland Handicap (1931); New Year's Claiming Handicap (1932); San Diego Handicap (1932) Triple Crown wins: Preakness Stakes (1929)

Dr. Freeland (foaled 1926) was an American Thoroughbred racehorse best known for his win in the Preakness Stakes, the then first leg of the 1929 United States Triple Crown of Thoroughbred Racing. He was named for Dr. John Freeland, a prominent New York City banker.

Trained by U.S. Racing Hall of Fame inductee Thomas J. Healey, Dr. Freeland was bred and raced by Walter J. Salmon Sr., a major New York City real estate developer and owner of Mereworth Farm near Lexington, Kentucky whom Bloodhorse magazine called "one of the leading breeder/owners of the 20th century". It was Salmon's third win of the prestigious race having won it in 1923 with Vigil and in 1926 with Display.

The 1929 Preakness Stakes was run on May 11 with the Kentucky Derby the following Saturday. After Dr. Freeland's win, his owner decided not to run him in the Derby but instead to rest him for the June 29th Belmont Stakes. At a mile and a half, the Belmont proved too much for Dr. Freeland and he finished eighth and last.

On November 29, 1931, Walter Salmon sold Dr. Freeland to Bennet Creech. Dr. Freeland raced into 1935, winning several other minor and mid-level races.

== Pedigree ==
Pedigree of Dr. Freeland
| Sire Light Brigade brown 1910 | Picton ch. 1903 | Orvieto | Bend Or |
| Sire Light Brigade brown 1910 | Picton ch. 1903 | Orvieto | Napoli |
| Sire Light Brigade brown 1910 | Picton ch. 1903 | Hecuba | Isonomy |
| Sire Light Brigade brown 1910 | Picton ch. 1903 | Hecuba | Helen of Troy |
| Sire Light Brigade brown 1910 | Bridge of Sighs bay 1905 | Isinglass | Isonomy |
| Sire Light Brigade brown 1910 | Bridge of Sighs bay 1905 | Isinglass | Dead Lock |
| Sire Light Brigade brown 1910 | Bridge of Sighs bay 1905 | Saint Brigida | St. Simon |
| Sire Light Brigade brown 1910 | Bridge of Sighs bay 1905 | Saint Brigida | Bridget |
| Dam Toddle ch. 1919 | Celt ch. 1905 | Commando | Domino |
| Dam Toddle ch. 1919 | Celt ch. 1905 | Commando | Emma C. |
| Dam Toddle ch. 1919 | Celt ch. 1905 | Maid of Erin | Amphion |
| Dam Toddle ch. 1919 | Celt ch. 1905 | Maid of Erin | Mavourneen |
| Dam Toddle ch. 1919 | Fox Trot ch. 1914 | Star Shoot | Isinglass |
| Dam Toddle ch. 1919 | Fox Trot ch. 1914 | Star Shoot | Astrology |
| Dam Toddle ch. 1919 | Fox Trot ch. 1914 | Passan | Hamburg |
| Dam Toddle ch. 1919 | Fox Trot ch. 1914 | Passan | Pastorella |
