= American thoroughbred racing top attended events =

This is a listing of the top attended stakes races for thoroughbred racing in North America by year.

The chart lists the paid attendance of the eight top average attended races including the Kentucky Derby on Saturday and its companion race the Kentucky Oaks on Friday at Churchill Downs in Louisville, Kentucky; the Preakness Stakes on Saturday and its companion race the George E. Mitchell Stakes on Friday at Pimlico Race Course in Baltimore, Maryland; the Belmont Stakes in Elmont, New York; the Travers Stakes in Saratoga Springs, New York and the Breeders' Cup Classic on Saturday and its companion race the Breeders' Cup Distaff on Friday those locations rotates annually.

Notes:
* – Indicates the largest crowd for that event.
** – In 2015, NYRA announced that all future Belmont Stakes' attendances would be limited to 90,000 due to overcrowding concerns at Belmont Park.
# – The Maryland Jockey Club banned the infield's BYOB policy beginning in 2009. There was a significant decrease in attendance in 2009.
+ – Attendance was limited by COVID-19 Restrictions.

Year	Kentucky Derby Saturday	Preakness Stakes Saturday	Kentucky Oaks Friday	George E. Mitchell Stakes Friday	Belmont Stakes Saturday	Travers Stakes Saturday	Breeders' Cup	
Year	Kentucky Derby Saturday	Preakness Stakes Saturday	Kentucky Oaks Friday	George E. Mitchell Stakes Friday	Belmont Stakes Saturday	Travers Stakes Saturday	Classic Saturday	Distaff Friday
2024	156,710	46,163	-	-	50,000	47,844	-	-
2023	-	46,999	-	-	48,089	48,292	-	-
2022	-	42,055	-	-	46,301	49,672	-	-
2021	51,838 +	10,000 +	41,472 +	10,000 +	11,000 +	44,507	-	-
2020	All races listed held behind closed doors+ (Note: Churchill Downs opened the Fall Meet to spectators. Opening Day drew 1,534 spectators. Prior to the pandemic start, the Pegasus World Cup drew 9,000 spectators.)							
2019	150,729	131,256	105,719	51,573*	56,217	48,213	68,811	41,243
2018	157,813	134,487	113,510	48,265	90,327	49,418	70,423	42,249
2017	158,070	140,327*	105,100	50,339	57,729	47,725	37,692	32,278
2016	167,227	135,256	124,589*	47,956	60,114	48,630	72,811	45,673*
2015	170,513*	131,680	123,763	42,700	90,000**	50,000	50,155	44,947
2014	164,906	123,469	113,071	34,736	102,199	46,577	61,114	37,105
2013	151,616	117,203	113,280	39,957	47,562	47,597	58,795	35,833
2012	165,307	121,309	112,552	32,473	85,811	46,528	55,123	34,619
2011	164,858	118,356	110,122	27,966	55,779	43,050	65,143	40,677
2010	155,804	96,760	116,046	27,609	45,243	45,764	72,739	41,614
2009	153,563	77,850#	110,336	18,407#	52,861	34,221	58,845	37,651
2008	157,770	121,876	100,046	23,819	94,476	40,723	55,331	31,237
2007	156,635	132,221	100,175	25,167	46,870	38,909	69,584	27,803
2006	157,536	128,643	108,065	24,429	61,168	44,199	75,132	not run
2005	156,435	125,687	111,243	23,994	62,274	42,841	54,289	not run
2004	140,054	124,351	98,445	21,876	120,139*	48,894	53,717	not run
2003	148,530	109,931	100,523	n/a	101,864	66,122*	51,486	not run
2002	145,033	117,055	101,932	n/a	103,222	n/a	46,118	not run
2001	154,210	118,926	102,904	n/a	73,857	60,486	52,987	not run
2000	153,204	111,821	106,156	n/a	67,810	n/a	76,043	not run
1999	151,051	116,526	101,034	n/a	85,818	n/a	45,124	not run
1998	143,215	103,269	94,415	n/a	80,162	n/a	80,452*	not run
1997	141,981	102,118	92,547	n/a	70,682	n/a	51,161	not run
1996	142,668	97,751	91,830	n/a	40,797	n/a	42,243	not run
1995	144,110	100,818	87,383	n/a	37,171	48,773	37,246	not run
1994	130,594	99,834	80,321	n/a	42,695	n/a	71,671	not run
1993	136,817	97,641	81,882	n/a	45,037	n/a	55,130	not run
1992	132,543	96,865	79,824	n/a	50,204	n/a	45,415	not run
1991	135,554	96,695	73,785	n/a	51,766	n/a	66,204	not run
1990	128,257	96,106	67,483	n/a	50,123	n/a	51,236	not run
1989	122,653	98,896	67,115	n/a	64,949	n/a	51,342	not run
1988	137,694	88,654	64,735	n/a	56,223	n/a	71,237	not run
1987	130,532	87,945	62,689	n/a	64,772	n/a	57,734	not run
1986	123,819	87,652	58,893	n/a	42,555	n/a	69,155	not run
1985	108,573	81,235	52,865	n/a	43,446	n/a	42,568	not run
1984	126,453	80,566	53,402	n/a	56,677	n/a	64,254	not run
1983	134,444	71,768	54,601	n/a	56,677	n/a	not run	not run
1982	141,009	80,724	52,430	n/a	46,050	n/a	not run	not run
1981	139,195	84,133	51,918	n/a	61,200	n/a	not run	not run
1980	131,859	83,455	49,556	n/a	58,883	n/a	not run	not run
1979	128,488	72,607	47,000	n/a	59,073	n/a	not run	not run
1978	131,004	81,261	n/a	n/a	65,417	50,359	not run	not run
1977	124,038	77,346	n/a	n/a	71,026	n/a	not run	not run
1976	115,387	62,256	n/a	n/a	58,788	n/a	not run	not run
1975	113,324	75,216	n/a	n/a	60,611	n/a	not run	not run
1974	163,628	54,911	n/a	n/a	52,153	n/a	not run	not run
1973	134,476	61,657	n/a	n/a	67,605	n/a	not run	not run
1972	130,564	48,721	n/a	n/a	54,635	n/a	not run	not run
1971	123,284	47,221	n/a	n/a	82,694	n/a	not run	not run
1970	105,087	42,474	n/a	n/a	54,299	n/a	not run	not run
1969	113,200	42,258	n/a	n/a	n/a	n/a	not run	not run
1968	122,600	40,247	n/a	n/a	n/a	n/a	not run	not run
1967	119,700	38,371	n/a	n/a	n/a	n/a	not run	not run
1966	120,500	36,114	n/a	n/a	n/a	n/a	not run	not run
1965	112,000	38,108	n/a	n/a	n/a	n/a	not run	not run
1964	114,300	35,975	n/a	n/a	n/a	n/a	not run	not run
1963	108,900	35,263	n/a	n/a	n/a	n/a	not run	not run
1962	119,650	33,854	n/a	n/a	n/a	n/a	not run	not run
1961	120,500	32,211	n/a	n/a	n/a	n/a	not run	not run
1960	114,850	30,659	n/a	n/a	n/a	n/a	not run	not run
1959	119,650	31,506	n/a	n/a	n/a	n/a	not run	not run
1958	116,400	36,912	n/a	n/a	n/a	n/a	not run	not run
1957	107,950	32,856	n/a	n/a	n/a	n/a	not run	not run
1956	112,000	30,744	n/a	n/a	n/a	n/a	not run	not run
