= Holy Trinity Episcopal Church (Bowie, Maryland) =

Church building in Episcopal Diocese of Washington, United States of America

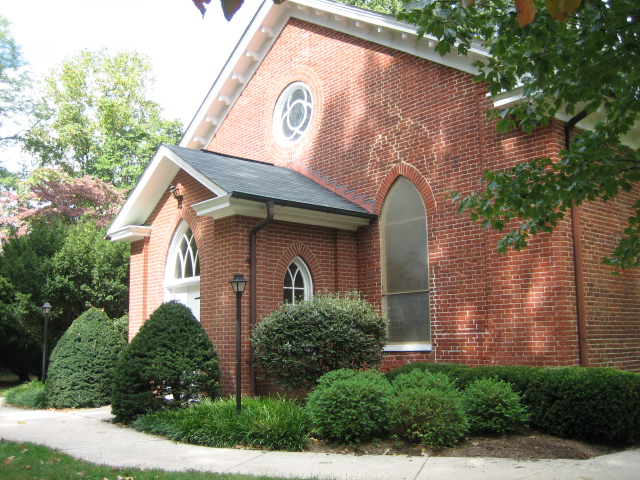

Religion
- Affiliation: Episcopal US
- District: Episcopal Diocese of Washington
- Leadership: Rev. Leslie St. Louis
- Year consecrated: 1842, 1859

Location
- Location: 13106 Annapolis Road; Bowie, Maryland 20720
- Interactive map of Holy Trinity Episcopal Church

Architecture
- Style: Meetinghouse with Gothic Revival features
- Completed: 1842

Specifications
- Direction of façade: west
- Length: 60 feet
- Width: 46 feet
- Materials: brick, wood shingle roof

Website
- http://www.holytrinityepiscopal.church

Holy Trinity Episcopal Church in Collington, Maryland (now part of Bowie, Maryland) is a historic place of worship dating back more than three centuries. Originally a chapel of ease for Queen Anne Parish, it became a separate parish in 1844.

== History ==
On December 17, 1717, Reverend Jacob Henderson was appointed rector of Queen Anne Parish, not long after his appointment by the Bishop of London as Commissary (supervisor) for the parishes in the Western Shore of Maryland (a position he held until 1734). In 1712, Henderson married a widow, Mary Duvall Ridgely (née Stanton). An ancestor of hers, Mareen Duvall, had emigrated from France a century earlier, acquired a significant land grant in what became Prince George's County, Maryland, and established a chapel on their property which became Queen Anne Parish and ultimately St. Barnabas Church, Upper Marlboro, Maryland. In 1713, Henderson and his wife built a wooden chapel near their residence, part of the parcel known as the Forest or Belair, and that chapel became known as Henderson's Chapel.

On January 19, 1735, Mary Henderson died and was buried in Henderson's Chapel, near her ancestor Mareen Duvall. In 1737, Rev. Henderson gave 4 acres (16,000 m^{2}) of land for the use of Queen Anne's Parish called "the Glebe whereon there is a Chapple now standing."

Rev. Jonathan Boucher, an outspoken Loyalist, served as rector of Queen Anne's Parish in 1772-1776, and was driven out and sailed for England during the American War for Independence. His successor from 1780-1788 was Rev. Edward Gantt, a clergyman and physician, who moved to the newly established national capital in Washington, D.C. Rev. Walter Dulany Addison served as Rector from 1793–95, and was succeeded by Rev. Joseph Jackson. However, disestablishment of what became Episcopal Church meant repairs were deferred and the building often vacant, as Bishop Thomas Claggett noted in his visitation in 1814.

In 1827, construction began on a new brick rectory (finished in 1829 under Rev. Steven Tyng and still standing today) and within a decade the original wooden church was replaced with a new brick church. Mary Henderson's remains are still interred in a crypt beneath the church, but the marble slab which covered her grave inside the first chapel was then placed prominently in the exterior east wall of the building.

Pursuant to a restructuring launched a decade earlier, in 1844 Henderson's Chapel became an independent congregation, Holy Trinity Episcopal Church. The congregation's first independent rector, Rev. H.S. Keppler served from 1845-1848, and his successor, Rev. Owen Thackera, until 1851. The first vestry included George Duvall and Robert Bowie, both of whose families had historically worshipped at the site.

The congregation's third independent rector, Reverend Dr. Harvey Stanley (1851-1885), restored the church and secured a baptismal font and other interior furnishing, which led to its rededication by Rt.Rev. William Whittingham in 1859. Unlike his bishop, Rev. Stanley was a southern sympathizer during the American Civil War who helped many Confederates traveling through Maryland.

In 1873, with the help of Rev. Tyng's congregation in New York, and Edmund Bryce DuVal, Caroline DuVal and Rosalie Ogle, Rev. Stanley helped establish St. George's Mission in Glenn Dale. Rev. William Davenport (1883–85) established St. James Mission. Both missions became an independent parish under Rev. William Myers in 1958 and were themselves separated a decade later, St. Georges becoming an independent parish in 2002.

Holy Trinity parish was active during the American Civil Rights Movement.

== Architecture ==
The gabled southern facade of the meetinghouse style building is laid in Flemish bond, with the remainder of the brick structure in common or American 5:1 bond. A chancel was added to the north end of the original church in 1857-58, and in 1964 a brick addition was made surrounding that chancel (which previously had a frame vesting room) and another structure (probably an exterior chimney) was removed, thus creating the current T-shaped structure. The building was repaired and renovated during the rectorship of Rev. W.D. Thomas (installed in 1898), with the Porte-cochère removed and probably also the box pews and balcony formerly accessed by ladder and used by slaves before the Civil War, hence the Gothic Revival features. The current main entrance dates from 1921, when the vestry approved removal of a southern porch and construction of a brick narthex to replace it. Thus, the doors to the east and west are now side doors.

Rev. Stanley installed two stained glass windows in 1863, one in memory of his daughter, and another stained glass window was donated in his memory. Further stained glass was donated at the turn of the century and even during the Great Depression, hence the Gothic Revival aspect. The rose window was installed in 1950, and the current altar dates from 1957. The current organ is a historic instrument, built by the Estey Organ Company in 1908, and installed in this church in 1988 after being rescued from what had been the Washington D.C. Masonic Temple, now the National Museum of Women in the Arts.

The historic rectory is east of the church, and the graveyard to the north. The current parish hall was built in 1964.

== School ==
In 1968 a private elementary school was established on the church grounds. The Parish Hall, which is the oldest section of the Lower School building, was built in 1961. The Day School was originally established in 1963 as a preschool, during the tenure of Rev. Philip R. Baxter. Through continued expansion over the years, the school has grown steadily and now includes the Daisey Lane campus that opened in 1999. As of 2008, the school has a pre-school, Lower School, and Middle School (through grade 8). By 2013 it served 600 students on two campuses.

== Notable members ==
Gabriel Duvall
James T. Woodward

== See also ==
- Episcopal Diocese of Washington
- St. Barnabas Church, Upper Marlboro, Maryland
- Holy Trinity Episcopal Day School
