= Walter Dulany Addison =

Episcopal clergyman from Maryland (1769–1848)

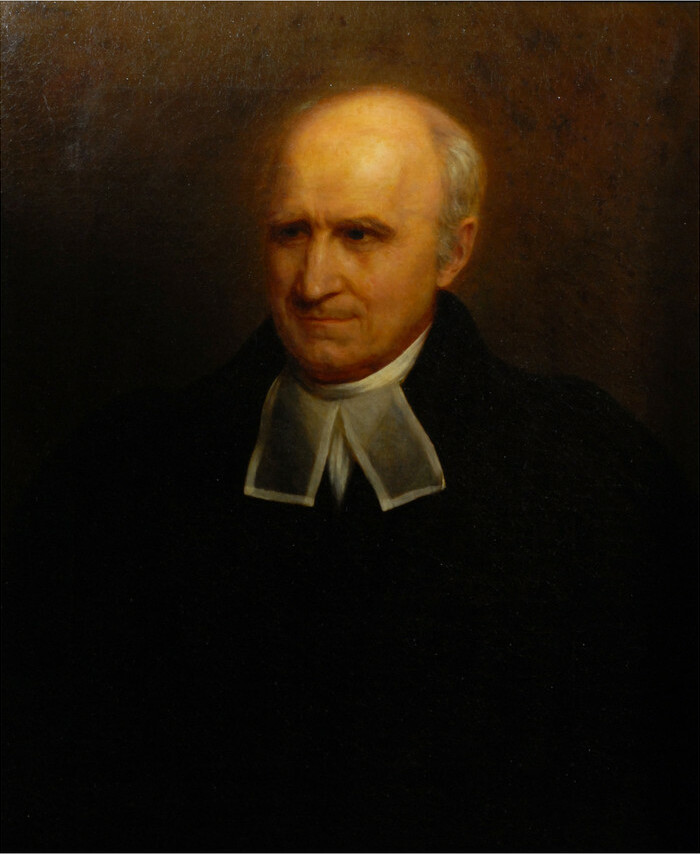
- portrait attributed to Charles Bird King, 1845
- Born: January 1, 1769; Annapolis, Maryland, U.S.
- Died: January 31, 1848 (aged 79); Baltimore, Maryland, U.S.
- Occupation: Clergyman (Episcopal)
- Term: Chaplain of the U.S. Senate (1810–1811)
- Predecessor: Obadiah Bruen Brown
- Successor: John Brackenridge, D.D.
- Spouse: Elizabeth Dulany Hesselius (m. 1792)
- Children: Lloyd Dulany Addison
- Parents: Thomas Covington Addison (father); Rebecca (Dulany) Addison (mother)
- Relatives: Elizabeth H. Murray (granddaughter); Jonathan Boucher (uncle)

Walter Dulany Addison (January 1, 1769 – January 31, 1848) was an Episcopal clergyman who served as Chaplain of the United States Senate (1810–1811).

== Early years ==
Walter Dulany Addison was born at Annapolis, Maryland on January 1, 1769, the son of Thomas Covington Addison and Rebecca Dulany Addison. Their home was Oxon Hill Manor, overlooking the Potomac River opposite Alexandria, Virginia, where the family lived in great state, driving a coach and four with liveried outriders. Along with Mount Airy, Belair, Mount Vernon, Stratford Hall, Mount Clare, Whitehall, and Carlisle House, it was one of the great mansions of the Colonial era. The Addison Plantation, as it is sometimes called, was a large agricultural plantation. Acquired by John Addison in 1687, the site was the estate of successive generations of the Addison family.

When he was fifteen years old, Walter Addison and two of his brothers sailed to England to be educated there under the care of their uncle, Dr. Jonathan Boucher, a Tory who had returned to England during the American Revolution. Addison returned to Maryland in 1789, and studied for the ministry under the direction of Rev. Thomas John Claggett, who ordained him a deacon in Saint Peter's Parish, Talbot County on May 26, 1793.

== Ministry ==
Rev. Addison then became the first priest that Bishop Claggett ordained after his own consecration as Bishop of Maryland in 1793. Rev. Addison thus succeeded his uncle by serving from 1793 to 1795 as rector of Queen Anne Parish, with its two widely separated churches, Holy Trinity and St. Barnabas'.

Rev. Addison soon established a school at his home, Oxon Hill. In 1799 he became assistant rector under Rev. Henry T. Addison, and in 1805 he became rector of St. Matthew's Church, also known as Addison Chapel to commemorate its founder (and both Rev. Addisons' ancestor), Col. John Addison. The current building was erected between 1809 and 1816, under Rev. Walter Addison's direction. Rev. Addison, who freed the slaves he inherited, publicly advocated the abolition of slavery as well as the practice of dueling. He also helped found several Episcopal churches in the new city of Washington, D.C. and Alexandria, Virginia, as well as a black Methodist church in Oxon Hill.

Due to the shortage of Episcopal priests in that era and area, while serving at Addison Chapel, in 1801 Rev. Addison also became the first rector of St. John's Church in Georgetown. Rev. Addison officiated at the funeral of George Washington. He also encouraged William Holland Wilmer and former student (and future Virginia bishop) William Meade in their attempts to school Episcopal clergy, which eventually led to the founding of Virginia Theological Seminary.

In 1810, Addison sold most of the original Oxon Hill property to Zachariah Berry. At the end of the year, December 12, 1810, Rev. Addison was appointed as U.S. Senate Chaplain, succeeding Rev. Obadiah Bruen Brown.

Rev. Addison helped incorporate the Georgetown Lancaster School Society, and also served as vice-president of the Bible Society of the District of Columbia.

== Personal life ==
Walter Dulany Addison married Elizabeth Dulany Hesselius, the daughter of well-known portrait painter John Hesselius and Mary Young, on June 5, 1792, in Anne Arundel County, Maryland. In 1792, the couple leased Battersea House for a year. Elizabeth Addison gave Battersea its new name, Harmony Hall, which it retains to this day. Their children include Lloyd Dulany Addison, who would later move to New Orleans, Louisiana as a merchant and found the Mistick Krewe of Comus and The Pickwick Club.

== Death and legacy ==
Rev. Addison lost his sight during the last decades of his life. He died on January 31, 1848, and was buried in his family's cemetery at Oxon Hill.

To mark the 100th anniversary of Rev. Walter Dulany Addison's ordination, his granddaughter Elizabeth H. Murray wrote, "The oldest parish record spoken of is Piscataway, or Broad Creek, parish, called St. John's, Prince George's County, contiguous to the Potomac and Piscataway Creek, dated January 30, 1693. It contains the name of John Addison, Privy Councilor. His grandson Henry was rector of St. John's for thirty years. He was educated at Oxford, and in the corner of a quaint old portrait of him in the possession of the family is a scroll containing the picture of his college. His parish would have no other rector during his life. A later descendant, Walter Dulaney Addison, became rector in the year 1801. The old Bible and prayer book used by Rev. Henry Addison in this church are still preserved in the family. In them is written: 'Presented to me by the honored Lady, my Mother.'"

His mother was Eleanore Smith, daughter of Colonel Walter Smith.

Religious titles
Preceded by Obadiah Bruen Brown	Chaplain of the United States Senate; December 12, 1810 – November 13, 1811 ^{1}	Succeeded by John Brackenridge, D.D.
Notes and references
1. "Senate Chaplain". www.senate.gov. United States Senate.
