= William Bowie =

William Bowie may refer to:

- Captain William Bowie (1721–?), early colonist in the Province of Maryland, American Revolutionary, member of the Assembly of Freemen and a delegate to the Annapolis Convention
- William Bowie (agrarian) (1776–1826), American agrarian and delegate to the Maryland state convention to charter the Chesapeake & Ohio Canal
- William Bowie (engineer) (1872–1940), American geodetic engineer
- William Bowie (footballer) (1869–1934), Scottish footballer
- William Duckett Bowie (1803–1873), American politician from Maryland
- William Bowie (sculptor) (1926–1994), American sculpture artist
- William Bowie (merchant) (1762–1819), merchant of Halifax, Nova Scotia killed in a duel
