= Jacob Henderson =

Jacob Henderson was an Irish clergyman and philologist who emigrated to the colonial Provinces of Pennsylvania, then Maryland, where he became a prominent land owner and church leader.

== Life before Maryland ==
Very little is known about Henderson before 1710. On 5 June 1710, he was admitted to the Holy Orders by the Bishop of London, Henry Compton and appointed to the Mission at Dover then part of the Province of Pennsylvania and known as Dover Hundred.

In 1711, he traveled to New York and was apparently disturbed by what he observed in the churches there. In June 1712, he returned to England and described the state of the Church of England in New York and New Jersey as unacceptable, and implicating Governor Robert Hunter. While Hunter wrote a written rebuttal to this assessment, it served to raise Henderson's stature.

== Gathering wealth in Maryland ==
In December 1712, Henderson returned to the new world after being appointed to a Mission at Patuxent Hundreds (without a parish).

=== Jacob's first wife Mary (surname unknown) ===
Jacob Henrderson's first wife Mary (surname unknown) was the third and final wife of Mareen Duvall who died in 1694 and she administered his substantial estate. Duvall had purchased sizeable tracts of land, including Catton, later known as Belair as well as owning Middle Plantation in Davidsonville, Maryland.

In 1696, she married Henry Ridgely. In 1700, Ridgely purchased an additional 100 acres (0.40 km^{2}) adjacent to Catton called Enfield Chase. Upon Ridgely's death in 1710, his third wife, now twice widowed, was executrix of the will and received those properties. Mary had previously inherited Middle Plantation in Davidsonville, Maryland when her first husband, Mareen Duvall died in 1694.

Mary married Henderson in 1713, quickly establishing the man as a wealthy landowner.

=== First Parish ===
In 1713, St. Anne's Parish in Annapolis, Maryland had become vacant and Henderson was asked to serve there as well, despite living about 20 miles (32 km) away. He served there for a year.

That same year, he and his wife built a small chapel near their residence at Belair, which was known as Henderson's Chapel or Forest Chapel.

=== Queen Anne Parish and St Barnabas ===
It is not clear if Rev. Johnathan White died in 1717 or was removed from the position as Rector of Queen Anne Parish. On 17 December 1717, Reverend Jacob Henderson was appointed as rector of Queen Anne Parish.

== End of in Mission at Patuxent ==
In 1723, the Bishop of London, Dr. John Robinson died, and his successor, Dr. Edmund Gibson chose not to renew Henderson's appointment to the Mission. Henderson then focused exclusively on the Parish.

== Mission of the Colony ==
In 1729, Henderson traveled to England for 18 months to discuss the difficulties he found in the Colonies. When he returned, he had been appointed to the overall Mission of the Colony. The clergy welcomed his return, but the Laity were bitterly opposed.

He then convened the Conventions of the Clergy on both the western and eastern shores of the Province. Over the next several years, he focused on the issue of discipline and profligacy among the clergy. This met with a great deal of resistance and by 1734, he resigned his appointment, being the last representative of the Bishop in the Colony.

== Death of his first wife Mary, his remarriage to Mary (nee Stanton), and Holy Trinity Church ==
On 19 January 1735/6, Henderson's wife Mary was buried, her death date being unknown. She was buried in Henderson's Chapel. In 1737, Henderson gave the chapel and 4 acres (16,000 m^{2}) of land for the use of Queen Anne's Parish called "the Glebe whereon there is a Chapple now standing." Almost 100 years later, in 1836 Henderson's Chapel became an independent congregation, Holy Trinity Episcopal Church.

After the death of his first wife Mary, Jacob Henderson secondly married Mary (Stanton) on 2 November 1740. who at the time was the widow of Robert Tyler. She was the widow successively of a Mr. Dodd and of Robert Tyler, whom she had married on 12 June 1718 as Mary [the widow] Dodd.

== Later voyages to England ==
By this time, Henderson had become good friends with Provincial Governor Samuel Ogle. On 30 March 1737, for the sum of £500, Henderson sold three parcels of land to Ogle for him to build his Governor's estate.

On 6 July 1737, Ogle granted Henderson leave of absence from the Province for 18 months to return to England. During this leave, Henderson was elected to the Society for the Propagation of the Gospel and returned to Maryland in May 1739. Nine years later, in August 1748, Ogle granted Henderson another leave of 18 months for England. Henderson returned for the final time in April 1750.

== Death, Legacy, and Death of his second wife Mary (nee Stanton) ==
Henderson died on 27 August 1751, after 34 years of service at St. Barnabas and Queen Anne. After specific bequests to family members and friends, he bequeathed the residue to the Society for the Propagation of the Gospel. The inventory of his estate was valued at 1423 pounds, 8 shillings, 8 pence. An additional inventory added another 41 pounds, 10 shillings, 9 pence. The distribution to the Society for the Propagation of the Gospel was made in two payments. One was for 62 pounds, 17 shillings, 5 pence. The second was for 43 pounds, 4 shillings, and 10 pence. His will had been written on 4 August 1751 and probated on 26 October 1751. His wife Mary (née Stanton) wrote her will on 2 October 1761 and was probated on 18 February 1762 in Prince George's County, Maryland. In her will she styled herself as "widow of The Rivirend Mr. Jacob Henderson, late of Prince George's Co. decd." Among her bequests were ones to her "son-in-law" [step-son] Robert Tyler and to Daniel Stanton, son of my brother Daniel Stanton (my sd. nephew lately living in Philadelphia).

== See also ==
- St. Barnabas Church
