= Queen Mab (horse) =

British-bred Thoroughbred racehorse

- Sire: Musgrove Grey Arabian
- Sex: Mare
- Country: England
- Owner: Frederick Calvert, 6th Baron Baltimore, Hon. Samuel Ogle
- Record: unknown
- Earnings: unknown

Queen Mab was one of the first pair of English-bred Thoroughbred horses imported to the Province of Maryland in 1747 by Provincial Governor of Maryland, Samuel Ogle.

Queen Mab was given to Ogle by Lord Baltimore during Ogle's trip to England in 1740. The importation of Queen Mab and Spark established the Belair Stud legacy.

== Progeny ==
- Hoppers Pacolet, grey colt 1750. Sired by Spark
- Gantts Mille, brown mare 1752. Sired by Spark

== See also ==
- Belair Mansion (Bowie, Maryland)
- Belair Stable Museum (Bowie, Maryland)
