= Fairview Plantation =

Fairview Estate
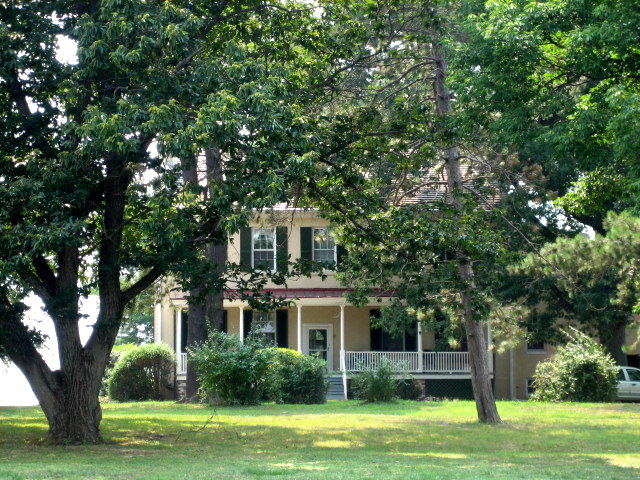
- Fairview Manor in August 2007

- Location within Maryland

General information
- Architectural style: Federal/Greek Revival plantation home
- Location: Fairwood, Maryland, United States
- Coordinates: 38.95167°N 76.78417°W
- Completed: c. 1790
- Client: Baruch Duckett

Fairview construction began around the year 1788 on an expanse of land owned by Baruch Duckett in Collington, Maryland (now the census-designated place of Fairwood). The house is a transitional federal/Greek Revival design considered to be a significant part of the Prince George's County heritage. Fairview is a two-story stuccoed brick plantation house with flush end chimneys and a unique stepped gable at one gable end. Its Georgian plan interior features fine Federal style trim.

== History ==
Upon his death in 1810 at Fairview, Duckett left the estate to his son-in-law, Captain William Duckett Bowie. The will stipulated that William Duckett Bowie and his sons should have Fairview as long as they did not cut down certain trees standing near the house but "if the said Bowie, or any of his children should fell the trees, then the property shall go to my brother, Isaac Duckett." Bowie's son, Governor of Maryland Oden Bowie, was born at Fairview in 1826 and was buried on the grounds in 1894.

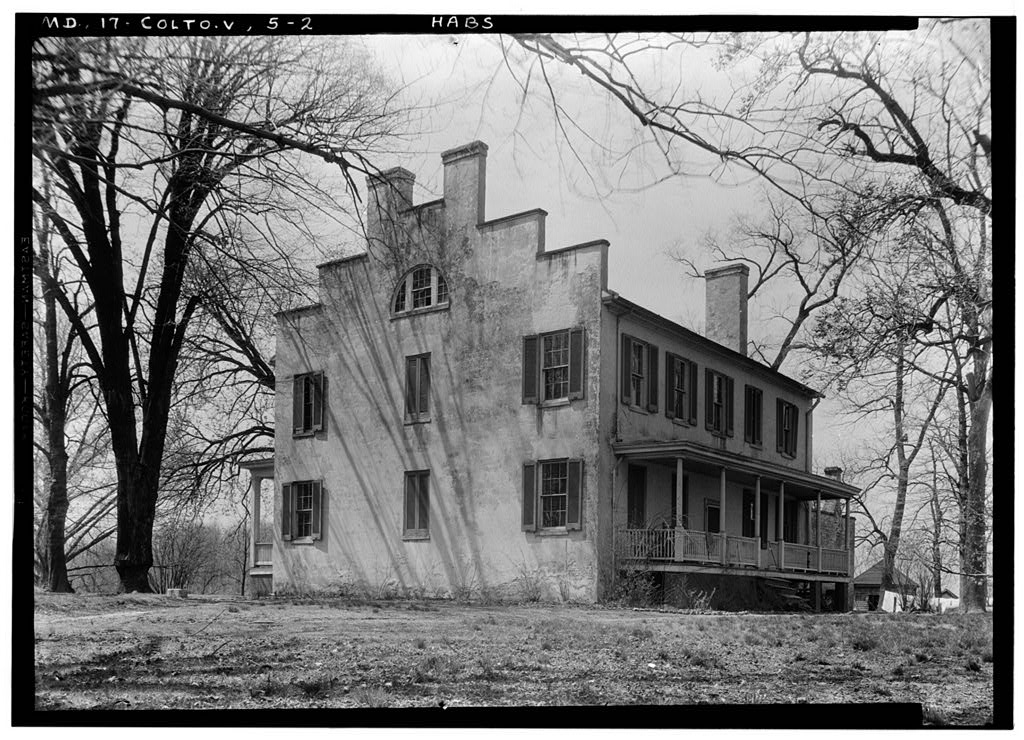
Fairview in 1936

Fairview was one of the larger slave-holding plantations in the county, tended by over 100 enslaved at its production height; 47 during Oden Bowie's ownership.

In the 1980s, land that made up the plantation consisted of a turf farm and woods. The owners of the estate sold most of the land to The Rouse Company who built a housing development that bears the name Fairwood on the site. While not currently on National Register of Historic Places, the Maryland National Capital Park and Planning Commission is the local authority and considers the house and cemetery to be a historic site, #71A-13.

Descendants of Baruch Duckett remained in residence until 2017, when Fairview was offered for sale for the first time in its history. The home has exchanged ownership multiple times and is now under the care of Fairview Manor, LLC.

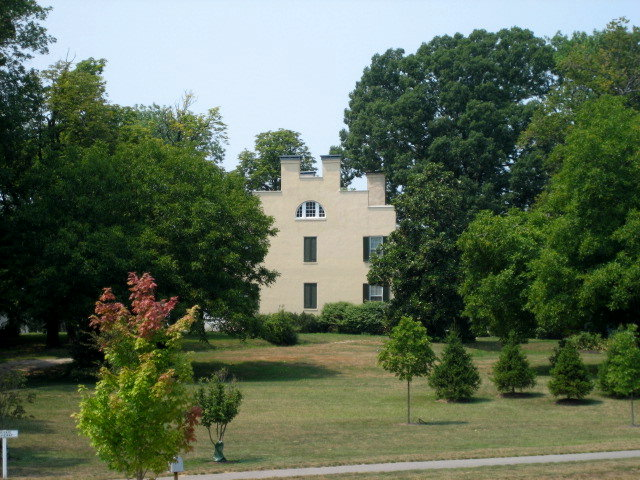
Fairview Plantation in August 2007

== Thoroughbred racing ==
Oden Bowie, perhaps inspired by Samuel Ogle's nearby Belair Stables and the Belair Stud, founded a stable at Fairview that produced successful race horses including Belle D'Or, Oriole and Crickmore.
