= Collington, Maryland =

Collington
- defunct settlement
- Location within the state of Maryland
- Coordinates: 38°58′6″N 76°45′35″W
- Country: United States of America
- State: Maryland
- County: Prince George's
- Time zone: UTC-5 (Eastern (EST))
  - Summer (DST): UTC-4 (EDT)
- GNIS feature ID: 597266

Collington was a settlement in Prince George's County, Maryland, United States, dating from colonial times. Collington has been subsumed by the city of Bowie.

== Geography ==
Collington was located at 38°58'6" North, 76°45'35" West (38.9684441 -76.7596914).

Collington stretched from the area near Holy Trinity Episcopal Church on MD 450 East toward the Belair Mansion, south to where MD 197, also called Collington Road, ends at US 301 and west past Church Road.

== History ==
Originally referred to as "Collington Hundreds", the settlement was more recently known as "Collington".

One of the earliest references to Collington, is in the proceedings of the Council of Maryland from 1696:

"An Accot [sic] of the Hundreds in the Severall [sic] Counties of the Province Vizt ...

Prince Georges County is divided into Six Hundreds Vizt

Mattapany
Petuxant
Collington

1 Hundreds.

Mount Calvert
Piscattoway
New Scotland"

=== Significant historic buildings in Collington ===
In 1746, Colonial Governor of Maryland, Samuel Ogle built the Belair Mansion and Belair stables, in Collington, establishing his residence and the Belair Stud Farm.

Baruch Duckett built Fairview Plantation around 1790 in Collington. Maryland Governor Oden Bowie was born at Fairview in 1826 and is buried there.

Holy Trinity Episcopal Church was established in Collington in 1836.

== Transportation ==
The southern segment of Maryland Route 197 is known as Collington Road.

James Mullican was appointed as the first overseer of roads in the Colony of Maryland, appointed in April 1696. In 1715, the court ordered the overseer of Collington Hundreds to construct a road from St. Barnabas' Church through the plantation owned by James Mullikin to Collington Bridge. An additional segment was ordered at the same time for a road to connect from Collington Bridge to James Ridgeley's cart road at the Patuxent River at Sturgeon's Landing.

Governor's Bridge over the Patuxent River was built by Governor Samuel Ogle in the mid-18th century to travel between his mansion in Collington and the state capital in Annapolis.

The Baltimore & Potomac Railroad Company had a passenger and freight station eponymously named Collington on the Pope's Creek spur of its Southern Maryland Line, 4 miles south of Bowie Station. Today, a 5200 foot long railroad siding is all that remains of this stop although the spur is still in use. It is located at mile post 3.0 on the spur just south of where the spur crosses under Maryland Route 450 near Maryland Route 197.

== Geology ==
Collington is known for its fine sandy loam soil on the surface making the area exceptional for agriculture. In the early 20th century almost 85% of the area was under cultivation for corn, wheat and tobacco with the remainder consisting of hardwood forest.

Below the topsoil lies layers of yellowish brown sandy clay and clay down to 48 inches.

== See also ==
- Collington Branch
- Foxhill Park
