= Belair Mansion (Bowie, Maryland) =

Historic house in Maryland, US

- U.S. National Register of Historic Places
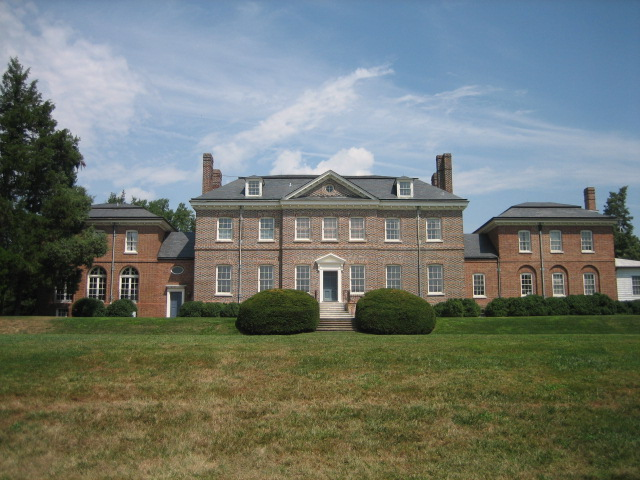
- Front of Belair Mansion, August 2007
- Location: 12207 Tulip Grove Drive in Bowie, Maryland, US
- Coordinates: 38°57′57″N 76°44′48″W
- Area: Architecture, Landscape Architecture, Politics/Government, Social History
- Built: c. 1745
- Architect: Benjamin Tasker Sr. (original); Delano & Aldrich (1914 expansion)
- Architectural style: Georgian plantation house
- NRHP reference No.: 77001520
- Added to NRHP: September 16, 1977

The Belair Mansion, located in the historic Collington area and in Bowie, Maryland, United States, built c. 1745, is the Georgian style plantation house of Provincial Governor of Maryland, Samuel Ogle. Later home to another Maryland governor, the mansion is listed on the National Register of Historic Places.

Belair is recognized as the only great colonial estate where breeding of race horses was conducted over the course of three centuries. The estate significantly influenced the development of thoroughbred horse racing in the New World, having one of only two stables to raise two Triple Crown champions. The mansion and its nearby stables both serve as museums, operated by the City of Bowie.

== History ==
=== Early history ===
The original estate was 500 acres (2.0 km^{2}) called Catton and was patented from the first proprietors of the Maryland Colony, the Calvert family, on August 26, 1681, by Robert Carvile of St. Mary's City, Maryland. Carvile sold the land in 1698 for £100 to Henry Ridgley. In 1700, Ridgley purchased an additional 100 acres (0.40 km^{2}) adjacent to Catton called Enfield Chase. Upon Ridgley's death in 1710, his third wife, now twice widowed, Mary Ridgley (Duvall, née Stanton) was executrix of the will and inherited the properties. Mary had previously inherited Middle Plantation in Davidsonville, Maryland when her first husband, Mareen Duvall died in 1699.

Reverend Jacob Henderson, became rector of Queen Anne's Parish in 1712 and married Mary Duvall that same year.

In 1718, Henderson believed that Benjamin Cheney and Joseph Cheney had "committed some trespass" so on January 20, 1718, Henderson petitioned the Maryland Land office to resurvey the boundaries of his properties. As a result, in 1721, a new deed was issued to a much larger 1,410 acres (5.7 km^{2}) and the property was renamed Belair (sometimes written as Bel Air).

=== Ogle era ===
Samuel Ogle, son of Samuel Ogle of Northumberland, descended from the Barons Ogle was appointed by Charles Calvert, 5th Baron Baltimore to be Governor of Maryland in Annapolis in 1732. As part of his remuneration, Ogle was given £3,000 to build a residence but Ogle, then a bachelor, was in no hurry to do so.

==== Ogle family ownership begins ====
Henderson sold the land along with two other parcels known as Woodcock's Range and Enfield Chase to two partners, Ogle, and Benjamin Tasker Sr. on March 30, 1737, for the sum of £500.

In August, that same year, Ogle bought Tasker's half of the property. In 1739, the 47-year-old Ogle married his former partner's 18-year-old daughter, Anne Tasker.

==== Construction to Revolution ====
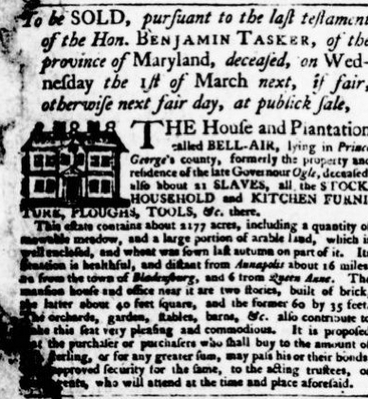
Newspaper advertisement for the sale of Tasker's estate Belle Air

In 1740, Ogle was dispatched to England following England's declaration of war against Spain and left Tasker with power of attorney and "the task of supervising the construction of a new house at Belair." In 1747, Ogle returned to Maryland with his new bride to occupy his new home which was "the grandest in the region" visible from much of the surrounding area and "affording its owners a magnificent, all-encompassing view of their plantation." Ogle brought with him, two famous English horses and the first English-bred Thoroughbreds imported into Maryland, Queen Mab and Spark, both gifts of Lord Baltimore, establishing the Belair Stud.

The Ogle family maintained two residences upon return, one in town at the intersection of King George Street and College Avenue in Annapolis (now referred to as Ogle Hall, which houses the US Naval Academy's Alumni Hall) and Belair, the Governor's country seat. Upon his death in 1752, Samuel Ogle left the following to his 3 year old son Benjamin Ogle:

His "house and land in Prince George's County ... together with my stock of whit kind soever and horses (except the English horses and their breed which I desire may be sold) and every implement and utensil to or used on my said plantation".

Samuel Ogle had also named Tasker to be his son's guardian and manage the estate. At the age of 10, Benjamin Ogle was sent to England for formal education and returned 11 years later in 1770 to find Tasker's daughters and their husbands living in the estate. Ogle sued to have ownership and occupy the mansion. The court ruled in his favor in 1774 and he took possession of the estate.

Benjamin Ogle became a friend of George Washington whose presidential records show he dined at Belair on October 1, 1773, and that Washington frequently sought Ogle's counsel.

==== Post Revolution to Civil War ====
Benjamin Ogle operated Belair and gained prominence as a gentleman. He was elected Governor of Maryland in 1798. That same year the Direct Federal Tax assessment listed Belair as containing:

"a mansion with a greenhouse, 24 by 15 feet, adjoining the 40-foot (12 m) square kitchen-office, a 12-foot (3.7 m) square poultry house, a single-story dwelling, 2 by 16 feet, a meat house and a stable, all built of brick. Additional outbuildings included a frame stable, a deer house, tobacco houses and several houses for Negroes. It was by far the most valuable and best equipped plantation of that section of Prince George's County.

He continued to prosper until his death in 1809 when the property was inherited by his son, Benjamin Ogle II. Ogle II operated the estate and stud farm until his death in 1844 when his two sons, George Cooke Ogle and Richard Lowndes Ogle divided the estate into two parcels. George took the parcel with the mansion and Richard moved to a house on his parcel known as Bladen (which was torn down in the 1960s to make way for the Kenilworth Elementary School). When George took possession of the deed to Belair, it carried an interesting restriction: George's youngest sister, Rosalie Ogle, must be able to remain in her room in the mansion as long as she remained single. She chose a large room of 17 by 20 feet on the upper floor.

==== Civil War and end of Ogle ownership ====
As Belair was a slave-operated plantation, the ratification of the Maryland Constitution of 1864 which emancipated the slaves in the state effectively ended its operation as a plantation. In 1867, Dr. George C. Ogle reported to the Maryland State Commissioner of Slave Statistics that he had freed 41 slaves, 24 of them 18 years or younger. Belair, like other plantations, was "possessed of huge tracts of land but suddenly without the built-in workforce to make them productive, they were often unable to meet mortgage debts or to pay taxes." By 1870, the house had fallen into bad repair and George Ogle was in debt of $7,400 to his brother-in-law William Henry Tayloe of Virginia as well as several lesser debts to others including $2,400 to the estate of Maria Jackson, being executed by James Mullikin. In 1871 Ogle defaulted on the latter debt, Mullikin filed suit and the court ruled the Belair be sold to satisfy the debt. The property was described in the auction notices as:

"550 acres, more or less, and in one of the finest farms in Prince George's County. It lies along the line of the Baltimore and Potomac Railroad about one-quarter of a mile from Collington, where there will be a Depot on said road. The improvements are a large, two story brick dwelling house, 3 tobacco houses, corn house, granary, stables, servants' house, etc. The soil is well adapted to the growth of tobacco, corn, wheat, etc. Wood and water abundant."

The property was sold to the executors of the estate of the mortgage holder, William Henry Tayloe on May 16, 1871. The winning bidders were Thomas Munford and Henry Augustine Tayloe II who paid $5,100 but the contingency remained on the deed and Rosalie Ogle remained in the house. When tenant farmers moved in the mansion alongside Rosalie, she took them to court stating that she could not live in a house with people so far below her station. In 1877, she was awarded a cash settlement, and the last of the Ogle family retreated to Baltimore.

=== Changing hands ===
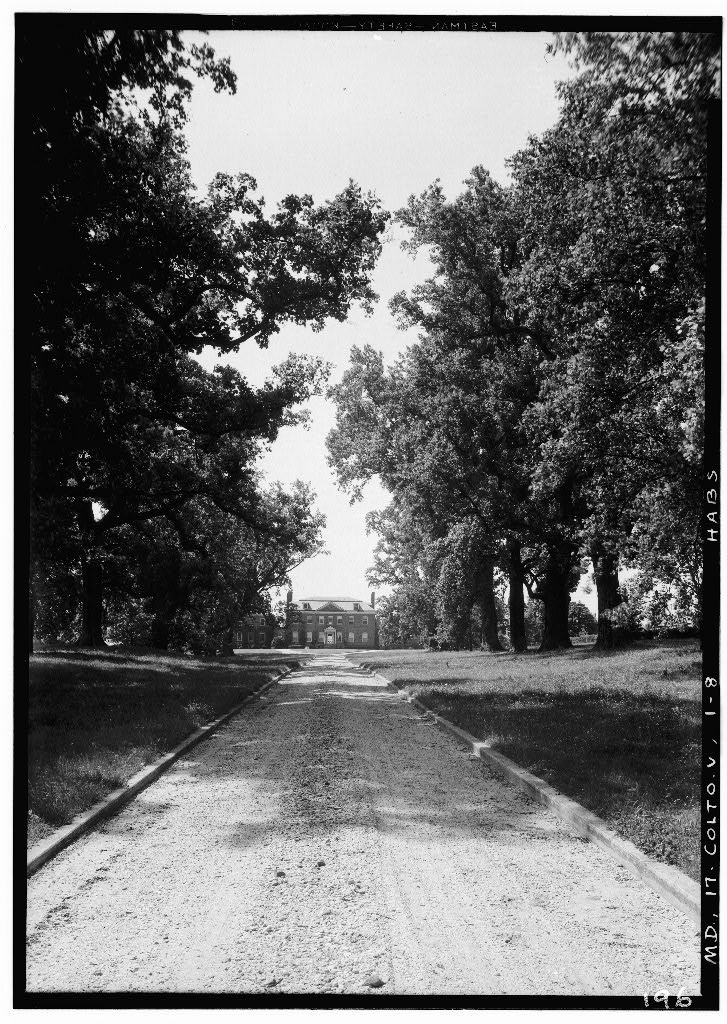
Belair in 1936

In 1877, Munford and Tayloe sold the property for $17,000 (~$460,726 in 2024) to Edward T. Rutter. Belair subsequently changed hands numerous times while it continued to fall further into disrepair. The property was divided into smaller parcels, some of which were then recombined. By 1896, ownership of most of the land had passed to Benjamin N. Hardisty.

=== Woodward era ===
==== James T. Woodward ====
In 1898, Hardesty's land was surveyed to be 371.4 acres (1.503 km^{2}) including the mansion and the stables and was purchased for $10 and an undisclosed sum by wealthy banker James T. Woodward. James maintained residences in New York, Rhode Island as well as at Belair. During this time, he developed a very close relationship with Saint John's College in Annapolis and was elected to its board of visitors. Woodward invested significantly in both repairing Belair and expanding St. John's during this time. He died in 1910 having never married.

==== William Woodward Sr. ====
His nephew, wealthy lawyer and banker, William Woodward Sr. inherited the estate in 1910 and expanded the building in 1914 to a five-part house by the additions of two wings and hyphens. The expansion became a noted work of the architects Delano & Aldrich. During this period, William opportunistically bought up adjacent tracts of land including purchases from the Magruder family and the nearby Fairview Plantation of Oden Bowie and began developing the Belair Stud.

In 1918, he entered his first two-year-olds into competition, and in 1923 Sunny Jim Fitzsimmons arrived at Belair as trainer who eventually brought the Belair Stud two Triple Crown champions, a feat matched by only one other stable. Woodward died in 1953, leaving the estate to his son William Woodward Jr.

==== William Woodward Jr. ====
Woodward Jr. became an avid horse racing enthusiast. After his father's death, he took over operation of Belair for a brief period before he was fatally shot in his Oyster Bay, New York estate by his wife in 1955.

=== Belair development ===
By the time of Woodward Jr's death, the estate had grown back to 2,280 acres (9.2 km^{2}); it was purchased at auction by Levitt and Sons in August 1957 for $1,750,000 (~$14.9 million in 2024). Levitt used the building and the stables as corporate offices as they developed their suburban housing development, "Belair at Bowie." In 1964, Levitt sold the mansion and 5.5894 acres (22,619 m^{2}) of land including the Ogle cemetery to the City of Bowie for the price of $1 to be used as City Hall as well as what became Foxhill Park. Bowie's city hall relocated out of the mansion in 1978.

=== Museum operation ===
The mansion, located at 12207 Tulip Grove Drive in Bowie, Maryland, is owned by the City of Bowie and functions as a museum, as does the nearby Belair Stable Museum. Both the mansion and stables are listed separately on the National Register of Historic Places.

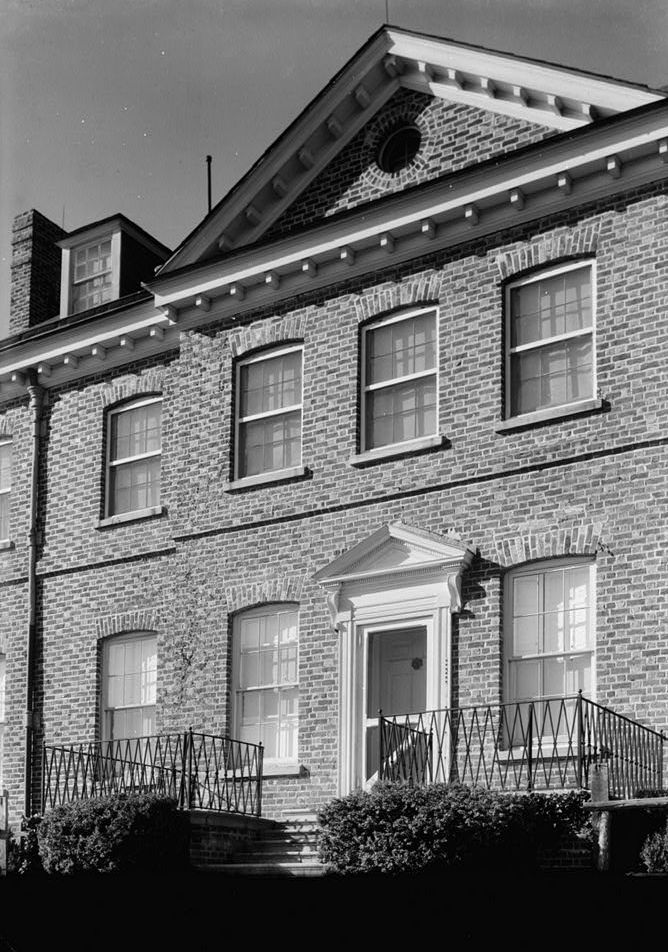
Detail of central section, 1936

== Architectural details ==
Based on Palladian architecture stressing symmetry, the original structure has two long façades featuring a central door and balanced number of windows on each side. Four chimneys support nine fireplaces.

From the National Register of Historic Places Inventory Nomination Form:

"The principal or garden façade faces south and is seven bays in length. The central bays are set in 2 ½ -story, pedimented pavilion which has a bull's-eye window set within the pediment. The north façade has a pediment, but no projecting pavilion. All first and second floor windows have segmental arches of alternating header and stretcher brick and contain 6/6/ sash. Between the two floor levels a brick belt course with molded cap extends around all four elevations.

The north, west, and east elevations are laid in English bond while the south façade is of Flemish bond with glazed headers. The water-table is laid in English bond on all elevations. There is a heavy modillion cornice on all elevations; roof pediments at both the front and rear façades display the same treatment. The roof plan is a hip-on-hip; there is a hip roofed dormer window on both side elevations and one on each side of the pediment on the south façade.

The house is set high on a brick foundation, and the water table has a chamfered top course. The chimneys at the east and west ends are contained within the walls but project slight from the outside surface of each.

The entrance door of the south façade has a pediment supported by scroll brackets and trimmed with dentil molding and is framed by fluted pilasters. The main entrance of the north façade has a simple frame with fluted pilasters, but is sheltered by a fine pedimented portico with dentil cornice supported by tapered columns with Ionic capitals."

== Cemetery ==
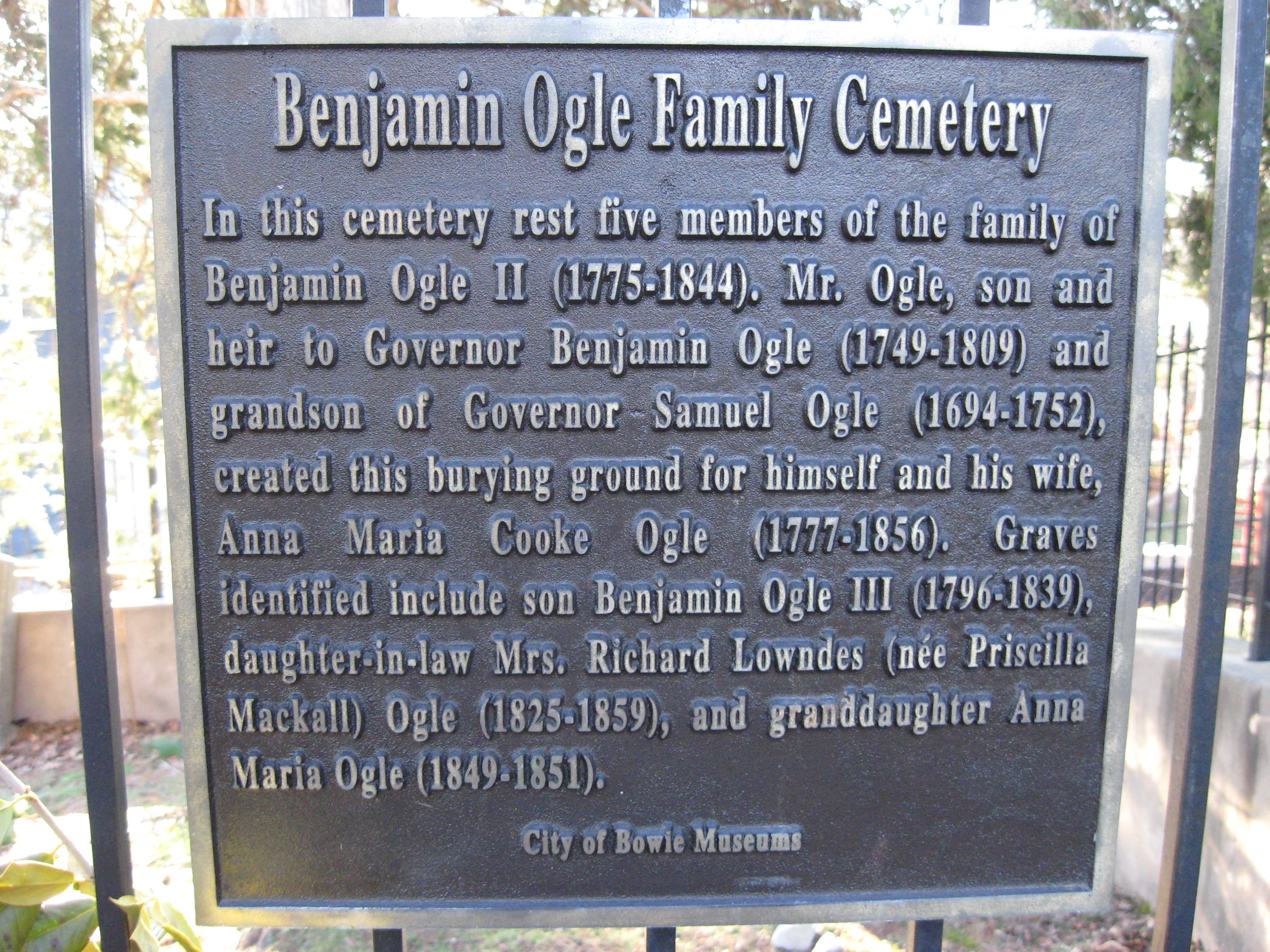
Benjamin Ogle Family Cemetery

At the edge of the mansion grounds is a small cemetery containing the grave of Benjamin Ogle II whose tombstone states that he died on April 4, 1845 while other sources have him dying in 1844.

Others interred:

- Ogle II's wife Anna Maria Cooke Ogle (1777–1856)
- Benjamin Ogle III (1796–1839) who committed suicide following financial failure.
- Priscilla Mackall Ogle (1825–1859)
- Anna Maria Ogle (1849–1851)

== See also ==
- Foxhill Park
- Belair Stable Museum
- Belair Stud

== Bibliography ==
- Harrison, Fairfax; Lasker, Edward; Lasker, Cynthia (1929). The Belair Stud 1747–1761. Richmond, Virginia: Old Dominion Press. ISBN 9780598509536. OCLC 3367781.
- McGraw, Eliza (March 3, 2007). "Keeping it Alive: Belair Stable Museum recalls the glory days of Maryland Racing". The Blood-Horse (9): 1338–1354.
- Remly, Lynn L. (Fall 2002). "Art Among the Oats: Belair Stable Museum". Equine Images. 2000 (81): 5–56.
