= Middle Plantation =

Middle Plantation may refer to:

- Middle Plantation (Davidsonville, Maryland) a plantation in Maryland near the South River
- Middle Plantation (Virginia) a settlement in Virginia between the James River and York Rivers
  - Treaty of Middle Plantation, a 1677 treaty signed in the settlement
