= Foxhill =

Foxhill may refer to:

- Foxhill, a hamlet in Wanborough parish, Wiltshire, England
  - Foxhill motocross circuit
- Foxhill House, a historic house within Wokingham District but near the town of Reading, Berkshire, England
- Foxhill Park, a regional park in Bowie, Maryland
  - Foxhill Park Bridge, an historic bridge in the park
- Foxhill, a locality in Combe Down, Bath, England

== See also ==
- Fox Hill (disambiguation)
- Fox Hills (disambiguation)
