= George Walter Thornbury =

British writer (1828-1876)

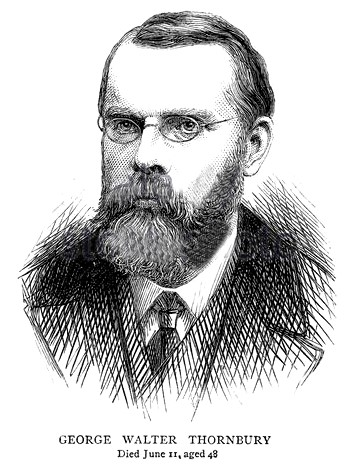
George Walter Thornbury

George Walter Thornbury (13 November 1828 – 11 June 1876) was an English author. He was the first biographer of J. M. W. Turner.

== Early life ==
George Thornbury was born on 13 November 1828, the son of a London solicitor, reared by his aunt and educated by her husband, Reverend Barton Bouchier.

== Career ==
A journalist by profession, he also wrote verse, novels, art criticism and popular historical and topographical sketches. He began his career in 1845 with contributions to Bristol Journal and wrote later mainly for the Athenaeum.

His first major work was Lays and Legends; or, Ballads of the New World (1851). It followed a history of the Buccaneers, Monarchs of the Main, (1855), Shakespeare's England; or, Sketches of our Social History in the reign of Elizabeth (1856, 2 Vols.) and Art and nature at home and abroad (1856, 2 Vols.). His Old and New London: a Narrative of its History, its People, and its Places was first published in 2 volumes in 1872, and in an undated edition of 1878 in 6 volumes, the last four being by Edward Walford.

== Death ==
Thornbury died of overwork at Camberwell House Asylum, London, at the early age of 47, and was buried in Nunhead Cemetery. He was survived by a young wife and three young sons.

== Works ==
=== Poetry ===
- Lays and Legends; or, Ballads of the New World (1851)
- Songs of Cavaliers and Roundheads (1857)
- Two centuries of song (1867)
- Historical and legendary ballads and songs (1875)
- The Fables of La Fontaine (translator, c. 1870)

=== Novels and stories ===
- Every man his own trumpeter (1858)
- Icebound (1861)
- True as steel (1863, 3 Vols.)
- Wildfire (1864)
- Tales for the marines (1865)
- Greatheart (1866)
- The vicar's courtship (1869)
- Old stories retold (1869)

=== Nonfiction writing ===
- Shakespeare's England; or, Sketches of our Social History in the reign of Elizabeth (1856, 2 Vols.)
- Life in Spain (1859)
- Turkish life and character (1860)
- British Artists from Hogarth to Turner (1861, 2 Vols.)
- Life of J. M. W. Turner (1861) Full text from the Internet Archive Digital Library.
- Haunted London (1865) Full text from the Internet Archive Digital Library.
- Tour round England (1870, 2 Vols.)
- Criss cross journeys (1873, 2 Vols.)
- Old and New London: a Narrative of its History, its People, and its Places (1873–74, 2 Vols.) Continued in an undated edition of 1878 in 6 volumes, the last four being by Edward Walford. Full text available from the Internet Archive Digital Library
