= Senator Bowie =

Senator Bowie may refer to:

- Oden Bowie (1826–1894), Maryland State Senate
- Richard Bowie (1807–1881), Maryland State Senate
- Sean Bowie (fl. 2010s), Arizona State Senate
- Walter Bowie (1748–1810), Maryland State Senate
- William Duckett Bowie (1803–1873), Maryland State Senate
