= Queen Mab (disambiguation) =

Queen Mab is a fairy in Shakespeare's Romeo and Juliet, and later in other poetry, literature, drama and cinema.

Queen Mab may also refer to:

- Queen Mab (horse), imported to the New World in 1747
- Queen Mab (poem), by Percy Bysshe Shelley, 1813
- "Queen Mab", a song by Donovan on the 1971 album HMS Donovan
- "Queen Mab", a song by Murder by Death from the 2012 album Bitter Drink, Bitter Moon
- Queen Mab Scherzo, part of Roméo et Juliette by Berlioz
- An antagonist in the Merlin canon
