= Fox Hill =

Fox Hill may refer to:

== Bahamas ==
- Fox Hill Prison
- Fox Hill, Bahamas, a village in New Providence
- Fox Hill (Bahamas Parliament constituency)

== United Kingdom ==
- Fox Hill, South Yorkshire, a district of Southey ward

== United States ==
- Fox Hill, Virginia, a neighborhood of Hampton
- Fox Hill Plantation, a historic house in Lancaster County, Virginia

== See also ==
- Foxhill (disambiguation)
- Fox Hills (disambiguation)
- The Tower on Fox Hill, in Rockville, Connecticut
