= William Bowie (sculptor) =

William Bowie (1926–1994) was a sculpture artist based in New York City from 1954 to 1994. He is best known for his works using welded gold leaf steel nails. As a contemporary of Harry Bertoia, Curtis Jere, and William and Bruce Friedle, Bowie can be considered a founding figure in the mid-century American metal sculpture genre. His effort to find artistic beauty and meaning in powerful arrangements of industrial materials associates him with the mid-century Brutalism movement.

Born in Youngstown, Ohio, Bowie attended Bethany College and Youngstown University. He moved to New York City in 1954 and opened his first studio in 1958 at 342 East 56th Street. Initially, he worked with mosaics and stained glass, and his early mosaics were made of leather and dyed cellulose sponges. In 1958, he switched to metal work. In 1962, he opened a second studio, called “The Sculpture Studio,” at 202 East 77th Street.

Bowie won multiple awards including the 1965 Purchase Prize from the Sculpture Exhibit of the Butler Institute of American Art at Purdue University and the Symposium ’66 Good Design Award of Outstanding Merit in Craftsmanship from Artist-Craftsman of New York. Bowie exhibited a 12-foot sculpture at the 1964 New York World’s Fair. Bowie received numerous commissions from collectors and institutions, including the Society for Savings, New York Bank for Savings, the Americana Hotel in Miami, the Playboy Club in New Orleans, LA., Temple Beth El in St. Petersburg, FL, Hotel San Juan in Puerto Rico and The Center Club in Baltimore.

Bowie died on January 18, 1994, in New York City.
