= Betty Duvall =

Confederate spy (1845–1891)

Betty Duvall Webb
- Born: Elizabeth Duvall c. 1845
- Died: July 3, 1891 (aged 45–46)
- Burial place: Oak Hill Cemetery; Washington, D.C., U.S.
- Spouse: John Converse Webb
- Children: 3
- Military career
- Allegiance: Confederate States of America

Elizabeth Duvall Webb (c. 1845 – July 3, 1891) was a Confederate spy during the American Civil War.

== Biography ==
Elizabeth Duvall was from Washington, D.C. She was the daughter of Eli Duvall Sr. and Sarah (née Thompson) Duvall. She was descended from the immigrant Mareen Duvall.

Washington D.C.–based spy Rose O'Neal Greenhow gave her a note about a Union plan for the first Battle of Manassas (or Bull Run) to give to General P. G. T. Beauregard; Duvall carried it tucked in her hair. She continued to be a spy, and for one of her missions she brought her cousin.

She married John Converse Webb. They had three children.

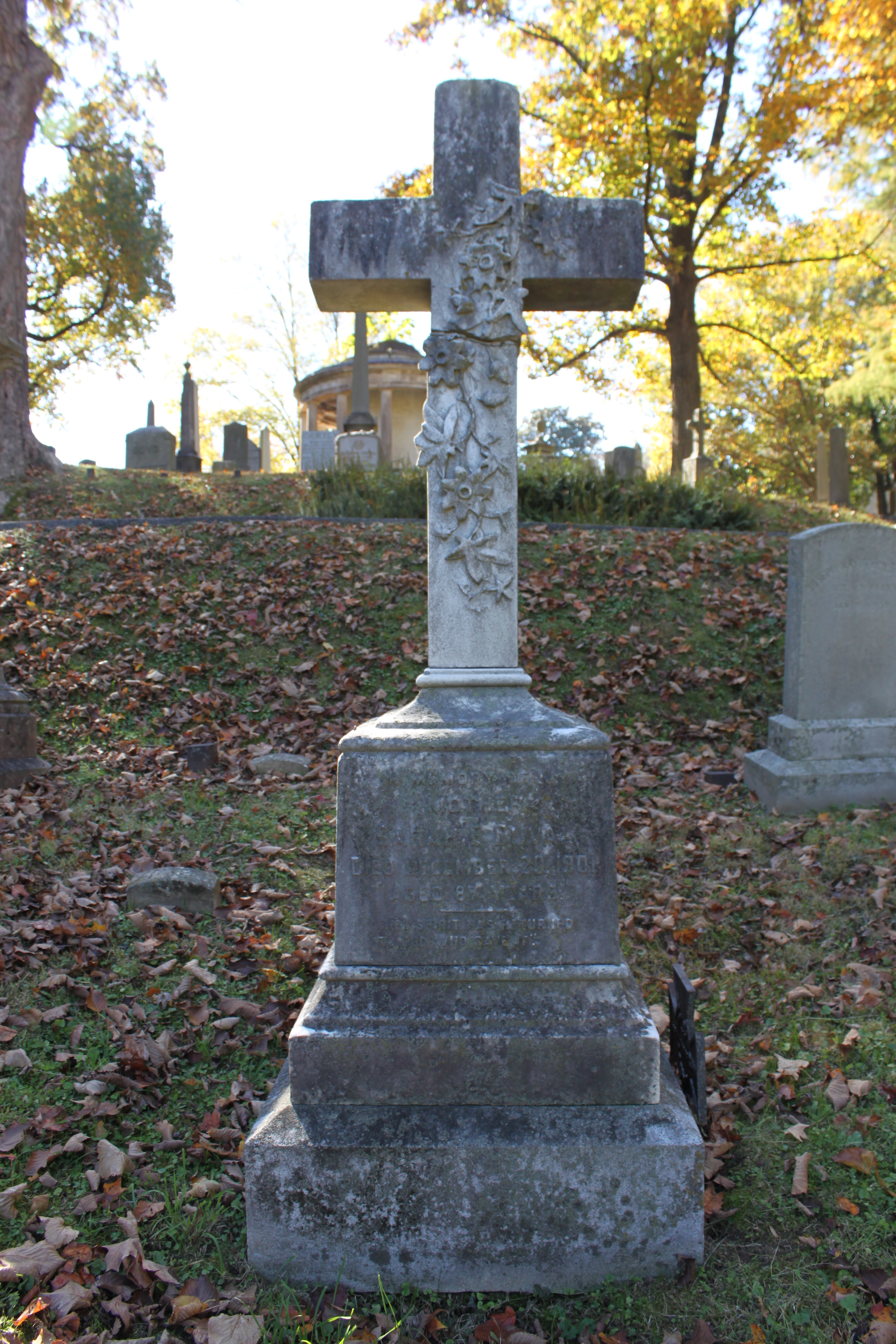
Grave of Duvall at Oak Hill Cemetery

She died on July 3, 1891. She was buried at Oak Hill Cemetery in Washington, D.C.
