= Allen Pond Park =

Park in Maryland, United States

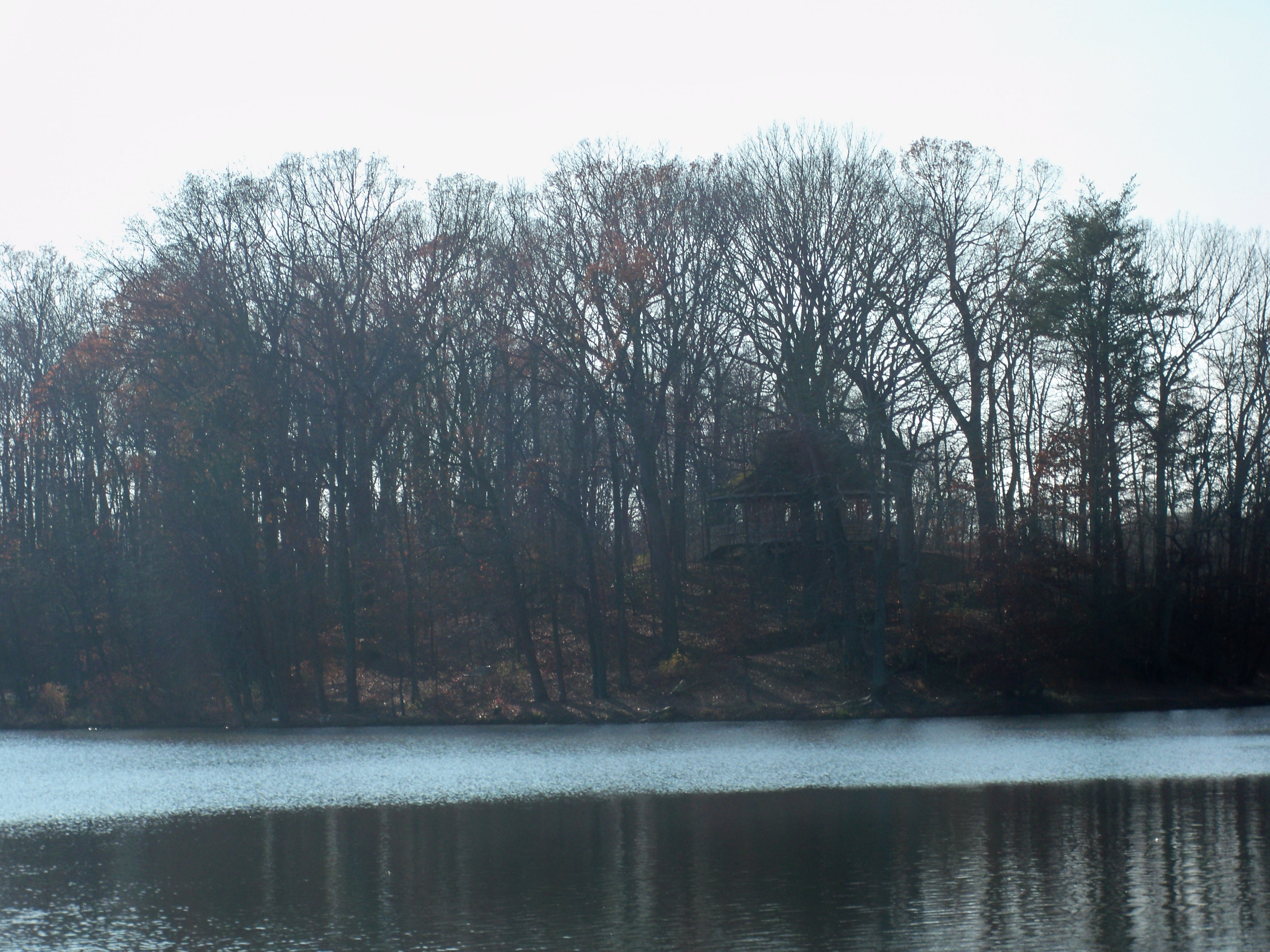
- The Allen Pond Gazebo
- Interactive map of Allen Pond Park
- Type: Urban park
- Location: Bowie, Maryland
- Coordinates: 38°56′5.5″N 76°44′24″W
- Area: 85 acres (34 ha)
- Founder: James Allen
- Manager: City of Bowie, Maryland
- Operator: City of Bowie Recreation and Parks
- Open: All year

Allen Pond Park is an 85-acre (340,000 m^{2}) multi-use park, located in and managed by the City of Bowie in Prince George's County, Maryland. The park includes an ice arena, amphitheater, boat rentals, skate park, 10-acre (40,000 m^{2}) stocked pond, six lighted ballfields, picnic areas and pavilions, walking and biking trails, a lighted basketball court, fitness station and several playground areas. It is also the home of Opportunity Park, which offers 100% accessible experiences at its tot lot, school-aged playground, fitness cluster and fishing. The park has a 39% total wood coverage, with the pond occupying 12% of the park. The parking lot that services the park can be accessed from 3404 Mitchellville Road, across from the Mitchellville Road Soccer Fields, and from the main 3330 Northview Drive entrance.

== Allen Pond ==
Allen Pond
- Location within Maryland
- Location: Prince George's County
- Coordinates: 38.9334803°N 76.7398567°W
- Type: Reservoir
- Primary outflows: Collington Branch
- Surface area: 10 acres (40,000 m^{2})
- Surface elevation: 112 feet (34 m)

Allen Pond is a ten-acre man-made lake and the centerpiece of this eponymous park. It drains into Collington Branch.

Bass and crappie are frequently taken from the pond. In 1993, several reports of piranhas being caught in Allen Pond surfaced, with one reported in excess of 11 inches long.

== History ==
The pond and surrounding area was owned by a farmer, James Allen. He and his family raised cattle and tobacco on the property. Allen established the pond as a fishing attraction and sold access as annual shares for ten dollars. The land including the pond was sold to Levitt & Sons, the developer of Belair at Bowie, in 1965 with Allen making a request that the pond and surrounding area become a park for the community.

The Robert V. Setera Amphitheater was built on the grounds in the late 1960s.

== See also ==
- Foxhill Park
