= Collington Branch =

River in Maryland, United States

Coordinates: 38°57′38″N 76°45′14″W

Collington Branch is a stream that flows into the Western Branch of the Patuxent River in Prince George's County, Maryland.

== Inflows ==
Woodward Pond, sometimes referred to Foxhill Lake drains into Collington Branch.

Allen Pond is a ten-acre man-made lake that drains into Collington Branch.

== Environmental concerns ==
The major pollutant in this stream is non-point sediment from the communities of Highbrige Park, Gallant Fox, Stewart's Landing, Westview, Long Ridge, Tulip Grove, Foxhill, Kenilworth, Old Stage, Princeton Square, Northview, Enfield Chase, Woodmore Highlands in Bowie, Maryland. The source of the sediment is erosion from construction, storm water runoff carrying lawn chemicals such as excess fertilizer, and pet waste runoff from lawns.

== Historical significance ==
In 1696, the Council of Maryland divided Prince George's County into six districts referred to as "Hundreds": Mattapany, Patuxent, Collington, Mount Calvert, Piscattoway and New Scotland. Collington Branch formed the boundary between Collington Hundred and Patuxent Hundred.

== Parks ==
Foxhill Park contains a tributary of Collington Branch.

Collington Branch Park located at 15532 Peach Walker Dr in Bowie, Maryland takes its name from the stream but does not directly abut it.

The Collington Branch is planned for a multi-use trail that will connect Bowie with Upper Marlboro, Maryland. In 2000, the Prince George's County Bicycle and Trails Advisory Group recommended this trail as the number seven trail/bikeway priority in the county.

== See also ==
- Collington, Maryland
- Foxhill Park
