= Leeland, Maryland =

Coordinates: 38°52′26″N 76°44′55″W

Leeland was a settlement in Prince George's County, Maryland, United States. It was once a stop on the Baltimore and Potomac Railroad.

== See also ==
- St. Barnabas' Episcopal Church, Leeland
- Bowieville
