= Spark (horse) =

British-bred Thoroughbred racehorse

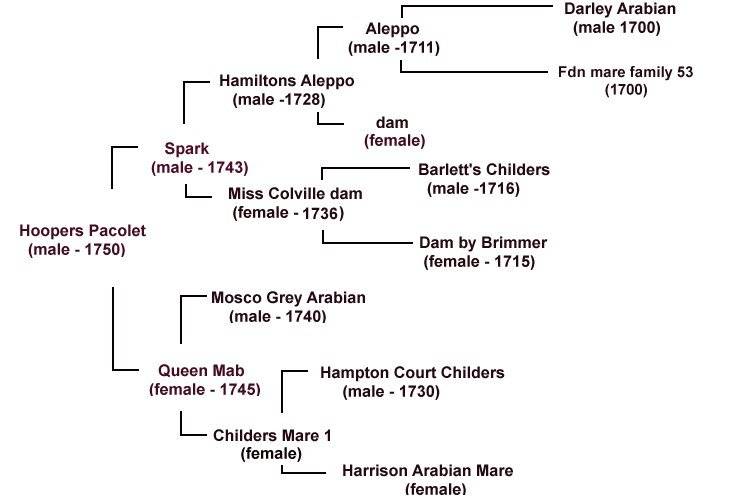
- A version of Spark's pedigree
- Breed: Arabian
- Sire: disputed
- Dam: Miss Colville
- Sex: Male (stallion)
- Foaled: 1743
- Country: foaled in England, imported to U.S.
- Owner: Frederick Louis, Samuel Ogle

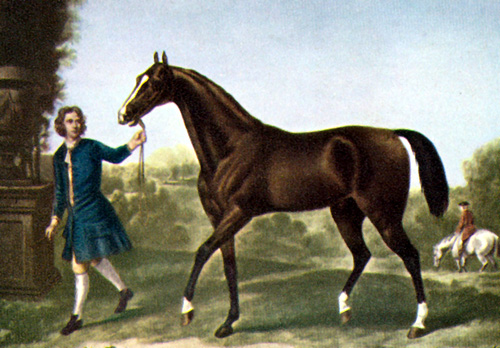
Darley Arabian, ancestor of Spark

Spark was a Thoroughbred stallion who was among the early imports of Thoroughbred horses to America. The Belair Stud stables were associated with him and a mare, Queen Mab, also imported in this period. Frederick, Prince of Wales gave the stallion to Samuel Ogle, the governor of Maryland, as a gift.

== Background ==
Spark was foaled in 1743. He was bred by and originally the property of Charles Fleetwood, Esquire. Fleetwood gave Spark to Frederick Louis, the Prince of Wales. (Note: "Ogle was an active horseman and supporter of thoroughbred racing in the colonies. He imported “Queen Mab,” the famous English brood mare, and “Spark,” a blooded stallion originally owned by Frederick, Prince of Wales, and given to Ogle by Lord Baltimore.") The Prince of Wales, gave the stallion to Lord Baltimore to give to Samuel Ogle, Provincial Governor of Maryland as a present. (Note: "The first thoroughbred racing-horse of America was imported into Maryland – "Spark", the gift of Lord Baltimore to Gov. Ogle from the Prince of Wales, about 1732.") Spark was already known in the British Isles. An 1898 account described Spark as the "first pedigree horse" imported to Maryland.

One account states that Ogle took Spark back to the American Colonies from England in the Spring of 1747. Another says that Lord Baltimore gave the horse to Ogle "about" 1750. This was Ogle's last tour of duty to replace Thomas Bladen, the past governor of the British colony of Maryland. The pedigree of Spark is unclear and somewhat disputed. Historian Fairfax Harrison concluded that Spark was the product of the mare Miss Colville and stallion Aleppo. Henry William Herbert records that Weatherby's Stud Book (General Stud Book) has Spark by Honeycomb Punch out of Wilke's old Hautboy mare, which is believed to be another name for Miss Colville. The pedigree record bears the seal of Lord Baltimore. It shows that Aleppo came from the Darley Arabian bloodline. They also show that Queen Mab came from thoroughbred stock through Musgrover's grey Arabian. Benjamin Tasker, Jr. claims he had handwritten records on May 20, 1758, from breeders associated with Spark concerning his pedigree. The American descendant records of Spark shows he sired a line of horses claimed to be very fast. By 1787, descent from Spark and Queen Mab was used in advertising to promote breeding stallions.

== Belair ==
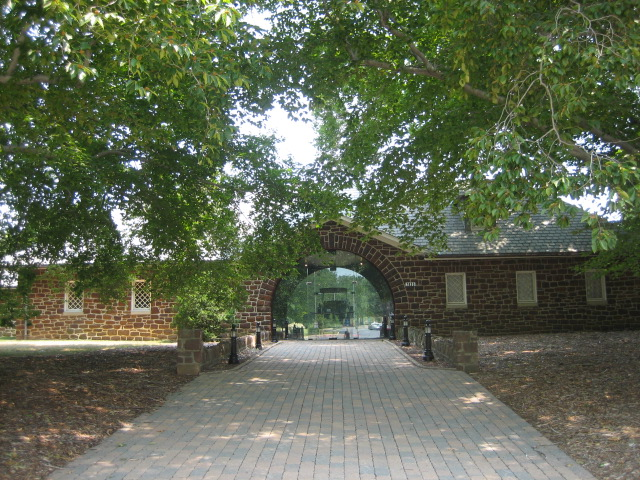
Belair Stables

The importation of Spark and Queen Mab was the start of the development of the American purebred racehorse field. These two horses established the Belair Stud legacy for the bloodlines of the future. The Belair Manor property was a horse breeding farm and stables for Thoroughbred race horses. This area of Maryland became known as the American Cradle of Thoroughbred Racing. Benjamin Tasker, Jr. was the original owner of this prominent well-known property and mansion. He gave it to his sister Anne as a wedding gift when she married Ogle in 1739.

The Manor property originally consisted of a Georgian colonial style red brick mansion and 3,600 acres of land. Governor Ogle built here the first Belair stables and a racetrack for Spark from a 600-acre part of the property. Ogle had next his townhouse in Annapolis at King George Street and Tabernacle Street another racetrack. This way he could watch Spark from his drawing room when he was there for races. Maryland governors Charles Carnan Ridgely, Robert Wright, Edward Lloyd, Samuel Sprigg and Oden Bowie kept the tradition, started by Spark of thoroughbred racing, going by breeding their own race horses.

== Sources ==
- Baltz, Shirley Vlasak (1984). A Chronicle of Belair. Bowie Heritage Committee.
- Battell, Joseph (1909). American Stallion Register. American Publishing Company. "The above pedigrees of old Spark and Queen Mab I have now by me from under the hands of their breeders."
- Bookplate, American (1897). Ex Libris. American Bookplate Society.
- Culver, Francis Barnum (1922). Blooded Horses of Colonial Days. (p.92). "Bred by the Prince of Wales and imported from England in 1747 by Governor Samuel Ogle of Maryland. Spark is recorded as a son of Honeycomb Punch out of Wilkes' old Hautboy mare Miss Colville. His pedigree bears the seal of Lord Baltimore."
- Edgar, Lady Matilda Ridout (1912). Colonial Governor in Maryland. Longmans, Green, and Company. p. 295.
- Gatto, Kimberly (2012). Belair Stud. The History Press. ISBN 978-1-60949-481-0.
- Harrison, Fairfax (1929). The Belair Stud, 1747–1761. Priv. print., Old Dominion Press. "The Spark who was a son of Honeycomb Punch has an authenticated record in the stud in Yorkshire in the seventeen twenties (See Cuthbert Routh's Stud Book in Prior's Early Records, pp. 55, 38)"
- Herbert, Henry William (1871). Frank Forester's Horsemanship. G.E. Woodward. p. 126. "It seems also that there is some dispute as to his pedigree.* Weatherby's stud-book has Spark, by Honeycomb Punch out of Wilkes' Old Hautboy mare, and this I presume is the horse in question, as is stated by Patrick Nisbett Edgar, in his Sportsman's Herald, who gives his pedigree as above, signed and sealed by Lord Baltimore. Skinner, in his stud-book, states him to have been got by Aleppo, son of the Darley Arabian, dam by Bartlett's ChilJers, &c.; but he states no authority, and I presume is in error; as I find no grounds for such a pedigree. Edgar states, also, that Wilkes' * Old Hautboy mare, dam by Brimmer, was also imported into Virginia by Col. Colville, and afterward known as Miss Colville. Old Hautboy was son of the D'Arcy white Turk, out of one of King Charles II.'s barb mares. Honeycomb sire of Punch, by the Dun Barb out of a Babraham mare. Governor Ogle, the owner of Spark, who as a grandson of Hautboy must dato back to early in the 18th century, also imported Queen Mab, by Musgrove's grey Arabian; but the date of her importation is not known more certainly than that of Spark. Frederic, Prince of Wales, however, who gave him to Lord Baltimore, died himself in 1751, by which one may conjecture his importation to have occurred previously to that date. The circumstances of the gift speak well for the character of the horse, who was probably in a high form as a racer, since royal donors are not wont to make worthless donations."
- McWilliams, Jane W. (3 May 2011). Annapolis, City on the Severn. JHU Press. ISBN 978-0-8018-9659-0.
- Perrin, William Henry (1882). History of Fayette County, Ky. Southern Historical Press. "Racing was carried on in Maryland many years previous to Braddock's defeat in 1753, and Gov. Ogle was presented with the celebrated imported stallion Spark, by Lord Baltimore. who received him as a present from his Royal Highness, Frederick, Prince of Wales, father to King George III."
- Sidney, Samuel (1893). The Book of the Horse. Cassell & Company. p. 90. "Thoroughbred horses were imported by the colonists of Maryland and Virginia as early as the reign of George II.; the first pedigree horse, Spark, having, according to tradition, been presented to Governor Ogle, about 1750, by Lord Baltimore, who had received him as a present from the Prince of Wales."
- Skinner, J.S. American turf register and sporting magazine. Рипол Классик. ISBN 978-5-88102-987-6.
- Tayloe, Benjamin Ogle (1872). In Memoriam: Benjamin Ogle Tayloe. Sherman & Company, printers. p. 357.
- Thoroughbred_Record (1922). Thoroughbred Record. Record Publishing Company. "The Prince of Wales, father of George III and brother to the Duke of Cumberland, breeder of the great Eclipse, had presented to Lord Baltimore a running horse called Spark, which the noble lord passed along to Samuel Ogle, Governor of the Maryland."
- Walsh, John Henry (1888). Horse, in Stable and Field. G. Routledge and Sons. p. 36.
- White, J. T. (1897). National Cyclopedia American Biography, V.1-. J. T. White. "Lord Baltimore presented him with a fine horse called "Sparks." which he had received from Frederick, father of George III., and which became the sire of many fast horses in Maryland before the revolution."
