= Fox Hills =

Fox Hills may refer to:

- Fox Hills, Culver City, California
- Fox Hills, Staten Island, New York
- Fox Hills Formation, a Cretaceous geologic formation in the northwestern Great Plains of North America
- Fox Hills Mall, former name of Westfield Culver City, California
- Jabal Thuaileb (Fox Hills), a district in Al Daayen, Qatar

== See also ==
- Foxhills School, Scunthorpe, North Lincolnshire, England
- Fox Hill (disambiguation)
- Foxhill (disambiguation)
