= Fairwood, Maryland =

- CDP
- Interactive map of Fairwood, Maryland
- Coordinates: 38°57′22″N 76°46′25″W
- Country: United States
- State: Maryland
- County: Prince George's

Area
  - Total: 3.42 sq mi (8.85 km^{2})
  - Land: 3.41 sq mi (8.84 km^{2})
  - Water: 0.0039 sq mi (0.01 km^{2})
- Elevation: 36 ft (11 m)

Population (2020)
  - Total: 7,983
  - Density: 2,338.3/sq mi (902.82/km^{2})
- Time zone: UTC−5 (Eastern (EST))
  - Summer (DST): UTC−4 (EDT)
- FIPS code: 24-27580

Fairwood is an unincorporated area and census-designated place (CDP) in Prince George's County, Maryland, United States. The population was 7,983 at the 2020 census.

== Geography ==
Fairwood is located at 38°57′22″N 76°46′25″W (38.9562, −76.7735). According to the United States Census Bureau, the CDP has a total area of 3.7 square miles (9.6 km^{2}) of land.

== Demographics ==
Historical population
Census	Pop.	Note	%±
2010	5,031		—
2020	7,983		58.7%
U.S. Decennial Census; 2010 2020

Fairwood first appeared as a census designated place in the 2010 U.S. census formed from part of Woodmore CDP.

=== Racial and ethnic composition ===
Fairwood CDP, Maryland – Racial and ethnic composition Note: the US Census treats Hispanic/Latino as an ethnic category. This table excludes Latinos from the racial categories and assigns them to a separate category. Hispanics/Latinos may be of any race.
Race / Ethnicity (NH = Non-Hispanic)	Pop 2010	Pop 2020	% 2010	% 2020
White alone (NH)	505	562	10.04%	7.04%
Black or African American alone (NH)	3,763	6,077	74.80%	76.12%
Native American or Alaska Native alone (NH)	19	7	0.38%	0.09%
Asian alone (NH)	373	611	7.41%	7.65%
Native Hawaiian or Pacific Islander alone (NH)	0	3	0.00%	0.04%
Other race alone (NH)	7	32	0.14%	0.40%
Mixed race or Multiracial (NH)	157	349	3.12%	4.37%
Hispanic or Latino (any race)	207	342	4.11%	4.28%
Total	5,031	7,983	100.00%	100.00%

=== 2020 census ===
As of the 2020 census, Fairwood had a population of 7,983. The median age was 39.9 years. 26.7% of residents were under the age of 18 and 10.6% of residents were 65 years of age or older. For every 100 females there were 87.4 males, and for every 100 females age 18 and over there were 84.1 males age 18 and over.

100.0% of residents lived in urban areas, while 0.0% lived in rural areas.

There were 2,433 households in Fairwood, of which 45.9% had children under the age of 18 living in them. Of all households, 62.4% were married-couple households, 9.7% were households with a male householder and no spouse or partner present, and 24.6% were households with a female householder and no spouse or partner present. About 16.7% of all households were made up of individuals and 4.5% had someone living alone who was 65 years of age or older.

There were 2,472 housing units, of which 1.6% were vacant. The homeowner vacancy rate was 0.6% and the rental vacancy rate was 4.2%.

== Education ==
Fairwood is in the Prince George's County Public School System.

- Elementary school: Woodmore, Glenn Dale, Whitehall, and High Bridge
- Middle school: Thomas Johnson, Samuel Ogle, and Benjamin Tasker
- High school: DuVal High School and Bowie High School
