= C. Jeré =

American sculptor

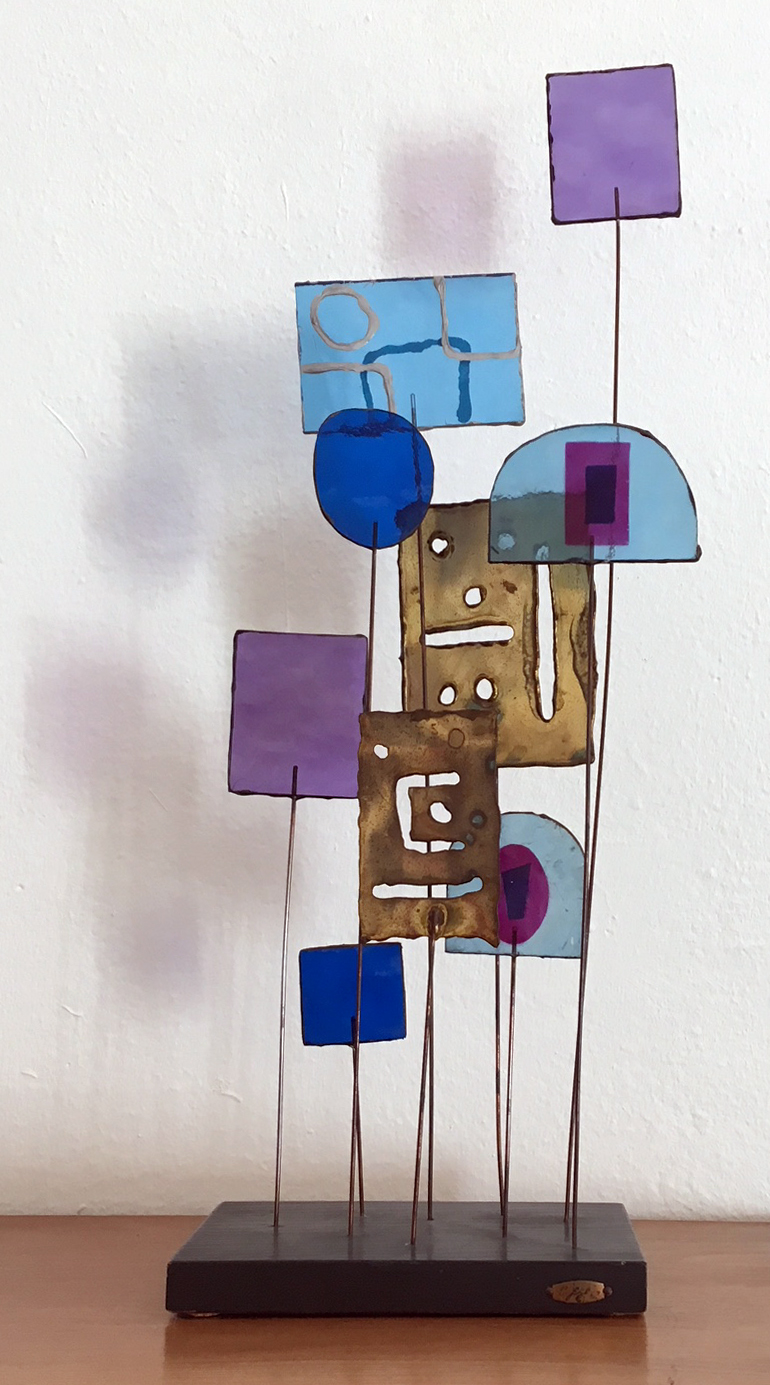
Sculpture by Curtis Jeré, signed "C. Jeré", 1967.

C. Jeré (or Curtis Jeré, often seen without the accent) is a metalwork company known for wall sculptures and household accessories. C. Jeré works range from representational to highly abstract, and are made and marketed by the corporation Artisan House.

Curtis Jeré is a compound nom de plume of founding artists Curtis Freiler and Jerry Fels, who combined parts of their own names to create the C. Jeré signature.

According to Modernism magazine, which interviewed Jerry Fels shortly before his death in October 2008, the company was founded in 1963 by Fels and his brother-in-law Curtis (Kurt) Freiler. Freiler was the production chief and Fels was head of design. Their goal was to produce "gallery-quality art for the masses." Prior to the establishment of Artisan House, the partners built a costume jewelry business, selling work under the names Renoir and Matisse, which employed around 300 people at one point. Kurt and Jerry sold Artisan House in 1972. Kurt Freiler died July 22, 2013, at the age of 103.

In a two-page article on the history of C. Jeré for the November 2010 issue of Elle Decor, Mitchell Owens wrote that, after launching in 1964, C. Jeré sculptures were "distributed by Raymor, a cutting edge studio in New York City, and retailed at Gump's in San Francisco and other high quality emporiums…Under Freiler's meticulous direction, the workers—a number of whom were minorities or handicapped—sheared, crimped, torched, and welded brass, copper, and other metals before coating them with luminous patinas…Today those pieces are attracting the admiration of leading dealers in vintage chic."

Sold and resold, the company still produces metal sculptures including reintroductions of popular mid-century modern designs. Artisan House sculptures are no longer made in California. Production went overseas to China in 2003. Some of the older techniques, such as enameling, using resin, and the bronzes, haven't been used in decades.
