= Mareen Duvall =

American settler (1625–1694)

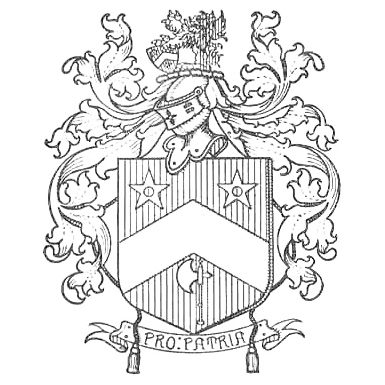
- Coat of arms of Mareen Duvall
- Born: Marin Duval; 1625; Nantes, Province of Brittany, Kingdom of France
- Died: 1694 (aged 69); Province of Maryland, English Empire
- Spouses: Susanna Marie Brashears; Marie Bouth; Mary
- Children: Mareen "Maruis" the Elder; John; Eleanor; Samuel; Susannah; Lewis; Mareen the Younger; Catherine; Mary; Elizabeth Roberts; Johanna Poole; Benjamin

Mareen Duvall (1625–1694) was a French Huguenot and an early American settler.

== Background ==
Mareen Duvall was born in 1625, in Nantes, France, and was originally named Marin Duval. On August 28, 1650, Duvall emigrated as an indentured servant (contracted to work for seven years) to the English colony of Maryland.

Eventually, he acquired a patent for La Val from the Calvert family who were the first proprietors of colonial Maryland. It was possible that he named the family estate after the county of Laval, an independent county created in the 15th century. This property was on the south side the South River in Anne Arundel County, Maryland. He became quite prosperous and his Middle Plantation in Davidsonville, Maryland, and La Val were "as luxurious and courtly as any of the manors of the English gentry."

He died in 1694 and left his substantial estate (which included at least 18 slaves) to Mary Stanton, his third and final wife, who administered the estate. Duvall had purchased sizeable tracts of land, including Catton which was later known as Belair, as well as the Middle Plantation in Davidsonville, Maryland. Combined, he owned several thousand acres in the counties of Anne Arundel and Prince George’s. Scholars believed that the location of the original house of Middle Plantation was somewhere along the Rutland Road.

In 1705, his son, John Duvall and his wife Mary deeded land to Queen Anne Parish to construct St. Barnabas Church. Mareen Duvall's widow, Mary went on to marry Henry Ridgley (1635–1710). After Ridgley's death, she married Jacob Henderson.

== Genealogy ==
Genealogies often refer to him as "the Emigrant" to distinguish him from several descendants also named Mareen Duvall. His notable descendants include Harry S. Truman, Barack Obama, Dick Cheney, Wallis Simpson, and Robert Duvall.

Other descendants include Warren Buffett, former Associate Justice Gabriel Duvall, Confederate General Bradley Tyler Johnson and spy Betty Duvall.

== See also ==
- Colonial families of Maryland
