= William Bowie (agrarian) =

American agrarian (1776-1826)

William Bowie (January 29, 1776 – 1826) was an agrarian and delegate to the state convention to charter the Chesapeake & Ohio Canal.

Born at Locust Grove in Prince George's County, Maryland on January 29, 1776 to Walter Bowie and Mary (Brooks) Bowie, William Bowie was the only member of his family who did not engage in politics. He was appointed Justice of the Peace from 1808 to 1810 and became a member of the Levy Court in 1820.

In 1825, Bowie was selected by Joseph Kent, governor of Maryland at that time, to be a delegate to the state convention to charter the Chesapeake & Ohio Canal.

He married Kitty Beans Duckett and had several children including William Duckett Bowie and Walter Baruch Bowie.
