= Barton Bouchier =

English religious writer (1794–1864)

Barton Bouchier (1794–1864) was an English religious writer.

== Biography ==
He was born in 1794, was a younger son of the vicar of Epsom, Surrey, the Rev. Jonathan Boucher and Elizabeth James (née Hodgson). Barton changed his name from Boucher to Bouchier after 1822. He was educated at Balliol College, Oxford. In 1816 he married Mary, daughter of the Rev. Nathaniel Thornbury, of Avening, Gloucestershire. He proceeded B.A. in 1822, and M.A. in 1827. Bouchier at first read for the bar. But he afterwards took holy orders and became curate at Monmouth. A sermon preached by him at Usk in 1822 for the Christian Knowledge Society was published by request. Bouchier held curacies later at Old, Northamptonshire (Gent. Mag. supra), and (before 1834) at Cheam, Surrey, from which place he issued an edition of Bishop Andrewes's 'Prayers.' In 1836 he published 'Prophecy and Fulfilment,' a little book of corresponding texts; and in 1845 'Thomas Bradley,' a story of a poor parishioner, and the first of a series of similar pamphlets describing clerical experiences, collected and published in various editions as 'My Parish,' and 'The Country Pastor,' from 1855 to 1860.

In 1852 Bouchier commenced the publication of his 'Manna in the House,' being expositions of the gospels and the Acts, lasting, with intervals, down to 1858; in 1854 he wrote his 'The Ark in the House,' being family prayers for a month; and in 1855 he wrote his 'Manna in the Heart,' being comments on the Psalms. In 1853 he wrote a 'Letter' to the prime minister (Lord Aberdeen) against opening the Crystal Palace on Sundays, following up this appeal in 1854 by 'The Poor Man's Palace,' &c., a pamphlet addressed to the Crystal Palace directors. In 1856 he published 'Solace in Sickness,' a collection of hymns, and in the same year was made rector of Fonthill Bishop, Wiltshire. He published his 'Farewell Sermon' to his Cheam flock, having preached it on 28 September. In 1864 he published 'The History of Isaac.' He died at the rectory 20 December 1864, aged 70. The editorship of 'The Vision,' a humorous illustrated poem on Jonathan Boucher's philological studies, written by Sir F. M. Eden, bart., and published in 1820, has been wrongly attributed to Bouchier.
