= William Duckett Bowie =

American politician (1802-1873)

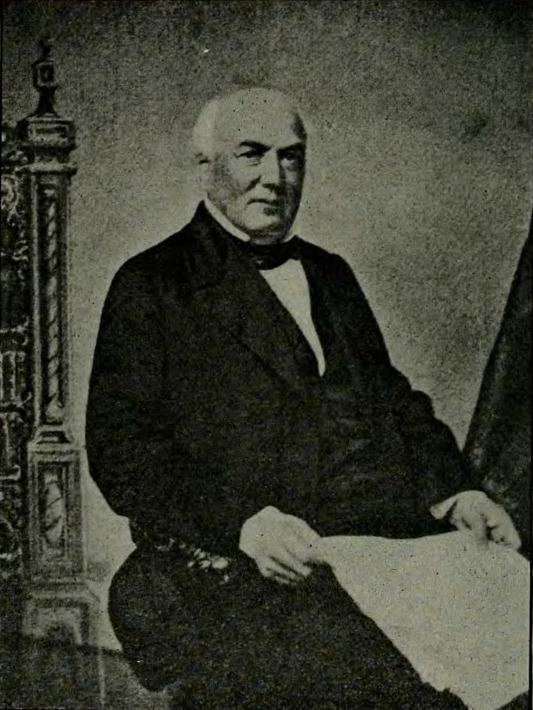
- Born: 7 October 1803
- Died: 18 July 1873 (aged 69)
- Occupation: Politician
- Spouse(s): Eliza Mary Oden
- Children: Oden Bowie
- Parent(s): William Bowie; Kitty Beans Duckett

William Duckett Bowie (7 October 1803 – 18 July 1873), was an American politician. The eldest child of William Bowie and Kitty Beanes Duckett, he was born at Fairview Plantation in Prince George's County, Maryland.

== Career and Wealth ==
His maternal grandfather, Baruch Duckett left him Quarter Plantation near Collington, Maryland where he settled after leaving college as well as a sizeable number of slaves After the death of his two brothers, Governor Robert Bowie in 1818 and Walter Baruch Bowie in 1832, and by purchasing the interests of his sisters, he became the owner of Fairview where he then made his home.

Upon the death of his father in 1810, William Duckett Bowie was made the executor of his will which increased his wealth significantly and his uncle, Daniel Bowie bequeathed to him all of his land upon his death as well which combined, made him one of the wealthiest planters in Prince George's County.

In 1830, he and his uncle Walter Bowie Jr. were appointed by the Governor Thomas King Carroll as members of the Levy Court for Prince George's County. In 1838 and 1839 he was nominated by the Democrats for the state Legislature but defeated by his cousin Thomas Fielder Bowie the Whig candidate. in 1840, he overcame the large Whig vote and was elected to the Maryland House of Delegates in which he served two terms. After that, he beat the Whig leader Robert Bowie of Mattaponi, Maryland for the Maryland Senate seat. He was re-elected at the end of his first term.

== Family ==
On 8 February 1825, William Duckett Bowie married Eliza Mary Oden, daughter of Benjamin Oden Sr. and Rachael Sophia West. They had five children, Oden Bowie, born 10 December 1826, Catherine Bowie in 1828, William Duckett Bowie Jr. in November 1830, Christiana Sophia Bowie in 1835 and Walter Baruch Bowie on 26 August 1836. Eliza died in 1849.

On 7 January 1854, William Duckett Bowie married his first wife's half-sister, Mary Black West. They had three girls, Harriet Oden Bowie, Mary Eliza Bowie and Laura Bowie.

After his second marriage Bowie gave Fairview to his eldest son, Oden Bowie and moved to Bellefields near Croom, Maryland which was the old Colonial home of his second wife. Bellefield had originally been the property of Patrick Sim, ancestor of Governor Thomas Sim Lee. Bowie died at Bellefield 18 July 1873 and is interred at Fairview.
