= James T. Woodward =

American banker (1837-1910)

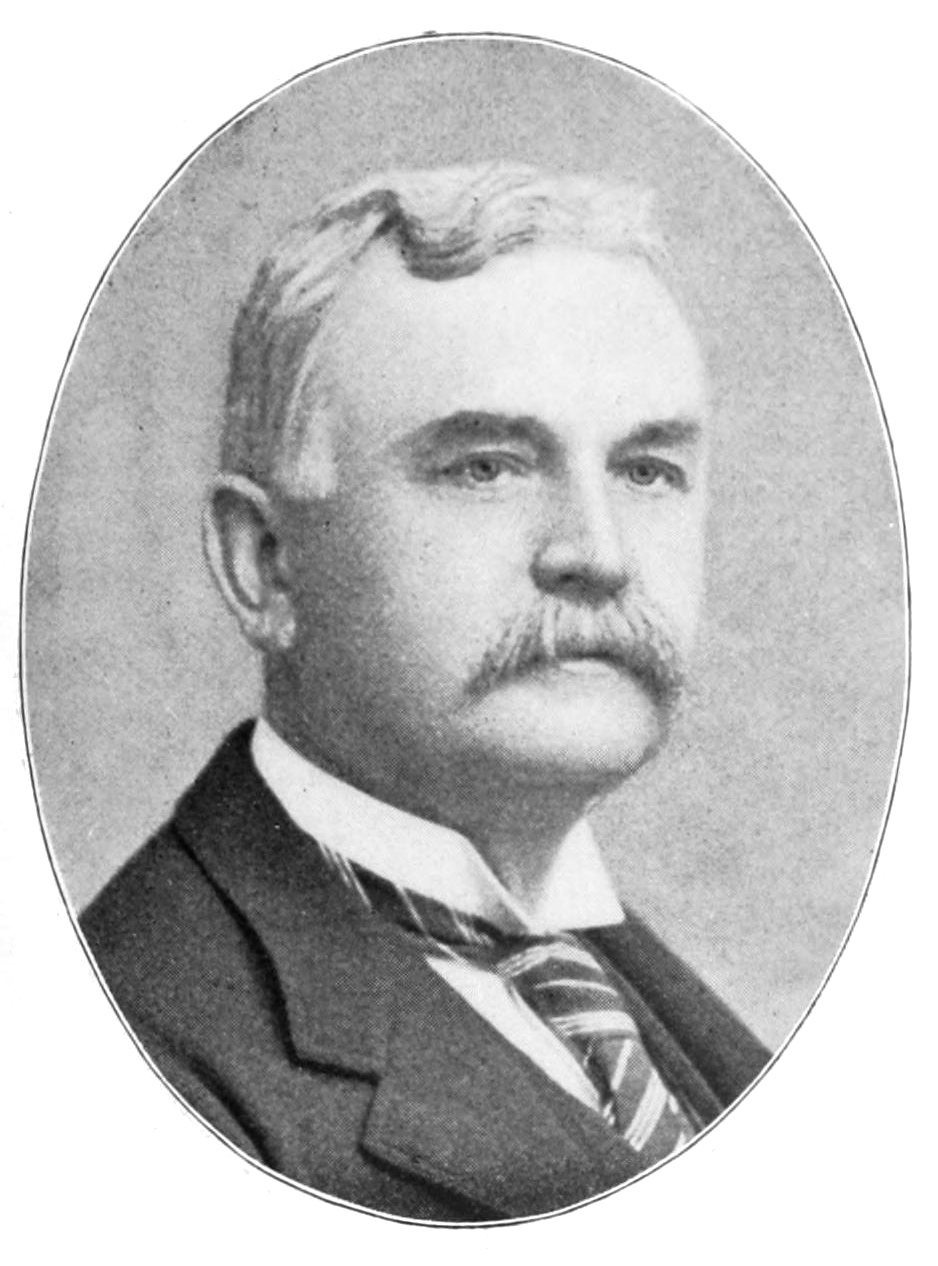

President of Hanover National Bank
- In office 1877–1910
- Succeeded by: William Woodward Sr.

Personal details
- Born: James Thomas Woodward; September 27, 1837 Anne Arundel County, Maryland, US
- Died: April 10, 1910 (aged 72) New York City, US
- Resting place: Woodlawn, Cemetery, Bronx, New York
- Parent(s): Henry Williams Woodward; Mary Edge Webb
- Occupation: Banker
- Known for: Owner of Belair Mansion and Belair Stud

James Thomas Woodward (September 27, 1837 – April 10, 1910) was an American banker and owner of a major thoroughbred horse dynasty.

== Early life ==
Woodward was born on September 27, 1837, at Edgewood Plantation in Gambrills Station in Anne Arundel County, Maryland. the second child born to Henry Williams Woodward (1803–1841) and Mary Edge (née Webb) Woodward, who were both from colonial families. His older brother was William Woodward (father of William Woodward Sr.) and his paternal grandparents were Henry William Woodward and Eleanor Duckett (née Williams) Woodward.

His family, who were already well established textile merchants, gathered tremendous wealth during the American Civil War by selling textiles to both the Unionist government and Confederate government,. As a boy, James spent the war years learning in a country school near his home. Afterwards, he went to Baltimore to complete his education.

== Career ==
After the War ended, Woodward moved to New York and took a job at the importing house of Ross, Campbell & Co. where his business acumen was recognized.

In the early 1870s, he became a director in the Hanover National Bank. In 1877, his brother William Woodward (who founded the New York Cotton Exchange) and he pooled their funds and bought a large portion of the bank from J. & J. Stewart, bankers in the Hanover Bank. James was elected president of the bank the same year. Under his leadership the deposits of the bank grew from $6,000,000 to $100,000,000. In 1903, the Bank moved to its new headquarters at the southwest corner of Pine and Nassau Streets in Manhattan.

Woodward also served as chairman of the New York Clearing House (a consortium of the city's banks) during the Panic of 1907, having been chosen as president of the New York Clearing House Association on October 4, 1898, reportedly "he had not sought the post of honor, but had earned it by many years of conservative and successful banking." He also served as a director of the Union Trust Company of New York, the Birmingham Realty Company, the Birmingham Trust and Savings Company, the First National Bank of Baltimore, the Greenwich Bank, the Madison Square Garden Company, and the Mercantile Trust and Deposit Company of Baltimore.

=== Political beliefs ===
In politics, Woodward was an old-line Democrat. In 1884, he was a delegate to the Democratic National Convention in Chicago where his friend, Grover Cleveland, was nominated for President of the United States. "Only once did he refrain from voting for the Democratic Presidential candidate; that was in 1896 when free silver was the paramount issue." Woodward joined the Sound Money party and voted for the Republican candidate William McKinley, who won the election of William Jennings Bryan.

== Personal life ==
Woodward was a bachelor his entire life, but was active socially, and counted two time President Grover Cleveland among his close personal friends. He joined many elite clubs including the Union Club, the Metropolitan Club, the Knickerbocker Club of New York City and the Maryland Club of Baltimore. Woodward regularly attended services at Holy Trinity Episcopal Church. An avid hunter and horseman, Woodward purchased the historic Belair Mansion and Stud farm in 1898. In addition to Belair, he also maintained residences in New York and Rhode Island.

Woodward died of "paralysis of the brain" at 9 East 56th Street, his residence in New York City, on April 10, 1910. After his funeral at St. Thomas' Church on Fifth Avenue, he was buried at the Woodlawn Cemetery, Bronx. His nephew, William Woodward Sr. was his sole heir, inheriting the Belair estate and becoming the successor president of Hanover National Bank. The inheritance tax of $3,200 was the largest ever paid in Prince George's County at that time.

=== Legacy ===
Woodward developed a very close relationship with Saint John's College in Annapolis, Maryland, and was elected to its board of visitors. He invested significantly in both repairing Belair and expanding St. John's during this time. In June 1909, St John's gave the honorary degree of Doctor of Laws to Woodward in recognition of his extensive contribution to the school. The Barr-Buchanan Center at St. John's College was originally named Woodward Hall in his honor.
