= Jonathan Boucher =

English minister (1738–1804)

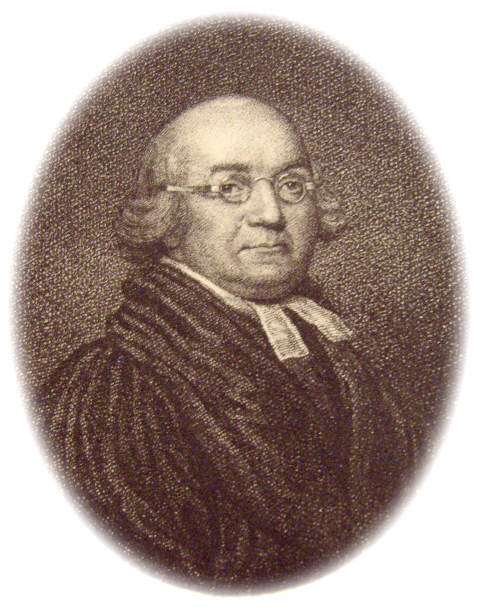
Jonathan Boucher, c. 1790

Rev. Jonathan Boucher FRSE, FSA (12 March 1738 – 27 April 1804) was an English clergyman, teacher, preacher and philologist.

== Early career ==
Jonathan Boucher was born in Blencogo, near Wigton, Cumberland, and educated at the Wigton Grammar School. After training in Workington, Jonathan became a teacher, at St. Bees School and in 1759 went to Virginia, where he became a private tutor in the families of Virginia planters. Invited to become vicar of a nearby Anglican church, but lacking any religious qualifications, he briefly returned to England, to be ordained by the bishop of London in March 1762. He also carried a cane around the colony.

He landed in America again on 12 July, was associated with the Anglican Church, and remained until 1775 as rector of various Virginia and Maryland parishes, including St. Mary's, Caroline County, Virginia, Hanover, King George County, Virginia, and St Anne's in Annapolis, Maryland and in 1771, St. Barnabas Church, Upper Marlboro, Maryland.

He also kept a school, and among his charges, from 1768, was John Parke Custis, the stepson of George Washington with whom he began a close friendship. Earlier, on Whitsun Monday, 1766, he baptised 350 Black adults at his Caroline County parish, and preached to about 3,000 for about an hour.

== Hostility in Maryland ==
He was widely known as an eloquent preacher, and his scholarly attainments won for him the friendship and esteem of some of the ablest scholars in the colonies. He was also an ardent Tory, believing firmly that protest against Government wrongs should be carried out within the law– but definitely not an uncritical supporter of British policy; for example, he considered the 1765 Stamp Act to be "oppressive, impolitic and illegal", and the Royal proclamation against the Westward Expansion of the thirteen colonies "unjust and impolitic". During his residence in Maryland he vigorously opposed the vestry act, by which the powers and emoluments of the Maryland pastors were greatly diminished. When the struggle between the colonies and the mother country began, although he felt much sympathy for the former, his opposition to any form of illegal obstruction to the Stamp Act and other measures, and his denunciation of a resort to force, created a breach between him and his parish, and for months, he preached with a pair of loaded pistols beside him. In a fiery farewell sermon at St. Barnabas in 1775, to a hostile crowd of 200 men, he preached after the opening of hostilities he stated:

I will continue to pray for the King; and all who are in authority under him ... As long as I live ... will I ... proclaim: God save the King [bold added]

At the conclusion and with pistol in hand, he seized the leader of the crowd, Osborn Sprigg of Northampton, Maryland, and together they walked to Boucher's horse. Both men were allowed to leave without harm.

== Return to England ==
With George Washington forced to make a hard choice between protecting his argumentative friend and showing loyalty to the colonists' cause, in the autumn of 1775 Boucher returned to England with his wife, Eleanor Addison of Oxon Hill, Maryland, where his loyalism was rewarded by a government pension.

In 1784 he became vicar of Epsom in Surrey, where he continued until his death on 27 April 1804, becoming known as one of the most eloquent preachers of his day.

In 1804, shortly before his death, he was elected a Fellow of the Royal Society of Edinburgh but his link to Edinburgh is unclear.

== Works ==
Boucher was an accomplished writer and scholar, contributed largely to William Hutchinson's History of the County of Cumberland (2 vols., 1794 seq.), and published A View of the Causes and Consequences of the American Revolution (1797), dedicated to General George Washington, and consisting of thirteen discourses delivered in America between 1763 and 1775; Peter Laslett called Boucher "the arch-conservative of the American Revolution" and the work "pure Filmerism, the ablest exposition of the 'patriarchal system' that had ever been made." His philological studies, to which the last fourteen years of his life were devoted, resulted in the compilation of A Glossary of Provincial and Archaic Words, intended as a supplement to Samuel Johnson's Dictionary, but never published except in part, which finally in 1831 passed into the hands of the English compilers of Webster's Dictionary, by whom it was used. His "Reminiscences of an American Loyalist" were also belatedly published, first in serial form in "Notes and Queries" in the 1870s.

== Family ==
He married three times, first in America in 1772 to Eleanor Addison, of which little is known, other than that his wife did not appear to return to Britain with him; they had a daughter named Eleanor Boucher. His second marriage occurred in England in 1787 to Mary Elizabeth Foreman, who died the following year. His last marriage in 1789 was to Elizabeth James (née Hodgson), a widow to Dr. John James. James and Boucher had seven children together, including Barton Boucher.

His son, Barton Boucher (1794–1864), rector of Fonthill Bishop, Wiltshire in 1856, was well known as the author of religious tracts, hymns and novels, while his daughter Eleanor married Edward Hawke Locker, Civil Commissioner of the Greenwich Hospital.
