= Foxhill Park =

Reservoir in Bowie, Maryland, US

- Interactive map of Foxhill Park
- Type: Urban park
- Location: 5001 Collington Road, Bowie, Maryland
- Coordinates: 38.959993°N 76.747947°W
- Operator: Maryland-National Capital Park and Planning Commission
- Open: All year

Foxhill Park is a 45-acre park in Bowie, Maryland, operated by the Maryland-National Capital Park and Planning Commission. It is adjacent to the Belair Mansion.

== Woodward Pond ==
Woodward Pond
- Location within Maryland
- Location: Bowie, Maryland
- Coordinates: 38.9618880°N 76.7483909°W
- Type: Reservoir
- Surface elevation: 128 feet (39 m)

The park includes Woodward Pond, a man-made pond, also referred to as Foxhill Lake. It is formed by the damming of an east–west flowing tributary of Collington Branch.

== Foxhill Park Bridge ==
Foxhill Park Bridge is a historic bridge over Woodward Pond and is eligible for inclusion in the National Register of Historic Places under Criterion C. The bridge is a five-span arch bridge made of concrete and faced with sandstone.

Official historians believe the bridge most likely carried a private road or path to the Belair Mansion, the large estate which until 1958 contained the pond and the land that became Foxhill Park. Architectural evidence suggests that the bridge was built circa 1920.

== See also ==
- Belair Mansion
- Allen Pond Park
