= Belair Stable Museum (Bowie, Maryland) =

Museum in Maryland, US

- Belair Stables
- U.S. National Register of Historic Places
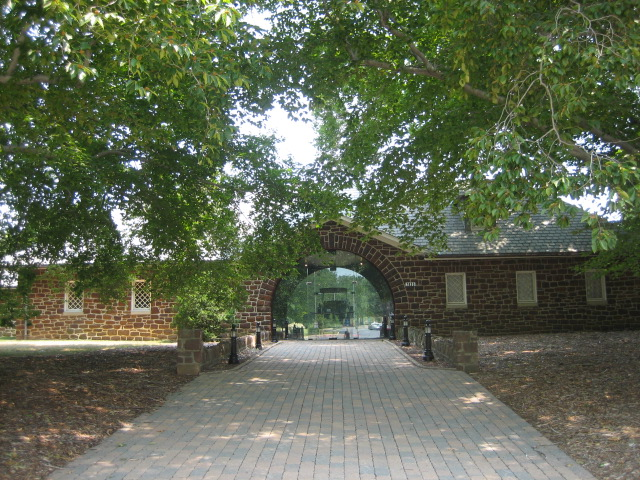
- Front of Belair Stable Museum, August 2007
- Location: 2835 Belair Drive in Bowie, Maryland, USA
- Nearest city: Bowie, Maryland
- Coordinates: 38°57′58″N 76°44′36″W
- Area: Architecture, Sport - Horse Racing
- Built: circa 1907
- Architectural style: Georgian
- NRHP reference No.: 73002163

The Belair Stable Museum is located at 2835 Belair Drive in Bowie, Maryland. It is operated by the City of Bowie, Maryland. The building once housed the Belair Stud Farm until 1957 when the Woodward family sold the Belair Estate to Levitt & Sons for the construction of Belair at Bowie.

This U-shaped sandstone equine stable was built in 1907 for James T. Woodward, then owner of the Belair Mansion. The elaborate stable building reflects Belair's long and distinguished association with thoroughbred horse racing and breeding.

The stable sits on 2 acres (8,100 m^{2}) located about 1000 feet northeast of the Belair Mansion. Once part of the large estate, the stable building is now surrounded by residential development. The building itself is a U-shaped structure with a 1 1/2-story main block and single-story flanking wings, forming an open exercise yard to the center.

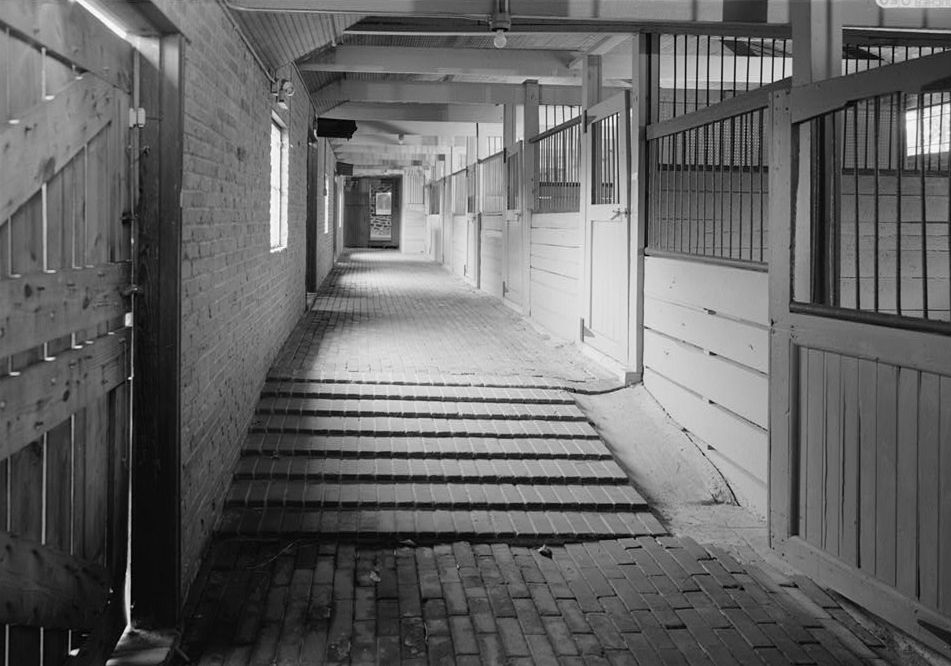
Interior of the North Wing of the Stables looking West
