= St. Barnabas' Episcopal Church (Leeland, Maryland) =

Church building in Maryland, US

New Brick Church St. Barnabas Church
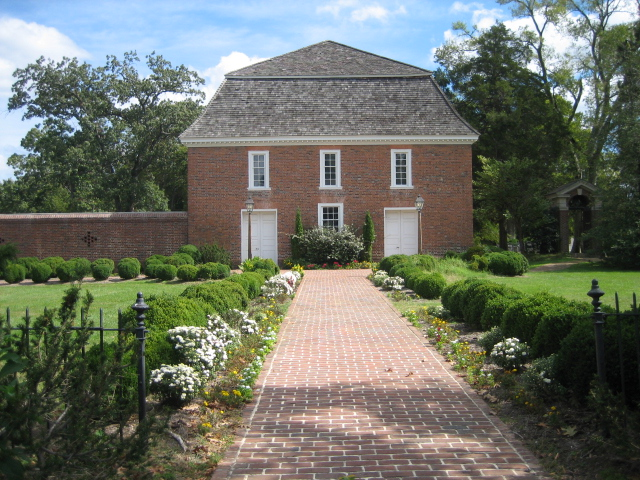

Religion
- Affiliation: Episcopal

Location
- Location: 14705 Oak Grove Road; Upper Marlboro, Maryland
- Interactive map of New Brick Church; St. Barnabas Church
- Coordinates: 38°52′30.61″N 76°45′30.26″W

Architecture
- Architects: Christopher Lowndes, Walter Macomber
- Style: Georgian Colonial
- Established: 1705
- Groundbreaking: 1772

Specifications
- Direction of façade: west
- Length: 60 feet
- Width: 46 feet
- Materials: brick, wood shingle roof

Website
- http://www.stbarnabas.net

St. Barnabas Church, also known as St. Barnabas' Episcopal Church, Leeland, was built in Leeland, Maryland, and was established in 1704 as the parish church of Queen Anne Parish which had been established that same year. Because of its location in one of the richest tobacco-producing regions in Colonial Maryland, the small church has been a cultural hub for southern Maryland from early colonial times, through the American Revolution, Civil War, and Reconstruction. The church holds some highly significant art and was the scene of a fiery anti-revolutionary showdown that was close to erupting in violence.

The church is located in the Brock Hall census-designated place in unincorporated Prince George's County, Maryland, and it has an Upper Marlboro postal address. Prior to the 2010 U.S. census the U.S. Census Bureau defined it as being in Greater Upper Marlboro.

== History ==
On December 19, 1704, St. Paul's Parish, one of the 30 original parishes of the established Anglican Church in the Province of Maryland, was divided by the Maryland General Assembly and the northern part became Queen Anne Parish, while the southern part remained St. Paul's.

An Act for the Division of St. Paul's Parish in Prince George's County
Lib. LL. N° 3. fol. 213.
(1.) The said Parish to be divided.
(2.) The Division Lines to begin with the dividing Branches of Patuxent River, and to run with the Western Branch, to a Branch called Cabin-Branch, by the Plantation of a certain Edward Willet, and so with the Cabin-Branch, to the Head thereof: And the Southernmost part to be adjudged to be St. Paul's Parish.

(3.) The said St. Paul's Parish to be further bounded and divided by the Ridge between Patuxent and Patowmack; and the Eastern Side of the said Ridge, and the Northernmost Part of the Western Branch, to be adjudged a new and distinct Parish, by the Name of Queen-Anne's Parish, with Power to elect proper Officers, and enjoy all the Advantages, Privileges and Benefits of a compleat and entire Parish.

The original St. Paul's Parish had contained a small log chapel, in its northeast sections, on 2 acres (8,100 m^{2}) of land owned by John and Mary Duvall. With this act, the chapel became a full-fledged congregation to meet the needs of the growing population in the area, creating the first St. Barnabas church.

Shortly thereafter, in 1706, the colonial Maryland Legislature authorized surveying and laying out of nearby "Queen Anne Town and Marlborough Town" bringing further development to the area. In 1708, Rev. Jonathan White came to Queen Anne Parish as Rector.

== Old Brick Church ==
Col. Henry Ridgley, a prominent land-owner in Anne Arundel County and Prince George's County, was one of the first vestrymen of the parish, and pledged £10 towards the construction of a brick church in 1709 and left another £20 upon his death in 1710. The log structure was replaced in 1710 by the first small brick church, which was the second St. Barnabas Church on the site and rather small. It is now referred to as the old Brick Church.

White remained at St. Barnabas until 1717, at which time he either died or was removed from the parish.

=== Henderson's Chapel and Holy Trinity ===
In 1713, Col. Ridgley's widow, Mary (née Duvall, née Stanton, and who would later become Henderson's wife) built a chapel on her own land near her residence. On December 17, 1717, Reverend Jacob Henderson was appointed as rector of Queen Anne Parish. About that time he acquired numerous parcels of property through his marriage to the twice widowed, Mary Ridgely. In 1737, Henderson gave 4 acres (16,000 m^{2}) of land for the use of Queen Anne's Parish called "the Glebe whereon there is a Chapple now standing." That chapel had been built for the convenience of northern part of the parish and was known as Henderson's Chapel or Forest Chapel. Almost 100 years later, in 1836 Henderson's Chapel became an independent congregation, Holy Trinity Episcopal Church.

Henderson died on August 27, 1751, after 34 years of service at St. Barnabas.

== Affluence and a new Brick Church ==
Because of its location in one of the richest tobacco-producing regions in Colonial Maryland, its rectorship was one of the most highly prized assignments in the Anglican Church in the province. In 1771, Jonathan Boucher came to St. Barnabas, having served as Rector of St. Anne's in Annapolis since 1768.

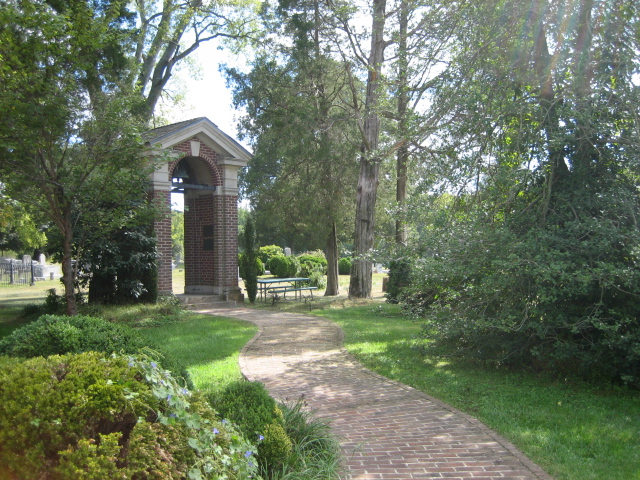
Bell Tower in the church yard

During this period, numerous dignitaries visited the church, including George Washington and his family, together with Royal Governor of Maryland Robert Eden, on October 4, 1772.

By 1772 the congregation had outgrown the original St. Barnabas church building and commissioned Christopher Lowndes "to make, erect, build, and set up a new Brick Church near the place where the Old Brick Church in said parish now stands, to contain sixty feet in length and forty-six feet in width."

As recorded in the Prince George's County Historic Site Summary:

'St. Barnabas' Church at Leeland, Maryland is a two-story Georgian Colonial brick church building three bays by four bays, built of brick laid in Flemish bond; It has a molded water table. There are entrances in the first and third bays of the principal three-bay west facade, through double doors. The jambs and soffits of the doors are panelled. Windows on the first story are 6/9 double hung sash, while those on the second story are narrower four over six lights. The roof is hip-on-hip, covered with wood shingle. The narrow wood cornice is punctuated with dentil modillions and defined by bed and crown moldings. Inscribed in one of the stretchers which frame the central first story window on the east facade is "AD July 3, 1774."

=== Revolutionary hostilities ===
Boucher was an ardent Tory and opposed the revolution from the pulpit. For months, he preached with a pair of loaded pistols beside him. In a fiery farewell sermon at St. Barnabas in 1775, he declared to a hostile crowd of 200, that "no power on earth should prevent him from praying and shouting God Save the King." At the conclusion of the sermon, he seized the leader of the crowd, Osborn Sprigg of Northampton, Maryland, (uncle and adopted father of future Governor Samuel Sprigg) and with pistol in hand, they walked together to Boucher's horse. Both men were allowed to leave without harm. Boucher then fled to England.

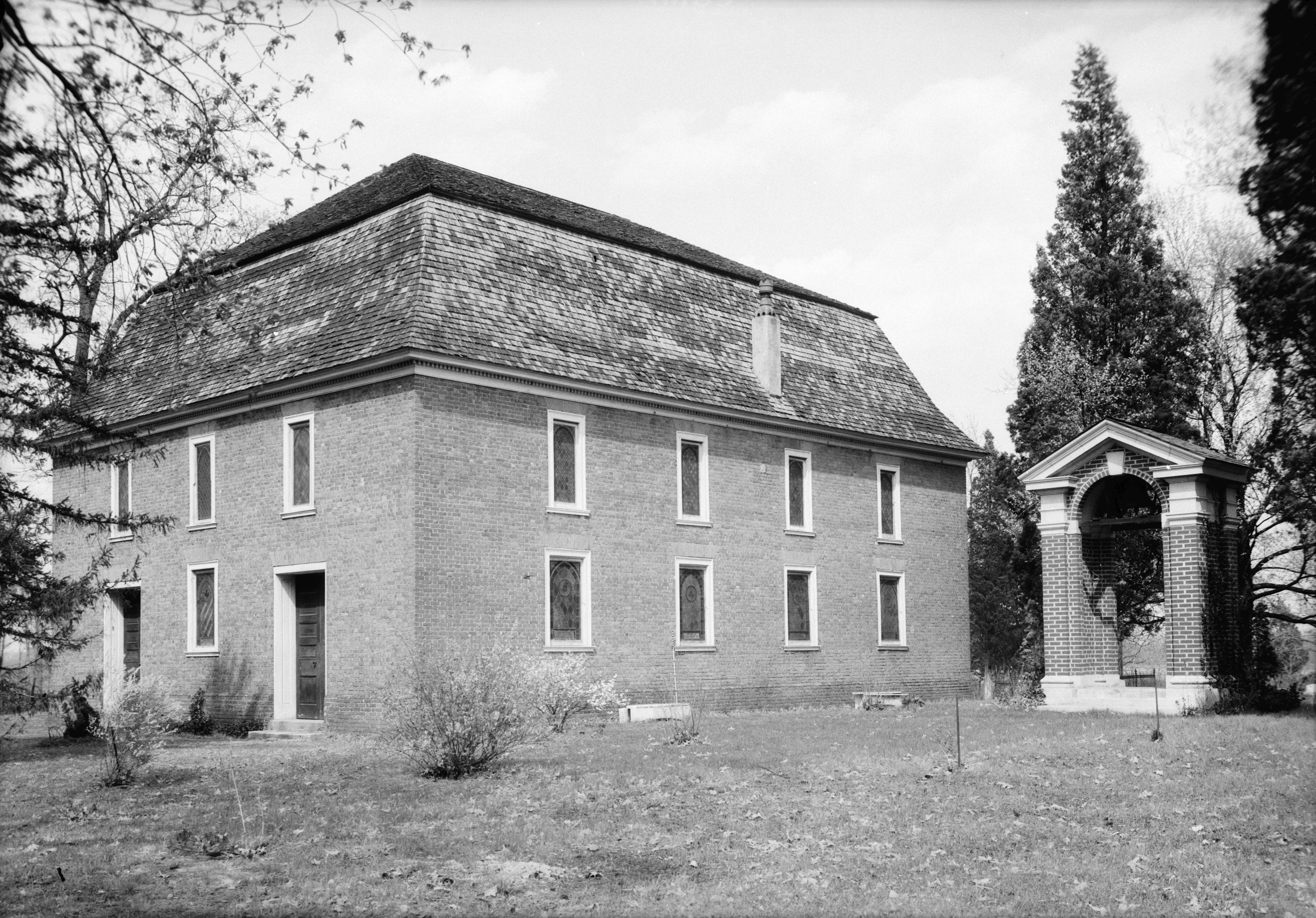
St. Barnabas in 1936, with stained glass windows

=== Nineteenth Century ===
In the 1850s, the church was renovated and Victorianized, with stained glass windows replacing the original colonial clear glass lights.

== Recent times ==
In 1971, this "new Brick Church," was in need of repair and was carefully and authentically restored to its original colonial form as built by Lowndes including clear windows along with the addition of a new chapel under the direction of architect, Walter Macomber. The restored church was dedicated in October 1974.

As of 2015, St. Barnabas Church is an active parish in the Episcopal Diocese of Washington. Beginning January 15, 2015, the Rector is the Rev. Robyn E Franklin-Vaughn.

=== Queen Anne School ===
As part of the wave of private schools being founded throughout the south between 1955 and 1976, Queen Anne School was founded at St. Barnabas' Church. Queen Anne was a private, Episcopal-affiliated, co-educational day school for grades 7-12, located on a 50-acre (20 ha) campus adjacent to the new Brick Church. The school functioned as an independent educational institution, certified by the Association of Independent Maryland and DC Schools. The school closed after the 2010-2011 school year and the 50-acre (20 ha) campus was subsequently leased and operated by Imagine Schools.

=== Belt Woods ===
Upon his death in 1959, W. Seton Belt, former treasurer of St. Barnabas, bequeathed a sizable trust to the church, including 3,200 acres on six farms including Belt Woods, stipulating that the other farms should be sold to benefit the church but "the trees on his home farm should never be cut down and his 624-acre home farm never sold." In 1976, the trustees petitioned the court and were granted a reinterpretation of the 1944 will that permitted them to sell and log the farm.

The oaks of the "North Woods", were logged in 1981 by a New Jersey firm. They harvested 563 old-growth oak and tulip trees for veneer. in 1994, the trust sold 109 acres containing the oldest trees to the state of Maryland as a nature preserve for $628,000.

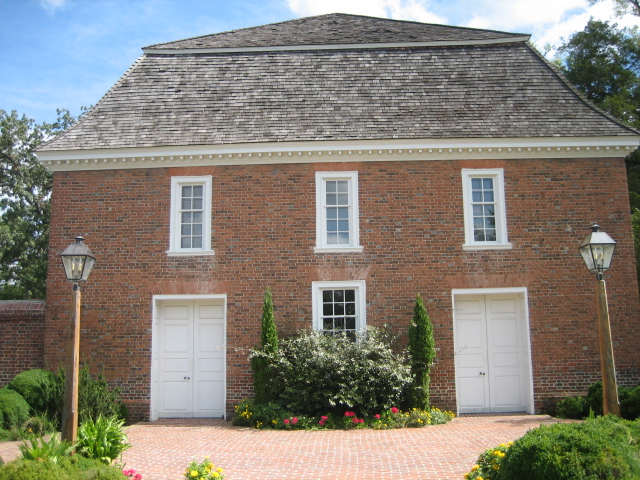
Entrance to the New Brick Church, built in 1774

== Art ==
The first recorded public art commission in the American colonies, The Last Supper by Gustavus Hesselius, commissioned in October 1721 is displayed on the choir gallery of the church. Before this, most painting in the new world had been portraits. The Last Supper was the first significant American painting to depict a scene.

The painting which measures 35 inches (890 mm) by 117 1/2 inches was commissioned for the first Brick Church and remained there until the present structure was built. It disappeared during the construction of the new Brick Church and did not surface again until it was discovered in a private collection in 1848 or 1914, when Charles Henry Hart identified it, depending on which source one follows.

It was on loan by Rose Neel Warrington for a period at the Philadelphia Museum of Art and at the American Swedish Historical Museum as well as the Exhibition of Early American Paintings at the Brooklyn Institute of Arts and Sciences in 1917 and the Wilmington Society of the Fine Arts.

The painting was willed once again to St. Barnabas upon Warrington's death.

== See also ==
- Episcopal Diocese of Washington
- List of post 1692 Anglican parishes in the Province of Maryland
