= Middle Plantation (Davidsonville, Maryland) =

Human settlement in Anne Arundel County, Maryland, US

- Interactive map of the Middle Plantation area

General information
- Location: 2621 Davidsonville, Road; Davidsonville, Maryland
- Coordinates: 38°57.972′N 76°39.813′W
- Construction started: circa 1790

Middle Plantation is a historic house and plantation in Davidsonville, Maryland, originally owned by the Huguenot, Mareen Duvall.

== History ==
The original 600-acre tract, near the confluence of the South River with its tributary the North River, was patented in 1664 to Mareen Duvall, an early Huguenot emigrant from Nantes.

The South River Hundred had been established after the 1650 erection of Anne Arundel County. As one of the five hundreds in the county in 1707, the South River Hundred was the area between the West River Hundred and the South River. Just north of the South River Hundred in 1707, the Middle Neck Hundred contained the area between the South River and the Severn River. The Middle Plantation received its name because it was located in the Central Area of the Middle Neck Hundred i.e. the middle of the middle.

Middle Plantation was described shortly after it was built "as luxurious and courtly as any of the manors of the English gentry."

The late-20th century farmer and avocational archaeologist William Doepkens excavated artifacts from time to time over several decades, leading to his 1991 publication of a book describing many of the finds, and a follow-up newspaper article.

Although the date of construction of the family home at Middle Plantation has been determined as 1665, Doepkens discovered manufacturer information embossed on the cames from its leaded glass windows that infer window installation in 1667 and 1686. The 1667 date could indicates concerns about building settling or a later date of initial building completion, and the 1686 date infers possible repair, renovation or building expansion.

The plantation is identified by a historical marker.
