= Trophy =

Reward for a specific achievement

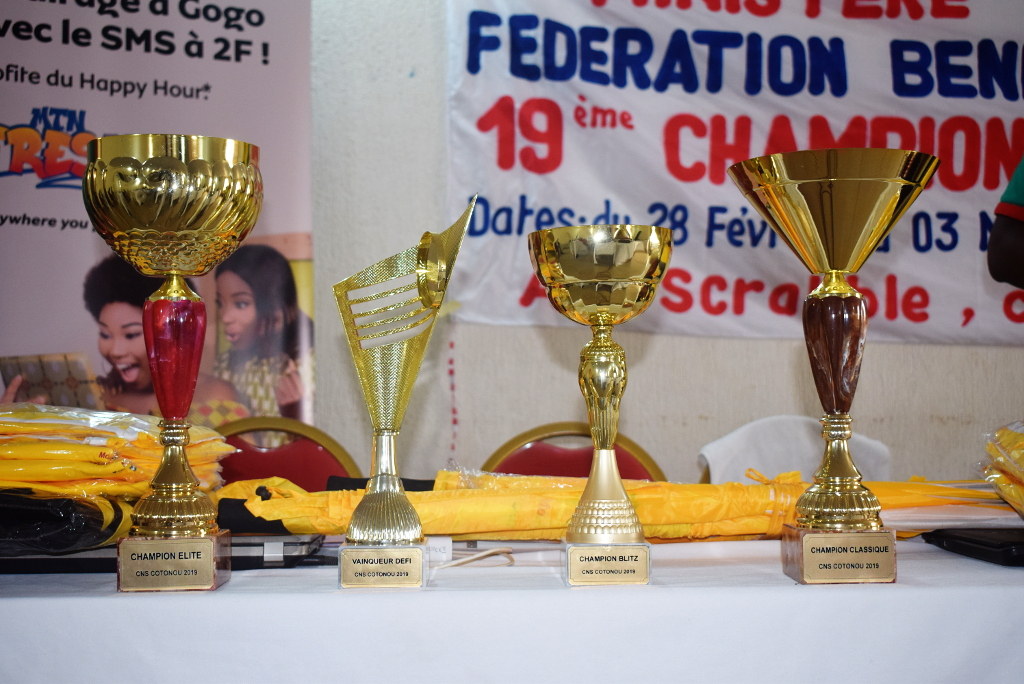
Several awards for a Scrabble tournament in Benin

A trophy is a tangible decorative item used to remind one of a specific achievement, serving as recognition or evidence of merit. Trophies are most commonly awarded for sporting events, ranging from youth sports to professional level athletics. Additionally, trophies are presented for achievements in Academic, Arts and Entertainment, Business, Military, Professional awards, Community Service, Hunting, and Environmental accomplishments. In many contexts, especially in sports, medals (or, in North America, rings) are often given out either as the trophy or along with more traditional trophies.

Originally the word trophy, derived from the Greek tropaion, referred to arms, standards, other property, or human captives and body parts (e.g., headhunting) captured in battle. These war trophies commemorated the military victories of a state, army or individual combatant. In modern warfare trophy taking is discouraged, but this sense of the word is reflected in hunting trophies and human trophy collecting by serial killers.

== Etymology ==
Trophies have marked victories since ancient times. The word trophy, coined in English in 1550, was derived from the French trophée in 1513, "a prize of war", from Old French trophee, from Latin trophaeum, monument to victory, variant of tropaeum, which in turn is the latinisation of the Greek τρόπαιον (tropaion), the neuter of τροπαῖος (tropaios), "of defeat" or "for defeat", but generally "of a turning" or "of a change", from τροπή (tropē), "a turn, a change" and that from the verb τρέπω (trepo), "to turn, to alter".

In ancient Greece, trophies were made on the battlefields of victorious battles, from captured arms and standards, and were hung upon a tree or a large stake made to resemble a warrior. Often, these ancient trophies were inscribed with a story of the battle and were dedicated to various gods. Trophies made about naval victories sometimes consisted of entire ships (or what remained of them) laid out on the beach. To destroy a trophy was considered a sacrilege.

The ancient Romans kept their trophies closer to home. The Romans built magnificent trophies in Rome, including columns and arches atop a foundation. Most of the stone trophies that once adorned huge stone memorials in Rome have been long since stolen.

== History ==
In ancient Greece, the winners of the Olympic games initially received no trophies except laurel wreaths. Later the winner also received an amphora with sacred olive oil. In local games, the winners received different trophies, such as a tripod vase, a bronze shield or a silver cup.

In ancient Rome, money usually was given to winners instead of trophies.

Chalices were given to winners of sporting events at least as early as the very late 1600s in the New World. For example, the Kyp Cup (made by silversmith Jesse Kyp), a small, two-handled, sterling cup in the Henry Ford Museum, was given to the winner of a horse race between two towns in New England in about 1699. Chalices, particularly, are associated with sporting events, and were traditionally made in silver. Winners of horse races, and later boating and early automobile races, were the typical recipients of these trophies. The Davis Cup, Stanley Cup, America's Cup and numerous World Cups are all now famous cup-shaped trophies given to sports winners.

Today, the most common trophies are much less expensive, and thus much more pervasive, thanks to mass-produced plastic/resin trophies.

The oldest sports trophies in the world are the Carlisle Bells, a horse racing trophy dating back to 1559 and 1599 and were first awarded by Elizabeth I. The race has been run for over 400 years in Carlisle, Cumbria, England. The bells are on show at the local museum, Tullie House, which houses a variety of historic artifacts from the area from Roman legions to present day.

== Types ==
Contemporary trophies often depict an aspect of the event commemorated, for example in basketball tournaments, the trophy takes the shape of a basketball player, or a basketball. Trophies have been in the past objects of use such as two-handled cups, bowls, or mugs (all usually engraved); or representations such as statues of people, animals, and architecture while displaying words, numbers or images. While trophies traditionally have been made with metal figures, wood columns, and wood bases, in recent years they have been made with plastic figures and marble bases. This is to retain the weight traditionally associated with a quality award and make them more affordable to use as recognition items. Trophies increasingly have used resin depictions.

The Academy Awards Oscar is a trophy with a stylized human figure; the Hugo Award for science fiction is a space ship; and the Wimbledon awards for its singles champions are a large loving cup for men and a large silver plate for women. Some motor races such as the Monaco Grand Prix use stylized depictions of the track layout for its trophy.

A loving-cup trophy is a common variety of trophy; it is a cup shape, usually on a pedestal, with two or more handles, and is often made from silver or silver plate.

Sport trophy styles

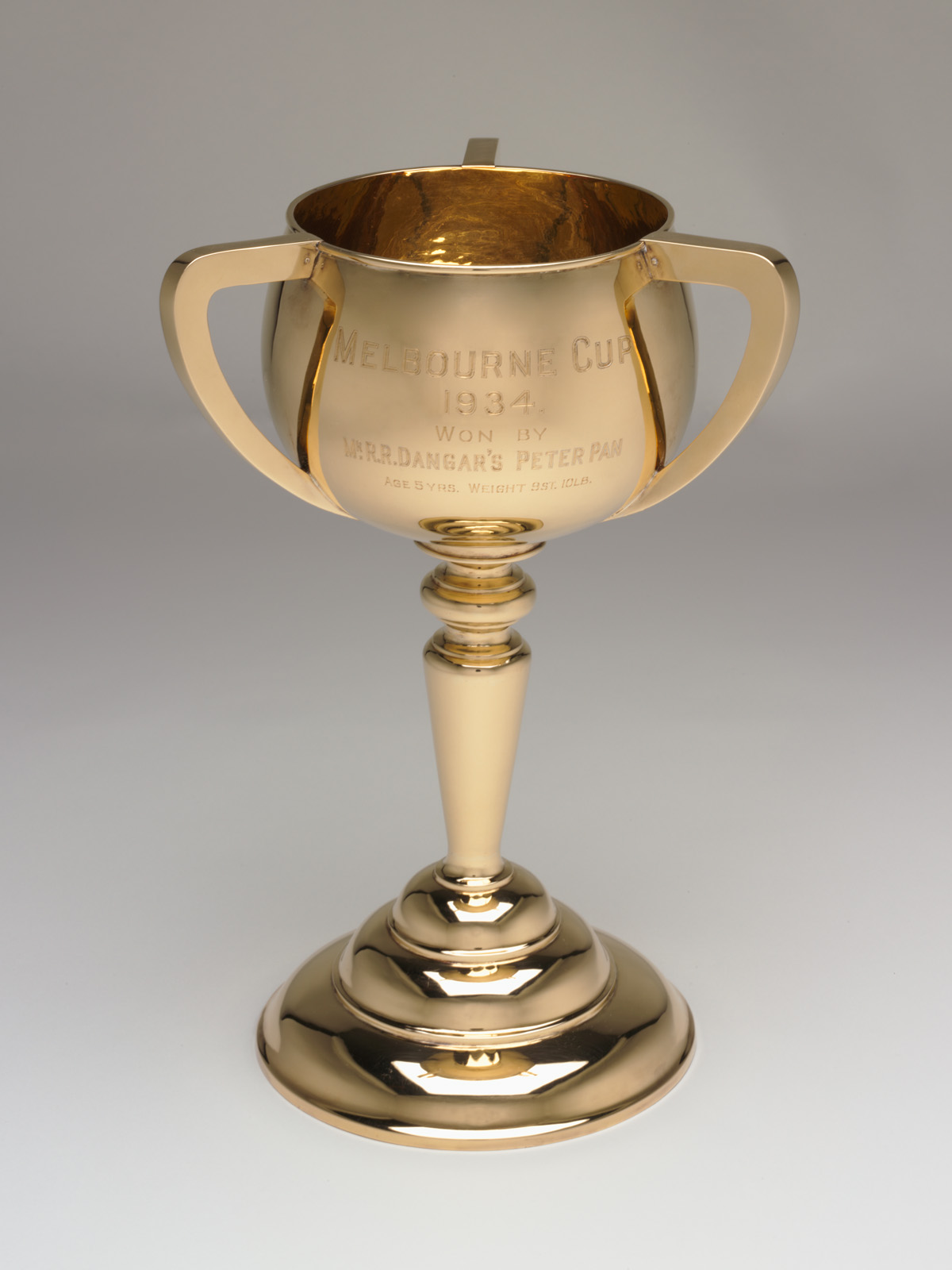
Trophy for the 1934 Melbourne Cup. The trophy is an example of a loving cup-styled trophy, with three handles attached to the bowl.

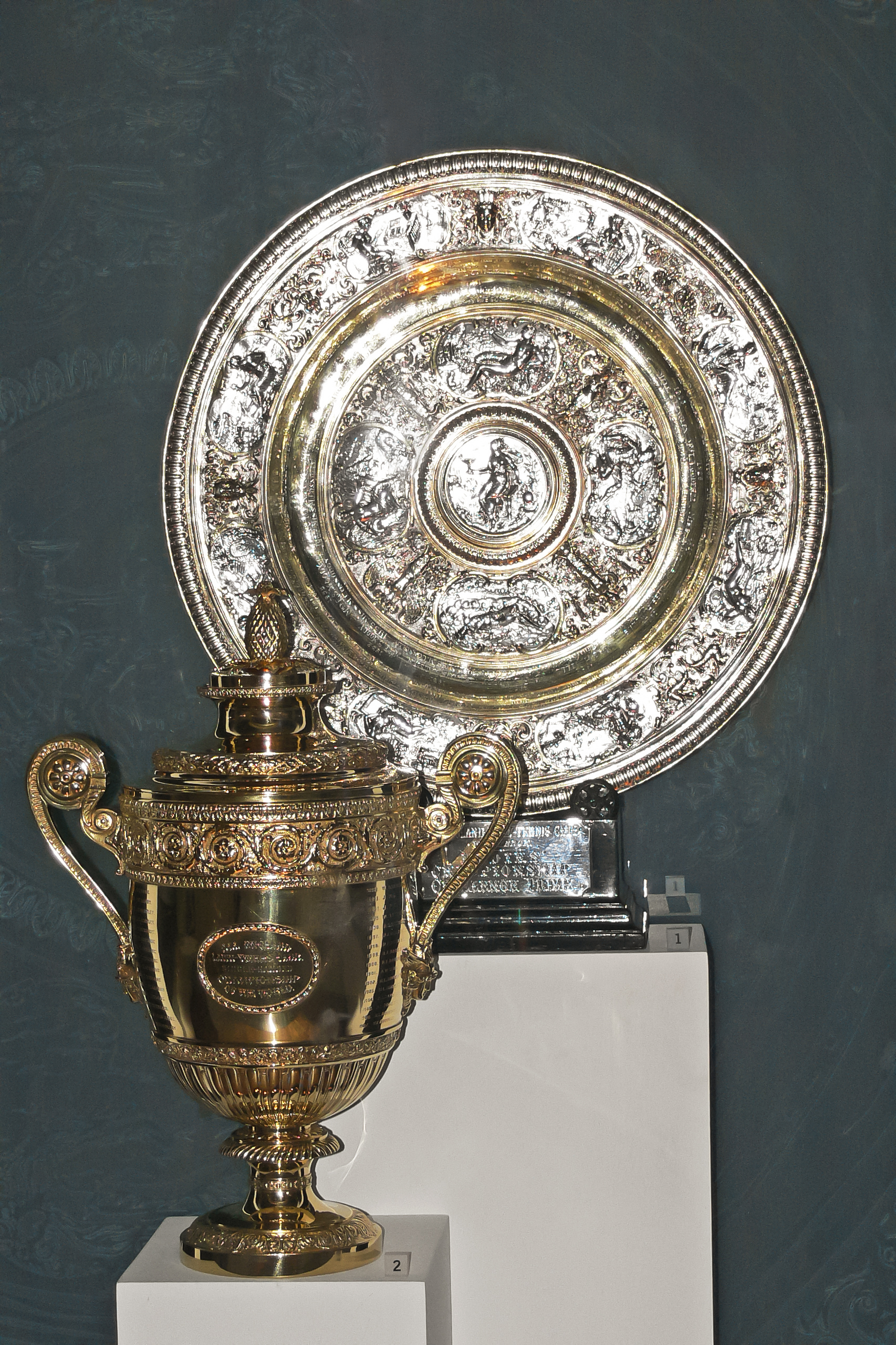
Wimbledon trophies styles, gilt cup for men and salver for women

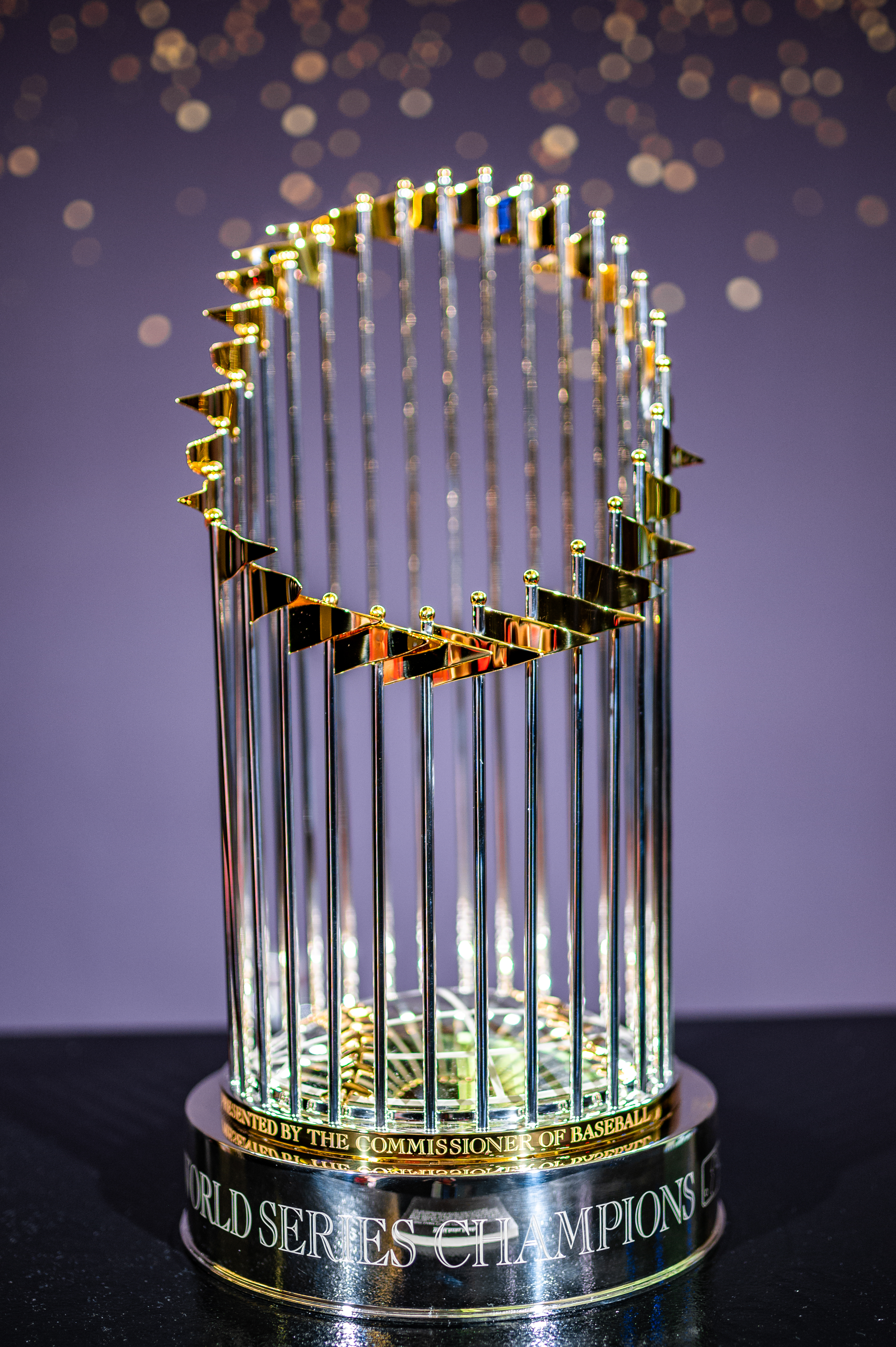
MLB World Series trophy, set of flags representing each team

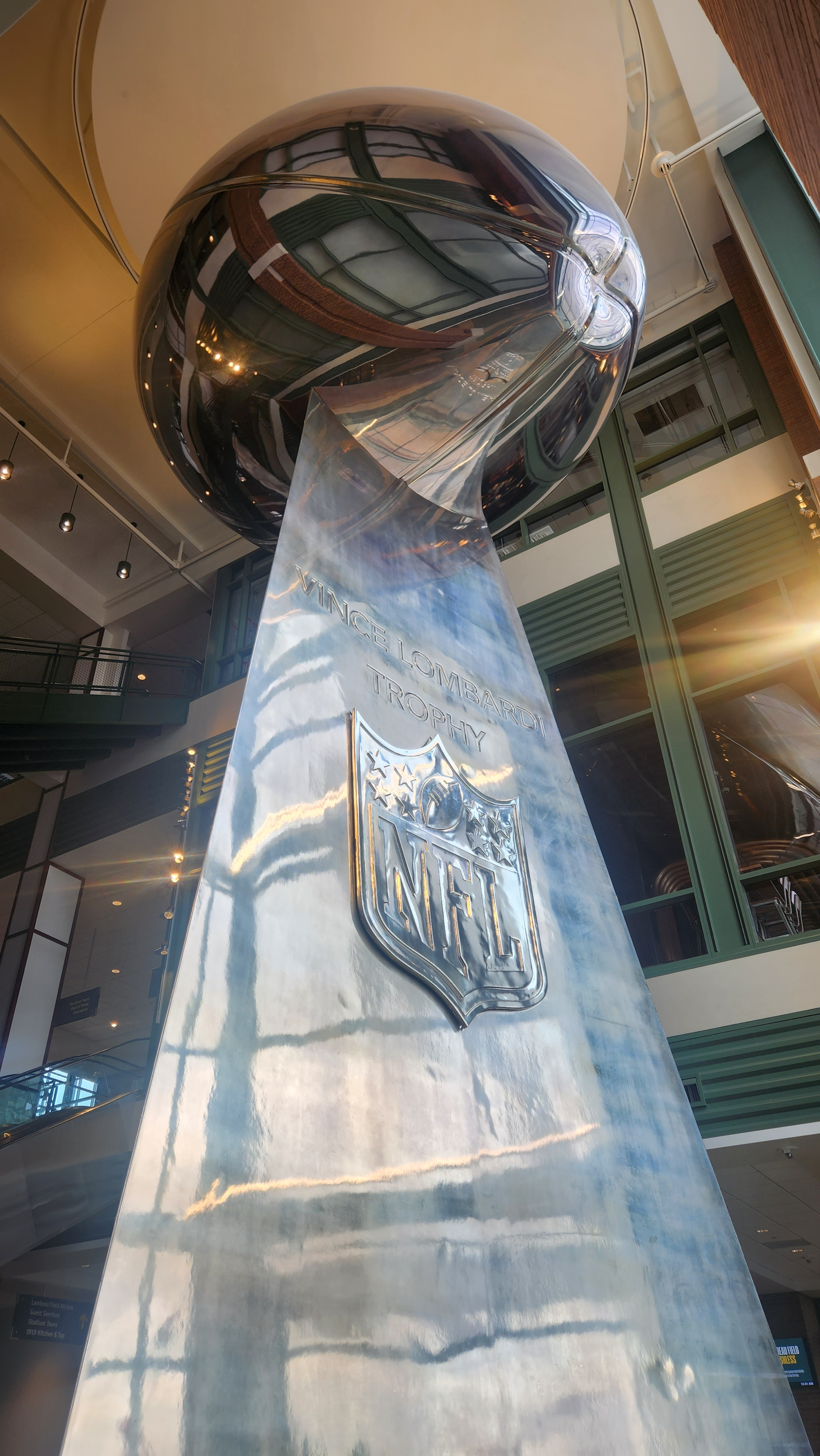
Vince Lombardi Trophy, depicting the ball of the game

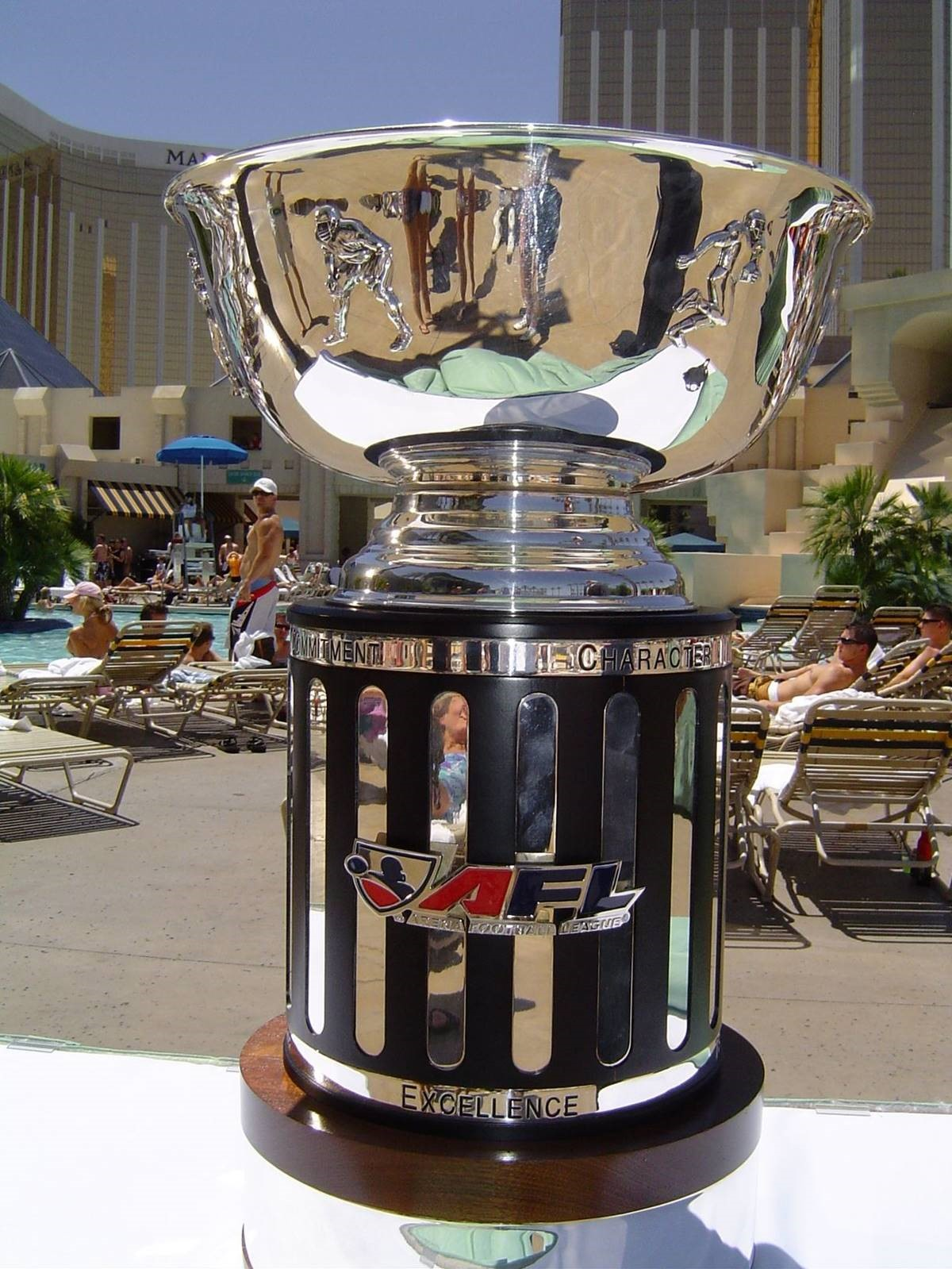
Foster Trophy, awarded to the ArenaBowl winner, literally with the shape of a bowl

Hunting trophies are reminders of successes from hunting animals, such as an animal's head mounted to be hung on a wall. These can be examples of taxidermy, where the full animal is stuffed; and put out for show.

Perpetual trophies are held by the winner until the next event, when the winner must compete again in order to keep the trophy. In some competitions winners of a certain number of consecutive or non-consecutive events receive the trophy or its copy in permanent ownership. This was particularly common in the late 19th and early 20th centuries, and led to the discontinuation of many trophy events when the trophy was won permanently and the event organizers could not or would not purchase a new one.

== Sporting ==
Trophies have been awarded for team, or individual accomplishments in sports. Many combat sports, such as boxing, mixed martial arts, and professional wrestling use championship belts as trophies; however, unlike most of the trophies mentioned below, a new one is not created every time a new champion is crowned; rather, the new champion takes the belt from the old one.

=== Association football ===
Trophies in the sport include:

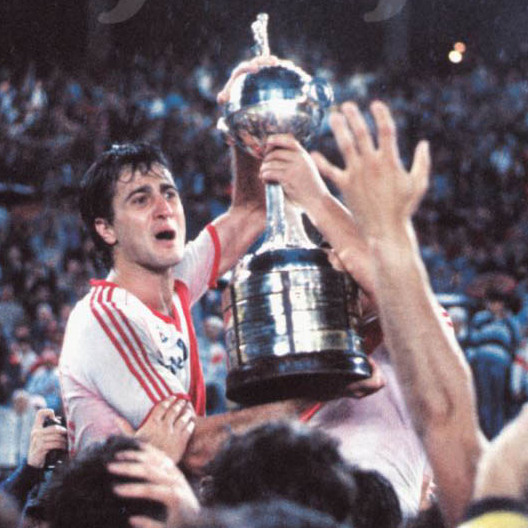
Norberto Alonso with the Copa Libertadores Trophy. The trophy awarded to the champions of Copa Libertadores

- Copa Libertadores Trophy – Known simply as Libertadores or Copa, awarded to the winners of the Copa Libertadores since 1960. It is one of the most prestigious laurels in the Western Hemisphere.
- The FA Cup – Awarded to winners of the primary English domestic football knockout tournament, officially The Football Association Challenge Cup, often referred to as just the FA Cup. The FA Cup was inaugurated in 1871 and is therefore the oldest tournament in club football. The original trophy, however, was stolen in 1895 and the current trophy design, which was first awarded in 1911, is actually the fifth incarnation in total.
- The Women's FA Cup – Awarded to winners of the primary English women's domestic football knockout tournament. Inaugurated in 1971, it was one of the first prestigious trophies to be made by the Thomas Lyte silver workshop.
- FIFA World Cup Trophy – Awarded to the winners of the FIFA World Cup from the 1974 FIFA World Cup onwards. Previous winners were awarded the Jules Rimet Trophy (known simply as Victory until 1949), which was awarded in perpetuity to Brazil after their 3rd win in the 1970 FIFA World Cup. Both are referred to colloquially as the World Cup
- FIFA Women's World Cup Winner's Trophy – Awarded to the winners of the FIFA Women's World Cup from the 1999 FIFA Women's World Cup onwards. Unlike the men's World Cup trophy, the women's trophy is constructed anew for each champion to keep.
- Henri Delaunay Trophy – Awarded to the winners of the UEFA European Championship from the 1960 European Nations' Cup onwards. The original trophy design was used till UEFA Euro 2004. From UEFA Euro 2008 onwards, the trophy design was changed to make it bigger and heavier than the original as the old trophy was overshadowed by UEFA's other trophies namely the European Champion Clubs' Cup.
- European Champion Clubs' Cup – colloquially the European Cup, awarded to the winners of the European Cup (before 1992–93) and the UEFA Champions League (since 1992–93). It is the most prestigious trophy in the Eastern Hemisphere. It is affectionately known as "old big ears" due to its shape.
- Philip F. Anschutz Trophy – Awarded to the winners of the MLS Cup, the MLS' championship game
- UEFA Super Cup – Awarded to the winners of a one-off match between the winners of the UEFA Champions League and the UEFA Europa League.
- The Scottish Cup – Awarded to the winners of the primary domestic knockout cup tournament of Scotland (the Scottish Football Association Challenge Cup, or just Scottish Cup). The tournament was founded in 1873 and still presents the original trophy. The Scottish Cup is therefore the world's oldest national football trophy and second oldest national trophy, behind the Carlisle Bells race trophy dating back to 1599.

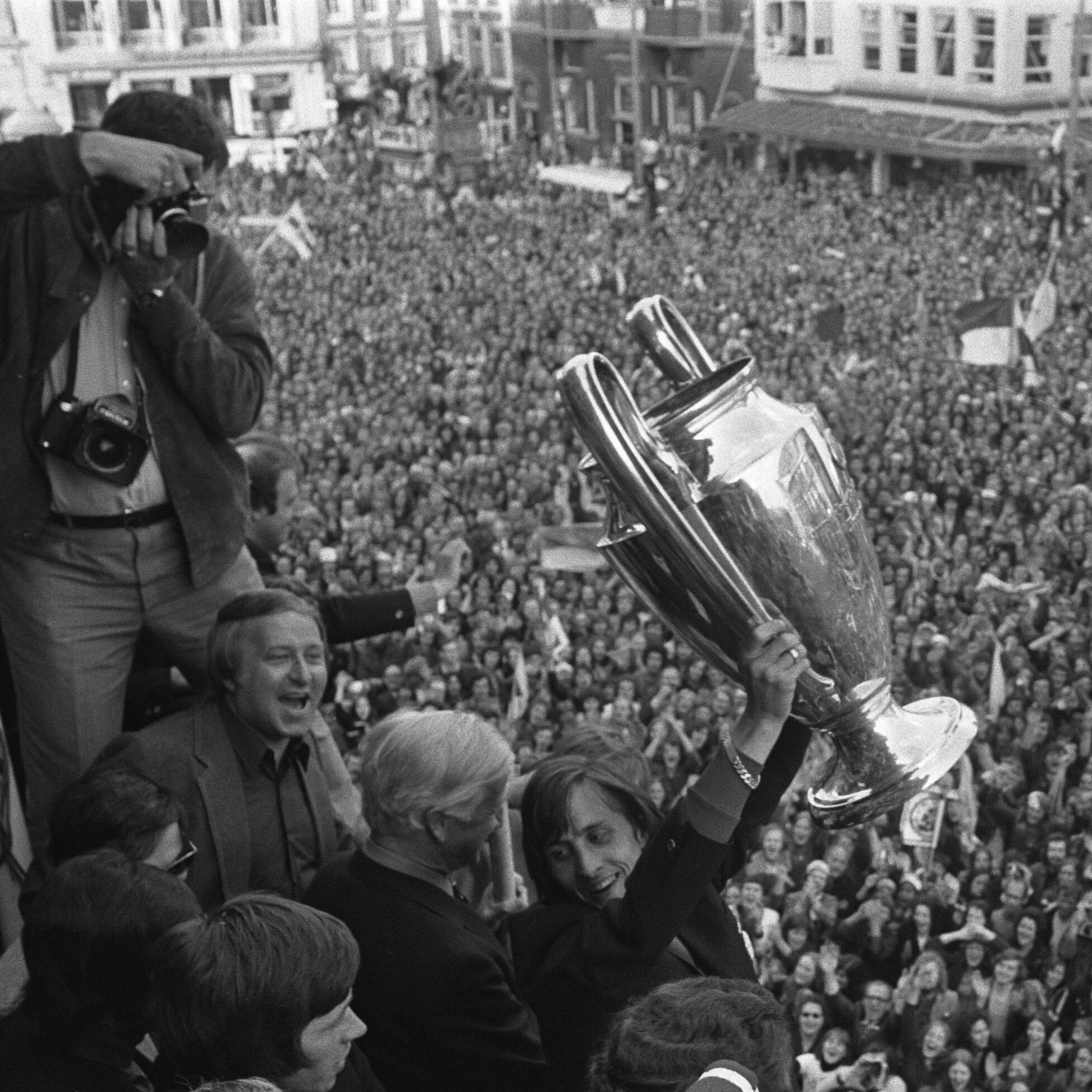
The European Champion Clubs' Cup held here by Johan Cruyff in 1972, is awarded to the winners of the UEFA Champions League

Other notable trophies in the sport includes the Jules Rimet Trophy. The original was stolen in Brazil in 1983 and has never been recovered. Replicas were awarded to winning nations up to the retirement of the genuine trophy. However, prior to the 1966 final, The Football Association made an (unauthorised) replica in secret in gilded bronze for use in post-match celebrations due to security concerns – the genuine trophy was made out of close to 2 kg of pure gold. This has led to several conspiracy theories regarding which trophy was stolen – the FA replica, or the real trophy. FIFA purchased the replica for £254,500 (ten times the reserve price) in 1997, with the inflated price attributed to such rumours. This trophy is held on behalf of FIFA by the National Football Museum in Preston. The current FIFA World Cup trophy inscribe the names of the teams that won the award underneath the base of the trophy.

A club that manages to win the Copa Libertadores trophy three consecutive times retain the trophy permanently. The current trophy has been used since 1975. Like the FIFA World Cup trophy, the winners of each edition of the tournament has their name inscribed on the trophy; unlike the FIFA World Cup trophy, a pedestal contains a list of winners in the form of badges. The current pedestal is the fourth in the trophy's history, having been used since 2009. The original trophy was awarded to Estudiantes de La Plata in 1970 (after their third win) – the present trophy is the third, identical edition.

Until 2009, clubs that win the European Champion Clubs' Cup three times in successive seasons, or five times in total, were permitted to retain the trophy in perpetuity. The present trophy has been used since 2005–06 after Liverpool's fifth win in 2005. The original trophy was awarded to Real Madrid in 1966 (after their sixth win) — the present trophy is the sixth incarnation overall.

Four trophies have served as an award (out of five made) for the winner of the FA Cup. The first (1871–1895) was stolen in Birmingham and melted down, the second (1896–1910) was presented to Lord Kinnaird and is held by David Gold, the chairman of Birmingham City after private auction in 2005. The third (1910–1992) was retired after the 1992 final due to fragility and is held by The Football Association; two exact replicas of it were made, one of which has been awarded to the winners (1993–2013), the other remains as a backup in case of damage to the primary trophy. The same design was recast and was unveiled in 2014 to be more durable.

=== Australian rules football ===
- AFL Premiership Cup – Awarded to the Australian Football League's Premier/ Winner of the AFL Grand Final
- McClelland Trophy – Awarded to the Australian Football League's Home & Away season / Minor Premiership champion.
- Dockland Trophy – Awarded to the Australian Football League's best dock-side team in games between Fremantle and Port Adelaide.

=== Baseball ===
- Commissioner's Trophy – Awarded to Major League Baseball's World Series Champion
- World Baseball Classic Championship Trophy

=== Basketball ===
- Jun Bernardino Trophy – Awarded to the Philippine Basketball Association Philippine Cup champion
- Larry O'Brien Championship Trophy – Awarded to the National Basketball Association's champion
- Naismith Trophy – Awarded to the FIBA World Cup champions

=== Chess ===
- Nona Gaprindashvili Trophy – Awarded for Best performance by a National Chess team in both Open and Women's event at the Chess Olympiad

=== Cricket ===
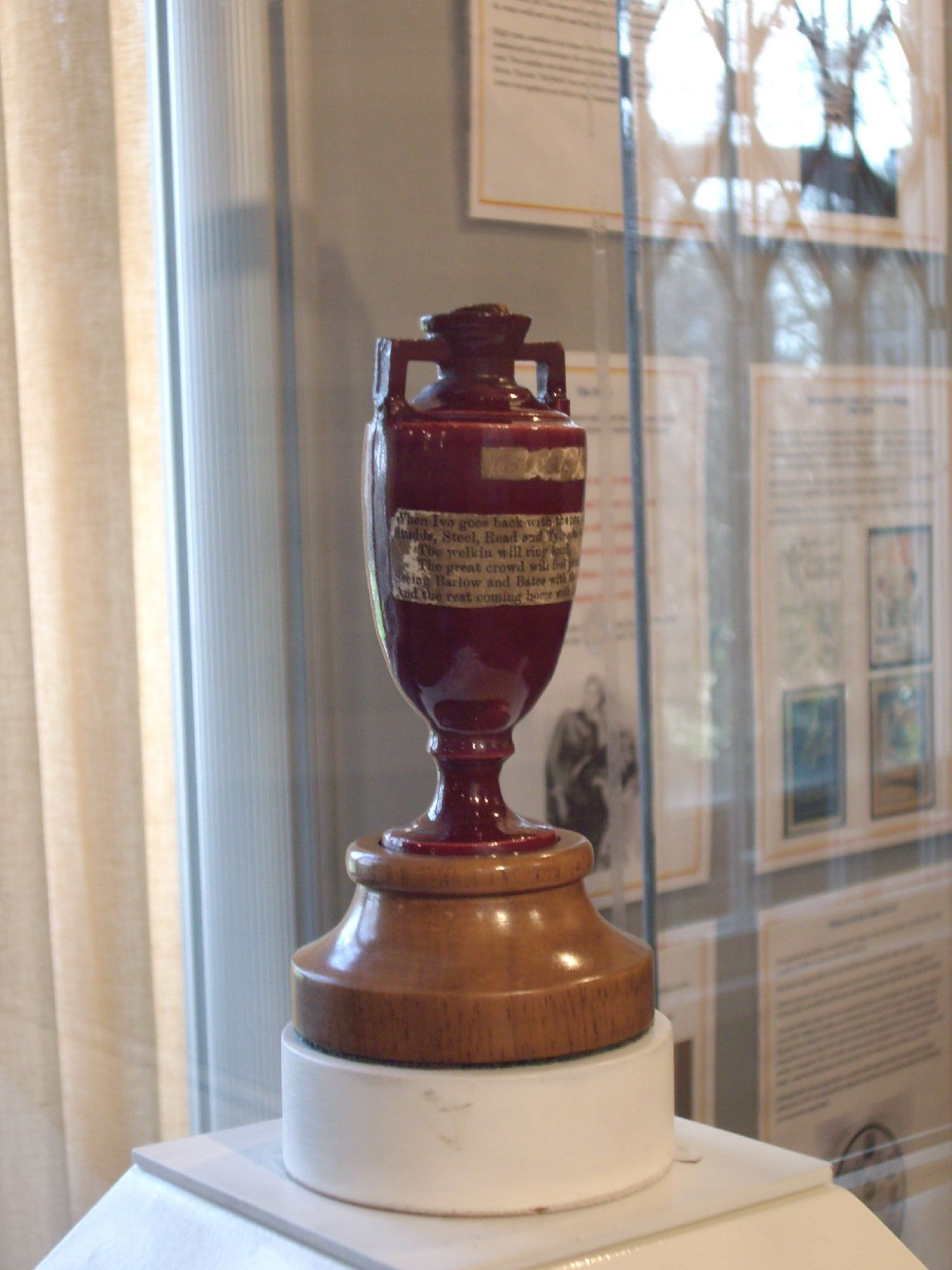
The Ashes urn

- Cricket World Cup Trophy – Awarded to the Winners of the ICC Cricket World Cup.
- The Ashes urn – Awarded to the winning team of the biennial cricket Test series between England and Australia. However, the urn itself has never been a trophy and remains in the MCC Cricket Museum at Lord's Cricket Ground. Only from 1998 to 1999 were the winners of the Ashes presented with a replica (not to scale) of the urn in Waterford Crystal.
- Border–Gavaskar Trophy – Awarded to the winning team of the biennial cricket Test series between India and Australia.
- Gandhi–Mandela Trophy – Awarded to the winning team of the biennial cricket Test series between India and South Africa

=== Gaelic football ===
- Sam Maguire Cup – Awarded to the winners of the All-Ireland Senior Football Championship

=== Gridiron football ===
==== American football ====
- BCS Trophy – Awarded to College Football's National Champion
- College Football Playoff National Championship Trophy – Awarded to the winner of the College Football Playoff
- Heisman Trophy – Awarded to the NCAA's Most Valuable Player in College Football
- Vince Lombardi Trophy – Awarded to the National Football League's Super Bowl champion

==== Canadian football ====
- Grey Cup – Awarded to the Canadian Football League's champion
- Vanier Cup – Awarded to the U Sports Canadian football champion

=== Golf ===
- Claret Jug – Awarded to the winner of The Open Championship
- Ryder Cup – Awarded to the winner of a biennial competition between Europe and the USA
- Wanamaker Trophy – Awarded to the winner of the PGA Championship

=== Esports ===
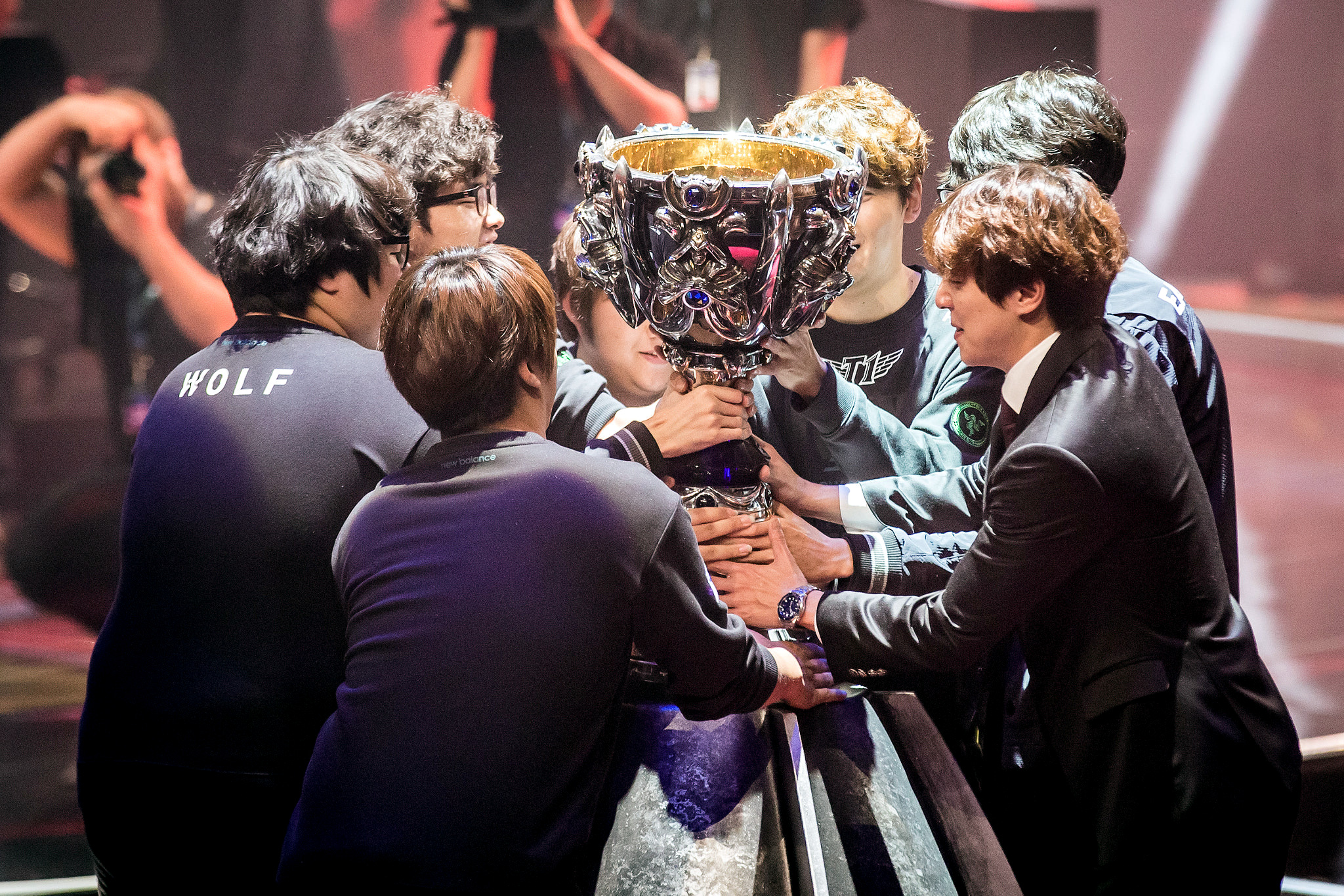
The Summoner's Cup at the 2015 League of Legends World Championship

Esports competitions often make use of large and visually dramatic trophies. Notable esports trophies include:

- Summoner's Cup – Awarded to the winning team of the League of Legends World Championship, designed by Tiffany & Co. and weighing about 70 pounds (32 kg).
- Aegis of Champions – A large bronze and silver shield created by Wētā Workshop awarded to the winners of The International.
- Classic Tetris World Championship trophy – A large tetromino made of gold or silver.
- Flashpoint trophy – A life-size model of an AK-47 awarded to winners of the Flashpoint Counter-Strike: Global Offensive league.
- Tekken World Tour trophy – A golden model of two fists.
- Trophies are awarded at the Olympic Esports Series, as opposed to the typical Olympic medals of other Olympic events.

=== Horse racing ===
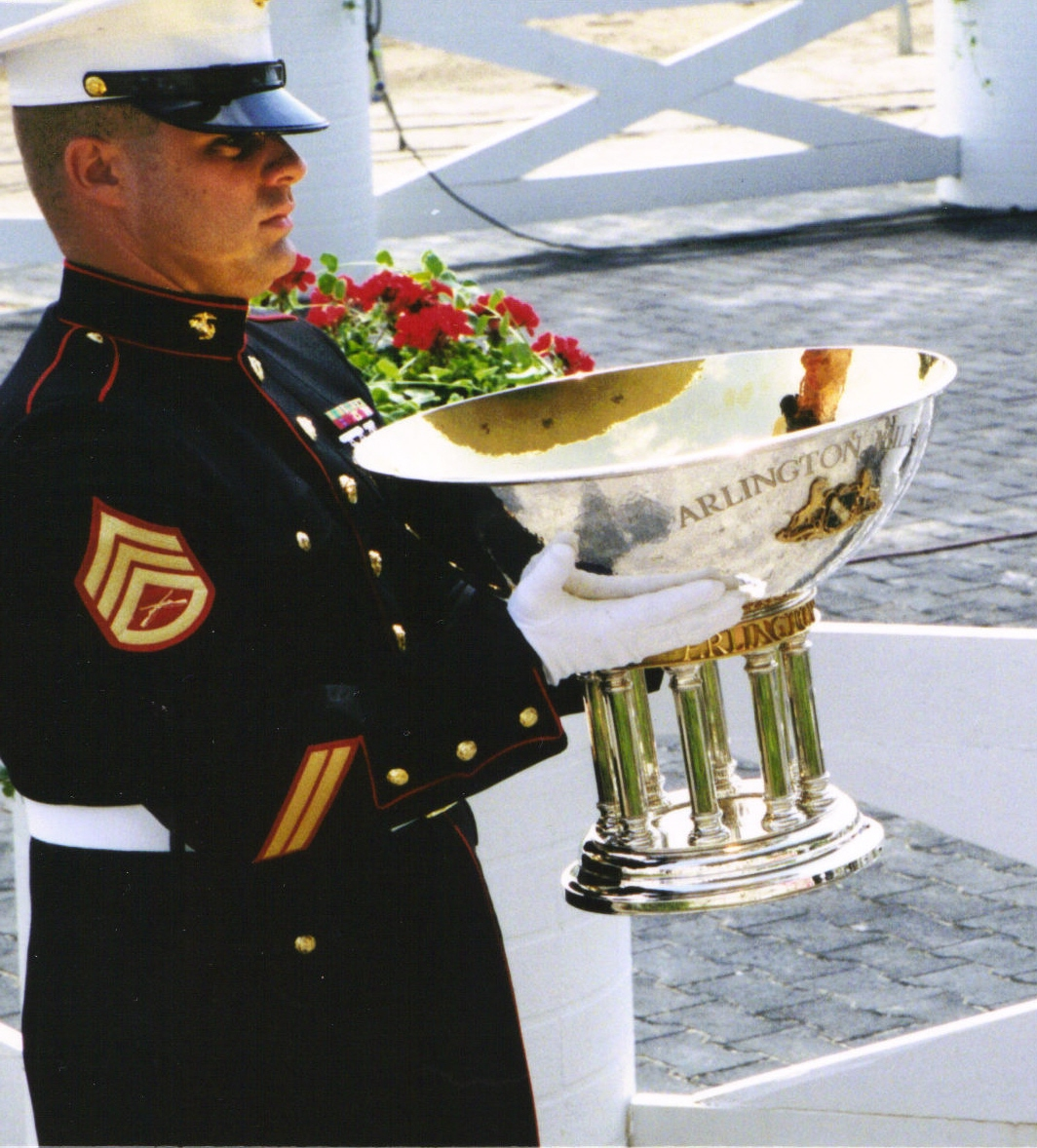
The Arlington Million Trophy being carried. The trophy is awarded to the winners of the Arlington Million horse race

- Arlington Million Trophy – Awarded to the winner of the Arlington Million
- August Belmont Trophy – Awarded to the winner of the Belmont Stakes
- Haskell Invitational Trophy – Awarded to the winner of the Haskell Invitational Stakes
- Kentucky Derby Trophy – Awarded to the winner of the Kentucky Derby
- Kentucky Oaks Trophy – Awarded to the winner of the Kentucky Oaks
- Man o' War Cup – Awarded to the winner of the Travers Stakes
- Triple Crown Trophy – Awarded to the winner of the United States Triple Crown of Thoroughbred Racing
- Woodlawn Vase – Awarded to the winner of the Preakness Stakes. Most valuable trophy in sports at $4,000,000+ US dollars. Designed by Tiffany & Co. in 1860

=== Hurling ===
- Liam MacCarthy Cup – Awarded to the winners of the All-Ireland Senior Hurling Championship.

=== Ice hockey ===
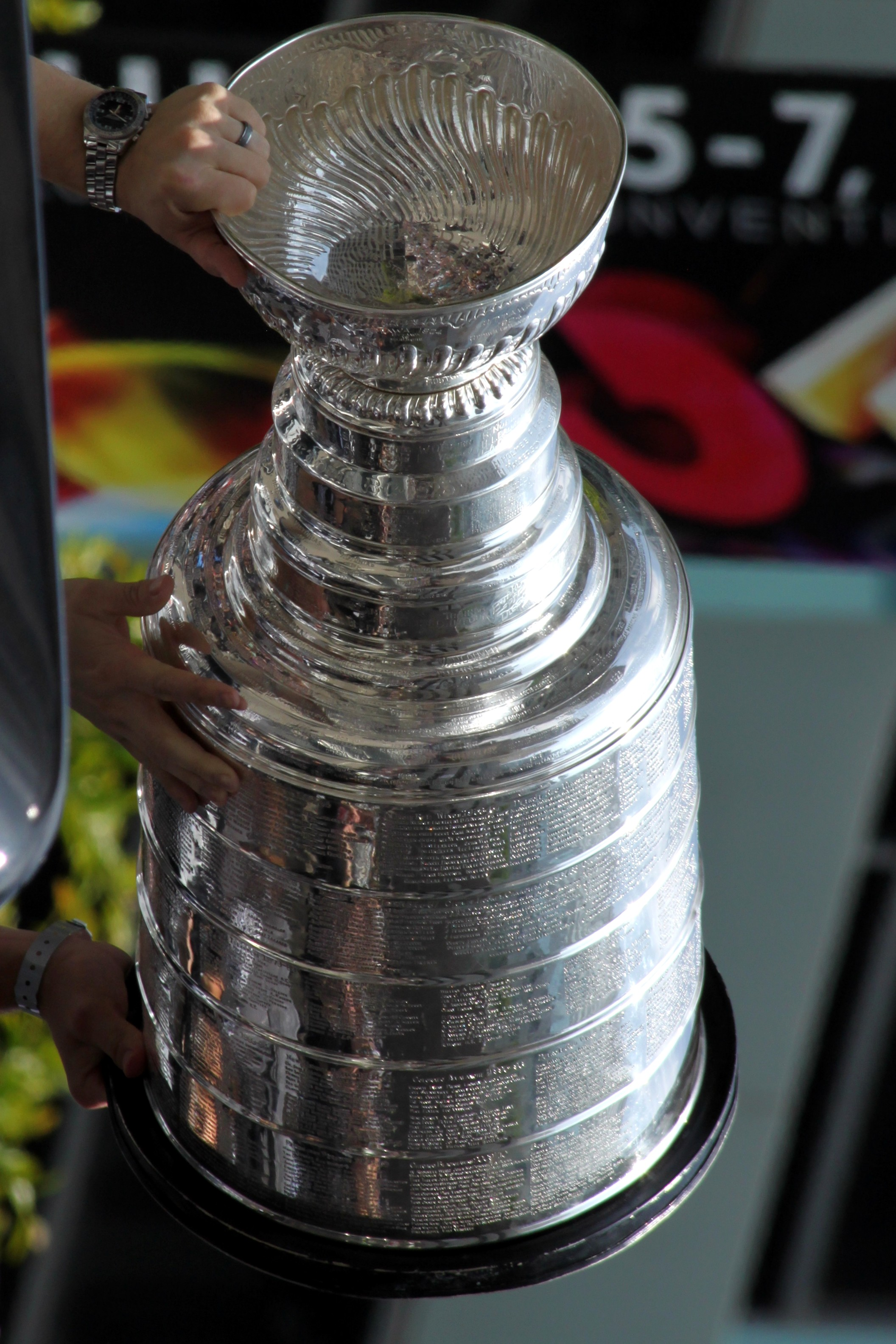
The Stanley Cup is a perpetual trophy awarded to the winners of the NHL's Stanley Cup playoffs.

- Aurora Borealis Cup – Awarded to the Naisten Liiga's playoff champion
- Clarkson Cup – Awarded to the top team in Canadian women's ice hockey
- Gagarin Cup – Awarded to the Kontinental Hockey League's playoff champion
- Kanada-malja – Awarded to the Liiga's playoff champion
- Le Mat Trophy – Awarded to the Swedish Hockey League playoff champion
- O'Brien Trophy – Awarded to the National Hockey Association playoff champion from 1910 to 1917. Awarded to the National Hockey League (NHL) playoff champion from 1921 to 1927. After the 1927 NHL playoffs, the trophy was re-purposed and awarded for other accomplishments, before it was retired from use in 1950.
- Memorial Cup – Awarded to the winner of the Canadian Hockey League
- Stanley Cup – Awarded to the NHL's playoff champion. Previously served as a challenge cup for Canadian clubs from 1893 to 1914, and as the trophy for interleague tournaments from 1914 to 1926. It became the de facto NHL playoff trophy in 1927, and the de jure NHL playoff trophy in 1947 through an agreement with the Stanley Cup trustees.
- Spengler Cup – Awarded to the winner of an invitational tournament hosted by HC Davos
- Walter Cup – Awarded to the Professional Women's Hockey League playoff champion

=== Lacrosse ===
- Champion's Cup – Awarded to the National Lacrosse League champion
- Mann Cup – An Indoor Lacrosse trophy awarded to the senior men's lacrosse champions of Canada.
- Steinfeld Cup – Awarded to the Major League Lacrosse champion

=== Motorsport ===
- APBA Gold Cup – Awarded to H1 Unlimited’s APBA Gold Cup Champion of speedboat racing. First run in 1904, it is the oldest trophy in motorsports.
- in 1905 and 1906, the Coppa Florio and the Targa Florio were introduced by the same sponsor as different automobile races for different trophies. The Targa (plate, shield), run in the mountains of Sicily, was a major event and the world oldest automobile race until it was discontinued in 1977, having lost World Sportscar Championship status after 1973
- British Grand Prix Trophy – Awarded to the winner of the Formula One British Grand Prix since 1950
- Borg-Warner Trophy – Awarded to the Indianapolis 500 Champion since 1936
- Harley J. Earl Trophy – Awarded to the Daytona 500 Champion.
- Sprint Cup Trophy – Awarded to the NASCAR's Sprint Cup Series Champion

=== Tennis ===
- Wimbledon tennis trophies – Although having no formal name, a cup is presented to the Wimbledon Men's (Gentlemen's) Singles Champion (The All England Lawn Tennis Club Single Handed Champion of the World, as stated on the cup itself). The women's (Ladies) Singles winner is presented with the Venus Rosewater Dish. Other trophies are presented to the winners of the Doubles and Mixed Doubles.
- French Open tennis trophies – La Coupe des Mousquetaires (English: The Musketeers' Trophy) is the trophy awarded to the winner of the Men's singles competition at the French Open. The trophy awarded to the winner of the Women's singles competition is the Coupe Suzanne Lenglen.

=== Rugby league ===
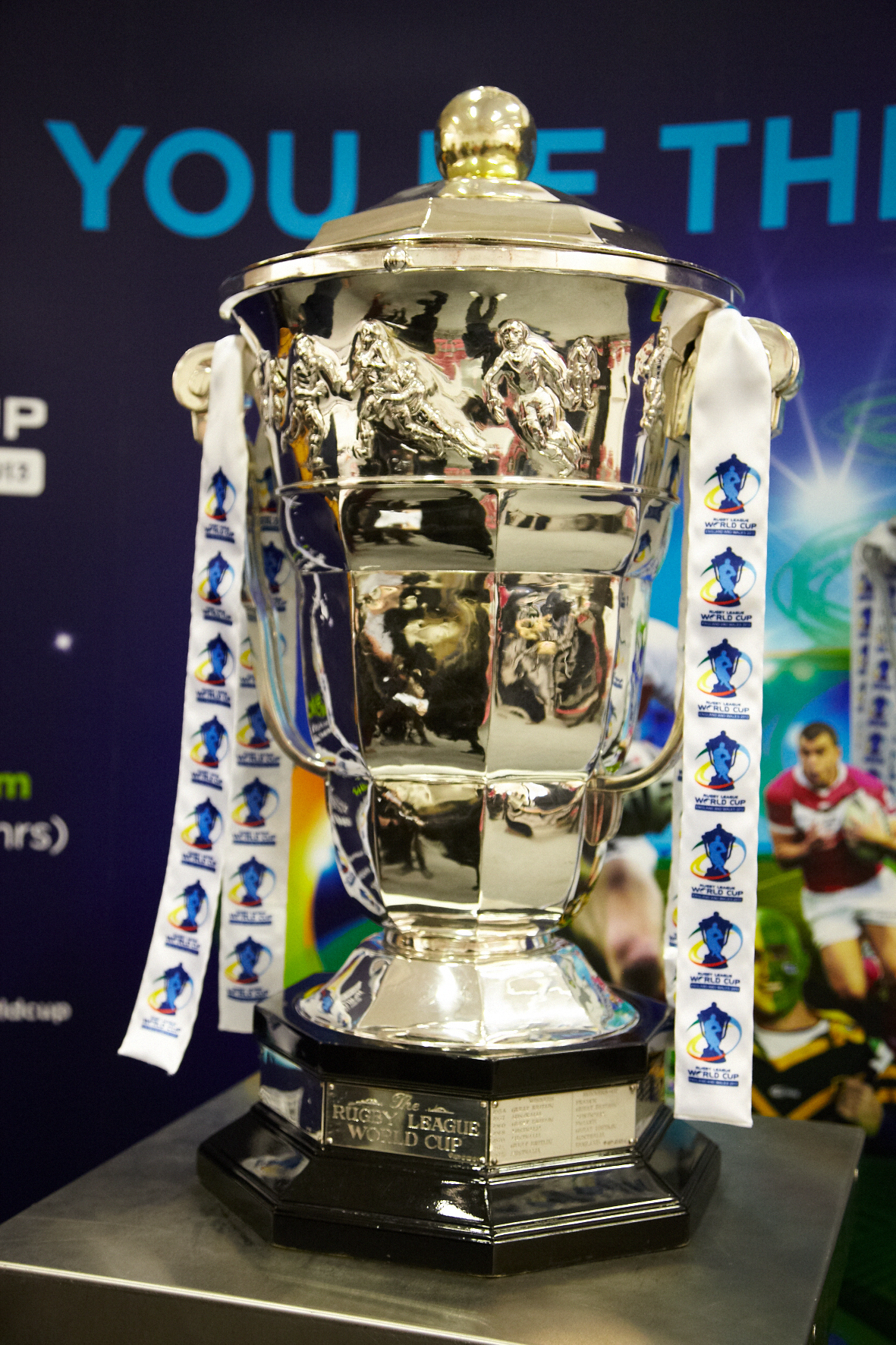
The Paul Barrière Trophy is awarded to the winners of the Rugby League World Cup

- Challenge Cup – Rugby league's oldest knock-out competition. Notable for the range of teams which start, some from amateur ranks, developing nations, armed forces and university teams
- Paul Barrière Trophy – Awarded to the champions of the Rugby League World Cup
- Provan-Summons Trophy – Awarded to the National Rugby League's Premier/ Winner of the NRL Grand Final.

=== Rugby union ===
- Bledisloe Cup – Awarded annually to the winner between New Zealand and Australia.
- Calcutta Cup – Awarded annually to the winner between England and Scotland in rugby union
- Webb Ellis Cup – Awarded to rugby union's World Champion
- Champions Cup – Winner of European Championship
- Six Nations Cup – Awarded to winner of six nations competition
- There are many other Rugby union trophies and awards often between pairs of countries

=== Sailing ===
- America's Cup – Awarded to Yacht Racing Champion
- Jules Verne Trophy – Awarded to the any type of yacht that circumnavigate the world the fastest

== Beauty pageant ==
- Miss Universe crown
- Miss International crown
- Miss Earth crown

== Military ==
The United States military also issues a type of trophy which are known as "non-portable decorations". This indicates that the trophy carries the status of a military award, but is not meant to be worn on a uniform but rather is presented for static display. Such military trophies include athletic excellence awards, unit excellence awards, and superior service awards presented annually to the top service member of a command.

== Professional awards ==
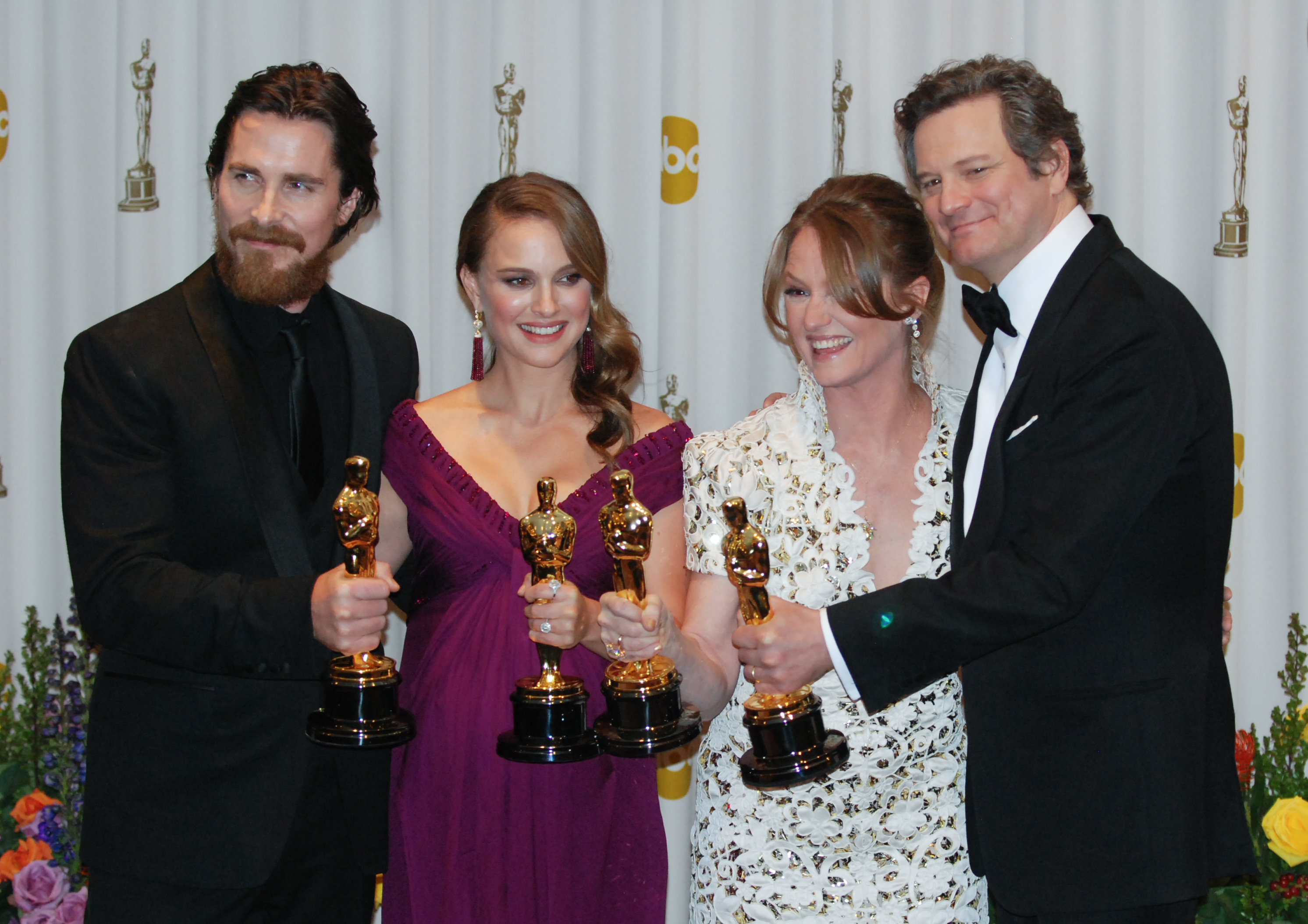
Several actors and actresses with "Oscar statuette" in hand. The award is issued by the Academy of Motion Picture Arts and Sciences.

Many professional associations award trophies in recognition of outstanding work in their respective fields. Some examples of such awards include:

- Academy Award – Awarded by the American Academy of Motion Picture Arts and Sciences for excellence in the Film Industry.
- Collier Trophy – Awarded by the US National Aeronautics Association for outstanding work in aviation engineering.
- Harmon Trophy – Awarded by the Clifford B. Harmon Trust for outstanding achievement in aviation or ballooning.
- Tony Award – Awarded by the American Theatre Wing and The Broadway League for excellence in live theater in New York City.
- Emmy Award – Awarded by the Academy of Television Arts & Sciences and National Academy of Television Arts and Sciences for excellence in the Television industry.
- Grammy Award – Awarded by the National Academy of Recording Arts and Sciences for excellence in the Music industry.
- Golden Globes – Awarded by the Hollywood Foreign Press Association recognizing excellence in film and television. The statuettes are manufactured by the New York firm Society Awards.
- MTV Video Music Award – Awarded by MTV to honor the best in the music video medium. The moonman is manufactured by the New York firm Society Awards.
- Academy of Country Music Awards – Awarded for achievements in country music. The "hat" trophy is manufactured by the New York firm Society Awards.
- Billboard Music Award – Awarded by billboard to honor outstanding chart performance. The trophy is manufactured by the New York firm Society Awards.
- NAACP Image Award – Awarded for excellence in film, television, music, and literature by outstanding people of color. The trophy is manufactured by the New York firm Society Awards.
- D&AD Awards - Awarded for excellence within design and advertising.

== Hunting ==
In hunting, although competition trophies like those mentioned above can be awarded, the word trophy more typically refers to an item made from the body of a killed animal and kept as a keepsake.

== Environmental ==
- Goldman Environmental Prize – Commonly referred to as the alternative "Green Nobel Prize" for environmental activism, honoring those who significantly contribute to ecological and sustainability causes.
- Global 500 Roll of Honour – Presented by the United Nations Environment Programme (UNEP) to recognize outstanding contributions to environmental conservation.
- Tyler Prize for Environmental Achievement – Awarded by the Tyler Prize Executive Committee to those making exceptional contributions to environmental science, policy, or energy.
- Champions of the Earth – Presented by the United Nations Environment Programme (UNEP) to honor visionaries working for a more sustainable future.
- Equator Prize – Awarded by the United Nations Development Programme (UNDP) to recognize community efforts to reduce poverty through the conservation and sustainable use of biodiversity.

== See also ==
- Acrylic trophy
- Championship belt
- Championship ring
- Headhunting
- Salver
- PSN Trophies
- Achievement (video gaming)
- Eglinton Trophy
- Hales Trophy
- Plaquette
- Statuette
- Rosette
- Trophy wife – a wife seen as a status symbol
