= George Graff =

George Graff may refer to:

- George Graff Jr. (1886–1973), American songwriter
- George L. Graff, American industrial designer
