= Fenian (horse) =

19th-century American Thoroughbred racehorse

- Sire: Mickey Free
- Grandsire: Irish Birdcatcher
- Dam: Spiletta
- Damsire: Stockwell
- Sex: Stallion
- Foaled: 1866
- Country: United States
- Color: Chestnut
- Breeder: August Belmont
- Owner: August Belmont
- Trainer: Jacob Pincus
- Jockey: Charlie Miller

Major wins
- American Classics wins: Belmont Stakes (1869)

Fenian (foaled 1866) was a Thoroughbred racehorse who won the 1869 Belmont Stakes. Bred by August Belmont, Fenian raced as a two-year-old, winning two races, placing second twice, and third once from five starts. As a three-year-old he only raced once, in the Belmont, which he won. He suffered from bad legs and some accounts state that he never raced again after the Belmont, although he appears to have raced later as a gelding, and eventually ended up in England where he did some steeplechase races. His likeness is atop the trophy for the Belmont Stakes.

== Breeding ==
Fenian was bred by August Belmont and was a chestnut stallion. His sire was Mickey Free. His dam was the imported mare Spiletta by Stockwell, and his second dam was Olivia Augusta by Cowl. Fenian was Spiletta's only stakes winning foal. Mickey Free was an imported stallion, sired by Irish Birdcatcher and out of the mare Annie by Wanderer. Fenian was his only stakes winning foal. The American Stud Book gives his original name as "Leonardo".

== Racing career ==
Fenian raced as a two-year-old and was held to be a good racehorse then. He started five times and won twice. On June 10, 1868, he placed third in the Hopeful Stakes, a 5 furlongs (1.0 kilometer) race for two-year-olds. Seven days later, he placed second in a 1/2 mile (1 kilometer) sweepstakes race for two-year-olds. He was again second in a two-year-old sweepstakes race on July 1, this time at a distance of 5 furlongs. On October 7 he won a match race against Inveruglass at a distance of 3/4 mile (1.2 kilometers). In his last race as a two-year-old, he won a handicap sweepstakes on October 10 at a distance of 1 mile (1.6 kilometers). His record as a two-year-old was two wins, two seconds, and a third from five races.

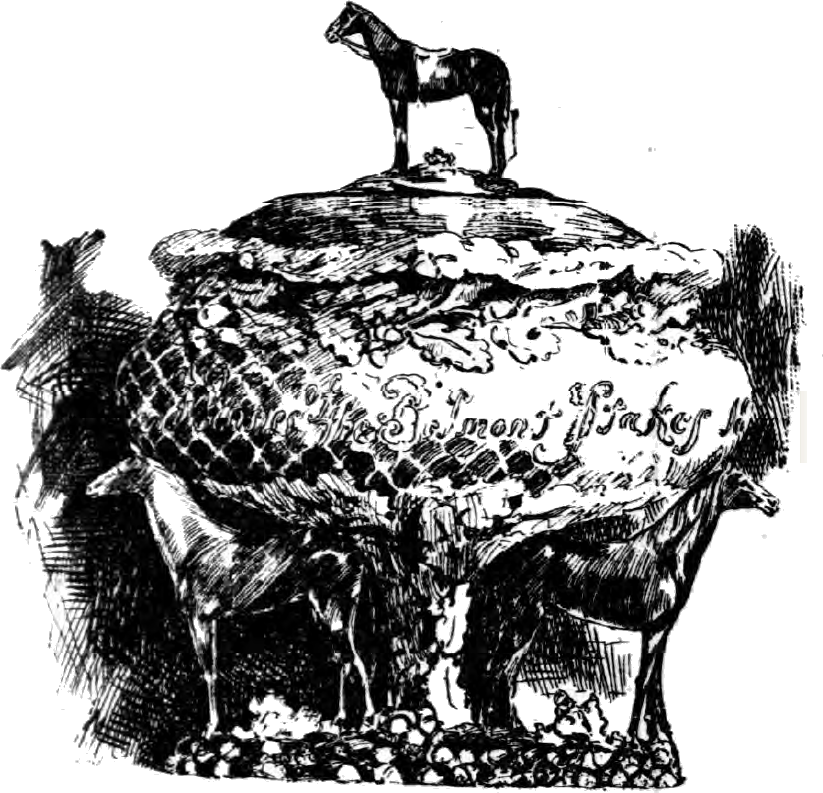
1896 newspaper drawing of the August Belmont Trophy, with Fenian on top of the cup.

Fenian won the third running of the Belmont Stakes in 1869 for his owner August Belmont. His trainer was Jacob Pincus and he won the race in a time of 3 minutes and 4.25 seconds. The track was rated as heavy, and the race was at a distance of 1 5/8 miles (i.e. 13 furlongs (2,600 metres)) on June 5. The race was worth $3500 to the winner, who was ridden by Charlie Miller. Although there is no official record of the margin of victory, contemporary accounts noted that Fenian won the race easily, and finished the race while being pulled up. The race was run at Jerome Park. His stablemate, Glenelg, was also entered in the race, and there is some indication that Glenelg was held back to allow Fenian to win. Glenelg, also owned by Belmont, came in second in the race. Fenian, however, had been bred by Belmont, and Glenelg, who was imported to the United States in his mother's womb, had not, so Belmont preferred for a horse he had bred to win. There were 6 other horses in the race, but none of them came close to beating either Fenian or Glenelg. This was Fenian's only race as a three-year-old.

Fenian reportedly never raced again, due to bad legs. This was a fault of all of his dam's foals. However, Belmont sold Fenian in October 1870 to Dr. D. Kerwin for $70. He later raced under Kerwin's name as a gelding until 1872 when he was sent to England. Retrained for steeplechasing and owned by J.B. Burstall, Fenian was second in the Military and Navy Stakes run at Emsworth in April 1872.

Fenian won no other stakes races, and sired no stakes winners. His claim to fame is that he is the horse that appears on top of the Belmont Stakes trophy.

== Pedigree ==
Pedigree of Fenian
Sire Mickey Free 1841	Birdcatcher 1833	Sir Hercules	Whalebone
Sire Mickey Free 1841	Birdcatcher 1833	Sir Hercules	Peri
Sire Mickey Free 1841	Birdcatcher 1833	Guiccioli	Bob Booty
Sire Mickey Free 1841	Birdcatcher 1833	Guiccioli	Flight
Sire Mickey Free 1841	Annie 1827	Wanderer	Gohanna
Sire Mickey Free 1841	Annie 1827	Wanderer	Catherine
Sire Mickey Free 1841	Annie 1827	Caroline	Whalebone
Sire Mickey Free 1841	Annie 1827	Caroline	Marianne
Dam Spiletta 1856	Stockwell 1849	The Baron	Birdcatcher
Dam Spiletta 1856	Stockwell 1849	The Baron	Echidna
Dam Spiletta 1856	Stockwell 1849	Pocahontas	Glencoe
Dam Spiletta 1856	Stockwell 1849	Pocahontas	Marpessa
Dam Spiletta 1856	Olivia Augusta 1851	Cowl	Bay Middleton
Dam Spiletta 1856	Olivia Augusta 1851	Cowl	Crucifix
Dam Spiletta 1856	Olivia Augusta 1851	Maria	Belshazzar
Dam Spiletta 1856	Olivia Augusta 1851	Maria	Cervantes Mare
