= Triple Crown Trophy =

Award to the winner of the U.S. Triple Crown of Thoroughbred Racing

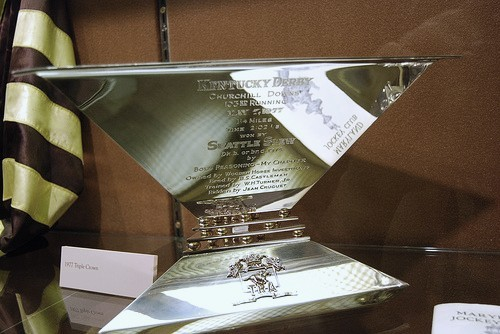
Photo of Seattle Slew's "Triple Crown Trophy" on loan during a traveling display at Pimlico Race Course

The Triple Crown Trophy is a silver trophy awarded to the winner of the United States Triple Crown of Thoroughbred Racing. The Triple Crown trophy has come to represent the pinnacle achievement in horseracing. Commissioned in 1950 by the Thoroughbred Racing Association, artisans at the world-famous Cartier Jewelry Company were charged with creating not just a trophy, but a true work of art. The result was a three-sided vase, each face equally representing the three jewels of the crown, intending to capture the spirit of horseracing's most sought after, and rarest, honor. The three sides are engraved with specific information from each of the three races; the Kentucky Derby, the Preakness Stakes and the Belmont Stakes. Upon completion of the first trophy it was awarded to the 1948 Triple Crown Winner Citation. Each year thereafter, retroactive trophies were presented to the first eight winners of the Triple Crown in reverse order until all of the previous winners or their heirs were awarded.

Today the Triple Crown Trophy is a permanent trophy awarded to the winner with information pertaining to each race engraved on corresponding sides. When not on tour during the live running of the royal trio of races, the trophy is on public display at the Kentucky Derby Museum in Louisville, Kentucky.

In addition to the Triple Crown Trophy, winners of the Kentucky Derby are given the Kentucky Derby Trophy, a solid gold trophy worth in excess of $90,000; winners of the Preakness Stakes are presented the Woodlawn Vase in a national TV ceremony and given a solid silver replica worth in excess of $30,000 for permanent possession; winners of the Belmont Stakes are presented the August Belmont Trophy and given a silver tray for their permanent possession. Only five colts have been awarded all four trophies in the same year: Secretariat (1973), Seattle Slew (1977), Affirmed (1978), American Pharaoh (2015), and Justify (2018).

== Triple Crown Trophy winners ==
Year	Winning horse
1973	Secretariat
1977	Seattle Slew
1978	Affirmed
2015	American Pharoah
2018	Justify

== See also ==
- August Belmont Trophy
- Kentucky Derby Trophy
- Triple Crown Productions
- Woodlawn Vase
