= Kentucky Oaks Trophy =

Trophy given to the Kentucky Oaks horse race winner

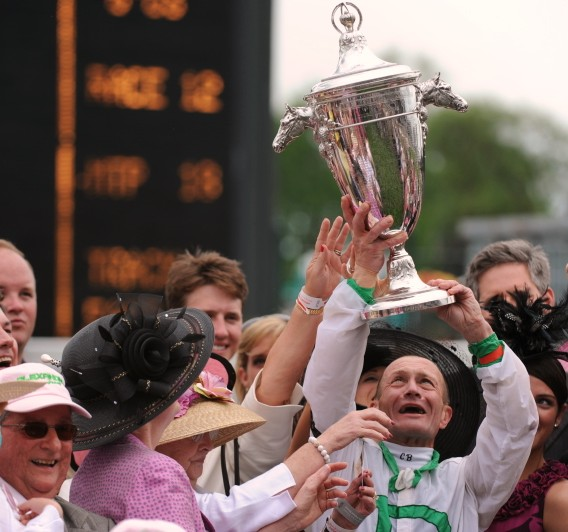
Jockey Calvin Borel holding up the perpetual Kentucky Oaks Trophy

The Kentucky Oaks Trophy is a ceremonial trophy which is presented annually to the winner of the Kentucky Oaks horse race. Since the Kentucky Oaks is run on the Friday preceding the Kentucky Derby, the trophy presentation occurs on Friday evening, the evening before the Derby (which is held on the first Saturday in May).

The trophy presentation is ceremonial only, since the trophy remains in the custody of the Kentucky Derby Museum in Louisville, Kentucky. The presentation is usually carried in prime-time television.

== History of the trophy ==
The Kentucky Oaks was first run in 1875; its winner gained a purse of $1,175, but the existing records do not mention any trophy as part of the award ceremony. In 1924 Lemon & Son, Inc. commissioned Redlich & Co. of New York City to create a loving cup, possession of which would signify having won the Kentucky Oaks competition. Redlich asked George Louis Graff to provide an appropriate design. The resulting sterling silver design was 25 inches (64 cm) tall, with horse-head handles on each side and an ornate silver horseshoe on top.

Each year the winner's name is engraved on the trophy. In 1955, Churchill Downs had all winners prior to the 1924 race also engraved on the trophy. The first winner engraved on the trophy was Princess Doreen in 1924. Her owner Harry Stutts, trainer S. Miller Henderson and breeder from the Audley Farm Stable were there for the first ceremonial presentation.

== Status of the trophy ==
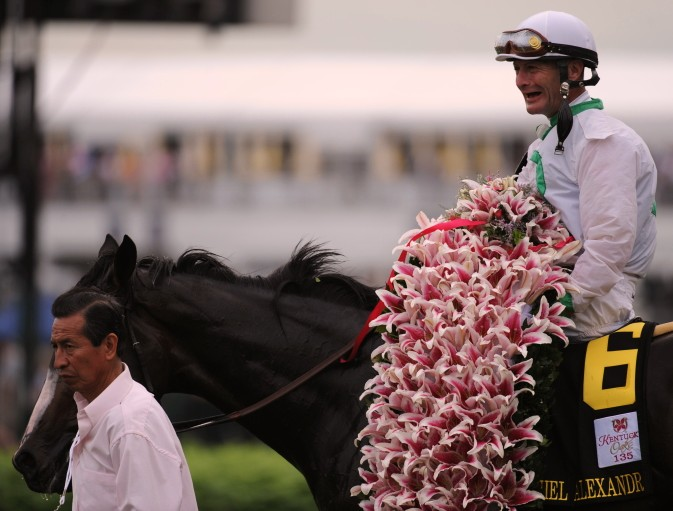
Garland of "Lillies for the Fillies" presented to Rachel Alexandra

The Kentucky Oaks trophy is held at and by the Kentucky Derby Museum in Louisville. As a permanent memento, the winning owner of the Oaks receives a set of 12 sterling silver julep cups in a satin-lined wood case. The julep cups are also engraved with the year and the names of the winning team. It is a sentimental tradition that the winning owner gifts a julep cup each to the winning trainer, winning jockey and the breeder of the horse, although there is no requirement to make the gifts.

The winner of the Kentucky Oaks is also presented with a garland of lilies draped around the filly's withers.

== See also ==
- Kentucky Derby Trophy
