= August Belmont Trophy =

Trophy awarded to the winning Belmont Stakes owner

The August Belmont Trophy is awarded annually to the winning owner of the Belmont Stakes now run at Belmont Park in Elmont, New York. The silver bowl, created by Paulding Farnham in 1896–97, was awarded to the 1896 Belmont Stakes winner upon its completion. The trophy remained with the Belmont family until 1926 when they donated it as a perpetual trophy, and since that time has been presented to the winning owner of the race for ceremonial purposes only. A silver plate is inscribed and given to the winning owner to keep.

== Belmont Trophy ==
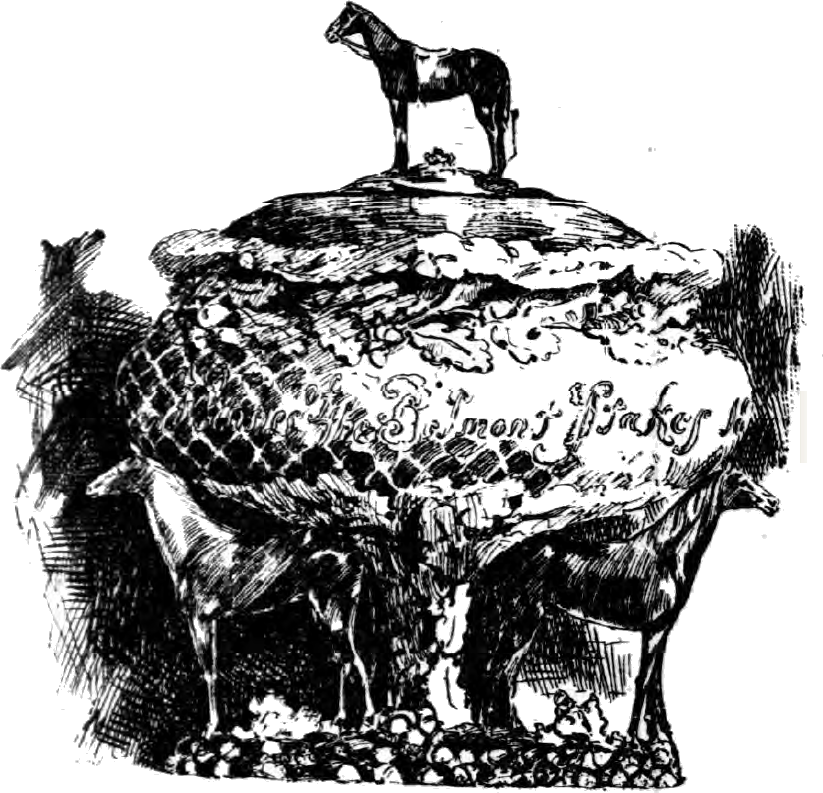
Anonymous artist's rendition of the Belmont Cup, 1896. The trophy was designed by Paulding Farnham at the behest of August Belmont Jr.

Tiffany & Co. was commissioned by August Belmont Jr. in 1896 to create a silver cup in memory of his late father August Belmont, the namesake of the Belmont Stakes, to be presented to the winner of the 1896 event. Using 350 ounces of sterling silver, Paulding Farnham crafted a 27-inch high, acorn-shaped bowl supported by a pedestal composed of three Thoroughbred horse statues representing the foundation stallions Eclipse, Matchem and Herod. The bowl was 15 inches across and 14 inches at the base and had a prominent acorn and oak motif symbolizing the development of modern racing Thoroughbreds from the three foundation sires. The lid was crowned with a statue of the elder Belmont's racehorse Fenian who secured Belmont's first win in the Belmont Stakes in 1869. Plans for the cup were unveiled on June 2, the day of the running at Morris Park Racecourse, while the cup was finished the following year in 1897. The cup cost $1,000 to create and augmented the $4,000 in prize money given to the race winner. August Belmont, Jr. himself won the Cup when Hastings won the race. Paulding Farnham made several additional Belmont Stakes trophies that were distributed from 1897 to 1907.

From 1896 until 1926, this trophy remained with the Belmont family. In 1926, Mrs. Eleanor R. Belmont, the widow of Major August Belmont II, donated the trophy to the Westchester Racing Association, then a governing body of New York racing, to be established as the permanent trophy for the race.

In a letter to Mrs. Belmont dated June 8, 1926, Westchester Racing Secretary John J. Coakley wrote: “As desired by you, the Cup will be known in the future as the August Belmont Memorial Cup and will be contested for annually in the renewal of the ‘Belmont Stakes’ at Belmont Park, the winner of each renewal to retain possession of the Cup until the succeeding year.”

== Awarded trophies ==
In addition to being presented the permanent trophy for ceremonial purposes only, the winning owner of the Belmont Stakes receives a smaller replica of the trophy to keep. The winning trainer and jockey are also presented with small replicas, while the winning groom is given a statuette to commemorate the victory.

== See also ==
- Kentucky Derby Trophy
- Woodlawn Vase
- Triple Crown Trophy
- Man o' War Cup
