= George L. Graff =

American industrial designer

George Lewis Graff (sometimes spelled George Louis Graff) was an American industrial designer active in the 1920s and 1930s.

== Kentucky Derby Trophy ==
Graff's most famous work is the Kentucky Derby Trophy first presented in 1924 (and in continuous use since).

== Work for Dura ==
From at least 1929 onwards, Graff was employed by the Dura Manufacturing Company of Ohio. Dura produced cast metal products for other manufacturers for which Graff frequently did the design work. Graff designed a series of clocks for Westclox, the LaSalle models, six different cases sharing the same clock movement were introduced in 1931 and produced until 1934. The clock movements were supplied by Westclox, while Dura made the cases; these are often referred to as Dura models.

Telechron and General Electric also made clocks using Dura cases, and Graff did a pair of designs, the 711 and AB712 that were produced for both companies from 1931-1936.

Several of Graff's designs for Dura were awarded patents; US patent number 80,619 filed in 1929 is for a latching refrigerator door handle, while three sequential patents filed in 1931, US patent numbers 85,929 thru 85,931, are for "electric candle" designs; art deco incandescent light fixtures or portable lamps styled to resemble candles. The patent applications state that Graff lived in Toledo, Ohio during this period of his career.
