= Arlington Million Trophy =

Horse racing award

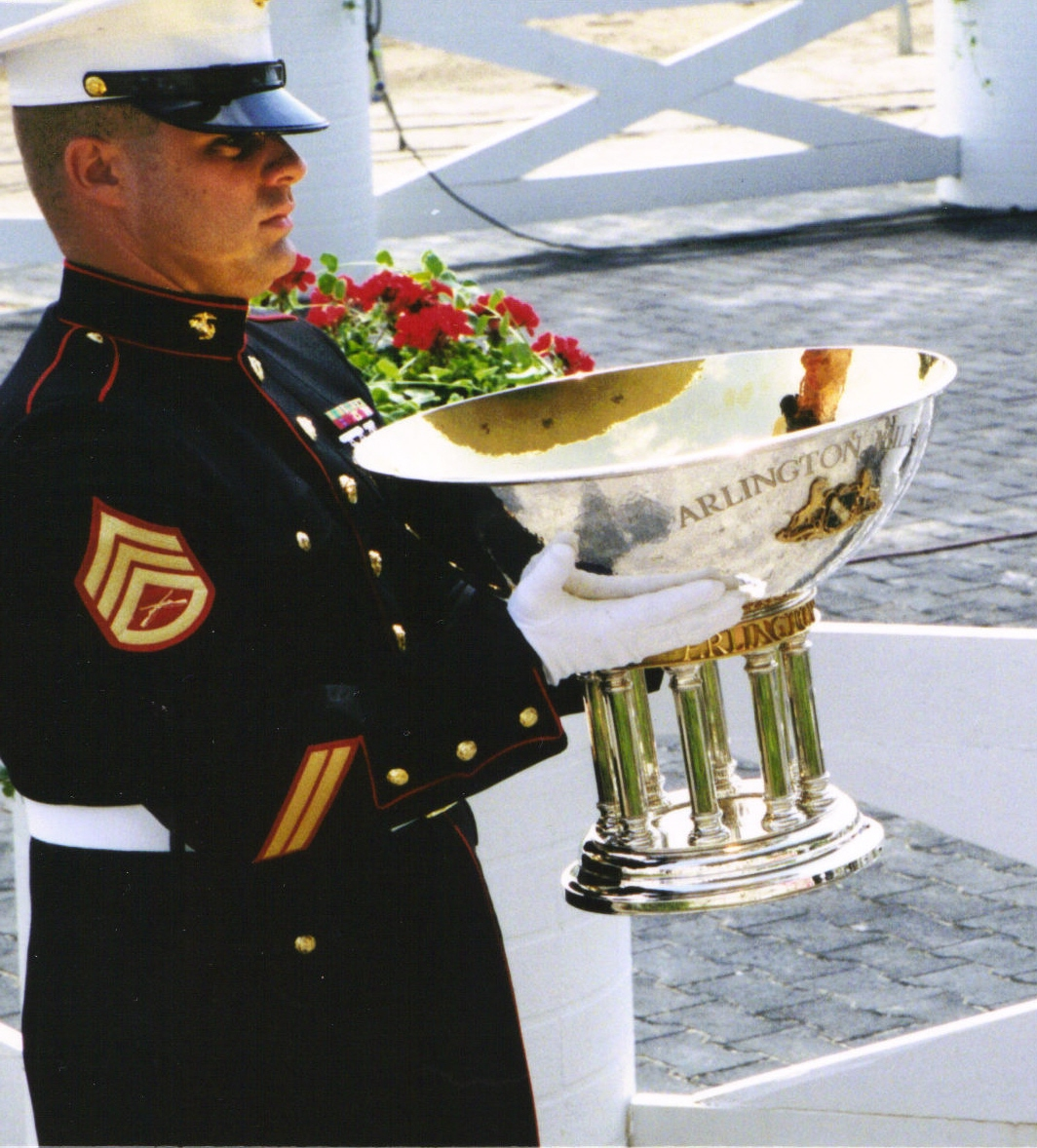
A U.S. Marine carries the perpetual "Arlington Million Trophy" to its presentation stand.

Each year the perpetual "Arlington Million Trophy" is presented to the winners of the Arlington Million in a national televised award ceremony. The Arlington Million Trophy is one that was commissioned in 1984 and stays on display at Arlington Park in Arlington Heights, Illinois, year round. Arlington Park is owned by Churchill Downs Incorporated and the parent company lists the Arlington Million as one of the country's most important races behind the Kentucky Derby and the Kentucky Oaks. The names of the horse and the connections are included in the display.

== Dimensions of the trophy ==
The trophy itself is a work of art. It is a cup (more like a bowl) that stands 24 in (610 mm) tall and 30 in (760 mm) wide at the rim of the cup. It is made of solid polished silver and 14 karat gold. The base is two platforms that make the foundation of the trophy. The bottom platform is 14 in (360 mm) at its base with another platform beveled right on top of the first. Both platforms are made of silver. The base is supporting eight 8 in (200 mm) Greek revival silver columns. Those columns are capped by another platform that is encircled by a 14 in (360 mm) gold collar that is 1 1/4 in (32 mm) tall by 1/8 in (3.2 mm) deep. Inside the collar are 1 in (25 mm) 14 karat gold letters that spell the words Arlington Million. Atop the trophy sits a huge solid silver bowl that is 12 in (300 mm) tall and 30 in (760 mm) wide. The bowl is Etched with the words Arlington Million in the shape of an arch. Inside the arch is a 3 in × 5 in (76 mm × 127 mm) 14 karat gold relief of the Arlington Park emblem with two horses and a coat of arms. In time this emblem would become the facility's logo and used on marketing pieces for the track.

== Owners, trainers and jockeys trophies ==
Although the pertpetual trophy is only used in the ceremony, a 60% solid silver only replica is given to the winning owner each year. That replica stands 18 in (460 mm) tall and is 14 in (360 mm) wide at the rim of the cup. It is supported by six Greek revival columns. The winning trainer and jockey also receive trophies but these do not resemble the perpetual trophy.

== Traditions ==
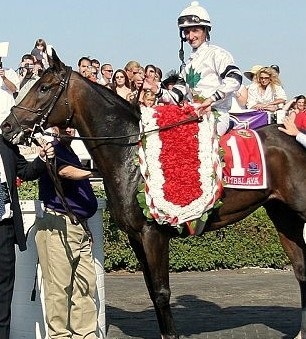
Each year a garland of "Million Dollar Flowers" are draped around the winner.

Richard Duchossois has started several traditions run in relation to the race. The first is right after the race is run, Mr. D. will pass out dozens of flutes of champagne and toast the winners just before watching the replay on the jumbotron. Then the trophies are passed out by Chairman Emeritus of Arlington Park Richard Duchossois and then interviews and commentaries are made.

Although Richard Duchossois merged Arlington Park with Churchill Downs Inc. several years ago, many people still associate the track with him. He remains actively involved at the facility and is often present in the paddock during major events such as the International Festival of Racing, the annual turf racing showcase featuring the Grade I Arlington Million. The festival regularly attracts leading horses from around the world.

== Blanket of flowers ==
Like most signature races, the Arlington Million has its version of a garland of flowers that is draped over withers of the winning horse. This blanket is unlike most prestigious grade one races because it does not have just one type of flower. The Kentucky Derby has roses, the Preakness Stakes has the black-eyed Susans, the Belmont Stakes has white carnations, the Breeders' Cup has Chrysanthemums. The Arlington Million calls their blanket their "Million Dollar Flowers". It has a Magnolia backing that is topped with a red and white peppermint striped broad-brimmed blanket. It is arranged with a field of red carnations that is 20 in (510 mm) wide surrounded by a 4 in (100 mm) trim of two white carnations representing the flowers of the Arlington Million. The entire blanket is 84 in (2,100 mm) long by 24 in (610 mm) wide.
