= Kentucky Derby Trophy =

American Thoroughbred horse racing trophy

The Kentucky Derby Trophy is a set of four trophies that are awarded to the winning connections of America's most famous race: the grade one $3,100,000 Kentucky Derby. The owner receives a gold trophy while the trainer, the jockey and the breeder win a silver half size replica of the main gold trophy. The trophy itself has been run for since the 50th running of the Kentucky Derby in 1924. Churchill Downs Race Course of Louisville, Kentucky, has annually presented a gold trophy to the winning owner of the famed "Run for the Roses."

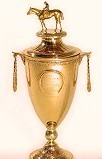
Kentucky Derby Trophy

== Early history ==
There is no record whether a trophy was presented to the winner of the first Derby in 1875. There is evidence that trophy presentations were sporadically made between 1876 and 1924. In 1924, Matt Winn, who was the president of Churchill Downs at the time commissioned a standard design from artist George L. Graff for the 1925 50th "Golden Anniversary" of the Derby.

== Design changes over time ==
Outside of the jeweled embellishments that were added to note special Derby anniversaries in 1949 (75th), 1974 (100th), and 1999 (125th), only one change has been made to the original design. For the 125th Kentucky Derby in 1999, Churchill Downs officials decided to defer to racing lore and change the direction of the decorative horseshoe.

The horseshoe, fashioned from 18-karat gold, had pointed downward on each of the trophies since 1924. To commemorate Derby 125 the change was made and the horseshoe was turned 180 degrees so that its ends pointed up. The trophy now annually incorporates the horseshoe with the ends pointing up. Racing superstition decrees that if the horseshoe is turned down all the luck will run out.

== Dimensions and manufacture ==
The trophy was supplied by Lemon & Son, a Louisville jeweller (and the oldest retail business in Louisville) from 1924 until 1999. From 1975 onwards, the trophy has been manufactured by the New England Sterling company, located in North Attleboro, Massachusetts.

The trophy, which is topped by an 18-karat gold horse and rider, includes horseshoe shaped handles, is 22 inches tall and weighs 56 ounces, excluding its jade base. Most of it is 14-karat gold; some components are 14-karat green gold.

To complete the trophy by April, construction begins during the fall of the previous year; the completed trophy takes approximately 2000 hours of labor. Typically 29 parts are combined into 19 components which comprise the trophy. Various construction techniques are used, including casting (the horse and rider that top the trophy), stamping and metal spinning.

The trophy is believed to be the only solid gold trophy that is annually awarded the winner of a major American sporting event. As of 2008, its material raw value was $90,000.

== Presentations of trophy ==
Each year there are three separate presentations of the trophy. The first presentation of the gold Kentucky Derby Trophy is when it is officially presented to Churchill Downs race course on the last Saturday of April escorted by the Kentucky Army National Guard soldiers in between races on the undercard of the Derby Trial Stakes on opening day of the spring meet each year.

The second presentation is the one that is most familiar to the public on the first Saturday of May. It is when the Governor of the Commonwealth of Kentucky and the Chairman of Churchill Downs Incorporated awards the trophies to the winning connections about ten minutes after the race is declared official on NBC network TV.

The third and final presentation of the trophies is on "Alumni Day" on the Saturday of June following the Belmont Stakes, exactly six weeks after the race. The winning owner, trainer, jockey and breeder are all invited back to receive the trophies they earned earlier but have since been engraved with precise information engraved on each award. Churchill celebrates its third largest draw at the gate when the trophies are presented on "Stephen Foster" day. That day includes two opportunities for the public to meet winning alumni of the Kentucky Derby. The first has many former winning jockeys hold an autograph session. The second has the winning connections participating in a news conference and trophy presentation in between races on the undercard of the Stephen Foster Handicap, which is a grade one race for older horses at the Derby distance of one mile and a quarter.

== Run for the Roses ==
The use of roses was first established as part of the Derby celebration when they were presented to all the ladies attending a fashionable Louisville Derby party in 1883. The roses were such a sensation that the president of Churchill Downs, Colonel Lewis Clark, adopted the rose as the race's official flower. The rose garland now synonymous with the Kentucky Derby first appeared in the 1896 when the winner, Ben Brush, received a floral arrangement of white and pink roses.

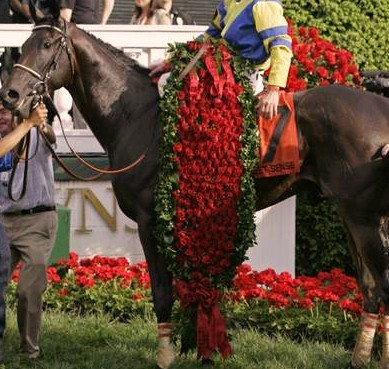
The official Garland of Roses is presented in the winner's circle after the race

In 1904 the red rose became the official flower of the Kentucky Derby. The tradition was strengthened when, in 1925, New York sports columnist Bill Corum, later the president of Churchill Downs, dubbed the Kentucky Derby the "Run for the Roses". The garland as it exists today was first introduced in 1932 for the 58th running won by Burgoo King.

== Composition and construction of Garland ==
Each year, a garland of more than 400 red roses is sewn into a green satin backing with the seal of the Commonwealth on one end and the Churchill Downs twin spires and number of the running on the other. Each garland is also adorned with a "Crown" of roses, green fern and ribbon. The "Crown," a single rose pointing upward in the center of the garland, symbolizes the struggle and heart necessary to reach the winners' circle.

Each year the Governor and other dignitaries present the winning jockey with a bouquet of 60 long stemmed roses wrapped in ten yards of ribbon.

For several years, owners of the Derby winner also received a silk replica of the garland, but since Grindstone's 1996 victory, the actual garland has made the trip to Danville, Kentucky to be freeze-dried. Some owners have even gone as far as to have a flower dipped in silver. A silver dipped flower from the garland of Gato del Sol, the 1982 winner, is on display in the Kentucky Derby Museum.

The Kroger Company has been the official florist of the Kentucky Derby since 1987. After taking over the duties from the Kingsley Walker florist, Kroger began constructing the prestigious garland in one of its local stores for the public to view on Derby Eve. The preservation of the garland and crowds of spectators watching its construction are a testament to the prestige and mystique of the Garland of Roses.

== See also ==
- Kentucky Oaks Trophy
- Woodlawn Vase
- August Belmont Trophy
- Triple Crown Trophy
