= Woodlawn Vase =

Thoroughbred horse race trophy

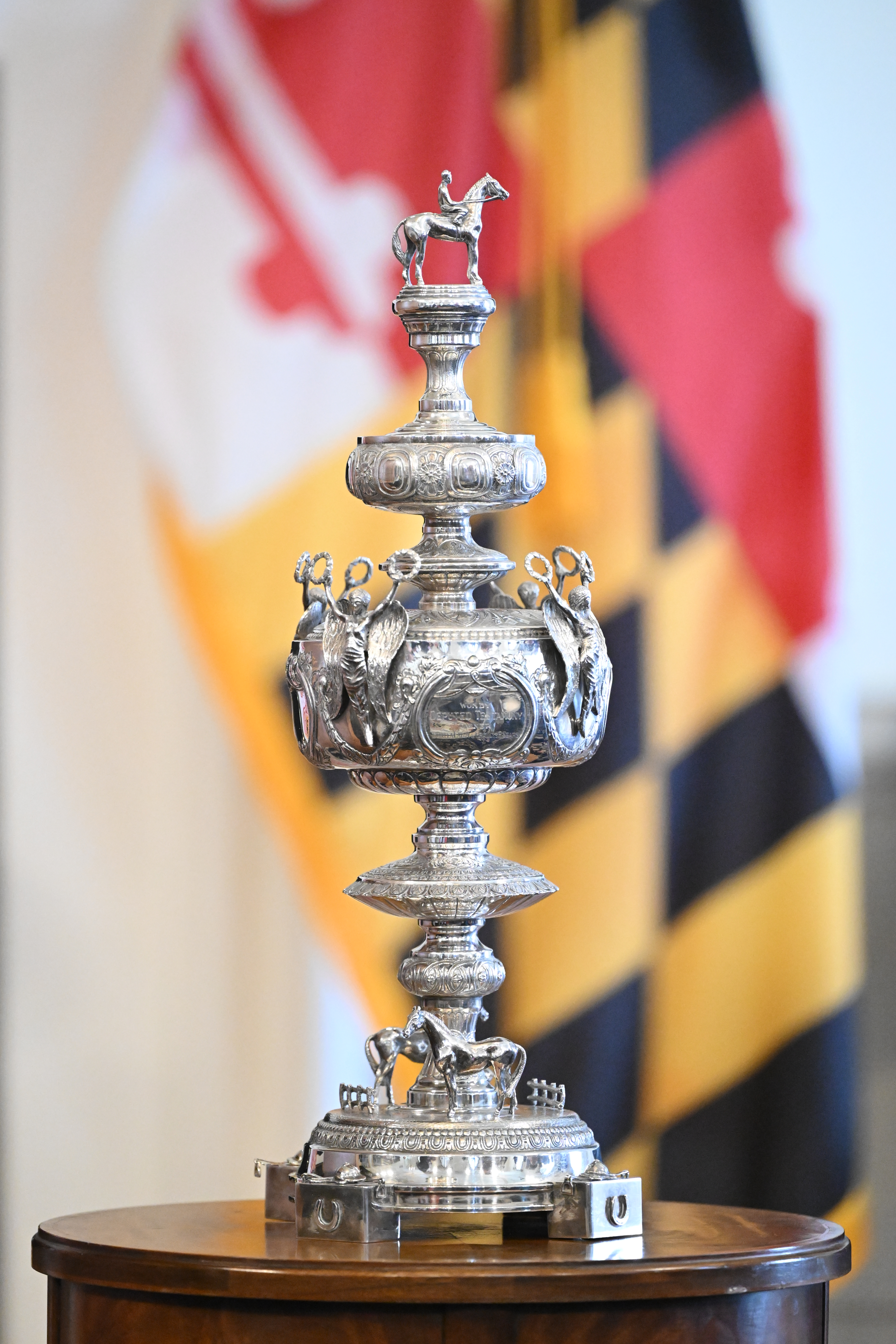
The Woodlawn Vase on display during an August 2026 press conference at Government House

The Woodlawn Vase is a thoroughbred horse race trophy given annually to the winning owner of the Preakness Stakes, an American stakes race at Pimlico Race Course in Baltimore, Maryland.

== Overview of the trophy ==
After the Preakness Stakes is run each year on the third Saturday of May, the winners are awarded the Woodlawn Vase on national television. The vase was first awarded in 1861 to a stakes-winning mare named Mollie Jackson in Louisville, Kentucky. In 1917, the Woodlawn Vase became the official trophy for the winner of the second jewel of the Triple Crown and was awarded to the Preakness winner Kalitan. For many years the trophy was given to the winning owner to keep for one year until the next running of the race. In 1953, Native Dancer won the Preakness Stakes and the wife of winning owner Alfred Gwynne Vanderbilt Jr. (Jeanne Murray Vanderbilt) declined to take annual possession of the trophy because of its monetary and sentimental value to the sport. Following 1953, the winning owner of the horse that won The Preakness Stakes was no longer allowed to keep the trophy for the year. In 1983, the trophy's silver design was appraised by Tiffany & Co. (the original creator in 1860) as priceless but a figure of $1,000,000 was established for insurance purposes. The appraised value is now reported to exceed $4,000,000.00 in replacement value. The original trophy is kept at the Baltimore Museum of Art in Maryland and brought to the Preakness Stakes each year escorted by Maryland Army National Guard Soldiers and Air National Guard Airmen in their dress uniforms donning white gloves for proper care during transportation to the "Old Hilltop's" cupola winner's circle for the presentation ceremony.

== Dimensions and description of the vase ==
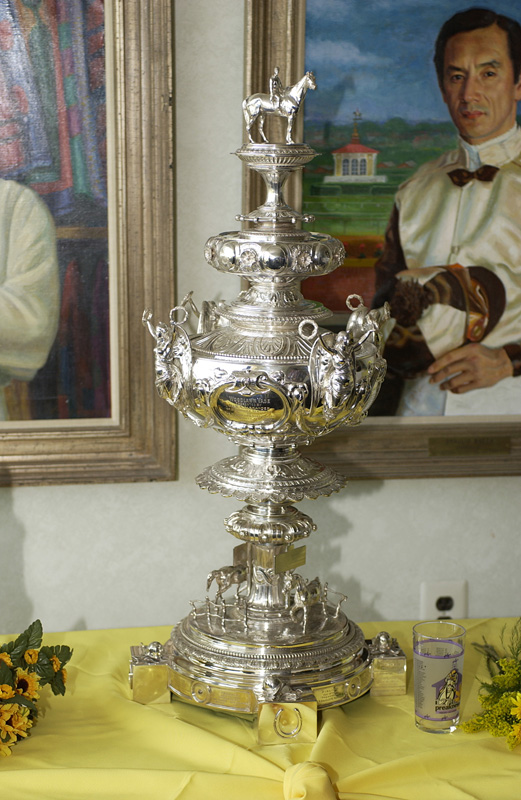
The Woodlawn Vase on display before The Preakness Stakes in 2002, note a Black-eyed Susan glass is set in photo to give a size comparison

Standing 36 inches tall and weighing 400 ounces of solid sterling silver (approx. 30 pounds), the Woodlawn vase has a colorful history as rich as the classic race at which it is presented. The following is an excerpt from Wilkes B. Spirit of "The Times, The American Gentleman's Newspaper" in 1860: "Messrs. Tiffany & Co., the celebrated jewelers, on Tuesday last, sent to Louisville, KY a massive silver vase, for the Woodlawn Race Course Association, the most elegant of its kind ever made anywhere in the world. Its entire height is 36 inches, its weight is four hundred ounces, and its value $1,500. The base of this piece is a circle thirteen inches in diameter, supported upon a cross, then four projections of which are faced each with a race shoe; and on the top of each projection is a racing saddle, whip, jockey cap, etc. The upper part of the base represents a lawn, divided into fields by a rustic fence. In one field is seen a stallion and in the other a mare and foal. On either side of the pillar is a bulletin, on which the rules to be observed in contending for the prize are distinctly engraved. The centerpiece, or bowl, is fourteen inches above the base, and fourteen inches in diameter, and has four shields. On one of these is engraved the picture of a race horse, on another a representation of the Woodlawn Race Course, on another is a blank for the history of the winning of the prize, and the other also blank for a portrait of the winner. Between the shields are four figures of Victory, in frosted silver, each holding a wreath in either hand. Seven inches above the bowl is a circular ornament nine inches in diameter, having engraved on it the portraits of eight officers of the Woodlawn Race Course Association. The whole is surmounted by a full figure of the horse "Lexington" mounted by a jockey in costume.

== History of the vase ==
It has been raced for in Louisville, Kentucky, Elizabeth, New Jersey, the Sheepshead Bay Race Track, New York, Jerome Park Racetrack, New York, Morris Park Racecourse, New York, and continuously since 1917, at Pimlico Race Course in Baltimore, Maryland. Created as a challenge cup, the Woodlawn Vase was first won by Capt. Thomas G. Moore's mare, Mollie Jackson, in 1861. This excerpt appeared in the newspaper that week, "The rules under which this prize is to be contended for are such that a man who wins it on the first trial (which is to occur on Saturday, the 18th instant of the year) is to give bonds to produce the Vase for future trials; and no one is entitled to it without giving such bonds, until he has won it three successive times. The challengers for the Vase, who name their horses to the post will be listed in the paper and the result reported for perpetuity in time in our next paper." The same owner retained possession the following year through the victory of the famous mare "Idlewild." The outbreak of the Civil War prevented further competition until 1866.

Following the war, the vase remained in Kentucky for 13 years until 1878, when the Dwyer Brothers Stable captured it by the aid of their colt "Bramble" and trainer Jim McLaughlin in the American Stallion Stakes at Churchill Downs, in Louisville, Kentucky. The Dwyer Brothers presented the vase to the Coney Island Jockey Club, where notable stables of the day competed vigorously for the vase for the next 25 years.

The first running at Morris Park Racecourse took place on October 26, 1901. It was won by Gold Heels, whose trainer, Matthew Allen, had been part of the training staff at Louisville, Kentucky for 1861 winner, Mollie Jackson.

Thomas C. Clyde, owner of Goughacres Stable, won possession through the double victory of his homebred colt "Shorthose" in 1903 and 1904. "Shorthose" was the only horse - with the exception of the wonderful Miss Woodford - to win it twice. In 1917, Mr. Clyde presented the vase to the Maryland Jockey Club, of which he was a director. It was added to the Preakness that year, though Clyde proposed a condition - the winning owner should keep the vase for the year, and have the privilege of naming the course and the stake for its renewal. Edward R. Bradley's Kalitan was the first winner of the vase at Pimlico.

The vase was presented to the winning Preakness owner each year from 1873 to 1889 and from 1917 to 1953 – although the latter part of Clyde's condition did not prevail. In 1953, when Alfred Gwynne Vanderbilt Jr.'s Native Dancer won the trophy and proclaimed, "Due to the historic value of the legendary trophy and Mrs. Vanderbilt preference not to accept responsibility for the vase's safekeeping until the next year's Preakness," that the trophy be permanently kept and protected by the Maryland Jockey Club.

== Owner, trainer and jockey replicas ==
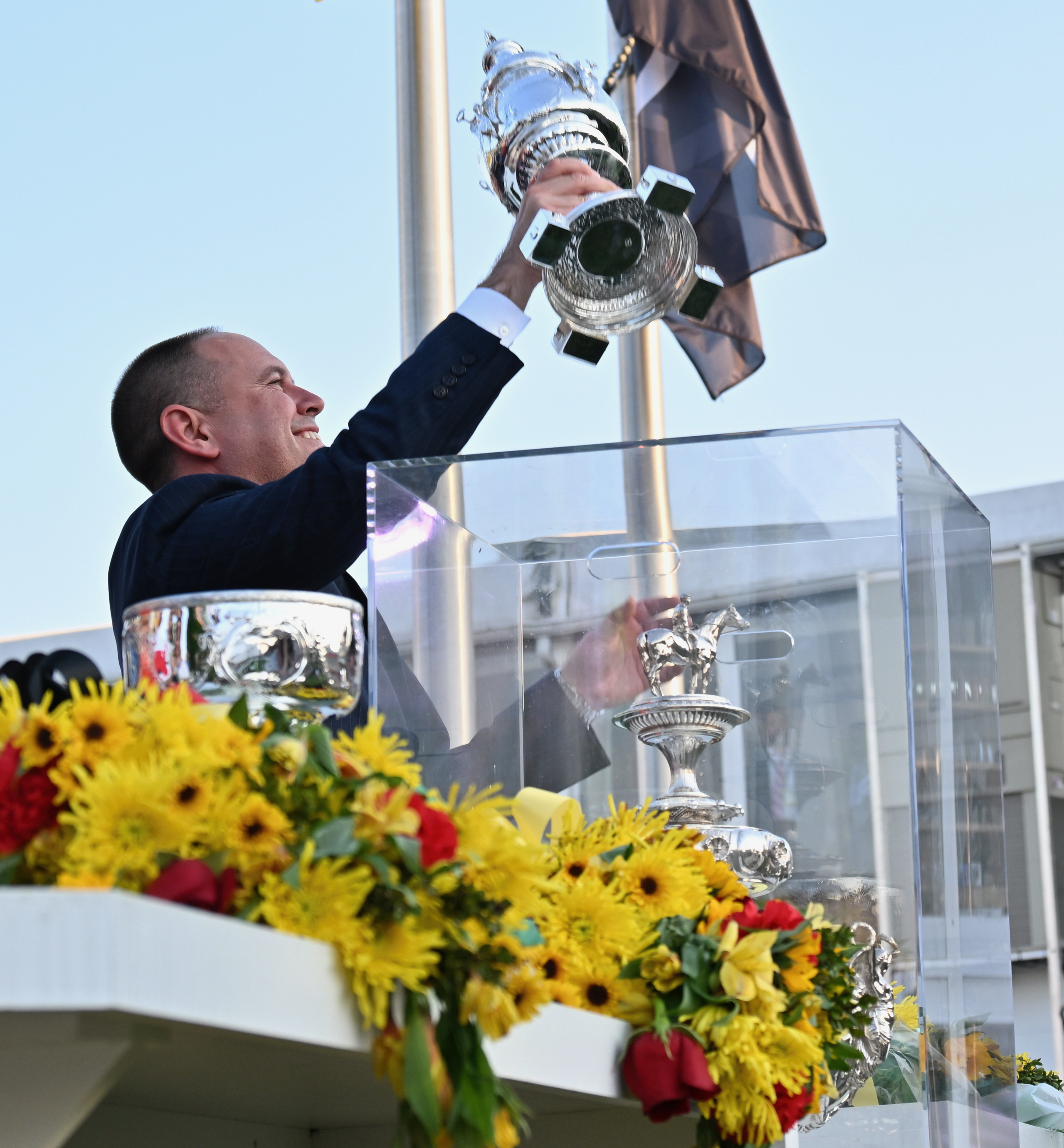
Chad Brown holding the Woodlawn Vase replica trophy, with the original Woodlawn Vase partially visible

Eventually, a one-third-size (35% of scale) solid sterling silver reproduction of the trophy valued at $40,000 is given annually to the winning owner to keep permanently. It is made each year at a height of 14 inches with twelve pounds of silver, composed of fourteen large parts and 36 little parts all intricately crafted together. The winning trainer and jockey are given solid sterling silver cups that look similar to the trophy valued at $15,000 each standing at a foot tall. The smaller solid sterling silver replica requires sixteen weeks work of one of the nation's most skilled silversmiths, Kirk Stieff. It is awarded to the winning owner of the Preakness Stakes on a permanent basis. The perpetual trophy is now on display at The Baltimore Museum of Art under the direction of The Maryland Historical Society and is brought to Pimlico Race Course under guard by Maryland National Guard and Air National Airman in dress uniform for the annual running of the Preakness.

== Original home ==
This is text from a Kentucky Historical Marker near the former site of the track:

Woodlawn Race Course – Opened in 1859 and drew national attention. Closed after Civil War. R. A. Alexander, noted breeder, was major figure in buying estate for National Racing Association. He contracted with Tiffany's to design Woodlawn Vase in 1860 and first used in 1861 and 1862. It was buried for safety during the Civil War. The Vase is now winner's trophy at the Preakness Stakes, where a replica is given each year.

== See also ==
- Kentucky Derby Trophy
- August Belmont Trophy
- Triple Crown Trophy
