= 1953 Kentucky Derby =

Horse race

79th Kentucky Derby
- Kentucky Derby
- Grade I stakes race
- Location: Churchill Downs
- Date: May 2, 1953
- Winning horse: Dark Star
- Jockey: Henry Moreno
- Trainer: Eddie Hayward
- Owner: Cain Hoy Stable
- Surface: Dirt

The 1953 Kentucky Derby was the 79th running of the Kentucky Derby. The race took place on May 2, 1953.

== Full results ==
Finished	Post	Horse	Jockey	Trainer	Owner	Time / behind
1st	10	Dark Star	Henry Moreno	Eddie Hayward	Cain Hoy Stable	
2nd	1	Native Dancer	Eric Guerin	Bill Winfrey	Alfred Gwynne Vanderbilt Jr.	
3rd	5	Invigorator	Bill Shoemaker	Norman R. Mcleod	Saxon Stable	
4th	11	Royal Bay Gem	Jimmy Combest	Clyde Troutt	Eugene Constantin, Jr.	
5th	3	Correspondent	Eddie Arcaro	T. Wallace Dunn	Mrs. Gordon Guiberson	
6th	9	Straight Face	Ted Atkinson	John M. Gaver, Sr.	Greentree Stable	
7th	1a	Social Outcast	John H. Adams	Bill Winfrey	Alfred Gwynne Vanderbilt Jr.	
8th	8	Money Broker	Alfred Popara	Vester R. Wright	G. & G. Stable	
9th	4	Ram O' War	Douglas Dodson	Jerome J. Sarner, Jr.	Bruce S. Campbell	
10th	7	Curragh King	David Erb	James Wallace	Edwar M. Goemans	
11th	2	Ace Destroyer	Job Dean Jessop	Louis Finley	Mr. & Mrs. Tom M. Daniel	
