= Roamer Handicap =

American thoroughbred horse race, Queens, New York

- Class: Discontinued stakes
- Location: Aqueduct Racetrack, Queens, New York, United States
- Inaugurated: 1944–1986
- Race type: Thoroughbred – Flat racing
- Website: www.nyra.com/aqueduct/

Race information
- Distance: 1 3/16 miles (1,900 metres, 9.5 furlongs)
- Surface: Dirt
- Track: left-handed
- Qualification: Three years old

The Roamer Handicap was an American Thoroughbred horse race held at Aqueduct Racetrack in Queens, New York. It was open to three-year-old horses of either sex and contested on dirt over a distance of 9.5 furlongs (1 3/16 miles / 1,900 metres). Run forty-three times, the first ten editions were held between 1944 and 1958 at Jamaica Race Course in Jamaica, Queens, New York.

== Historical notes ==
The inaugural running took place on April 11, 1944 and was run at a distance of 1 1/16 miles for the only time in its history. The race would see Lillian Christopher's Grey Wing defeat Stymie, a future U.S. Racing Hall of Fame inductee owned by Ethel Jacobs.

The filly Bridal Flower not only "beat the boys" in winning the 1946 Roamer Handicap, she beat the reigning U.S. Triple Crown Champion Assault.

The 1952 running saw Canadian jockey Hedley Woodhouse aboard 10-1 Quiet Step upset future Hall of Fame inductee Tom Fool who was also ridden by a Canadian, Ted Atkinson.

In 1960, Elizabeth Lunn's Divine Comedy won the race by 8 lengths and set a new Aqueduct track record with a time of 1:55 4/5. Seven years later, 1967 Kentucky Derby winner Proud Clarion broke that record by 4/5 of a second with a time of 1:55 flat.

Sherluck's win in the 1961 Roamer Handicap followed an earlier victory in the Belmont Stakes that ended Carry Back's chance to win the U.S. Triple Crown.

Forego won the 1973 edition of the Roamer Handicap in stakes record time while carrying highweight. He beat runner-up My Gallant by five lengths with Twice A Prince in third another 2½ lengths back. The Roamer Handicap marked Forego's first stakes race win of what would become a career ranked among the best in U.S racing history. Owned by Martha Gerry, Forego earned eight Eclipse Awards, including three American Horse of the Year titles, and would be inducted into the U.S Racing Hall of Fame.

The final running took place on December 26, 1986 and was won by Betty M. Peters' Scrimshaw.

== Records ==
Speed record:

- 1:54.60 @ 13/16 – Forego (1973)

Most wins by a jockey:

- 4 – Ángel Cordero Jr. (1968, 1974, 1981, 1984)

Most wins by a trainer:

- 2 – Kay Erik Jensen (1952, 1958)
- 2 – Laz Barrera (1971, 1974)

Most wins by an owner:

- 2 – Darby Dan Farm (1967, 1972)

== Winners ==
| Year | Winner | Age | Jockey | Trainer | Owner | Dist. (Miles) | Time | Win$ | Gr. |
|---|---|---|---|---|---|---|---|---|---|
| 1986 | Scrimshaw | 3 | Eddie Maple | Larry A. Kelly | Betty M. Peters | 13/16 | 1:55.40 | $44,700 | Listed |
| 1985 | Taj Alriyadh | 3 | Jorge Velásquez | D. Wayne Lukas | Ahmed Salman | 13/16 | 1:58.80 | $39,180 | Listed |
| 1984 | Fight Over | 3 | Ángel Cordero Jr. | John Parisella | Theodore M. Sabarese | 13/16 | 1:59.40 | $55,260 | Listed |
| 1983 | Megaturn | 3 | Kenny Skinner | Richard Nieminski | John H. Peace | 13/16 | 1:59.00 | $33,240 | Gr. 3 |
| 1982 | Dew Line | 3 | Eddie Maple | Joseph B. Cantey | Ryehill Farm | 13/16 | 1:59.00 | $34,800 | Gr. 3 |
| 1981 | Thirty Eight Paces | 3 | Ángel Cordero Jr. | King T. Leatherbury | Double Paces Stable | 13/16 | 1:56.00 | $33,600 | Gr. 3 |
| 1980 | Bar Dexter | 3 | Jean-Luc Samyn | Louis Mondello | Woodside Stud | 13/16 | 1:56.20 | $34,260 | Gr. 2 |
| 1979 | Rivalero | 3 | Jeffrey Fell | John M. Veitch | Calumet Farm | 13/16 | 1:58.60 | $32,700 | Gr. 2 |
| 1978 | Silent Cal | 3 | Doug Thomas | Benjamin W. Perkins Sr. | Mrs. Arnold A. Willcox | 13/16 | 1:56.80 | $31,710 | Gr. 2 |
| 1977 | Soldier's Lark | 3 | Mike Venezia | Victor J. Nickerson | Philip Wise | 13/16 | 1:59.20 | $32,010 | Gr. 2 |
| 1976 | Turn and Count | 3 | Jacinto Vásquez | Pancho Martin | Sigmund Sommer | 13/16 | 1:56.60 | $32,220 | Gr. 2 |
| 1975 | General Beauregard | 3 | Mike Venezia | William F. Schmitt | Brazil Stable | 13/16 | 1:54.80 | $32,640 | Gr. 2 |
| 1974 | Green Gambados | 3 | Ángel Cordero Jr. | Laz Barrera | Harbor View Farm | 13/16 | 1:55.60 | $33,600 | Gr. 2 |
| 1973 | Forego | 3 | Heliodoro Gustines | Eddie Hayward | Lazy F Ranch | 13/16 | 1:54.60 | $34,080 | Gr. 2 |
| 1972 | True Knight | 3 | Eddie Belmonte | Lou Rondinello | Darby Dan Farm | 13/16 | 1:55.40 | $34,860 | |
| 1971 | Tinajero | 3 | Eddie Belmonte | Laz Barrera | Rafael Escudero | 13/16 | 1:56.40 | $33,540 | |
| 1970 | Protanto | 3 | Chuck Baltazar | MacKenzie Miller | Cragwood Stables | 13/16 | 1:55.20 | $37.830 | |
| 1969 | Ship Leave | 3 | John L. Rotz | Angel Penna Sr. | Gustave Ring | 13/16 | 1:54.80 | $36,660 | |
| 1968 | Funny Fellow | 3 | Ángel Cordero Jr. | Edward A. Neloy | Wheatley Stable | 13/16 | 1:55.60 | $36,855 | |
| 1967 | Proud Clarion | 3 | Braulio Baeza | Loyd Gentry Jr. | Darby Dan Farm | 13/16 | 1:55.00 | $36,595 | |
| 1966 | Mr. Right | 3 | Bobby Ussery | Evan S. Jackson | Cheray Duchin | 13/16 | 1:57.60 | $38,350 | |
| 1965 | Terry's Secret | 3 | Alex Maese | Carl A. Roles | Poltex Stable | 13/16 | 1:56.40 | $37,750 | |
| 1964 | Point du Jour | 3 | Jimmy Combest | Nick Combest | Edith Baily Dent | 13/16 | 1:56.60 | $36,140 | |
| 1963 | Dean Carl | 3 | Bobby Ussery | Paul Bongarzone | Paul Bongarzone | 13/16 | 1:57.60 | $37,245 | |
| 1962 | Dead Ahead | 3 | Avelino Gomez | Woody Stephens | Cain Hoy Stable | 13/16 | 1:56.80 | $37,245 | |
| 1961 | Sherluck | 3 | Bill Shoemaker | Harold Young | Jacob Sher | 13/16 | 1:56.80 | $36,530 | |
| 1960 | Divine Comedy | 3 | Bill Shoemaker | Charles E. Whittingham | Elizabeth Lunn | 13/16 | 1:55.80 | $36,190 | |
| 1959 | Polylad | 3 | Eldon Nelson | James B. Rowe | Mrs. Q. A. Shaw McKean | 13/16 | 1:57.60 | $36,645 | |
| 1958 | Warhead | 3 | Eddie Arcaro | Kay Erik Jensen | Mabel C. Schiltz | 13/16 | 1:56.80 | $56,675 | |
| 1957 | Promised Land | 3 | Ismael Valenzuela | Hirsch Jacobs | Ethel D. Jacobs | 13/16 | 1:55.60 | $37,500 | |
| 1956 | Third Brother | 3 | Angel Valenzuela | Casey Hayes | Christopher Chenery | 13/16 | 1:56.40 | $40,700 | |
| 1955 | Sailor II | 3 | Hedley Woodhouse | Preston M. Burch | Brookmeade Stable | 13/16 | 1:56.00 | $40,500 | |
| 1954 | Jet Action | 3 | Bill Hartack | Isaac K. Mourar | Maine Chance Farm | 13/16 | 1:57.20 | $40,100 | |
| 1953 | Race not held | | | | | | | | |
| 1952 | Quiet Step | 3 | Hedley Woodhouse | Kay Erik Jensen | Apheim Stable (Bernard H. Heiman) | 13/16 | 1:55.80 | $32,600 | |
| 1948 | – 1951 | Race not held | | | | | | | |
| 1947 | Cosmic Bomb | 3 | Ovie Scurlock | William M. Booth | William G. Helis Sr. | 13/16 | 1:58.20 | $21,500 | |
| 1946 | Bridal Flower | 3 | Abelarado DeLara | James W. Smith | John R. Bradley | 13/16 | 1:57.40 | $22,700 | |
| 1945 | Chief Barker | 3 | Eric Guerin | Patrick F. Dwyer | Ben F. Whitaker | 13/16 | 1:58.20 | $19,750 | |
| 1944 | Grey Wing | 3 | Charles Wahler | Harris B. Brown | Lillian Christopher | 11/16 | 1:45.00 | $3,275 | |
