= Pat Day Mile Stakes =

Thoroughbred horse race in the United States

- Class: Grade II
- Location: Churchill Downs; Louisville, Kentucky, United States
- Inaugurated: 1924 (as the Derby Trial Stakes)
- Race type: Thoroughbred - Flat racing
- Sponsor: SAP (2025)
- Website: www.churchilldowns.com

Race information
- Distance: 1 mile
- Surface: Dirt
- Track: left-handed
- Qualification: three-year-olds
- Weight: 122 lbs with allowances
- Purse: US$750,000 (2026)

The Pat Day Mile Stakes is a Grade II American Thoroughbred horse race for three-year-olds held on dirt over a distance of one mile scheduled on Kentucky Derby Day at Churchill Downs in Louisville, Kentucky. The current purse is $750,000.

== History ==
=== Race name ===
Originally, the event was known as the Derby Trial Stakes and was held one week before the Kentucky Derby. It was first run in 1924 and every year since, with the exception of 1928.

The race name was given similar to races in Britain which preceded the Epsom Derby such as the Investec Derby Trial (now Blue Riband Trial Stakes) and Lingfield Derby Trial and in Australia, the Geelong Derby Trial Stakes (now known as the Geelong Classic).

In 2015, this race was renamed to the Pat Day Mile Stakes (in honor of the Hall of Fame jockey, Pat Day) and moved to the undercard of Kentucky Derby day. Its purse was increased from $150,000 to $200,000. In 2016, the purse was raised to $250,000.

From 2010 through 2012, it had been named the Cliff's Edge Derby Trial.

=== Distance and class ===
The distance was reduced between 1977 and 1981 to 7 furlongs. And once again the distance from 2007 to 2009 was 7 1/2 furlongs. The Derby Trial Stakes was an ungraded event from 2006 to 2008.

=== Winners of the Trial and Derby ===
Four trainers have won the Derby Trial and the Kentucky Derby with the same horse. The feat was accomplished by Hanley Webb in 1924 with Black Gold and by Ben A. Jones who did it twice, first with the great Citation in 1948 and then with Hill Gail in 1952. Eddie Hayward won both in 1953 with Dark Star and in 1958 Jimmy Jones, son of Ben, became the fourth and last to do it when he won the two races with Tim Tam. Since Tim Tam, the gradual trend in training has been toward giving Derby contenders fewer prep races and more time between them. This practice has all but eliminated the Trial as a legitimate Derby prep race. Even the 1982 decision to move it from the Tuesday before the Derby to the Saturday before didn't help.

However, the three weeks between the Trial and the 1 3/16ths-mile Preakness in Baltimore is perfect. In recent years, the Trial has sent the Preakness such horses as Key to the Mint (1972), No More Flowers (1987), Houston (1989), Honor Grades (1991), Alydeed (1992), Cherokee Run (1993), Numerous (1994), Our Gatsby (1995), Black Cash (1998), Patience Game (1999), Sir Shackleton (2004), Flying First Class (2007), Macho Again (2008), and Pleasant Prince (2010).

Although none of those Trial horses won the Preakness, Alydeed, Cherokee Run and Macho Again finished second at Pimlico Race Course and Key to the Mint finished third. And two of trainer Woody Stephens' Trial winners Caveat in 1983 and Creme Fraiche in '85 went on to win the Belmont Stakes (GI). Additionally, the 2008 Belmont Stakes was won by Da'Tara, trained by Nick Zito, who finished in fifth place in the 2008 Derby Trial Stakes.

Calumet Farm had three horses that finished second in the Trial. In 1941, Whirlaway finished second to Blue Pair in the Trial, but then roared back to win the Triple Crown. In 1949, Ponder was second to Olympia in the Trial, but came back five days later to take the Derby by three lengths over Capot.

In 1957, Middleground finished second in the Trial to Black George on a muddy track, but won the Kentucky Derby later on a fast track.

And then there was the ill-fated Gen. Duke in 1957. He came to Churchill Downs touted as a potential superstar, but finished second to Federal Hill in the Trial. Then, the morning of the Derby, Gen. Duke was scratched because of a foot injury suffered in the Trial.

In 1967, Barb's Delight became the last Trial horse to have a significant impact on the Derby, finishing second by a length to longshot Proud Clarion. Don't Get Mad finished fourth in the Derby in 2005.

The last horse to win the Saturday before the Derby and then win the roses was Cannonade in 1974. But the race he won was the now-defunct 7f Stepping Stone Purse, not the Derby Trial.

=== Losers of the Trial and winners of the Derby ===
Several Kentucky Derby winners failed to win the Trial, but bounced back to win the "Run for the Roses." Most notable of those were Calumet Farm's Iron Liege, who finished fifth in the Trial and returned to defeat a Kentucky Derby field that included champions Gallant Man, Round Table and Bold Ruler and is generally considered to be the greatest field in Derby history. King Ranch's Assault finished fourth in the Trial, but returned to win the Derby and sweep the Triple Crown. In 1941, Triple Crown winner Whirlaway finished second in the Derby Trial, but returned to sweep the Derby, Preakness Stakes and Belmont Stakes.

== Records ==
Speed record

- 1:28.45 - Macho Again (2008) (at distance of 7 1/2 furlongs)
- 1:33.87 - Crude Velocity (2026) (at distance of one mile)

Most wins by a jockey

- 4 - Eddie Arcaro (1948, 1949, 1952, 1959)
- 4 - Pat Day (1987, 1991, 1993, 2000)

Most wins by a trainer

- 5 - Ben A. Jones (1943, 1947, 1948, 1951, 1952)

Most wins by an owner

- 9 - Calumet Farm (1943, 1947, 1948, 1951, 1952, 1956, 1958, 2017, 2018)

== Winners ==
Year	Winner	Jockey	Trainer	Owner	Dist. (Miles) / (Furlongs)	Time	Purse	Gr.
2026	Crude Velocity	Florent Geroux	Bob Baffert	CSLR Racing Partners	1 mile	1:33.87	$741,330	II
2025	Macho Music	Javier Castellano	Rohan Crichton	Mark F. Taylor, Rohan Crichton & Daniel L. Walters	1 mile	1:35.65	$539,500	II
2024	Seize the Grey	Jaime Torres	D. Wayne Lukas	MyRacehorse	1 mile	1:35.96	$594,710	II
2023	General Jim	Luis Saez	Claude R. McGaughey III	Courtlandt Farms	1 mile	1:34.43	$500,000	II
2022	Jack Christopher	José Ortiz	Chad C. Brown	White Birch Farm, Jim Bakke, Gerry Isbister Gerald Isbister	1 mile	1:34.81	$500,000	II
2021	Jackie's Warrior	Joel Rosario	Steven M. Asmussen	J. Kirk Robison and Judy Robison	1 mile	1:34.39	$500,000	II
2020	Rushie	Javier Castellano	Michael W. McCarthy	Jim Daniell & Donna Daniell	1 mile	1:34.41	$500,000	II
2019	Mr. Money	Gabriel Saez	W. Bret Calhoun	Allied Racing Stable (Chester Thomas)	1 mile	1:35.21	$400,000	III
2018	Funny Duck	Brian Hernandez Jr.	George R. Arnold II	Calumet Farm	1 mile	1:37.16	$300,000	III
2017	Wild Shot	Corey Lanerie	George R. Arnold II	Calumet Farm	1 mile	1:35.58	$250,000	III
2016	Sharp Azteca	Edgard J. Zayas	Jorge Navarro	Gelfenstein Farm	1 mile	1:34.37	$250,000	III
2015	Competitive Edge	John R. Velazquez	Todd A. Pletcher	Favreau Psoinos/Tabor	1 mile	1:34.18	$200,000	III
2014	Embellishing Bob	Brian Hernandez Jr.	Steve Margolis	Martin L. Cherry	1 mile	1:36.73	$150,000	III
2013	Forty Tales	Joel Rosario	Todd A. Pletcher	Perretti Racing Stable	1 mile	1:35.77	$231,400	III
2012	Hierro	Julien Leparoux	Steven M. Asmussen	Stonestreet Stables	1 mile	1:35.27	$231,400	III
2011	Machen	Edgar Prado	Neil Howard	Courtlandt Farm	1 mile	1:35.47	$231,400	III
2010	Hurricane Ike	Calvin Borel	John W. Sadler	Ike & Dawn Thrash	1 mile	1:36.35	$200,000	III
2009	Hull	Miguel Mena	Dale L. Romans	Heiligbrodt Racing Stable	7 1/2 fur.	1:30.21	$112,000	III
2008	Macho Again	Julien Leparoux	Dallas Stewart	West Point Thoroughbreds	7 1/2 fur.	1:28.45	$115,200	
2007	Flying First Class	Mark Guidry	D. Wayne Lukas	Ellwood W. Johnston	7 1/2 fur.	1:29.28	$117,800	
2006	Record	Rafael Bejarano	Bob Baffert	Sunset Stables	1 mile	1:36.32	$114,939	
2005	Don't Get Mad	Gary Stevens	Ronald W. Ellis	B. Wayne Hughes	1 mile	1:36.00	$113,100	
2004	Sir Shackleton	Rafael Bejarano	Nick Zito	Tracy Farmer	1 mile	1:37.61	$110,800	III
2003	Midas Eyes	Jerry Bailey	Robert J. Frankel	Edmund A. Gann	1 mile	1:36.22	$167,400	III
2002	Sky Terrace	Craig Perret	Vickie Foley	Vickie Foley & T. Thieneman	1 mile	1:36.87	$112,800	III
2001	Meetyouathebrig	Robby Albarado	W. Elliott Walden	Mansell Stable & James Stone	1 mile	1:36.22	$117,000	III
2000	Performing Magic	Pat Day	Alex Hassinger, Jr.	The Thoroughbred Corp.	1 mile	1:35.99	$114,000	III
1999	Patience Game	Corey Nakatani	Alex Hassinger Jr.	The Thoroughbred Corp.	1 mile	1:37.86	$118,626	III
1998	Souvenir Copy	David Flores	Bob Baffert	John & Betty Mabee	1 mile	1:37.80	$113,300	III
1997	Richter Scale	Shane Sellers	Patrick B. Byrne	Richard Kaster	1 mile	1:36.00	$116,870	III
1996	Valid Expectations	Don Pettinger	Steve Asmussen	Robert & Leland Ackerley	1 mile	1:36.81	$128,375	III
1995	Peaks and Valleys	Julie Krone	James E. Day	Pin Oak Stable	1 mile	1:36.53	$113,100	III
1994	Numerous	Chris McCarron	Charlie Whittingham	Howard B. Keck	1 mile	1:37.34	$111,600	III
1993	Cherokee Run	Pat Day	Frank A. Alexander	Jill E. Robinson	1 mile	1:37.40	$100,000	III
1992	Alydeed	Craig Perret	Roger Attfield	Kinghaven Farms	1 mile	1:36.20	$86,550	III
1991	Alydavid	Pat Day	Philip M. Hauswald	David's Farm	1 mile	1:36.40	$75,000	III
1990	Housebuster	Craig Perret	Warren A. Croll Jr.	Robert P. Levy	1 mile	1:37.60	$75,000	III
1989	Houston	Laffit Pincay Jr.	D. Wayne Lukas	B. Beal / L.R. French / D. W. Lukas	1 mile	1:36.20	$85,000	III
1988	Jim's Orbit	Shane Romero	Clarence Picou	James Cottrell	1 mile	1:38.60	$60,000	III
1987	On The Line	Pat Day	D. Wayne Lukas	Eugene V. Klein	1 mile	1:36.60	$65,000	III
1986	Savings	Patrick Johnson	Gary Hartlage	Diana & Keith Wiseman	1 mile	1:35.60	$65,000	III
1985	Creme Fraiche	Randy Romero	Woody Stephens	Brushwood Stable	1 mile	1:37.60	$65,000	III
1984	Devil's Bag	Eddie Maple	Woody Stephens	Hickory Tree Stable	1 mile	1:35.60	$60,000	
1983	Caveat	Laffit Pincay Jr.	Woody Stephens	August Belmont IV	1 mile	1:37.80	$60,000	
1982	Listcapade	Darrell Haire	Dewey P. Smith	Dorothy Dorsett Brown	1 mile	1:36.20	$50,000	
1981	What It Is	Julio Espinoza	Mark E. Casse	Norman E. Casse	7 fur.	1:24.60	$30,000	
1980	Royal Sporan	Don Brumfield	Don Jeffries	Dan Logan	7 fur.	1:25.60	$25,000	
1979	Dreamy Prospect	Richard DePass	Lyle Whiting	Edwin Whittaker	7 fur.	1:24.40	$28,166	
1978	Braze and Bold	Jim McKnight	Lyle Whiting	Charles Viar	7 fur.	1:25.40	$20,000	
1977	Kodiack	Rudy L. Turcotte	Harvey L. Vanier	Louis F. Aitken	7 fur.	1:25.20	$20,000	
1976	Justa Bad Boy	William Gavidia	Anthony L. Basile	Emil A. Dust	1 mile	1:38.00	$20,000	
1975	Round Stake	Michael Hole	H. Allen Jerkens	Hobeau Farm	1 mile	1:36.40	$20,000	
1974	Ga Hai	Mike Manganello	Gene Cleveland	Laguna Seca Ranch	1 mile	1:38.00	$20,000	
1973	Settecento	Larry Adams	Lefty Nickerson	Martin J. Wygod	1 mile	1:37.00	$15,000	
1972	Key to the Mint	Braulio Baeza	J. Elliott Burch	Rokeby Stables	1 mile	1:36.20	$15,000	
1971	Vegas Vic	Howard Grant	Randy Sechrest	Sechrest & Fritz	1 mile	1:37.00	$20,000	
1970	Admiral's Shield	Jimmy Nichols	Harvey L. Vanier	William C. Robinson Jr.	1 mile	1:37.20	$15,000	
1969	Ack Ack	Manuel Ycaza	Frank A. Bonsal	Cain Hoy Stable	1 mile	1:34.40	$15,000	
1968	Proper Proof	Johnny Sellers	Jim Mosbacher	Mrs. Montgomery Fisher	1 mile	1:36.00	$15,000	
1967	Barbs Delight	Bill Hartack	Hal Steele	Huguelet Jr. et al.	1 mile	1:35.40	$15,000	
1966	Exhibitionist	Eddie Belmonte	Hirsch Jacobs	Ethel D. Jacobs	1 mile	1:36.00	$25,000	
1965	Bold Lad	Bill Hartack	William C. Winfrey	Wheatley Stable	1 mile	1:35.20	$17,500	
1964	Hill Rise	Bill Shoemaker	William B. Finnegan	El Peco Ranch	1 mile	1:35.20	$15,000	
1963	Bonjour	Bill Shoemaker	Hirsch Jacobs	Patrice Jacobs	1 mile	1:36.40	$15,000	
1962	Roman Line	Jimmy Combest	Vester R. Wright	T. Alie Grissom	1 mile	1:37.20	$15,000	
1961	Crozier	Braulio Baeza	Charles R. Parke	Fred W. Hooper	1 mile	1:34.60	$15,000	
1960	Beau Purple	Eric Guerin	George P. Odom	Jack Dreyfus	1 mile	1:35.60	$15,000	
1959	Open View (1st)	Karl Korte	Raymond F. Metcalf	Elkcam Stable	1 mile	1:35.60	$15,000	
1959	First Landing (2nd)	Eddie Arcaro	Casey Hayes	Meadow Stable	1 mile	1:36.20	$15,000	
1958	Tim Tam	Ismael Valenzuela	Horace A. Jones	Calumet Farm	1 mile	1:39.20	$15,000	
1957	Federal Hill	Willie Carstens	Milton Rieser	Clifford Lussky	1 mile	1:36.20	$15,000	
1956	Fabius	Bill Hartack	Horace A. Jones	Calumet Farm	1 mile	1:36.60	$15,000	
1955	Flying Fury	Conn McCreary	Loyd Gentry Jr.	Cain Hoy Stable	1 mile	1:38.00	$15,000	
1954	Hasty Road	John H. Adams	Harry Trotsek	Hasty House Farm	1 mile	1:35.00	$15,000	
1953	Dark Star	Henry E. Moreno	Eddie Hayward	Cain Hoy Stable	1 mile	1:36.00	$15,000	
1952	Hill Gail	Eddie Arcaro	Ben A. Jones	Calumet Farm	1 mile	1:35.40	$15,000	
1951	Fanfare	Douglas Dodson	Ben A. Jones	Calumet Farm	1 mile	1:36.60	$15,000	
1950	Black George	Eric Nelson	Raymond Barnett	William H. Veeneman	1 mile	1:38.00	$10,000	
1949	Olympia	Eddie Arcaro	Ivan H. Parke	Fred W. Hooper	1 mile	1:37.40	$12,500	
1948	Citation	Eddie Arcaro	Ben A. Jones	Calumet Farm	1 mile	1:37.40	$10,000	
1947	Faultless	Douglas Dodson	Ben A. Jones	Calumet Farm	1 mile	1:37.60	$10,000	
1946	Rippey	Ferril Zufelt	Edward L. Snyder	William G. Helis	1 mile	1:40.20	$10,000	
1945	Burning Dream	Douglas Dodson	James W. Smith	Edward R. Bradley	1 mile	1:38.20	$5,000	
1944	Broadcloth	Ferril Zufelt	Charles T. Leavitt	Mrs. George Poulsen	1 mile	1:37.20	$4,500	
1943	Ocean Wave	Wendell Eads	Ben A. Jones	Calumet Farm	1 mile	1:38.20	$2,500	
1942	Valdina Orphan	Carroll Bierman	Frank Catrone	Valdina Farms	1 mile	1:36.80	$2,500	
1941	Blue Pair	Harry Richards	Willie Crump	Vera S. Bragg	1 mile	1:36.60	$2,500	
1940	Bimelech	Fred A. Smith	William A. Hurley	Edward R. Bradley	1 mile	1:38.00	$2,500	
1939	Viscounty	Carroll Bierman	John J. Flanigan	Valdina Farms	1 mile	1:38.40	$2,500	
1938	The Chief	George Woolf	Earl Sande	Col. Maxwell Howard	1 mile	1:35.80	$2,500	
1937	Dellor	Basil James	John Milton Goode	James W. Parrish	1 mile	1:38.20	$1,500	
1936	He Did	Charley Kurtsinger	J. Thomas Taylor	Suzanne Mason	1 mile	1:37.40	$1,100	
1935	Whiskolo	Willie Garner	Robert McGarvey	Milky Way Farm Stable	1 mile	1:37.80	$1,100	
1934	Peace Chance	Wayne Wright	Pete Coyne	Joseph E. Widener	1 mile	1:35.80	$800	
1933	Head Play	Herb Fisher	Willie Crump	Ruth Crump	1 mile	1:39.40	$800	
1932	Adobe Post	Charles Landolt	C. E. Gross	Knebelkamp & Morris	1 mile	1:38.80	$1,200	
1931	Boys Howdy	Gilbert Riley	Loyd Gentry Sr.	Harry C. Hatch	1 mile	1:38.20	$2,000	
1930	Uncle Luther	Robert Creese	Robert L. Stivers	Luther Stivers	1 mile	1:41.80	$1,500	
1929	Windy City	Earl L. Pool	Mose Lowenstein	Fred Grabner	1 mile	1:42.20	$1,500	
1928	Race not held							
1927	Rolled Stocking	Willie Pool	Charles C. Van Meter	James W. Parrish	1 mile	1:38.60	$1,500	
1926	Rhinock	Mack Garner	William D. Covington	Mrs. George B. Cox	1 mile	1:39.00	$2,000	
1925	Kentucky Cardinal	Mack Garner	Mose F. Shapoff	G. Frank Croissant	1 mile	1:38.80	$2,000	
1924	Black Gold	J. D. Mooney	Hanley Webb	Rosa M. Hoots	1 mile	1:37.80	$2,000	

== See also ==
- Road to the Kentucky Derby

== External Sites ==
- 2025 Churchill Downs Media Guide - $600,000 Pat Day Mile presented by TwinSpires (Grade II)
