= Bahamas Stakes =

- Class: Discontinued stakes
- Location: Hialeah Park Race Track; Hialeah, Florida, United States
- Inaugurated: 1934 last run 2001
- Race type: Thoroughbred – Flat racing
- Website: N/A

Race information
- Distance: 7 furlongs
- Surface: Dirt
- Track: left-handed
- Qualification: Three-year-olds
- Weight: Assigned

The Bahamas Stakes was an American Thoroughbred horse race run annually in January at Hialeah Park Race Track in Hialeah, Florida. A seven furlong race on dirt, it was the first important test of the calendar year for newly turned three-year-olds. The race was used by prospective U.S. Triple Crown contenders as a stepping stone to the Everglades and Flamingo Stakes at the Hialeah track. Reflected Glory (1967) and Pistols and Roses (1992), swept all three events.

Inaugurated in 1934 as the Bahamas Handicap, it was run in two divisions in 1952, 1953, and 1969.

By the mid-1980s, the racing dates available to Hialeah Park track forced a rescheduling of the race and as such it would rarely be contested by Triple Crown hopefuls. Hialeah Park closed permanently after the 2001 racing season.

== Racenotes ==
The 1937 winner, No Sir, was owned and trained by twenty-three-year-old Mary Hirsch who on April 2, 1935, became the first female to receive a trainers license.

The great Bold Ruler equalled the track record in his 1957 win. His mark was matched by Sir Gaylord in 1962 and then broken by New Prospect in 1972.

Four horses who were beaten in the Bahamas Stakes went on to win the Kentucky Derby:

- Tim Tam (1958)
- Venetian Way (1960)
- Carry Back (1961)
- Forward Pass (1968)

== Winners ==
Year	Winner	Jockey	Trainer	Owner	Dist. (Miles)	Time
2001	American Century	José A. Santos	Todd A. Pletcher	Peachtree Stable	6 F	1:09.23
2000	Don't Tell The Kids	Jorge Tejeira	Robert J. Durso	O. Wayne Link	7 F	1:22.97
1999	Sagthun	Abdiel Toribio	Carlos Morales	Maria Blanca Stable	7 F	1:24.68
1998	Gallapiat's Aussie	Jose A. Rivera II	Reynaldo Nobles	Tre-Colore Stables Inc.	7 F	1:23.72
1997	Michelle'sallhands	Gary Boulanger	Mario Zacco	Karon & Mario Zacco	7 F	1:25.53
1996	Fortunate Review	Abdiel Toribio	Manuel Azpurua	S. J. G. Racing Stable Inc.	7 F	1:24.45
1995	Koennecker	Carlos Lopez Sr.	Louis M. Goldfine	Sidney L. Port	7 F	1:22.53
1994	Exclusive Praline	José A. Santos	Steve Towne	Frank C. Calabrese	7 F	1:23.59
1993	Great Navigator	Heberto Castillo Jr.	John F. Mazza	Roron Stables	7 F	1:24.14
1992	No race					
1991	Pistols and Roses	Heberto Castillo Jr.	George Gianos	Willis Family Stables, Inc.	7 F	1:23.60
1990	No race					
1989	Halrose	Douglas Valiente	Frank A. Passero Jr.	A A Stable	7 F	1:23.00
1988	Position Leader †	Jorge Duarte	Pepe Mendez	S. Garazi & M. Besso	7 F	1:24.00
1987	Faster Than Sound	Craig Perret	Edwin K. Cleveland	H. J. Allen & Howard Kaskel	7 F	1:22.80
1986	One Magic Moment	Craig Perret	Joseph H. Pierce Jr.	Greyhound Stable & Herb Kligman	7 F	1:22.60
1984	Bello	Earlie Fires	Joseph M. Bollero	Lois Bollero	7 F	1:22.00
1982	Aloma's Ruler	Ángel Cordero Jr.	John J. Lenzini Jr.	Nathan Scherr	7 F	1:22.20
1981	Well Decorated	Don MacBeth	Eugene Jacobs	Herbert Allen	7 F	1:22.20
1980	Irish Tower	Jeffrey Fell	Stanley M. Hough	Malcolm H. Winfield	7 F	1:22.60
1978	Quadratic	Eddie Maple	Woody Stephens	August Belmont IV & Jim Ryan	7 F	1:23.00
1977	No race					
1976	Proud Birdie	Jack Fieselman	Rosemary Henderson	Diamonte Stable	7 F	1:22.60
1975	Ascetic	Michael Hole	Woody Stephens	Mill House Stable	7 F	1:22.00
1974	Hasty Flyer	Mike Miceli	Harry Trotsek	Hasty House Farm	7 F	1:23.00
1973	Royal and Regal	Walter Blum	Warren A. Croll Jr.	Aisco Stable	7 F	1:22.00
1972	New Prospect	Mike Manganello	Richard Fischer	Mrs. Wallace Gilroy	7 F	1:21.40
1971	Jim French	Ángel Cordero Jr.	John P. Campo	Oxford Stable	7 F	1:24.20
1970	Silent Screen	John L. Rotz	J. Bowes Bond	Elberon Fsrm	7 F	1:23.00
1969-1	Ack Ack	Manuel Ycaza	Frank A. Bonsal	Cain Hoy Stable	7 F	1:22.60
1969-2	Fast Hilarious	Ron Turcotte	Joseph M. Bollero	Dorothy C. Rigney	7 F	1:22.80
1968	Verbatim	John L. Rotz	Jerry C. Meyer	Elmendorf Farm	7 F	1:22.20
1967	Reflected Glory	Jorge Velásquez	Hirsch Jacobs	Ethel D. Jacobs	7 F	1:23.00
1966	Graustark	Braulio Baeza	Loyd Gentry Jr.	Darby Dan Farm	7 F	1:23.60
1965	Sparkling Johnny	Mike Venezia	Burley Parke	Harbor View Farm	7 F	1:24.40
1964	Roman Brother	Manuel Ycaza	Burley Parke	Harbor View Farm	7 F	1:23.40
1963	Sky Wonder	Steve Brooks	Budd Lepman	Mrs. Charles D. Morgan	7 F	1:24.60
1962	Sir Gaylord	Ismael Valenzuela	Casey Hayes	Christopher Chenery	7 F	1:22.00
1961	Vapor Whirl	Bill Hartack	Larry Thompson	Alamode Farm	7 F	1:23.80
1960	Bally Ache	Bobby Ussery	Jimmy Pitt	Edgehill Farm (Leonard D. & Morris Fruchtman)	7 F	1:23.40
1959	Troilus	Chris Rogers	Charles Peoples	Bayard Sharp	7 F	1:23.80
1958	Olymar	Howard Grant	Charles R. Parke	Fred W. Hooper	7 F	1:23.60
1957	Bold Ruler	Ted Atkinson	James E. Fitzsimmons	Wheatley Stable	7 F	1:22.00
1956	Eiffel Blue	Eugene Rodriguez	A. G. (Bob) Robertson	Daniel G. Arnstein	7 F	1:24.80
1955	Boston Doge	Eric Guerin	Frank Andolino	Paul Andolino	7 F	1:24.40
1954	Goyamo	Conn McCreary	Woody Stephens	Woodvale Farm	7 F	1:23.60
1953	King Pen 1st Div	Logan Batcheller	Frank S. Barnett	Hal Price Headley	7 F	1:27.20
1953	First Aid 2nd Div	Ira Hanford	Preston M. Burch	Brookmeade Stable	7 F	1:26.40
1952	Quiet Step 1st Div	Douglas Dodson	Kay Eric Jensen	Apheim Stable (Bernard Heiman)	7 F	1:24.20
1952	Trick Pilot 2nd Div	Ovie Scurlock	James W. Healy	Vera S. Bragg	7 F	1:25.20
1951	Elixir	Hedley Woodhouse	David J. Schneider	David J. Schneider	7 F	1:25.60
1950	Theory	Douglas Dodson	Horace A. Jones	Calumet Farm	7 F	1:24.60
1949	Commodore Lea	Conn McCreary	Buck Hazzard	Sidney I. Crew	7 F	1:23.80
1948	Relic	Ted Atkinson	Burton B. Williams	Circle M. Farm (Edward S. Moore)	7 F	1:23.20
1947	Imperator	Jimmy Reynolds	Arthur Brent	Col. R. S. McLaughlin	7 F	1:25.00
1946	Cedar Creek	Eddie Arcaro	William B. Finnegan	Walter P. Chrysler Jr.	7 F	1:24.00
1946	Wee Admiral	Herb Lindberg	Arthur Brent	Col. R. S. McLaughlin	7 F	1:24.40
1945	No race					
1944	Ariel Flight	Mike Caffarella	Willie Martin	Sam Fineberg	7 F	1:25.60
1943	No race					
1942	American Wolf	Don Meade	William C. Winfrey	Alice F. Sherman	7 F	1:24.60
1941	Dispose	Alfred Robertson	Max Hirsch	King Ranch	7 F	1:22.40
1940	Red Dock	Eddie Arcaro	John M. Gaver Sr.	Greentree Stable	7 F	1:24.20
1939	Royal Pam	Ira Hanford	Sherrill W. Ward	Johnson N. Camden Jr.	7 F	1:23.80
1938	Lavengro	Verne Thompson	Elwood L. Fitzgerald	Norman W. Church	7 F	1:24.40
1937	No Sir	Jack Westrope	Mary Hirsch	Mary Hirsch	7 F	1:23.80
1936	Maeriel	Eddie Litzenberger	George E. Phillips	Maemere Farm (DeWitt Page)	7 F	1:25.60
1935	Roman Soldier	Silvio Coucci	Phil Reuter	W. Sachsenmaler & P. Reuter	7 F	1:25.40
1934	Time Supply	Don Meade	Frank C. Travis	Mrs. Frank A. Carreaud	7 F	1:23.00

- † Run November 28, 1987.
