= Ack Ack (horse) =

American-bred Thoroughbred racehorse

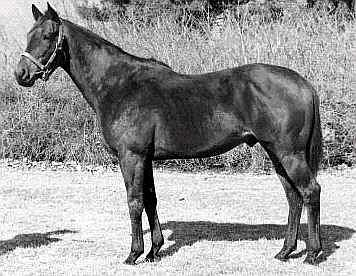
- Sire: Battle Joined
- Grandsire: Armageddon
- Dam: Fast Turn
- Damsire: Turn-To
- Sex: Stallion
- Foaled: 1966
- Died: 1990
- Country: United States
- Color: Brown
- Breeder: Harry F. Guggenheim
- Owner: Cain Hoy Stable; E. E. "Buddy" Fogelson (1971)
- Trainer: Woody Stephens (age 2); Frank A. Bonsal (age 3); Charlie Whittingham (age 4 & 5)
- Record: 27: 19-6-0
- Earnings: $636,641

Major wins
- Bahamas Stakes (1969); Forerunner Stakes (1969); Arlington Classic (1969); Withers Stakes (1969); Derby Trial (1969); Autumn Days Handicap (1970); Los Angeles Handicap (1970); Santa Anita Handicap (1971); American Handicap (1971); San Antonio Handicap (1971); Hollywood Gold Cup (1971); San Carlos Handicap (1971); San Pasqual Handicap (1971)

Awards
- U.S. Champion Older Male Horse (1971); U.S. Champion Sprint Horse (1971); United States Horse of the Year (1971)

Honours
- United States Racing Hall of Fame (1986) #44 - Top 100 U.S. Racehorses of the 20th Century; Ack Ack Handicap at Churchill Downs; Ack Ack Handicap at Hollywood Park; Holds the 5½ Furlong main track record with 5 other horses at the Del Mar Racetrack

Ack Ack (February 24, 1966 – November 7, 1990) was an American Thoroughbred Hall of Fame racehorse.

== Background ==
Ack Ack was a brown horse bred in Kentucky by Harry F. Guggenheim and owned by Guggenheim's Cain Hoy Stable. He was trained by Charlie Whittingham.

== Racing career ==
He raced with success from age two to four, scoring wins in the important 1969 Withers Stakes and Arlington Classic. In 1971 at age five, Ack Ack blossomed into the year's most dominant horse, winning seven straight graded stakes races on both dirt and grass courses at a variety of distances. His performances earned him United States Horse of the Year honors.

Following Guggenheim's death in January 1971, Ack Ack was sold by the executors of Guggenheim's estate. The horse won the San Carlos Handicap less than a week before Guggenheim died. New owner E. E. "Buddy" Fogelson, husband of actress Greer Garson, bought Ack Ack for $500,000. In 1971, Ack Ack won seven of eight races and finished second in the other start. He won his final race, the Hollywood Gold Cup, in which he carried 134 pounds.

== Stud record ==
Ack Ack's grave at Claiborne Farm

At the end of the year, Ack Ack was retired to stand at stud at his birthplace of Claiborne Farm near Paris, Kentucky, where he sired 40 stakes winners, including champion sire Broad Brush and Youth, the 1976 American Champion Male Turf Horse, which won a combined four Grade/Group 1 races in France, Canada, and the United States.

== Assessment ==
In 1999, The Blood Horse, Inc., selected Ack Ack as one of the top 100 racehorses of the 20th century.

== Sire line tree ==
- Ack Ack
  - Youth
    - Teenoso
      - Young Buster
      - Carlton
      - Young Sparticus
      - Horus
    - Seismic Wave
    - Palemon
  - Broadsword
    - Flashing Steel
  - Flying Target
  - Joanies Chief
  - Truce Maker
  - Ackstatic
  - Broad Brush
    - Schossberg
    - Concern
      - Good Night Shirt
    - Best Of Luck
    - Nobo True
    - Include
      - Ferox
      - Redeemed
      - Don Inc
      - Mishegas
      - Riker
    - Mongoose
    - Quest Star
    - Hesanoldsalt

== Pedigree ==
Pedigree of Ack Ack (USA), brown stallion, 1966
Sire Battle Joined (USA) 1959	Armegeddon (USA); 1949	Alsab	Good Goods
Sire Battle Joined (USA) 1959	Armegeddon (USA); 1949	Alsab	Winds Chant
Sire Battle Joined (USA) 1959	Armegeddon (USA); 1949	Fighting Lady	Sir Gallahad*
Sire Battle Joined (USA) 1959	Armegeddon (USA); 1949	Fighting Lady	Lady Nicotine
Sire Battle Joined (USA) 1959	Ethel Walker (USA); 1953	Revoked	Blue Larkspur
Sire Battle Joined (USA) 1959	Ethel Walker (USA); 1953	Revoked	Gala Belle*
Sire Battle Joined (USA) 1959	Ethel Walker (USA); 1953	Ethel Terry	Reaping Reward*
Sire Battle Joined (USA) 1959	Ethel Walker (USA); 1953	Ethel Terry	Mary Terry
Dam Fast Turn (USA) 1959	Turn-To (IRE); 1951	Royal Charger	Nearco
Dam Fast Turn (USA) 1959	Turn-To (IRE); 1951	Royal Charger	Sun Princess
Dam Fast Turn (USA) 1959	Turn-To (IRE); 1951	Source Sucree	Admiral Drake
Dam Fast Turn (USA) 1959	Turn-To (IRE); 1951	Source Sucree	Lavendula
Dam Fast Turn (USA) 1959	Cherokee Rose (USA); 1951	Princequillo	Prince Rose
Dam Fast Turn (USA) 1959	Cherokee Rose (USA); 1951	Princequillo	Conquilla
Dam Fast Turn (USA) 1959	Cherokee Rose (USA); 1951	The Squaw	Sickle*
Dam Fast Turn (USA) 1959	Cherokee Rose (USA); 1951	The Squaw	Minnewaska

* Ack Ack is inbred 4S x 5S to the stallion Sir Gallahad, meaning that he appears fourth generation and fifth generation (via Gala Belle) on the sire side of his pedigree.

* Ack Ack is inbred 5S x 4D to the stallion Sickle, meaning that he appears fifth generation (via Reaping Reward) on the sire side of his pedigree, and fourth generation on the dam side of his pedigree.
