= Youth (horse) =

American-bred Thoroughbred racehorse

- Sire: Ack Ack
- Grandsire: Battle Joined
- Dam: Gazala
- Damsire: Dark Star
- Sex: Stallion
- Foaled: 1973
- Country: United States
- Colour: Bay
- Breeder: Nelson Bunker Hunt
- Owner: Nelson Bunker Hunt
- Trainer: Maurice Zilber
- Record: 11: 8-1-1
- Earnings: US$687,224

Major wins
- Prix Daru (1976); Prix Greffulhe (1976); Prix Lupin (1976); Prix du Jockey Club (1976); Prix Niel (1976); Canadian International (1976); Washington, D.C. International (1976)

Awards
- American Champion Male Turf Horse (1976); Timeform rating: 135

Youth (foaled 1973 in Maryland) was an American-bred French Thoroughbred racehorse.

== Background ==
Youth was a Brown horse, bred and owned by Texas oilman, Nelson Bunker Hunt. Youth was sired by U.S. Racing Hall of Fame inductee Ack Ack. His dam was Hunt's French-bred mare Gazala II, a daughter of the 1953 Kentucky Derby winner, Dark Star. Gazala II was a brilliant racehorse and champion filly of France winning the French 1,000 Guineas and Prix de Diane in 1967. She was broodmare of the year in 1976 having produced not only Youth but the colt Mississipian who won the Grand Critérium and Gonzales.

Youth was sent to race in Europe where he was trained from a base at Chantilly Racecourse by Maurice Zilber,

== Racing career ==
Youth's best result in a conditions race at age two was a runner up position in the 1975 Prix Saint-Roman at Longchamp Racecourse in Paris. At age three, Youth developed into a major star on the turf both in France and in North America. In 1976, he won five important races in France including the Prix Lupin and the French Derby. On October 3, he ran third in the Prix de l'Arc de Triomphe to winner Ivanjica, after which he was shipped to Woodbine Racetrack in Toronto, Canada, where under Hall of Fame jockey Sandy Hawley he won the October 23 Canadian International Championship Stakes. Youth then was sent to Laurel Park Racecourse in Laurel, Maryland for the November 6 Washington, D.C. International Stakes. Again ridden by Sandy Hawley, the colt defeated Arc winner Ivanjica to take the prestigious event by ten lengths. Youth's performances earned him the Eclipse Award as the American Champion Male Turf Horse of 1976.

== Stud record ==
Youth was retired to stud duty in 1977 at Gainesway Farm in Lexington, Kentucky where he most notably sired Teenoso, winner of England's Epsom Derby (1983), King George VI & Queen Elizabeth Diamond Stakes (1984), and France's Grand Prix de Saint-Cloud (1984). He also sired the Grade 1 winners Sharaya (1980) and Young Mother (1986) both winners of the Prix Vermeille, Longchamp.

Youth sired the following graded stakes winners.

- Rattling Wind (1978) Premio Mario Incisa (gr.3) Italy
- Buchanette (1979) Prix de Flore (gr.3) France
- Teenoso (1980) Epsom Derby, King George VI & Queen Elizabeth Stakes, Grand Prix de St Cloud, Ormonde Stakes England & France
- Sharaya (1980) Prix Vermeille, Prix de la Nonette France
- Seismic Wave (1981) Ormonde Stakes England
- Young Mother (1986) Prix Vermeille, Prix de Malleret France

In 1987 Youth was later sold for stud purposes to Brazil Where he sired the Brazilian Derby winner of 1992 Palemon and the graded stakes winner Luzette.

== Sire line tree ==
- Youth
  - Teenoso
    - Young Buster
    - Carlton
    - Young Sparticus
    - Horus
  - Seismic Wave
  - Palemon
