= Teenoso =

American-bred, British-trained Thoroughbred racehorse

- Racing silks of Eric B. Moller
- Sire: Youth
- Grandsire: Ack Ack
- Dam: Furioso
- Damsire: Ballymoss
- Sex: Stallion
- Foaled: 7 April 1980
- Country: United States
- Colour: Dark bay or Brown
- Breeder: Eric B. Moller & White Lodge Stud
- Owner: Mollers Racing
- Trainer: Harry Wragg; Geoff Wragg
- Record: 13: 6-1-3

Major wins
- Lingfield Derby Trial (1983); Epsom Derby (1983); Ormonde Stakes (1984); Grand Prix de Saint-Cloud (1984); King George VI and Queen Elizabeth Stakes (1984)

Awards
- Timeform best middle distance horse (1984); Top-rated European older horse (1984); Timeform rating: 135

Teenoso (7 April 1980 – 4 October 1999) was an American-bred, British-trained Thoroughbred racehorse. After showing moderate form as a two-year-old, he improved in the spring of 1983 to win the Group Three Lingfield Derby Trial and the Epsom Derby, giving Lester Piggott a record ninth win in the Classic race. Teenoso was beaten in his two remaining races that year but showed good form as a four-year-old, winning the Ormonde Stakes, the Grand Prix de Saint-Cloud and, on his final appearance, the King George VI and Queen Elizabeth Stakes. He proved to be a disappointment at stud.

== Background ==
Teenoso was a dark-coated bay horse with a small white star and a white sock on his left hind leg, bred in Kentucky by Ralph "Budgie" Moller and his brother, Eric, who owned the colt during his racing career. He was described as a bay when racing, but when standing at stud he was described as being "dark bay or brown". Teenoso was the best horse sired by Youth, the winner of the Prix du Jockey Club Washington, D.C. International in 1976. His dam, Furioso, who finished second in the 1974 Epsom Oaks, also produced the racemare Topsy, who finished second in the 1000 Guineas and won both the Sun Chariot Stakes and the Prix d'Astarte in 1979. Furioso and Teenoso were two of many successful racehorses descended from the Mollers' broodmare Horama. Others included Lacquer (Irish 1,000 Guineas, Cambridgeshire Handicap), Favoletta (Irish 1000 Guineas), Sovereign (Coronation Stakes) and Violetta (Cambridgeshire).

Teenoso was sent into training with Harry Wragg at his Abington Place stables in Newmarket, Suffolk.

== Racing career ==
=== 1982: two-year-old season ===
Teenoso showed little worthwhile form as a two-year-old in 1982. He finished unplaced on his debut over six furlongs at Newmarket in August and was unplaced again over seven furlongs at Doncaster a month later. Teenoso produced a slightly better effort on his final appearance, when he finished fourth on soft ground at Newmarket. The colt ended the season with earnings of £262. At the end of the year, Harry Wragg retired from training, and his stable was taken over by his son Geoff Wragg.

=== 1983: three-year-old season ===
On Teenoso's first appearance as a three-year-old, he finished second in a ten-furlong maiden race at Haydock Park. The first sign of Teenoso's potential came eleven days later at Newmarket Racecourse, when he contested a maiden race over one and a half miles on heavy ground. The colt took the lead three furlongs from the finish and drew away from his opponents to win easily by eight lengths. The spring of 1983 was unusually cold and wet, leaving many horses struggling to reach peak fitness, while others were unable to cope with the unusually soft, muddy conditions. The continuing wet weather forced the abandonment of several trial races, including the Chester Vase (an intended target for Teenoso) and few of the previous year's leading two-year-olds (including Diesis Dunbeath and Gorytus) showed any worthwhile form. Teenoso's improving form and proven ability on heavy ground saw him made third favourite for the Lingfield Derby Trial in May. He took the lead five furlongs from the finish and stayed on well to win by three lengths from Shearwalk.

When Lester Piggott, who had won the race eight times previously, elected to ride Teenoso in the Derby, the colt was strongly supported in the betting and started 9/2 favourite in a field of twenty-one runners. Racing on the heaviest ground seen at Epsom for many years, Teenoso was among the leaders from the start. Piggott sent the colt into the lead early in the straight and he was never in any apparent danger, winning by three lengths from the Irish-trained Carlingford Castle. The winning time of 2:49.07, in very wet going, was the slowest of the 20th century.

The Irish Derby at the Curragh three and a half weeks later saw a meeting between Teenoso and the Prix du Jockey Club winner Caerleon. In contrast to Epsom, the ground in Ireland was unusually firm and Teenoso appeared to be unsuited to the conditions as he finished third, beaten by Shareef Dancer, who won impressively, and Caerleon. Teenoso was then trained for the St. Leger Stakes at Doncaster Racecourse in September. In his trial race, the Great Voltigeur Stakes at York in August, he ran disappointingly, finishing third to Seymour Hicks and Dazari. He returned from the race with an injury originally believed to be a stress fracture of the left hind leg. It seemed that Teenoso's injury would end his career, but subsequent examinations revealed it to be less serious than first feared and he was able to return to training in late autumn.

=== 1984: four-year-old season ===
Teenoso made his four-year-old debut in the Group Three John Porter Stakes at Newbury in April. He started favourite, but in his first run for eight months he was beaten into third place behind Gay Lemur and Dazari, both of whom were receiving weight from the Derby winner. In May Teenoso, accompanied by his pacemaker Mill Plantation, was sent to Chester for the Group Three Ormonde Stakes. Teenoso took the lead three furlongs from the finish and won comfortably by a length and a half from Khairpour. His success made him the first Derby winner to win as a four-year-old since Snow Knight in 1975 and the first to win in Europe since Roberto won the 1973 Coronation Cup.

In his next race, Teenoso returned to Group One level for the first time since the 1983 Irish Derby as he was sent to France to contest the Grand Prix de Saint-Cloud. Piggott positioned Teenoso in fourth place before taking the lead in the straight. Teenoso went two lengths clear of his opponents and held the late challenge of the outsider Fly Me to win by a neck. Shortly before the race Teenoso had thrown his head back, striking Piggott in the face, and the jockey rode the race bleeding heavily from a cut over his right eye. The success was gained on fast ground, contradicting the prevailing opinion that Teenoso needed soft conditions to show his best form.

The ground was also firm at Ascot Racecourse in late July, when Teenoso started at odds of 13/2 against twelve opponents in Britain's most prestigious weight-for-age race, the King George VI and Queen Elizabeth Stakes. The race attracted a strong field including the 1983 winner Time Charter (who started favourite), Darshaan, Sun Princess, Tolomeo and Sadler's Wells. Piggott sent Teenoso into the lead from the start and set a strong gallop alongside His Honour, who was in the race to set the pace for Sun Princess. Teenoso turned into the straight with a half length lead and then broke clear of his opponents to establish a clear advantage. Sadler's Wells emerged as his only serious challenger and reduced the margin to a length entering the final furlong, but Teenoso pulled away again to win by two and a half lengths. The winning time of 2:27.95 was the second fastest in the race's history. Racing observer Brough Scott called the colt "as true a champion as that much misused word can muster", assessed him as the best mile and a half horse in Europe and opined that this victory gave the lie to claims that Teenoso's Derby success the previous year was merely a fluke achieved in very heavy conditions.

Teenoso was then aimed at the Prix de l'Arc de Triomphe at Longchamp in October. He was the 9/4 favourite in the ante-post betting lists when he suffered a slight injury to his right foreleg three days before the race. He was withdrawn from the race on veterinary advice and retired to stud.

== Assessment and honours ==
The independent Timeform organisation gave Teenoso a rating of 132 in 1983, and 135 in 1984. In the latter year Timeform named the best middle-distance horse of the year. In the official International Classification for 1984, Teenoso was rated the best European older horse and the second best horse of any age behind El Gran Senor. In the voting for the British Horse of the Year award, conducted by the Racegoers' Club, he was beaten by seventeen votes to six by the two-year-old Provideo.

In their book A Century of Champions, based on the Timeform rating system, John Randall and Tony Morris rated Teenoso a "superior" winner of the Derby.

== Retirement ==
Teenoso began his stud career at the Highclere Stud but struggled to attract high-quality mares and was not considered a success as a stallion. The best of his progeny was probably Young Buster, who won seven races including the Group Three September Stakes. Other successful flat racers included Carlton (Hansa-Preis) and Starlet (Team Trophy der Volksbanken und Raiffeisenbanken). Teenoso was later moved to the Shade Oak Stud in Shropshire and then to the Pitts Farm Stud at Sherborne in Dorset. Towards the end of his stud career he was standing at a fee of £1,000 and was mainly being used as a National Hunt stallion. The best of his steeplechase performers were Young Spartacus (Mildmay of Flete Handicap Chase, Racing Post Chase) and Horus (Vodafone Gold Cup).

In autumn 1999, Teenoso developed thrombosis and was euthanized on October 4 at Pitts Farm Stud.

== Pedigree ==
Pedigree of Teenoso (USA), bay or brown stallion, 1980
Sire Youth (USA) 1973	Ack Ack (USA); 1966	Battle Joined	Armageddon
Sire Youth (USA) 1973	Ack Ack (USA); 1966	Battle Joined	Ethel Walker
Sire Youth (USA) 1973	Ack Ack (USA); 1966	Fast Turn	Turn-To
Sire Youth (USA) 1973	Ack Ack (USA); 1966	Fast Turn	Cherokee Rose
Sire Youth (USA) 1973	Gazala (FR); 1964	Dark Star	Royal Gem
Sire Youth (USA) 1973	Gazala (FR); 1964	Dark Star	Isolde
Sire Youth (USA) 1973	Gazala (FR); 1964	Belle Angevine	L'Amiral
Sire Youth (USA) 1973	Gazala (FR); 1964	Belle Angevine	Bella
Dam Furioso (GB) 1971	Ballymoss (GB); 1954	Mossborough	Nearco
Dam Furioso (GB) 1971	Ballymoss (GB); 1954	Mossborough	All Moonshine
Dam Furioso (GB) 1971	Ballymoss (GB); 1954	Indian Call	Singapore
Dam Furioso (GB) 1971	Ballymoss (GB); 1954	Indian Call	Flittemere
Dam Furioso (GB) 1971	Violetta (ITY); 1958	Pinza	Chanteur
Dam Furioso (GB) 1971	Violetta (ITY); 1958	Pinza	Pasqua
Dam Furioso (GB) 1971	Violetta (ITY); 1958	Urshalim	Nasrullah
Dam Furioso (GB) 1971	Violetta (ITY); 1958	Urshalim	Horama (Family 3-c)
