= 1967 Kentucky Derby =

Horse race

93rd Kentucky Derby
- Kentucky Derby
- Grade I stakes race
- Location: Churchill Downs
- Date: May 6, 1967
- Winning horse: Proud Clarion
- Jockey: Bobby Ussery
- Trainer: Loyd Gentry Jr.
- Owner: Darby Dan Farm
- Surface: Dirt

The 1967 Kentucky Derby was the 93rd running of the Kentucky Derby. The race took place on May 6, 1967.

== Full results ==
Finished	Post	Horse	Jockey	Trainer	Owner	Time / behind
1st	7	Proud Clarion	Bobby Ussery	Loyd Gentry Jr.	Darby Dan Farm	2:00 3/5
2nd	5	Barbs Delight	Kenny Knapp	Hal Steele Jr.	Guy Huguelet Jr. & Gene Spalding	
3rd	2	Damascus	Bill Shoemaker	Frank Y. Whiteley Jr.	Edith W. Bancroft	
4th	10	Reason to Hail	Walter Blum	Hirsch Jacobs	Patrice Jacobs	
5th	11	Ask the Fare	Donald Holmes	Jere R. Smith Sr.	Holiday Stable	
6th	6	Successor	Braulio Baeza	Edward A. Neloy	Wheatley Stable	
7th	8	Gentleman James	Ronald Campbell	Delmer W. Carroll Sr.	Michael G. Phipps	
8th	1	Ruken	Fernando Alvarez	Clyde Turk	Louis R. Rowan	
9th	4	Diplomat Way	Johnny Sellers	John O. Meaux	Harvey Peltier Sr.	
10th	14	Second Encounter	Bill Phelps	Edwin K. Cleveland Jr.	Harris-Pierce Jr.	
11th	12	Dawn Glory	Earlie Fires	Justino Rodriquez	Establo Eden	
12th	3	Dr. Isby	Bill Hartack	Frank E. Childs	Perne L. Grissom	
13th	13	Field Master	Álvaro Pineda	Warren Stute	Mr. & Mrs. J. H. Seley	
14th	9	Lightning Orphan	Donald Brumfield	Don H. Divine	Reverie Knoll Farm	

- Winning Breeder: John W. Galbreath; (KY)
