= Loyd Gentry Jr. =

American horse trainer

Loyd "Boo" Gentry Jr.
Personal information
- Born: January 19, 1925 Covington, Kentucky, US
- Died: July 1, 2012 (aged 87) Lexington, Kentucky, US
- Occupation: Horse trainer

Horse racing career
- Sport: Horse racing

Major racing wins
- Champagne Stakes (1954); Beldame Stakes (1955); Blue Grass Stakes (1955); Derby Trial Stakes (1955); Forerunner Stakes (1955, 1970); Kentucky Oaks (1955,1969); Princess Pat Stakes (1960); Matron Stakes (1964); Breeders' Futurity Stakes (1964); Arch Ward Stakes (1965); Bahamas Stakes (1966); Cornhusker Handicap (1966); Roamer Handicap (1967); American Classics wins: Kentucky Derby (1967)

Significant horses
- Graustark, Proud Clarion, Lalun

Loyd "Boo" Gentry Jr. (January 19, 1925 – July 1, 2012) was an American horse trainer best known for training Proud Clarion to win the 1967 Kentucky Derby.

== Background ==
Born in Covington, Kentucky, Gentry was the son of jockey and trainer, Loyd Gentry Sr. His father trained for the prominent Canadian horseman Harry C. Hatch for whom he conditioned the winner of the 1941 King's Plate. Loyd Jr. was also the nephew of Olin B. Gentry, who managed the horse breeding operations of Colonel Edward R. Bradley.

Gentry served in the U.S. Coast Guard from 1943 to 1946 during World War II before beginning his career as a trainer.

== Early career ==
Gentry competed mainly at race tracks in New York, South Florida, Kentucky, and Illinois. Gentry trained for several major owners including Harry Frank Guggenheim. In 1955 he sent two of Guggenheim's colts to run in the Kentucky Derby: the Blue Grass Stakes winner Racing Fool, ridden by Henry Moreno, finished fourth, and Flying Fury, winner of the Champagne Stakes, ridden by Conn McCreary, ran sixth. He had previously trained Milton Shagrin's Shag Tails, ridden by John Nazareth, to finish thirteenth in 1952. Gentry also won the Kentucky Oaks and the Beldame Stakes with Lalun in 1955. In 1964, he sent out the two-year-old Umbrella Fella to win four races including the Breeders' Futurity Stakes

== Darby Dan Farm trainer ==
In 1965, Gentry became trainer to John W. Galbreath's Darby Dan Farm. The move forced him to give up training a promising two-year-old named Kauai King who went on to win the following year's Derby. In 1966, Gentry trained Darby Dan Farm's Graustark, winner of the 1965 Arch Ward Stakes at Arlington Park and the 1966 Bahamas Stakes at Hialeah Park. After Buckpasser suffered a quarter crack, Graustark became widely favored to win the Kentucky Derby that year. Because Graustark had never raced over 7 furlongs, it was decided, in spite of a slightly infected left front hoof, to run him in the 9 furlong Blue Grass Stakes as a prep for the 1966 Kentucky Derby. Graustark was beaten by a nose by Abe's Hope after suffering a career-ending injury.

Gentry Jr. trained the 1967 Kentucky Derby winner, Darby Dan Farm's, Proud Clarion, ridden by Bobby Ussery. Proud Clarion finished third in the 1967 Preakness, behind Damascus and In Reality.

== Later career ==
Gentry won a second Kentucky Oaks with Hail to Patsy in 1969 and the Forerunner Stakes with Supreme Quality in 1970.

He continued to train horses until his death on July 1, 2012, at Lexington, Kentucky.
