= Jimmy Combest =

American jockey

Personal information
- Born: June 24, 1926 Louisville, Kentucky, United States
- Died: January 8, 2013 (aged 86) Southwest Ranches, Florida, United States
- Resting place: Fero Memorial Gardens, Beverly Hills, Florida
- Occupations: Jockey, trainer

Horse racing career
- Sport: Horse racing

Major racing wins
- Hawthorne Juvenile Stakes (1948); Motor City Stakes (1949); Chesapeake Stakes (1953); Everglades Handicap (1953); Jersey Derby (1953); Hyde Park Stakes (1954); Laurel Handicap (1954); Oceanport Stakes (1956); Arlington Classic Stakes (1958); Arlington Matron Stakes (1958); Breeders' Futurity Stakes (1958); Arkansas Derby (1960); Narragansett Special (1960); Forerunner Stakes (1962); Derby Trial (1962); Fashion Stakes (1953); Sheepshead Bay Handicap (1957); Acorn Stakes (1963); Matron Stakes (1963); Mother Goose Stakes (1963); Rancocas Stakes (1963); Gotham Stakes (1964); Roamer Handicap (1964); Bernard Baruch Handicap (1965); New Orleans Handicap (1967); Black Gold Stakes (1968); Louisiana Derby (1968)

Significant horses
- Johns Joy, Royal Bay Gem, Spicy Living, Star Reward

James Theodore Combest (June 24, 1926 – January 8, 2013) was a jockey and trainer in American Thoroughbred racing. He was one of three brothers in a prominent racing family. Older brother Nick was both a jockey and trainer while younger brother Reed trained and owned Thoroughbreds his entire career.

== Riding career ==
Combest's professional riding career began in 1946 and by 1953 he was rated among the best in the country. The last year he competed as a jockey was as a fifty-year-old in 1976 when he made only 26 starts.

=== Triple Crown mounts ===
During his time as a jockey, Combest competed in the 1953, 1958, 1959, 1962, 1964 and 1968. Kentucky Derbys. Of these six, his top result came in the 1962 edition. Aboard owner Alie Grissom's colt Roman Line, Combest won the Forerunner Stakes and the Derby Trial before finishing second to Decidedly in the Derby. In the Preakness Stakes, the second leg of the U.S. Triple Crown series, Combest and Roman Line finished third to winner Greek Money and runner-up Ridan. They did not run in the Belmont Stakes.

The first of Combest's two mounts in the Preakness Stakes had come in 1958 when he rode Noureddin to a fifth-place finish behind runner-up Lincoln Road and Calumet Farm's winner and future Hall of Fame inductee Tim Tam. Later in June, Jimmy Combest made his only appearance in the Belmont Stakes, riding Royal Bay Gem to third place behind Tim Tam and the Irish horse Cavan.

As a trainer, Combest met with modest success and would retire from racing to manage a Florida horse farm. He died at age 86 in Southwest Ranches, Florida.
