= Lalun =

American-bred Thoroughbred racehorse

- Sire: Djeddah
- Grandsire: Djebel
- Dam: Be Faithful
- Damsire: Bimelech
- Sex: Mare
- Foaled: 1952
- Country: United States
- Colour: Bay
- Breeder: Harry F. Guggenheim
- Owner: Cain Hoy Stable
- Trainer: Loyd Gentry, Jr.
- Record: 19: 5-1-4
- Earnings: $112,000

Major wins
- Kentucky Oaks (1955); Beldame Stakes (1955)
- Last updated on August 27, 2007

Lalun (1952 – 1977) was an American Thoroughbred racehorse and successful broodmare. Owned and bred by Harry Guggenheim, she was trained by Loyd Gentry, Jr. and under jockey Henry Moreno notably won the 1955 Kentucky Oaks and Beldame Stakes.

As a brood mare, Lalun produced:

- The 1962 U.S. Champion 2-Yr-Old Colt Male Colt Never Bend who in turn sired Mill Reef and Riverman.
- Bold Reason who won the 1971 American and Hollywood Derbys and the Travers Stakes.

== Pedigree ==
Pedigree of Lalun
Sire Djeddah ch. 1945	Djebel b. 1937	Tourbillon	Ksar
Sire Djeddah ch. 1945	Djebel b. 1937	Tourbillon	Durban
Sire Djeddah ch. 1945	Djebel b. 1937	Loika	Gay Crusader
Sire Djeddah ch. 1945	Djebel b. 1937	Loika	Coeur a Coeur
Sire Djeddah ch. 1945	Djezima b. 1933	Asterus	Teddy
Sire Djeddah ch. 1945	Djezima b. 1933	Asterus	Astrella
Sire Djeddah ch. 1945	Djezima b. 1933	Heldifann	Durbar
Sire Djeddah ch. 1945	Djezima b. 1933	Heldifann	Banshee
Dam Be Faithful dk.b. 1942	Bimelech b. 1937	Black Toney	Peter Pan
Dam Be Faithful dk.b. 1942	Bimelech b. 1937	Black Toney	Belgravia
Dam Be Faithful dk.b. 1942	Bimelech b. 1937	La Troienne	Teddy
Dam Be Faithful dk.b. 1942	Bimelech b. 1937	La Troienne	Helene de Troie
Dam Be Faithful dk.b. 1942	Bloodroot b. 1932	Blue Larkspur	Black Servant
Dam Be Faithful dk.b. 1942	Bloodroot b. 1932	Blue Larkspur	Blossom Time
Dam Be Faithful dk.b. 1942	Bloodroot b. 1932	Knockaney Bridge	Bridge of Earn
Dam Be Faithful dk.b. 1942	Bloodroot b. 1932	Knockaney Bridge	Sunshot
