= Buddy Fogelson =

American businessman

- Born: Elijah E. Fogelson; February 16, 1900; Lincoln, Nebraska, U.S.
- Died: December 1, 1987 (aged 87); Dallas, Texas, U.S.
- Education: Texas Christian University
- Occupations: Lawyer, businessman, horse and cattle breeder, philanthropist
- Spouse: Greer Garson (m. 1949)

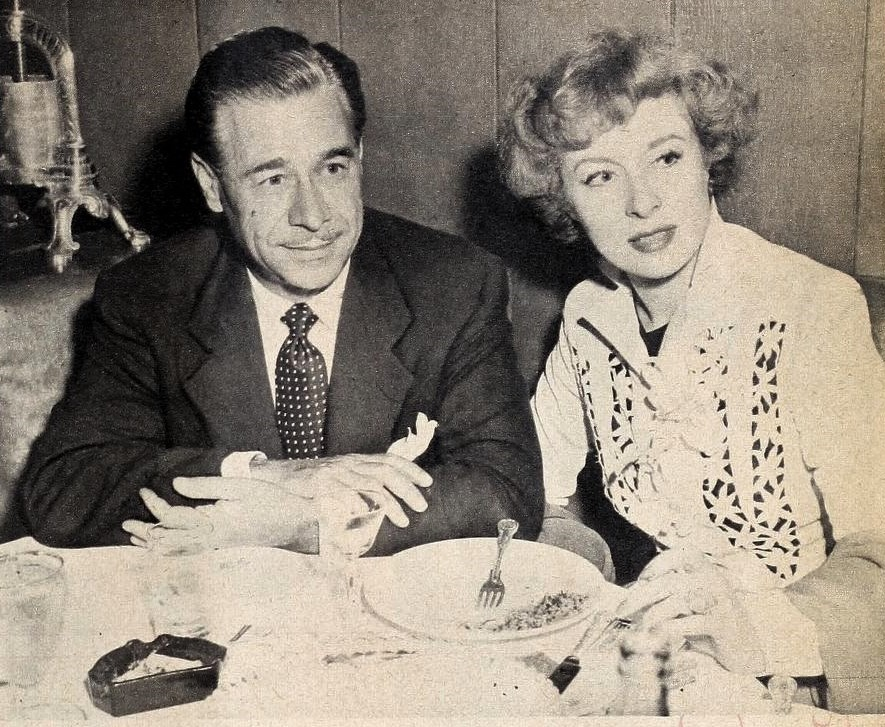
Buddy Fogelson and Greer Garson, 1948

Elijah E. "Buddy" Fogelson (February 16, 1900 – December 1, 1987) was an American lawyer, Army colonel, businessman, horse and cattle breeder, and philanthropist. Although born in Lincoln, Nebraska, he spent a large part of his life in Texas, where he attended Texas Christian University in 1919 and 1920. He went on to make a fortune as a wildcatter in the oil industry.

In 1941, Buddy Fogelson acquired the Forked Lightning Ranch along the Pecos River about 25 miles (40 km) southeast of Santa Fe, New Mexico on which he raised Santa Gertrudis cattle. Over time, he acquired adjacent parcels of land to swell the size of his ranch to 13,000 acres (53 km^{2}). He married actress Greer Garson in 1949, and their marriage lasted almost 40 years until his death.

== Biography ==
During World War II, Fogelson served with the United States Army. Rising to the rank of colonel, he served on General Eisenhower's staff and was the chief of oil procurement for the Allied Forces. Immediately following the surrender of Germany in May 1945, Fogelson was part of the United States Military Mission in Moscow. Discharged from the Army, Fogelson returned to business in Texas.

On 17 April 1947 he co-founded the Pan American Sulphur Company to develop and operate a major sulfur mine in Jaltipan, Veracruz, Mexico.

On a visit to Hollywood in 1948, Fogelson was introduced by his friend Peter Lawford to actress Greer Garson, and the two married a year later. Their marriage lasted almost 40 years until his death. Buddy Fogelson supported Garson's theatrical interest and formed Santa Fe Productions, Inc. that backed several Broadway plays. He is personally listed as the theatrical producer of The Golden Age (1963) and The Passion of Josef D. (1964).

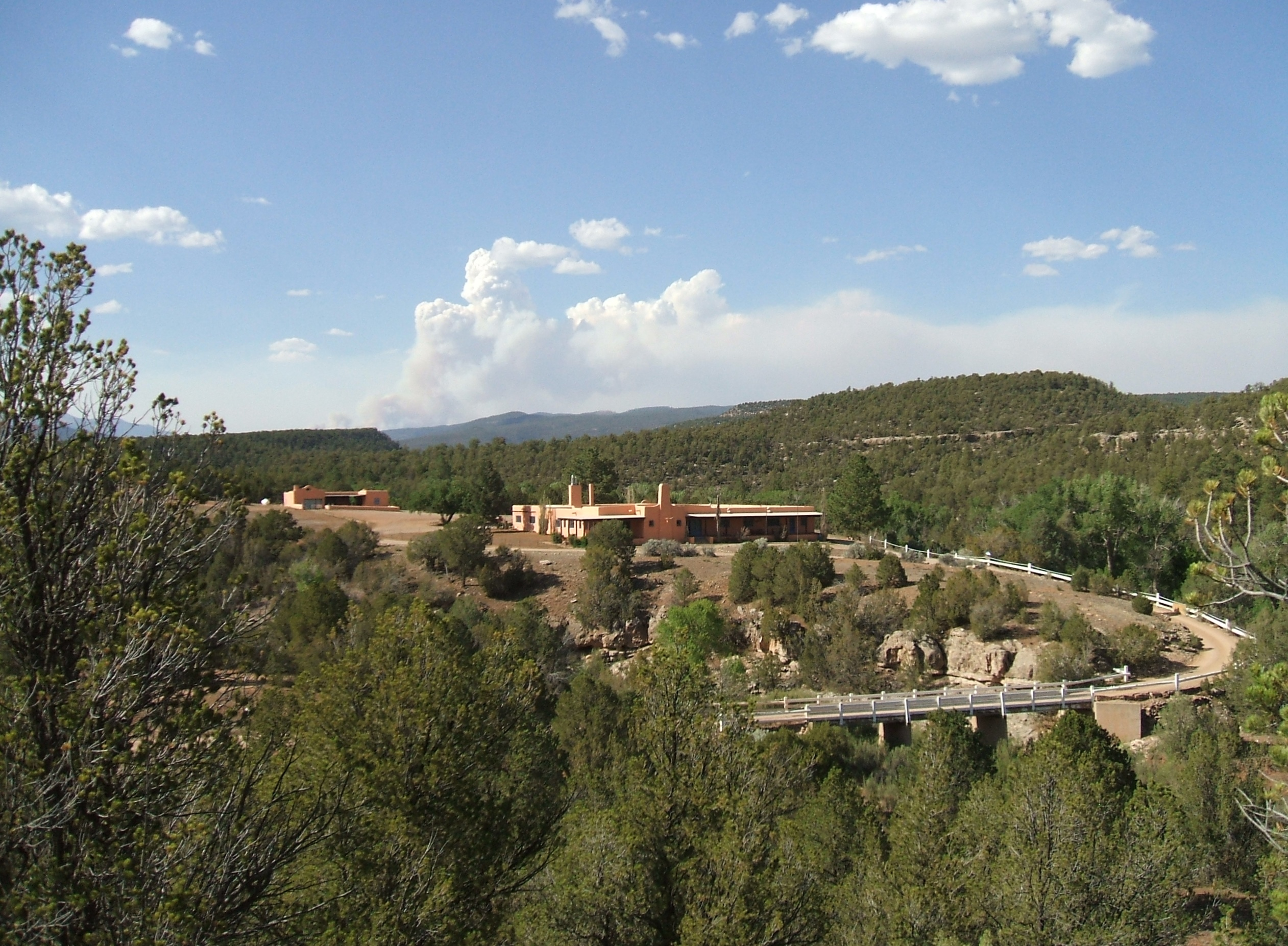
Residence at Forked Lightning Ranch, New Mexico

The couple maintained homes in Dallas and Los Angeles and spent a great deal of time at their Spanish-style hacienda on the Forked Lightning Ranch. An owner/breeder of Thoroughbred racehorses, in 1971, Fogelson purchased Ack Ack from the estate of Harry F. Guggenheim. The horse earned the 1971 Eclipse Award for Outstanding Older Male Horse, as well as the most prestigious United States Horse of the Year award. His nephew and adopted son, Gayle David Fogelson, is today involved in breeding and racing Thoroughbreds.

On Buddy Fogelson's death in 1987, the Forked Lightning Ranch was divided between his widow and his son. In early 1991, failing health forced the elderly Greer Garson Fogelson to sell her portion of the ranch property. It was acquired by the Conservation Fund, which donated it to the National Park Service. This portion of the property is now part of Pecos National Historical Park, while another 5.5 thousand acres (22 km^{2}) were purchased by the late actor Val Kilmer.

== Philanthropy ==
The Fogelsons were financial supporters of Santa Fe opera and theatre. As benefactors to the College of Santa Fe, they made large cash donations, built the E. E. Fogelson Library, and provided funding for scholarships for underprivileged students. Through the E. E. Fogelson and Greer Garson Fogelson Charitable Foundation, the Fogelson Honors Forum at Texas Christian University was created through a $1 million gift. The E. E. "Buddy" Fogelson Scholarship is awarded to previous Field Scovell Scholarship Foundation recipients currently enrolled in college. The E. E. Fogelson and Greer Garson Fogelson Distinguished Chair in Urology is endowed at the University of Texas Southwestern Medical School, as is the University of Texas Health Science Center Distinguished Chair in Medical Research.

Diagnosed with Parkinson's disease in 1982, Buddy Fogelson died in Dallas in 1987.
