= Gregory Duncan Cameron =

American horse trainer

Don Cameron
Personal information
- Born: c. 1894 California, United States
- Died: July 11, 1952
- Occupation: Trainer

Horse racing career
- Sport: Horse racing
- Career wins: Not found

Major racing wins
- Bowie Handicap (1938); Arlington Handicap (1939); Havre de Grace Handicap (1940); Pimlico Special (1940); Champagne Stakes (1942); Pimlico Futurity (1942); Walden Stakes (1942); Wood Memorial Stakes (1943); Great American Stakes (1945); Saratoga Special Stakes (1945); Santa Anita Handicap (1949, 1952); Suburban Handicap (1949); Tanforan Handicap (1949); La Sorpresa Handicap (1950) U.S. Triple Crown wins: Kentucky Derby (1943); Preakness Stakes (1943); Belmont Stakes (1943); United States Triple Crown (1943)

Significant horses
- Challedon, Count Arthur, Count Fleet, Vulcan's Forge, Miche

Gregory Duncan "Don" Cameron (c. 1894 – July 11, 1952) was an American Thoroughbred horse trainer who trained Count Fleet, who won the U.S. Triple Crown in 1943.

A native of California, Don Cameron served as an aviator in the United States Military during World War I. Working in the Thoroughbred horse racing industry, he trained for various owners including the prominent stables of Vera S. Bragg and J. Shirley Riley. However, he is best known for his time with Stoner Creek Stud training the horses for its owners, John & Fannie Hertz.

Beginning in September 1940 Don Cameron trained Challedon for owner William L. Brann and won the Pimlico Special and Havre de Grace Handicap. He left Brann's employ in February 1941 and the horse's training was taken over by L. T. (Whitey) Whitehill.

== Count Fleet and the Triple Crown ==
In 1939, he hired jockey Johnny Longden to ride the horses owned by Vera S. Bragg and Fannie Hertz. With Longden riding Count Fleet in all his races, in 1942 Don Cameron conditioned Mrs. Hertz's two-year-old colt to U.S. Champion 2-Yr-Old Colt honors. The following year the colt won the Kentucky Derby, Preakness Stakes and Belmont Stakes to become only the 6th U.S. Triple Crown Champion in the history of the American Classic Races. Cameron would see his colt voted the 1943 American Horse of the Year, the most prestigious honor for Thoroughbred runners in the United States.

Among Cameron's other important horses was Vulcan's Forge, whose conditioning he took over in 1949 from U.S. Racing Hall of fame trainer, Syl Veitch. That year, Cameron saddled Vulcan's Forge to major wins in California's richest race, the Santa Anita Handicap and on the East Coast, the Suburban Handicap at New York's Belmont Park.

In 1950, Don Cameron's trainee, Miche, notably won the La Sorpresa Handicap at Santa Anita Park, ending Citation's sixteen-race win streak

Don Cameron died on July 11, 1952, at age fifty-eight from a coronary thrombosis.
