= Eddie Hayward =

American horse trainer and jockey

Personal information
- Born: February 13, 1903 Brighton, Ontario, Canada
- Died: January 1983 (aged 79); Franklin Square, New York, United States
- Occupation: Jockey / Trainer

Horse racing career
- Sport: Horse racing

Major racing wins
- Whittier Park Handicap (1928); Metropolitan Handicap (1938); American Legion Handicap (1942); Inglewood Handicap (1950); Sysonby Handicap (1951); Derby Trial Stakes (1953); Garden State Stakes (1953); Saratoga Special Stakes (1953); Coaching Club American Oaks (1954); Flamingo Stakes (1954); Hibiscus Stakes (1954); Correction Handicap (1960); Distaff Handicap (1960); Vagrancy Handicap (1960); Fall Highweight Handicap (1962); Discovery Handicap (1973); Roamer Handicap (1973) American Classic Race wins: Kentucky Derby (1953)

Significant horses
- Dark Star, Forego, Miche, Turn-To

Edward C. Hayward (February 13, 1903 – January, 1983) was a Canadian-born trainer in American Thoroughbred horse racing, best known for winning the 1953 Kentucky Derby in which his colt Dark Star defeated Native Dancer.

== Racing career ==
A native of Brighton, Ontario, he began his career as a jockey. In 1918 he was galloping horses at a racetrack in Saskatchewan where he would ride his first winner before leaving to compete in Spokane, Washington. He rode until around 1923 and after learning the art of horse conditioning for racing, in the latter part of the decade embarked on a training career. His first client was James Norris, owner of the Detroit Red Wings of the National Hockey League, for whom he would win the 1938 Metropolitan Handicap with Danger Point. In 1928, Hayward returned temporarily to Canada where he won the Whittier Park Handicap. In 1940, Hayward trained a horse in California for Canadian-born actor Victor Jory and later was hired by Muriel Vanderbilt Adams for whom he trained Miche.

=== 1953 Derby Trial and Kentucky Derby ===
Hayward moved to the East Coast of the United States in late 1952 to take over as head trainer for Harry Gugenheim's Cain Hoy Stable. Besides Dark Star, among the other Cain Hoy horses he trained were Battle Morn and Armageddon. In 1953, he joined two others as the only trainers to ever win the Derby Trial Stakes and the Kentucky Derby with the same horse. The feat had been accomplished by Hanly Webb in 1924 with Black Gold and by Ben A. Jones, who did it twice, first with Citation in 1948 and then with Hill Gail in 1952. In 1958, Jimmy Jones, son of Ben, became the fourth and last to do it when he won the two races with Tim Tam.

As at 2011, Hayward's win with Dark Star in the Kentucky Derby remains one of the biggest upsets in the history of the race. The loss by Native Dancer was the only one of his twenty-two race career that saw the horse inducted into the National Museum of Racing and Hall of Fame. In the second leg of the U.S. Triple Crown, Dark Star suffered a bowed tendon in the Preakness Stakes and finished fifth. The injury ended his racing career, and he was retired to stud.

Hayward resigned from Cain Hoy Stable in December 1954 and took over as trainer for a racing partnership headed by Dallas Cowboys owner Clint Murchison. He added to his clientele with the Circle M Farm of Edward S. Moore and in the 1970s took over training of future Hall of Fame inductee Forego for the Lazy F Ranch stable when Sherrill Ward fell seriously ill in 1975.

Living in Franklin Square, New York, Hayward died in 1983 at age seventy-nine.
