= Miche (horse) =

Argentine-bred Thoroughbred racehorse

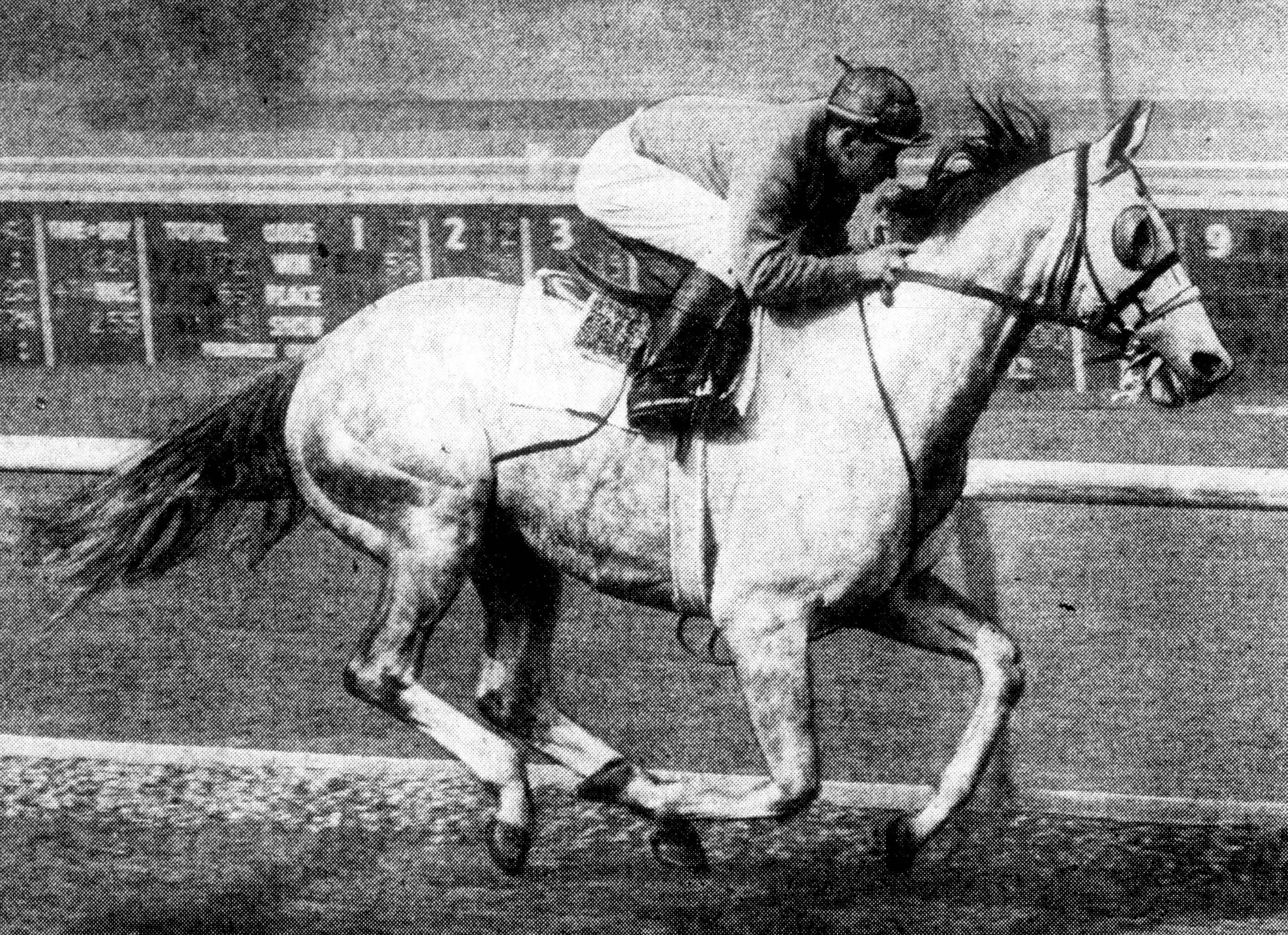
- Miche, circa 1950
- Sire: Michel
- Grandsire: Parwiz
- Dam: Pura Suerte
- Damsire: Cocles
- Sex: Stallion
- Foaled: 1945
- Country: Argentina
- Colour: Gray
- Breeder: P. Eyherabide & Co.
- Owner: Muriel Vanderbilt Adams
- Trainer: Eddie Hayward; Don Cameron (1952)
- Record: 51: 15-9-9
- Earnings: US$235,185

Major wins
- Tanforan Handicap (1949); Inglewood Handicap (1950); Sysonby Handicap (1951); Santa Anita Handicap (1952)

Miche (foaled in 1945) was an Argentine Thoroughbred racehorse who in 1948 was imported to the United States, where he successfully competed at the top levels of racing. He was raced from a base in California by Muriel Vanderbilt Adams, the daughter of William and Virginia Vanderbilt, both of whom were heavily involved in the sport.

Trained by Eddie Hayward for the majority of his career, in 1949 Miche equaled the Hollywood Park track record for 7 furlongs on dirt with a time of 1:21 4/5. In 1952, Eddie Hayward returned to train on the East Coast, and Don Cameron took over Miche's race conditioning. Cameron had trained Count Fleet to his U.S. Triple Crown win in 1943. Under his handling, Miche set a track record at Tanforan Racetrack of 2:02 1/5 for 1 1/4 miles on dirt and earned the most important win of his career when he was awarded first place in the Santa Anita Handicap following the disqualification of Intent for interference.

On October 3, 1952, The New York Times reported that owner Muriel Adams announced Miche's retirement as a result of a leg injury sustained while competing in the 1952 Sysonby Handicap at Belmont Park in New York.

Miche was very modestly successful as a sire. His best runner was probably Hymient, who won several stakes races.
