= Henry Moreno =

American jockey

Henry E. Moreno
Personal information
- Born: May 12, 1930
- Died: February 1, 2007 (aged 77)
- Occupation: Jockey

Horse racing career
- Sport: Horse racing

Major racing wins
- Del Mar Debutante Stakes (1952); Hollywood Derby (1952); Vanity Handicap (1952); Derby Trial Stakes (1953); Garden State Stakes (1953); Saratoga Special Stakes (1953); Flamingo Stakes (1954); Lafayette Stakes (1954); Champagne Stakes (1954, 1960); Coaching Club American Oaks (1954); Beldame Stakes (1955); Blue Grass Stakes (1955); Kentucky Oaks (1955); Vagrancy Handicap (1955); Acorn Stakes (1956); Santa Anita Derby (1957); Santa Barbara Handicap (1958); Alabama Stakes (1959); Gazelle Stakes (1959,1960); Gallorette Handicap (1959); Hawthorne Gold Cup Handicap (1959); San Gabriel Handicap (1959); Bay Shore Stakes (1960); Paumonok Handicap (1960); American Handicap (1962); Hollywood Gold Cup (1962); Metropolitan Handicap (1964); Hawthorne Juvenile Stakes (1965); Stars and Stripes Handicap (1968); Fairmount Derby (1969); Carleton F. Burke Handicap (1978); Del Mar Handicap (1978); Fantasy Stakes (1978) American Classic Race wins: Kentucky Derby (1953)

Significant horses
- A Gleam, Dark Star, Sir William, Two Lea, Turn-To, Lalun, Prove It, Racing Fool

Henry E. "Hank" Moreno (May 12, 1930 - February 1, 2007) was a Thoroughbred horse racing jockey.

Moreno's most important win for Harry F. Guggenheim's stable came in the 1953 Kentucky Derby when he rode Dark Star to victory over future the Hall of Fame colt, Native Dancer.

Henry Moreno rode a number of stakes race winners for Cain Hoy Stable including Kentucky Oaks and Beldame Stakes winner, Lalun and the prized Garden State Stakes for juvenile horses aboard Turn-To. However, Moreno's most important win for Harry F. Guggenheim's stable came in the 1953 Kentucky Derby when he rode Dark Star to victory over future the Hall of Fame colt, Native Dancer. Of his three mounts in the Preakness Stakes, Moreno's best result was aboard The Scoundrel in 1964 when he had a second-place finish behind Northern Dancer.

In his later years he lived in Hemet, California and battled pancreatic cancer and in 2007 died at age 77 at Florence, Oregon.
