= Dark Star (horse) =

American-bred Thoroughbred racehorse

- Sire: Royal Gem
- Grandsire: Dhoti
- Dam: Isolde
- Damsire: Bull Dog
- Sex: Stallion
- Foaled: 1950
- Country: United States
- Colour: Brown
- Breeder: Warner L. Jones Jr.
- Owner: Cain Hoy Stable
- Trainer: Moody Jolley; Eddie Hayward (at age 3)
- Record: 13: 6-2-2
- Earnings: $131,337

Major wins
- Derby Trial (1953); Kentucky Derby (1953)
- Last updated on December 16, 2006

Dark Star (April 4, 1950 – October 21, 1972) was an American thoroughbred racehorse and sire. During his racing career he won six races, most notably the 1953 Kentucky Derby, in which he defeated Native Dancer.

== Background ==
Dark Star was sired by Royal Gem (also known as Royal Gem II), an Australian stallion who was imported to the United States to stand at Hermitage Stud in Kentucky. As a yearling, Dark Star was consigned to the Keeneland sales, where he was bought for $6,500 by Harry Frank Guggenheim. He raced in the colors of Guggenheim's Cain Hoy Stable.

== Racing career ==
=== 1952: two-year-old season ===
As a two-year-old, Dark Star worked impressively but seemed unable to reproduce his form on the track. He started his racing career early, running at Hialeah February and winning a three-furlong race there in early March. In his biggest test, he finished third to Native Dancer in the Belmont Futurity in September and ran unplaced in the Champagne Stakes.

=== 1953: three-year-old season ===
In February 1953, Dark Star won a sprint race at Hialeah, then lost to Money Broker in the Florida Derby in March. On the Tuesday before the Kentucky Derby, Dark Star reversed his earlier form by beating Money Broker by four lengths in the Derby Trial at Churchill Downs. He covered the one mile distance in a near-record time of 1:36.00 to confirm his place in the Derby field.

In the Derby on May 2, Dark Star started at odds of 25/1, with Native Dancer, unbeaten in eleven races, going off the 3/5 favourite. Apart from the crowd at the track, the race attracted a huge television audience, with three-quarters of American viewers tuning in to the coverage. Dark Star broke quickly from a wide draw and was sent into the lead at the first turn by his twenty-three-year-old jockey Hank Moreno, staying clear of the "bumping and pushing" further back in the field, in which the favorite was badly affected. As the field turned into the straight, Dark Star broke away from his nearest challenger, the Eddie Arcaro-ridden Correspondent, to open a clear lead. Native Dancer produced a powerful late run, but Dark Star held on to win by a head. The winning time was 2:02.0. After the race, Moreno confessed to being surprised by Dark Star's effort, saying that he had "hoped to run third".

In the book "Horse Racing's Top 100 Moments" by the staff of Blood-Horse Publications, Dark Star's defeat of Native Dancer was ranked number 21.

Before the Preakness Stakes, Dark Star ran in a prep race at Pimlico on May 14, in which he was beaten by Royal Bay Gem, but his rematch with Native Dancer in the second leg of the Triple Crown was nevertheless much anticipated. In the Preakness Stakes, Dark Star led in the early stages and appeared to be going well until three-eighths of a mile from the finish, when he weakened abruptly and finished fifth in to Native Dancer. It was subsequently revealed that Dark Star had sustained a serious tendon injury to his right foreleg, which ended his racing career.

== Stud record ==
Dark Star retired to stand at stud in the United States. In 1967, he was sold to Haras du Bois-Roussel in Alençon, France. His most notable offspring was the Prix de Diane winner Gazala, who became an outstanding broodmare, producing Youth (Prix du Jockey Club, sire of Teenoso), Gonzales (Irish St Leger) and Mississippian (Grand Critérium). Dark Star was also the sire of My Dad George and Hidden Treasure, the 1961 Canadian Horse of the Year.

== Pedigree ==
Pedigree of Dark Star (USA), brown stallion, 1950
Sire Royal Gem (AUS) 1942	Dhoti; 1936	Dastur	Solario
Sire Royal Gem (AUS) 1942	Dhoti; 1936	Dastur	Friar's Daughter
Sire Royal Gem (AUS) 1942	Dhoti; 1936	Tricky Aunt	Son in Law*
Sire Royal Gem (AUS) 1942	Dhoti; 1936	Tricky Aunt	Rectify
Sire Royal Gem (AUS) 1942	French Gem; 1935	Beau Fils	Son-in-Law*
Sire Royal Gem (AUS) 1942	French Gem; 1935	Beau Fils	Vivid
Sire Royal Gem (AUS) 1942	French Gem; 1935	Fission	Chrysolaus
Sire Royal Gem (AUS) 1942	French Gem; 1935	Fission	Hippolyte
Dam Isolde (USA) 1938	Bull Dog; 1927	Teddy	Ajax
Dam Isolde (USA) 1938	Bull Dog; 1927	Teddy	Rondeaux
Dam Isolde (USA) 1938	Bull Dog; 1927	Plucky Liege	Spearmint
Dam Isolde (USA) 1938	Bull Dog; 1927	Plucky Liege	Concertina
Dam Isolde (USA) 1938	Fiji; 1931	Bostonian	Broomstick
Dam Isolde (USA) 1938	Fiji; 1931	Bostonian	Yankee Maid
Dam Isolde (USA) 1938	Fiji; 1931	O Girl	Ormondale
Dam Isolde (USA) 1938	Fiji; 1931	O Girl	Our Filly (Family: 3n)

* Dark Star is inbred 4S x 4S to the stallion Son-in-Law, meaning that he appears fourth generation twice on the sire side of his pedigree.
