= Bobby Ussery =

American jockey (1935–2023)

Personal information
- Born: September 3, 1935 Vian, Oklahoma, U.S.
- Died: November 16, 2023 (aged 88) Hollywood, Florida, U.S.
- Occupation: Jockey

Horse racing career
- Sport: Horse racing
- Career wins: 3,611

Major racing wins
- Canadian International Stakes (1955); Narragansett Special (1955); Champlain Handicap (1956); Palm Beach Handicap (1956, 1962, 1964); Great American Stakes (1957, 1960); Manhattan Handicap (1957, 1967); Saratoga Handicap (1957); Sport Page Handicap (1957); Whitney Handicap (1957); Alabama Stakes (1958); American Legion Handicap (1958); Cowdin Stakes (1958); Royal Palm Handicap (1958); Travers Stakes (1958); Jamaica Handicap (1959); Sysonby Handicap (1959); Toboggan Handicap (1959); Bahamas Stakes (1960); Flamingo Stakes (1960); Florida Derby (1960); Hopeful Stakes (1960); Tremont Stakes (1960, 1961); Youthful Stakes (1960, 1964); Black-Eyed Susan Stakes (1961); Black Helen Handicap (1961); Gotham Stakes (1961, 1965); Fall Highweight Handicap (1961); Juvenile Stakes (1961, 1964); Mother Goose Stakes (1961); Coaching Club American Oaks (1962); Matron Stakes (1962, 1964); Royal Palm Handicap (1962); Lawrence Realization Stakes (1963); Roamer Handicap (1963, 1966); Brooklyn Handicap (1963, 1971); Withers Stakes (1964, 1965); Edgemere Handicap (1965); Stuyvesant Handicap (1965); Wood Memorial Stakes (1965, 1968); Gardenia Stakes (1966, 1967); Morris Handicap (1966); Saratoga Special Stakes (1966); Stymie Handicap (1966); Carter Handicap (1969, 1970); Comely Stakes (1970) Canadian Classic Race wins: Queen's Plate (1959) American Classic Race wins: Kentucky Derby (1967); Preakness Stakes (1960)

Honors
- United States Racing Hall of Fame (1980); Oklahoma Horse Racing Hall of Fame (2011)

Significant horses
- Bally Ache, Dancer's Image, Hail To Reason, New Providence, Proud Clarion
- Updated on December 12, 2021

Robert Nelson Ussery (September 3, 1935 – November 16, 2023) was an American Thoroughbred horse racing hall of fame jockey. His first race as a professional jockey came at Fair Grounds Race Course in New Orleans on November 22, 1951, where he rode Reticule to victory in the Thanksgiving Handicap. By the end of the decade, he had won the Travers, Whitney and Alabama Stakes.

== Career ==
Riding Windfields Farm's colt New Providence, in 1959 he won Canada's most prestigious race, the Queen's Plate. The horse went on to win the Canadian Triple Crown, although Avelino Gomez took the mount for the final two legs.

Ussery's best finish in the Belmont Stakes was in 1959 aboard the colt Bagdad. In 1960, he won the Hopeful Stakes aboard that year's Eclipse Award 2-year-old champion, Hail To Reason. That same year, he rode Bally Ache to victory in the Florida Derby and the Flamingo Stakes en route to a second-place finish in the Kentucky Derby and then a win in the Preakness Stakes.

In 1967, Ussery won the Kentucky Derby on Proud Clarion and finished first in 1968 aboard Dancer's Image. However, phenylbutazone, a substance banned in Kentucky at that time but later sanctioned after it was proven not to affect a horse's performance, was found in Dancer's Image's post-race urine test. Dancer's Image was thus disqualified and placed last.

Ussery was so noted for guiding horses to the outside of the track, near the crown, then diving toward the rail and opening them up on the far turn at Aqueduct Race Track that it was soon dubbed "Ussery's Alley", specifically for riding a horse on the far outside.

Ussery retired in 1974 with 3,611 race wins. In 1980, he was inducted into the National Museum of Racing and Hall of Fame. In 2011, he was inducted into the Oklahoma Horse Racing Hall of Fame.

== Death ==
Ussery died on November 16, 2023, of heart failure at the age of 88.
