= Proud Clarion =

American-bred Thoroughbred racehorse

- Sire: Hail To Reason
- Grandsire: Turn-To
- Dam: Breath O'Morn
- Damsire: Djeddah
- Sex: Stallion
- Foaled: January 19, 1964
- Died: December 17, 1981 (aged 17)
- Country: United States
- Colour: Bay
- Breeder: John W. Galbreath
- Owner: Darby Dan Farm
- Trainer: Loyd Gentry, Jr.
- Record: 25: 6-4-2
- Earnings: $218,730

Major wins
- Roamer Handicap (1967); Triple Crown wins: Kentucky Derby (1967)
- Last updated on June 11, 2007

Proud Clarion (January 19, 1964 – December 17, 1981) was an American Thoroughbred racehorse best known for winning the 1967 Kentucky Derby.

== Background ==
Owned and bred by John W. Galbreath, Proud Clarion was foaled at his Darby Dan Farm in Lexington, Kentucky. His sire was Hail To Reason, the U.S. Champion Two-Year-Old Colt for 1960, and his grandsire was Royal Charger, a son of the great Nearco. Out of the mare Breath O'Morn, Proud Clarion's damsire was Djeddah, a major stakes winner in England who in turn was a son of the French champion and 1942 Prix de l'Arc de Triomphe winner, Djebel.

== Racing career ==
Racing at age two for trainer Loyd Gentry, Jr., Proud Clarion showed little of what his pedigree promised. Out of three starts, his best result was a third in a minor race. He finished his two-year-old season with earnings of just $805. As a three-year-old, he won a few sprint races then in the immediate lead-up to the 1967 Kentucky Derby, he ran second to Diplomat Way in the Blue Grass Stakes.

Ridden by Bobby Ussery in the Derby, Proud Clarion was given little consideration and was sent off by bettors at more than 30:1 odds. The fourteen-horse field included Diplomat Way, Ruken, who had won California's Santa Anita Derby and was the bettors second choice, plus the overwhelming favorite, Wood Memorial Stakes winner Damascus.

Leaving the starting gate from post position seven, Proud Clarion raced ninth near the back in a pack of horses until close to the ¾ mile pole when jockey Bobby Ussery made a move. By the mile pole he was sitting fifth then in the homestretch accelerated through an opening between Damascus and Diplomat Way. He caught front-runner Barbs Delight then raced on to win by a length in the third-fastest time in the Derby's history to that point.

Proud Clarion finished third in the Preakness Stakes and then fourth in the Belmont to winner Damascus. He won six of his thirteen starts in 1967, with his only other significant stakes win coming in the Roamer Handicap at Aqueduct Racetrack in which he set a new track record of 1:55 flat for a mile and three-sixteenths. He returned to race at age four in 1968, starting nine times out of which his best was two second-place finishes.

== Stud record ==
Retired to stud duty at his owners Darby Dan Farm, Proud Clarion met with some success, siring at least 30 winners of stakes races including Marlboro Cup winner, Proud Birdie. He died in 1981 at age seventeen at Spendthrift Farm in Lexington, Kentucky and is buried in their equine cemetery.

== Pedigree ==
Pedigree of Proud Clarion (USA), bay stallion, 1964
| Sire Hail To Reason (USA) 1958 | Turn-To (GB); 1951 | Royal Charger | Nearco |
| Sire Hail To Reason (USA) 1958 | Turn-To (GB); 1951 | Royal Charger | Sun Princess |
| Sire Hail To Reason (USA) 1958 | Turn-To (GB); 1951 | Source Sucree | Admiral Drake |
| Sire Hail To Reason (USA) 1958 | Turn-To (GB); 1951 | Source Sucree | Lavendula |
| Sire Hail To Reason (USA) 1958 | Nothirdchance (USA); 1948 | Blue Swords | Blue Larkspur |
| Sire Hail To Reason (USA) 1958 | Nothirdchance (USA); 1948 | Blue Swords | Flaming Swords |
| Sire Hail To Reason (USA) 1958 | Nothirdchance (USA); 1948 | Galla Colours | Sir Gallahad |
| Sire Hail To Reason (USA) 1958 | Nothirdchance (USA); 1948 | Galla Colours | Rouge et Noir |
| Dam Breath o'Morn (USA) 1952 | Djeddah (FR); 1945 | Djebel | Tourbillon |
| Dam Breath o'Morn (USA) 1952 | Djeddah (FR); 1945 | Djebel | Loika |
| Dam Breath o'Morn (USA) 1952 | Djeddah (FR); 1945 | Djezima | Asterus |
| Dam Breath o'Morn (USA) 1952 | Djeddah (FR); 1945 | Djezima | Heldifann |
| Dam Breath o'Morn (USA) 1952 | Darby Dunedin (USA); 1942 | Blenheim | Blandford |
| Dam Breath o'Morn (USA) 1952 | Darby Dunedin (USA); 1942 | Blenheim | Malva |
| Dam Breath o'Morn (USA) 1952 | Darby Dunedin (USA); 1942 | Ethel Deal | Peter Pan |
| Dam Breath o'Morn (USA) 1952 | Darby Dunedin (USA); 1942 | Ethel Deal | Royale Amante (Family 1-t) |
