= Native Dancer =

American-bred Thoroughbred racehorse

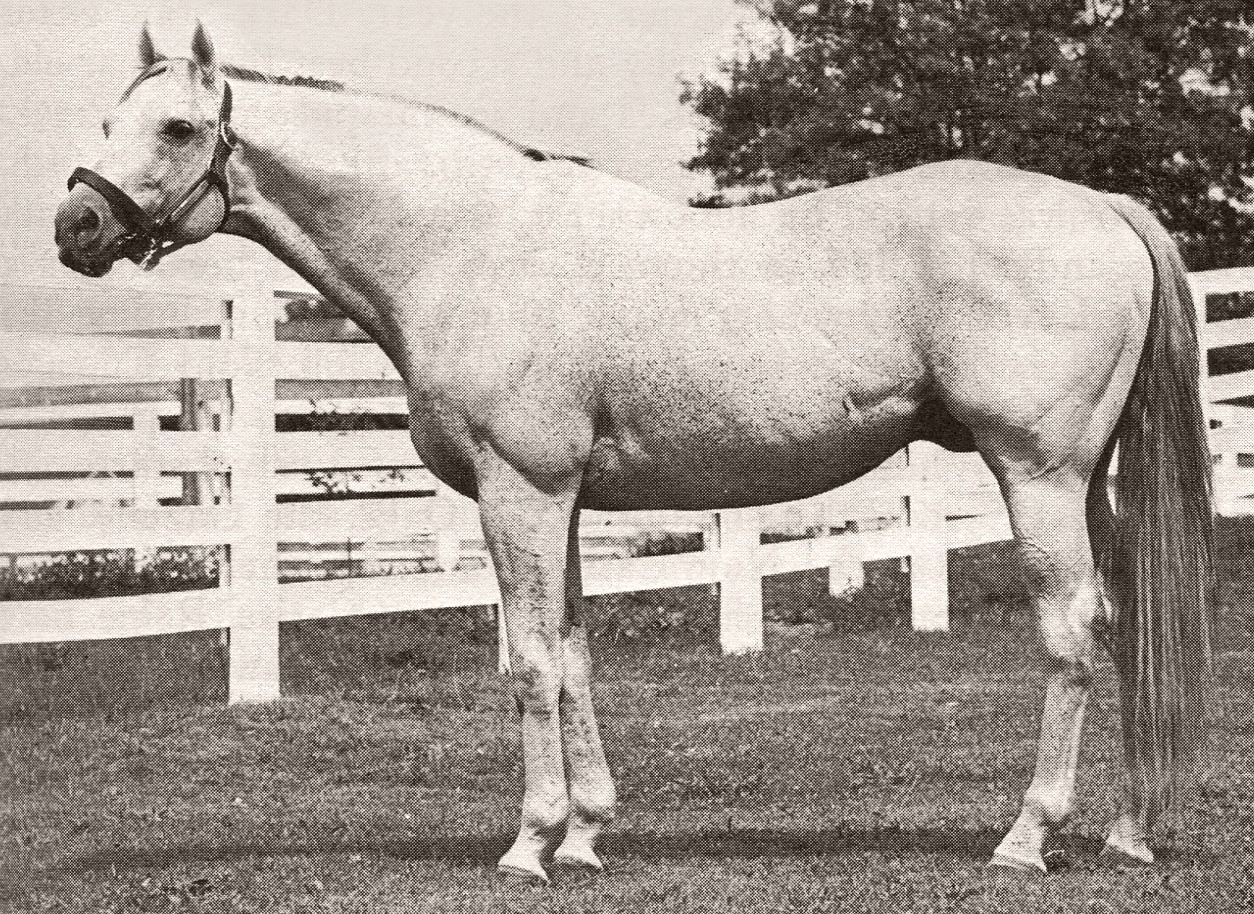
- Native Dancer, the Gray Ghost
- Sire: Polynesian
- Grandsire: Unbreakable
- Dam: Geisha
- Damsire: Discovery
- Sex: Stallion
- Foaled: March 27, 1950
- Died: November 16, 1967 (aged 17)
- Country: United States
- Colour: Gray
- Breeder: Alfred G. Vanderbilt II
- Owner: Alfred G. Vanderbilt II; Racing colors: Cerise, white diamonds, cerise, sleeves, white cap.
- Trainer: William C. Winfrey
- Jockey: Eric Guerin
- Record: 22: 21-1-0
- Earnings: $785,240

Major wins
- Youthful Stakes (1952); Flash Stakes (1952); Saratoga Special Stakes (1952); Grand Union Hotel Stakes (1952); Hopeful Stakes (1952); Futurity Stakes (1952); East View Stakes (1952); Gotham Stakes (1953); Wood Memorial (1953); Withers Stakes (1953); Dwyer Stakes (1953); Arlington Classic (1953); Travers Stakes (1953); American Derby (1953); Metropolitan Handicap (1954) American Classic Race wins: Preakness Stakes (1953); Belmont Stakes (1953)

Awards
- American Champion Two-Year-Old Colt (1952); TSB/TRA Horse of the Year (1952); American Champion Three-Year-Old Male Horse (1953); American Champion Older Male Horse (1954); American Horse of the Year (1954)

Honours
- U.S. Racing Hall of Fame (1963); Maryland State Athletic Hall of Fame (2014) #7 - Top 100 U.S. Racehorses of the 20th Century; Statue at Centennial Park in Saratoga Springs

Native Dancer (March 27, 1950 – November 16, 1967), nicknamed the Gray Ghost, was one of the most celebrated and accomplished Thoroughbred racehorses in American history and was the first horse made famous through the medium of television. He was a champion in each of his three years of racing, and was inducted into the National Museum of Racing and Hall of Fame in 1963. In the Blood-Horse magazine List of the Top 100 U.S. Racehorses of the 20th Century, he was ranked seventh and in the Associated Press rankings of the greatest racehorses of the 20th century, he was ranked #3, tied with Citation, behind only Man o' War and Secretariat.

As a two-year-old, he was undefeated in his nine starts and was voted Horse of the Year in two of three major industry polls – One Count won the other. At age three, he suffered the sole defeat in his career in the 1953 Kentucky Derby, but rebounded to win the Preakness, Belmont and Travers Stakes. He made only three starts at age four before being retired due to injury, but was still named American Horse of the Year.

Retired to stud in 1955, he became a sire whose offspring included champion Raise A Native and dual Classic winner Kauai King. Also a broodmare sire, Native Dancer is now "all but universal" in modern pedigrees.

== Background ==
Native Dancer was bred by Alfred G. Vanderbilt Jr. and raced for him as a homebred. He was foaled at Scott Farm near Lexington, Kentucky but was raised at Vanderbilt's Sagamore Farm in Glyndon, Maryland, and is generally considered a Maryland-bred. Native Dancer was sired by the 1945 Preakness Stakes winner, Polynesian, who was otherwise known as a sprinter. His dam Geisha won only once in her eleven starts and produced no other stakes winners, though her daughter Orientation became a multiple stakes producer. Geisha was sired by Discovery, an outstanding distance horse and weight-carrier. Discovery was also the broodmare sire of leading sire Bold Ruler.

Native Dancer inherited his gray coat, then quite rare in Thoroughbreds, through the female line to his fourth dam, La Grisette, a daughter of Roi Herode. Roi Herode was also the sire of The Tetrarch, the "spotted wonder". Most modern gray Thoroughbreds can trace their coat to Roi Herode and his grandsire Le Sancy.

From his earliest days, Native Dancer was considered "an extremely nice colt". Ralph Kerchaval, the manager of Sagamore Farm, said that "he was playful, big and rough, but you could do anything with him." At maturity, Native Dancer stood 16.3 hands (67 inches, 170 cm) at the withers. According to Charles Hatton of the Daily Racing Form, Native Dancer looked like a sprinter from the front and a stayer from the back. He was a massive horse with "suspicious-looking ankles". His pastern bones were short and somewhat too upright, making him more vulnerable to injury. He had a notably long stride but his action was hard and pounding. Trainer Bill Winfrey said the colt was "a regular Jekyll and Hyde" – ordinarily quiet and tractable but with a playful streak that could make him a handful.

== Racing record ==
=== 1952: two-year-old campaign ===
In his first season of racing, Native Dancer won all nine starts. He was voted the American Champion Two-Year-Old Colt for 1952, with two of the three major polls also naming him Horse of the Year.

Native Dancer made his first start on April 19, 1952, in a maiden race at Jamaica Racetrack over five furlongs. Going off at odds of 7-5 in a field of nine, he settled into fourth place down the backstretch, then started a strong drive in the middle of the turn to win by 4 1/2 lengths. Just four days later, he returned in the Youthful Stakes where he was made the odds-on favorite in a field of twelve. He pressed a fast early pace set by Retrouve then pulled away in the stretch to win by six lengths. The victory established the colt as the early leader of the two-year-old division.

Native Dancer was then given a layoff to recover from sore shins. He returned to racing on the opening day of Saratoga Race Course, August 4, in the Flash Stakes over 5 1/2 furlongs. Again the odds-on favorite, he was ridden hard around the turn before drawing away in the stretch to win by 2 1/4 lengths. On August 16, he entered the Saratoga Special, noteworthy at the time for having a winner-takes-all purse of $17,000. He won by 3 1/2 lengths over a muddy track. He followed up by winning the Grand Union Hotel Stakes on August 23, defeating two previously undefeated colts – Tahitian King and Lafango. He won by 3 1/2 lengths while running the fastest six furlongs at that year's Saratoga meeting, 1:11 1/5. He completed his dominance at Saratoga by winning the Hopeful Stakes on the meeting's closing day, August 31. Jockey Eric Guerin said, "I never had a second of worry. He took off when I asked him to."

Native Dancer made his next start on September 22 at Belmont Park in a six-furlong special weight race. He broke in fifth place in the field of six, then steadily improved his position to win by 1 1/4 lengths. Just five days later, he returned in the Belmont Futurity, then one of the most prestigious races for two-year-olds in the United States. He turned in a "superlative performance" to win while tying the world record for 6 1/2 furlongs, 1:14 2/5. He had been hard pressed though – Guerin admitted that he had thought the colt was beaten with an eighth of a mile remaining when he was headed by Tahitian King. But Native Dancer responded in the final furlong to open a 2 1/4 lead advantage. He became the first gray horse to win the race.

Native Dancer made his final start as a two-year-old in the East View Stakes at Jamaica on October 22 over a distance of 1 1/16 miles. He won with ease, "wiggling his ears and having much fun" as he crossed the finish line 1 1/2 lengths ahead of Laffango, who had earlier won the Champagne Stakes. Guerin confirmed that Native Dancer had eased himself after taking the lead at the head of the stretch. "He's not going to do any more than you make him do," he said. "I never hit him with the whip."

Native Dancer finished the year with nine wins, seven of them in stakes races, and earnings of $230,245, then a record for a two-year-old. He had been the odds-on favorite in all but his first start. He was named the American Champion Two-Year-Old. The Thoroughbred Racing Association also named him the American Horse of the Year, a "break with tradition" as two-year-olds are not normally considered for the award since they typically only race against horses of the same age and competition is not considered as deep. The Turf and Sports Digest, polling 176 sportswriters, also awarded him Horse of the Year honors However, the Daily Racing Form voted instead for One Count, winner of the Belmont and Jockey Club Gold Cup.

He was assigned 130 pounds in the Experimental Free Handicap, seven pounds ahead of Laffango and Tahitian King.

=== 1953: three-year-old campaign ===
In his three-year-old campaign, Native Dancer received a great deal of media attention leading up to the 1953 Kentucky Derby. He won the Gotham Stakes and the prestigious Wood Memorial, but in the 1953 Kentucky Derby, he lost for the only time in his career. Native Dancer subsequently won the Preakness, Belmont and Travers Stakes, a feat accomplished until then only by Duke of Magenta, Grenada, Man o' War and Whirlaway. Native Dancer finished the season with nine wins (all of them stakes races) from ten starts and was named Champion Three-Year-Old Colt.

==== Preparing for the Triple Crown ====
Native Dancer was given some time off at the end of his two-year-old campaign, then resumed training in California at Santa Anita Racetrack. He gave his connections a scare in late January when he threw his exercise rider after stumbling to his knees following a workout. He then bolted and was loose for five minutes, running into the paddock where he jumped some benches and ran through flower beds. When he tangled a leg in the reins, he finally slowed down enough to be recaptured. No serious damage was done.

He was shipped to New York in mid-March and made his first start of the year in the Gotham Stakes on April 18. As the race attracted 18 entries, it was run in two divisions, with Native Dancer the odds-on favorite is his division and Laffango the favorite in the second division. He raced in mid-pack during the early part of the race, then "did a bit of hustling" turning into the stretch to take the lead. He won under a hand ride by two lengths. Sportswriter George Ryall wrote, "Any question in your mind about Native Dancer is easy to answer; he's as good as you thought."

Native Dancer extended his winning streak to eleven in the Wood Memorial on April 25. Going off as the 1-10 favorite, he was restrained until the top of the stretch, then "whizzed away" from his rivals to win by 4 1/2 lengths over Tahitian King.

The Gotham and Wood Memorial were both televised by NBC. Native Dancer's gray coat helped him stand out on the black and white screens of the day, helping him to become the first TV star of the sport.

==== Kentucky Derby ====
The 1953 Kentucky Derby, held on May 2, was the sole loss of Native Dancer's career. He dominated news coverage leading up to the race and was the odds-on favorite. His main rival was supposed to have been Correspondent, who had won three straight, including the Blue Grass Stakes in which he set a track record. Dark Star won the Derby Trial a few days before the Derby but was largely dismissed by the bettors at odds of 25-1.

Dark Star, starting from the next-to-outside post position, went to the early lead and moved over to the rail. Native Dancer was eighth as they went down the stretch for the first time and was then bumped by longshot Money Maker as they entered the first turn. He started to make up ground on the final turn while racing wide, then was moved to the inside as he entered the stretch in third place. Still nearly three lengths behind, Guerin went to the whip and Native Dancer gradually closed ground. Dark Star held his position on the rail so Native Dancer was swung to the outside. He continued to edge closer with each stride but fell just short, losing by a head.

In addition to Native Dancer being fouled on the first turn, Guerin commented after the race that the colt had not cared for the track. However, Guerin was given a large share of the blame for the loss because of his racing tactics. One reporter wrote, "he took that colt everywhere on the track except the ladies' room." Native Dancer was farther back than usual in the early part of the race, which resulted in more traffic problems. Instead of mounting a single drive on the outside, Guerin changed position several times in the final quarter of a mile, costing the colt momentum. Guerin later explained, "He just didn't want to run early. And when he didn't want to run, he didn't run."

Time magazine later reported, "When he lost the Kentucky Derby by a head, thousands turned from their TV screens in sorrow, a few in tears." As a measure of Native Dancer's growing fame, Time added, "Hundreds of people, old and young, have sent him letters and greeting cards. Little girls have organized fan clubs in his name."

Native Dancer made his next start in the Withers Stakes on May 16 at Belmont Park. Facing only two other horses, he went off as the 1-20 favorite (the legal minimum) with win-only betting allowed. Native Dancer stumbled when leaving the starting gate but quickly recovered. He took a narrow lead about three furlongs from the finish and opened a significant margin around the eighth pole when Guerin flicked his whip. The final margin was four lengths.

==== Preakness Stakes ====
On May 23, Native Dancer entered the Preakness Stakes as the 1-5 favorite. He again faced Dark Star, who set a fast early pace with Tahitian King to his outside. Native Dancer rated in fourth position on the rail, then started his move on the final turn, splitting between the two front runners. Tahitian King dropped back and eventually finished sixth. At the head of the stretch, Dark Star also gave way, leaving Native Dancer alone on the lead. However, longshot Jamie K then started to close ground rapidly. Guerin went to the whip and Native Dancer responded to win by a neck. Guerin admitted that he had been worried. "When Dark Star stopped, I found myself in the lead a little sooner than I wanted," he said. It was later determined that Dark Star had bowed a tendon during the race: he never raced again.

Besides being the odds-on favorite to win, Native Dancer was so heavily bet to show that it created a minus pool. A show bet pays if the horse finishes in the top three positions, and the legal minimum payout in Maryland at the time was $2.20 for a $2 bet. In order to cover the bets plus the associated taxes, the Maryland Jockey Club had to pay $46,012 (equivalent to $554,000 in 2025) into the pool.

The trophy for the Preakness is the Woodlawn Vase, considered the most valuable trophy in sports with a value of roughly $4 million. Before 1954, the vase itself was given to the winning owner, who kept it for the following year. In 1954 though, Vanderbilt declined to take the original trophy home and instead was given a replica. This set a new tradition where the original Woodlawn Vase is displayed at Pimlico on Preakness day but otherwise resides at the Baltimore Museum of Art. Vanderbilt's replica trophy was sold at auction in 2018 for $100,000.

==== Belmont Stakes ====
Native Dancer was shipped to Belmont Park on May 24. He was walked the next two days to recover from the Preakness, then resumed galloping in the morning. He had several timed workouts in the interval leading up to the Belmont: 5/8 mile in 1:04 on May 30, a mile in 1:44 1/5 on June 1, 3/8 mile in 0:35 3/5 on June 4, 1 1/4 miles in 2:07 on June 5, 1 1/2 miles in 2:38 2/5 on June 9, and 3/4 mile in 1:13 2/5 on June 12. Training practices have since changed dramatically. For example, California Chrome had only one timed workout in the three weeks between the 2014 Preakness and Belmont.

The Belmont Stakes, run on June 13, was a similar race to the Preakness. Native Dancer was again the heavy favorite, and the New York Racing Association did not allow show betting. Ram o' War set the early pace with Native Dancer biding his time in fourth place around the first turn. He was tracked closely by Jamie K and the two horses started their move together on the final turn. Jamie K briefly took the lead as they entered the stretch, but Native Dancer fought back. The two colts dueled for the final furlong, with Native Dancer again prevailing by a neck. He completed the 1 1/2 miles in 2:28 3/5, then the third-fastest running of the race behind Count Fleet and Citation.

"He doesn't win in a flashy sort of a way," said Winfrey, "but he keeps on winning. The Belmont is supposed to be 'the test of the champion' and if it is, he certainly answered the question."

To date, Native Dancer is one of only two "dual Classic winners" to come from the state of Maryland (the other being his son Kauai King, who won the 1966 Kentucky Derby and Preakness).

==== Summer campaign ====
Winfrey planned a busy summer campaign to keep his "lazy so-and-so" active. Native Dancer responded to the challenge, winning the Dwyer, Arlington Classic, Travers and American Derby in quick succession. On July 4, he went off as the 1-20 favorite in the Dwyer Stakes. He took the lead near the head of the stretch, "loafed for a while, exerted himself just a bit in the final yards," and won by 1 3/4 lengths. Carrying 126 pounds, he conceded 10 pounds to each of his four rivals. Even though win-only betting was allowed, Native Dancer still created a small minus pool with a mandatory minimum payout of $2.10 for a $2 bet.

Native Dancer then traveled to Chicago for the Arlington Classic, run over a distance of a mile on a heavy track on July 18. His main rivals were expected to be Jamie K and Van Crosby, who had equaled the track record for seven furlongs in his previous start. Native Dancer carried 128 pounds, conceding six pounds to each of his seven rivals. As expected, Van Crosby set the pace, but was run down by Native Dancer turning into the stretch. Native Dancer continued to draw away and won by nine lengths, the biggest margin of victory of his career. Longshot Sir Mango closed late for second; Jamie K was never a factor.

On August 15, Native Dancer made his next start in the prestigious Travers Stakes at Saratoga. He conceded six pounds to Dictar and twelve to the other three entrants. In the walking ring, he was surrounded by a throng of fans looking for photographs. "It's the way people act when the president goes by in a parade," commented one man. Native Dancer maintained his calm. At the break, Fly Wheel took the early lead but soon dropped back. Guardian II then took over the lead for a few lengths before Dictar took command on the backstretch. Native Dancer bided his time until the 3/16 pole, then powered away to win by 5 1/2 lengths ahead of Dictar. Native Dancer again created minus pools in the win and place betting – show betting was not allowed.

Guerin was suspended for an incident in another race and so missed Native Dancer's next start, the American Derby on August 22. Eddie Arcaro got the mount after the horse he had been scheduled to ride, Jamie K, was withdrawn from the race. Arcaro had previously questioned Native Dancer's credentials, saying, "All the Dancer has done is go around beating the same horses, and most of the time carrying equal weight." He had also questioned the horse's soundness. After galloping him for the first time though, he said, "He's a big, powerful animal. He handled well and had a good disposition."

Travelling back to Chicago, Native Dancer went off as the 1-10 favorite in a field of eight in the American Derby on August 22. He settled near the back of the pack behind a fast early pace set by Sir Mango. Entering the far turn, Native Dancer moved to the outside and into fourth place. Without any urging, he surged forward rounding the far turn and won by two lengths. He completed the 1 1/8-mile race in 1:48 1/5, just one-fifth of a second off the track record. Arcaro believed that the colt could have broken the record if urged. "But he was winning, so I didn't see any point in pressing him," he said. "I let him run his own race." Despite the easy win, Arcaro still believed that Native Dancer had something to prove. He rated Citation as the best horse he had ever ridden.

While Native Dancer was having a noteworthy campaign in the three-year-old division, Tom Fool was enjoying an equally brilliant one as a four-year-old. Racetracks began to alter stakes schedules and purses in hopes of having the two champions face off. For example, Pimlico increased the purse for the Pimlico Special to $50,000. Belmont Park followed suit by increasing the purse and changing the date of the Sysonby Stakes. The hopes for a race between the two died when several bruises were found on Native Dancer's left forefoot after the American Derby. He missed the rest of the year.

Native Dancer was named champion three-year-old by all three major industry polls. However, in the Horse of the Year voting, he came second behind Tom Fool, who had won all ten of his starts.

=== 1954: four-year-old campaign ===
In 1954, Native Dancer won all three races he entered, including the Metropolitan Handicap. His connections hoped to complete the New York Handicap Triple, or perhaps race in Europe on the turf. However, Native Dancer was retired as a result of a recurring foot injury with a record of 21 wins out of 22 lifetime races.

At the beginning of the 1954, Native Dancer was in Maryland where he spent the winter at Sagamore Farm. By February, he was galloping three miles a day. He was then shipped to New York in late March to resume training with Winfrey. He now faced a new challenge: as an older horse, he would be expected to carry high weight imposts in the handicap format pervasive at the time. His connections considered sending him to England to compete in the King George VI and Queen Elizabeth Stakes if the weights got too high. Vanderbilt also discussed entering the colt in the Prix de l'Arc de Triomphe in France.

Native Dancer made his first start of the year in a six-furlong allowance race at Belmont Park on May 7. He went off at odds of 3-20 in a seven-horse field, with Laffango the second choice at 7-1. He raced in mid-pack for the first half-mile, then "took the lead in about three huge strides." After hitting the front near the top of the stretch, Native Dancer relaxed but still won by 1 1/4 lengths.

On May 15, Native Dancer entered the Metropolitan Handicap, in which he was assigned 130 pounds – from 13 to 24 pounds more than his eight rivals. He raced further back than usual, trailing by ten lengths with a half mile remaining and still seven lengths back at the quarter pole. Down the stretch, Guerin hit him four times with the whip. Native Dancer "answered the question" and lengthened his stride. He closed steadily, getting his nose in front with just 30 yards remaining. He completed the mile in 1:35 1/5, then the second-fastest running of the race in its history.

Native Dancer was supposed to make his next start in the Suburban Handicap, then part of the New York Handicap Triple (consisting of the Metropolitan, Suburban and Brooklyn Handicaps). However, after a workout in late May, he showed signs of lameness. Heating was found in the coronet band on his right fore, though X-rays showed nothing. Winfrey originally gave the colt a 50% chance of being fit for the Suburban. Native Dancer worked three furlongs on May 27 but pulled up lame. His connections ruled him out of the Suburban.

Native Dancer finally returned to racing at Saratoga on August 16 in the Oneonta Handicap, run at a distance of seven furlongs over a sloppy track. He was assigned 137 pounds, conceding his rivals from 18 to 30 pounds. Even with the handicap, only two horses faced him so betting was not allowed. He won easily by nine lengths in 1:24 4/5, just 1 4/5 seconds off the track record despite the track conditions.

His next target was the Saratoga Cup but he showed signs of lameness after a 10-furlong workout on August 22, again in the right forefoot. Veterinarian William Wright diagnosed the problem as a "bruised digital cushion, with a secondary inflammation of the bursae between the navicular and coffin bone." He was retired with a record of 21 wins from 22 starts, and earnings of $785,420, then fourth all-time behind Citation, Stymie and Armed.

Native Dancer was voted the United States Horse of the Year for 1954, beating High Gun by 19 votes to 11 in the Daily Racing Form poll and winning the TRA award for the second time. He appeared on the May 31 cover of Time magazine. Many consider the "Gray Ghost of Sagamore" to have been the first Thoroughbred television star and TV Guide ranked him as a top icon of the era".

== Statistics ==
Date	Distance	Race	Track	Odds	Field	Finish	Winning Time	Winning (Losing) Margin	Winner (Runner-Up)	Ref
1952 (2-year-old season)
Apr 19, 1952	5 furlongs	Maiden Special Weight	Jamaica	7-5	9	1	0:59 3/5	4 1/2 lengths	(Putney)	
Apr 23, 1952	5 furlongs	Youthful Stakes	Jamaica	9-10	12	1	0:59 2/5	6 lengths	(Tribe) (Mr. Midnight) (DH)	
Aug 4, 1952	5 1/2 furlongs	Flash Stakes	Saratoga	4-5	7	1	1:06	2 1/4 lengths	(Tiger Skin)	
Aug 16, 1952	6 furlongs	Saratoga Special	Saratoga	7-10	8	1	1:13 1/5	3 1/2 lengths	(Doc Walker)	
Aug 23, 1952	6 furlongs	Grand Union Hotel Stakes	Saratoga	1-2	5	1	1:11 1/5	3 1/2 lengths	(Laffango)	
Aug 30, 1952	6 1/2 furlongs	Hopeful Stakes	Saratoga	1-4	7	1	1:18 4/5	2 lengths	(Tiger Skin)	
Sep 22, 1952	6 furlongs	Special Weight	Belmont Park	2-5	8	1	1:09 3/5	1 1/4 lengths	(Tahitian King)	
Sep 27, 1952	6 1/2 furlongs	Belmont Futurity	Belmont Park	2-5	10	1	1:14 2/5 (Note: tied the world record)	2 1/4 lengths	(Tahitian King)	
Oct 23, 1952	1 1/16 miles	East View Stakes	Jamaica	1-5	6	1	1:44 1/5	1 1/2 lengths	(Laffango)	
1953 (3-year-old season)
Apr 18, 1953	1 1/16 miles	Gotham Stakes	Jamaica	3-20	9	1	1:44 1/5	2 lengths	(Magic Lamp)	
Apr 25, 1953	1 1/8 miles	Wood Memorial	Jamaica	1-10	7	1	1:50 3/5	4 1/2 lengths	(Tahitian King)	
May 2, 1953	1 1/4 miles	Kentucky Derby	Churchill Downs	7-10	11	2	2:02	(head)	Dark Star	
May 16, 1953	1 mile	Withers Stakes	Belmont Park	1-20	3	1	1:36 1/5	4 lengths	(Invigorator)	
May 23, 1953	1 3/16 miles	Preakness Stakes	Pimlico	1-5	7	1	1:57 4/5	neck	(Jamie K.)	
Jun 13, 1953	1 1/2 miles	Belmont Stakes	Belmont Park	9-20	6	1	2:28 3/5	neck	(Jamie K.)	
Jul 4, 1953	1 1/4 miles	Dwyer Stakes	Aqueduct	1-20	5	1	2:05 1/5	1 3/4 lengths	(Dictar)	
Jul 18, 1953	1 mile	Arlington Classic	Arlington Park	7-10	8	1	1:38	9 lengths	(Sir Mango)	
Aug 15, 1953	1 1/4 miles	Travers Stakes	Saratoga	1-20	5	1	2:05 3/5	5 1/2 lengths	(Dictar)	
Aug 22, 1953	1 1/8 miles	American Derby	Washington Park	1-10	8	1	1:48 2/5	2 lengths	(Landlocked)	
1954 (4-year-old season)
May 7, 1954	6 furlongs	Allowance	Belmont Park	3-20	7	1	1:11 4/5	1 1/4 lengths	(Laffango)	
May 15, 1954	1 mile	Metropolitan Handicap	Belmont Park	1-4	9	1	1:35 1/5	neck	(Straight Face)	
Aug 1, 1954	7 furlongs	Oneonta Handicap	Saratoga	n/a (Note: wagering was not allowed)	3	1	1:24 1/5	9 lengths	(First Glance)	

== Stud record ==
At stud, Native Dancer sired 43 stakes winners (or 44 according to one source) from 306 foals. His male-line descendants, particularly through his grandson Mr. Prospector, have dominated the US Triple Crown races. He is also the damsire of Northern Dancer, arguably the most influential stallion of the 20th century.

Although Native Dancer never led the American sire list, he did finish second in 1966 and sixth in 1965. He was also second in the English sire list of 1963, and seventh in the French sire list of 1963.

Among Native Dancer's notable offspring are:

- Atan - sire of major sire Sharpen Up
- Dan Cupid – won Prix du Bois and other stakes races in France; sire of Sea-Bird (won Epsom Derby and Prix de l'Arc de Triomphe)
- Dancer's Image - won 1968 Kentucky Derby (disqualified)
- Dancing Cap - Sired JRA Hall of Fame inductee Oguri Cap
- Exclusive Dancer - stakes winner and dam of General Assembly
- Gala Performance - won Jim Dandy Stakes: sire of steeplechasers, including West Tip, the winner of the 1986 Aintree Grand National and Monksfield.
- Good Move - won Selima Stakes etc.
- Hula Dancer - raced in France and England where her wins included the 1,000 Guineas
- Kauai King - won the 1966 Kentucky Derby, Preakness Stakes
- Natalma - dam of Northern Dancer
- Native Charger - won the 1965 Flamingo Stakes, Florida Derby
- Native Prince – won Great American Stakes etc.
- Native Street - multiple stakes wins including the 1966 Kentucky Oaks
- Protanto - multiple stakes wins including the 1971 Whitney Stakes
- Raise a Native - co-champion two-year-old colt of 1963. important sire of Majestic Prince, Alydar and leading sire Mr. Prospector, as well as Exclusive Native, who sired Affirmed (the triple crown winner) and Genuine Risk
- Secret Step – won King George Stakes and July Cup etc. in England
- Shenanigans - 1975 Kentucky Broodmare of the Year. Dam of the champion filly Ruffian and influential sire Icecapade
- Street Dancer won Santa Ana Handicap etc.

Native Dancer's bloodline is credited with creating "precocious, speedy Thoroughbreds that dominate the Derby and other Triple Crown events." By 2008, every entrant in the Kentucky Derby was a descendant. However, he is also faulted for passing on his massive build and hard-pounding stride action, rendering many of his descendants vulnerable to injury. In the mid-2000s, there had been a troubling number of high-profile breakdowns, including that of Barbaro (who was distantly related to Native Dancer through his dam.) As the grandsire of Mr. Prospector, and the damsire of Northern Dancer, the two most important sires of the late twentieth century, a certain degree of inbreeding to Native Dancer became inevitable, potentially exacerbating the issue. "There's a lack of durability right now," said Ric Waldman, the former head of operations for Windfields Farm. "We're dealing with the law of diminishing returns." Vanderbilt's son Alfred G. Vanderbilt defended the stallion's legacy. "All these great horses are not descended from him because he's fragile," he said. "They're descended because he was a champion and he was durable."

Native Dancer died on November 16, 1967, following the surgical removal of a tumor on the wall of the small intestine. He was buried at Sagamore Farm.

== Honors ==
Native Dancer was inducted into the National Museum of Racing and Hall of Fame in 1963. He was inducted into the Maryland State Athletic Hall of Fame in 2014.

In the Blood-Horse magazine ranking of the top 100 U.S. thoroughbred champions of the 20th century, Native Dancer was ranked #7. In the Associated Press rankings of the greatest racehorses of the 20th century, he was ranked #3, tied with Citation, behind only Man o' War and Secretariat.

In August 2015, a statue of Native Dancer by Gwen Reardon was unveiled at Congress Park in Saratoga Springs. The statue was donated to the city by Marylou Whitney and John Hendrickson. Native Dancer was undefeated in his six starts at nearby Saratoga Race Course.

== Pedigree ==
Pedigree of Native Dancer (USA), grey stallion, 1950
Sire Polynesian Br.,1942	Unbreakable; Blk.,1935	Sickle (GB)	Phalaris (GB)
Sire Polynesian Br.,1942	Unbreakable; Blk.,1935	Sickle (GB)	Selene (GB)
Sire Polynesian Br.,1942	Unbreakable; Blk.,1935	Blue Grass (FR)	Prince Palatine (GB)
Sire Polynesian Br.,1942	Unbreakable; Blk.,1935	Blue Grass (FR)	Hour Glass
Sire Polynesian Br.,1942	Black Polly; B.,1936	Polymelian (GB)	Polymelus (GB)
Sire Polynesian Br.,1942	Black Polly; B.,1936	Polymelian (GB)	Pasquita (GB)
Sire Polynesian Br.,1942	Black Polly; B.,1936	Black Queen	Pompey
Sire Polynesian Br.,1942	Black Polly; B.,1936	Black Queen	Black Maria
Dam Geisha (USA) Gr.,1943	Discovery; Ch.,1931	Display	Fair Play
Dam Geisha (USA) Gr.,1943	Discovery; Ch.,1931	Display	Cicuta (GB)
Dam Geisha (USA) Gr.,1943	Discovery; Ch.,1931	Ariadne	Light Brigade (GB)
Dam Geisha (USA) Gr.,1943	Discovery; Ch.,1931	Ariadne	Adrienne
Dam Geisha (USA) Gr.,1943	Miyako; Gr.,1935	John P. Grier	Whisk Broom II
Dam Geisha (USA) Gr.,1943	Miyako; Gr.,1935	John P. Grier	Wonder
Dam Geisha (USA) Gr.,1943	Miyako; Gr.,1935	La Chica; Gr.,1930	Sweep
Dam Geisha (USA) Gr.,1943	Miyako; Gr.,1935	La Chica; Gr.,1930	La Grisette (IRE)

Native Dancer is shown as descending from (family 5-f), which traces back to the Bazajet Mare. However, the female descendants of his third-dam La Chica have a type of mitochondrial DNA that is inconsistent with other descendants of this family. As mitochondrial DNA is passed exclusively in the female line, this indicates a pedigree error occurred at some point between the Bazajet Mare's foaling in 1754 and La Chica's in 1930.

== See also ==
- List of leading Thoroughbred racehorses
- List of racehorses
