= Cain Hoy Stable =

Thoroughbred racing and breeding operation

- Company type: Horse breeding/racing stable
- Industry: Thoroughbred horse racing
- Predecessor: Falaise Stable
- Founded: 1929
- Defunct: 1970
- Headquarters: Jobstown, New Jersey; United States
- Key people: Owner: Harry Guggenheim Trainers: Frank A. Bonsal, Moody Jolley, Eddie Hayward, Loyd Gentry Jr., William W. Stephens, Angel Penna Sr., Woody Stephens Jockeys: Henry Moreno, Manuel Ycaza, Braulio Baeza

Cain Hoy Stable was a Thoroughbred racing stable and horse breeding operation with training facilities in Columbia, South Carolina, and Kissimmee, Florida. It was owned by Harry Guggenheim, who also raced horses in Europe. A founding member of the New York Racing Association, Guggenheim began racing in 1929 and originally raced as the Falaise Stable, the name of his Long Island, New York estate. In 1943, he renamed it the Cain Hoy Stable for his Cain Hoy Plantation, a 15,000-acre (61 km^{2}) timber and cattle plantation near Wando, South Carolina.

The stable's racing colors were blue and white blocks with white sleeves and cap. In 1959, Cain Hoy Stable led all American owners in earnings.

Among the jockeys who rode for Cain Hoy Stable were Henry Moreno, Manuel Ycaza, and Braulio Baeza. Trainers who worked for the stable included Frank A. Bonsal, Moody Jolley, Loyd Gentry Jr., Eddie Hayward, William W. Stephens, and U.S. Racing Hall of Fame inductees Angel Penna Sr. and Woody Stephens.

Cain Hoy Stable owned the mare Anchors Aweigh, the dam of Never Bow, Make Sail, Sheet Anchor, and Siama, who was the Kentucky Broodmare of the Year in 1960 and dam of Bald Eagle, One-Eyed King, and Dead Ahead. Cain Hoy was part of a 1959 breeding syndicate that purchased Belmont Stakes winner Cavan. The stable won numerous important graded stakes races including the Kentucky Oaks, Alabama Stakes, and Champagne Stakes on three occasions, and the then-prestigious Belmont Futurity and Withers Stakes twice. Cain Hoy had six horses won ran in the Kentucky Derby. They won the 1953 edition with Dark Star, handing the future Hall of Famer Native Dancer the only defeat of his career. Their next-best Derby finish came in 1963 when Never Bend finished second.

Cain Hoy bred and raced Ack Ack, the 1971 Horse of the Year and a U.S. Racing Hall of Fame inductee. The stable also bred American multiple stakes winner Bold Reason as well as the filly San San, who was sold to Countess Margit Batthyany in France and won the 1972 Prix de l'Arc de Triomphe.

Other successful horses included:

- Bald Eagle – back-to-back winner of the Washington, D.C. International, 1960 Champion Handicap Male
- Lalun - won Kentucky Oaks, Beldame Stakes, dam of Bold Reason and Never Bend
- Never Bend – 1962 Champion 2-year-old Male, sire of the 1971 Epsom Derby winner and European Horse of the Year Mill Reef
- One-Eyed King - multiple stakes winner including back-to-back wins in the Donn Handicap
- Turn-To - purchased in Ireland, multiple U.S. stakes winner, Leading Juvenile Sire in the U.S. in 1958, sire of Hail to Reason

In failing health, in January 1970 the elderly Harry Guggenheim sold Cain Hoy's bloodstock at a dispersal sale. The records of Cain Hoy Stables are part of the Harry Guggenheim papers at the United States' Library of Congress.

The Cain Hoy Stable was honored by the Keeneland Association with its Mark of Distinction in 1980.
