= Greatwood Gold Cup =

Steeplechase horse race in Britain

Greatwood Gold Cup Handicap Chase
2026
Heltenham	Blow Your Wad	Teddy Blue

Previous years
2025
Booster Bob	Vincenzo	Saint Segal
2024
Heltenham	Kandoo Kid	Gustavian
2023
The Big Bite	Gemirande	Paint The Dream
2022
Paint The Dream	Tamaroc Du Mathan	Senior Citizen
2021
Umbrigado	Killer Clown	The Big Bite

2020-2011
2019
San Benedeto	Gala Ball	Valdez
2017
Thomas Crapper	Vic De Touzaine	Hollywoodien
2016
Sametegal	Bennys Mist	Aerlite Supreme
2015
Sound Investment	Bennys Mist	Simply Wings
2014
Shangani	Rebel Rebellion	Elenika
2013
Pacha Du Polder	Big Fella Thanks	Tony Star
2012
Aerial	Dan Breen	Rileyev
2011
Fine Parchment	Tail of the Bank	Swing Bill

2010-2004
2010
Big Fella Thanks	Pasco	Au Courant
2009
New Little Bric	The Package	Mister Quasimodo
2008
Natal	Nacarat	Oneway
2007
Madison Du Berlais	Nozic	No Full
2006
Horus	Cornish Sett	Windsor Boy
2005
Supreme Prince	Horus	Chauvinist
2004
Isio	Turgeonev	Seebald

The Greatwood Gold Cup is a Premier Handicap National Hunt steeplechase in Great Britain which is open to horses aged five years or older. It is run at Newbury over a distance of about 2 miles and 4 furlongs (2 miles 3 furlongs and 187 yards, or 3,993 metres), and during its running there are sixteen fences to be jumped. It is a handicap race, and it is scheduled to take place each year in late February or early March.

The event was introduced in 2004, and for its first three runnings it was sponsored by Vodafone. Since then it has had several different sponsors, and for each of these its title changed accordingly. The race was promoted to Grade 3 level in 2007, and it was given its present name in 2010. It is now sponsored by BetVictor on behalf of Greatwood, a charity for the welfare of retired racehorses. The race was reclassified as a Premier Handicap from the 2023 running when Grade 3 handicap status was renamed by the British Horseracing Authority.

== Records ==
Leading jockey (3 wins):

- Nick Scholfield – Natal (2008), New Little Bric (2009), San Benedeto (2019)

Leading trainer (9 wins):

- Paul Nicholls – Cornish Sett (2006), Natal (2008), New Little Bric (2009), Big Fella Thanks (2010), Aerial (2012), Pacha Du Polder (2013), Sound Investment (2015), Sametegal (2016), San Benedeto (2019)

== Winners ==
- Weights given in stones and pounds

Year	Winner	Age	Weight	Jockey	Trainer
2004	Isio	8	11-04	Barry Geraghty	Nicky Henderson
2005	Supreme Prince	8	10–12	Paul Flynn	Philip Hobbs
2006	Cornish Sett (dead heat)	7	11-04	Ruby Walsh	Paul Nicholls
2006	Horus (dead heat)	11	10-09	Jamie Moore	Martin Pipe
2007	Madison du Berlais	6	11-05	Tom Scudamore	David Pipe
2008	Natal	7	10-01	Nick Scholfield (Note: amateur jockey)	Paul Nicholls
2009	New Little Bric	8	10-02	Nick Scholfield	Paul Nicholls
2010	Big Fella Thanks	8	11-01	Barry Geraghty	Paul Nicholls
2011	Fine Parchment	8	10-04	Peter Toole	Charlie Mann
2012	Aerial	6	11-03	Ruby Walsh	Paul Nicholls
2013	Pacha Du Polder	6	11-00	Ryan Mahon	Paul Nicholls
2014	Shangani	8	10–12	Tom Scudamore	Venetia Williams
2015	Sound Investment	7	11–12	Sam Twiston-Davies	Paul Nicholls
2016	Sametegal	7	11-03	Sam Twiston-Davies	Paul Nicholls
2017	Thomas Crapper	10	10-02	Charlie Poste	Robin Dickin
2018	Abandoned due to snow
2019	San Benedeto	8	11-05	Nick Scholfield	Paul Nicholls
2020	No race (Note: The 2020 race was abandoned due to waterlogging)
2021	Umbrigado	7	11-03	David Noonan	David Pipe
2022	Paint The Dream	8	11-11	Conor Brace	Fergal O'Brien
2023	The Big Bite	10	10-05	Jonathan Burke	Henry Oliver
2024	Heltenham	7	10-09	Ciaran Gethings	Dan Skelton
2025	Booster Bob	7	10-02	Sean Bowen	Olly Murphy
2026	Heltenham	9	11-00	Charlie Todd	Dan Skelton

== See also ==
- Horse racing in Great Britain
- List of British National Hunt races
