= Secrettame =

American-bred Thoroughbred racehorse

- Sire: Secretariat
- Grandsire: Bold Ruler
- Dam: Tamerett
- Damsire: Tim Tam
- Sex: Mare
- Foaled: 1978
- Country: United States
- Color: Chestnut
- Breeder: William O. Reed
- Owner: Audrey Reed
- Trainer: Bruce Johnstone
- Record: 10: 6–1–0
- Earnings: $101,985

Major wins
- Shirley Jones Handicap
- Last updated on September 16, 2006

Secrettame (March 15, 1978 – March 17, 2006) was a Thoroughbred racehorse and broodmare.

She was originally purchased as a one year old at the Keeneland Yearling Sales by Venezuelan owner Jose "Pepe" Sahagun and his Villa Blanca Farms. It was Sahagun's vision, even as a one year old, that she would one day be bred to Mr. Prospector. It was that vision that produced the stallion Gone West.

Secrettame was a daughter of the great Triple Crown winner Secretariat. Her dam, Tamerett, was sired by Hall of Famer Tim Tam who won the 1958 Kentucky Derby and the Preakness Stakes but whose strong bid for the Triple Crown and his racing career both ended when he fractured a sesamoid bone in his right foreleg a quarter of a mile from the finish and struggled the last yards in second place.

She was the dam of racehorse and sire Gone West, whose son, Elusive Quality, sired 2004 American Champion Three-Year-Old Colt Smarty Jones. Smarty Jones was the first undefeated horse to win the Kentucky Derby since Seattle Slew in 1977, but lost the final leg of the Triple Crown, the Belmont Stakes, to Birdstone. She was also the dam of Lion Cavern, who went on to sire 8 time Grade One winner Apache Cat.

In March 2006, at age 28 Secrettame died of a severe bout of colic.

== Pedigree ==
Pedigree of Secrettame, chestnut mare, 1978
Sire Secretariat	Bold Ruler	Nasrullah	Nearco
Sire Secretariat	Bold Ruler	Nasrullah	Mumtaz Begum
Sire Secretariat	Bold Ruler	Miss Disco	Discovery
Sire Secretariat	Bold Ruler	Miss Disco	Outdone
Sire Secretariat	Somethingroyal	Princequillo	Prince Rose
Sire Secretariat	Somethingroyal	Princequillo	Cosquilla
Sire Secretariat	Somethingroyal	Imperatrice	Caruso
Sire Secretariat	Somethingroyal	Imperatrice	Cinquepace
Dam Tamerett	Tim Tam	Tom Fool	Menow
Dam Tamerett	Tim Tam	Tom Fool	Gaga
Dam Tamerett	Tim Tam	Two Lea	Bull Lea
Dam Tamerett	Tim Tam	Two Lea	Two Bob
Dam Tamerett	Mixed Marriage	Tudor Minstrel	Owen Tudor
Dam Tamerett	Mixed Marriage	Tudor Minstrel	Sansonnet
Dam Tamerett	Mixed Marriage	Persian Maid	Tehran
Dam Tamerett	Mixed Marriage	Persian Maid	Aroma (family: 2-f)
