= Classic Fame =

American-bred Thoroughbred racehorse

- Sire: Nijinsky
- Grandsire: Northern Dancer
- Dam: Family Fame
- Damsire: Droll Role
- Sex: Stallion
- Foaled: 29 March 1986
- Country: United States
- Colour: Bay
- Breeder: Kinderhill-Aron Associates
- Owner: Classic Thoroughbreds
- Trainer: Vincent O'Brien; Gary F. Jones
- Record: 19: 8-3-3
- Earnings: $913,853

Major wins
- National Stakes (1988); Beresford Stakes (1988); American Handicap (1990); San Gabriel Handicap (1992); San Marcos Handicap (1992)

Classic Fame (29 March 1986 – after 2002) was an American-bred Thoroughbred racehorse and sire. In a track career interrupted by illness and injury he won eight of his nineteen starts over five seasons. He began in Ireland as a two-year-old in 1988 when he was unbeaten in three races including the National Stakes and the Beresford Stakes. After being well beaten in two starts as a three-year-old he developed Horse colic and missed the rest of the year before being transferred to the United States. Racing mainly in California he won the American Handicap in 1990 and then returned from injury to take the San Gabriel Handicap and San Marcos Handicap as a six-year-old in 1992.

== Background ==
Classic Fame was a bay horse with no white markings bred in Kentucky by Kinderhill-Aron Associates. As a yearling in July 1987 the colt was consigned to the Keeneland Sale and was bought for $750,000 by the trainer Vincent O'Brien. He was acting on behalf of Classic Thoroughbreds, a public company founded by O'Brien, Robert Sangster and John Magnier. The colt was sent to Europe and was taken into training by O'Brien at Ballydoyle.

He was sired by Nijinsky, the Canadian-bred winner of the English Triple Crown in 1970 who went on to become an important stallion, siring horses such as Ferdinand, Lammtarra, Caerleon, Sky Classic and Shahrastani. Classic Fame's dam Family Fame was an unraced, Illinois-bred daughter of the Washington DC International winner Droll Role. She was a third-generation descendant of Two Bob, who won the Kentucky Oaks in 1936 and was the female-line ancestor of numerous major winners including Tim Tam, On-and-On, Chief's Crown, Excellent Art, Deep Sky, Special Duty and Winning Colors.

== Racing career ==
=== 1988: two-year-old season ===
Classic Fame began his racing career in the Belleville Race over seven furlongs at Phoenix Park Racecourse on 3 September in which he started the 9/10 favourite and won by three lengths from Just A Millionaire. Seven days after his debut, the colt was stepped up to the highest level for the Group 1 National Stakes at the Curragh and was made the 9/4 favourite. The more fancied of his eleven opponents included Always Valiant (winner of the July Stakes), Corwyn Bay (Anglesey Stakes), Stone Flake (third in the Vintage Stakes) and the highly regarded maiden race winner Guaranteed Bonus. Ridden by John Reid he came home two lengths clear of Always Valliant, with Stone Flake a length away in third. In October Classic Fame was moved up to one mile for the Group 2 Beresford Stakes at the same track and was clearly expected to win again despite a four-pound weight penalty, as he started at odds of 1/2 against five opponents. He maintained his unbeaten record but was not impressive as he was "all out" to prevail by a head from the British-trained Prince Ibrahim.

=== 1989: three-year-old season ===
Classic Fame began his second campaign in the Irish 2000 Guineas at the Curragh on 20 May. Starting at odds of 8/1 he proved to be the best of the Irish contingent but came home fifth behind the British challengers Shaadi, Great Commotion, Distant Relative and Danehill. On 7 June he was sent to England and started a 33/1 outsider in the 210th running of the Epsom Derby over one and a half miles at Epsom Racecourse and finished seventh of the twelve runners, more than seventeen lengths behind the winner Nashwan.

Classic Fame missed the rest of his three-year-old season after suffering a bout of colic.

=== 1990: four-year-old season ===
For the 1990 season, Classic Fame was transferred to the United States where he entered training with Gary F. Jones. He began his North American career by winning an allowance race at Santa Anita in April and was then stepped up in class for the Grade II John Henry Handicap at Hollywood Park Racetrack the following month in which he finished second to Golden Pheasant. After finishing third to Mohamed Abdu in the Inglewood Handicap at Hollywood Park in June he contested the Grade II American Handicap on 4 July at the same track. In the straight, he appeared to be boxed against the rail but was extricated by his jockey Eddie Delahoussaye to win by three quarters of a length from the 1989 Turf champion Steinlen. Jones, who was wearing a "lucky" green jacket in honour of his Irish import commented "There was not too much of a place to go, but he got through. For a while, there, I thought we had no shot and I was getting ready to cuss. But then he came through. That's the way it's supposed to go all the time".

On his next appearance Classic Fame finished second to Fly Till Dawn in the Eddie Read Handicap at Del Mar Racetrack on 8 August. Three weeks later he was sent to Chicago to contest the Arlington Million and came home fourth behind Golden Pheasant, With Approval and Steinlen. He sustained a cannon bone fracture during the race and missed the rest of the season.

=== 1991: five-year-old season ===
After an absence of almost a year, Classic Fame returned at Del Mar in August and finished sixth in the ungraded Tsunami Slew Stakes, sustaining a hoof injury in the process. His other two races that season came in November: he won an allowance at Santa Anita and then finished third to Notorious Pleasure in the Citation Handicap at Hollywood Park.

=== 1992: six-year-old season ===
On 1 January 1992, Classic Fame began his fifth campaign at Santa Anita in the San Gabriel Handicap in which he was ridden by Delahoussaye and started second favourite behind Fly Till Dawn. He took the lead in the straight and drew away in the closing stages to win by two and three quarter lengths from Super May. Later that month at the same track the horse started favourite for the one and quarter mile San Marcos Handicap in a six-runner field which also included Golden Pheasant, Fly Till Dawn and Super May. With Delahousaye again in the saddle he raced in fourth place before moving up to second on the home turn, overtaking Fly Till Dawn in the straight and winning by half a length. Delahoussaye commented "I loved the pace. I was just hoping he'd kick on. He dug in and caught that horse. I thought Fly Till Dawn would stop sooner... I don't know how far he'll go. They were concerned about a mile and a quarter, but he did it today".

At Santa Anita in March, Classic Fame started second favourite for the Arcadia Handicap but ran poorly and finished unplaced behind his old rival Fly Till Dawn. Despite his defeat the horse was made favourite when he stepped up to Grade I class for the Hollywood Turf Handicap in May, but finished second, beaten a length by the 1990 Epsom Derby winner Quest For Fame. On his final racecourse appearance at Hollywood Park in June Classic Fame came home third behind Notorious Pleasure and Marquetry in the John Henry Handicap.

== Stud record ==
At the end of his racing career Classic Fame was retired to become a breeding stallion in California before moving to New Zealand. His best offspring included Armstrong (New Zealand Stakes), Beaujolais (Manawatu Cup) and Gentle Call (Lowlands Stakes). His last recorded foal was born in 2003.

== Pedigree ==
Pedigree of Classic Fame (USA), bay stallion, 1986
Sire Nijinsky (CAN) 1967	Northern Dancer (CAN); 1961	Nearctic	Nearco
Sire Nijinsky (CAN) 1967	Northern Dancer (CAN); 1961	Nearctic	Lady Angela
Sire Nijinsky (CAN) 1967	Northern Dancer (CAN); 1961	Natalma	Native Dancer
Sire Nijinsky (CAN) 1967	Northern Dancer (CAN); 1961	Natalma	Almahmoud
Sire Nijinsky (CAN) 1967	Flaming Page (CAN); 1959	Bull Page	Bull Lea
Sire Nijinsky (CAN) 1967	Flaming Page (CAN); 1959	Bull Page	Our Page
Sire Nijinsky (CAN) 1967	Flaming Page (CAN); 1959	Flaring Top	Menow
Sire Nijinsky (CAN) 1967	Flaming Page (CAN); 1959	Flaring Top	Flaming Top
Dam Family Fame (USA) 1976	Droll Role (USA); 1968	Tom Rolfe	Ribot
Dam Family Fame (USA) 1976	Droll Role (USA); 1968	Tom Rolfe	Pocahontas
Dam Family Fame (USA) 1976	Droll Role (USA); 1968	Pradella	Preciptic
Dam Family Fame (USA) 1976	Droll Role (USA); 1968	Pradella	Nearly
Dam Family Fame (USA) 1976	Twice Over (USA); 1956	Ponder	Pensive
Dam Family Fame (USA) 1976	Twice Over (USA); 1956	Ponder	Miss Rushin
Dam Family Fame (USA) 1976	Twice Over (USA); 1956	Twosy	Bull Lea
Dam Family Fame (USA) 1976	Twice Over (USA); 1956	Twosy	Two Bob (Family:23-b)
