= 1966 in sports =

1966 in sports describes the year's events in world sport.

== Alpine skiing ==
- FIS Alpine World Ski Championships –
  - Men's combined champion: Jean-Claude Killy, France
  - Women's combined champion: Marielle Goitschel, France

== American football ==
- Orange Bowl (1965 season):
  - The Alabama Crimson Tide won 39–28 over the Nebraska Cornhuskers to win the AP Poll national championship after the previous #1 ranked Michigan State Spartans lost in the Rose Bowl and the #2 ranked Arkansas Razorbacks lost in the Cotton Bowl. This was the first time the AP conducted its final rankings at the conclusion of the postseason bowl games.
- June 8: The AFL and NFL reach an agreement to merge as equals into one league under the NFL name, to take effect with the 1970 season.
- AFL Championship – Kansas City Chiefs won 31–7 over the Buffalo Bills to advance to Super Bowl I in Jan. 1967
- NFL Championship – Green Bay Packers won 34–27 over the Dallas Cowboys to advance to Super Bowl I in Jan. 1967
- Each of the two existing top-level professional leagues added a new team for the 1966 season. The Atlanta Falcons joined the NFL, and the Miami Dolphins joined the AFL.
- 1966 NCAA University Division football season:
  - November 19 – The top-ranked Notre Dame Fighting Irish and the second-ranked Michigan State Spartans play to a 10–10 tie; Notre Dame retains its No. 1 ranking in the polls and are later named AP and UPI national champions.

== Artistic gymnastics ==
- World Artistic Gymnastics Championships
  - Men's all-around champion: Mikhail Voronin, USSR
  - Women's all-around champion: Věra Čáslavská, Czechoslovakia
  - Men's team competition champion: Japan
  - Women's team competition champion: Czechoslovakia

== Association football ==
=== England ===
- FA Cup final – Everton win 3–2 against Sheffield Wednesday

=== International ===
- World Cup – England defeats Germany to win the 1966 World Cup Final.
- FIFA decide to give the right to host the 1974 FIFA World Cup, 1978 FIFA World Cup and 1982 Football World Cup to West Germany, Argentina and Spain respectively

== Athletics ==
- July 17 – American runner Jim Ryun sets a new world record for the mile at 3:51.3
- August – 1966 Commonwealth Games held at Kingston, Jamaica
- September – 1966 European Championships in Athletics held at Budapest
- December – 1966 Asian Games held at Bangkok

== Australian rules football ==
- Victorian Football League
  - St Kilda wins the 70th VFL Premiership (St Kilda 10.14 (74) d Collingwood 10.13 (73))
  - Brownlow Medal awarded to Ian Stewart (St Kilda)

== Baseball ==
- Milwaukee Braves move to Atlanta, Georgia and become the Atlanta Braves.
- January 20 – The BBWAA elects Ted Williams to the Hall of Fame. Williams, the last batter to hit .400, receives 282 of a possible 302 votes.
- Roberto Clemente is the National League MVP.
- Frank Robinson is the American League MVP.
- Sandy Koufax of the Los Angeles Dodgers is the Major League Baseball Cy Young Award
- Tommie Agee of the Chicago White Sox is the American League MLB Rookie of the Year award
- Tommy Helms of the Cincinnati Red is the National League MLB Rookie of the Year award
- Ted Williams is inducted into Baseball Hall of Fame.
- World Series – Baltimore Orioles win 4 games to 0 over the Los Angeles Dodgers. Series MVP: Frank Robinson, Baltimore
- College World Series – Ohio State defeats Oklahoma State 8–2 at Johnny Rosenblatt Stadium. Ohio State pitcher Steve Arlin is named tournament Most Outstanding Player

== Basketball ==
- NCAA University Division Basketball Championship –
  - Texas Western wins 72–65 over Kentucky
- NBA Finals –
  - Boston Celtics won 4 games to 3 over the Los Angeles Lakers. This would be the last of the Celtics' record eight straight NBA titles.
- NBA MVP – Philadelphia 76ers center Wilt Chamberlain
- A first season of Basketball Bundesliga was held in Germany on October 1.
- A first Basketball Super League of Turkey games was held on December 13, replace from three regional (Istanbul, Ankara and İzmir) basketball league were merger.
- An NBA club, Chicago Bulls was founded in Illinois, United States on January 16.

== Boxing ==
- March 29, Muhammad Ali defeats George Chuvalo in a 15-round unanimous decision
- April 25 at New York City, World Welterweight Champion Emile Griffith won a 15-round unanimous decision over Dick Tiger to also become the World Middleweight Champion.
- May 21 Muhammad Ali defeats Henry Cooper with a 6th-round TKO
- August 6 Muhammad Ali defeats Brian London with a 3rd-round KO
- September 10 Muhammad Ali defeats Karl Mildenberger with a 12th-round TKO
- November 14, Muhammad Ali knocks out Cleveland Williams in three rounds to retain the WBC heavyweight title.

== Canadian football ==
- Grey Cup – Saskatchewan Roughriders win 29–14 over the Ottawa Rough Riders
- Vanier Cup – St. Francis Xavier X-Men win 40–14 over the Wilfrid Laurier Golden Hawks

== Cycling ==
- Giro d'Italia won by Gianni Motta of Italy
- Tour de France – Lucien Aimar of France
- Vuelta a España – Francisco Gabica of Spain
- UCI Road World Championships – Men's road race – Rudi Altig of Germany

== Figure skating ==
- World Figure Skating Championships –
  - Men's champion: Emmerich Dänzer, Austria
  - Ladies' champion: Peggy Fleming, United States
  - Pair skating champions: Ludmila Belousova & Oleg Protopopov, Soviet Union
  - Ice dancing champions: Diane Towler & Bernard Ford, Great Britain

== Golf ==
- July 24 – Tony Lema (32), American golf champion, died in an air crash at Munster, Indiana

Men's professional

- Masters Tournament – Jack Nicklaus
- U.S. Open – Billy Casper
- British Open – Jack Nicklaus becomes the fourth player to win all four major professional championships.
- PGA Championship – Al Geiberger
- PGA Tour money leader – Billy Casper – $121,945

Men's amateur

- British Amateur – Bobby Cole
- U.S. Amateur – Gary Cowan

Women's professional

- Women's Western Open – Mickey Wright
- LPGA Championship – Gloria Ehret
- U.S. Women's Open – Sandra Spuzich
- Titleholders Championship – Kathy Whitworth
- LPGA Tour money leader – Kathy Whitworth – $33,517

== Harness racing ==
- Romeo Hanover wins the United States Pacing Triple Crown races –
  1. Cane Pace – Romeo Hanover
  2. Little Brown Jug – Romeo Hanover
  3. Messenger Stakes – Romeo Hanover
- United States Trotting Triple Crown races –
  1. Hambletonian – Kerry Way
  2. Yonkers Trot – Polaris
  3. Kentucky Futurity – Governor Armbro
- Australian Inter Dominion Harness Racing Championship –
  - Pacers: Chamfer Star
  - Trotters: Yamamoto

== Horse racing ==
Steeplechases

- Cheltenham Gold Cup – Arkle
- Grand National – Anglo

Flat races

- Australia – Melbourne Cup won by Galilee
- Canada – Queen's Plate won by Titled Hero
- France – Prix de l'Arc de Triomphe won by Bon Mot
- Ireland – Irish Derby Stakes won by Sodium
- English Triple Crown Races:
  1. 2,000 Guineas Stakes – Kashmir
  2. The Derby – Charlottown
  3. St. Leger Stakes – Sodium
- United States Triple Crown Races:
  1. Kentucky Derby – Kauai King
  2. Preakness Stakes – Kauai King
  3. Belmont Stakes – Amberoid

== Ice hockey ==
- Art Ross Trophy as the NHL's leading scorer during the regular season: Bobby Hull, Chicago Black Hawks
- Hart Memorial Trophy – for the NHL's Most Valuable Player: Bobby Hull, Chicago Black Hawks
- Stanley Cup – Montreal Canadiens won 4–2 over the Detroit Red Wings
- World Hockey Championship
  - Men's champion: Soviet Union defeated Czechoslovakia
- NCAA Men's Ice Hockey Championship – Michigan State University Spartans defeat Clarkson University Golden Knights 6–1 in Minneapolis

== Orienteering ==
- First Orienteering World Championships held 1–2 October in Fiskars, Finland.

== Rugby league ==
- 1966 Great Britain Lions tour
- 1966 New Zealand rugby league season
- 1966 NSWRFL season
- 1965–66 Northern Rugby Football League season / 1966–67 Northern Rugby Football League season

== Rugby union ==
- 72nd Five Nations Championship series is won by Wales

== Snooker ==
- World Snooker Championship challenge match: John Pulman beats Fred Davis 5–2 in matches.

== Speed skating ==
- January 4 – death of Inga Artamonova (29), Russian world speed-skating champion, who was murdered by her husband

== Tennis ==
Australia

- Australian Men's Singles Championship – Roy Emerson (Australia) defeats Arthur Ashe (USA) 6–4, 6–8, 6–2, 6–3
- Australian Women's Singles Championship – Margaret Smith Court (Australia) defeats Nancy Richey (USA) walkover

England

- Wimbledon Men's Singles Championship – Manuel Santana (Spain) defeats Dennis Ralston (USA) 6–4, 11–9, 6–4
- Wimbledon Women's Singles Championship – Billie Jean King (USA) defeats Maria Bueno (Brazil) 6–3, 3–6, 6–1

France

- French Men's Singles Championship – Tony Roche (Australia) defeats István Gulyás (Hungary) 6–1, 6–4, 7–5
- French Women's Singles Championship – Ann Haydon Jones (Great Britain) defeats Nancy Richey (USA) 6–3, 6–1

USA

- American Men's Singles Championship – Tournament did not start until 1968
- American Women's Singles Championship – Tournament did not start until 1968

Davis Cup

- 1966 Davis Cup – Australia 4–1 India at Kooyong Stadium (grass) Melbourne, Australia

== Volleyball ==
- 1966 FIVB Men's World Championship in Prague won by Czechoslovakia

== Multi-sport events ==
- Asian Games held in Bangkok, Thailand
- 1966 British Empire and Commonwealth Games held in Kingston, Jamaica
- Central American and Caribbean Games held in San Juan, Puerto Rico
- Fourth Winter Universiade held in Sestriere, Italy

== Awards ==
- Associated Press Male Athlete of the Year – Frank Robinson, Major League Baseball
- Associated Press Female Athlete of the Year – Kathy Whitworth, LPGA golf
- Sports Illustrated Sportsman of the Year - Jim Ryun, running
