= 1968 Preakness Stakes =

93rd running of the Preakness Stakes

93rd Preakness Stakes
- The Preakness Stakes
- Location: Pimlico Race Course, Baltimore, Maryland, United States
- Date: May 18, 1968
- Winning horse: Forward Pass
- Jockey: Ismael Valenzuela
- Conditions: Fast
- Surface: Dirt

The 1968 Preakness Stakes was the 93rd running of the $200,000 Preakness Stakes thoroughbred horse race. The race took place on May 18, 1968, and was televised in the United States on the CBS television network. Forward Pass, who was jockeyed by Ismael Valenzuela, won the race by six lengths over runner-up Out Of The Way. Approximate post time was 5:31 p.m. Eastern Time. The race was run on a fast track in a final time of 1:56-4/5. The Maryland Jockey Club reported total attendance of 40,247, this is recorded as second highest on the list of American thoroughbred racing top attended events for North America in 1968.

== Payout ==
The 93rd Preakness Stakes Payout Schedule

Program Number	Horse Name	Win	Place	Show
2	Forward Pass	$4.20	$2.60	$2.60
7	Out of the Way	-	$6.40	$3.80
1	Nodouble	-	-	$4.20

== The full chart ==
Finish Position	Margin (lengths)	Post Position	Horse name	Jockey	Trainer	Owner	Post Time Odds	Purse Earnings
1st	0	2	Forward Pass	Ismael Valenzuela	Henry Forrest	Calumet Farm	1.10-1 favorite	$142,700
2nd	6	7	Out of the Way	John L. Rotz	Max Hirsch	King Ranch	14.80-1	$30,000
3rd	61/4	3	Dancer's Image *D	Robert Ussery	Lou Cavalaris, Jr.	Peter D. Fuller	1.20-1	*
4th	81/4	1	Nodouble	Willie McKeever	J. Bert Sonnier	Verna Lea Farms	16.80-1	$15,000
5th	81/2	10	Yankee Lad	Eldon Nelson	James L. Skinner	James L. Skinner	153.10-1	$7,500
6th	83/4	6	Jig Time	Ray Broussard	MacKenzie Miller	Cragwood Stables	31.00-1	
7th	103/4	5	Sir Beau	Chris Rogers	Judy Johnson	Tri Colour Stable	28.70-1	
8th	141/4	8	Martins Jig	Joe Culmone	Robert L. Beall	Mildred L. Beall	87.60-1	
9th	151/4	9	Ringmaster	Phil I. Grimm	Charles Wahler	Hubert B. Phipps	30.50-1	
10th	231/4	4	Wood-Pro	Karl Korte	Joseph Hackman	John Nero	173.40-1	

- A *D signifies that Dancer's Image ran third but was Disqualified and placed eighth.
- Winning Breeder: Calumet Farm; (KY)
- Winning Time: 1:56 4/5
- Track Condition: Fast
- Total Attendance: 40,247
