= 1968 Kentucky Derby =

Horse race

94th Kentucky Derby
- Kentucky Derby
- Grade I stakes race
- Location: Churchill Downs
- Date: May 4, 1968
- Winning horse: Forward Pass (Note: Dancer's Image was initially declared the winner of the race with Forward Pass coming in second but was later disqualified due to prohibited drugs being found in his system post-race making Forward Pass the winner.)
- Jockey: Ismael Valenzuela
- Trainer: Henry Forrest
- Owner: Calumet Farm
- Surface: Dirt

The 1968 Kentucky Derby was the 94th running of the Kentucky Derby. The race took place on May 4, 1968.

== Controversy over the disqualification of the winning horse ==
The race was the first Kentucky Derby in which the winning horse was subsequently disqualified. Dancer's Image won the race, but was disqualified to last after traces of phenylbutazone were discovered in the mandatory post-race urinalysis. Second-place finisher Forward Pass was declared the winner. The controversy filled the sporting news of media outlets in North America and was a cover story for Sports Illustrated, which referred to it as "the year's major sports story."

== Full results ==
Finished	Post	Horse	Jockey	Trainer	Owner	Time / behind
1st	10	Forward Pass	Ismael Valenzuela	Henry Forrest	Calumet Farm	2:02 1/5
2nd	7	Francie's Hat	Earlie Fires	James P. Conway	Saddle Rock Farm	
3rd	2	T V Commercial	Howard Grant	Anthony L. Basile	Bwamazon Farm	
4th	12	Kentucky Sherry	Jimmy Combest	Alcee J. Richard	Dorothy D. Brown	
5th	3	Jig Time	Ray Broussard	MacKenzie Miller	Cragwood Stables	
6th	4	Don B.	Donald Pierce	Lester Holt	Don B. Wood	
7th	13	Trouble Brewing	Buck Thornburg	William Sterling	Coventry Rock Farm	
8th	8	Proper Proof	Johnny Sellers	J. Lee Mosbacher	Mrs. Montgomery R. Fisher	
9th	14	Te Vega	Mike Manganello	George C. Berthold	Brunswick Farm (Frank C. Sullivan)	
10th	6	Captain's Gig	Manuel Ycaza	William Ward Stephens	Cain Hoy Stable	
11th	1	Iron Ruler	Braulio Baeza	Edward J. Yowell	October House Farm	
12th	5	Verbatim	Angel Cordero Jr.	Jerry C. Meyer	Elmendorf Farm	
13th	11	Gleaming Sword	Eddie Belmonte	Robert L. Wheeler	Cornelius Vanderbilt Whitney	
14th	9	Dancer's Image	Bobby Ussery	Lou Cavalaris Jr.	Peter D. Fuller	

- Winning Breeder: Calumet Farm; (KY)

== Race Description ==
Starting off out of the gates Dancers Image had a bad break out of the gate, leading the horse to fall behind very quickly being in last. Then Dancers Image started to make a comeback and getting all the way back to the front and by the 8th pole passed the favorite, Forward Pass, Leading Dancers image to victory. This was the 5th time a Horse had gone from last to first. This was short-lived as Dancers Image failed its urinalysis, this put Dancers Image back into last place. Runner-up Forward Pass was deemed the winner.
