= True North III =

American-bred Thoroughbred racehorse

True North
- Sire: Northern Dancer
- Grandsire: Nearctic
- Dam: Hill Rose
- Damsire: Rosemont
- Sex: Gelding
- Foaled: 1966
- Country: United States
- Colour: Chestnut
- Breeder: Newstead Farm
- Owner: C. V. Whitney
- Trainer: George T. Poole
- Record: 56: 10-15-11
- Earnings: US$308,073

Major wins
- Churchill Downs Handicap (1970); Seminole Handicap (1971); Widener Handicap (1971)

True North (foaled March 30, 1966 in Virginia) was an American Thoroughbred racehorse owned by Sonny Whitney and trained by George Poole.

== Background ==
True North was bred by Taylor Hardin's Newstead Farm in Upperville, Virginia. He was the son of the 20th century's greatest sire, Northern Dancer, and out of the mare Hill Rose, a daughter of Rosemont and Miss Disco who was also the dam of the very influential National Champion and Hall of Fame sire Bold Ruler.

== Racing career ==
True North was best known for winning the then richest race in Florida, the 1971 Widener Handicap at Hialeah Park Race Track.

== Pedigree ==
Pedigree of True North
Sire Northern Dancer	Nearctic	Nearco	Pharos
Sire Northern Dancer	Nearctic	Nearco	Nogara
Sire Northern Dancer	Nearctic	Lady Angela	Hyperion
Sire Northern Dancer	Nearctic	Lady Angela	Sister Sarah
Sire Northern Dancer	Natalma	Native Dancer	Polynesian
Sire Northern Dancer	Natalma	Native Dancer	Geisha
Sire Northern Dancer	Natalma	Almahmoud	Mahmoud
Sire Northern Dancer	Natalma	Almahmoud	Arbitrator
Dam Hill Rose	Rosemont	The Porter	Sweep
Dam Hill Rose	Rosemont	The Porter	Ballet Girl
Dam Hill Rose	Rosemont	Garden Rose	Colin
Dam Hill Rose	Rosemont	Garden Rose	Garden of Allah
Dam Hill Rose	Miss Disco	Discovery	Display
Dam Hill Rose	Miss Disco	Discovery	Ariadne
Dam Hill Rose	Miss Disco	Outdone	Pompey
Dam Hill Rose	Miss Disco	Outdone	Sweep Out
