= Bardstown (horse) =

American-bred Thoroughbred racehorse

- Sire: Alibhai
- Grandsire: Hyperion
- Dam: Twilight Tear
- Damsire: Bull Lea
- Sex: Gelding
- Foaled: 1952
- Country: United States
- Colour: Bay
- Breeder: Calumet Farm
- Owner: Calumet Farm
- Trainer: Horace A. Jones
- Record: 31: 18-7-1
- Earnings: US$628,752

Major wins
- Buckeye Handicap (1956); Equipoise Mile Handicap (1956); Longport Handicap (1956); Quaker City Handicap (1956,1958); Trenton Handicap (1956); Appleton Handicap (1957); Gulfstream Park Handicap (1957); Tropical Handicap (1957, 1959); Widener Handicap (1957, 1959); Orange Bowl Handicap (1959)

Bardstown (1952–1972) was an American Thoroughbred racehorse.

== Background ==
He was bred and raced by Calumet Farm of Lexington, Kentucky who named him for the city of Bardstown in Nelson County, Kentucky. Due to ankle and hip joint problems, Bardstown, a gelding, did not race until age four but then competed for four years and became one of the top older horses of his time.

== Racing career ==
Trained by "Jimmy" Jones, among his important wins Bardstown twice won Florida's Tropical Handicap at Tropical Park Race Track as well as the premier event on the winter racing calendar, the Widener Handicap at Hialeah Park Race Track in Hialeah, Florida. At age seven, Bardstown set a new Tropical Park track record of 1:40 2/5 for a mile and one sixteenth on dirt while winning the 1959 Orange Bowl Handicap.

== Retirement ==
Bardstown was retired to Calumet Farm in 1960 where he died in 1972.

== Pedigree ==
Pedigree of Bardstown
Sire Alibhai	Hyperion	Gainsborough	Bayardo
Sire Alibhai	Hyperion	Gainsborough	Rose Drop
Sire Alibhai	Hyperion	Selene	Chaucer
Sire Alibhai	Hyperion	Selene	Serenissima
Sire Alibhai	Teresina	Tracery	Rock Sand
Sire Alibhai	Teresina	Tracery	Topiary
Sire Alibhai	Teresina	Blue Tit	Wildflower
Sire Alibhai	Teresina	Blue Tit	Petit Bleu
Dam Twilight Tear	Bull Lea	Bull Dog	Teddy
Dam Twilight Tear	Bull Lea	Bull Dog	Plucky Liege
Dam Twilight Tear	Bull Lea	Rose Leaves	Ballot
Dam Twilight Tear	Bull Lea	Rose Leaves	Colonial
Dam Twilight Tear	Lady Lark	Blue Larkspur	Black Servant
Dam Twilight Tear	Lady Lark	Blue Larkspur	Blossom Time
Dam Twilight Tear	Lady Lark	Ladana	Lucullite
Dam Twilight Tear	Lady Lark	Ladana	Adana
