= Two Bob =

American-bred Thoroughbred racehorse

- Breed: Thoroughbred
- Sire: The Porter
- Grandsire: Sweep
- Dam: Blessings
- Damsire: Chicle
- Sex: Mare
- Foaled: 1933
- Died: 1953
- Country: United States
- Colour: Chestnut
- Breeder: Cornelius Vanderbilt Whitney
- Owner: Cornelius Vanderbilt Whitney (to 1939); Mrs. Emil Denemark (1939–1940); Calumet Farm (from 1940)
- Trainer: James W. Healy
- Record: 94: 12-14-16
- Earnings: $22,170

Major wins
- Kentucky Oaks (1936)
- Last updated on June 5, 2018

Two Bob (1933–1953) was an American Thoroughbred racehorse. Although she was successful on the racetrack, winning the Kentucky Oaks as a three-year-old and finishing second or third in several other stakes races, Two Bob's primary legacy was as a broodmare, producing three stakes winners and becoming an important foundation mare.

== Racing career ==
Two Bob began her racing career racing for owner Cornelius Vanderbilt Whitney and was trained by James W. Healy. She started 23 times at age two and raced predominantly in claiming races. At age three, she finished third in the Christmas Handicap at Tropical Park and won the Kentucky Oaks. In the Kentucky Oaks, she was sent off as the 2.20-1 favorite against 11 other rivals. Two Bob broke well at the start and stalked the pace set by Marica and Dora May, taking the lead in the stretch and drawing away to win the race by four lengths over Threadneedle in a final time of 1:52 3/5 over a fast track. Her connections earned $4,625 for the win.

Two Bob continued to race after her Oaks win, but did not win any more races for Whitney. She was claimed in 1939 for $4,500 and finished her racing career for Mrs. Emil Denemark, including a win in the 1939 Royal Palm Handicap. Following her racing career, she was sold to Warren Wright of Calumet Farm.

== Retirement ==
Two Bob produced seven foals as a broodmare, all of which were winners on the racetrack. Three of her foals, all fillies sired by Bull Lea, became stakes winners and later notable broodmares themselves.

Her first foal, Twosy, won three stakes races at ages two, four and five. Through Twosy, Two Bob is the direct female-line ancestor of champions Chris Evert, Chief's Crown, and Winning Colors.

Two Bob's 1946 foal, Two Lea, went on to become the co-champion three-year-old filly of 1949 (alongside Wistful) and the champion older female in 1950, and was inducted into the United States Racing Hall of Fame in 1981. She won 15 of her 26 races, including the Arcadia Handicap, Santa Margarita Handicap, and the Hollywood Gold Cup, which she won following a 22-month layoff due to leg problems. Two Lea later became the dam of 1958 Kentucky Derby and Preakness Stakes winner Tim Tam and multiple stakes winner and sire On-and-On.

The final of Two Bob's three stakes-winning daughters, Miz Clementine, won 11 stakes races during her racing career. In the 1955 Santa Anita Maturity, she defeated 1954 Kentucky Derby winner Determine but was disqualified. As a broodmare, she became the second dam of the sire Best Turn.

== Death ==
Two Bob died in 1953 after foaling a colt by Bull Lea, who was placed on a nurse mare. She was buried at Calumet Farm.

== Pedigree ==
Pedigree of Two Bob, chestnut mare, foaled 1933
Sire The Porter bay 1915	Sweep br. 1907	Ben Brush b. 1893	Bramble
Sire The Porter bay 1915	Sweep br. 1907	Ben Brush b. 1893	Roseville
Sire The Porter bay 1915	Sweep br. 1907	Pink Domino br. 1897	Domino
Sire The Porter bay 1915	Sweep br. 1907	Pink Domino br. 1897	Belle Rose
Sire The Porter bay 1915	Ballet Girl ch. 1906	St. Leonards b. 1890	St. Blaise
Sire The Porter bay 1915	Ballet Girl ch. 1906	St. Leonards b. 1890	Belladonna
Sire The Porter bay 1915	Ballet Girl ch. 1906	Cerito ch. 1888	Lowland Chief
Sire The Porter bay 1915	Ballet Girl ch. 1906	Cerito ch. 1888	Merry Dance
Dam Blessings bay 1925	Chicle b. 1913	Spearmint b. 1903	Carbine
Dam Blessings bay 1925	Chicle b. 1913	Spearmint b. 1903	Maid of the Mint
Dam Blessings bay 1925	Chicle b. 1913	Lady Hamburg II br. 1908	Hamburg
Dam Blessings bay 1925	Chicle b. 1913	Lady Hamburg II br. 1908	Lady Frivoles
Dam Blessings bay 1925	Mission Bells b. 1919	Friar Rock ch. 1913	Rock Sand
Dam Blessings bay 1925	Mission Bells b. 1919	Friar Rock ch. 1913	Fairy Gold
Dam Blessings bay 1925	Mission Bells b. 1919	Sanctuary b. 1911	Broomstick
Dam Blessings bay 1925	Mission Bells b. 1919	Sanctuary b. 1911	Vespers (Family 23-b)
