= On-and-On =

American-bred Thoroughbred racehorse

- Sire: Nasrullah
- Grandsire: Nearco
- Dam: Two Lea
- Damsire: Bull Lea
- Sex: Stallion
- Foaled: 1956
- Country: United States
- Color: Bay
- Breeder: Calumet Farm
- Owner: Calumet Farm
- Trainer: Horace A. Jones
- Record: 58: 12-11-10
- Earnings: US$390,718

Major wins
- Ohio Derby (1959); Sheridan Stakes (1959); Brooklyn Handicap (1960); Arch Ward Handicap (1960); Tropical Park Orange Bowl Handicap (1960); McLennan Handicap (1960); Tropical Park Handicap (1960)

On-and-On (April 24, 1956 – 1970) was an American Thoroughbred racehorse who was a top runner for owner/breeder Calumet Farm and the sire of their 1968 Kentucky Derby and Preakness Stakes winner, Forward Pass and the damsire of U.S. Racing Hall of Fame inductee Alydar.

Bred in Kentucky, On-and-On was trained by future U.S. Racing Hall of Fame inductee Jimmy Jones The colt did not develop enough to compete in any of the 1959 U.S. Triple Crown races but went on to win the Ohio Derby and at age four earned wins in important events such as the Brooklyn McLennan and Tropical Park Handicaps, setting a new track record for a mile and eighth on dirt in the latter that was only 1/5 of a second off the world record.

On-and-On died in 1970 and was buried in Calumet Farm's equine cemetery.

== Pedigree ==
Pedigree of On-and-On, bay stallion, 1956
| Sire Nasrullah 1940 | Nearco | Pharos | Phalaris |
| Sire Nasrullah 1940 | Nearco | Pharos | Scapa Flow |
| Sire Nasrullah 1940 | Nearco | Nogara | Havresac |
| Sire Nasrullah 1940 | Nearco | Nogara | Catnip |
| Sire Nasrullah 1940 | Mumtaz Begum | Blenheim | Blandford |
| Sire Nasrullah 1940 | Mumtaz Begum | Blenheim | Malva |
| Sire Nasrullah 1940 | Mumtaz Begum | Mumtaz Mahal | The Tetrarch |
| Sire Nasrullah 1940 | Mumtaz Begum | Mumtaz Mahal | Lady Josephine |
| Dam Two Lea 1946 | Bull Lea | Bull Dog | Teddy |
| Dam Two Lea 1946 | Bull Lea | Bull Dog | Plucky Liege |
| Dam Two Lea 1946 | Bull Lea | Rose Leaves | Ballot |
| Dam Two Lea 1946 | Bull Lea | Rose Leaves | Colonial |
| Dam Two Lea 1946 | Two Bob | The Porter | Sweep |
| Dam Two Lea 1946 | Two Bob | The Porter | Ballet Girl |
| Dam Two Lea 1946 | Two Bob | Blessings | Chicle |
| Dam Two Lea 1946 | Two Bob | Blessings | Mission Bells (family: 23-b) |
