= Alibhai (horse) =

British-bred Thoroughbred stallion

- Sire: Hyperion
- Grandsire: Gainsborough
- Dam: Teresina
- Damsire: Tracery
- Sex: Stallion
- Foaled: 1938
- Country: United States
- Colour: Chestnut
- Breeder: Aga Khan III
- Owner: Louis B. Mayer
- Record: unraced
- Earnings: US$

Honours
- California Thoroughbred Hall of Fame (1988)

Alibhai (1938–1960) was a British Thoroughbred racehorse who was purchased by Hollywood movie mogul Louis B. Mayer for 3,200 guineas and brought to the United States. He was sired by Epsom Derby winner Hyperion who was a six-time leading sire in Great Britain and Ireland. Grandsire Gainsborough was the 1918 English Triple Crown champion. Alibhai's dam Teresina was the daughter of Tracery whose major wins included the 1912 St. Leger Stakes and 1913 Champion Stakes.

== Stud record ==
Injured during training in California, Alibhai never raced but became a very important sire in the United States. He was sent to stand at stud in 1941 at Louis Mayer's California farm and was an immediate success, leading the California sires lists for five straight years. Syndicated for a then world record price of $500,000, in 1947 Alibhai was moved to stand at Spendthrift Farm in Lexington, Kentucky where he died in 1960 at the age of twenty-two.

In all, Alibhai sired 54 stakes winners of which his best were:

- Cover Up (1943) - wins include Hollywood Gold Cup, Sunset Handicap, Bing Crosby Handicap
- On Trust (1944) - multiple stakes winner including the Santa Anita Derby
- Your Host (1947) - wins included the 1949 Del Mar Futurity and 1950 Santa Anita Derby. Successful sire of five-time American Horse of the Year Kelso
- Solidarity (1945) - wins included the Hollywood Gold Cup, San Pasqual Handicap
- Determine (1951) - 1954 Kentucky Derby winner
- Bardstown (1952) - multiple winner of major stakes including twice in the Widener and Tropical Handicaps.
- Flower Bowl (1952) - won Delaware and Ladies Handicap. Dam of champion two- and three-year-old filly Bowl of Flowers and of Graustark and His Majesty.
- Honey's Alibi (1952) - won Malibu Sequet Stakes, Santa Catalina Handicap, San Diego Handicap. Damsire of Hall of Fame mare, Dahlia
- Traffic Judge (1952) - wins include the Woodward Stakes, Ohio Derby, Jerome Handicap, Metropolitan and Suburban Handicaps
- Bornastar (1953) - American Champion Older Female Horse (1958)
- Mr. Consistency (1958) - wins included Santa Anita Handicap, San Juan Capistrano Handicap, California Derby, Del Mar Handicap

== Sire line tree ==
- Alibhai
  - Cover Up
  - On Trust
    - Trackmaster
  - Solidarity
  - Your Host
    - Blen Host
    - Social Climber
    - Kelso
    - Windy Sands
      - Crystal Water
  - My Host
  - Chevation
  - Determine
    - Warfare
      - Assagai
        - Big Whippendeal
        - Almost Grown
    - Decidedly
      - Tinajero
      - Wardlaw
        - Florida Law
    - Donut King
  - Bardstown
  - Honeys Alibi
  - Traffic Judge
    - Green Ticket
    - Delta Judge
    - Traffic
      - Rheffic
        - Dom Pasquini
    - Traffic Bridge
      - Branch County
    - Court Recess
    - Traffic Mark
    - Judgeable
    - Rest Your Case
    - Traffic Cop
      - Deputed Testamony
        - Testafly
    - Court Ruling
  - Sharpsburg
  - Oligarchy
  - Mr Consistency

== Pedigree ==
Pedigree of Alibhai
Sire Hyperion	Gainsborough	Bayardo	Bay Ronald
Sire Hyperion	Gainsborough	Bayardo	Galicia
Sire Hyperion	Gainsborough	Rosedrop	St Frusquin*
Sire Hyperion	Gainsborough	Rosedrop	Rosaline
Sire Hyperion	Selene	Chaucer	St Simon*
Sire Hyperion	Selene	Chaucer	Canterbury Pilgrim
Sire Hyperion	Selene	Serenissima	Minoru
Sire Hyperion	Selene	Serenissima	Gondolette
Dam Teresina	Tracery	Rock Sand	Sainfoin
Dam Teresina	Tracery	Rock Sand	Roquebrune*
Dam Teresina	Tracery	Topiary	Orme
Dam Teresina	Tracery	Topiary	Plaisanterie
Dam Teresina	Blue Tit	Wildfowler	Gallinule
Dam Teresina	Blue Tit	Wildfowler	Tragedy
Dam Teresina	Blue Tit	Petit Bleu	Eager
Dam Teresina	Blue Tit	Petit Bleu	Letterewe

* Alibhai is inbred 5S x 4S x 5D to the stallion St Simon, meaning that he appears fifth generation (via St Frusquin) and fourth generation on the sire side of his pedigree, and fifth generation (via Roquebrune) on the dam side of his pedigree.
