= Kauai King =

American-bred Thoroughbred racehorse

- Sire: Native Dancer
- Grandsire: Polynesian
- Dam: Sweep In
- Damsire: Blenheim
- Sex: Stallion
- Foaled: 1963
- Country: United States
- Color: Dark Bay
- Breeder: Pine Brook Farm
- Owner: Ford Stable (Mike Ford). Silks: White, Blue Diamonds & Braces, Blue Sleeves, Blue & White Cap
- Trainer: Henry Forrest
- Record: 16: 9-2-1
- Earnings: $381,397

Major wins
- Prince George's Stakes (1966); Governor's Gold Cup (1966); Fountain of Youth Stakes (1966) American Triple Crown wins: Kentucky Derby (1966); Preakness Stakes (1966)

Honors
- Maryland-bred champion 3-year-old, 1966; Maryland-bred Horse of the Year, 1966; Inducted into the Maryland Thoroughbred Hall of Fame, April 27, 2016 (Fifty year anniversary of winning the Kentucky Derby and Preakness)
- Last updated on June 1, 2016

Kauai King (April 3, 1963 – January 24, 1989) was an American Thoroughbred racehorse was foaled on April 3, 1963, at Sagamore Farm in Glyndon, Maryland. His sire was Native Dancer and his dam was Sweep In. In 1966, Kauai King won the first two legs of the U.S. Triple Crown. To date, Kauai King is one of only two horses born in Maryland to have crossed the Kentucky Derby finish line first, but 1968 winner Dancer's Image was later stripped of his title, leaving Kauai King as the only official Maryland-bred winner of the Derby.

== Racing career ==
Ridden by jockey Don Brumfield, Kauai King won the 1966 Kentucky Derby and Preakness Stakes but finished fourth in the Belmont Stakes at Aqueduct Racetrack, two lengths behind the winner, Amberoid. With his sire (Native Dancer) and grandsire (Polynesian), three successive generations won the Preakness Stakes, a feat accomplished only one other time. On June 16, the colt was sold to a horse breeding syndicate for a then record price of $2,520,000.

Other top three-year-olds in 1966 included Graustark and 1965 Champion 2-Year-Old Colt Buckpasser. The undefeated Graustark's racing career ended with a broken coffin bone in the Blue Grass Stakes, and an injury kept Buckpasser out of the Triple Crown races. Even after Kauai King's wins in the Kentucky Derby and the Preakness Stakes, there was much speculation as to which was the better horse. On June 27, 1966, Kauai King (against the advice of his trainer, Henry Forrest) and Buckpasser met in the Arlington Classic. Kauai King's racing career came to an end when he pulled a ligament in his leg during the race. Following the announcement of his career-ending injury, he was retired to stand at stud at Alfred G. Vanderbilt II's Sagamore Farm in Glyndon, Maryland. Kauai King is still one of only two dual Classic winners ever bred in Maryland (the other was Cloverbrook, foaled in 1874) and one of only nine to win a Triple Crown race.

== Retirement ==
Kauai King proved less than successful as a sire. Near the end of 1971, he was shipped to stand at stud in England. He remained there until 1973. He then was sent to a breeding farm in Japan where he died on January 24, 1989, of old age.

== Breeding ==
Pedigree of Kauai King
Sire Native Dancer ch. 1950	Polynesian brown 1942	Unbreakable	Sickle
Sire Native Dancer ch. 1950	Polynesian brown 1942	Unbreakable	Blue Grass
Sire Native Dancer ch. 1950	Polynesian brown 1942	Black Polly	Polymelian
Sire Native Dancer ch. 1950	Polynesian brown 1942	Black Polly	Black Queen
Sire Native Dancer ch. 1950	Geisha gray 1943	Discovery	Display
Sire Native Dancer ch. 1950	Geisha gray 1943	Discovery	Ariadne
Sire Native Dancer ch. 1950	Geisha gray 1943	Miyako	John P Grier
Sire Native Dancer ch. 1950	Geisha gray 1943	Miyako	La Chica
Dam Sweep In bay 1942	Blenheim bay 1927	Blandford	Swynford
Dam Sweep In bay 1942	Blenheim bay 1927	Blandford	Blanche
Dam Sweep In bay 1942	Blenheim bay 1927	Malva	Charles O'Malley
Dam Sweep In bay 1942	Blenheim bay 1927	Malva	Wild Arum
Dam Sweep In bay 1942	Sweepesta bay 1925	Sweep	Ben Brush
Dam Sweep In bay 1942	Sweepesta bay 1925	Sweep	Pink Domino
Dam Sweep In bay 1942	Sweepesta bay 1925	Celesta	Sempronius
Dam Sweep In bay 1942	Sweepesta bay 1925	Celesta	Rezia
