= Forward Pass (horse) =

American-bred Thoroughbred racehorse

- Sire: On-and-On
- Grandsire: Nasrullah
- Dam: Princess Turia
- Damsire: Heliopolis
- Sex: Stallion
- Foaled: March 28, 1965
- Died: December 1, 1980 (aged 15)
- Country: United States
- Colour: Bay
- Breeder: Calumet Farm
- Owner: Calumet Farm
- Trainer: Henry Forrest
- Record: 23: 10-4-2
- Earnings: $678,231

Major wins
- Flash Stakes (1967); Hibiscus Stakes (1968); Everglades Stakes (1968); Florida Derby (1968); Blue Grass Stakes (1968); American Derby (1968) American Triple Crown wins: Kentucky Derby (1968); Preakness Stakes (1968)

Awards
- TSD U.S. Co-Champion 3-Yr-Old Colt (1968)

Honours
- Forward Pass Stakes at Arlington Park
- Last updated on October 31, 2006

Forward Pass (March 28, 1965 – December 1, 1980) was an American Thoroughbred Champion racehorse who was the first horse in the history of the Kentucky Derby to have been declared the winner as the result of a disqualification.

== Background ==
Forward Pass was sired by On-and-On, a half-brother to Kentucky Derby winner Tim Tam who is also known as the damsire of Alydar. His dam, Princess Turia, won the 1956 Kentucky Oaks, as well as the Black-Eyed Susan Stakes and Delaware Handicap during her racing career. Princess Turia's other progeny include graded stakes winner Turn to Turia and full brothers to Forward Pass Ever On, Dinamode, and Prince Turian.

Prince Turian stood stallion duties in Venezuela, Dinamode stood in the United States at Marablue Farm in Florida, and Ever On had a brief stallion career in the United States at Winston Farm, the farm of his owner Suzanne Perdue.

Owned and bred by Calumet Farm, the colt was trained by Henry Forrest.

== Racing career ==
Racing at age three, Forward Pass won several graded stakes races, including three important U.S. Triple Crown prep races: the Everglades Stakes, the Florida Derby and the Blue Grass Stakes.

=== 1968 Kentucky Derby ===
The betting favorite going into the 1968 Kentucky Derby, Forward Pass finished second, but winner Dancer's Image was disqualified to last place after traces of phenylbutazone were discovered in the mandatory post-race urinalysis. As a result, Forward Pass was declared the winner. The controversy filled the sporting news of media outlets in North America and was a cover story for Sports Illustrated, which referred to it as "the year's major sports story."

It was revealed that Dancer's Image had been plagued by sore ankles and on the Sunday prior to the Kentucky Derby, his handlers had a veterinarian give the horse a phenylbutazone tablet, a non-steroidal anti-inflammatory drug (nsaid) commonly used to relieve inflammation of the joints, which was legal at many race tracks in the United States but not at Churchill Downs. However, it was still a legitimate practice, as the medication would dissipate from the horse's system during the six days before the Derby. When the horse's post-Derby urinalysis revealed the phenylbutazone, his owner and handlers believed someone else may have been motivated to give the colt another dose of the drug, and they filed an appeal of the disqualification. The Kentucky State Racing Commission examined the matter and ordered distribution of the purse with first money to Forward Pass. This decision was upheld in April 1972 by Kentucky's highest court in Kentucky State Racing Commission v. Fuller, 481 S.W.2d 298 (Ky, 1972). In a subsequent decision, the Commission ordered that Forward Pass be considered the winner of the 1968 Kentucky Derby and that his owners were to receive the Derby's gold cup.

It was not until Country House in 2019 that another horse was declared winner of the Kentucky Derby as the result of a disqualification.

=== 1968 Preakness and Belmont ===
In a rematch with Dancer's Image in the Preakness Stakes, Forward Pass won by six lengths. As the third leg of the U.S. Triple Crown approached, the Derby controversy raged on. A victory by Forward Pass in the Belmont Stakes would make him the first Triple Crown winner in twenty years and many fans, experts, and racing commentators felt he would be an illegitimate champion. In the Belmont, Forward Pass finished second by one and a quarter lengths to Greentree Stable's colt Stage Door Johnny, a horse who had not raced in the Derby or the Preakness but had been specifically bred and conditioned for competing at longer distances.

=== Awards ===
In 1968, the Turf and Sports Digest poll saw Forward Pass named as Champion 3-Yr-Old Male. The other two organizations (Thoroughbred Racing Association and Daily Racing Form) voted for Stage Door Johnny.

== Retirement and legacy ==
Retired at the end of the 1968 racing season to Calumet Farm, Forward Pass was sent to stand at stud at Calumet Farm. In 1977, he was sold to a breeding farm in Japan. He died there in 1980.

Even today, controversy and speculation surrounds the 1968 Kentucky Derby. The New York Times calls the ruling the "most controversial decision in all of Triple Crown racing." The use of phenylbutazone was subsequently approved on March 6, 1974, by the Kentucky Racing Commission in recognition of medical research that showed it does not enhance a horse's performance.

== Pedigree ==
Pedigree of Forward Pass
Sire On-and-On bay 1956	Nasrullah bay 1940	Nearco	Pharos
Sire On-and-On bay 1956	Nasrullah bay 1940	Nearco	Nogara
Sire On-and-On bay 1956	Nasrullah bay 1940	Mumtaz Begum	Blenheim
Sire On-and-On bay 1956	Nasrullah bay 1940	Mumtaz Begum	Mumtaz Mahal
Sire On-and-On bay 1956	Two Lea bay 1946	Bull Lea	Bull Dog
Sire On-and-On bay 1956	Two Lea bay 1946	Bull Lea	Rose Leaves
Sire On-and-On bay 1956	Two Lea bay 1946	Two Bob	The Porter
Sire On-and-On bay 1956	Two Lea bay 1946	Two Bob	Blessings
Dam Princess Turia ch. 1953	Heliopolis bay 1936	Hyperion	Gainsborough
Dam Princess Turia ch. 1953	Heliopolis bay 1936	Hyperion	Selene
Dam Princess Turia ch. 1953	Heliopolis bay 1936	Drift	Swynford
Dam Princess Turia ch. 1953	Heliopolis bay 1936	Drift	Santa Cruz
Dam Princess Turia ch. 1953	Blue Delight brown 1938	Blue Larkspur	Black Servant
Dam Princess Turia ch. 1953	Blue Delight brown 1938	Blue Larkspur	Blossom Time
Dam Princess Turia ch. 1953	Blue Delight brown 1938	Chicleight	Chicle
Dam Princess Turia ch. 1953	Blue Delight brown 1938	Chicleight	Ruddy Light

== See also ==
- Country House (horse), declared winner of the 2019 Kentucky Derby following a disqualification
