= 1966 Preakness Stakes =

91st running of the Preakness Stakes

91st Preakness Stakes
- The Preakness Stakes
- Location: Pimlico Race Course, Baltimore, Maryland, United States
- Date: May 21, 1966
- Winning horse: Kauai King
- Jockey: Don Brumfield
- Conditions: Fast
- Surface: Dirt

The 1966 Preakness Stakes was the 91st running of the $200,000 Preakness Stakes thoroughbred horse race. The race took place on May 21, 1966, and was televised in the United States on the CBS television network. Kauai King, who was jockeyed by Don Brumfield, won the race by one and three quarter lengths over runner-up Stupendous. Approximate post time was 5:48 p.m. Eastern Time. The race was run on a fast track in a final time of 1:55-2/5. The Maryland Jockey Club reported total attendance of 36,114, this is recorded as second highest on the list of American thoroughbred racing top attended events for North America in 1966.

== Payout ==
The 91st Preakness Stakes Payout Schedule

Program Number	Horse Name	Win	Place	Show
3	Kauai King	$4.00	$3.00	$2.40
8	Stupendous	-	$3.60	$3.40
6	Amberoid	-	-	$3.80

== The full chart ==
Finish Position	Margin (lengths)	Post Position	Horse name	Jockey	Trainer	Owner	Post Time Odds	Purse Earnings
1st	0	3	Kauai King	Don Brumfield	Henry Forrest	Ford Stable	1.00-1 favorite	$129,800
2nd	13/4	8	Stupendous	Braulio Baeza	Edward A. Neloy	Wheatley Stable	4.70-1	$30,000
3rd	63/4	6	Amberoid	William Boland	Lucien Laurin	Reginald N. Webster	5.40-1	$15,000
4th	93/4	1	Rehabilitate	Ron Turcotte	Robert L. Wheeler	Robert Lehman	43.90-1	$7,500
5th	10	7	Indulto	John L. Rotz	Max Hirsch	Jane Greer	8.30-1	
6th	101/2	4	Advocator	John Sellers	Clyde Troutt	Ada L. Rice	10.20-1	
7th	131/2	2	Exceedingly	Paul Kallai	Joseph P. Considine	Alder Branch Farm	61.80-1	
8th	14	5	Understanding	Tommy Lee	John W. Jacobs	Ethel D. Jacobs	76.10-1	
9th	171/2	9	Blue Skyer	Earlie Fires	James A. Padgett	Marvin J. Padgett	11.50-1	

- Winning Breeder: Pine Brook Farm; (MD)
- Winning Time: 1:55 2/5
- Track Condition: Fast
- Total Attendance: 36,114
