= 1966 Kentucky Derby =

Horse race

92nd Kentucky Derby
- Kentucky Derby
- Grade I stakes race
- Location: Churchill Downs
- Date: May 7, 1966
- Winning horse: Kauai King
- Jockey: Donald Brumfield
- Trainer: Henry Forrest
- Owner: Ford Stable
- Surface: Dirt

The 1966 Kentucky Derby was the 92nd running of the Kentucky Derby. The race took place on May 7, 1966.

== Full results ==
Finished	Post	Horse	Jockey	Trainer	Owner	Time / behind
1st	8	Kauai King	Donald Brumfield	Henry Forrest	Ford Stable (Mike Ford)	
2nd	3	Advocator	Johnny Sellers	Clyde Troutt	Ada L. Rice	
3rd	12	Blue Skyer	Earlie Fires	James A. Padgett	Padgett-Grant	
4th	2	Stupendous	Braulio Baeza	Edward A. Neloy	Wheatley Stable	
5th	9	Abe's Hope	Bill Shoemaker	Delmer W. Carroll Sr.	Grand Prix Stable	
6th	13	Rehabilitate	Ron Turcotte	Ralph G. Kercheval	Robert Lehman	
7th	1	Amberoid	William Boland	Lucien Laurin	Reginald N. Webster	
8th	4	Fleet Shoe	Larry Gilligan	Larry Sterling	George Putnam	
9th	5	Exhibitionist	Eddie Belmonte	Hirsch Jacobs	Ethel D. Jacobs	
10th	6	Sky Guy	Larry Adams	Nick Combest	William G. Helis Jr.	
11th	11	Williamston Kid	Robert Stevenson	James Bartlett	Ternes-Bartlett	
12th	10	Quinta	Paul Kallai	Bernard P. Bond	Bokum II-Scott II	
13th	7	Tragniew	Donald Pierce	Lester Holt	B. J. Richards	
14th	15	Beau Sub	Robert Parrott	Kenneth Bright	Clear Springs Stable	
15th	14	Dominar	William Harmatz	T. Wallace Dunn	Flying M Stable	
