= Out of the Way =

American-bred Thoroughbred racehorse

- Sire: Mamboreta
- Grandsire: Gulf Stream
- Dam: Way Out
- Damsire: Alibhai
- Sex: Stallion
- Foaled: 1965
- Country: United States
- Colour: Dark Brown
- Breeder: King Ranch
- Owner: King Ranch
- Trainer: Max Hirsch
- Record: 28: 6-7-3
- Earnings: $236,337

Major wins
- Jersey Derby (1968); Massachusetts Handicap (1968) American Classic Race placing: Preakness Stakes 2nd (1968)
- Last updated on October 11, 2015

Out of the Way was an American Thoroughbred racehorse. He is best remembered for his runner-up performances in the $200,000 93rd running of The Preakness Stakes to Kentucky Derby winner Forward Pass.

== Background ==
Out of the Way was bred in Kentucky by breeders King Ranch. Out of the Way was sired by Mamboreta and was a grandson of Gulf Stream. He was foaled out of a mare named Way Out who was the progeny of Alibhai.

== Racing career ==
=== Early racing career ===
Trained by Max Hirsch, Out of the Way was very slow to develop, winning only his maiden and one allowance race during his two-year-old season. In April 1968, the owner of Out of the Way, King Ranch, decided to run him in the mile and one eighth Wood Memorial Stakes at Aqueduct Racetrack. He finished fourth to the eventual Kentucky Derby Champion Dancer's Image, who later became the only winner of the Derby to be disqualified. Then in the Withers Stakes, Out of the Way again finished fourth, this time to Call Me Prince, his entry-mate owned by Mrs. Adele L. Rand, also trained by Max Hirsch.

=== 1968 Preakness Stakes ===
On May 18, 1968, Out of the Way was entered into the second jewel of the American Triple Crown, the $200,000 Preakness Stakes, run at a mile and three sixteenths on dirt at Pimlico Race Course in Baltimore, Maryland. Out of the Way was listed on the morning line as a long shot at 15-1 in a field of ten colts. The official Derby winner, Forward Pass, was the even money favorite at 1-1 with the disqualified Derby winner, Dancer's Image, slightly higher but also listed at even money at 1-1. Out of the Way broke ninth out of ten under jockey John L. Rotz. He lost ground around both turns by in the middle of the track. Going into Pimlico's famous "Clubhouse Turn," he moved up slightly into seventh. Out of the Way continued in the outside paths while improving to fifth going down the backstretch. Fractions on the front end of the race were fast. The leaders finished the first quarter in :23 seconds flat and the half in :471/5. After 3/4 of a mile, Nodouble led the race by a head in front of Forward Pass, who was a head in front of 88-1 long shot Martin's Jig. The top three were within half a length of each other.

Out of the Way was on the outside around the final turn, within striking distance of the leaders. At the top of the stretch, he closed steadily with every stride but could not catch the leader, Forward Pass, who won by six lengths Out of the Way came in second by a head over Dancer's Image to take home 20% of the purse, which equaled $30,000. Dancer's Image was again disqualified, here, from third to eighth place for bothering Martin's Jig.

=== Late three-year-old season ===
In his next start, Out Of The Way won the Jersey Derby at a mile and one eighth at Garden State Park Racetrack in Cherry Hill, New Jersey, beating Captain's Gig and Iron Ruler. Out Of The Way then beat older horses winning the Massachusetts Handicap at Suffolk Downs over Big rock Candy and King's Palace at a mile and a quarter. He followed that up with two runner-up performances to Stage Door Johnny in the mile Saranac Stakes at Saratoga Race Course in upstate New York and in the mile and a quarter Dwyer Stakes at Aqueduct Racetrack in South Ozone Park in Queens, New York. He then was out of the money in the Travers Stakes to 14-1 Chompion who upset Forward Pass by one and three-quarter lengths on the sloppy track. His fortunes declined thereafter and was winless at 4 and 5 (8 starts).
