= 1958 Kentucky Derby =

Horse race

84th Kentucky Derby
- Kentucky Derby
- Grade I stakes race
- Location: Churchill Downs
- Date: May 3, 1958
- Winning horse: Tim Tam
- Jockey: Ismael Valenzuela
- Trainer: Horace A. Jones
- Owner: Calumet Farm
- Surface: Dirt

The 1958 Kentucky Derby was the 84th running of the Kentucky Derby. The race took place on May 3, 1958.

== Full results ==
| Finished | Post | Horse | Jockey | Trainer | Owner | Time / behind |
|---|---|---|---|---|---|---|
| 1st | 3 | Tim Tam | Ismael Valenzuela | Horace A. Jones | Calumet Farm | 2:05 0/0 |
| 2nd | 7 | Lincoln Road | Chris Rogers | Victor J. Sovinski | Sunny Blue Farm (Isaac Blumberg) | |
| 3rd | 10 | Noureddin | Jimmy Combest | James H. Pierce | Crabgrass Stable (Peter Graffagnino) | |
| 4th | 1 | Jewel's Reward | Eddie Arcaro | Ivan H. Parke | Maine Chance Farm | |
| 5th | 5 | Martins Rullah | Conn McCreary | Eugene Jacobs | Mr. & Mrs. George Lewis | |
| 6th | 9 | Chance It Tony | Logan Batcheller | Willie Manzi | Mrs. Anthony Cannuli | |
| 7th | 8 | A Dragon Killer | Lawrence Hansman | Norman L. Haymaker | Mrs. S. Helene Sadacca | |
| 8th | 4 | Gone Fishin' | Ralph Neves | Charles E. Whittingham | Llangollen Farm Stable | |
| 9th | 14 | Benedicto | Robert Dever | Walter Coleman | Bellardi & Harkins | |
| 10th | 1A | Ebony Pearl | Manuel Ycaza | Ivan H. Parke | Maine Chance Farm | |
| 11th | 12 | Red Hot Pistol | Douglas Dodson | John W. Fernandez | Mrs. Sam E. Wilson Jr. | |
| 12th | 11 | Silky Sullivan | Bill Shoemaker | Reggie Cornell | Tom Ross & Phil Klipstein | |
| 13th | 6 | Flamingo | Gordon Glisson | Sylvester Veitch | Cornelius Vanderbilt Whitney | |
| 14th | 2 | Warren G. | Kenneth Church | Harry Saladin | William G. Reynolds | |

- Winning breeder: Calumet Farm (KY)
