= 1958 Preakness Stakes =

83rd running of the Preakness Stakes

83rd Preakness Stakes
- The Preakness Stakes
- Location: Pimlico Race Course, Baltimore, Maryland, United States
- Date: May 17, 1958
- Winning horse: Tim Tam
- Jockey: Ismael Valenzuela
- Conditions: Fast
- Surface: Dirt

The 1958 Preakness Stakes was the 83rd running of the $150,000 Preakness Stakes thoroughbred horse race. The race took place on May 17, 1958, and was televised in the United States on the CBS television network. Tim Tam, who was jockeyed by Ismael Valenzuela, won the race by one and one half lengths over runner-up Lincoln Road. Approximate post time was 5:50 p.m. Eastern Time. The race was run on a fast track in a final time of 1:571/5 The Maryland Jockey Club reported total attendance of 36,912, this is recorded as second highest on the list of American thoroughbred racing top attended events for North America in 1958.

== Payout ==
The 83rd Preakness Stakes Payout Schedule

Program Number	Horse Name	Win	Place	Show
8	Tim Tam	$4.20	$2.80	$2.20
10	Lincoln Road	-	$4.80	$3.40
11	Gone Fishin'	-	-	$4.80

== The full chart ==
Finish Position	Margin (lengths)	Post Position	Horse name	Jockey	Trainer	Owner	Post Time Odds	Purse Earnings
1st	0	8	Tim Tam	Ismael Valenzuela	Horace A. Jones	Calumet Farm	1.10-1 favorite	$98,950
2nd	1 1/2	10	Lincoln Road	Chris Rogers	Sylvester Veitch	Sunny Blue Farm (Isaac Blumberg)	8.50-1	$20,000
3rd	5	11	Gone Fishin'	Ralph Neves	Charlie Whittingham	Llangollen Farm Stable	18.40-1	$10,000
4th	5 1/4	2	Plion	Steve Brooks	Tom Jolley	Edward G. Potter Jr.	125.50-1	$5,000
5th	6 3/4	6	Noureddin	Jimmy Combest	Joseph H. Pierce Jr.	Crabgrass Stable	9.30-1	
6th	8 3/4	1	Talent Show	William Lester	Clyde Troutt	Ada L. Rice	62.40-1	
7th	12 1/4	5	Jewel's Reward	Manuel Ycaza	Ivan H. Parke	Maine Chance Farm	3.10-1	
8th	14 3/4	4	Silky Sullivan	Bill Shoemaker	Reggie Cornell	Tom Ross & Phil Klipstein	6.40-1	
9th	16	7	Chance It Tony	Logan Batcheller	William Mianzi	Mrs. Anthony Cannuli	204.90-1	
10th	16 1/2	9	Martin's Rullah	Karl Korte	Eugene Jacobs	George E. Lewis	94.80-1	
11th	21 1/2	3	Michore	Ellis Gray	James W. Hechter	Powhatan Stable	228.60-1	
12th	33 1/2	11	Liberty Ruler	Anthony DeSpirito	Ivan H. Parke	Maine Chance Farm	3.10-1	

- Winning Breeder: Calumet Farm; (KY)
- Winning Time: 1:57 2/5
- Track Condition: Fast
- Total Attendance: 36,912
