= Phenylbutazone =

Nonsteroidal anti-inflammatory drug (NSAID)

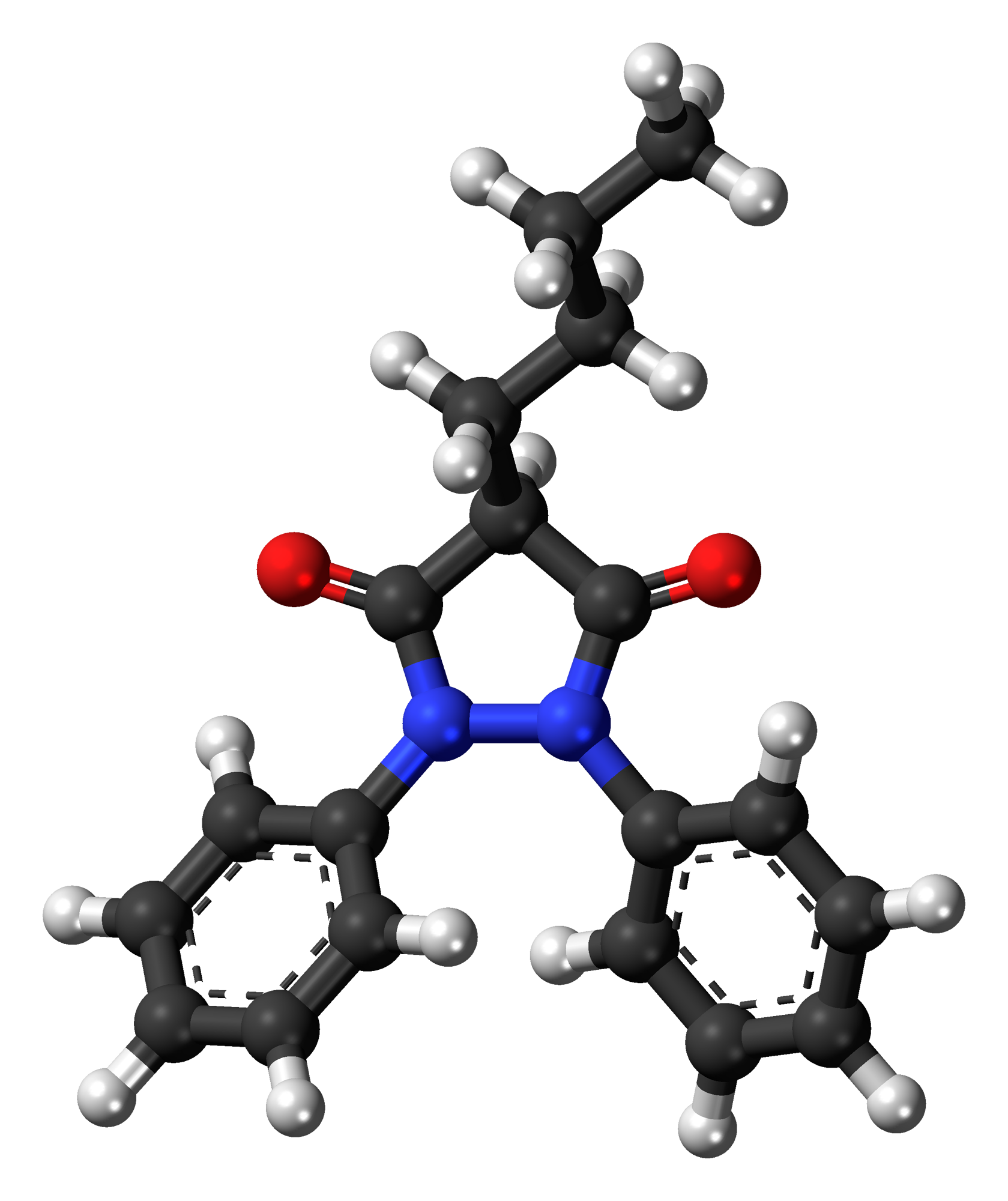

Clinical data
- Trade names: Butazolidine
- ATC code: M01AA01 (WHO) M02AA01 (WHO)

Legal status
- Legal status: In general: ℞ (Prescription only)

Identifiers
- IUPAC name: 4-Butyl-1,2-diphenyl-pyrazolidine-3,5-dione
- CAS Number: 50-33-9
- PubChem CID: 4781
- IUPHAR/BPS: 7270
- DrugBank: DB00812
- ChemSpider: 4617
- UNII: GN5P7K3T8S
- KEGG: D00510
- ChEBI: CHEBI:48574
- ChEMBL: ChEMBL101
- CompTox Dashboard (EPA): DTXSID9021136
- ECHA InfoCard: 100.000.027

Chemical and physical data
- Formula: C_{19}H_{20}N_{2}O_{2}
- Molar mass: 308.381 g·mol^{−1}
- 3D model (JSmol): Interactive image
- SMILES: O=C2N(c1ccccc1)N(C(=O)C2CCCC)c3ccccc3
- InChI: InChI=1S/C19H20N2O2/c1-2-3-14-17-18(22)20(15-10-6-4-7-11-15)21(19(17)23)16-12-8-5-9-13-16/h4-13,17H,2-3,14H2,1H3; Key:VYMDGNCVAMGZFE-UHFFFAOYSA-N

Phenylbutazone, often referred to as "bute", is a nonsteroidal anti-inflammatory drug (NSAID) for the short-term treatment of pain and fever in animals.

In the United States and United Kingdom, it is no longer approved for human use (except in the United Kingdom for ankylosing spondylitis), as it can cause severe adverse effects such as suppression of white blood cell production and aplastic anemia. This drug was implicated in the 2013 meat adulteration scandal. Positive phenylbutazone tests in horse meat were uncommon in the UK, however.

== Uses ==
=== In humans ===
Phenylbutazone was originally made available for use in humans for the treatment of rheumatoid arthritis and gout in 1949. However, it is no longer approved, and therefore not marketed, for any human use in the United States. In the UK it is used to treat ankylosing spondylitis, but only when other therapies are unsuitable.

=== In horses ===
Phenylbutazone is the most commonly used NSAID for horses in the United States. It is used for the following purposes:

- Analgesia: It is used for pain relief from infections and musculoskeletal disorders, including sprains, overuse injuries, tendinitis, arthralgias, arthritis, and laminitis. Like other NSAIDs, it acts directly on musculoskeletal tissue to control inflammation, thereby reducing secondary inflammatory damage, alleviating pain, and restoring range of motion. It does not cure musculoskeletal ailments or work well on colic pain.
- Antipyresis: It is used for reduction of fevers. Its antipyretic qualities may mask other symptoms.

==== History of phenylbutazone in racing ====
In the 1968 Kentucky Derby, Dancer's Image, the winner of the race, was disqualified after traces of phenylbutazone were allegedly discovered in a post-race urinalysis. Owned by prominent Massachusetts businessman Peter D. Fuller and ridden by jockey Bobby Ussery, Dancer's Image was the first horse to win the Kentucky Derby and then be disqualified. Phenylbutazone was legal on most tracks around the United States in 1968, but had not yet been approved by Churchill Downs.

Controversy and speculation still surround the incident. In the weeks prior to the race, Fuller had given previous winnings to Coretta Scott King, the widow of slain civil rights activist Martin Luther King Jr., which brought both praise and criticism. The previous year, King held a sit-in against housing discrimination which disrupted Derby week. Forty years later, Fuller still believed Dancer's Image was disqualified due to these events.

Although Forward Pass had been named the winner, after many appeals the Kentucky Derby official website lists both Dancer's Image and Forward Pass as the winner. The website's race video commentary states that on the winner's plaque at Churchill Downs, both Dancer's Image and Forward Pass are listed as the 1968 winner of the Kentucky Derby.

=== In dogs ===
Phenylbutazone is occasionally used in dogs for the longer-term management of chronic pain, particularly due to osteoarthritis. About 20% of adult dogs are affected with osteoarthritis, which makes the management of musculoskeletal pain a major component of companion animal practice. The margin of safety for all NSAIDs is narrow in the dog, and other NSAIDs are more commonly used (etodolac, and carprofen). Gastrointestinal-protectant drugs, such as misoprostol, cimetidine, omeprazole, ranitidine, or sucralfate, are frequently included as a part of treatment with any NSAID. Dogs receiving chronic phenylbutazone therapy should be followed with regular blood work and renal monitoring.

Side effects of phenylbutazone in dogs include gastrointestinal (GI) ulceration, bone marrow depression, rashes, malaise, blood dyscrasias, and diminished renal blood flow.

== Dosage and administration in horses ==
Phenylbutazone has a plasma elimination half-life of 4–8 hours, however the inflammatory exudate half life is 24 hours, so single daily dosing can be sufficient, although it is often used twice per day. The drug is considered fairly non-toxic when given at appropriate doses (2.2-4.4 mg/kg/day), even when used repeatedly. This dose has been doubled for diseases that cause severe pain, such as laminitis, but is toxic if repeated long-term, and exceptionally high doses (15 mg/kg/d or higher) can kill the animal in less than a week.

Phenylbutazone can be administered orally (via paste, powder or feed-in) or intravenously. It should not be given intramuscularly or injected in any place other than a vein, as it can cause tissue damage. Tissue damage and edema may also occur if the drug is injected repetitively into the same vein.

== Side effects and disadvantages ==
Side effects of phenylbutazone are similar to those of other NSAIDs. Overdose or prolonged use can cause gastrointestinal ulcers, blood dyscrasia, kidney damage (primarily dose-dependant renal papillary necrosis), oral lesions if given by mouth, and internal hemorrhage. This is especially pronounced in young, ill, or stressed horses which are less able to metabolize the drug. Effects of gastrointestinal damage include edema of the legs and belly secondary to leakage of blood proteins into the intestines, resulting in decreased appetite, excessive thirst, weight loss, weakness, and in advanced stages, kidney failure and death. Phenylbutazone can also cause agranulocytosis.

Phenylbutazone amplifies the anticoagulant effect of vitamin K antagonists such as warfarin or phenprocoumon. Phenylbutazone displaces warfarin from plasma binding sites, and toxic blood levels leading to haemorrhage can occur. It may aggravate kidney or liver problems.

Phenylbutazone may be toxic to the embryo and can be transferred via the umbilical cord and by milk.

Phenylbutazone can be used in foals. Premature foals, septicemic foals, foals with questionable kidney or liver function and foals with diarrhea require careful monitoring. Drugs to protect the GI tract such as omeprazole, cimetidine, and sucralfate are frequently used with phenylbutazone.

High doses of phenylbutazone may be considered a rules violation under some equestrian organizations, as the drug may remain in the bloodstream four to five days after administration.

The International Agency for Research on Cancer places it in Group 3; i.e., "not classifiable as to its carcinogenicity to humans".

Use in horses is limited to those not intended for food. Metabolites of phenylbutazone can cause aplastic anaemia in humans.

== Investigations into potential carcinogenicity ==
Opinions are conflicting regarding the carcinogenicity of phenylbutazone in animals; no evidence indicates it causes cancer in humans at therapeutic doses. Maekawa et al. (1987) found no increased cancer incidence in DONRYU rats fed a diet containing 0.125% or 0.25% phenylbutazone over two years. On the other hand, Kari et al. (1995) found a rare type of kidney cancer in rats (13 of 100) and an increased rate of liver cancer in male rats fed 150 and 300 mg/kg body weight of phenylbutazone for two years. Tennant (1993) listed phenylbutazone as a non-mutagenic carcinogen. Kirkland and Fowler (2010) acknowledged that, while phenylbutazone is not predicted to be a mutagen by computer software that simulates the chemicals interaction with DNA, one laboratory study indicated phenylbutazone subtly altered the structure of chromosomes of bone marrow cells of mice. Kirkland and Fowler (2010) furthermore explained that the theoretical carcinogenic effects of phenylbutazone in humans cannot be studied because patients prescribed the drug were given doses far below the level any effect may become apparent (<1 mM). The World Health Organization's International Agency For Research On Cancer (IARC) stated in 1987 that there was inadequate evidence for a carcinogenic effect in humans.

== Interactions ==
Other anti-inflammatory drugs that tend to cause GI ulcers, such as corticosteroids and other NSAIDs, can potentiate the bleeding risk. Combination with anticoagulant drugs, particularly coumarin derivatives, also increases the risk of bleeding. Avoid combining with other hepatotoxic drugs.

Phenylbutazone may affect blood levels and duration of action of phenytoin, valproic acid, sulfonamides, sulfonylurea antidiabetic agents, barbiturates, promethazine, rifampicin, chlorpheniramine, diphenhydramine, and penicillin G.

== Overdose ==
Overdoses of phenylbutazone can cause kidney failure, liver injury, bone marrow suppression, and gastric ulceration or perforation. Early signs of toxicity include loss of appetite, and depression.

== Chemistry ==
Phenylbutazone is a crystalline substance. It is obtained by condensation of diethyl n-butylmalonate with hydrazobenzene in the presence of base. In effect, this represents the formation of the heterocyclic system by simple lactamization.

Hydrazobenzene

Diethyl n-butylmalonate

Oxyphenbutazone, the major metabolite of phenylbutazone, differs only in the para location of one of its phenyl groups, where a hydrogen atom is replaced by a hydroxyl group (making it 4-butyl-1-(4-hydroxyphenyl)-2-phenyl-3,5-pyrazolidinedione).

== See also ==
- Metamizole
