= Lincoln Road (horse) =

American-bred Thoroughbred racehorse

- Sire: With Pleasure
- Grandsire: He Did
- Dam: Efficiency
- Damsire: Sweep All
- Sex: Stallion
- Foaled: 1955
- Country: United States
- Colour: Dark brown
- Breeder: Tilford Wilson and CT Houston
- Owner: Sunny Blue Farm
- Trainer: Vic Sovinski
- Record: 17: 3-6-3
- Earnings: US$128,375

Major wins
- Jersey Derby (1958); American Classic Race placing: Kentucky Derby 2nd (1958); Preakness Stakes 2nd (1958)

Lincoln Road (foaled in 1955) was an American Thoroughbred racehorse who won the 1958 Jersey Derby as a three-year-old. The son of With Pleasure is best remembered for his runner-up finishes in the 1958 Kentucky Derby and Preakness Stakes.

== Racing career ==
Lincoln Road was owned by Chicago businessman Isaac Blumberg who raced the colt under the nom de course Sunny Blue Farm. Bloomberg and his trainer Vic Sovinski came back two years later to win the 1960 Kentucky Derby with Venetian Way.

As a two-year-old, Lincoln Road broke his maiden in his third attempt and would win 2 of 7 starts. In 1958, at 3, he finished second seven times. In February, he placed second to Yemen in the Hutcheson Stakes at Gulfstream Park at seven furlongs. In April, he stretched out to a mile and one eighth and led most of the way but was caught at the wire and finished second again. This time he lost to Calumet Farm's Tim Tam in the Florida Derby, also at Gulfstream. Calumet Farm-owned Tim Tam went on to become a Dual Classic Winner and win divisional honors as the American Champion Three-Year-Old Male Horse. Next, in the Biscayne Bay Handicap, the favored Lincoln Road finished second to Belleau Chief, the same rival to whom he would finish third in the Stepping Stone Purse at Churchill Downs. Finishing fourth in that race was Silky Sullivan. On the first Saturday in May, Lincoln Road finished second again to Tim Tam in the Kentucky Derby at Churchill Downs.

Two weeks later, Lincoln Road was listed as the fourth choice in a field of twelve stakes-winning colts in the second jewel of the Triple Crown, the 83rd running of Preakness Stakes at Pimlico Race Course in Baltimore, Maryland, on May 17, 1958. Derby winner Tim Tam was listed as even money, Jewel's Reward was 3:1, closer Silky Sullivan was third choice at 6:1, and Lincoln Road was listed at 8:1. Starting from post position ten, Lincoln Road broke well and set fast fractions on the lead of :23 flat, :46-2/5 and 1:11-3/5. He led by a half length rounding the clubhouse turn and then drew clear down the backstretch by two lengths. Around the final turn, he was heavily restrained by jockey C. Rogers but widened his lead to three lengths. In the stretch, Tim Tam bore down and won by one and a quarter lengths. Lincoln Road finished three and a half lengths in front of third-place finisher Gone Fishin.

After his Triple Crown exploits, Lincoln Road would earn his stakes win with a front-running victory in the Jersey Derby over Talent Show. In his next start, he would lose in a photo to Terra Firma in the Stars And Stripes Handicap at Arlington Park in Chicago, Illinois. Never out of the money at three in 10 starts, his racing career was now over.
