= Widener Handicap =

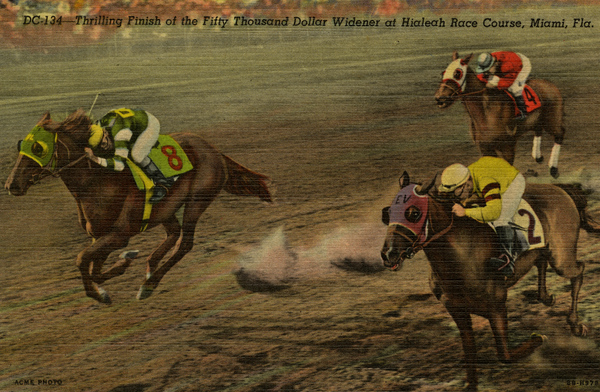
- Postcard depicting the finish of the 1948 Widener Handicap
- Class: Defunct Stakes
- Location: Hialeah Park Race Track; Hialeah, Florida, United States
- Inaugurated: 1936–2001
- Race type: Thoroughbred – Flat racing
- Website: N/A

Race information
- Distance: 1 1/8 miles (9.0 furlongs)
- Surface: Dirt
- Track: Left-handed
- Qualification: Three-years-old & up
- Weight: Handicap
- Purse: $200,000

The Widener Handicap at Hialeah Park Race Track in Hialeah, Florida was a Grade III stakes race for Thoroughbred racehorses 3-years-old and up. It was run over a distance of 1 1/4 miles (10 furlongs) until 1993 when it was modified to 1 1/8 miles. Initially called the Widener Challenge Cup Handicap, the race was named for Hialeah Park owner Joseph E. Widener. It was first run in 1936 as the East Coast counterpart to the Santa Anita Handicap in California.

The magnificence of the Hialeah Park facilities drew the rich and famous to the track and a purse of $50,000 quickly made the Widener Handicap one of the major events of the winter racing season, drawing many of the country's top horses. The March 16, 1942 issue of TIME magazine said: "nearly every glamor horse in the U.S. was entered in Florida's Widener Handicap, richest race of the winter season."

In 1973 the Thoroughbred Owners and Breeders Association began the grading of races and the Widener Handicap was given Grade I status, the highest designation. The Widener Handicap was a Grade 1 race in 1989 when financial difficulties saw racing at Hialeah Park suspended. On resumption in 1992, the race lost its graded stakes status but earned back a Grade III ranking in 1994 and remained at that until its final running in 2001.

In 2000, the Widener Handicap was run at Gulfstream Park then returned to Hialeah Park in 2001. At the end of that year, financial difficulties spelled the demise of Hialeah Park and with it the Widener Handicap.

When Mary Russ won the 1982 Widener Handicap it marked the first time in the history of North American Thoroughbred racing that a female jockey won a Grade I event.

Three horses won the Widener twice and all were owned by Calumet Farm who won this race eight times, more than any other owner.

== Record holders ==
Speed record:

- At 1 1/8 miles: 1:45.52 – Albert the Great (2001)
- At 1 1/4 miles: 1:58.60 – Turkoman (1986)

Most wins:

- 2 – Armed (1946,1947)
- 2 – Bardstown (1957,1959)
- 2 – Yorky (1961, 1962)

Most wins by a jockey:

- 4 – Pat Day (1996, 1997, 1998, 1999)

Most wins by a trainer:

- 5 – Horace A. Jones (1949, 1957, 1959, 1961, 1962)

Most wins by an owner:

- 8 – Calumet Farm (1939, 1946, 1947, 1949, 1957, 1959, 1961, 1962)

== Winners ==
Year	Winner	Age	Jockey	Trainer	Owner	Dist.	Time
2001	Albert the Great	4	Jorge Chavez	Nick Zito	Tracy Farmer	1-1/8	1:45.52
2000	Blazing Sword †	6	Javier Castellano	Kathleen O'Connell	Gilbert G. Campbell	1-1/8	1:51.73
1999	Golden Missile	4	Pat Day	Patrick B. Byrne	Frank Stronach	1-1/8	1:47.73
1998	Frisk Me Now	4	Pat Day	Robert J. Durso	Carol R. Dender	1-1/8	1:47.44
1997	Tejano Run	5	Pat Day	Kenneth G. McPeek	Roy K. Monroe	1-1/8	1:48.35
1996	Mecke	4	Pat Day	Emanuel Tortora	James R. Lewis Jr.	1-1/8	1:52.03
1995	Party Manners	4	Shane Sellers	C. R. McGaughey III	Ogden Mills Phipps	1-1/8	1:47.33
1994	West By West	5	Jean-Luc Samyn	George R. Arnold II	John H. Peace	1-1/8	1:49.98
1993	Honest Ensign	5	Pedro Rodriguez	Guillaume Soyer	Navair Stable (Clarence Hill Jr.)	1-1/8	1:48.80
1992	Race not held						
1991	Sports View	4	Chris Antley	D. Wayne Lukas	Edward A. Cox Jr. et al.	1-1/4	2:02.58
1990	Race not held						
1989	Cryptoclearance	5	José A. Santos	Flint S. Schulhofer	Philip Teinowitz	1-1/4	1:59.40
1988	Personal Flag	5	Randy Romero	C. R. McGaughey III	Ogden Phipps	1-1/4	2:01.80
1987	Launch a Pegasus	5	Jorge Velásquez	Lawrence W. Jennings	Pegasus Racing Stable	1-1/4	2:01.60
1986	Turkoman	4	Chris McCarron	Gary F. Jones	Saron Stable (Corbin Robertson)	1-1/4	1:58.60
1985	Pine Circle	4	Don MacBeth	C. R. McGaughey III	Loblolly Stable	1-1/4	2:00.40
1984	Mat-Boy	5	Jorge Valdivieso	Carlos Mancero	Noroma Stable (Argentine partnership)	1-1/4	1:59.80
1983	Swing Till Dawn	4	Craig Perret	Chuck Marikian	Paniolo Ranch et al. (Sherwood Chillingworth) et al.	1-1/4	2:01.20
1982	Lord Darnley	4	Mary L. Russ	Roger Laurin	George F. Getty II	1-1/4	2:02.40
1981	Land of Eire	6	Earlie Fires	Joseph S. Nash	C. V. Collins	1-1/4	2:01.00
1980	Private Account	4	Jeffrey Fell	Angel Penna Sr.	Ogden Phipps	1-1/4	2:03.20
1979	Jumping Hill	7	Jeffrey Fell	Horatio Luro	El Peco Ranch (George A. Pope Jr.)	1-1/4	2:03.00
1978	Silver Series	4	Ángel Cordero Jr.	Oscar Dishman Jr.	Dr. Archie R. Donaldson	1-1/4	2:02.20
1977	Yamanin	5	Garth Patterson	George T. Poole	Hajime Doi	1-1/4	2:01.20
1976	Hatchet Man	5	Heliodoro Gustines	John M. Gaver Sr.	Greentree Stable	1-1/4	2:02.00
1975	Forego	5	Heliodoro Gustines	Sherrill W. Ward	Lazy F Ranch	1-1/4	2:01.80
1974	Forego	4	Heliodoro Gustines	Sherrill W. Ward	Lazy F Ranch	1-1/4	2:01.20
1973	Vertee	4	John Ruane	H. Allen Jerkens	Hobeau Farm	1-1/4	2:00.80
1972	Good Counsel	4	Ángel Cordero Jr.	Lou Rondinello	Darby Dan Farm	1-1/4	2:02.60
1971	True North	5	Robert Woodhouse	George T. Poole	C. V. Whitney	1-1/4	2:03.80
1970	Never Bow	4	Eddie Belmonte	H. Allen Jerkens	Hobeau Farm	1-1/4	2:01.00
1969	Yumbel	8	Fernando Toro	Julian Serna Jr.	Walnut Hill Farm	1-1/4	2:03.20
1968	Sette Bello	6	Earlie Fires	James P. Conway	Robert Lehman	1-1/4	2:01.60
1967	Ring Twice	4	William Boland	Bert Mulholland	George D. Widener Jr.	1-1/4	2:00.60
1966	Pia Star	5	Johnny Sellers	Clyde Troutt	Ada L. Rice	1-1/4	2:01.60
1965	Primordial	8	Sandino Hernandez	Santiago L. Ledwith	Santiago L. Ledwith	1-1/4	2:03.60
1964	Mongo	5	Wayne Chambers	Frank A. Bonsal	Marion duPont Scott	1-1/4	2:01.20
1963	Beau Purple	6	William Boland	H. Allen Jerkens	Hobeau Farm	1-1/4	2:01.80
1962	Yorky	5	Steve Brooks	Horace A. Jones	Calumet Farm	1-1/4	2:02.00
1961	Yorky	4	Johnny Sellers	Horace A. Jones	Calumet Farm	1-1/4	2:01.00
1960	Bald Eagle	5	Manuel Ycaza	Cain Hoy Stable	Woody Stephens	1-1/4	1:59.60
1959	Bardstown	7	Steve Brooks	Horace A. Jones	Calumet Farm	1-1/4	2:01.20
1958	Oligarchy	4	Sam Boulemetis	J. Elliott Burch	Brookmeade Stable	1-1/4	2:01.40
1957	Bardstown	5	Bill Hartack	Horace A. Jones	Calumet Farm	1-1/4	2:03.00
1956	Nashua	4	Eddie Arcaro	James E. Fitzsimmons	Belair Stud	1-1/4	2:02.00
1955	Hasty Road	4	John Adams	Harry Trotsek	Hasty House Farm	1-1/4	2:02.40
1954	Landlocked	4	John Heckmann	Robert L. Dotter	James Cox Brady Jr.	1-1/4	2:03.20
1953	Oil Capitol	6	Conn McCreary	Harry Trotsek	Hasty House Farm & Cora Trotsek	1-1/4	2:02.40
1952	Spartan Valor	4	James Stout	Frank Catrone	William G. Helis Jr.	1-1/4	2:03.20
1951	Sunglow	4	Douglas Dodson	Preston M. Burch	Brookmeade Stable	1-1/4	2:02.20
1950	Royal Governor	6	Chris Rogers	James E. Ryan	Esther du Pont Weir	1-1/4	2:06.00
1949	Coaltown	4	Ted Atkinson	Horace A. Jones	Calumet Farm	1-1/4	2:02.00
1948	El Mono	4	Porter Roberts	Roscoe Troxler	Daniel Lamont	1-1/4	2:01.00
1947	Armed	6	Douglas Dodson	Ben A. Jones	Calumet Farm	1-1/4	2:01.60
1946	Armed	5	Douglas Dodson	Ben A. Jones	Calumet Farm	1-1/4	2:02.40
1945	Race not held						
1944	Four Freedoms	4	Eddie Arcaro	John M. Gaver Sr.	Greentree Stable	1-1/4	2:04.60
1943	Race not held						
1942	The Rhymer	4	Eddie Arcaro	John M. Gaver Sr.	Greentree Stable	1-1/4	2:05.20
1941	Big Pebble	5	George Seabo	William B. Finnegan	Circle M. Ranch (Edward S. Moore)	1-1/4	2:02.80
1940	Many Stings	5	Ruperto Donoso	Mose Shapoff	Le Mar Stock Farm	1-1/4	2:03.00
1939	Bull Lea	4	Irving Anderson	Frank J. Kearns	Calumet Farm	1-1/4	2:02.40
1938	War Admiral	4	Charles Kurtsinger	George Conway	Glen Riddle Farm	1-1/4	2:03.80
1937	Columbiana	4	Hubert LeBlanc	William J. Hirsch	William J. Hirsch	1-1/4	2:02.00
1936	Mantagna	4	Eddie Litzenberger	George E. Phillips	William H. Furst	1-1/4	2:01.80

- † In 2000 Lemon Drop Kid finished 1st but was disqualified to 4th for interference.
