= Chris Rogers (jockey) =

Canadian jockey

Personal information
- Born: October 6, 1924 Hamilton, Ontario, Canada
- Died: October 29, 1976 (aged 52)
- Occupation: Jockey

Horse racing career
- Sport: Horse racing
- Career wins: 2,043

Major racing wins
- Cup and Saucer Stakes (1943, 1949); Jockey Club Cup Handicap (1944); Victoria Stakes (1944, 1950, 1969); Durham Cup Stakes (1945); Plate Trial Stakes (1945, 1949); Jamaica Handicap (1949); Grey Stakes (1950, 1969, 1976); Widener Handicap (1950); Camden Handicap (1951); Fleetwing Handicap (1953); Vandal Stakes (1957); Colin Stakes (1957); Black-Eyed Susan Stakes (1958); Jersey Derby (1958); Bahamas Stakes (1959); Flamingo Stakes (1959); Lamplighter Handicap (1960); Display Stakes (1961); Seaway Stakes (1962, 1969); Natalma Stakes (1969); Princess Elizabeth Stakes (1969); Shady Well Stakes (1969); Swynford Stakes (1970); Selene Stakes (1970); Col. R.S. McLaughlin Handicap (1974); Clarendon Stakes (1976); Canadian Classic Race wins: Queen's Plate (1949, 1950, 1954)

Racing awards
- Sovereign Award for Outstanding Jockey (1976); Avelino Gomez Memorial Award (1988)

Honours
- Canadian Horse Racing Hall of Fame (1977)

Significant horses
- Epic, Piet, Kingarvie, Puss'n Boots, Lincoln Road, Fanfreluche

Christopher J. Rogers (October 6, 1924 – October 29, 1976) was a Canadian Horse Racing Hall of Fame jockey about whom the great U.S. Racing Hall of Fame inductee Eddie Arcaro called "one of the most complete riders he had ridden against or watched." According to the Canadian Horse Racing Hall of Fame, "Many horsemen consider Rogers the best jockey produced in Canada."

Rogers went on to win 2,043 races in his career including numerous important graded stakes races in Canada. He won that country's most prestigious race, the Queen's Plate, three times: with Epic in 1949, McGill in 1950 and Cosllisteo in 1954. In 1958 Rogers guided longshot Lincoln Road to victory in the Jersey Derby and to second-place finishes in the Kentucky Derby and the Preakness Stakes behind the future U.S. Hall of Fame colt, Tim Tam.

Chris Rogers died of lung cancer in 1976 and the following year was inducted in Canadian Horse Racing Hall of Fame. In 1988 he was also recognized with the Avelino Gomez Memorial Award for his significant contributions to the sport of horse racing.
