= Tropical Park Race Track =

Horse racing facility in Coral Gables, Florida

Coordinates: 25.729453°N 80.320208°W

- Interactive map of Tropical Park Race Track
- Location: Coral Gables, Florida
- Owned by: Frank Bruen and Samuel Bronfman (founders)
- Date opened: 1931–1972
- Course type: Flat

Tropical Park Race Track was a horse racing facility built on 245 acres (0.99 km^{2}) at the current intersection of Bird Road and the Palmetto Expressway in Southwest Dade Miami part of metropolitan Miami, Florida and what is now Olympia Heights. The race track was built by Bill Dwyer, a prohibition era bootlegger, and Frank Bruen with backing from Canadian distilling tycoon, Samuel Bronfman. It opened on December 26, 1931, and closed January 15, 1972. The track hosted meets for both for Thoroughbred and Standardbred horses.

Tropical Park introduced the first synthetic racetrack surface for horse racing in the 1966–67 season. Known as "Tartan Turf, " it was a rubberized surface manufactured by the 3M company. Built inside the regular dirt track, one race per day was contested on the Tartan track but for safety reasons the majority of horse trainers and owners refused to run their horses on the track.

Saul Silberman bought Tropical Park in 1953 after president Henry L. Straus died in a plane crash. A major gambler from Cleveland, Ohio, Silberman was a former majority shareholder of the Cleveland Browns of the National Football League who had also owned Randall Park Race Track in North Randall, Ohio and the Painesville Raceway in Northfield, Ohio. When Silberman died in 1971, new owner William L. McKnight made his intentions known. He wanted to close the track and have all of the racing dates switched to the new Calder Race Course, in which he was a principal investor. Tropical Park was closed after the 1972 racing season.

In 1979, the Miami-Dade County Parks and Recreation service converted the facility into a public park they named Tropical Park. The park offers a number of sports activities including Tropical Park Stadium used for track and field athletics. The old racetrack's stables were used as part of the park's equestrian center.

== Thoroughbred stakes races at Tropical Park ==
- Tropical Park Derby
- Tropical Park Handicap
- Tropical Park Oaks
