= Thinking Cap =

American Thoroughbred racehorse

- Sire: Rosemont
- Grandsire: The Porter
- Dam: Camargo
- Damsire: Heliopolis
- Sex: Stallion
- Foaled: 1952
- Died: 1976 (aged 23–24)
- Country: United States
- Color: Bay
- Breeder: Christiana Stables
- Owner: Christiana Stables
- Trainer: Henry S. Clark
- Record: 59: 13-8-8
- Earnings: US$208,415

Major wins
- Pimlico Futurity (1954); Travers Stakes (1955); Lawrence Realization Stakes (1955); Stymie Handicap (1956); Merchants' and Citizens' Handicap (1956); Southampton Handicap (1957)

Thinking Cap (1952–1976) was an American Thoroughbred racehorse who successfully competed in major races from one mile to more than two miles.

== Background ==
Out of the Heliopolis mare Camargo, Thinking Cap was sired by Rosemont who in turn was sired by the 1937 Leading sire in North America, The Porter.

Bred and raced by the Christiana Stables of Harry Lunger and his wife Jane du Pont Lunger, Thinking Cap was trained by U. S. Hall of Fame inductee Henry S. Clark.

== Racing career ==
In his first year of racing at age two, Douglas Dodson rode Thinking Cap to his most important win in the 1954 Pimlico Futurity. Run over a muddy track, it would prove to be a surface he would do exceptionally well on throughout his career.

Ridden by jockey Paul Bailey, Thinking Cap won two of the top stakes for 3-year-olds over muddy tracks, taking the Travers Stakes in August and the Lawrence Realization Stakes in October.

Racing at age four and five, Thinking Cap continued to show his strength as a distance runner. Again with Paul Bailey aboard, in 1956 he won the mile and one-half Stymie Handicap at Belmont Park and the grueling mile and three-quarters Merchants and Citizens Handicap. In his last year of racing, Thinking Cap won the 1957 Southampton Handicap at Belmont Park. Ridden by Eldon Nelson, the race was contested on a sloppy track over a distance of a mile and one-half.

== At stud ==
Retired to stand at stud for the Lungers, Thinking Cap sired a number of horses that made it into racing from which only his son Smart was able to achieve his sire's level of success. Smart, a 1959 chestnut colt whose dam was Enchanted Eve, inherited Thinking Cap's endurance with wins in such top level races at a mile and one-quarter or more such as the Manhattan, Gallant Fox, and Massachusetts Handicaps, the latter he won back-to-back in 1964 and 1965.
