= Two Lea =

American-bred Thoroughbred racehorse

- Sire: Bull Lea
- Grandsire: Bull Dog
- Dam: Two Bob
- Damsire: The Porter
- Sex: Filly
- Foaled: 1946
- Country: USA
- Colour: Bay
- Breeder: Calumet Farm
- Owner: Calumet Farm
- Trainer: Horace A. Jones
- Record: 26 Starts: 15-6-3
- Earnings: $309,250

Major wins
- Princess Doreen Stakes (1949); Cleopatra Handicap (1949); Artful Stakes (1949); Arcadia Handicap (1949); Santa Margarita Handicap (1950); Vanity Handicap (1952); Hollywood Gold Cup (1952); Ramona Handicap (1952); San Mateo Handicap (1952); Children's Hospital Handicap (1950)

Awards
- American Champion Three-Year-Old Filly (tie) (1949); American Champion Older Female Horse (1950)

Honours
- U.S. Racing Hall of Fame (1982) #77 - Top 100 U.S. Racehorses of the 20th Century
- Last updated on December 2, 2007

Two Lea (1946–1973) was a champion American Thoroughbred racehorse who was the 1949 Champion Three-Year-Old Filly and 1950 Champion Older Female.

== Background ==
Born at Calumet Farm in Lexington, Kentucky, her sire was Bull Lea whose progeny were already successful. Her dam was Two Bob, winner of the 1936 Kentucky Oaks.

As a yearling Two Lea developed ringbone, a difficult condition which delayed her training and the start of her racing career.

== Racing career ==
By the time Two Lea stepped on a track at two years of age, the 1948 season was almost over. In her first three tries, she won only her last, a race at Belmont Park, by four lengths.

At three, Two Lea started seven times, winning six of her races. Her only defeat came in the Modesty Stakes against older females; in that race, she carried ten pounds more than the winner. In the Cleopatra Stakes, Two Lea raced against another stablemate, Wistful, who was considered the East Coast's leading filly. Wistful had won the 1949 Kentucky Oaks, the Pimlico Oaks, and the Coaching Club American Oaks and was on her way to divisional honors. Two Lea beat her easing up. In her last three-year-old race, the Artful, she defeated But Why Not, the female champion of 1947. Here, Two Lea came close to equaling the world record for seven furlongs.

Two Lea shared the 1949 three-year-old female championship with Wistful, another Calumet horse, as the fillies tied in the Daily Racing Form poll.

At four, after two wins, she raced males. Ridden by Eddie Arcaro for the first and last time, she contested the Santa Anita Maturity with Ponder, winner of the previous year's Kentucky Derby. On the lead and with Ponder challenging, Arcaro not only did not urge her, he was easing her up. Two Lea held on to second place. Then came the Santa Anita Handicap which Two Lea did not win, but then neither did Citation nor Ponder. They all gave weight to a horse called Noor. Noor won, Citation placed, Two Lea showed, and Ponder came in fourth. At the end of the year, Two Lea was named the Champion Older Filly for 1950.

For the next year and a half, Two Lea did not race, once again enduring ringbone. The treatment was called a "pinfire," a "cure" which resulted in a large knob on her fetlock.

By the time she came back to the races in 1952, she was six years old. Two Lea started eleven times and won six times, five of those wins coming in stakes races. She beat Wistful again, giving her ten pounds, and then won the Hollywood Gold Cup against males. Her last races were at Bay Meadows Racetrack, where she won the San Mateo Handicap and the Children's Hospital Handicap under top weight. In her career, Two Lea finished unplaced only twice.

== Broodmare ==
Two Lea was also successful as a broodmare. Among others, she gave birth to Tim Tam, a horse who came very close to winning the Triple Crown. Her son On-and-On won the Brooklyn Handicap, the Ohio Derby, the Tropical Park Handicap, and a number of other stakes.

Two Lea was 27 when she died in 1973. She is buried at Calumet Farm.

== See also ==
- List of racehorses
