= Arcadia Stakes =

- Class: Grade II
- Location: Santa Anita Park; Arcadia, California, United States
- Inaugurated: 1988
- Race type: Thoroughbred – Flat racing
- Website: www.santaanita.com

Race information
- Distance: 1 mile (8 furlongs)
- Surface: Turf
- Track: Left-handed
- Qualification: Four-Year-Olds & Up
- Weight: Scale Weight
- Purse: $200,000

The Arcadia Stakes is an American Thoroughbred horse race run in early April at Santa Anita Park in Arcadia, California. Open to horses four years of age and older, it is raced on turf over a distance of one mile. A Grade II race, it currently offers a purse of $200,000.

Inaugurated in 1988 as the El Rincon Handicap, it was renamed the Arcadia Handicap in 2001 after the original Arcadia Handicap had been renamed the Frank E. Kilroe Mile Handicap.

Two Lea won this race in 1949.

From 1998 through 2004, the race was run at a distance of 1 1/8 miles.

== Records ==
Time record:

- 1:33.09 – Bolo (2016)

Most wins:

- 2 – Steinlen (1988, 1990)

Most wins by an owner:

- 3 – Juddmonte Farms (1992, 1996, 2004)

Most wins by a jockey:

- 5 – Gary Stevens (1988, 1992, 1996, 1998, 2015)

Most wins by a trainer:

- 5 – Neil D. Drysdale (1989, 1997, 1998, 2011, 2014)
- 4 – Robert J. Frankel (1992, 1993, 1996, 2004)

== Winners of the Arcadia Stakes ==
Year	Winner	Age	Jockey	Trainer	Owner	Time
2017	Bolo	5	Mike Smith	Carla Gaines	Golden Pegasus Racing/Mack	1:34.51
2016	Bolo	4	Flavien Prat	Carla Gaines	Golden Pegasus Racing/Mack	1:33.09
2015	Avanzara	5	Gary Stevens	Thomas F. Proctor	Lanni/Youngblood	1:34.17
2014	Winning Prize (ARG)	5	Rafael Bejarano	Neil D. Drysdale	Heerensperger & Nelson	1:32.89
2013	Suggestive Boy (ARG)	5	Joseph Talamo	Ron McAnally	Pozo de Luna	1:32.73
2012	Mr. Commons	4	Mike Smith	John Shirreffs	St. George Farm Racing	1:33.41
2011	Liberian Freighter	6	Martin Garcia	Neil Drysdale	B. J. Wright	1:34.41
2010	Compari	4	Garrett Gomez	Martin F. Jones	Harris Farms/Valpredo/Nicoletti	1:34.03
2009	Dixie Chatter	4	Tyler Baze	Richard Mandella	H. Sarkowsky/P. & M. Wygod	1:34.12
2008	Daytona (IRE)	4	Alex Solis	Dan L. Hendricks	D. Bienstock/C. Winner et al.	1:33.13
2007	Icy Atlantic	6	Ramon Domínguez	Todd A. Pletcher	James T. Scatuorchio	1:35.18
2006	Silent Name (JPN)	4	Rafael Bejarano	Gary Mandella	Wertheimer et Frère	1:33.17
2005	Singletary	5	Alex Solis	Don Chatlos Jr.	Little Red Feather Racing	1:33.52
2004	Diplomatic Bag	4	David R. Flores	Robert J. Frankel	Juddmonte Farms	1:47.90
2003	Century City (IRE)	4	Jose Valdivia Jr.	C. Beau Greely	Kitchwa Stable & T. Nichols	1:47.84
2002	Seinne (CHI)	5	Chris McCarron	Ron McAnally	Nelson Bunker Hunt	1:47.16
2001	Lazy Lode (ARG)	7	Laffit Pincay Jr.	Richard Mandella	The Thoroughbred Corp.	1:49.74
2000	Falcon Flight (FR)	4	Brice Blanc	Ben D. A. Cecil	Gary A. Tanaka	1:47.88
1999	Commitisize	4	David R. Flores	Bob Baffert	Mike Pegram	1:48.25
1998	Hawksley Hill (IRE)	5	Gary Stevens	Neil D. Drysdale	D & J Heerensperger	1:49.96
1997	Labeeb (GB)	5	Ed Delahoussaye	Neil D. Drysdale	Gainsborough Farm	1:35.96
1996	Tychonic (GB)	6	Gary Stevens	Robert J. Frankel	Juddmonte Farms	1:35.84
1995	Savinio	5	Chris McCarron	Walter Greenman	Vandeweghe, Biszantz, et al.	1:34.74
1994	Norwich (GB)	7	Pat Valenzuela	Gary F. Jones	Darley Stud	1:34.14
1993	Val Des Bois (FR)	7	Pat Valenzuela	Robert J. Frankel	Edmund A. Gann	1:35.07
1992	Exbourne	6	Gary Stevens	Robert J. Frankel	Juddmonte Farms	1:33.21
1991	Pharisien (FR)	4	Corey Nakatani	Christian Doumen	Lonimar Stables, Inc.	1:33.20
1990	Steinlen (GB)	7	José A. Santos	D. Wayne Lukas	Wildenstein Stable	1:33.40
1989	Political Ambition	5	Ed Delahoussaye	Neil D. Drysdale	Clover Racing Stable et al.	1:35.60
1988	Steinlen (GB)	5	Gary Stevens	D. Wayne Lukas	Wildenstein Stable	1:34.42
