= The Porter (horse) =

American racehorse

- Sire: Sweep
- Grandsire: Ben Brush
- Dam: Ballet Girl
- Damsire: St. Leonards
- Sex: Stallion
- Foaled: May 15, 1915
- Died: October 1944 (aged 29)
- Country: United States
- Color: Bay
- Breeder: David Stevenson
- Owner: Samuel Ross (1917-1918); Edward Beale McLean
- Trainer: John F. Schorr
- Record: 54: 26-20-8
- Earnings: $73,866

Major wins
- Blue and Grey Highweight Handicap (1918); Baltimore Handicap (1918); Harford County Handicap (1919, 1920); Laurel Handicap (1919); Inaugural Handicap (1920); Havre de Grace Handicap (1920); Wilton Handicap (1920); Monumental Handicap (1920); Annapolis Handicap (1921)

Awards
- Leading sire in North America (1937)

The Porter (May 15, 1915 – October 1944) was an American Thoroughbred racehorse. He won 26 times from 54 starts in a career that lasted five years, and was second in the 1918 Preakness Stakes. He became an important sire, leading the North American sire list in 1937.

== Background ==
The Porter was a bay horse bred in Kentucky by David Stevenson. He was sired by Sweep, a champion at ages two and three on the racetrack, and a leading sire and broodmare sire at stud. His dam Ballet Girl was a half-sister to the champion Thoroughbred Ballot.

The Porter was a small horse, standing about 15 hands (60 inches, 152 cm) at the withers, with a long body and short legs. He was known for his soundness and ability to carry high weights.

At the start of his racing career, The Porter was owned by Samuel Ross. He was sold early in 1918 to E. B. McLean, who sent him into training with John Schorr.

== Racing career ==
Racing mainly in Maryland and Kentucky, The Porter started 54 times, accumulating 26 wins, 10 seconds and 8 thirds. He was the fifth-ranked three-year old of 1918 according to The Blood-Horse. That year, he won the Blue and Grey Highweight Handicap and Baltimore Handicap, beating the highly regarded colts Omar Khayyam and Cudgel in the latter in what was called the "surprise of the season". He was also second in the Preakness Stakes.

In 1919, he earned a reputation as one of the best handicap horses in "the West" (as racing in Kentucky was then known). He then traveled to Saratoga where he won the Plattsburgh Handicap. Returning to Maryland, he won The Harford Handicap, in which he defeated future Hall of Famer Exterminator, followed by a win over Triple Crown champion Sir Barton in the feature race on September 24 at Havre de Grace. He won a string of three handicap races at Laurel in October, before finishing second to Sir Barton in the Pimlico Serial.

In 1920, he was the third-ranked older horse (behind Sir Barton and Exterminator) according to the Blood-Horse after he won several major races. On May 24, He set a track record for seven furlongs of 1:25 at Churchill Downs, followed by a win in the Inaugural Handicap at Latonia on June 5. On September 11, he won the $5,000 Harford Handicap at Havre de Grace for the second time, beating Boniface by four lengths. Best known as a miler, The Porter won at a distance of nine furlongs in the $10,000 Havre de Grace Handicap while carrying 129 pounds compared to 108 pounds on the runner-up. He stretched out even further to win the Monumental Handicap at Pimlico over 1 3/16 in track record time while carrying 130 pounds.

The highlight of his six-year-old campaign in 1921 was winning the Annapolis Handicap over Exterminator. Stretching out to 1 1/2 miles, well beyond his usual distance, he rated behind Exterminator then made his move with half a mile remaining. Exterminator, carrying top weight of 135 pounds, could not respond and finished third. The Porter drew off to win by over two lengths.

During his career, he equaled or broke several track records at distances from 7 to 9 1/2 furlongs.

== Stud career ==
The Porter initially stood at McLean's stud near Leesburg, Virginia. When McLean's stock was dispersed in 1931, The Porter was purchased for $27,000 by John Hay Whitney and was moved to Mare's Nest Stud near Lexington, Kentucky. He was pensioned after the 1943 season and died in October 1944.

The Porter was the leading sire in North America of 1937. His most important offspring include Aneroid, Porter's Cap, Porter's Mite, Rosemont and Toro. His daughter Two Bob was both a stakes winner and a multiple stakes producer. Two Bob's family remains active and has produced classic winners in the United States, Great Britain, Germany and Japan.

== Sire line tree ==
- The Porter
  - Time Maker
    - Time Supply
  - Toro
  - Rosemont
    - Isasmoothie
    - Thinking Cap
      - Smart
  - Aneroid
  - Porters Mite
  - Porters Cap

== Pedigree ==
Pedigree of The Porter, 1915
Sire Sweep	Ben Brush	Bramble	Bonnie Scotland
Sire Sweep	Ben Brush	Bramble	Ivy Leaf
Sire Sweep	Ben Brush	Roseville	Reform
Sire Sweep	Ben Brush	Roseville	Albia
Sire Sweep	Pink Domino	Domino	Himyar
Sire Sweep	Pink Domino	Domino	Mannie Gray
Sire Sweep	Pink Domino	Belle Rose	Beaudesert
Sire Sweep	Pink Domino	Belle Rose	Monte Rosa
Dam Ballet Girl	St Leonards	St Blaise	Hermit (GB)
Dam Ballet Girl	St Leonards	St Blaise	Fusee (GB)
Dam Ballet Girl	St Leonards	Belladonna	King Fisher
Dam Ballet Girl	St Leonards	Belladonna	Bellona
Dam Ballet Girl	Cerito	Lowland Chief (GB)	Lowlander (GB)
Dam Ballet Girl	Cerito	Lowland Chief (GB)	Bathilde (GB)
Dam Ballet Girl	Cerito	Merry Dance (GB)	Doncaster (GB)
Dam Ballet Girl	Cerito	Merry Dance (GB)	Highland Fling (family 14)
