= Tropical Park Handicap =

- Class: Ungraded stakes
- Location: Tropical Park Race Track; Miami, Florida
- Inaugurated: 1938
- Race type: Thoroughbred - Flat racing

Race information
- Distance: 1 1/8 miles (9 furlongs)
- Surface: Dirt
- Track: Left-handed
- Qualification: Three-years-old & up

The Tropical Park Handicap was an American Thoroughbred horse race run annually at Tropical Park Race Track in Florida run from 1938 until the track closed in 1972. Open to horses age three and older, it was contested on dirt over a distance of a one and one-eighth miles.

Won by notable horses such as the 1947 Preakness Stakes winner Faultless, at one time the Tropical Park Handicap was an important race. The article title for a story on the event in the November 24, 1965 issue of the Miami News said that the "Tropical Handicap Now Attracts Nation's Finest."
