= Sweep (horse) =

American-bred Thoroughbred racehorse

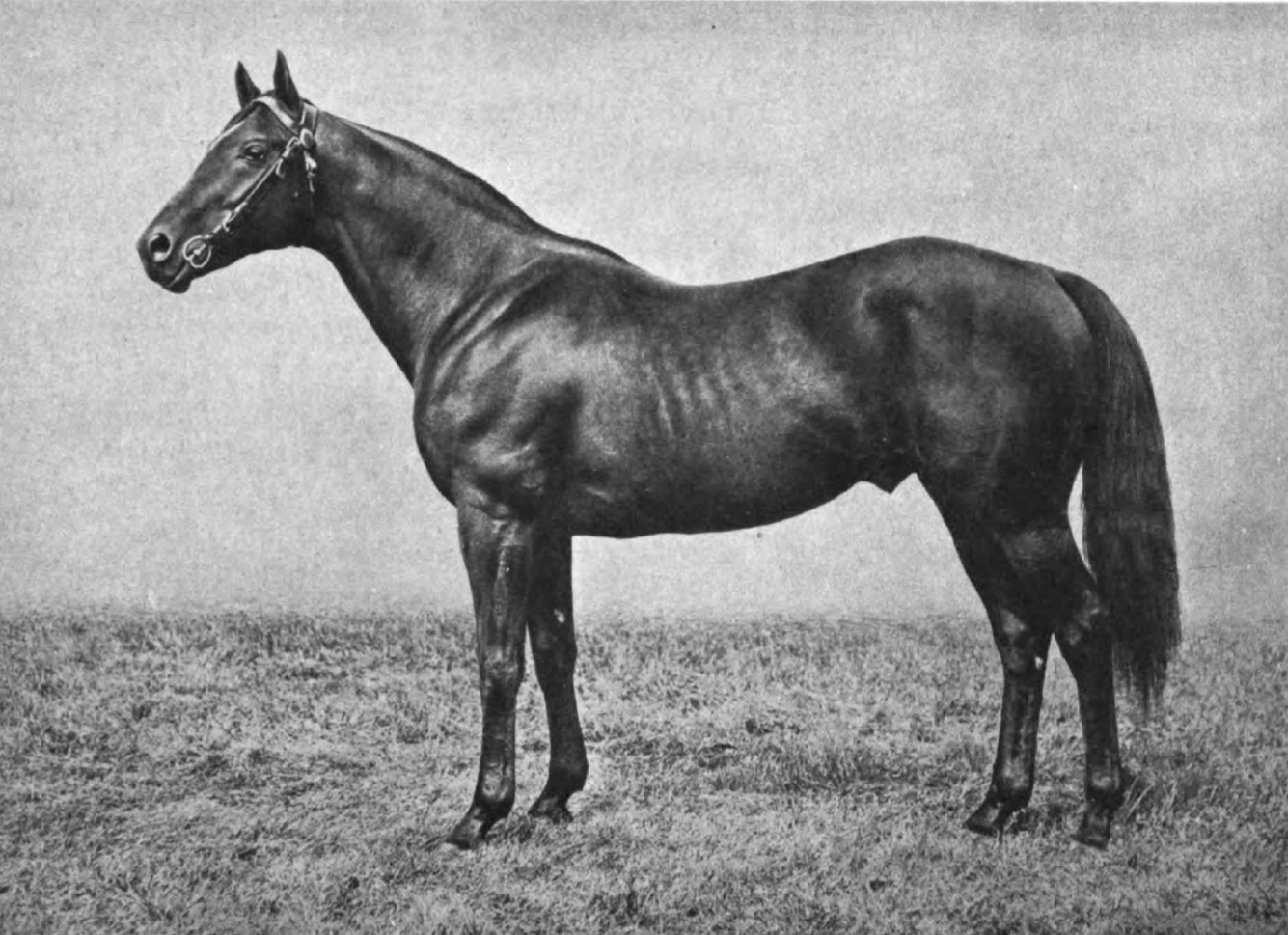
- Sire: Ben Brush
- Grandsire: Bramble
- Dam: Pink Domino
- Damsire: Domino
- Sex: Stallion
- Foaled: 1907
- Country: United States
- Color: Brown
- Breeder: James R. Keene
- Owner: James R. Keene; John S. Barbee (Glen Helen Stud)
- Trainer: James G. Rowe Sr.
- Record: 13: 9–2–2
- Earnings: $63,948

Major wins
- National Stallion Stakes (1909); Futurity Stakes (1909); Lawrence Realization Stakes (1910); Carlton Stakes (1910) Triple Crown race wins: Belmont Stakes (1910)

Awards
- U.S. Champion 2-Y-O Colt (1909); U.S. Champion 3-Y-O Colt (1910)
- Last updated on August 11, 2021

Sweep (foaled 1907 in Kentucky) was an American Thoroughbred racehorse.

== Background ==
Sweep was bred by James R. Keene. He was sired by Kentucky Derby winner Ben Brush out of the Domino mare Pink Domino. he was trained by James Rowe. Sweep was a Champion two-year-old with a long stride. He placed second in the Hopeful Stakes and the Saratoga Special Stakes before he won the Futurity Stakes by over half a dozen lengths under a tight hold.

== Career ==
Racing at three, with jockey James Butwell aboard, Sweep won the 1910 Belmont Stakes in a time of 2:22 when the race was contested at 1 3/8 miles. He was the favorite at 1 to 10 odds and won by six lengths over the only other starter, Duke of Ormonde. It was one of only five times in the history of the stakes race that just two horses have been entered.

== Retirement ==
Retired to Keene's Castleton Farm, in 1917 Sweep was the leading sire of two-year-olds. He was the leading sire by earnings of all horses in 1918 and again in 1925. He was a great sire and broodmare sire, with three daughters that produced Kentucky Derby winners. They were Beaming Beauty, dam of Bubbling Over; Brushup, dam of War Admiral; and Dust Whirl, dam of Whirlaway. Both War Admiral and Whirlaway became Triple Crown champions.

His daughter Washoe Belle became the foundation mare to whom trace Forward Pass, Alydar, Princess Turia, T.V. Lark., etc.

Another daughter, La Chica, became the foundation mare to whom trace Grey Flight and Native Dancer, which bring the Northern Dancer and Mr. Prospector lines.

Other successful progeny include Eternal, General Thatcher, The Porter, Leonardo, Bon Homme, and Pen Rose.

Sweep died in 1936.

== Sire line tree ==
- Sweep
  - The Porter
    - Time Maker
      - Time Supply
    - Toro
    - Rosemont
      - Isasmoothie
      - Thinking Cap
        - Smart
    - Aneroid
    - Porters Mite
    - Porters Cap
  - Eternal
    - Nocturnal
    - Ariel
      - Airflame
      - Chicuelo
      - High Breeze
      - Ariel Lad
      - Swiv
      - Education
        - Bold Scholar
    - Infinity
    - Trinchera
    - Okapi
    - Xalapa Crown
    - Aletern
  - Bon Homme
  - Leonardo
  - General Thatcher
  - Mantagna

== Pedigree ==
Pedigree of Sweep, brown stallion, 1907
Sire Ben Brush	Bramble	Bonnie Scotland	Iago
Sire Ben Brush	Bramble	Bonnie Scotland	Queen Mary
Sire Ben Brush	Bramble	Ivy Leaf	Australian
Sire Ben Brush	Bramble	Ivy Leaf	Bay Flower
Sire Ben Brush	Roseville	Reform	Leamington*
Sire Ben Brush	Roseville	Reform	Stolen Kisses
Sire Ben Brush	Roseville	Albia	Alarm*
Sire Ben Brush	Roseville	Albia	Elastic
Dam Pink Domino	Domino	Himyar	Alarm*
Dam Pink Domino	Domino	Himyar	Hira
Dam Pink Domino	Domino	Mannie Gray	Enquirer*
Dam Pink Domino	Domino	Mannie Gray	Lizzie G
Dam Pink Domino	Belle Rose	Beaudesert	Sterling
Dam Pink Domino	Belle Rose	Beaudesert	Sea Gull
Dam Pink Domino	Belle Rose	Monte Rosa	Craig Millar
Dam Pink Domino	Belle Rose	Monte Rosa	Hedge Rose (family: 8-c)

* Sweep is inbred 4S x 4D to the stallion Alarm, meaning that he appears fourth generation on the sire side of his pedigree, and fourth generation on the dam side of his pedigree.

* Sweep is inbred 4S x 5D to the stallion Leamington, meaning that he appears fourth generation on the sire side of his pedigree, and fifth generation (via Enquirer) on the dam side of his pedigree.
