= Ismael Valenzuela =

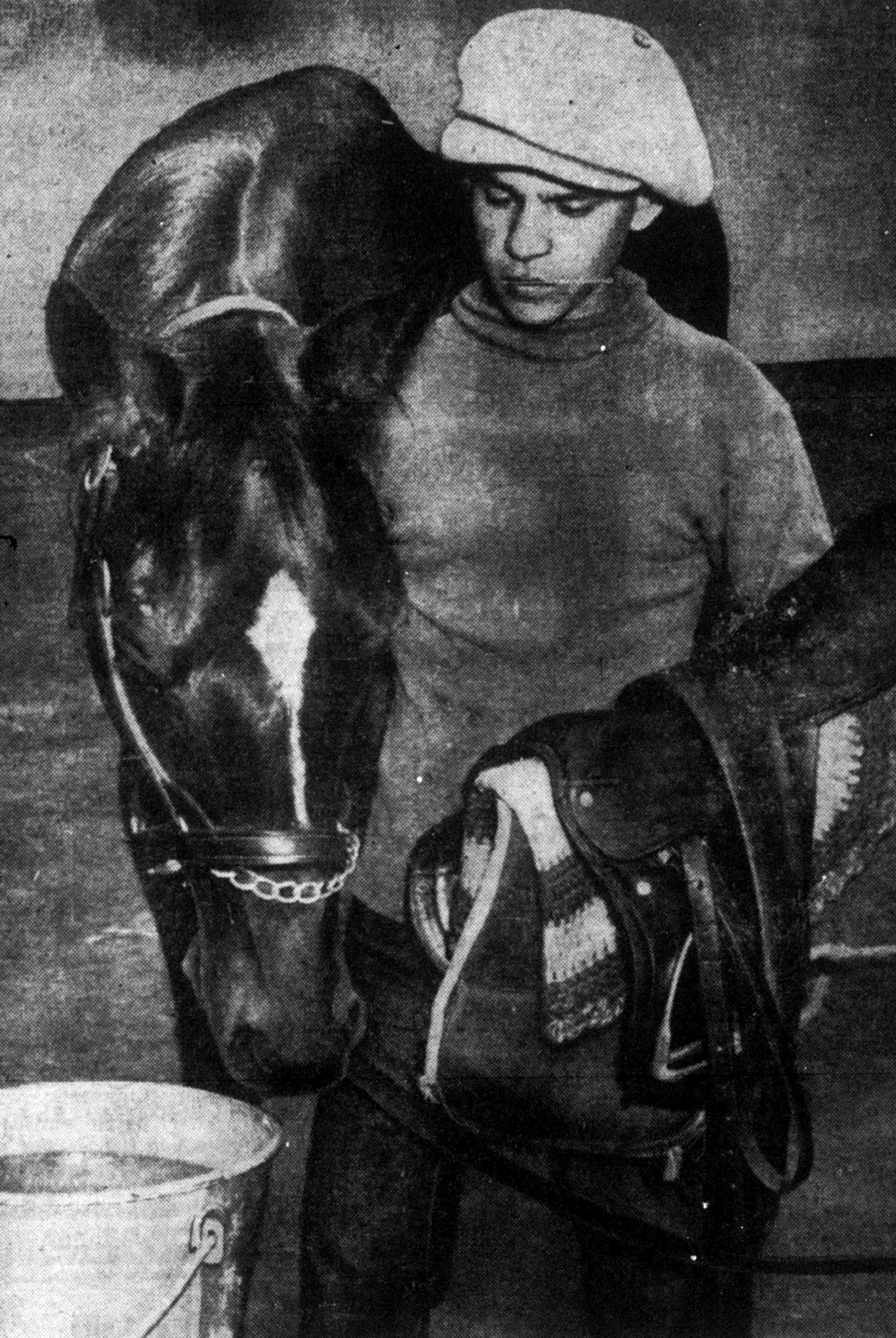
- Valenzuela, circa 1954

Personal information
- Born: December 25, 1934 McNary, Texas, U.S.
- Died: September 2, 2009 (aged 74) Arcadia, California, U.S.
- Occupation: Jockey

Horse racing career
- Sport: Horse racing
- Career wins: 2,545

Major racing wins
- Woodward Stakes (1956, 1962, 1963); Roamer Handicap (1957); San Antonio Handicap (1957); San Vicente Stakes (1957, 1960); Coaching Club American Oaks (1958); Cowdin Stakes (1959); Champagne Stakes; Brooklyn Handicap (1960); Great American Stakes (1961); National Stallion Stakes (1961); National Stallion Stakes (filly division) (1961); Toboggan Handicap (1962); San Gabriel Handicap (1962, 1963); Jockey Club Gold Cup (1962, 1963, 1964); San Juan Capistrano Handicap (1958, 1963); Gardenia Stakes (1963); Whitney Handicap (1963, 1965); Washington, D.C. International (1964); Stymie Handicap (1965); Canadian International Stakes (1966); Blue Grass Stakes (1968); American Derby (1968); Santa Anita Derby (1974) American Classic Race wins: Kentucky Derby (1958, 1968); Preakness Stakes (1958, 1968)

Racing awards
- George Woolf Memorial Jockey Award (1963)

Honors
- United States Racing Hall of Fame (2008)

Significant horses
- Affectionately, Cicada, Castle Forbes, Forward Pass, George Royal, Kelso, Native Diver, Porterhouse, Round Table, Sir Gaylord, Searching, Tim Tam
- Updated on May 27, 2010

Ismael Valenzuela (December 25, 1934 – September 2, 2009) was an American Thoroughbred horse racing jockey. He was one of 22 children born to parents who had immigrated to the United States. Shortly after Valenzuela's birth, the family returned to their native Mexico. At age 14, Valenzuela came back to the United States where he began working with quarter horses, then launched his career as a jockey at a racetrack in Tucson, Arizona. He eventually began riding in California and came to national prominence as a jockey competing for the American Triple Crown of Thoroughbred Racing.

Leading up to the 1958 Kentucky Derby, the California horse Silky Sullivan received much publicity for his habit of coming from very far behind to win races. It was the first time television played a major role in the publicizing of a racehorse, and after Valenzuela won the Derby on board Tim Tam, the next day he was flown to New York City to make a guest appearance on CBS Television's The Ed Sullivan Show. Two weeks later, Valenzuela and Tim Tam won the Preakness Stakes, but in the final leg of the Triple Crown, they finished second at the Belmont Stakes after the horse fractured a sesamoid bone near the end of the race.

For over three years in the early 1960s, Valenzuela was the regular rider of Kelso. On Kelso, Valenzuela won twenty-two important graded stakes races, passed Round Table to become the No. 1 money winner in Thoroughbred racing history, and earned the most prestigious Horse of the Year award every year. In 1963, Valenzuela was the recipient of the George Woolf Memorial Jockey Award given to a top thoroughbred jockey in North America who demonstrates high standards of personal and professional conduct, on and off the racetrack. In 1966, he won the Canadian International Stakes and in 1968 history repeated itself when he again won the Kentucky Derby and Preakness Stakes with Forward Pass but fell short of winning the Triple Crown when they finished second in the Belmont Stakes.

After having won 2,545 races, Valenzuela retired from racing to a home near Santa Anita Park. In December 1998, his wife died suddenly of liver failure at age 63. Rosa Delia Valenzuela had been taking the doctor-prescribed drug Rezulin that a few months later was withdrawn from the market when the U.S. Food and Drug Administration concluded that Rezulin use had "possibly or probably" resulted in 90 liver failures, including 63 deaths and seven nonfatal organ transplants.

In 2008, Valenzuela was elected to the National Museum of Racing and Hall of Fame. In poor health, he was unable to travel to the annual induction ceremony on August 4 at Saratoga Springs, New York and was inducted in a special ceremony at Santa Anita Racetrack on June 22, 2008.

Seventy-four-year-old Ismael Valenzuela died on September 2, 2009, and was buried in the Live Oak Memorial Park Cemetery in Monrovia, California.

Valenzuela had three brothers who also became jockeys as did his nephew, Pat Valenzuela.
