= Amberoid =

American-bred Thoroughbred racehorse

- Sire: Count Amber
- Grandsire: Ambiorix
- Dam: Spencerian
- Damsire: Destino
- Sex: Stallion
- Foaled: 1963
- Country: United States
- Colour: Dark Bay/Brown
- Breeder: Horace N. Davis, Jr.
- Owner: Reginald N. Webster
- Racing colors: Cerise, Turquoise Sash, Blocked Sleeves, Cerise Cap
- Trainer: Lucien Laurin
- Record: 33: 7-10-5
- Earnings: $491,716

Major wins
- Wood Memorial Stakes (1966); Queens County Handicap (1966); Camden Handicap (1967) Triple Crown race wins: Belmont Stakes (1966)

Amberoid (foaled 1963 in Kentucky) was an American Thoroughbred racehorse best known for winning the 1966 American Classic, the Belmont Stakes.

Amberoid was conditioned for racing by future Hall of Fame trainer Lucien Laurin and ridden primarily by another future Hall of Fame inductee, Bill Boland. Going into the 1966 U.S. Triple Crown series, Amberoid won the Wood Memorial Stakes. He then finished seventh in the Kentucky Derby and third in the Preakness Stakes before winning the final leg of the Triple Crown, the Belmont Stakes.

When his racing career was over, Amberoid stood at stud in the United States from 1969 to 1973, after which he stood in Japan until he died on June 30, 1985.
