= Tim Tam (horse) =

American thoroughbred racehorse

- Sire: Tom Fool
- Grandsire: Menow
- Dam: Two Lea
- Damsire: Bull Lea
- Sex: Stallion
- Foaled: 1955
- Country: U.S.
- Colour: Dark Bay
- Breeder: Calumet Farm
- Owner: Calumet Farm
- Trainer: Horace A. Jones
- Rider: Ismael Valenzuela
- Record: 14:10-1-2
- Earnings: $467,475

Major wins
- Fountain of Youth Stakes (1958); Florida Derby (1958); Forerunner Stakes (1958); Derby Trial (1958); Everglades Stakes (1958) American Triple Crown wins: Kentucky Derby (1958); Preakness Stakes (1958)

Awards
- U.S. Champion 3-Year-Old Colt (1958)

Honors
- United States Racing Hall of Fame (1985)
- Last updated on January 28, 2020

Tim Tam (April 19, 1955 – July 30, 1982) was a champion American Thoroughbred racehorse who won the 1958 Kentucky Derby and Preakness Stakes, but fell short of winning the Triple Crown of American thoroughbred horse racing, coming in second place in the Belmont Stakes. He was inducted into the Hall of Fame.

== Background ==
Tim Tam was a dark bay horse sired by Tom Fool and out of Two Lea (both sire and dam listed on the Top 100 U.S. Racehorses of the 20th Century; Tom Fool at #11 and Two Lea at #77), the dark bay colt was owned and bred by Calumet Farm. Tim Tam was trained by Jimmy Jones.

== Racing career ==
Racing at age two, Tim Tam finished unplaced in his only start of 1957, earning just $275.00.

As a three-year-old, Tim Tam won the Everglades Stakes, the Flamingo Stakes, the Fountain of Youth Stakes, the Florida Derby, the Forerunner Stakes and the Derby Trial en route to winning the 1958 Kentucky Derby.

After winning the Preakness Stakes, Tim Tam was considered to have a strong chance to capture the American Triple Crown. However, in the Belmont Stakes, coming down the home stretch toward the lead that seemed to assure victory, Tim Tam fractured a sesamoid bone and hobbled the last yards across the finish line in second place. His injury ended his career but he went on to be a successful sire.

== Stud record ==
At stud Tim Tam sired 14 stakes race winners, among them the Hall of Fame filly Tosmah. His legacy would become even more important as the damsire of three outstanding runners:

Mac Diarmida (1975) : The American Champion Male Turf Horse of 1978 whose wins included the prestigious Canadian International Championship and Washington, D.C. International Stakes;

Davona Dale (1976) : In 1979 she won the American Triple Tiara of Thoroughbred Racing and was voted American Champion Three-Year-Old Filly. In 1985 she was inducted into the U. S. Racing Hall of Fame;

Before Dawn (1979) : The 1981 American Champion Two-Year-Old Filly.

In 1980 Tim Tam was retired from stud duty. On Monday, July 25, 1982, he suffered a heart attack and on Friday July 30 was euthanized. He was buried in the Calumet Farm equine cemetery.

== Honors ==
Although his racing season was cut short, Tim Tam still was elected American Champion Three-Year-Old Male Horse for 1958.

In 1985, Tim Tam was inducted into the National Museum of Racing and Hall of Fame.

The Tim Tam chocolate biscuit manufactured by Arnott's in Australia was named after the horse.

== Breeding ==
Pedigree of Tim Tam
Sire Tom Fool bay 1949	Menow brown 1935	Pharamond	Phalaris
Sire Tom Fool bay 1949	Menow brown 1935	Pharamond	Selene
Sire Tom Fool bay 1949	Menow brown 1935	Alcibiades	Supremus
Sire Tom Fool bay 1949	Menow brown 1935	Alcibiades	Regal Roman
Sire Tom Fool bay 1949	Gaga bay 1942	Bull Dog	Teddy
Sire Tom Fool bay 1949	Gaga bay 1942	Bull Dog	Plucky Liege
Sire Tom Fool bay 1949	Gaga bay 1942	Alpoise	Equipoise
Sire Tom Fool bay 1949	Gaga bay 1942	Alpoise	Laughing Queen
Dam Two Lea bay 1946	Bull Lea brown 1935	Bull Dog	Teddy
Dam Two Lea bay 1946	Bull Lea brown 1935	Bull Dog	Plucky Liege
Dam Two Lea bay 1946	Bull Lea brown 1935	Rose Leaves	Ballot
Dam Two Lea bay 1946	Bull Lea brown 1935	Rose Leaves	Colonial
Dam Two Lea bay 1946	Two Bob ch. 1933	The Porter	Sweep
Dam Two Lea bay 1946	Two Bob ch. 1933	The Porter	Ballet Girl
Dam Two Lea bay 1946	Two Bob ch. 1933	Blessings	Chicle
Dam Two Lea bay 1946	Two Bob ch. 1933	Blessings	Mission Bells (family: 23-b)

- Tim Tam was inbred 3 × 3 to Bull Dog, meaning that this stallion appears twice in the third generation of his pedigree.
