= Henry Forrest (racehorse trainer) =

Personal information
- Born: July 7, 1907 Covington, Kentucky, United States
- Died: April 5, 1975 (aged 67)
- Resting place: Mount Hope Cemetery (Franklin, Tennessee)
- Occupation: Trainer

Horse racing career
- Sport: Horse racing
- Career wins: 2,000+

Major racing wins
- Washington Park Handicap (1938); Oaklawn Handicap (1953); Rebel Stakes (1962); Bewitch Stakes (1965); Governor's Gold Cup (1966); Prince George's Stakes (1966); Fountain of Youth Stakes (1966); Blue Grass Stakes (1968); Florida Derby (1968); American Derby (1968); Royal Palm Handicap (1969); Saranac Stakes (1969); Gravesend Handicap (1969) American Classics wins: Kentucky Derby (1966, 1968); Preakness Stakes (1966, 1968)

Racing awards
- Leading trainer at Keeneland Spring Meet (1953, 1960, 1967); Leading trainer at Keeneland Fall Meet (1948, 1954, 1963, 1966)

Honours
- Fair Grounds Racing Hall of Fame (1999); United States' Racing Hall of Fame (2007)

Significant horses
- Forward Pass, Kauai King
- Updated on April 25, 2007

Henry Forrest (July 7, 1907 - April 5, 1975) was an American Hall of Fame trainer of Thoroughbred racehorses who twice won the Kentucky Derby and Preakness Stakes.

Henry Forrest was born in Covington, Kentucky, and began his career near Lexington breaking yearlings for Col. E. R. Bradley's Idle Hour Stock Farm. He embarked on a professional training career in 1937 that would mainly involve operating public stables but also for renowned Kentucky owners, Claiborne and Calumet Farm. In 1966, Forrest won the first two legs of the U.S. Triple Crown races with Kauai King. He repeated the feat two years later in 1968 with Forward Pass who would receive American Champion Three-Year-Old Male Horse honors.

During a career in which he won more than 2,000 races, eight times Henry Forrest finished among the top ten American trainers in races won and on two occasions was in the top ten in purse money earned. He was the owner of Forrest Farms Inc. in Brentwood, Tennessee.

Henry Forrest died in a Lexington, Kentucky, hospital in 1975 at the age of 67. He is buried in Franklin, Tennessee. In 1999 he was posthumously inducted in the Fair Grounds Racing Hall of Fame and in 2007, to the National Museum of Racing and Hall of Fame.
