= Grand Slam of Thoroughbred racing =

Set of four American horse races

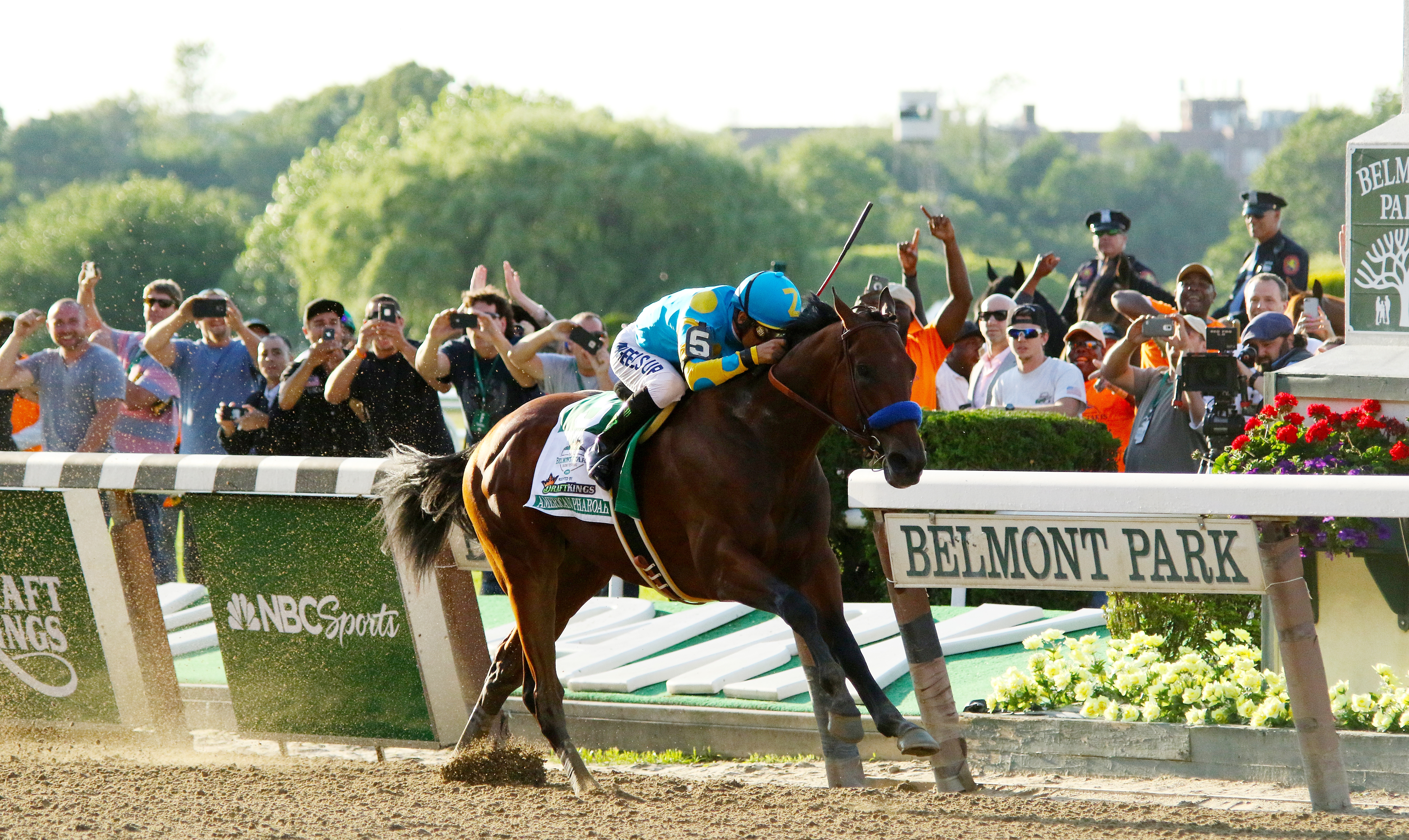
American Pharoah has been the only winner of a Breeder's Cup Classic Grand Slam

The Grand Slam of Thoroughbred racing is an informal name for winning four major Thoroughbred horse races in one season in the United States. The term has been applied to two configurations of races, both of which include the races of the Triple Crown—the Kentucky Derby, Preakness Stakes and Belmont Stakes—and either the Travers Stakes or the Breeders' Cup Classic as the final race.

The Travers Stakes Grand Slam is the older version, having been possible since 1875. These four races are sometimes also called the Superfecta or Quadruple Crown. The Breeders' Cup Classic Grand Slam has been possible since 1984.

Both configurations have been successful once. Whirlaway won the Triple Crown and Travers Stakes in 1941, and American Pharoah won the Triple Crown and Breeder's Cup Classic in 2015.

The Grand Slam moniker is typically only available to three-year-old horses, as the Triple Crown and Travers Stakes are limited to that age. The Breeders' Cup Classic, however, has no age limits, so a Triple Crown winner could win the Classic in subsequent years, although that feat has yet to be attempted. It is unlikely to happen because Triple Crown winners are typically in high demand for stud service.

Quintuple Crown is the suggested name for winning all five races in the same season, a feat yet to be accomplished.

== Grand Slam races ==
Grand Slam races
| Race | Date | Current Track | Location | Distance | Background | Trophy |
|---|---|---|---|---|---|---|
| Kentucky Derby "The Run for the Roses" | First Saturday in May | Churchill Downs | Louisville, Kentucky | 1 1/4 miles (2,000 m) | Inaugurated in 1875, the race was originally 1 1/2 miles (2,400 m) until 1896 when it was shortened to its current distance. It is the only one of the four races to have been continuously run from its inception. Colts and geldings carry 126 pounds (57 kg) and fillies 121 pounds (55 kg). The field has been limited to 20 horses since 1975. | The Kentucky Derby Trophy |
| Preakness Stakes "The Run for the Black-Eyed Susans" | Third Saturday in May | Pimlico Race Course | Baltimore, Maryland | 1 3/16 miles (1,900 m) | Inaugurated in 1873 and continuously run since 1894, it is the shortest of the four races. Pimlico was the home of the race from 1873 to 1889 and again from 1908 until the present. The Preakness was not run from 1891 to 1893. Weights are the same as for the Derby. Field is limited to 14 horses. | The Woodlawn Vase |
| Belmont Stakes "The Test of the Champion" | Third Saturday following the Preakness (first or second Saturday in June) | Belmont Park | Elmont, New York | 1 1/2 miles (2,400 m) | Inaugurated in 1867, though not held in 1911 and 1912 due to anti-gambling legislation in New York. Race was held at various New York tracks until 1905 when Belmont Park became the permanent location. Distance varied from 1 5/8 to 1 1/8 miles until set at 1 1/2 miles in 1926. Weight assignments are the same as the other two races. Field is limited to 16 horses. | The August Belmont Trophy |
| Travers Stakes "Mid-summer Derby" | Last Saturday in August | Saratoga Race Course | Saratoga Springs, New York | 1 1/4 miles (2,000 m) | Inaugurated in 1864, though not held in 1896, 1898, 1899, or 1900 due to financial difficulties, and 1911 and 1912 due to anti-gambling legislation in New York. Distance varied from 1 1/8 to 1 3/4 miles until set at 1 1/4 miles in 1904. | The Man o' War Cup |
| Breeders' Cup Classic | Last Saturday in October or the first Saturday in November | Different location each year | | 1 1/4 miles (2,000 m) | Inaugurated in 1984, it is the same length as the Kentucky Derby. The race is held at various different tracks, Santa Anita Park in Arcadia, California has hosted the most with nine. The Breeders' Cup Classic differs from the other races in the Grand Slam, as it allows 3 year olds and up to participate. The field is limited to 14 horses. | The Breeders' Cup Trophy |

== Grand Slam winners ==
| Year | Winner | Races | Jockey | Trainer | Owner | Breeder | Colors |
|---|---|---|---|---|---|---|---|
| 1941 | Whirlaway | Kentucky Derby; Preakness Stakes; Belmont Stakes; Travers Stakes | Eddie Arcaro | Ben A. Jones | Calumet Farm | Calumet Farm | |
| 2015 | American Pharoah | Kentucky Derby; Preakness Stakes; Belmont Stakes; Breeders' Cup Classic | Victor Espinoza | Bob Baffert | Ahmed Zayat | Ahmed Zayat | American Pharoah |

== Travers Stakes Grand Slam ==
Whirlaway won the Travers Stakes Grand Slam in 1941, and is the only horse to accomplish the feat.

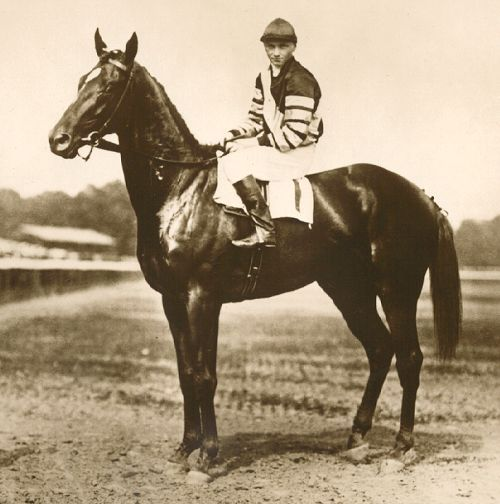
Man O'War won the Preakness, Belmont, and Travers but did not race in the 1920 Kentucky Derby.

The Travers Stakes Grand Slam consists of the four oldest races for three-year-olds in the United States. The Travers was first run in 1864, followed by the Belmont in 1867, Preakness in 1873, and Derby in 1875. According to international classifications, the Travers is the third-ranked race for American three-year-olds, behind only the Kentucky Derby and Belmont Stakes. Racing historian Edward Hotaling first designated these four races as the Grand Slam.

Four horses that won the Triple Crown have attempted to complete the Grand Slam. Whirlaway accomplished the feat in 1941, while Gallant Fox (1930) and American Pharoah (2015, but that came after the modern Grand Slam had been developed) came up short in their attempts. Affirmed (1978) had again defeated Alydar to seemingly win the last pre-Breeders Cup era Grand Slam, but was disqualified for interference. Due to the lack of success in winning the fourth race, the Travers Stakes has been nicknamed the "Graveyard of Champions."

Ten horses have won two legs of the Triple Crown and the Travers Stakes. Fifteen horses have entered all four races and won two or more. Three horses, Duke of Magenta, Grenada, and Man o' War did not enter the Kentucky Derby but won the three other races.

Nine Triple Crown winners did not enter the Travers Stakes. Secretariat withdrew before the race due to illness. However, Ron Turcotte did complete a Grand Slam by riding Annihilate 'Em in the 1973 Travers Stakes.

=== Multiple race winners ===
| Year | Kentucky Derby | Preakness Stakes | Belmont Stakes | Travers Stakes |
|---|---|---|---|---|
| 1867 | no race held | no race held | Ruthless* | Ruthless* |
| 1870 | no race held | no race held | Kingfisher* | Kingfisher* |
| 1871 | no race held | no race held | Harry Bassett* | Harry Bassett* |
| 1872 | no race held | no race held | Joe Daniels* | Joe Daniels* |
| 1877 | Baden-Baden* | Cloverbrook* | Cloverbrook* | Baden-Baden* |
| 1878 | Day Star | Duke of Magenta* | Duke of Magenta* | Duke of Magenta* |
| 1880 | Fonso | Grenada* | Grenada* | Grenada* |
| 1881 | Hindoo* | Saunterer* | Saunterer* | Hindoo* |
| 1888 | Macbeth II | Refund | Sir Dixon* | Sir Dixon* |
| 1892 | Azra* | no race held | Patron | Azra* |
| 1894 | Chant | Assignee | Henry of Navarre* | Henry of Navarre* |
| 1895 | Halma | Belmar* | Belmar* | Liza |
| 1917 | Omar Khayyam* | Kalitan | Hourless | Omar Khayyam* |
| 1919 | Sir Barton* | Sir Barton* | Sir Barton* | Hannibal |
| 1920 | Paul Jones | Man o' War* | Man o' War* | Man o' War* |
| 1922 | Morvich | Pillory* | Pillory* | Little Chief |
| 1923 | Zev* | Vigil II | Zev* | Wilderness |
| 1930 | Gallant Fox* | Gallant Fox* | Gallant Fox* | Jim Dandy |
| 1931 | Twenty Grand* | Mate | Twenty Grand* | Twenty Grand* |
| 1932 | Burgoo King* | Burgoo King* | Faireno | War Hero |
| 1935 | Omaha* | Omaha* | Omaha* | Gold Foam |
| 1936 | Bold Venture* | Bold Venture* | Granville* | Granville* |
| 1937 | War Admiral* | War Admiral* | War Admiral* | Burning Star |
| 1939 | Johnstown* | Challedon | Johnstown* | Eight Thirty |
| 1940 | Gallahadion | Bimelech* | Bimelech* | Fenelon |
| 1941 | Whirlaway† | Whirlaway† | Whirlaway† | Whirlaway† |
| 1942 | Shut Out* | Alsab | Shut Out* | Shut Out* |
| 1943 | Count Fleet* | Count Fleet* | Count Fleet* | Eurasian |
| 1944 | Pensive* | Pensive* | Bounding Home | By Jimmini |
| 1946 | Assault* | Assault* | Assault* | Natchez |
| 1948 | Citation* | Citation* | Citation* | Ace Admiral |
| 1949 | Ponder | Capot* | Capot* | Arise |
| 1950 | Middleground* | Hill Prince | Middleground* | Lights Up |
| 1952 | Hill Gail | Blue Man | One Count* | One Count* |
| 1953 | Dark Star | Native Dancer* | Native Dancer* | Native Dancer* |
| 1955 | Swaps | Nashua* | Nashua* | Thinking Cap |
| 1956 | Needles* | Fabius | Needles* | Oh Johnny |
| 1957 | Iron Liege | Bold Ruler | Gallant Man* | Gallant Man* |
| 1958 | Tim Tam* | Tim Tam* | Cavan | Piano Jim |
| 1959 | Tommy Lee | Royal Orbit | Sword Dancer* | Sword Dancer* |
| 1961 | Carry Back* | Carry Back | Sherluck | Beau Prince |
| 1962 | Decidedly | Greek Money | Jaipur* | Jaipur* |
| 1963 | Chateaugay* | Candy Sports | Chateaugay* | Crewman |
| 1964 | Northern Dancer* | Northern Dancer* | Quadrangle* | Quadrangle* |
| 1965 | Lucky Debonair | Tom Rolfe | Hail To All* | Hail To All* |
| 1966 | Kauai King* | Kauai King* | Amberoid | Buckpasser |
| 1967 | Proud Clarion | Damascus* | Damascus* | Damascus* |
| 1968 | Forward Pass* | Forward Pass* | Stage Door Johnny | Chompion |
| 1969 | Majestic Prince* | Majestic Prince* | Arts and Letters* | Arts and Letters* |
| 1971 | Canonero II* | Canonero II* | Pass Catcher | Bold Reason |
| 1972 | Riva Ridge* | Bee Bee Bee | Riva Ridge* | Key To The Mint |
| 1973 | Secretariat* (Note: Secretariat missed the Travers due to illness.) | Secretariat* | Secretariat* | Annihilate 'Em |
| 1974 | Cannonade | Little Current* | Little Current* | Holding Pattern |
| 1976 | Bold Forbes* | Elocutionist | Bold Forbes* | Honest Pleasure |
| 1977 | Seattle Slew* | Seattle Slew* | Seattle Slew* | Jatski |
| 1978 | Affirmed* | Affirmed* | Affirmed* | Alydar |
| 1979 | Spectacular Bid* | Spectacular Bid* | Coastal | General Assembly |
| 1980 | Genuine Risk | Codex | Temperence Hill* | Temperence Hill* |
| 1981 | Pleasant Colony* | Pleasant Colony* | Summing | Willow Hour |
| 1984 | Swale* | Gate Dancer | Swale* | Carr de Naskra |
| 1987 | Alysheba* | Alysheba* | Bet Twice | Java Gold |
| 1988 | Winning Colors | Risen Star* | Risen Star* | Forty Niner |
| 1989 | Sunday Silence* | Sunday Silence* | Easy Goer* (Note: Easy Goer finished second to Sunday Silence in the Derby, Preakness, and Breeders' Cup Classic. Sunday Silence did not compete in the Travers.) | Easy Goer* |
| 1991 | Strike the Gold | Hansel* | Hansel* | Corporate Report |
| 1993 | Sea Hero* | Prairie Bayou | Colonial Affair | Sea Hero* |
| 1994 | Go for Gin | Tabasco Cat* | Tabasco Cat* | Holly Bull |
| 1995 | Thunder Gulch* | Timber Country | Thunder Gulch* | Thunder Gulch* |
| 1997 | Silver Charm* | Silver Charm* | Touch Gold | Deputy Commander |
| 1998 | Real Quiet* | Real Quiet* | Victory Gallop | Coronado's Quest |
| 1999 | Charismatic* | Charismatic* | Lemon Drop Kid* | Lemon Drop Kid* |
| 2001 | Monarchos | Point Given* | Point Given* | Point Given* |
| 2002 | War Emblem* | War Emblem* | Sarava | Medaglia d'Oro |
| 2003 | Funny Cide* (Note: Funny Cide missed the Travers due to illness.) | Funny Cide* | Empire Maker | Ten Most Wanted |
| 2004 | Smarty Jones* | Smarty Jones* | Birdstone* | Birdstone* |
| 2005 | Giacomo | Afleet Alex* | Afleet Alex* | Flower Alley |
| 2006 | Barbaro | Bernardini* | Jazil | Bernardini* |
| 2007 | Street Sense* | Curlin | Rags to Riches | Street Sense* |
| 2008 | Big Brown* | Big Brown* | Da' Tara | Colonel John |
| 2009 | Mine That Bird | Rachel Alexandra | Summer Bird* | Summer Bird* |
| 2012 | I'll Have Another* | I'll Have Another* | Union Rags | Alpha & Golden Ticket |
| 2014 | California Chrome* | California Chrome* | Tonalist | V.E. Day |
| 2015 | American Pharoah* | American Pharoah* | American Pharoah* | Keen Ice |
| 2018 | Justify* | Justify* | Justify* | Catholic Boy |
| 2021 | Mandaloun | Rombauer | Essential Quality* | Essential Quality* |
| 2023 | Mage | National Treasure | Arcangelo* | Arcangelo* |
| 2025 | Sovereignty* | Journalism | Sovereignty* | Sovereignty* |
| 2026 | Golden Tempo* | Napoleon Solo | Golden Tempo* | Leading Change |

Notes

Gold: † Winner of the Grand Slam

Tan: Year one horse won three legs of the Grand Slam races

* Multiple Grand Slam race winner

List of horses that entered all four races, won multiple, though withdrew for various reasons:

4 wins: Kentucky - Preakness - Belmont - Travers

1 time, most recently Whirlaway in 1941

3 wins: Kentucky - Belmont - Travers

5 times, most recently Sovereignty in 2025

3 wins: Preakness - Belmont - Travers

7 times, most recently Point Given in 2001

3 wins: Kentucky - Preakness - Belmont

13 times, most recently Justify in 2018

== Breeders' Cup Classic Grand Slam ==
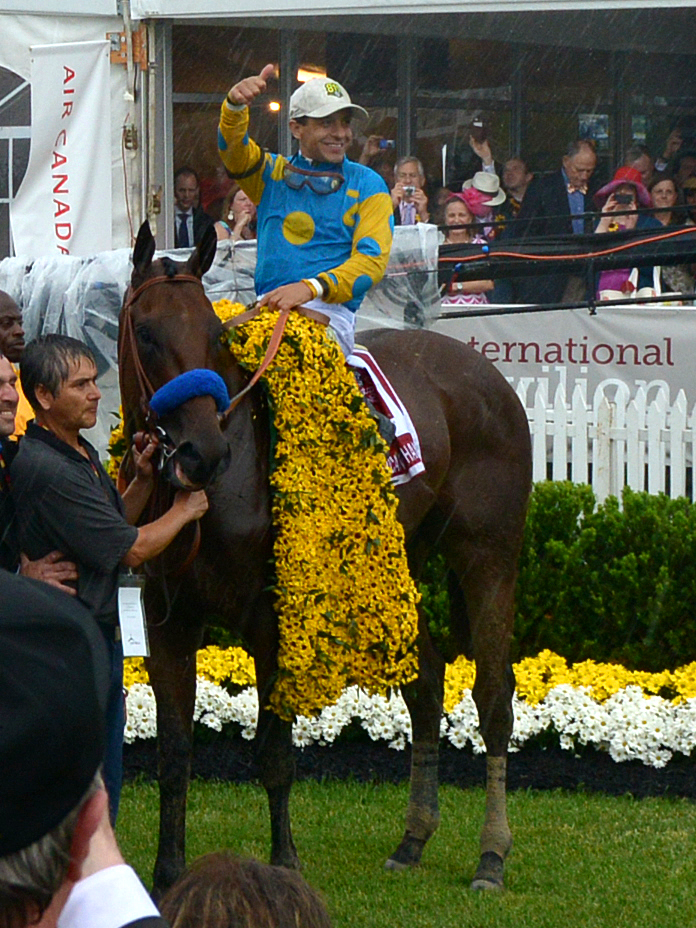
American Pharoah won the Breeders' Cup Classic Grand Slam in 2015 and was the first and currently only horse to accomplish the feat.

The Classic was first run in 1984, when the Breeders' Cup was inaugurated as a series of year-end championships. Unlike the Triple Crown races and the Travers Stakes, the Classic is not restricted to any age group and the Breeders' Cup has been hosted by several different tracks throughout its history.

For the first 32 runnings of the Classic, the Grand Slam was not in contention. In 2015, American Pharoah won the Triple Crown for the first time since 1978, making him the first horse eligible to compete for this configuration of the Grand Slam. Before the final race, sportswriter Bob Ehalt of ESPN declared American Pharoah was competing for the "Grand Slam," coining the second configuration of the term which quickly became popular. Pharoah won the Breeders' Cup Classic on October 31, 2015, and is the only horse to win this version of the Grand Slam.

This version of the Grand Slam differs from the Travers version because the Classic has no age restriction. Whereas the Triple Crown races and the Travers Stakes only adjust weight based on the horses' sex, the Classic also adjusts each horses' weight based on their age, a rule known as Weight for Age. Since the Breeders' Cup Classic was first run in 1984, most of the winners have been older than three-year-olds. Overall, fewer than half of the Classic winners of any age had entered any of the Triple Crown races when they were three-year-olds.

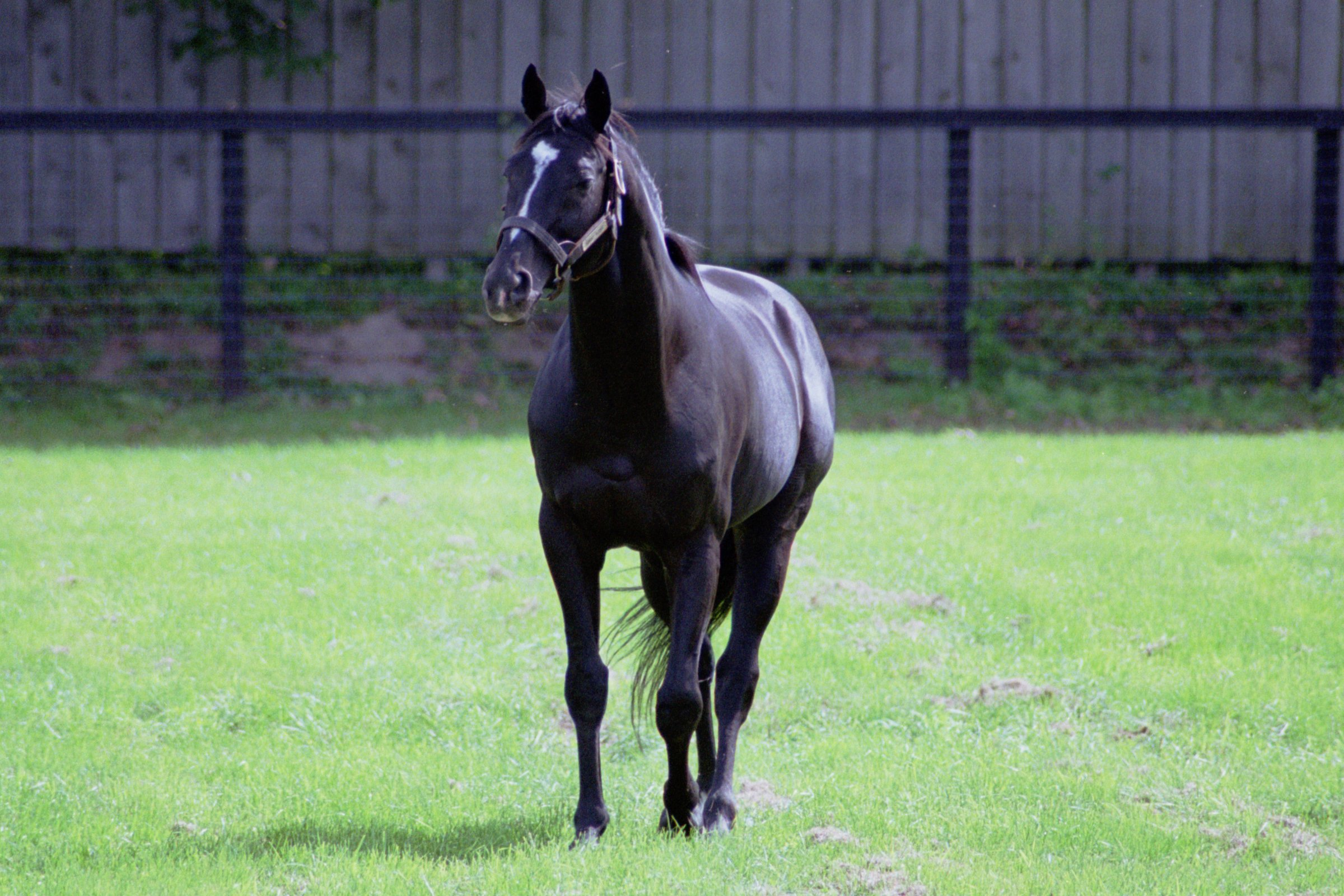
Sunday Silence came the closest to a Breeders Cup Classic Grand Slam in 1989 prior to American Pharoah's 2015 achievement.

Only six horses have won at least one Triple Crown race and the Classic in the same three-year-old season, including Pharoah. Sunday Silence won the Derby, Preakness, and Classic, but was second in the Belmont. Four horses, Unbridled in 1990, A. P. Indy in 1992, Curlin in 2007, and Authentic in 2020, have won the Classic and one Triple Crown race.

Justify is the only horse to win the Triple Crown and not compete in the Breeders' Cup Classic. His owners and trainer planned to run him in the 2018 Breeders' Cup Classic, but an injury was discovered in July and Justify was retired from racing.

Three horses have won at least one Triple Crown race as a three-year-old and the Breeders' Cup Classic as a four-year-old. Alysheba won two legs of the Triple Crown in 1987 and the Classic in 1988. Two other horses have won one Triple Crown race and the Classic as a four-year-old: Ferdinand, winning the 1986 Derby and 1987 Classic, and Drosselmeyer, winning the 2010 Belmont and 2011 Classic.

In 1989, Sunday Silence and Easy Goer had a fierce rivalry, with both finishing in the top 2 each race. Sunday Silence beat Easy Goer by two-and-a-half lengths in the Derby, a nose in the Preakness, and a neck in the Breeders' Cup Classic. Easy Goer won the Belmont by eight lengths.

=== At least two wins ===
| Year | Kentucky Derby | Preakness Stakes | Belmont Stakes | Breeders' Cup Classic |
|---|---|---|---|---|
| 1987 | Alysheba *# | Alysheba *# | Bet Twice | Ferdinand # |
| 1989 | Sunday Silence* | Sunday Silence* | Easy Goer (Note: Easy Goer finished second to Sunday Silence in the other three races) | Sunday Silence* |
| 1990 | Unbridled* | Summer Squall | Go And Go | Unbridled* |
| 1992 | Lil E. Tee | Pine Bluff | A.P. Indy (Note: A.P. Indy scratched the morning of the 1992 Kentucky Derby due to a bone bruise; he was the second favorite on the morning-line odds. He missed the Preakness as well due to the injury.) | A.P. Indy |
| 1994 | Go for Gin | Tabasco Cat* | Tabasco Cat* | Concern |
| 2002 | War Emblem* | War Emblem* | Sarava | Volponi |
| 2003 | Funny Cide* | Funny Cide* | Empire Maker | Pleasantly Perfect |
| 2005 | Giacomo | Afleet Alex (Note: Afleet Alex raced in all three of the Triple Crown legs and was expected to race in the Breeders' Cup Classic until an injury was discovered.) | Afleet Alex | Saint Liam |
| 2007 | Street Sense | Curlin* | Rags to Riches | Curlin* |
| 2014 | California Chrome* | California Chrome* | Tonalist | Bayern |
| 2015 | American Pharoah† | American Pharoah† | American Pharoah† | American Pharoah† |
| 2018 | Justify (Note: Justify was retired from racing in July 2018 after an injury was discovered. The owners and trainer had planned to run him in the Breeders' Cup Classic.) | Justify | Justify | Accelerate |
| 2025 | Sovereignty # | Journalism | Sovereignty # | Forever Young (JPN) |

Notes

† Winner of the Grand Slam

* Entered all four races & won multiple

# Won the Breeders' Cup Classic in four-year-old season after winning one or more Triple Crown races in three-year-old season

== Quintuple Crown ==
Racing historian Peter Lee has suggested winning all five races should be named the Quintuple Crown. While no horse has won all five races, several have competed in all five and won multiple since the Breeders' Cup Classic began in 1984. These include:

- Alysheba, who in 1987 competed in all five races but only won the Derby and Preakness as a three-year-old. In 1988, Alysheba entered the Breeders' Cup Classic again and won as a four-year-old.
- Tabasco Cat won the Preakness and Belmont.
- Easy Goer won the Belmont and Travers in 1989 but placed second in the Derby, Preakness, and Classic. The three losses were all close second-place finishes to rival Sunday Silence, who did not compete in the Travers.
- American Pharoah won the Triple Crown and Breeders' Cup Classic in 2015 but finished a close second in the Travers Stakes.

Note: Funny Cide competed in the 2003 Triple Crown and Breeders' Cup Classic but withdrew from the Travers due to illness. He won the Derby and Preakness.

== See also ==
- American thoroughbred racing top attended events
- Grand Slam of Grass
- Grand Slam (horse)
- Superfecta (betting)
