= 1941 in sports =

Note — many sporting events did not take place because of World War II

1941 in sports describes the year's events in world sport.

== American football ==
- NFL Championship: the Chicago Bears won 37–9 over the New York Giants at Wrigley Field
- Minnesota Golden Gophers – college football national champions.
- Chicago Bears win only meeting vs. Green Bay Packers in the playoffs. On January 23, 2011, they will meet again in the playoffs.
- At a college game in Youngstown, Ohio, game officials use a penalty flag for the first time.

== Association football ==
- La Liga won by Atlético Aviación
- German football championship won by SK Rapid Wien
- Serie A won by Bologna
- Primeira Liga won by Sporting CP
- There is no major football competition in England, Scotland or France due to World War II. In England, several regional leagues are played but statistics from these are not counted in players’ figures.

== Australian rules football ==
- Victorian Football League
  - Melbourne wins the 45th VFL Premiership, beating Essendon 19.13 (127) to 13.20 (98) in the 1941 VFL Grand Final
  - Brownlow Medal awarded to Norman Ware (Footscray)
- South Australian National Football League:
  - 4 October: Norwood 14.16 (100) beats Sturt 10.11 (71) for their nineteenth premiership but first since 1929.
- Western Australian National Football League:
  - 11 October: West Perth 14.14 (98) beat East Fremantle 10.17 (77) to win their eighth WANFL premiership.

== Baseball ==
- New York Yankees win the World Series, beating Brooklyn Dodgers by 4 games to 1
- Ted Williams records a season batting average of .406; it is the last time a major leaguer hit over .400
- Joe DiMaggio's 56-game hitting streak (May 15 – July 16)

== Basketball ==
NBL Championship

- Oshkosh All-Stars over Sheboygan Redskins (3–0)

Events

- Ninth South American Basketball Championship in Mendoza is won by Argentina.

== Boxing ==
Events

- The highlight of the year is the World Heavyweight title fight between two current world champions, Joe Louis and Billy Conn, won by Louis with a 13th-round knockout.

Lineal world champions

- World Heavyweight Championship – Joe Louis
- World Light Heavyweight Championship – Billy Conn
- World Middleweight Championship – vacant → Tony Zale
- World Welterweight Championship – Fritzie Zivic → Freddie "Red" Cochrane
- World Lightweight Championship – Lew Jenkins → Sammy Angott
- World Featherweight Championship – Harry Jeffra → Joey Archibald → Albert "Chalky" Wright
- World Bantamweight Championship – Lou Salica
- World Flyweight Championship – vacant

== Cricket ==
England and South Africa

- There is no first-class cricket in England or South Africa due to World War II.

India

- Ranji Trophy – Maharashtra defeats Madras by six wickets.
- Bombay Pentangular – Hindus

Australia

- During the 1940–41 season, although the Sheffield Shield is not contested, a number of interstate cricket matches are played for patriotic funding. For the 1941–42 season, seven three-day interstate matches are scheduled but only one is played before the urgency of the Pacific War puts an end to Australian first-class cricket until November 1945.

New Zealand and West Indies

- New Zealand abandons the Plunket Shield for 1940–41 but here, and in the West Indies, a small number of first-class matches are arranged and played each season until after the war without being part of an official competition.

== Cycling ==
Tour de France

- not contested due to World War II

Giro d'Italia

- not contested due to World War II

== Figure skating ==
World Figure Skating Championships

- not contested due to World War II

== Golf ==
Men's professional

- Masters Tournament – Craig Wood
- 1941 U.S. Open – Craig Wood
- British Open – not played due to World War II
- PGA Championship – Vic Ghezzi

Men's amateur

- British Amateur – not played due to World War II
- U.S. Amateur – Bud Ward

Women's professional

- Women's Western Open – Patty Berg
- Titleholders Championship – Dorothy Kirby

== Horse racing ==
Steeplechases

- Cheltenham Gold Cup – Poet Prince
- Grand National – not held due to World War II

Hurdle races

- Champion Hurdle – Seneca

Flat races

- Australia – Melbourne Cup won by Skipton
- Canada – King's Plate won by Budpath
- France – Prix de l'Arc de Triomphe won by Le Pacha
- Ireland – Irish Derby Stakes won by Sol Oriens
- English Triple Crown Races:
  1. 2,000 Guineas Stakes – Lambert Simnel
  2. The Derby – Owen Tudor
  3. St. Leger Stakes – Sun Castle
- United States Triple Crown Races:
  1. Kentucky Derby – Whirlaway
  2. Preakness Stakes – Whirlaway
  3. Belmont Stakes – Whirlaway

== Ice hockey ==
- Stanley Cup – Boston Bruins defeat the Detroit Red Wings 4 games to 0.

== Rowing ==
The Boat Race

- Oxford and Cambridge Boat Race is not contested due to World War II

== Rugby league ==
- 1941 New Zealand rugby league season
- 1941 NSWRFL season
- 1940–41 Northern Rugby Football League Wartime Emergency League season / 1941–42 Northern Rugby Football League Wartime Emergency League season

== Rugby union ==
- Five Nations Championship series is not contested due to World War II

== Speed skating ==
Speed Skating World Championships

- not contested due to World War II

== Tennis ==
Australia

- Australian Men's Singles Championship – not contested
- Australian Women's Singles Championship – not contested

England

- Wimbledon Men's Singles Championship – not contested
- Wimbledon Women's Singles Championship – not contested

France

- French Men's Singles Championship – Bernard Destremau (France) defeats Robert Ramillon (France) 6–4, 2–6, 6–3, 6–4
- French Women's Singles Championship – Alice Weiwers (Luxembourg) defeats Anne-Marie Seghers (France) 6–0, 6–2

USA

- American Men's Singles Championship – Bobby Riggs (USA) defeats Frank Kovacs (USA) 5–7, 6–1, 6–3, 6–3
- American Women's Singles Championship – Sarah Palfrey Cooke (USA) defeats Pauline Betz Addie (USA) 7–5, 6–2

Davis Cup

- 1941 International Lawn Tennis Challenge – not contested

== Awards ==
- Associated Press Male Athlete of the Year – Joe DiMaggio, Major League Baseball
- Associated Press Female Athlete of the Year – Betty Hicks Newell, golf
