= Henri Jelliss =

Belgian jockey (1891–1971)

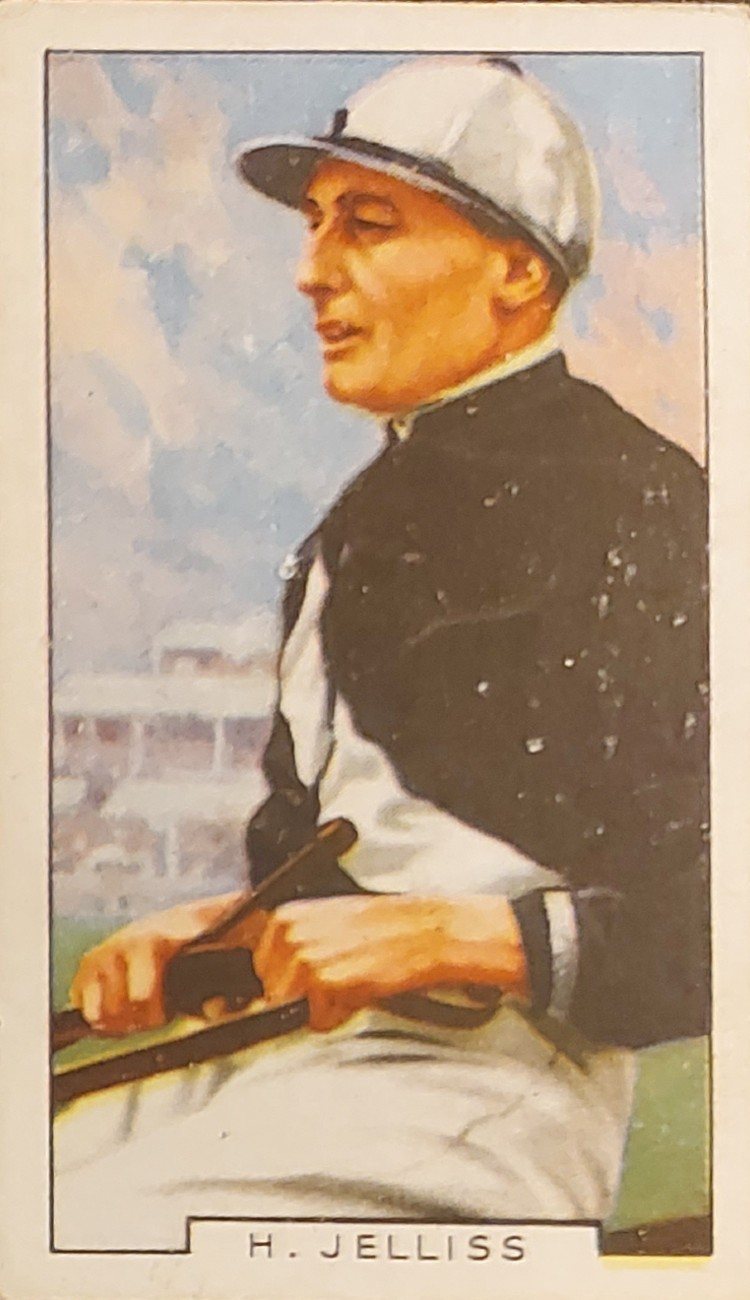
- Henri Jelliss in the colours of Lord Stanley, from a 1936 Gallaher's cigarette card

Personal information
- Born: 23 November 1891 Mons, Belgium
- Died: 16 January 1971 (aged 79)
- Occupations: Jockey and trainer

Horse racing career
- Sport: Horse racing

Major racing wins
- British Classic Races: (as a jockey); St Leger Stakes (1927); Oaks Stakes (1929, 1935) (as a trainer); 2,000 Guineas (1946); Other major races: Nunthorpe Stakes (1935)

Significant horses
- Book Law, Happy Knight, Pennycomequick, Quashed, Shalfleet
- Updated on 22 October 2023

Henri Jelliss (November 23, 1891 – January 16, 1971) was a Belgian jockey and trainer, who won three British Classics as a jockey in the 1920s and 30s and a further one as a trainer in the 1940s.

== Riding career ==
Henri Albert Jelliss was born in Mons, Belgium, on 23 November 1891. His father was the 13-times Belgian Champion Jockey, Charles Jelliss.

Henri served his apprenticeship with Tom Jennings, Jr. and his first winner came in an apprentice race at Warwick on Beriberi on 6 April 1908. In 1910, he rode 39 winners at a weight of just six stone. In 1911, he landed a large stable gamble when winning the November Handicap on The Valet and another when winning the 1912 Cambridgeshire on Long Set for Solly Joel. In 1915, he rode over hurdles, finishing unplaced on his first ride, Little by Little, at Leicester on 26 January. Then, in 1921, he won the Cambridgeshire on Yutoi.

It was some time before he experienced Classic success in the 1927 St Leger.| He would go on to add two Oaks victories - the first on Pennycomequick in 1929, the second a memorable short head victory in 1935 on Quashed, the stable's second string.

In 1934, he won the Ayr Gold Cup on Figaro, and in 1935, two valuable races - the Nunthorpe and Portland on sprinter Shalfleet. His last big win came in the 1936 Portland on the same horse. But with opportunities limited because of his weight, at the end of the 1936 season he retired, alongside Freddie Fox, Bobbie Dick and Johnny Dines.

== Training career ==
After he retired as a jockey, he trained from his father-in-law's stable at Beverley House, Newmarket. His first runner was a horse he owned himself, Paladin, who won the Chaplin Plate at Lincoln on the second day of the season under Bill Rickaby. Two years later he had a Royal Ascot winner when America, ridden by R. A. Jones won the Wokingham Stakes.

Other owners who used his services were Lord Willoughby de Broke and Sir William Cooke for whom he would train Happy Knight to win the 1946 2,000 Guineas.

His final winner was Guitarist at Newmarket at the end of 1961. After retirement, he played golf and did gardening. He died aged 79 on 16 January 1971.

== Personal life ==
On 25 September 1926, he killed two women whilst driving but was exonerated when the deaths were ruled accidental at a hearing on 7 October 1926.

His son, Charles Henri (1916–1982) was also a jockey.

He was best man at the wedding of fellow jockey Albert Whalley.

== Major wins (as a jockey) ==
(United Kingdom) Great Britain

- Nunthorpe Stakes - Shalfleet (1935)
- St Leger Stakes - Book Law (1927)
- Oaks Stakes - (2) - Pennycomequick (1929), Quashed (1935)

== Major wins (as a trainer) ==
(United Kingdom) Great Britain

- 2,000 Guineas Stakes - Happy Knight (1946)

== See also ==
- List of jockeys

== Bibliography ==
- Mortimer, Roger; Onslow, Richard; Willett, Peter (1978). Biographical Encyclopaedia of British Racing. London: Macdonald and Jane's. ISBN 0-354-08536-0.
