= 2015 Breeders' Cup Classic =

Thoroughbred horse race

32nd Breeders' Cup Classic
- Breeders' Cup Classic
- Location: Keeneland
- Date: October 31, 2015
- Winning horse: American Pharoah
- Jockey: Victor Espinoza
- Trainer: Bob Baffert
- Owner: Ahmed Zayat
- Conditions: fast
- Surface: Dirt
- Attendance: 50,155

The 2015 Breeders' Cup Classic was the 32nd running of the Breeders' Cup Classic, part of the 2015 Breeders' Cup World Thoroughbred Championships program. It was run on October 31, 2015, at Keeneland in Lexington, Kentucky.

Triple-crown winner American Pharoah was heavily favored for the race and won in a wire-to-wire performance. In doing so, he became the first horse to complete the Grand Slam of Thoroughbred racing, consisting of America's four most prestigious races: the Kentucky Derby, Preakness Stakes, Belmont Stakes and Breeders' Cup Classic.

The Classic was run on dirt at one mile and one-quarter (approximately 2000 m) with a purse of $5,000,000. It was run under weight-for-age conditions, with entrants carrying the following weights:

- Northern Hemisphere three-year-olds: 122 lb
- Southern Hemisphere three-year-olds: 117 lb
- Four-year-olds and up: 126 lb
- Fillies and mares receive an allowance of 3 lb

== Contenders ==
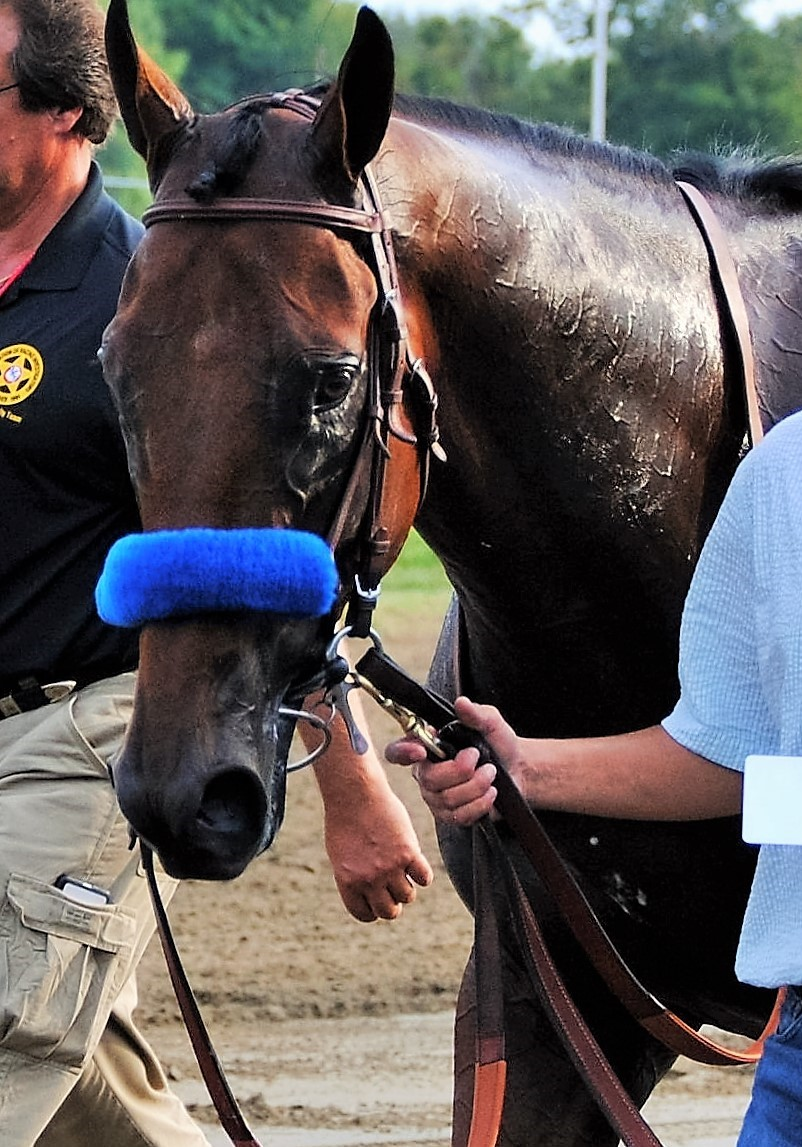
American Pharoah was drained by his effort in the Travers

American Pharoah (program #4) was made the 6-5 morning line favorite based on his wins in the Triple Crown and Haskell Invitational. However, he lost the Travers Stakes in late August, after which his owner Ahmed Zayat had contemplated retiring the horse. "My gut's saying if the horse showed me he's tailed off, that he's not the Pharoah I know, then there's no question in my mind that the right thing is to retire him," said Zayat shortly after the race. "He doesn't owe me or anybody anything."

A few days later, Zayat had reconsidered and announced that American Pharoah would race once more. "The champ deserves another chance. He won the Triple Crown and deserves to be in the sport's premier year-end event." American Pharoah came into the Classic off a two-month layoff and was also facing older horses for the first time.

The Breeders' Cup Classic was first run in 1984, whereas the last Triple Crown winner before American Pharoah was Affirmed in 1978. Therefore, 2015 was the first opportunity for a horse to complete what journalists dubbed the "Grand Slam": winning the Kentucky Derby, Preakness, Belmont and Breeders' Cup Classic in the same year.

Beholder (#10) was second choice on the morning line at 3–1, having won six straight races including an impressive win against males in the Pacific Classic. As Beholder had a similar running style to American Pharoah, she had been expected to press the pace. However, Beholder developed an illness a few days before the Classic and had to be scratched.

Liam's Map, winner of the Woodward Stakes, would have been a strong contender in the Classic but his connections elected to run in the Breeders' Cup Dirt Mile instead.

The remaining rivals for American Pharoah were:

- Tonalist (#1) – 6–1 on the morning line – winner of the 2014 Belmont Stakes and the Jockey Club Gold Cup in both 2014 and 2015
- Keen Ice (#2) – 12-1 – winner of the Travers Stakes, defeating American Pharoah
- Frosted (#3) – 15-1 – winner of the Wood Memorial and Pennsylvania Derby, runner-up to American Pharoah in the Belmont
- Gleneagles (#5) – 20-1 – winner of the 2000 Guineas, Irish 2000 and St James Palace
- Effinex (#6) – 30-1 – winner of the Suburban Handicap
- Hard Aces (#8) – 50-1 – winner of the Gold Cup at Santa Anita
- Honor Code (#9) – 6-1 – winner of the Metropolitan Mile and Whitney Handicap

Smooth Roller (#7) was a late scratch due to a tendon injury.

== Race description ==
Without Liam's Map, Smooth Roller and Beholder in the race, American Pharoah was expected to be able to get an unchallenged lead, which would allow him to set a comfortable pace and make it harder for others to close ground. Accordingly, his odds shortened from 6–5 on the morning line to 3–5 at post-time. Honor Code became the second favorite and was expected to make a strong late run, but a slow pace would make his task more difficult.

The race played out much as expected. American Pharoah broke well and took command, demonstrating a high cruising speed that kept him in the lead while conserving energy. Only Effinex stayed close, with the two running one-two for the entire race. American Pharoah pulled away in Keeneland's long stretch to win by over six lengths while setting a track record. Honor Code made his expected late run but finished well back in third.

After the race, Zayat commented: "I said it once and more than once that this race was only about American Pharoah – we wanted him to go out as a winner just for the horse. He had run so hard and brilliantly for such a long time. I doubt we will ever see a horse who is able to take what he has done in terms of shipping in and out and going to seven or eight different tracks. He doesn't care about the surface or where he is sitting, he just does it all."

"He gave everyone what they came to see today," said his trainer Bob Baffert. "I've never seen anything like him; I've never trained anything like him. I'm just glad Pharoah goes out the champ he is."

== Results ==
Finish	Program Number	Margin (lengths)	Horse	Jockey	Trainer	Final Odds	Winnings
1st	4	6 1/2	American Pharoah	Victor Espinoza	Bob Baffert	0.70	2,750,000
2nd	6	4 1/2	Effinex	Mike Smith	James Jerkens	33.00	900,000
3rd	9	1 1/2	Honor Code	Javier Castellano	Claude McGaughey III	4.70	500,000
4th	2	Nose	Keen Ice	Irad Ortiz Jr.	Dale Romans	9.70	300,000
5th	1	Nose	Tonalist	John Velazquez	Christophe Clement	6.00	100,000
6th	8	Head	Hard Aces	Joseph Talamo	John Sadler	72.80	
7th	3	12 1/2	Frosted	Joel Rosario	Kiaran McLaughlin	11.30	
8th	5		Gleneagles	Ryan Moore	Aidan O'Brien	11.10	

Source: Equibase

Times: 1/4 – 0:23.99; 1/2 – 0:47.50; 3/4 – 1:11.21; mile – 1:35.47; final – 2:00.07.
Fractional Splits: (:23.99) (:23.51) (:23.71) (:24.26) (:24.60)

== Payout ==
Payout Schedule:

Program Number	Horse	Win	Place	Show
4	American Pharoah	3.40	3.00	2.40
6	Effinex		14.20	6.60
9	Honor Code			3.40

- $2 Exacta (4–6) Paid $76.40
- $2 Trifecta (4–6–9) Paid $322.60
- $2 Superfecta (4–6–9–2) Paid $1,274.00
