= Pensive =

American-bred Thoroughbred racehorse

- Sire: Hyperion
- Grandsire: Gainsborough
- Dam: Penicuik
- Damsire: Buchan
- Sex: Stallion
- Foaled: 1941
- Country: United States
- Color: Chestnut
- Breeder: Calumet Farm
- Owner: Calumet Farm
- Trainer: Ben A. Jones
- Record: 22:7-5-4
- Earnings: $167,715

Major wins
- Champagne Stakes (1943); Oden Bowie Stakes (1943); Rowe Memorial Handicap (1944) Triple Crown race wins: Kentucky Derby (1944); Preakness Stakes (1944)
- Last updated on September 22, 2006

Pensive (February 5, 1941 – May 20, 1948) was a bright chestnut Thoroughbred racehorse that in 1944 won the first two legs of the U.S. Triple Crown. Pensive also began only the second sire line "hat trick" in the Kentucky Derby, as his son Ponder won the 1949 Derby, and Ponder's son Needles won the 1956 edition.

== Background ==
He was sired by Hyperion, out of Penicuik II (by Buchan). Pensive was brought to the United States still in utero by Arthur B. Hancock, who then sold the mare to the owner of Calumet Farm, Warren Wright. Wright had inherited Calumet from his father, William Monroe Wright, president of the Calumet Baking Powder Company. Pensive began his training under Calumet's future Hall of Fame trainer Ben A. Jones.

== Racing career ==
At two, Pensive raced five times, winning twice. His three losses all came in stakes races. At three, he ran a checkered season, winning and losing fairly equally. He beat older horses in the Rowe Memorial Handicap, but lost to an older horse, Tola Rose, in the Bowie Handicap. Tola Rose had defeated Whirlaway in the Butler Memorial Handicap.

Pensive, ridden by Conn McCreary, won the Kentucky Derby going away by four and a half lengths. A week later, he took the Preakness. That year, the Belmont (at the time the least of the three races), had upped its purse to $50,000. Pensive was in the lead when Bounding Home inched by to take the race by less than half a length.

Following his loss in the Belmont, Pensive lost all eight of his final starts.

== Stud record ==
Pensive was retired to stud, producing the winner of the 1949 Kentucky Derby, Ponder. He died 13 days after Ponder's win. Pensive is buried at Calumet Farm.

== Sire line tree ==
- Pensive
  - Ponder
    - Needles
  - Theory
  - Cyclotron
    - Barnaby's Bluff

== Pedigree ==
Pedigree of Pensive
Sire Hyperion ch. 1930	Gainsborough bay 1915	Bayardo	Bay Ronald
Sire Hyperion ch. 1930	Gainsborough bay 1915	Bayardo	Galicia
Sire Hyperion ch. 1930	Gainsborough bay 1915	Rosedrop	St Frusquin*
Sire Hyperion ch. 1930	Gainsborough bay 1915	Rosedrop	Rosaline
Sire Hyperion ch. 1930	Selene bay 1919	Chaucer	St Simon*
Sire Hyperion ch. 1930	Selene bay 1919	Chaucer	Canterbury Pilgrim
Sire Hyperion ch. 1930	Selene bay 1919	Serenissima	Minoru
Sire Hyperion ch. 1930	Selene bay 1919	Serenissima	Gondolette
Dam Penicuik ch. 1934	Buchan bay 1916	Sunstar	Sundridge
Dam Penicuik ch. 1934	Buchan bay 1916	Sunstar	Doris
Dam Penicuik ch. 1934	Buchan bay 1916	Hamoaze	Torpoint
Dam Penicuik ch. 1934	Buchan bay 1916	Hamoaze	Maid of the Mist
Dam Penicuik ch. 1934	Pennycomequick brown 1926	Hurry On	Marcovil
Dam Penicuik ch. 1934	Pennycomequick brown 1926	Hurry On	Tout Suite
Dam Penicuik ch. 1934	Pennycomequick brown 1926	Plymstock	Polymelus
Dam Penicuik ch. 1934	Pennycomequick brown 1926	Plymstock	Winkipop

* Pensive is inbred 5S x 4S to the stallion St Simon, meaning that he appears fifth generation (via St Frusquin) and fourth generation on the sire side of his pedigree.
