= Ponder (horse) =

American-bred Thoroughbred racehorse

- Sire: Pensive
- Grandsire: Hyperion
- Dam: Miss Rushin
- Damsire: Blenheim
- Sex: Stallion
- Foaled: April 14, 1946
- Country: USA
- Colour: Dark Brown
- Breeder: Calumet Farm
- Owner: Calumet Farm
- Trainer: Ben A. Jones
- Record: 41 Starts: 14 – 7 - 4
- Earnings: $542,275

Major wins
- Kentucky Derby (1949); American Derby (1949); Arlington Classic (1949); Jockey Club Gold Cup (1949); Lawrence Realization Stakes (1949); Peter Pan Stakes (1949); Santa Anita Maturity (1950); Arlington Handicap (1950); San Antonio Handicap (1950); Tanforan Handicap (1950); Marchbank Handicap (1950)
- Last updated on September 16, 2008

Ponder (April 14, 1946 – October 10, 1958) was an American Thoroughbred racehorse who won the Kentucky Derby in 1949.

== Background ==
Ponder was the son of the 1944 Kentucky Derby winner, Pensive, and sire of the winner of the 1956 Kentucky Derby, Needles. Pensive, Ponder, and Needles are the second family of grandfather, father, and son to win the Kentucky Derby (the first were Reigh Count in 1928, 1943 Triple Crown winner Count Fleet, and Count Turf in 1951). His dam Miss Rushin was descended from the Irish broodmare Orris (foaled 1917) whose other descendants included Souverain.

A Calumet Farm foal, trained by the Hall of Fame conditioner Ben Jones, Ponder was a closer. Jones claimed that if the horse had given himself more time to catch up more often, he would have won a lot more of his races.

== Racing career ==
Ponder ran in the same years as his stable mates Coaltown and Citation, but they were both one year older. He also competed against the very good Greentree Stable's Capot, who took the Preakness Stakes and the Belmont Stakes in 1949. Ponder lost all four of his two-year-old starts. On January 3, 1949, at age three, he broke his maiden at Tropical Park and then won two more races, but Jones still thought of him as a lesser contender for Calumet in the '49 Derby. His other possibility was a colt called De Luxe. Then Ponder finished a fast-closing second by a length to Olympia in the Derby Trial. He left Capot five lengths behind. Considering that Olympia was a winner on both coasts and the odds-on favorite to win the Derby, Jones was impressed.

In the Derby, Olympia led for the first mile with Capot on his heels. Ridden by Hall of Fame jockey Steve Brooks, Ponder was last. He was twelfth after six furlongs and sixth as the field turned for home. Then Ponder began to rally. His gain was described as "relentless," sweeping him past the rest of the field to win the Derby by three lengths. Capot held on for second, while Olympia faded to sixth. Ponder ran the last quarter in about :23 4/5.

At that time, the Preakness Stakes was more suited to a speed horse with its short home stretch. Capot was a front runner, and the Preakness fit him well. In the race, Ponder was gaining momentum but ran out of racing room. In their next encounter, the Peter Pan Stakes, the turns were wider and when Ponder got going from his usual slow start, he beat Capot by ten lengths. In the Belmont Stakes, Ponder began it as he did in the Kentucky Derby, but by now Capot's jockey Ted Atkinson knew his rival. Instead of forcing the pace, he kept it slow, allowing Capot to have just enough left to withstand Ponder's fast late charge.

Ponder lost his next two races, as did Capot. On July 30, they met for the last time in the Arlington Classic. Capot finished 14 lengths behind Ponder, whose late kick was perfect for the track. Next Ponder came in second to the older Coaltown, both running a world record mile, and then he won the American Derby over Kentucky Colonel and John's Joy and came in third by a head and a neck in the Narragansett Special, with additional wins in the Lawrence Realization Stakes and the Jockey Club Gold Cup (ridden by Eddie Arcaro). Because of his Belmont and Preakness victories, Capot edged out Ponder as American Champion Three-Year-Old Male Horse for 1949.

In California on February 11, 1950, in his four-year-old season, Ponder took the San Antonio Handicap from the older Citation. Third was the Irish-bred Noor, another "come-from-behind" runner, imported from the United Kingdom after modest success. In an overnight prep, Ponder lost to Your Host but beat Hill Prince, who came in third and later won 1950 American Horse of the Year honors.

== Stud record ==
When Ponder went to stud at Calumet, he produced Needles in his first crop. Ponder died in 1958.

== Pedigree ==
Pedigree of Ponder, brown stallion, 1946
Sire Pensive (USA) 1941	Hyperion (GB); 1930	Gainsborough	Bayardo
Sire Pensive (USA) 1941	Hyperion (GB); 1930	Gainsborough	Rosedrop
Sire Pensive (USA) 1941	Hyperion (GB); 1930	Selene	Chaucer
Sire Pensive (USA) 1941	Hyperion (GB); 1930	Selene	Serenissima
Sire Pensive (USA) 1941	Pencuik (GB); 1934	Buchan	Sunstar
Sire Pensive (USA) 1941	Pencuik (GB); 1934	Buchan	Hamoaze
Sire Pensive (USA) 1941	Pencuik (GB); 1934	Pennycomequick	Hurry On
Sire Pensive (USA) 1941	Pencuik (GB); 1934	Pennycomequick	Plymstock
Dam Miss Rushin (USA) 1942	Blenheim (GB); 1927	Blandford	Swynford
Dam Miss Rushin (USA) 1942	Blenheim (GB); 1927	Blandford	Blanche*
Dam Miss Rushin (USA) 1942	Blenheim (GB); 1927	Malva	Charles O'Malley
Dam Miss Rushin (USA) 1942	Blenheim (GB); 1927	Malva	Wild Arum
Dam Miss Rushin (USA) 1942	Lady Erne (USA); 1934	Sir Gallahad	Teddy
Dam Miss Rushin (USA) 1942	Lady Erne (USA); 1934	Sir Gallahad	Plucky Liege
Dam Miss Rushin (USA) 1942	Lady Erne (USA); 1934	Erne	White Eagle*
Dam Miss Rushin (USA) 1942	Lady Erne (USA); 1934	Erne	Orris (Family: 23)

* Ponder is inbred 5D x 4D to the stallion White Eagle, meaning that he appears fifth generation (via Blanche) and fourth generation on the sire side of his pedigree.
