= 2015 Breeders' Cup =

Thoroughbred horse racing event

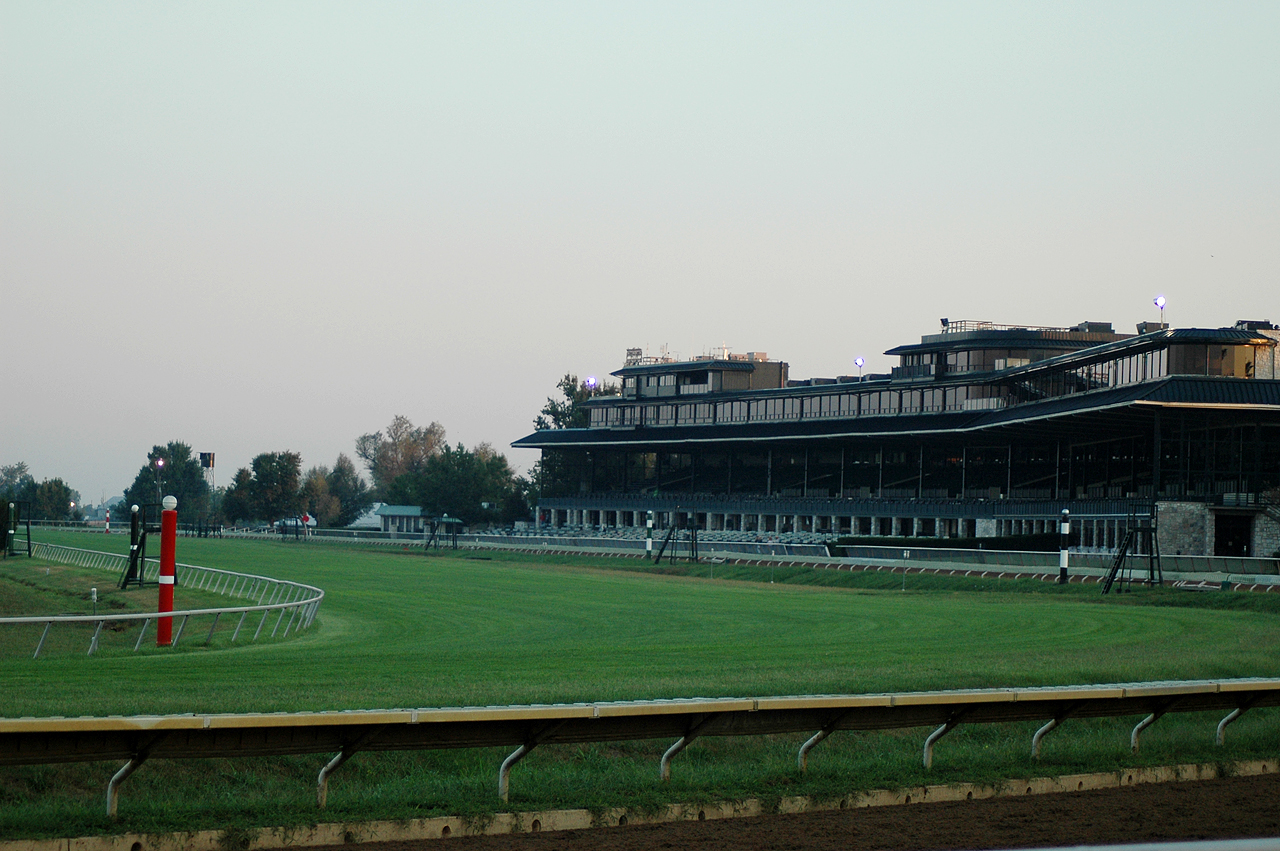
- Keeneland racecourse
- Class: Championship Event Series
- Location: Lexington, Kentucky
- Race type: Thoroughbred
- Website: www.breederscup.com

Race information
- Distance: See individual races
- Surface: Turf, Dirt
- Purse: Varies by Race; Between $1,000,000 – $5 million

The 2015 Breeders' Cup World Championships was the 32nd edition of the thoroughbred horse racing season-ending premier event held on October 30 and 31 at Keeneland in Lexington, Kentucky. The race series, held for the first time at Keeneland, required a significant amount of preparation to transform the small, historic track into a venue capable of handling large crowds, comprising 13 championship races held over a two-day period.

The highlight of the series was the victory of American Pharoah in the Breeders' Cup Classic, becoming the first horse in history to complete the Grand Slam of Thoroughbred racing, the three Triple Crown races plus the Classic. In the process he set a track record before a record crowd for the Keeneland facility.

== Breeders' Cup Challenge series ==
The Breeders' Cup Challenge is a series of races that provide the winners of designated races with automatic "Win and You're In" berths in a specified division of the Breeders' Cup. For qualifying horses, the Breeders' Cup organization covers the entry fee and provides a travel allowance of up to $40,000 for the connections of horses from overseas. Thirty-nine horses entered in the Breeders' Cup races qualified via the challenge series, including six of the winners. These were:

- American Pharoah, who qualified for the Classic by winning the Haskell Invitational
- Stephanie's Kitten, who won the Flower Bowl Invitational to qualify for the Filly & Mare Turf
- Nyquist, won the FrontRunner to qualify for the Juvenile
- Songbird, who earned her berth for the Juvenile Fillies in the Chandelier
- Runhappy, who qualified for the Sprint by winning the Phoenix Stakes
- Catch a Glimpse, who won the Natalma Stakes to qualify for the Juvenile Fillies Turf

== Event preparation ==
In 2014, the management of Keeneland began to replace the synthetic Polytrack racing surface of its main race track with dirt. While the synthetic surface, installed in 2006, was considered safer for horses, it also was not popular with horse owners because it was too different from the dirt tracks where many major races were held. Returning the track to a dirt surface was a significant factor in Keeneland's bid to host the Breeders' Cup in 2015. The Keeneland bid was successful and was officially announced on June 24, 2014.

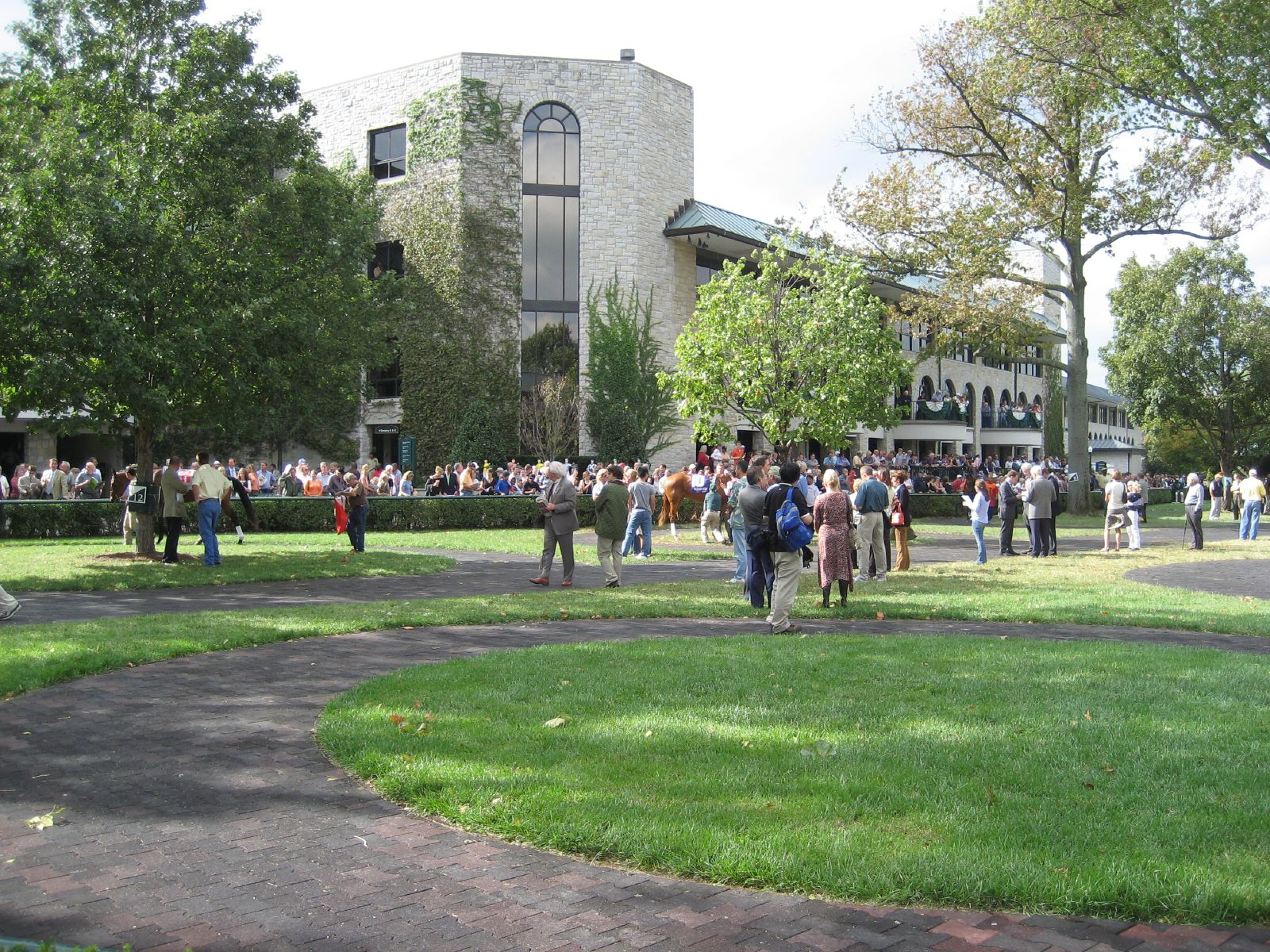
The Keeneland paddock area

2015 was the first year that the Breeders' Cup had ever been held at Keeneland. A track built in 1935 as "a model race track, to perpetuate racing in the proper manner", it had never handled crowds of the size anticipated for the Breeders' Cup and thousands of temporary seats had to be added without removing trees or otherwise changing the classic appearance of the facility. But with a 1,100 acres (450 ha) facility, there was room to be flexibile. Track management decided to only offer 28,000 reserved seats and further required that all tickets for both reserved and general admission be purchased in advance. They created seating in buildings adjacent to the existing grandstands and set up large tents and other temporary facilities, plus two tailgate areas with big-screen televisions for additional spectators. Keeneland's organizers estimated they would be able to host about 45,000 people.

The configuration of the Keeneland racetrack is unique compared to previous Breeders' Cup venues, requiring some races to be held at different distances than previous Breeders' Cups. The dirt track is a 1 1/16 miles (1,700 m) oval with two possible finish lines, and the turf course is 7 1/2 furlongs (0.875 miles (1,408 m)) with a 1,190 feet (360 m) homestretch that is one of the longest in the United States. The use of the alternate finish line on the dirt course for the Dirt Mile, Juvenile, and Juvenile Fillies raised the possibility of confusing the jockeys, and the long turf stretch was viewed as giving a heavy advantage to closers.

The Breeders' Cup Dirt Mile had an unorthodox setup because Keeneland does not regularly hold 1–mile dirt races. To get the proper distance while maximizing the run-up to the first turn, the starting gate was set 70 yards (64 m) in front of the one-mile pole, where the timer would start, and the finishing line was set at the track's alternate finish line at the 1/16 mile pole, thus the race was slightly longer than a mile for the horses. Keeneland held four races at that distance in the 2015 Fall meet to test the configuration.

The Filly & Mare Turf was conducted at 1 3/16 miles because the track's turf course configuration does not allow for the usual distance of 1 1/4 mile.

Also due to the configuration of the turf course, the Turf Sprint was held at 5 1/2 furlongs for the first time the history of the race, which had been run since 2008. Previously, the race was about 6 1/2 furlongs when held on the "downhill turf course" at Santa Anita Racetrack and 5 furlongs when held at Churchill Downs.

== Results ==
The attendance at the 2015 Breeders' Cup set a record for the Keeneland race course. Over two days, total attendance was 95,102. Attendance on Friday, October 30, at 44,947, was the highest for a Friday since the Breeders' Cup became a two-day event in 2007. It also broke Keeneland's previous one-day record of 40,617, set in 2012. The attendance on Saturday was 50,155. While the total attendance figure over two days was not a Breeders' Cup record, (Note: The record was 80,452, at the 1998 Breeders' Cup at Churchill Downs set in 1998.) the Keeneland facility received high marks for its facilities.

While the total parimutuel wagering handle was comparable to other years, at $150,574,656, the figures for bets at the Keeneland track itself were higher than the handle in the previous year when the Breeders' Cup was at Santa Anita Racetrack. Wagering on all races Friday, including the six non-Breeders' Cup races held earlier in the day was $44,949,165 total, 1.9% lower than in 2014, but with $7,550,279 of that bet at Keeneland, which was an 8% increase for betting on-site.

Each day's program included several undercard stakes races. Friday had 10 races total, four of which were Breeders' Cup championships. The most-anticipated race on Friday was the Breeders' Cup Distaff for fillies and mares, won by the four-year-old campaigner, Stopchargingmaria. Saturday hosted 12 races, nine of which were part of the Breeders' Cup program, including the Breeders' Cup Turf, which drew the British-bred Epsom Derby and Prix de l'Arc de Triomphe winner Golden Horn and the much-anticipated Breeders' Cup Classic, where American Pharoah would challenge older horses for the first time in his career. For both horses, their contests would be the last time each would race before being retired to stud. Golden Horn struggled with the sand-based turf course and was second to the Irish filly Found. American Pharoah, coming off of a defeat in his previous race and a two-month layoff, led wire-to-wire in the Classic and won by 6 1/2 lengths, becoming the first horse to win the Grand Slam of Thoroughbred racing, consisting of the Triple Crown plus the Classic. With his win, he also broke the Keeneland track record for the 1 1/4 miles (2.0 km) distance.

=== Friday, October 30 ===
| Race name | Post time (EDT) | Sponsor | Distance/Surface | Restrictions | Purse | Winner (Bred) |
|---|---|---|---|---|---|---|
| Juvenile Turf | 3:30p | | 1 mile (Turf) | 2-year-old colts and geldings | $1 million | Hit It A Bomb |
| Dirt Mile | 4:10p | City of Las Vegas | 1 mile | 3 yrs+ | $1 million | Liam's Map |
| Juvenile Fillies Turf | 4:50p | | 1 mile (Turf) | 2-year-old fillies | $1 million | Catch A Glimpse |
| Distaff | 5:35p | Longines | 1 1/8 miles | 3 yrs+ fillies & mares | $2 million | Stopchargingmaria |

=== Saturday, October 31 ===
| Race Name | Post time (EDT) | Sponsor | Distance/Surface | Restrictions | Purse | Winner (Bred) |
|---|---|---|---|---|---|---|
| Juvenile Fillies | 12:05p | 14 Hands Winery | 1 1/16 miles | 2-year-old fillies | $2 million | Songbird |
| Turf Sprint | 12:45p | | 5 1/2 furlongs (Turf) | 3 yrs+ | $1 million | Mongolian Saturday |
| Filly & Mare Sprint | 1:25p | | 7 furlongs | 3 yrs+ fillies & mares | $1 million | Wavell Avenue |
| Filly & Mare Turf | 2:10p | | 1 3/16 miles (Turf) | Fillies and mares | $2 million | Stephanie's Kitten |
| Sprint | 2:50p | Twin Spires | 6 furlongs | 3 yrs+ | $1.5 million | Runhappy |
| Mile | 3:30p | | 1 mile (Turf) | 3 yrs+ | $2 million | Tepin |
| Juvenile | 4:10p | Sentient Jet | 1 1/16 miles | 2-year-old colts and geldings | $2 million | Nyquist |
| Turf | 4:50p | Longines | 1 1/2 miles (Turf) | 3 yrs+ | $3 million | Found |
| Classic | 5:35p | | 1 1/4 miles | 3 yrs+ | $5 million | American Pharoah |
