= 1941 Kentucky Derby =

Horse race

67th Kentucky Derby
- Kentucky Derby
- Grade I stakes race
- Location: Churchill Downs
- Date: May 3, 1941
- Winning horse: Whirlaway
- Jockey: Eddie Arcaro
- Trainer: Ben A. Jones
- Owner: Calumet Farm
- Surface: Dirt

The 1941 Kentucky Derby was the 67th running of the Kentucky Derby. The race took place on May 3, 1941. Whirlaway's winning time set a Derby record (later broken).

== Full results ==
Finished	Post	Horse	Jockey	Trainer	Owner	Time / behind
1st	4	Whirlaway	Eddie Arcaro	Ben A. Jones	Calumet Farm	2:01 2/5
2nd	2	Staretor	George Woolf	George H. Strate	Hugh S. Nesbitt	
3rd	7	Market Wise	Irving Anderson	George W. Carroll	Louis Tufano	
4th	9	Porter's Cap	Leon Haas	R. Thomas Smith	Charles S. Howard	
5th	5	Little Beans	Gustavo Moore	Rocky Palladino	Mrs. Louise Palladino	
6th	11	Dispose	Carroll Bierman	Max Hirsch	King Ranch	
7th	3	Blue Pair	Basil James	Willie Crump	Vera S. Bragg	
8th	10	Our Boots	Conn McCreary	Steve Judge	Woodvale Farm	
9th	8	Robert Morris	Harry C. Richards	Thomas H. McCreery	J. Frederick Byers	
10th	6	Valdina Paul	Hugh O. Lemmons	John J. Flanigan	Valdina Farms Stable	
11th	1	Swain	Johnny Adams	Bill Winfrey	Cleveland Putnam	

- Winning breeder: Calumet Farm (KY)
