= 1945 Kentucky Derby =

Horse race

71st Kentucky Derby
- Kentucky Derby
- Grade I stakes race
- Location: Churchill Downs
- Date: June 9, 1945
- Winning horse: Hoop Jr.
- Jockey: Eddie Arcaro
- Trainer: Ivan H. Parke
- Owner: Fred W. Hooper
- Surface: Dirt

The 1945 Kentucky Derby was the 71st running of the Kentucky Derby, held on June 9, 1945. It was won by Hoop Jr., ridden by jockey Eddie Arcaro.

Regularly held on the first Saturday of May, the 1945 edition of the Kentucky Derby was initially scheduled for May 5. However, in December 1944, the director of the Office of War Mobilization, James F. Byrnes, requested that all horse racing tracks suspend racing starting in January 1945, "and to refrain from resuming racing at all tracks until war conditions permit." Days after V-E Day, Byrne's successor at the Office of War Mobilization, Fred M. Vinson, lifted the suspension on horse racing in an announcement on May 10. The Kentucky Derby was subsequently scheduled for June 9, with the Preakness Stakes and Belmont Stakes to follow on June 16 and June 23, respectively.

== Full results ==
Finished	Post	Horse	Jockey	Trainer	Owner	Time / behind
1st	2	Hoop Jr.	Eddie Arcaro	Ivan H. Parke	Fred W. Hooper	2:07 0/0
2nd	7	Pot O'Luck	Douglas Dodson	Ben A. Jones	Calumet Farm	
3rd	9	Darby Dieppe	Melvin Calvert	Charles Gentry	Mrs. W. Graham Lewis	
4th	5	Air Sailor	Leon Haas	Alexis G. Wilson	Theodore D. Buhl	
5th	3	Jeep	Arnold Kirkland	Lydell T. Ruff	Cornelius Vanderbilt Whitney	
6th	10	Bymeabond	Fred A. Smith	William B. Stucki	J. Kel Houssels	
7th	12	Sea Swallow	George Woolf	Joseph H. Stotler	Charles S. Howard	
8th	8	Fighting Step	George South	Charles C. Norman	Murlogg Farm	
9th	6	Burning Dream	Albert Snider	James W. Smith	Edward R. Bradley	
10th	1	Alexis	Kenneth Scawthorn	John A. Healey	Christiana Stable	
11th	4	Foreign Agent	Kempton Knott	George E. Lewis	Lookout Stud Farm	
12th	11	Misweet	Arthur Craig	Leo O'Donnel	Arthur Rose	
13th	13	Tiger Rebel	J. Raymond Layton	John M. Goode	Brent & Talbot	
14th	15	Bert G.	Robert Summers	C. P. Rose	Tom L. Graham	
15th	14	Jacobe	Herb Lindberg	Francis J. Scoot	A. R. Wright	
16th	16	Kenilworth Lad	Frederick Weidaman	C. P. Rose	Tom L. Graham	

- Winning breeder: Robert A. Fairbairn (KY)
