= Needles (horse) =

American-bred Thoroughbred racehorse

- Sire: Ponder
- Grandsire: Pensive
- Dam: Noodle Soup
- Damsire: Jack High
- Sex: Stallion
- Foaled: April 29, 1953
- Country: United States
- Colour: Bay
- Breeder: William E. Leach
- Owner: D & H Stable
- Trainer: Hugh L. Fontaine
- Record: 21: 11-3-3
- Earnings: $600,355

Major wins
- Hopeful Stakes (1955); Sapling Stakes (1955); Flamingo Stakes (1956); Florida Derby (1956); Fort Lauderdale Handicap (1957); U.S. Triple Crown series: Kentucky Derby (1956); Belmont Stakes (1956)

Awards
- U.S. Champion 2-Yr-Old Colt (1955); U.S. Champion 3-Yr-Old Colt (1956)

Honours
- Florida Sports Hall of Fame (1974); United States Racing Hall of Fame (2000); Needles Stakes at Calder Race Course; Needles Court in Napa, California
- Last updated on December 9, 2006

Needles (April 29, 1953 – October 15, 1984) was an American Hall of Fame Champion Thoroughbred racehorse. In 1956, he became the first Florida-bred horse to win the Kentucky Derby; that year he also won the Belmont Stakes.

== Background ==
Needles was a bay colt bred and raised in Ocala, Florida. He was the descendant of Blenheim and a son and grandson of Kentucky Derby winners Ponder and Pensive. Needles was a sickly foal who was given his name because of the numerous veterinary injections he was given to overcome broken ribs and pneumonia. Needles' dam Noodle Soup was a descendant of the influential Irish broodmare Golden Harp.

== Racing career ==
Owned by Jack Dudley and Bonnie Heath who raced as the D & H Stable, at age two Needles won six of ten starts, including the prestigious Hopeful Stakes. His performances that year earned him the 1955 championship as two-year-old colt.

Ridden by David Erb, Needles was a crowd favorite for his come-from-behind style, sometimes overcoming a 15-length deficit. The betting favorite, Needles won the 1956 Kentucky Derby by coming from 16th place in a field of 17 to make up 24 lengths and win "going away". His victory marked the first time a Florida-bred horse won America's most prestigious horse race.

In the Preakness Stakes, the next leg of the U.S. Triple Crown races at Pimlico Race Course, Needles finished second to the Calumet Farm colt Fabius, whom he had beaten in the Derby. Needles came back in New York to win the grueling one and a half-mile Belmont Stakes, the final and longest leg of the Triple Crown races. Career Boy finished second and Fabius ran third. Needles earned another championship as three-year-old colt in 1956.

At age four, Needles started three times, finishing 1, 2, and 3. His 1957 racing season ended early following an injury.

== Stud record ==
Needles was sent to stand at stud at owner Bonnie Heath's breeding farm in Marion County, Florida. Needles' success in racing sparked a boom in Florida horse breeding. Among others, it produced notable runners such as Carry Back and Affirmed. In 1974 he was inducted into the Florida Sports Hall Of Fame.

Needles died in 1984 at the age of 31. His heart and hooves are buried in the Garden of Champions at the Ocala Breeders' Sales Company Pavilion. In 2000, he was inducted into the United States National Museum of Racing and Hall of Fame.

== Pedigree ==
Pedigree of Needles (USA) bay horse 1953
Sire Ponder (USA) 1946	Pensive (USA); 1941	Hyperion (GB)	Gainsborough
Sire Ponder (USA) 1946	Pensive (USA); 1941	Hyperion (GB)	Selene
Sire Ponder (USA) 1946	Pensive (USA); 1941	Penicuik (GB)	Buchan
Sire Ponder (USA) 1946	Pensive (USA); 1941	Penicuik (GB)	Pennycomequick
Sire Ponder (USA) 1946	Miss Rushin (USA); 1942	Blenheim (GB)	Blandford
Sire Ponder (USA) 1946	Miss Rushin (USA); 1942	Blenheim (GB)	Malva
Sire Ponder (USA) 1946	Miss Rushin (USA); 1942	Lady Erne	Sir Gallahad (FR)
Sire Ponder (USA) 1946	Miss Rushin (USA); 1942	Lady Erne	Erne (IRE)
Dam Noodle Soup (USA) 1944	Jack High (USA); 1926	John P Grier	Whisk Broom
Dam Noodle Soup (USA) 1944	Jack High (USA); 1926	John P Grier	Wonder
Dam Noodle Soup (USA) 1944	Jack High (USA); 1926	Priscilla	Star Shoot (GB)
Dam Noodle Soup (USA) 1944	Jack High (USA); 1926	Priscilla	Yankee Sister
Dam Noodle Soup (USA) 1944	Supromene (USA); 1938	Supremus	Ultimus
Dam Noodle Soup (USA) 1944	Supromene (USA); 1938	Supremus	Mandy Hamilton (GB)
Dam Noodle Soup (USA) 1944	Supromene (USA); 1938	Melpomene (GB)	Son-in-Law
Dam Noodle Soup (USA) 1944	Supromene (USA); 1938	Melpomene (GB)	Golden Harp (IRE) (family 5-e)

== See also ==
- List of racehorses
