= Quashed (racehorse) =

British Thoroughbred racehorse

- Sire: Obliterate
- Grandsire: Tracery
- Dam: Verdict
- Damsire: Shogun
- Sex: Filly
- Foaled: 1932
- Country: Great Britain
- Colour: Bay
- Owner: Lord Stanley
- Earnings: £19,096

Major wins
- Epsom Oaks (1935); Jockey Club Cup (1935, 1936); Great Metropolitan Handicap (1936); Ormonde Stakes (1936); Ascot Gold Cup (1936)
- Last updated on May 5, 2009

Quashed (foaled 1932) was a British-bred and British-trained racehorse, winner of The Oaks in 1935.

For many years, the Verdict family was not accepted into the British Stud Book because Quashed's dam was effectively a half-bred and it was not until the 1960s era of the July Cup winner Lucasland that the family's merit persuaded the authorities to review their opinion about its eligibility. But though Quashed may not have been granted a presence in the GSB, she could not be prevented from racing and by the time she retired at the end of 1937 she had won ten races worth £19,096. Chief among these was the Ascot Gold Cup in 1936, when she beat the American horse Omaha by a short head after a tremendous battle. She also won The Oaks - having started at 33-1 - the Ormonde Stakes and Jockey Club Cup.

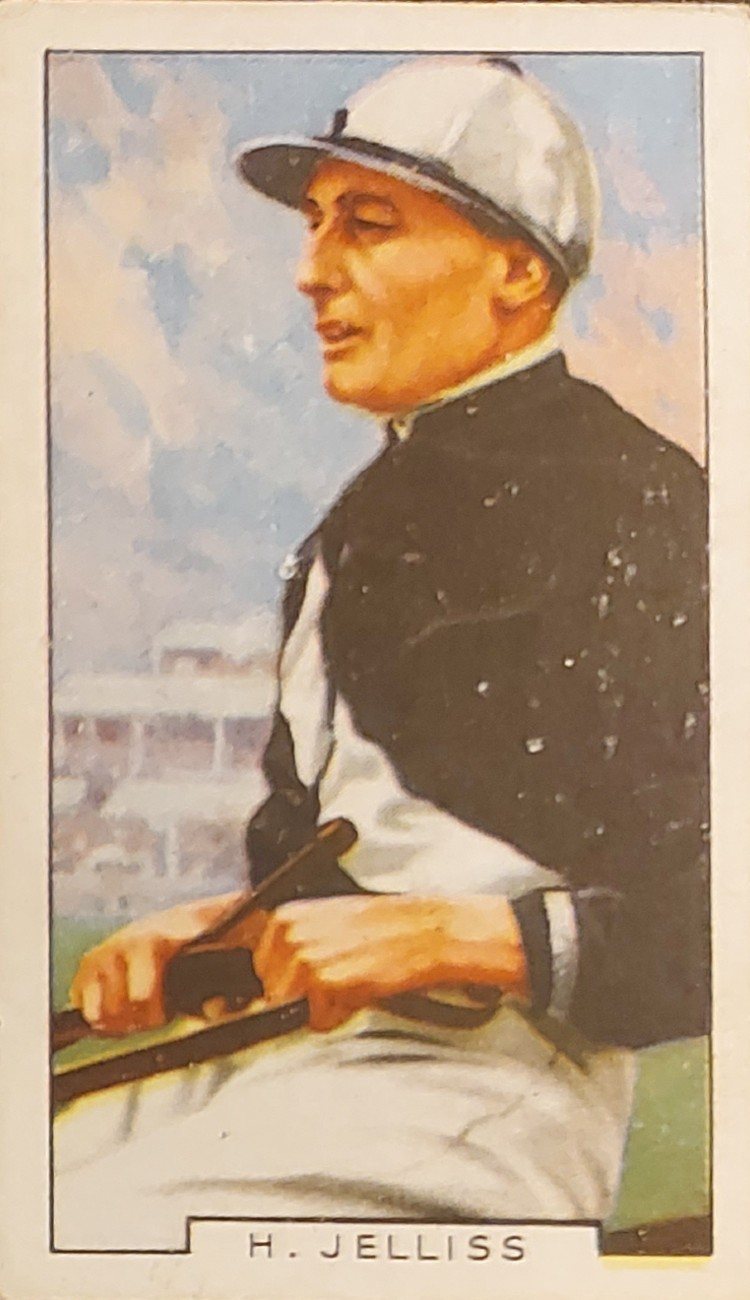
Henri Jelliss in the silks of Lord Stanley, 1936 Gallaher's cigarette card.
