= Hoop Jr. =

American-bred Thoroughbred racehorse

- Sire: Sir Gallahad
- Grandsire: Teddy
- Dam: One Hour
- Damsire: Snob
- Sex: Stallion
- Foaled: March 15, 1942
- Country: United States
- Colour: Bay
- Breeder: Robert A. Fairbairn
- Owner: Fred W. Hooper
- Trainer: Ivan H. Parke
- Record: 9: 4–4-0
- Earnings: $99,290

Major wins
- Wood Memorial Stakes (1945); Kentucky Derby (1945)
- Last updated on November 3, 2008

Hoop Jr. (March 15, 1942 – November 19, 1964) was an American Thoroughbred racehorse best known for winning the 1945 Kentucky Derby.

== Background ==
Hoop Jr. was a bay horse sired by the French-bred stallion Sir Gallahad, a full brother to Bull Dog, who sired Bull Lea. He was out of the American stakes winning mare One Hour, a daughter of the French bred Snob, who had been purchased for the third highest amount ever paid for a horse imported into the United States for racing purposes.

Hoop Jr. was the first Thoroughbred horse Fred W. Hooper, an Alabama and Florida building contractor, ever bought. He paid $10,000 for the colt at the Keeneland Sales and named him after his youngest son, Fred Jr. Hooper was quoted many years later saying, "I liked the way he looked, the way he walked, everything, and I said, 'I'm going to own you.'"

== Racing career ==
At the age of two, Hoop Jr. started in five modest stakes events. He won twice and placed three times (the Bowie Kindergarten Stakes, the Pimlico Nursery Stakes, and the Aberdeen Stakes), then developed osselets, a condition that mostly afflicts young horses. Hooper had his "ankles fired" (heat applied), then turned him out at his Alabama Farm to save him for the following year's Kentucky Derby. Most considered this ambition overly optimistic. But Hooper, who raced Susan's Girl, Precisionist, and Copelan, said, "He was the best racehorse I ever owned. He could run as far as races are laid out and as fast as anybody."

Trained by Ivan Parke, in his three-year-old debut, Hoop Jr. came in fourth, the only time in his career when more than one rival finished before him. He was beaten by the great filly Gallorette as well. In 1945, the Wood Memorial was run in two divisions. In the first, Gallorette came in second to Jeep. In the second division, Hoop Jr. won, running faster than both Gallorette and Jeep in their division.

In the 1945 Kentucky Derby, Eddie Arcaro rode Hoop Jr. over a muddy track against a field of 15. He took the lead going past the grandstand the first time and kept increasing it until he won by six lengths against Pot o' Luck and Darby Dieppe. Hooper had won the Kentucky Derby with his first race horse. He said, "I never thought I'd make it this quick."

One week later, Hoop Jr. ran in the Preakness Stakes. Running in third place (although for a time he was pinched in along the rail), he made his move only to suddenly give way. The race was won by Polynesian, and Hoop Jr. came in second with a bowed tendon.

== Stud record ==
His racing career over, he entered stud in 1946. He died and was buried at Hooper Farm in Ocala, Florida, in 1964. Owner Fred W. Hooper died in August 2000, aged 102.

== Pedigree ==
Pedigree of Hoop, Jr. bay stallion, 1942
Sire Sir Gallahad (FR) 1920	Teddy (FR); 1913	Ajax	Flying Fox
Sire Sir Gallahad (FR) 1920	Teddy (FR); 1913	Ajax	Amie
Sire Sir Gallahad (FR) 1920	Teddy (FR); 1913	Rondeau	Bay Ronald
Sire Sir Gallahad (FR) 1920	Teddy (FR); 1913	Rondeau	Doremi
Sire Sir Gallahad (FR) 1920	Plucky Liege (GB); 1912	Spearmint	Carbine
Sire Sir Gallahad (FR) 1920	Plucky Liege (GB); 1912	Spearmint	Maid of the Mint
Sire Sir Gallahad (FR) 1920	Plucky Liege (GB); 1912	Concertina	St. Simon
Sire Sir Gallahad (FR) 1920	Plucky Liege (GB); 1912	Concertina	Comic Song
Dam One Hour (USA) 1925	Snob (FR); 1919	Prestige	Le Pompon
Dam One Hour (USA) 1925	Snob (FR); 1919	Prestige	Orgueilleuse
Dam One Hour (USA) 1925	Snob (FR); 1919	May Dora	Isidor
Dam One Hour (USA) 1925	Snob (FR); 1919	May Dora	Mai
Dam One Hour (USA) 1925	Daylight Saving (USA); 1918	Star Shoot	Isinglass
Dam One Hour (USA) 1925	Daylight Saving (USA); 1918	Star Shoot	Astrology
Dam One Hour (USA) 1925	Daylight Saving (USA); 1918	Tea Enough	Ogden
Dam One Hour (USA) 1925	Daylight Saving (USA); 1918	Tea Enough	Tea's Over (Family 9)
