= Our Boots =

American-bred Thoroughbred racehorse

- Sire: Bull Dog
- Grandsire: Teddy
- Dam: Maid of Arches
- Damsire: Warden of the Marches
- Sex: Stallion
- Foaled: 1938
- Country: United States
- Colour: Bay
- Breeder: Charles B. Shaffer
- Owner: Woodvale Farm
- Trainer: Steve Judge
- Record: 32: 9-3-7
- Earnings: US$126,152

Major wins
- Futurity Trial (1940); Belmont Futurity Stakes (1940); Blue Grass Stakes (1941); Yankee Handicap (1941)

Awards
- DRF American Champion Two-Year-Old Colt (1940)

Our Boots (foaled 1938) was an American Champion Thoroughbred racehorse. He won a Daily Racing Form poll to be voted the 1940 American Champion Two-Year-Old Colt. The rival Turf & Sports Digest poll was topped by Whirlaway. He was sired by Bull Dog, the 1943 Leading sire in North America, and was out of the English-born mare Maid of Arches.

Our Boots was owned and raced by the Woodvale Farm of Royce G. Martin, who bought him at the Saratoga Sales for $3,500. He was trained by Steve Judge. The colt's most important wins of his two-year-old championship season came in the Futurity Trial and the Futurity Stakes at Belmont Park, in which he defeated future U.S. Triple Crown winner and Hall of Fame inductee Whirlaway.

A winterbook favorite for the Kentucky Derby, Our Boots won the Blue Grass Stakes, then finished eighth in the Derby and third in the Preakness Stakes.

As a sire, Our Boots produced some offspring that met with modest racing success.
