= Eddie Arcaro =

American jockey (1916–1997)

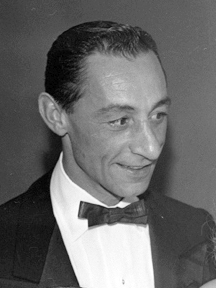
- Arcaro in 1957

Personal information
- Born: February 19, 1916 Cincinnati, Ohio, United States
- Died: November 14, 1997 (aged 81) Miami, Florida, United States
- Resting place: Our Lady of Mercy Catholic Cemetery, Miami, Florida, United States
- Occupation: Jockey

Horse racing career
- Sport: Horse racing
- Career wins: 4,779

Major racing wins
- Jockey Club Gold Cup (10); Juvenile Stakes (7); National Stallion Stakes (7); Wood Memorial Stakes (9); Suburban Handicap (8); Withers Stakes (6); Kentucky Oaks (4) U.S. Triple Crown series: Kentucky Derby (5) (1938, 1941, 1945, 1948, 1952); Preakness Stakes (6) (1941, 1948, 1950, 1951, 1955, 1957); Belmont Stakes (6) (1941, 1942, 1945, 1948, 1952, 1955)

Racing awards
- United States Triple Crown (1941, 1948); United States Champion Jockey by earnings (1940, 1942, 1948, 1950, 1952, 1958); George Woolf Memorial Jockey Award (1953); Big Sport of Turfdom Award (1974)

Honours
- United States Racing Hall of Fame (1958); Fair Grounds Racing Hall of Fame (1971); Eddie Arcaro Stakes at Hialeah Park

Significant horses
- Whirlaway, Citation, Ponder, Hoop Jr., Challedon, Kelso, Nashua, Mark-Ye-Well, Hill Prince, Bold Ruler, Sword Dancer, Real Delight
- Updated on January 16, 2007

George Edward Arcaro (February 19, 1916 – November 14, 1997) was an American Thoroughbred horse racing Hall of Fame jockey who won more American classic races than any other jockey in history and is the only rider to have won the U.S. Triple Crown twice. He is widely regarded as one of the greatest jockeys in the history of American Thoroughbred horse racing. Arcaro was born in Cincinnati, Ohio, the son of an impoverished taxi driver. His parents, Pasquale and Josephine, were Italian immigrants and his father held a number of jobs, including taxi driver and operator of an illegal liquor enterprise during Prohibition. Arcaro was born prematurely, and weighed just three pounds at birth; because of this, he was smaller than his classmates and was rejected when he tried out for a spot on a baseball team. His full height would reach just five-foot, two inches. Eventually nicknamed "Banana Nose" by his confreres, Arcaro won his first race in 1932 at the Agua Caliente racetrack in Tijuana, Mexico; he was 16 years old. In 1934, the inaugural year of Narragansett Park, Arcaro was a comparative unknown who rode many of his early career races at 'Gansett. Arcaro retired from racing in 1962

== American classic races ==
Arcaro won his first Kentucky Derby in 1938 aboard Lawrin. He is tied with Bill Hartack for most Derby wins with five, and has the most wins in the Preakness and the Belmont Stakes with six. He won the U.S. Triple Crown in 1941 on Whirlaway and again in 1948 on Citation. His other Kentucky Derby wins were Hoop Jr. (1945) and Hill Gail (1952). Arcaro also won the most triple crown races at 17 with the next highest total at only 11.

== Major stakes wins ==
Arcaro also won the Suburban Handicap eight times, the Wood Memorial Stakes nine times and the Jockey Club Gold Cup ten times.

In international competition, at old Woodbine Racetrack in Toronto, Arcaro won the 1953 Queen's Plate (Canada's most prestigious race); at Laurel Park Racecourse in Laurel, Maryland, he won the 1954 Washington, D.C. International against the best horses and riders from Europe.

In 1953 Arcaro was voted the George Woolf Memorial Jockey Award, and in 1958 he was inducted into the National Museum of Racing and Hall of Fame in Saratoga Springs, New York.

Active in jockey affairs, Arcaro was a driving force behind the creation of the Jockeys' Guild. He retired in 1962, due to severe bursitis in his arm. During his career Arcaro rode in 24,092 races and won 4,779, with record setting earnings of $30,039,543. After working as a television commentator on racing for CBS and ABC, he was a public relations officer for the Golden Nugget Casino in Las Vegas before retiring to Miami, Florida. He also worked as a spokesman for the Buick Motor Division of General Motors, for which he voiced the well-known phrase "If you price a Buick, you'll buy a Buick." For many years, he was the proprietor of a popular Italian restaurant in Beverly Hills.

== Death and legacy ==
According to his second wife Vera, Arcaro suffered pancreatic cancer in his later years. He died at his Miami home in 1997 leaving behind a legacy of Ruth, Carolyn, and Bobby Arcaro. His body was cremated and his ashes were interred in the columbarium at Our Lady of Mercy Catholic Cemetery in Miami. Today, he remains one of the best-known jockeys in the history of horse racing, called "the Master" for his riding skills, good sense of pace and the ability to switch his whip from one hand to the other with ease during a race.

== Triple Crown race record ==
Year	Kentucky Derby	Finish	Preakness	Finish	Belmont	Finish
1935	Nellie Flag ‡	4th	Nellie Flag ‡	7th	-	-
1938	**Lawrin**	**1st**	-	-	-	-
1938	-	-	-	-	Gentle Savage	6th
1939	-	-	-	-	Hash	5th
1941	**Whirlaway †**	**1st**	**Whirlaway †**	**1st**	**Whirlaway †**	**1st**
1942	Devil Diver	6th	Devil Diver	8th	-	-
1942	-	-	-	-	**Shut Out**	**1st**
1944	Stir Up	3rd	Stir Up	3rd	-	-
1944	-	-	-	-	Who Goes There	4th
1945	**Hoop Jr.**	**1st**	-	-	-	-
1945	-	-	-	-	**Pavot**	**1st**
1946	Lord Boswell	4th	-	-	-	-
1946	-	-	Hampden	3rd	Hampden	4th
1947	Phalanx	2nd	Phalanx	3rd	-	-
1947	-	-	-	-	Khyber Pass	8th
1948	**Citation †**	**1st**	**Citation †**	**1st**	**Citation †**	**1st**
1949	Olympia	6th	-	-	-	-
1949	-	-	Palestinian	2nd	Palestinian	3rd
1950	Hill Prince	2nd	**Hill Prince**	**1st**	Hill Prince	7th
1951	Battle Morn	6th	-	-	-	-
1951	-	-	**Bold**	**1st**	-	-
1951	-	-	-	-	Battlefield	2nd
1952	**Hill Gail**	**1st**	-	-	-	-
1952	-	-	One Count	3rd	**One Count**	**1st**
1953	Correspondent	5th	-	-	-	-
1953	-	-	Jamie K.	2nd	Jamie K.	2nd
1954	Goyamo	4th	-	-	-	-
1954	-	-	-	-	Correlation	5th
1955	Nashua	2nd	**Nashua**	**1st**	**Nashua**	**1st**
1956	Head Man	8th	-	-	-	-
1956	-	-	-	-	Jazz Age	7th
1957	Bold Ruler	4th	**Bold Ruler**	**1st**	Bold Ruler	3rd
1958	Jewel's Reward	4th	-	-	-	-
1958	-	-	-	-	Nasco	4th
1959	First Landing	3rd	First Landing	9th	-	-
1959	-	-	-	-	Black Hills	9th
1960	-	-	-	-	Venetian Way	2nd
1961	Sherluck	5th	-	-	-	-

† - Won the Triple Crown

‡ - Filly

Kentucky Derby: 21-5-3-2

Preakness: 15-6-2-4

Belmont: 21-6-3-2

Preceded by Sterling Young	Jockeys' Guild president 1949–1962	Succeeded by Sam Boulmetis
