= Ormonde Stakes =

Flat horse race in Britain

- Class: Group 3
- Location: Chester Racecourse; Chester, England
- Inaugurated: 1936
- Race type: Flat / Thoroughbred
- Sponsor: Ladbrokes
- Website: Chester

Race information
- Distance: 1m 5f 84y (2,692m)
- Surface: Turf
- Track: Left-handed
- Qualification: Four-years-old and up
- Weight: 9 st 2 lb Allowances; 3 lb for fillies and mares Penalties; 7 lb for Group 1 winners * 5 lb for Group 2 winners * 3 lb for Group 3 winners * * since 31 August last year
- Purse: £140,000 (2024); 1st: £79,394

Ormonde Stakes
2026
Jan Brueghel	Mount Atlas	Illinois

Previous years
2025
Illinois	Al Qareem	Absurde
2024
Point Lonsdale	Arrest	Alsakib
2023
Hamish	Lone Eagle	Changingoftheguard
2022
Hamish	Thunderous	Alounak
2021
Japan	Trueshan	Sonnyboyliston

2020-2011
2019
Morando	Kew Gardens	Magic Circle
2018
Idaho	Danehill Kodiac	Elidor
2017
Western Hymn	Us Army Ranger	Duretto
2016
Dartmouth	Wicklow Brave	Elidor
2015
Clever Cookie	Tac De Boistron	Deuce Again
2014
Brown Panther	Hillstar	Banoffee
2013
Mount Athos	Mad Moose	Communicator
2012
Memphis Tennessee	Vivacious Vivienne	Calico Cat
2011
St Nicholas Abbey	Allied Powers	Harris Tweed

2010-2001
2010
Harbinger	Age Of Aquarius	Munsef
2009
Buccellati	Scintillo	Frozen Fire
2008
Macarthur	Supersonic Dave	Carte Diamond
2007
Ask	Scorpion	Steppe Dancer
2006
The Whistling Teal	Orcadian	Arbella
2005
Day Flight	Shabernak	Acropolis
2004
Systematic	The Whistling Teal	Compton Bolter
2003
Asian Heights	Compton Bolter	Razkalla
2002
St Expedit	Sagittarius	Ovambo
2001
St Expedit	Pairumani Star	Bay Of Islands

2000-1991
2000
Daliapour	Life Is Life	Danish Rhapsody
1999
Sadian	Secret Saver	Rokeby Bowl
1998
Stretarez	Palio Sky	Memorise
1997
Royal Court	Royal Court	Further Flight
1996
Oscar Schindler	Election Day	Minds Music
1995
Zilzal Zamaan	Shambo	Broadway Flyer
1994
Shambo	Shrewd Idea	League Leader
1993
Shambo	Allegan	Zinaad
1992
Saddlers' Hall	Arcadian Heights	Parting Moment
1991
Per Quod	Warm Feeling	Indian Queen

1990-1988
1990
Braashee	Michelozzo	Albadr
1989
Mountain Kingdom	Lazaz	West China
1988
Mr Pintips	Spruce Baby	Sir Harry Lewis

The Ormonde Stakes is a Group 3 flat horse race in Great Britain open to horses aged four years or older. It is run over a distance of 1 mile, 5 furlongs and 84 yards (2,692 metres) at Chester in May.

== History ==
The event is named after Ormonde, a famous racehorse foaled at Eaton Hall in Cheshire. The original version was a 5-furlong race for two-year-olds.

The present Ormonde Stakes was established in 1936. It was initially open to horses aged three or older, and contested over 1 mile, 5 furlongs and 75 yards. The first running was won by Quashed.

The race was confined to three-year-olds and cut to 1 mile, 2 furlongs and 10 yards in 1955. Its previous distance was restored in 1958, and from this point it was restricted to older horses. It was extended by several yards in 1970.

The Ormonde Stakes can serve as a trial for the Coronation Cup. The last horse to win both races in the same year was St Nicholas Abbey in 2011.

== Records ==
Most successful horse (2 wins):

- Sovrango – 1962, 1963
- Shambo – 1993, 1994
- St Expedit – 2001, 2002
- Hamish - 2022, 2023

Leading jockey (8 wins):

- Ryan Moore - Harbinger (2010), St Nicholas Abbey (2011), Dartmouth (2016), Idaho (2018), Japan (2021), Point Lonsdale (2024), Illinois (2025), Jan Brueghel (2026)

Leading trainer (8 wins):

- Aidan O'Brien - Macarthur (2008), Sir Nicholas Abbey (2011), Memphis Tennessee (2012), Idaho (2018), Japan (2021), Point Lonsdale (2024), Illinois (2025), Jan Brueghel (2026)

== Winners ==
Year	Winner	Age	Jockey	Trainer	Time
1936	Quashed	4	Richard Perryman	Colledge Leader	2:54.40
1937	Young England	4	Billy Nevett	Matthew Peacock	2:57.00
1938	Senor	4	Jackie Crouch	Richard Dawson	2:56.00
1939	Tricameron	3	Arthur Tucker	Lucien Robert	2:55.20
	no race 1940–45
1946	High Stakes	4	Cliff Richards	Joseph Lawson	2:58.20
1947	Turkish Tune	4	William Wells	Darby Rogers	3:02.80
1948	Goyama	5	Charlie Elliott	Charles Semblat	3:12.20
1949	Alycidon	4	Doug Smith	Walter Earl	3:07.00
1950	Olein's Grace	4	Charlie Elliott	Vincent O'Brien	3:11.00
1951	Cagire II	4	Charlie Elliott	Evan Williams	3:14.20
1952	Tulyar	3	Doug Smith	Marcus Marsh	3:29.60
1953	Wyandank	4	Manny Mercer	Joseph Lawson	3:04.40
1954	Stem King	4	Doug Smith	Richard Perryman	3:11.80
1955	North Cone	3	Eph Smith	Geoffrey Barling	2:14.40
1956	Stephanotis	3	Ken Gethin	Harvey Leader	2:10.20
1957	Hindu Festival	3	Tommy Gosling	Paddy Prendergast	2:11.40
1958	Doutelle	4	Harry Carr	Cecil Boyd-Rochfort	2:53.20
1959	Primera	5	Lester Piggott	Noel Murless	2:55.00
1960	Light Horseman	4	Ron Hutchinson	Paddy Prendergast	3:00.00
1961	Alcaeus	4	Scobie Breasley	Paddy Prendergast	3:09.80
1962	Sovrango	4	Bill Williamson	Harry Wragg	3:05.60
1963	Sovrango	5	Bill Williamson	Harry Wragg	2:58.20
1964	Arctic Vale	5	Lester Piggott	Paddy Prendergast	3:10.20
1965	Indiana	4	Jimmy Lindley	Jack Watts	3:10.40
1966	Biomydrin	4	Lester Piggott	Noel Murless	3:06.00
1967	David Jack	4	Lester Piggott	Ted Lambton	3:01.60
1968	Hopeful Venture	4	Sandy Barclay	Noel Murless	3:09.40
1969	Abandoned due to waterlogging
1970	Blakeney	4	Ernie Johnson	Arthur Budgett	2:55.80
1971	Quayside	4	Lester Piggott	Denys Smith	2:52.00
1972	Selhurst	4	Geoff Lewis	Noel Murless	2:58.96
1973	Ormindo	4	Brian Taylor	Harry Wragg	3:04.13
1974	Crazy Rhythm	6	Geoff Lewis	Staff Ingham	2:58.96
1975	Rouser	4	Geoff Lewis	Bruce Hobbs	3:04.66
1976	Zimbalon	4	Joe Mercer	Dick Hern	3:04.11
1977	Oats	4	Pat Eddery	Peter Walwyn	2:58.28
1978	Crow	5	Pat Eddery	Peter Walwyn	2:54.29
1979	Remainder Man	4	Joe Mercer	Reg Hollinshead	3:10.80
1980	Niniski	4	Willie Carson	Dick Hern	2:49.63
1981	Pelerin	4	Brian Taylor	Harry Wragg	2:58.95
1982	Six Mile Bottom	4	Steve Cauthen	Harry Wragg	2:50.88
1983	Abandoned due to waterlogging
1984	Teenoso	4	Pat Eddery	Geoff Wragg	2:51.92
1985	Seismic Wave	4	Brent Thomson	Barry Hills	2:54.59
1986	Brunico	4	Brent Thomson	Rod Simpson	3:15.38
1987	Rakaposhi King	5	Steve Cauthen	Henry Cecil	2:45.43
1988	Mr Pintips	4	Willie Carson	William Hastings-Bass	3:20.49
1989	Mountain Kingdom	5	Steve Cauthen	Clive Brittain	2:55.96
1990	Braashee	4	Michael Roberts	Alec Stewart	2:58.17
1991	Per Quod	6	Bruce Raymond	Ben Hanbury	2:55.68
1992	Saddlers' Hall	4	Pat Eddery	Michael Stoute	2:48.38
1993	Shambo	6	Michael Roberts	Clive Brittain	2:50.45
1994	Shambo	7	Michael Roberts	Clive Brittain	2:51.74
1995	Zilzal Zamaan	4	Walter Swinburn	Michael Stoute	2:52.47
1996	Oscar Schindler	4	Michael Kinane	Kevin Prendergast	2:55.39
1997	Royal Court	4	John Reid	Peter Chapple-Hyam	3:15.85
1998	Stretarez	5	Kevin Darley	Venetia Williams	2:50.64
1999	Sadian	4	Pat Eddery	John Dunlop	2:52.26
2000	Daliapour	4	Kieren Fallon	Sir Michael Stoute	2:50.16
2001	St Expedit	4	Darryll Holland	Geoff Wragg	2:49.47
2002	St Expedit	5	Darryll Holland	Geoff Wragg	2:47.40
2003	Asian Heights	5	Darryll Holland	Geoff Wragg	2:52.96
2004	Systematic	5	Kevin Darley	Mark Johnston	2:56.34
2005	Day Flight	4	Richard Hughes	John Gosden	2:59.70
2006	The Whistling Teal	10	Steve Drowne	Geoff Wragg	3:00.71
2007	Ask	4	Kerrin McEvoy	Sir Michael Stoute	2:52.33
2008	Macarthur	4	Johnny Murtagh	Aidan O'Brien	2:53.20
2009	Buccellati	5	William Buick	Andrew Balding	3:45.91
2010	Harbinger	4	Ryan Moore	Sir Michael Stoute	2:56.73
2011	St Nicholas Abbey	4	Ryan Moore	Aidan O'Brien	2:52.27
2012	Memphis Tennessee	4	Joseph O'Brien	Aidan O'Brien	3:08.73
2013	Mount Athos	6	Jamie Spencer	Luca Cumani	2:56.13
2014	Brown Panther	6	Richard Kingscote	Tom Dascombe	3:05.96
2015	Clever Cookie	7	Graham Lee	Peter Niven	3:03.15
2016	Dartmouth	4	Ryan Moore	Sir Michael Stoute	2:58.70
2017	Western Hymn	6	Frankie Dettori	John Gosden	2:52.69
2018	Idaho	5	Ryan Moore	Aidan O'Brien	2:53.27
2019	Morando	6	Silvestre de Sousa	Andrew Balding	3:00.66
	no race 2020 (Note: The 2020 running was cancelled because of the COVID-19 pandemic in the United Kingdom)
2021	Japan	5	Ryan Moore	Aidan O'Brien	2:58.01
2022	Hamish	6	Tom Marquand	William Haggas	2:55.99
2023	Hamish	7	Tom Marquand	William Haggas	3:06.02
2024	Point Lonsdale	5	Ryan Moore	Aidan O'Brien	2:49.17
2025	Illinois	4	Ryan Moore	Aidan O'Brien	2:55.74
2026	Jan Brueghel	5	Ryan Moore	Aidan O'Brien	2:48.26

== See also ==
- Horse racing in Great Britain
- List of British flat horse races
