= Winkipop =

British-bred Thoroughbred racehorse

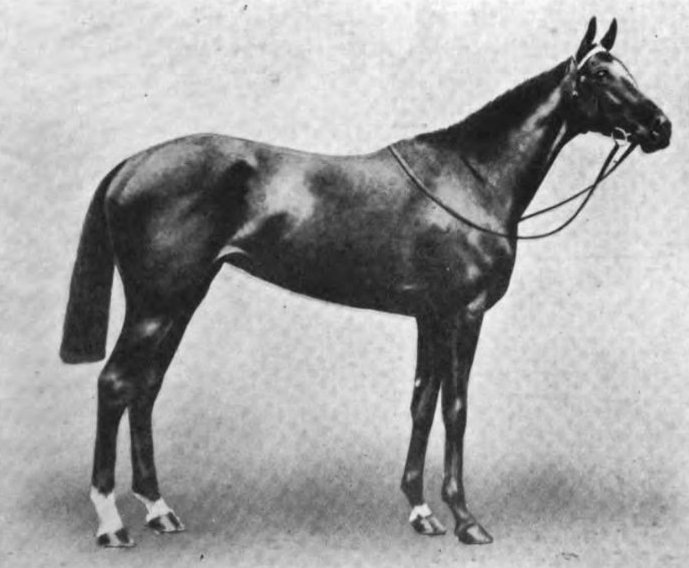
- Winkipop as photographed by W.A. Rouch in 1910.
- Sire: William the Third
- Grandsire: St. Simon
- Dam: Conjure
- Damsire: Juggler
- Sex: Mare
- Foaled: 1907
- Country: United Kingdom
- Colour: Bay
- Breeder: Waldorf Astor
- Owner: Waldorf Astor
- Trainer: William Waugh

Major wins
- 1,000 Guineas Stakes (1910); Yorkshire Oaks (1910); Coronation Stakes (1910); Sussex Stakes (1910); Nassau Stakes (1910)

Winkipop (1907–1931) was a British Thoroughbred racehorse that won the 1910 1,000 Guineas Stakes and Coronation Stakes. She raced briefly at age four and was retired from racing in 1911. As a broodmare, she produced the good racers Plymstock and Blink before she was exported to the United States in 1927. Winkipop died in 1931 at the Mereworth Stud near Lexington, Kentucky.

== Background ==
Winkipop was foaled in 1907 at the Cliveden Stud, a Thoroughbred breeding farm owned by Waldorf Astor at his family's estate near Taplow in Buckinghamshire. Winkipop was sired by William the Third, a good racehorse and sire that was second to Volodyovski in the 1901 Derby and won the 1902 Ascot Gold Cup. Lord Astor bought her dam, Conjure, for £100 when he was a student at Oxford as a potential producer of steeplechase and hunt horses. The mare eventually became an integral part of his Cliveden Stud, producing many top-class racers. Full-siblings to Winkipop include the filly Third Trick and the stallion Winkie. Winkie was not a successful racehorse and was exported to New Zealand as a breeding stallion, where he sired the mare Entreaty, the dam of the multiple stakes winner, Phar Lap.

The Winkipops reef at popular surfing location Bells Beach in Victoria, Australia was named after the horse.

== Racing career ==
Winkipop was first trained by William Waugh at Kingsclere and then by Alec Taylor, Jr. at Manton, Wiltshire. Winkipop won eight races and earned £11,439 during the 1910 season.

=== 1909: two-year-old season ===
In the first start of her racing career, Winkipop was fifth in the Foal Plate at Lingfield Park on 10 July, running against the seasoned racehorses Yellow Slave and Greenback. She started three months later at Newmarket in the Triennial Produce Stakes and finished second to the filly Santa Fina. A few days later, she finished second to an unnamed colt by Broomstick in the six-furlong Alington Plate. In November, Winkipop won the Theale Maiden Plate by three lengths over the colts Catrall and Pentelicus.

=== 1910: three-year-old season ===
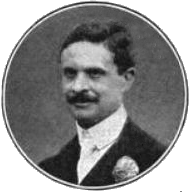
Waldorf Astor bred and owned Winkipop.

In April, Winkipop was second to Sir Jardine's filly Sanctuary in the Newmarket Biennial Stakes. A few weeks later, Winkipop contested for the 1,000 Guineas Stakes against a field of 13 horses. The future Epsom Oaks winner Rosedrop and her stable companion, Maid of Corinth, also ran. Maid of Corinth was not expected to run well due to her poor condition the previous winter. Winkipop and Maid of Corinth remained side by side for most of the race, but despite surprising the crowd with her new-found stamina, the filly could not overtake Winkipop and lost by one and a half lengths. Rosedrop was soundly beaten in the running. In June at Epsom, Winkipop finished sixth in the Oaks. She had maintained a sizable lead in the race until the Tattenham Corner turn when she suddenly slowed down, leading the crowd to believe that she had been struck or "bumped" by another runner. She never regained her position and finished many lengths behind Rosedrop.

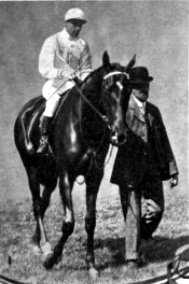
Winkipop at the Oaks.

At Ascot in June, Winkipop won the Coronation Stakes while carrying seven more pounds than the nine other contenders as a penalty for winning the 1,000 Guineas. She was not challenged by the second-place finisher Thalia, winning by a margin of three lengths. She was second in the Royal Stakes held at Newbury a few weeks later, losing by three quarters of a length to Lord Villiers' colt Greenback with the future stallion Willonyx third. In the Nassau Stakes at Goodwood in July, Winkipop faced off against Mr. Nelke's filly Yellow Slave over a mile and a quarter distance. Yellow Slave was noted by the crowd to be sweating profusely before the race and was never a contender in the race, fading fast and losing by five lengths to Winkipop who never broke into a gallop. Her next engagement for the Durham County Produce Plate at Stockton was "an affair that [could] scarcely be called a race" where Winkipop won by two lengths and conceded 24 pounds to her opponents. After winning the Yorkshire Oaks Winkipop finished fifth in the St. Leger Stakes. She won the Triennial Produce Stakes at Newmarket and the Royal Stakes.

She trained on as a four-year-old in 1911, but developed a persistent cough early in the season. She "broke a blood vessel" while participating in the Royal Hunt Cup in July and was retired from racing.

== Breeding career ==
Winkipop was retired to the Cliveden Stud. Her most notable offspring include the mare Plymstock who produced the 1929 Oaks winner Pennycomequick by Hurry On and the colt Blink which won the Princess of Wales's Stakes and was second in the Derby. After foaling Plymstock, Winkipop was repeatedly barren over the subsequent breeding seasons. Due to her infertility, an operation on her ovaries was performed in an attempt to help her conceive. The operation was unsuccessful and after being barren for nine years, Winkipop was sold to Walter Salmon and exported to the United States in 1927. Salmon had made his fortune in the New York real estate market and leased a 600-acre farm called the Mereworth Stud in Lexington, Kentucky. In 1929, Winkipop produced a colt named Swincraft to the cover of Swinburne. Swincraft was the last foal Winkipop produced and was her only offspring born in the United States. Winkipop died in 1931 at the Mereworth Stud.

== Pedigree ==
Pedigree of Winkipop (GB), Bay Mare, 1907
Sire William the Third (GB) Bay, 1898	St. Simon; 1881	Galopin	Vedette
Sire William the Third (GB) Bay, 1898	St. Simon; 1881	Galopin	Flying Duchess
Sire William the Third (GB) Bay, 1898	St. Simon; 1881	St. Angela	King Tom
Sire William the Third (GB) Bay, 1898	St. Simon; 1881	St. Angela	Adeline
Sire William the Third (GB) Bay, 1898	Gravity; 1884	Wisdom	Blinkhoolie
Sire William the Third (GB) Bay, 1898	Gravity; 1884	Wisdom	Aline
Sire William the Third (GB) Bay, 1898	Gravity; 1884	Enigma	The Rake
Sire William the Third (GB) Bay, 1898	Gravity; 1884	Enigma	The Sphnx
Dam Conjure (GB) Brown, 1895	Juggler; 1885	Touchet	Lord Lyon
Dam Conjure (GB) Brown, 1895	Juggler; 1885	Touchet	Lady Audley
Dam Conjure (GB) Brown, 1895	Juggler; 1885	Enchantress	Scottish Chief
Dam Conjure (GB) Brown, 1895	Juggler; 1885	Enchantress	Lady Love
Dam Conjure (GB) Brown, 1895	Connie; 1884	Pero Gomez	Beadsman
Dam Conjure (GB) Brown, 1895	Connie; 1884	Pero Gomez	Salamanca
Dam Conjure (GB) Brown, 1895	Connie; 1884	Hilarity	King Tom
Dam Conjure (GB) Brown, 1895	Connie; 1884	Hilarity	Nightingale (Family 1-p)
