= Pennycomequick =

Suburb of Plymouth, Devon, England

Coordinates: 50.378056°N 4.146944°W

- Location within Devon
- Unitary authority: Plymouth
- Ceremonial county: Devon
- Region: South West
- Country: England
- Sovereign state: United Kingdom
- Post town: PLYMOUTH
- Postcode district: PL4 6xx
- Dialling code: 01752
- Police: Devon and Cornwall
- Fire: Devon and Somerset
- Ambulance: South Western

Pennycomequick is the site of a former Devonport prison that today forms part of the inner suburbs of the city of Plymouth, Devon, England.

It is mostly known for its eccentric name, taken, locals believe, from The Penny pub situated by the roundabout north of the railway bridge over Saltash Road. A Brythonic derivation of the name Pen y cwm coet, meaning the head of a wooded valley, or Pen y cwm gwyk, referring to the nearby creek, is a possibility. The roundabout is near the end of the former Deadlake, a sea inlet reclaimed at the end of the 19th century to form Victoria Park.

It is located behind and above the Plymouth railway station and south of Central Park. The area is an assembly point for supporters of Plymouth Argyle Football Club, which is located nearby in Central Park.

The pub closed in 2009 and after changing hands many times, has now been converted into student accommodation.

Most younger Plymothians attach the name only to the large busy roundabout beside the old pub building. In the centre of the roundabout is a prominent curious stunted statue of Isambard Kingdom Brunel with his trademark stovepipe hat.

The one-time MP for Plymouth and then Plymouth Sutton Waldorf Astor, 2nd Viscount Astor, named a racehorse he bred after this area of Plymouth (as he did many others) and the filly won the 1929 Oaks Stakes.
