= 1941 Belmont Stakes =

American horse race

73rd Belmont Stakes
- Belmont Stakes
- Grade I stakes race
- Location: Belmont Park; Elmont, New York, U.S.
- Date: June 7, 1941
- Distance: 1 1/2 mi (12 furlongs; 2,414 m)
- Winning horse: Whirlaway
- Winning time: 2:31
- Jockey: Eddie Arcaro
- Trainer: Ben A. Jones
- Owner: Calumet Farm
- Conditions: Fast
- Surface: Dirt

The 1941 Belmont Stakes was the 73rd running of the Belmont Stakes. It was the 35th Belmont Stakes held at Belmont Park in Elmont, New York and was held on June 7, 1941. With a field of four horses, Whirlaway, the winner of that year's Kentucky Derby and Preakness Stakes, won the 1 1/2–mile race (12 f; 2.4 km) by 2 1/2 lengths over Robert Morris.

With the win, Whirlaway became the fifth Triple Crown champion.

== Results ==
| Finish | PP | Horse | Jockey | Trainer | Owner | Final odds | Earnings US$ |
|---|---|---|---|---|---|---|---|
| 1 | 3 | Whirlaway | Eddie Arcaro | Ben A. Jones | Calumet Farm | .25 | $39,770 |
| 2 | 4 | Robert Morris | Alfred Robertson | Thomas H. McCreery | J. Frederic Byers | 4.30 | $5,000 |
| 3 | 1 | Yankee Chance | Basil James | Edward L. Snyder | Cornelius Vanderbilt Whitney | 36.05 | $2,500 |
| 4 | 2 | Itabo | Carroll Bierman | Max Hirsch | King Ranch | 7.70 | $1,000 |

== Payout ==
| Horse | Straight | Place |
|---|---|---|
| Whirlaway | $2.50 | $2.10 |
| Robert Morris | – | $2.40 |

- Based on a $2 wager. No show wagers sold.
