= Pennycomequick (horse) =

British-bred Thoroughbred racehorse

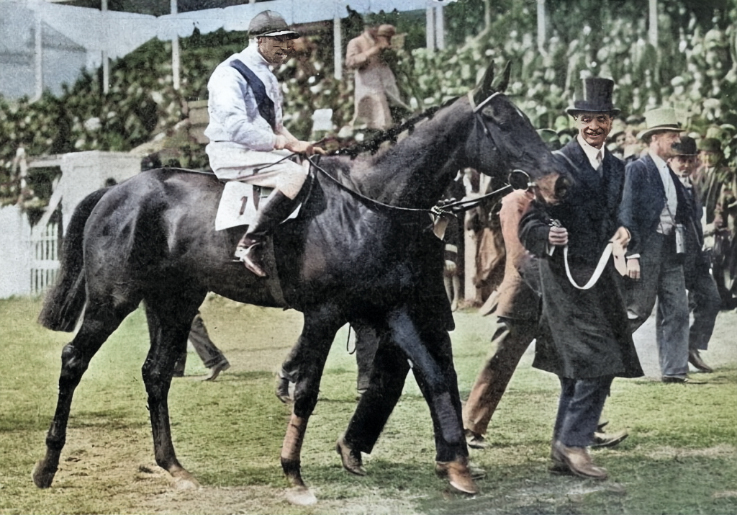
- Pennycomequick at the 1929 Oaks.
- Sire: Hurry On
- Grandsire: Marcovil
- Dam: Plymstock
- Damsire: Polymelus
- Sex: Mare
- Foaled: 1926
- Died: October 1945 (aged 18–19)
- Country: United Kingdom
- Colour: Brown
- Breeder: Lord Astor
- Owner: Lord Astor
- Trainer: Joseph Lawson
- Record: 6: 3-0-0
- Earnings: £9,042

Major wins
- Epsom Oaks (1929)

Pennycomequick (1926 – October 1945) was a British Thoroughbred racehorse and broodmare. She showed promise as a two-year-old in 1928 when she won her only race by a wide margin. In the following year she won two races including a victory in the Epsom Oaks. She failed when made favourite for the St Leger and was retired from racing after sustaining a serious leg injury in autumn. She became a very successful broodmare, producing several major winners.

== Background ==
Pennycomequick was a brown mare "of great power and quality" bred in the United Kingdom by her owner Waldorf Astor, 2nd Viscount Astor. She was sent into training at Manton, Wiltshire with Joseph Lawson who had inherited the stable from Alec Taylor, Jr. in 1927.

She was from the eighth crop of foals sired by the unbeaten champion, Hurry On, making her a representative of the Godolphin Arabian sire line. Apart from Pennycomequick, Hurry On sired numerous major winners including Captain Cuttle, Coronach, Call Boy and Precipitation. Pennycomequick's dam Plymstock was a daughter of the Oaks winner Winkipop and a half-sister to Blink who finished second in the Derby. Like her dam, Pennycomequick was named after a suburb of Plymouth, for which Lord Astor's wife Nancy Astor was the Member of Parliament.

== Racing career ==
=== 1928: two-year-old season ===
On her only appearance as a two-year-old, Pennycomequick defeated seventeen opponents to win the Dalham Stakes at Newmarket Racecourse.

=== 1929: three-year-old season ===
Pennycomequick was entered for the 1000 Guineas at Newmarket but was not among the placed finishers. She then won the Haverhill Stakes over nine furlongs at the same course. On 5 June Pennycomequick started the 11/10 favourite in a field of thirteen runners for the 151st running of the Oaks Stakes over one and a half miles at Epsom Racecourse. On the way to the start she unseated her Belgian jockey Henri Jelliss but then stood "stock still" and allowed her rider to remount. She tracked the leaders as Golden Silence set the pace, before moving into the lead approaching the final turn and quickly drew away from her rivals and won "with great ease" by five lengths from Golden Silence, with Sister Anne two lengths back in third. Jelliss explained that he had briefly shown the winner whip as at the filly appeared to think that the race was over and wanted to stop. Her winning time of 2:35.8 was 0.6 seconds faster than that recorded by Trigo in winning the Epsom Derby over the same course and distance.

The filly was then dropped back in distance for the Coronation Stakes over one mile at Royal Ascot but ran poorly in a race won by Daumont.

In September Pennycomequick was matched against male opposition and started 3/1 favourite for the St Leger at Doncaster Racecourse. She moved up to join the leaders in the straight but faded in the last quarter mile and finished sixth of the nineteen runners behind Trigo. Jellis commented "I thought we would win but... I felt the filly just "dying" in my hands. It looks as if she just does not stay as well as we thought". It was announced shortly after the race that the filly had suffered a split pastern and would be retired from racing.

== Assessment and honours ==
In their book, A Century of Champions, based on the Timeform rating system, John Randall and Tony Morris rated Pennycomequick an "inferior" winner of the Oaks. She is repeatedly alluded to in Monica Dickens' 'World's End' series of children's books.

== Breeding record ==
At the end of her racing career, Pennycomequick was retired tobecome a broodmare for Lord Astor's stud. She produced at least nine foals and seven winners between 1931 and 1943:

- Adept, a bay colt, foaled in 1931, sired by Gainsborough. Winner.
- Bookseller, bay colt (later gelded), 1933, by Buchan. Winner.
- Penicuik, chestnut filly, 1934, by Buchan. Failed to win a race. Dam of Pensive.
- Pound Foolish, bay colt, 1935, by Blandford. Won Princess of Wales's Stakes.
- Quick Ray, chestnut colt, 1936, by Hyperion. Winner.
- Golden Penny, chestnut filly, 1937, by Hyperion. Winner. Second in the 1000 Guineas.
- High Profit, brown colt, 1941, by Hyperion. Winner.
- High Stakes, chestnut colt (gelded), 1942, by Hyperion. Won 34 races including the Ormonde Stakes.
- Hot Coppers, chestnut filly, 1943, by Hyperion. Failed to win a race.

Pennycomequick died in October 1945.

== Pedigree ==
Pedigree of Pennycomequick (GB), brown mare, 1926
Sire Hurry On (GB) 1913	Marcovil (GB); 1903	Marco	Barcaldine
Sire Hurry On (GB) 1913	Marcovil (GB); 1903	Marco	Novitiate
Sire Hurry On (GB) 1913	Marcovil (GB); 1903	Lady Villikins	Hagioscope
Sire Hurry On (GB) 1913	Marcovil (GB); 1903	Lady Villikins	Dinah
Sire Hurry On (GB) 1913	Toute Suite (GB); 1904	Sainfoin	Springfield
Sire Hurry On (GB) 1913	Toute Suite (GB); 1904	Sainfoin	Sanda
Sire Hurry On (GB) 1913	Toute Suite (GB); 1904	Star	Thurio
Sire Hurry On (GB) 1913	Toute Suite (GB); 1904	Star	Meteor
Dam Plymstock (GB) 1918	Polymelus (GB); 1902	Cyllene	Bona Vista
Dam Plymstock (GB) 1918	Polymelus (GB); 1902	Cyllene	Arcadia
Dam Plymstock (GB) 1918	Polymelus (GB); 1902	Maid Marian	Hampton
Dam Plymstock (GB) 1918	Polymelus (GB); 1902	Maid Marian	Quiver
Dam Plymstock (GB) 1918	Winkipop (GB); 1907	William the Third	St Simon
Dam Plymstock (GB) 1918	Winkipop (GB); 1907	William the Third	Gravity
Dam Plymstock (GB) 1918	Winkipop (GB); 1907	Conjure	Juggler
Dam Plymstock (GB) 1918	Winkipop (GB); 1907	Conjure	Connie (Family 1-p)
