= Whirlaway =

American-bred Thoroughbred racehorse (1938–1953)

- Sire: Blenheim
- Grandsire: Blandford
- Dam: Dustwhirl
- Damsire: Sweep
- Sex: Stallion
- Foaled: April 2, 1938; Lexington, Kentucky, U.S.
- Died: April 6, 1953 (aged 15)
- Country: United States
- Color: Chestnut
- Breeder: Calumet Farm
- Owner: Calumet Farm
- Trainer: Ben A. Jones
- Record: 60: 32-15-9
- Earnings: $561,161

Major wins
- Breeders' Futurity Stakes (1940); Hopeful Stakes (1940); Saratoga Special Stakes (1940); Walden Stakes (1940); A. J. Joyner Handicap (1941); Travers Stakes (1941); Lawrence Realization Stakes (1941); Saranac Handicap (1941); Dwyer Stakes (1941); American Derby (1941); Massachusetts Handicap (1942); Narragansett Special (1942); Clark Handicap (1942); Jockey Club Gold Cup (1942); Louisiana Handicap (1942); Washington Handicap (1942); Trenton Handicap (1942); American Classic Race wins: Kentucky Derby (1941); Preakness Stakes (1941); Belmont Stakes (1941)

Awards
- 5th U.S. Triple Crown Champion (1941); 1st Grand Slam Champion (1941); TSD American Champion Two-Year-Old Colt (1940); U.S. Champion 3-Yr-Old Colt (1941); United States Horse of the Year (1941 & 1942); U.S. Champion Older Male Horse (1942)

Honors
- United States Racing Hall of Fame (1959); Fair Grounds Racing Hall of Fame (1991) #26 – Top 100 U.S. Racehorses of the 20th Century; Whirlaway Stakes at Aqueduct Racetrack (1980–2011); Whirlaway Handicap at Fair Grounds Race Course (1973–2004)
- Last updated on 11 February 2021

Whirlaway (April 2, 1938 – April 6, 1953) was a champion American Thoroughbred racehorse who is the fifth winner of the American Triple Crown. He also won the Travers Stakes after his Triple Crown sweep to become the first and only horse to win all four races.

Whirlaway was sired by English Derby winner Blenheim, out of the broodmare Dustwhirl. Whirlaway was bred at Calumet Farm in Lexington, Kentucky. Trained by Ben A. Jones and ridden by Eddie Arcaro, Whirlaway swept the Triple Crown in 1941. He holds the record for the longest winning margin in the Kentucky Derby with fellow Triple Crown winner Assault, as they both won the Derby by 8 lengths. Whirlaway was widely known as "Mr. Longtail" because his tail was especially long and thick and it would blow far out behind him during races, flowing dramatically in the wind.

He was voted the American Champion Two-Year-Old Colt in 1940 by Turf & Sports Digest magazine. The rival Daily Racing Form award was won by Our Boots. Whirlaway was named American Horse of the Year by the Daily Racing Form and Turf & Sport Digest in both 1941, the year he won the Triple Crown, and 1942, the year Shut Out won the Kentucky Derby and Belmont.

== Background ==
Jimmy Jones, son of the colt's trainer, recalled that "Whirlaway was a creature of habit. You had to create habits for him. So we created the habits we wanted him to do." Whirlaway was regarded as having a "quirky" personality. The champion colt had a habit of "bearing out," drifting toward the middle of the racetrack, during the latter part of his races and losing as a result. In preparations for the Kentucky Derby, this had been such a problem that trainer Ben A. Jones fitted the colt with a full-cup blinker over his right eye. In Whirlaway's final workout before the Derby, Jones cut a small hole in the blinker so that the horse had a tiny field of vision. Jones positioned himself ten feet off the inner rail and told jockey Eddie Arcaro to ride the horse through that space. Whirlaway was able to see his trainer, Arcaro was able to keep him on a straight path, and Whirlaway won the Kentucky Derby by tying the current (as of 2018) record margin of 8 lengths.

== Racing record ==
Trained by Ben A. Jones and ridden by Arcaro, Whirlaway won the U.S. Triple Crown in 1941. He also won the Lawrence Realization Stakes and the Travers Stakes that year; Whirlaway is the only horse ever to win both the Triple Crown and the Travers, sometimes referred to as a "superfecta". He was voted the Horse of the Year in 1941, beating Alsab by 96 votes to 91 in a poll conducted by the Turf and Sport Digest magazine. A year later, Whirlaway repeated his win in the poll, beating Alsab with 76 votes to his rival's 45.

Arcaro was the sole rider for Whirlaway in all of his 3-year-old victories, but dismounted for most of the 1942 season, when he served a long suspension for racing infractions. Jockey George Woolf took the reins for the majority of the 1942 season. In a major upset on July 4, 1942, at Empire City Race Track, Whirlaway ran second to Tola Rose who easily won by four lengths in track record time. On July 15, Whirlaway broke the Suffolk Downs track record for a mile and one-eighth with a time of 1:48 1/5 in winning the Massachusetts Handicap. Whirlaway and Alsab continued their 1941 rivalry through 1942. On September 19, 1942, Alsab defeated the Triple Crown champion in a match race at Narragansett Park in Pawtucket, Rhode Island. Although Whirlaway closed strongly through the stretch, Alsab lasted by a nose as both horses flew home through the stretch run. Whirlaway was named Horse of the Year for 1942 after defeating Alsab in a subsequent race and having 12 wins for the year to Alsab's 9.

Woolf, who had previously won the Pimlico Special in 1938 on Seabiscuit and in 1940 on Challedon, rode the 1941 Triple Crown winner at a leisurely pace during the 1942 Pimlico Special in a walkover victory. No opponent had been found to challenge Whirlaway for the race. On December 12, more than twenty thousand people turned out to watch Whirlaway win the inaugural Louisiana Handicap at the Fair Grounds Race Course. The newly formed Thoroughbred Racing Association staged this event as a war-relief effort.

Whirlaway entered stud at Calumet Farm in the spring of 1944 at age six. Among his best offspring were Scattered (winner of the Coaching Club American Oaks); Whirl Some (Selima Stakes), Dart By (All American Handicap) and Whirling Bat (winner of the 1951 Louisiana Derby). In August 1950, Calumet Farm leased Whirlaway to French breeder Marcel Boussac, who stood the horse at his breeding farm, Haras de Fresnay-le-Buffard. Boussac purchased Whirlaway from Calumet in September 1952. The stallion died at Boussac's French stud in 1953.

Whirlaway was elected to the National Museum of Racing and Hall of Fame in 1959. In The Blood-Horse magazine's ranking of the top 100 U.S. thoroughbred champions of the 20th century, he was No. 26. Whirlaway has a race named in his honor at Saratoga Race Course.

== Pedigree ==
Pedigree of Whirlaway
Sire Blenheim brown 1927	Blandford brown 1919	Swynford	John O'Gaunt
Sire Blenheim brown 1927	Blandford brown 1919	Swynford	Canterbury Pilgrim
Sire Blenheim brown 1927	Blandford brown 1919	Blanche	White Eagle
Sire Blenheim brown 1927	Blandford brown 1919	Blanche	Black Cherry
Sire Blenheim brown 1927	Malva brown 1919	Charles O'Malley	Desmond
Sire Blenheim brown 1927	Malva brown 1919	Charles O'Malley	Goody Two-Shoes
Sire Blenheim brown 1927	Malva brown 1919	Wild Arum	Robert Le Diable
Sire Blenheim brown 1927	Malva brown 1919	Wild Arum	Marliacea
Dam Dustwhirl Chestnut 1926	Sweep brown 1907	Ben Brush	Bramble
Dam Dustwhirl Chestnut 1926	Sweep brown 1907	Ben Brush	Roseville
Dam Dustwhirl Chestnut 1926	Sweep brown 1907	Pink Domino	Domino*
Dam Dustwhirl Chestnut 1926	Sweep brown 1907	Pink Domino	Belle Rose
Dam Dustwhirl Chestnut 1926	Ormonda ch. 1916	Superman	Commando*
Dam Dustwhirl Chestnut 1926	Ormonda ch. 1916	Superman	Anomaly
Dam Dustwhirl Chestnut 1926	Ormonda ch. 1916	Princess Ormonde	Ormondale
Dam Dustwhirl Chestnut 1926	Ormonda ch. 1916	Princess Ormonde	Ophirdale

* Whirlaway is inbred 4D x 5D to the stallion Domino, meaning that he appears fourth generation and fifth generation (via Commando) on the dam side of his pedigree.

== See also ==
- List of racehorses
