= 1960 in sports =

1960 in sports describes the year's events in world sport.

== Alpine skiing ==
- The men's Olympic Gold Medal:
  - Downhill: Jean Vuarnet, France
  - Slalom: Ernst Hinterseer, Austria
  - Giant Slalom: Roger Staub, Switzerland
  - The women's Olympic Gold Medal:
  - Downhill: Heidi Biebl, West Germany
  - Slalom: Ann Heggtveit, Canada
  - Giant Slalom: Yvonne Rüegg, Switzerland
- FIS Alpine World Ski Championships:
  - Guy Périllat,
  - Ann HeggtveitAlpine skiing.

== American football ==
- NFL Championship: the Philadelphia Eagles Green Bay PackersFranklin Field
- Cotton Bowl Classic (1959 season):
  - Syracuse OrangemenTexas Longhorns college football national championship.
- National Football LeaguePete RozelleDallasMinneapolis-St.PaulChicago CardinalsSt. Louis.
- American Football League
- First black pro football placekicker: Gene Mingo (Denver Broncos, AFL)
- First Hispanic pro football quarterback: Tom Flores (Oakland Raiders, AFL)
- AFL Championship: Houston Oilers won 24–16 over the Los Angeles Chargers

== Association football ==
- England – FA Cup – Wolverhampton Wanderers won 3–0 over Blackburn Rovers
- The Soviet Union beat Yugoslavia 2–1 to win the first European Football Championship

== Australian rules football ==
- Victorian Football League
  - Melbourne wins the 64th VFL Premiership to McDonalds (Melbourne 8.14 (62) d Collingwood 2.2 (14))
  - Brownlow Medal awarded to John Schultz (Footscray)

== Baseball ==
- World Series – Pittsburgh Pirates win 4 games to 3 over the New York Yankees. The Series MVP is New York's Bobby Richardson.
- October 13 – 1960 World Series Game 7 at Forbes Field – Pittsburgh Pirates player Bill Mazeroski becomes the first person to end a World Series with a home run, and still the only player to do it in the decisive seventh game.
- The Winnipeg Goldeyes win the Northern League championship.

== Basketball ==
NBA Finals

- Boston Celtics win four games to three over the St. Louis Hawks

== Boxing ==
- March 16 – Flash Elorde won the world junior lightweight title with a seventh-round knockout of Harold Gomes in Quezon City, Philippines.
- June – Floyd Patterson recovered the world heavyweight title from Ingemar Johansson, becoming the first-ever boxer to do so.
- September 5 – Cassius Clay wins the gold medal in boxing at the Rome Olympic Games.

== Canadian football ==
- Grey Cup – Ottawa Rough Riders defeated the Edmonton Eskimos 34–9

== Cycling ==
- Tour de France – Gastone Nencini of Italy
- Giro d'Italia – Jacques Anquetil of France

== Field hockey ==
- Olympic Games (Men's Competition) in Rome, Italy
  - Gold Medal: Pakistan
  - Silver Medal: India
  - Bronze Medal: Spain

== Figure Skating ==
- January 30 - US Figure Skating championship Civic Ice Arena in Seattle January 30
  - US female championship won by Carol Heiss
  - US male championship won by David Jenkins
  - The Pairs won Nancy Ludington / Ron Ludington
  - Ice dancing won Margie Ackles / Charles Phillips

== Golf ==
Men's professional

- Masters Tournament – Arnold Palmer
- U.S. Open – Arnold Palmer
- British Open – Kel Nagle
- PGA Championship – Jay Hebert
- PGA Tour money leader – Arnold Palmer – $75,263

Men's amateur

- British Amateur – Joe Carr
- U.S. Amateur – Deane Beman

Women's professional

- Women's Western Open – Joyce Ziske
- LPGA Championship – Mickey Wright
- U.S. Women's Open – Betsy Rawls
- Titleholders Championship – Fay Crocker
- LPGA Tour money leader – Louise Suggs – $16,892

== Harness racing ==
- United States Pacing Triple Crown races –
  1. Cane Pace – Countess Adios
  2. Little Brown Jug – Bullet Hanover
  3. Yonkers Trot – Duke of Decatur
  4. Kentucky Futurity – Elaine Rodney
- Australian Inter Dominion Harness Racing Championship –
  - Pacers: Caduceus

== Horse racing ==
Steeplechases

- Cheltenham Gold Cup – Pas Seul
- Grand National – Merryman II

Flat races

- Australia – Melbourne Cup won by
- Canada – Queen's Plate won by Victoria Park
- France – Prix de l'Arc de Triomphe won by Puissant Chef
- Ireland – Irish Derby Stakes won by Chamour
- English Triple Crown Races:
  1. 2,000 Guineas Stakes – Martial
  2. The Derby – St. Paddy
  3. St. Leger Stakes – St. Paddy
- United States Triple Crown Races:
  1. Kentucky Derby – Venetian Way
  2. Preakness Stakes – Bally Ache
  3. Belmont Stakes – Celtic Ash

== Ice hockey ==
- The American Olympic men's ice-hockey team won the United States' first Olympic hockey gold medal with a record of 7–0–0 during the tournament.
- Art Ross Trophy as the NHL's leading scorer during the regular season: Bobby Hull, Chicago Black Hawks
- Hart Memorial Trophy for the NHL's Most Valuable Player: Gordie Howe, Detroit Red Wings
- Stanley Cup – Montreal Canadiens win 4 games to 0 over the Toronto Maple Leafs
- World Hockey Championship
  - Men's champion: Canada defeats the United States
- NCAA Men's Ice Hockey Championship – University of Denver Pioneers defeat Michigan Technological University Huskies 5–3 in Boston

== Olympic Games ==
- 1960 Summer Olympics held in Rome, Italy
  - USSR wins the most medals (103), and the most gold medals (43)
- 1960 Winter Olympics held in Squaw Valley, United States
  - USSR wins the most medals (21), and the most gold medals (7)
- First Paralympic Games held in Rome, Italy
  - Italy wins the most medals (80) and the most gold medals (29)
- First Winter Universiade held in Chamonix, France

== Rugby league ==
- 1959–60 Kangaroo tour
- 1960 New Zealand rugby league season
- 1959–60 Northern Rugby Football League season / 1960–61 Northern Rugby Football League season
- 1960 NSWRFL season
- 1960 Rugby League World Cup

== Rugby union ==
- 66th Five Nations Championship series is shared by England and France

== Swimming ==
- June 12 – Marianne Heemskerk from the Netherlands breaks the world record in the women's 200m butterfly during a meet in Leipzig, East Germany – 2:34.4.
- July 10 – US swimmer Michael Troy breaks his own world record in the men's 200m butterfly (long course) at a meet in Evansville, Indiana, clocking 2:15.0.
- July 23 – Thirteen days after breaking his own world record in the men's 200m butterfly (long course) Troy once again betters the world's best time in that event, this time at a meet in Toledo, Ohio clocking 2:13.4.
- August 4 – Less than a month before the Summer Olympics in Rome, Italy, Troy again breaks the world record in the men's 200m butterfly (long course), when he clocks 2:13.2 at a meet in Detroit, Michigan.
- September 2 – Michael Troy wins the men's 200m butterfly (long course) at the Summer Olympics in Rome, Italy by breaking his own world record – 2:12.8.

== Tennis ==
Australia

- Australian Men's Singles Championship – Rod Laver (Australia) defeats Neale Fraser (Australia) 5–7, 3–6, 6–3, 8–6, 8–6
- Australian Women's Singles Championship – Margaret Smith Court (Australia) defeats Jan Lehane O'Neill (Australia) 7–5, 6–2

England

- Wimbledon Men's Singles Championship – Neale Fraser (Australia) defeats Rod Laver (Australia) 6–4, 3–6, 9–7, 7–5
- Wimbledon Women's Singles Championship – Maria Bueno (Brazil) defeats Sandra Reynolds Price (South Africa) 8–6, 6–0

France

- French Men's Singles Championship – Nicola Pietrangeli (Italy) defeats Luis Ayala (Chile) 3–6, 6–3, 6–4, 4–6, 6–3
- French Women's Singles Championship – Darlene Hard (USA) defeats Yola Ramírez (Mexico) 6–3, 6–4

USA

- American Men's Singles Championship – Neale Fraser (Australia) defeats Rod Laver (Australia) 6–4, 6–4, 9–7
- American Women's Singles Championship – Darlene Hard (USA) defeats Maria Bueno (Brazil) 6–4, 10–12, 6–4

Davis Cup

- 1960 Davis Cup – Australia 4–1 Italy at White City Stadium (grass) Sydney, Australia

== Volleyball ==
- 1960 FIVB Men's World Championship in Rio de Janeiro won by the USSR

== Awards ==
- Associated Press Male Athlete of the Year – Rafer Johnson, Track and field
- Associated Press Female Athlete of the Year – Wilma Rudolph, Track and field
