= 1960 Preakness Stakes =

85th running of the Preakness Stakes

85th Preakness Stakes
- The Preakness Stakes
- Location: Pimlico Race Course, Baltimore, Maryland, United States
- Date: May 21, 1960
- Winning horse: Bally Ache
- Jockey: Robert Ussery
- Conditions: Fast
- Surface: Dirt

The 1960 Preakness Stakes was the 85th running of the $175,000 Preakness Stakes thoroughbred horse race. The race took place on May 21, 1960, and was televised in the United States on the CBS television network. Bally Ache, who was jockeyed by Robert Ussery, won the race by four lengths over runner-up Victoria Park. Approximate post time was 5:48 p.m. Eastern Time. The race was run on a fast track in a final time of 1:57-3/5 The Maryland Jockey Club reported total attendance of 30,659, this is recorded as second highest on the list of American thoroughbred racing top attended events for North America in 1960.

== Payout ==
The 85th Preakness Stakes Payout Schedule

Program Number	Horse Name	Win	Place	Show
1	Bally Ache	$5.40	$2.80	-
4	Victoria Park	-	$5.80	-
no show	No Show; Mutuels Taken	-	-	-

== The full chart ==
Finish Position	Margin (lengths)	Post Position	Horse name	Jockey	Trainer	Owner	Post Time Odds	Purse Earnings
1st	0	1	Bally Ache	Robert Ussery	Jimmy Pitt	Edgehill Farm (Leonard D. & Morris Fruchtman)	1.70-1	$122,600
2nd	4	4	Victoria Park	Anthony DeSpirito	Horatio Luro	Windfields Farm	8.10-1	$30,000
3rd	53/4	3	Celtic Ash	Sam Boulmetis	Thomas J. Barry	Green Dunes Farm	7.70-1	$15,000
4th	8	6	Divine Comedy	Larry Gilligan	Charles E. Whittingham	Llangollen Farm Stable	47.90-1	$7,500
5th	81/2	5	Venetian Way	Bill Hartack	Victor J. Sovinski	Sunny Blue Farm (Isaac Blumberg)	1.10-1 favorite	
6th	91/2	2	T. V. Lark	William Harmatz	Paul K. Parker	C. R. Mac Stable	15.30-1	

- Winning Breeder: Gaines Brothers (Marvin & Alan); (KY)
- Winning Time: 1:57 3/5
- Track Condition: Fast
- Total Attendance: 30,659
