= 1960 Kentucky Derby =

Horse race

86th Kentucky Derby
- Kentucky Derby
- Grade I stakes race
- Location: Churchill Downs
- Date: May 7, 1960
- Winning horse: Venetian Way
- Jockey: Bill Hartack
- Trainer: Victor J. Sovinski
- Owner: Sunny Blue Farm
- Surface: Dirt

The 1960 Kentucky Derby was the 86th running of the Kentucky Derby. The race took place on May 7, 1960.

== Full results ==
Finished	Post	Horse	Jockey	Trainer	Owner	Time / behind
1st	7	Venetian Way	Bill Hartack	Victor J. Sovinski	Sunny Blue Farm (Isaac Blumberg)	2:02 2/5
2nd	2	Bally Ache	Bobby Ussery	Jimmy Pitt	Edgehill Farm (Leonard D. & Morris Fruchtman)	
3rd	9	Victoria Park	Manuel Ycaza	Horatio Luro	Windfields Farm	
4th	11	Tompion	Bill Shoemaker	Robert L. Wheeler	Cornelius Vanderbilt Whitney	
5th	8	Bourbon Prince	Chris Rogers	William Ward Stephens	Mrs. Adele L. Rand	
6th	3	Cuvier Relic	Johnny Sellers	Milton Rinke	Snyder I. Crew	
7th	5	Tony Graff	Wayne Chambers	Nicholas Graffagnini	Anthony Graffagnini	
8th	12	Spring Broker	John L. Rotz	Marion Van Berg	Marion Van Berg	
9th	10	Divine Comedy	Ismael Valenzuela	Charles E. Whittingham	Llangollen Farm Stable	
10th	13	Fighting Hodge	Donald Pierce	Carl S. Hodge	Mrs. Carl S. Hodge	
11th	1	Yomolka	Phil Grimm	George Weber	Valley Farms	
12th	4	Lurullah	Steve Brooks	Vester R. Wright	T. Alie Grissom	
13th	14	Henrijan	Angel Valenzuela	Farrell W. Jones	Mr. & Mrs. Stephen H. Elmore	
