= DiSpirito =

DiSpirito is an Italian surname. Notable people with this surname include:

- Bob DiSpirito (1928–2015), American college football and college baseball player and coach
- Rocco DiSpirito (born 1966), American chef and reality television personality

== See also ==
- Anthony DeSpirito (1935–1975), American horse racing jockey
