= Pentelicus =

Pentelicus may refer to:

- Pentelicus Mountain, a tall mountain and mountain range situated northeast of Athens and southwest of Marathon
- Pentelicus (horse), a horse winner of the Mayflower Stakes in 1986
- Pentelicus (wasp), a wasp genus in the subfamily Encyrtinae
