= Peter Pan Stakes =

- Class: Grade III
- Location: Belmont Park; Elmont, New York, United States
- Inaugurated: 1940
- Race type: Thoroughbred – Flat racing
- Website: www.nyra.com

Race information
- Distance: 1 1/8 miles (9 furlongs)
- Surface: Dirt
- Track: left-handed
- Qualification: Three-year-olds
- Weight: Assigned
- Purse: US$200,000

The Peter Pan Stakes is a Grade III American Thoroughbred horse race for three-year-olds over a distance of 1 1/8 miles (nine furlongs) run annually during the second week of May at Belmont Park in Elmont, New York.

== History ==
The race is run in honor of National Museum of Racing and Hall of Fame inductee Peter Pan. Inaugurated in 1940, it was run as a handicap at one and one eighth miles until 1960 when the race was placed on hiatus. Revived at Aqueduct Racetrack in 1975, the Peter Pan Stakes was moved to Belmont Park for the 1976 running. It was contested at a distance of one mile until 1977 when it reverted to its traditional one and one eighth mile format.

The race is considered a major preparatory race for the last leg of the Triple Crown, the Belmont Stakes, since both are traditionally held on the same track. In cases where a horse did not enter the Kentucky Derby or Preakness Stakes, several horses have won the Peter Pan Stakes / Belmont Stakes double. These include High Gun (1954), Gallant Man (1957), Cavan (1958), Coastal (1979), A.P. Indy (1992), Tonalist (2014) and Arcangelo (2023). Due to the effects of the COVID-19 pandemic, the 2020 Peter Pan Stakes was run on Opening Day at Saratoga Race Course. In 2024 and 2025, the race was contested at Aqueduct because of construction at Belmont Park.

== Records ==
Speed record: (at current distance of 1 1/8 miles)

- 1:46.35 – Oratory (2005)

Most wins by a jockey:

- 4 – Eddie Maple (1975, 1993, 1995, 1997)

Most wins by a trainer:

- 5 – Todd A. Pletcher (2004, 2006, 2015, 2021, 2024)

Most wins by an owner:

- 3 – Cornelius V. Whitney (1945, 1951, 1956)

== Winners ==
Year	Winner	Jockey	Trainer	Owner	Time
2026	Growth Equity	Flavien Prat	Chad C. Brown	Klaravich Stables	1:50.25
2025	Hill Road	Flavien Prat	Chad C. Brown	AMO Racing USA	1:49.22
2024	Antiquarian	John R. Velazquez	Todd A. Pletcher	Centennial Farms	1:48.99
2023	Arcangelo	Javier Castellano	Jena Antonucci	Blue Rose Farm	1:49.71
2022	We The People	Flavien Prat	Rodolphe Brisset	WinStar Farm, & Siena Farm	1:48.27
2021	Promise Keeper	Luis Saez	Todd A. Pletcher	WinStar Farm, Woodford Thoroughbreds, and Rockridge Stud	1:50.71
2020	Country Grammer	Irad Ortiz Jr.	Chad Brown	Paul P. Pompa Jr.	1:49.79
2019	Global Campaign	Luis Saez	Stanley M. Hough	Sagamore Farm, LLC and WinStar Farm	1:46.71
2018	Blended Citizen	Kyle Frey	Doug F. O'Neill	Hall, Greg and SAYJAY Racing, LLC	1:49.75
2017	Timeline	Javier Castellano	Chad C. Brown	Woodford Racing	1:51.62
2016	Unified (ARG)	José L. Ortiz	James A. Jerkens	Centennial Farms	1:47.14
2015	Madefromlucky	Javier Castellano	Todd A. Pletcher	Cheyenne Stables/Nichol	1:48.36
2014	Tonalist	Joel Rosario	Christophe Clement	Robert S. Evans	1:48.30
2013	Freedom Child	Luis Saez	Thomas Albertrani	West Point Thoroughbreds, St. Elias Stable, and Spendthrift Farm	1:49.09
2012	Mark Valeski	Rosie Napravnik	J. Larry Jones	Brereton Jones	1:48.31
2011	Alternation	Ramon Domínguez	Donnie K. Von Hemel	Pin Oak Stable	1:49.53
2010	Race not run				
2009	Charitable Man	Alan Garcia	Kiaran McLaughlin	Suzanne & William Warren	1:47.13
2008	Casino Drive	Kent Desormeaux	Kazuo Fujisawa	Hidetoshi Yamamoto	1:47.87
2007	Sightseeking	Edgar Prado	Claude R. McGaughey III	Phipps Stable	1:48.89
2006	Sunriver	Rafael Bejarano	Todd A. Pletcher	Aaron & Marie Jones	1:49.39
2005	Oratory	Jerry Bailey	Thomas Albertrani	Darley Stable	1:46.35
2004	Purge	John Velazquez	Todd A. Pletcher	Starlight Stables et al.	1:47.98
2003	Go Rockin' Robin	Shaun Bridgmohan	Scott Schwartz	Herbert & Carol Schwartz	1:48.47
2002	Sunday Break	Gary Stevens	Neil D. Drysdale	Koji Maeda	1:48.10
2001	Hero's Tribute	Jorge F. Chavez	John T. Ward Jr.	John C. Oxley	1:47.47
2000	Postponed	Edgar Prado	Flint S. Schulhofer	Jeanne G. Vance	1:49.60
1999	Best of Luck	Jean-Luc Samyn	H. Allen Jerkens	Bohemia Stable	1:47.94
1998	Grand Slam	Jerry Bailey	D. Wayne Lukas	Baker, et al.	1:49.00
1997	Banker's Gold	Eddie Maple	H. Allen Jerkens	Georgia Hofmann	1:48.60
1996	Jaimes First Punch	John Velazquez	Robert Barbara	Zimpom Stable	1:47.20
1995	Citadeed	Eddie Maple	Richard Violette Jr.	Ivan W. Allan	1:50.03
1994	Twining	José A. Santos	Flint S. Schulhofer	Mohammed Al Maktoum	1:49.11
1993	Virginia Rapids	Eddie Maple	H. Allen Jerkens	Middletown Stable	1:48.48
1992	A.P. Indy	Ed Delahoussaye	Neil D. Drysdale	Tomonori Tsurumaki	1:47.40
1991	Lost Mountain	Craig Perret	Thomas Bohannan	Loblolly Stable	1:49.40
1990	Profit Key	José A. Santos	D. Wayne Lukas	H. Joseph Allen	1:47.20
1989	Imbibe	Ángel Cordero Jr.	Tim Kelly	Roslyn Farm	1:48.60
1988	Seeking The Gold	Pat Day	Claude R. McGaughey III	Ogden Phipps	1:47.60
1987	Leo Castelli	José A. Santos	LeRoy Jolley	Peter M. Brant	1:48.00
1986	Danzig Connection	Pat Day	Woody Stephens	Henryk de Kwiatkowski	1:48.40
1985	Proud Truth	Jorge Velásquez	John M. Veitch	Darby Dan Farm	1:47.60
1984	Back Bay Barrister	Don MacBeth	Vincent Blengs	Myra H. Cohen	1:50.00
1983	Slew o' Gold	Ángel Cordero Jr.	Sidney Watters Jr.	Equusequity Stable	1:46.80
1982	Wolfie's Rascal	Ángel Cordero Jr.	Howard M. Tesher	Wolfie Cohen	1:48.80
1981	Tap Shoes	Ruben Hernandez	Horatio Luro	Leone J. Peters	1:48.40
1980	Comptroller	Ramon Encinas	Angel Penna Sr.	Ogden Phipps	1:49.20
1979	Coastal	Ruben Hernandez	David A. Whiteley	William Haggin Perry	1:47.00
1978	Buckaroo	Jorge Velásquez	John M. Gaver Jr.	Greentree Stable	1:48.00
1977	Spirit Level	Antonio Graell	Stephen A. DiMauro	Meadow Stable	1:49.20
1976	Sir Lister	Jorge Velásquez	MacKenzie Miller	Mrs. Harold Whitmore	1:36.00
1975	Singh	Eddie Maple	John W. Russell	Cynthia Phipps	1:35.20
1960	Keenation	Chris Rogers	Raymond Metcalf	Elkcam Stable (Mackle brothers)	1:50.00
1959	Black Hills	Eddie Arcaro	Max Hirsch	King Ranch	1:49.00
1958	Cavan	Pete Anderson	Thomas J. Barry	Joseph E. O'Connell	1:49.00
1957	Gallant Man	Bill Shoemaker	John A. Nerud	Ralph Lowe	1:48.40
1956	Jazz Age	John Choquette	Sylvester Veitch	Cornelius V. Whitney	1:48.40
1955	Nance's Lad	John Choquette	Hilton Dabson	Hilton Dabson	1:48.40
1954	High Gun	Eric Guerin	Max Hirsch	King Ranch	1:52.40
1953	Invigorator	Nick Shuk	Norman R. McLeod	Saxon Stable	1:50.40
1952	Armageddon	Raymond York	Moody Jolley	Cain Hoy Stable	1:48.60
1951	Counterpoint	Dave Gorman	Sylvester Veitch	Cornelius V. Whitney	1:47.80
1950	Lights Up	George Hettinger	Bert Mulholland	George D. Widener Jr.	1:49.40
1949	Ponder	Steve Brooks	Horace A. Jones	Calumet Farm	1:49.40
1948	Escadru	Arnold Kirkland	Edward A. Christmas	William L. Brann	1:49.60
1947	Tailspin	Ted Atkinson	John M. Gaver Sr.	Greentree Stable	1:50.60
1946	Mahout	Johnny Longden	Oscar White	Sarah F. Jeffords	1:50.40
1945	Jeep	Eddie Arcaro	Andy Schuttinger	Cornelius V. Whitney	1:51.20
1944	Lucky Draw	Johnny Longden	Bert Mulholland	George D. Widener Jr.	1:52.00
1943	Slide Rule	Conn McCreary	Cecil Wilhelm	William E. Boeing	1:51.20
1942	Fairaris	Billie Thompson	Frank Gilpin	Samuel McLaughlin	1:48.40
1941	Robert Morris	Alfred Robertson	Thomas H. McCreery	J. Frederic Byers	1:49.00
1940	Andy K.	Irving Anderson	Patrick F. Dwyer	Millsdale Stable	1:50.20
