= Cavan (horse) =

Irish-bred Thoroughbred racehorse

- Sire: Mossborough
- Grandsire: Nearco
- Dam: Willow Ann
- Damsire: Solario
- Sex: Stallion
- Foaled: 1955
- Country: Ireland
- Colour: Chestnut
- Breeder: F. E. Tuthill
- Owner: Joseph E. O'Connell
- Trainer: Thomas J. Barry
- Record: 11: 6-1-1
- Earnings: $137,507

Major wins
- Leonard Richards Stakes (1958); Peter Pan Handicap (1958) American Classic Race wins: Belmont Stakes (1958)

Cavan (foaled 1955) was an Irish Thoroughbred racehorse who won the Belmont Stakes in 1958.

== Background ==
Cavan was a chestnut horse bred in Great Britain by F. E. Tuthill. His dam, Willow Ann, a daughter Solario went on to produce the St Leger winner Indiana. Cavan was sired by Mossborough (a son of Nearco) who was best known Europe as the sire of Ballymoss.

Cavan was purchased by Boston, Massachusetts banker Joseph E. O'Connell at the suggestion of Irish-born trainer Tom Barry who believed that an Irish horse was better suited for longer distances and had an edge in such American races as the prestigious Belmont Stakes. He was named after the town of Cavan in Ireland.

== Racing career ==
Racing in the United States in 1958, Cavan won the Leonard Richards Stakes at Delaware Park Racetrack then won the Belmont Stakes at Belmont Park in Elmont, New York, spoiling the Kentucky Derby and Preakness Stakes winner Tim Tam's bid to capture the U.S. Triple Crown.

After his victory in the Belmont Stakes, Cavan next won the Peter Pan Handicap on the same track but came out of the race with an injury that ended his career.

== Stud record ==
Retired to stud, Cavan met with modest success as a sire. Of his progeny, the most notable was a daughter, Miss Cavandish, who in 1964 won the Monmouth Oaks, Delaware Oaks, Alabama Stakes and Coaching Club American Oaks.

Two years after Cavan won the Belmont Stakes, Tom Barry and Joseph O'Connell came back with another Irish purchase, a colt named Celtic Ash who gave them their second Belmont Stakes win in 1960.
