= Deshawn L. Parker =

Deshawn Parker
Personal information
- Born: January 8, 1971 (age 55) Cincinnati, Ohio, US
- Occupation: Jockey

Horse racing career
- Sport: Horse racing
- Career wins: 6,377 (ongoing)

Major racing wins
- selected stakes wins: Autumn Leaves Stakes (2005); Labor Day Stakes (2007); Mountaineer Mile Stakes (2007, 2008, 2013); Best of Ohio Juvenile Stakes (2008); Hancock County Handicap (2008, 2009); Mountaineer Fall Stakes (2008, 2009); Panhandle Handicap (2008); Senator Robert C. Byrd Memorial Handicap (2011); John W. Galbreath Stakes (2012); Rose DeBartolo Memorial Stakes (2012); Miss Ohio Stakes (2012); Hoover Stakes (2012); Mountaineer Juvenile Fillies Stakes (2012); Cleveland Kindergarten Stakes (2012); Firecracker Stakes (2012); Royal North Stakes (2013); Tom Ridge Stakes (2014); West Virginia Governor's Stakes (2015); Green Carpet Stakes (2015); Howard B. Noonan Stakes (2015); Sam Houston Sprint Cup Stakes (2015, 2016); San Jacinto Stakes (2016); Indiana Futurity (2017); Crown Ambassador Stakes (2017); Hillsdale Stakes (2017); Florence Henderson Stakes (2017); Yellow Rose Stakes (2017); Spirit of Texas Stakes (2017); San Jacinto Turf Stakes (2017)

Racing awards
- United States Champion Jockey by wins (2010, 2011)

Honors
- Sam Houston Race Park Champion Jockey (2015)

Significant horses
- Bernie Blue, La Chica Rica, Marina's Legacy, Texas Chrome

Deshawn L. Parker (born January 8, 1971) is an American Thoroughbred horse racing jockey who is a two-time United States Champion. In addition, on May 2, 2016, he became only the thirty-second jockey in the history of North American Thoroughbred racing to win 5,000 races. On June 21, 2022, while racing at Horseshoe Indianapolis, Parker rode his 6,000th career winner, For Mama, becoming one of only 21 jockeys to reach that milestone.

== Career ==
Deshawn Parker began his professional riding career in 1988. At 5 ft 11 in (1.80 m), he is one of the tallest jockeys in racing. In his first five years riding from 1988 through 1992, Deshawn Parker won just 60 races in total. The next year he won 72, more than the previous five combined and continued to improve. In 2002 he broke into the 200 level and in 2008 reached 300 plus wins for the first time and would accomplish that for five straight years including 2011 when he attained 400 wins.

In 2010, Deshawn Parker won 377 races to earn his first national title. It marked the first time an African-American had done so in the sport since James "Soup" Perkins one hundred and fifteen years earlier in 1895. Parker won his second national title in 2011 with 400 wins. He is also the winningest African-American in history. On May 6, 2012, Parker won six races on a single racecard at Mountaineer Racetrack in New Cumberland, West Virginia, where he had made his home base for many years and where he is the all-time leading jockey in wins. In 2012, he was honored by the Jockeys' Guild with its Laffit Pincay Jr. Award and three times has been a finalist for the George Woolf Memorial Jockey Award winning in 2021.
