= West Virginia Governor's Stakes =

- Class: Listed
- Location: Mountaineer Racetrack; Chester, West Virginia, United States
- Inaugurated: 1995 (as West Virginia Governor's Cup Handicap)
- Race type: Thoroughbred - Flat racing
- Website: Mountaineer Park

Race information
- Distance: 1 1/16 miles (8.5 furlongs)
- Surface: Dirt
- Track: left-handed
- Qualification: Three-years-old and older
- Weight: Base weights with allowances: 4-year-olds and up: 124 lbs. 3-year-olds: 122 lbs.
- Purse: $200,000

The West Virginia Governor's Stakes is a Listed American thoroughbred horse race for horses aged three years old and older over a distance of one and one-sixteenth miles on the dirt held annually in August at Mountaineer Race Track in Chester, West Virginia. The event currently carries a purse of $200,000.

== History ==
The inaugural running of the event was on 8 September 1995 as the first race on a nine race program on the West Virginia Breeders Classic Stakes Day. The event was run as the West Virginia Governor's Cup Handicap over a five furlong distance.

The event was not held in 1996. In 1997 the event was run as the West Virginia Governor's Handicap over a distance of 1 1/16 miles and was the main event of the day's racing card.

In 2005 the conditions of the event were changed from handicap to stakes allowance and the name of the event was modified to the West Virginia Governor's Stakes.

In 2007 the event was won by the eight-year-old M B Sea for the second time. Both of the victories by M B Sea were by seven lengths which stood as the margin record until Shadowbdancing won by eight lengths in 2009.

Joan & Ron Winchell, who race as Winchell Thoroughbreds, won this race in 2012 with Tapizar and went on to win the Breeders' Cup Dirt Mile in the fall.

In 2015, the race saw a major upset when longshot Looks To Spare won under jockey Deshawn Parker. A perennial Mountaineer Racetrack champion and its all-time winningest jockey, when Parker rides it is near automatic that the fans will heavily back him. However, Looks To Spare was considered such an unlikely winner that he was allowed to go off at odds of 74–1. He paid $150.60 to win on a $2 ticket.

The race has grown in stature over the years and in 2018 the race was upgraded by the Thoroughbred Owners and Breeders Association to Grade 3 status.

In 2020 due to the COVID-19 pandemic in the United States, Mountaineer Park canceled the event.

In 2025 the event was downgraded by the Thoroughbred Owners and Breeders Association to Listed status.

== Records ==
Speed record:

- 1 1/16 miles - 1:41.15 Be Like Mike (2003)

Margins:

- 8 lengths - Shadowbdancing (2009)

Most wins:

- 2 - M B Sea (2005, 2007)

Most wins by a jockey:

- 3 - Florent Geroux (2018, 2024, 2025)

Most wins by a trainer:

- 5 - Brad H. Cox (2014, 2018, 2022, 2024, 2025)

Most wins by an owner:

- 2 - Michael J. Bruder (2005, 2007)
- 2 - Winchell Thoroughbreds (2008, 2012)
- 2 - Gary & Mary West (2024, 2025)

== Winners ==
Year	Winner	Age	Jockey	Trainer	Owner	Distance	Time	Purse	Grade	Ref
West Virginia Governor's Stakes
2025	Hit Show	5	Florent Geroux	Brad H. Cox	Gary & Mary West	1 1/16 miles	1:43.63	$200,000	III	
2024	Hit Show	4	Florent Geroux	Brad H. Cox	Gary & Mary West	1 1/16 miles	1:42.65	$200,000	III	
2023	Duke of Love	4	Luis Contreras	Josie Carroll	MyRacehorse	1 1/16 miles	1:42.39	$200,000	III	
2022	Fulsome	4	Paco Lopez	Brad H. Cox	Juddmonte	1 1/16 miles	1:43.48	$200,000	III	
2021	Sprawl	4	Joseph Talamo	Thomas Drury Jr.	Claiborne Farm & Adele B. Dilschneider	1 1/16 miles	1:44.95	$200,000	III	
2020	Race not held									
2019	Silver Dust	5	Jack Gilligan	W. Bret Calhoun	Tom R. Durant	1 1/16 miles	1:43.85	$200,000	III	
2018	Leofric	5	Florent Geroux	Brad H. Cox	Steve Landers Racing	1 1/16 miles	1:42.72	$200,000	III	
2017	Fear the Cowboy	5	Jesus M. Rios	Efren Loza Jr.	Kathleen Amaya & Raffaele Centofanti	1 1/16 miles	1:44.62	$200,000	Listed	
2016	Hawaakom	6	Miguel Mena	Stephan H. Smoot	Stephan H. Smoot & Wesley E. Hawley	1 1/16 miles	1:44.64	$200,000	Listed	
2015	Looks to Spare	5	Deshawn L. Parker	Otabek Umarov	O'zbekiston Racing	1 1/16 miles	1:44.55	$200,000	Listed	
2014	Carve	4	Jesus Lopez Castanon	Brad H. Cox	Mike Langford	1 1/16 miles	1:44.44	$200,000	Listed	
2013	Taptowne	5	Calvin H. Borel	Tim Glyshaw	Clovertowne Farm	1 1/16 miles	1:44.90	$200,000	Listed	
2012	Tapizar	4	Corey Nakatani	Steven M. Asmussen	Winchell Thoroughbreds	1 1/16 miles	1:42.57	$200,000	Listed	
2011	Modern Cowboy	4	Rafael Bejarano	Todd A. Pletcher	Green Hills Farm	1 1/16 miles	1:45.40	$125,000	Listed	
2010	Demarcation	6	Joel Rosario	Paul J. McGee	American Racing Stables	1 1/16 miles	1:44.37	$125,000	Listed	
2009	Shadowbdancing	4	Randall A. Meier	Terrel Gore	RNB Racing	1 1/16 miles	1:44.10	$125,000	Listed	
2008	Zanjero	4	Shaun Bridgmohan	Steven M. Asmussen	Winchell Thoroughbreds	1 1/16 miles	1:44.65	$125,000	Listed	
2007	M B Sea	8	Rex A. Stokes III	Dale L. Romans	Michael J. Bruder	1 1/16 miles	1:46.96	$125,000	Listed	
2006	Cherokee's Boy	6	Travis L. Dunkelberger	Gary Capuano	Z W P Stable	1 1/16 miles	1:44.72	$125,000	Listed	
2005	M B Sea	6	Mark Guidry	Dale L. Romans	Michael J. Bruder	1 1/16 miles	1:43.82	$125,000	Listed	
West Virginia Governor's Handicap
2004	Wiggins	4	Rafael Bejarano	Anthony J. Granitz	William Pacella, Joseph Rizza & Ronald Schwed	1 1/16 miles	1:43.37	$100,000	Listed	
2003	Be Like Mike	4	Jorge F. Chavez	Niall M. O'Callaghan	G-3 Racing	1 1/16 miles	1:41.15	$102,825	Listed	
2002	Docent	4	Jeremy Rose	Timothy F. Ritchey	Arlene Daney	1 1/16 miles	1:42.24	$88,500	Listed	
2001	Winning Connection	5	Damon Leeds	Joe Woodard	Billy Hays	1 1/16 miles	1:43.94	$57,750	Listed	
2000	Shock Value	5	Rick Wilson	Daniel J. Lopez	Daniel J. Lopez & Theodore Shapiro	1 1/16 miles	1:44.64	$52,650	Listed	
1999	True Silver	4	Jeffrey Scott Lloyd	Donald P. Saville	Heavenly Acres Farm	1 1/16 miles	1:44.64	$37,450	Listed	
1998	Xclusive Imp	4	Mary Elizabeth Doser	John R. Semer	Elaine M. Gross	1 1/16 miles	1:44.44	$37,275		
1997	Regal Rahy	4	Michael F. Rowland	Charles A. Tatonetti	Preferred Picks Racing Stable	1 1/16 miles	1:45.62	$27,000		
1996	Race not held									
West Virginia Governor's Cup Handicap
1995	I'm No Square	6	John A. Perez Jr.	Louis P. Gallo	Louis P. Gallo	5 furlongs	0:58.65	$11,725		

== See also ==
List of American and Canadian Graded races
