= Tompion =

Thoroughbred racehorse

- Sire: Tom Fool
- Grandsire: Menow
- Dam: Sunlight
- Damsire: Count Fleet
- Sex: Stallion
- Foaled: 1957
- Country: United States
- Colour: Brown
- Breeder: Cornelius Vanderbilt Whitney
- Owner: Cornelius Vanderbilt Whitney
- Trainer: Robert L. Wheeler
- Record: 39: 11-11-6
- Earnings: $545,173

Major wins
- Hopeful Stakes (1959); Malibu Stakes (1960); Forerunner Stakes (1960); Santa Anita Derby (1960); Blue Grass Stakes (1960); Travers Stakes (1960); Bernard Baruch Handicap (1960); Malibu Stakes (1960); Aqueduct Handicap (1961)

Tompion (1957–?) was an American Thoroughbred race horse.

== Background ==
Immaculately bred, Tompion was the son of the Hall of Fame horse Tom Fool out of the mare Sunlight. His damsire was Count Fleet, the 1943 U.S. Triple Crown champion. During his racing career he was owned by Cornelius Vanderbilt Whitney and trained by Robert L. Wheeler.

== Racing career ==
As a two-year-old, Tompion won the Hopeful Stakes, and placed in the Champagne Stakes, the Hollywood Juvenile Championship Stakes, the Saratoga Special Stakes and the Sanford Stakes. He came third in the Garden State Stakes and the Haggin Stakes.

Ridden by Willie Shoemaker, at age three Tompion won the Santa Anita Derby and the Blue Grass Stakes. The favorite going into the 1960 Kentucky Derby, the colt threw a shoe and finished fourth behind winner Venetian Way and runners-up Bally Ache and Victoria Park. After losing the shoe, Tompion's hoof was injured by one of the nails and as a result he missed the Preakness Stakes but still went into the Belmont Stakes as the betting favorite. After a head-to-head duel with Derby winner Venetian Way, he tired in the longer 1½ mile race and finished fourth to winner Celtic Ash. That year Tompion went on to win the Travers Stakes, Bernard Baruch Handicap and Malibu Stakes. He placed in the Jersey Derby, the Lawrence Realization Stakes, and the Leonard Richards Stakes. In the San Miguel Stakes he came home third.

Racing at age four, Tompion won the Aqueduct Handicap, placed in the United Nations Handicap, and the San Fernando Stakes. He took third place in the Saratoga Handicap and the Fayette Handicap.

== Stud record ==
Tompion was sent to France to stand at stud, and then at the age of 18, went to Japan. He was the sire of eleven stakes winners.
