= Jimmy Pitt =

American horseracing trainer

Personal information
- Born: 1920 Nashville, Tennessee, United States
- Died: November 21, 1965 (aged 44–45) Camden, New Jersey, United States
- Resting place: Sylvan Abbey Memorial Park Cemetery, Clearwater, Florida
- Occupation: Trainer

Horse racing career
- Sport: Horse racing

Major racing wins
- Comely Stakes (1959); Great American Stakes (1959); Hialeah Juvenile Stakes (1959); Mayflower Stakes (1959); Bahamas Stakes (1960); Flamingo Stakes (1960); Florida Derby (1960); Hibiscus Stakes (1960); Jersey Derby (1960); Stepping Stone Purse (1960); Christiana Stakes (1965); Futurity Trial Stakes (1965); Great American Stakes (1965); Juvenile Stakes (1965); Tyro Stakes (1965) U.S. Triple Crown wins: Preakness Stakes (1960)

Racing awards
- Florida Turf Writers Association Outstanding Florida Trainer (1960)

Significant horses
- Bally Ache, Bee Lee Tee, Our Michael

Homer James "Jimmy" Pitt (1920 – November 21, 1965) was an American Thoroughbred horse racing trainer who race conditioned Bally Ache to win the 1960 Preakness Stakes, the second leg of the U.S. Triple Crown series.

In addition to his skills handling Thoroughbreds, Jimmy Pitt was widely respected as a man of character. A resident of Safety Harbor, Florida, he was the operator of a public stable based at nearby Sunshine Park. He was described in a February 14, 1960 Ocala Star Banner article as a quiet spoken man who did not seek to "bask in the limelight." The newspaper referenced a 1959 magazine article by John Lardner about his reputation and a trainer who had accomplished the remarkable feat of keeping a horse named Bee Lee Tee sound and still racing at the age of 12. Owned and trained by Pitt, on March 14, 1959, the gelding had surpassed the $100,000 mark in career earnings, an amount close to $1,000,000 in 2021 dollars based on inflation. His success with Bally Ache led to the Florida Turf Writers Association voting Jimmy Pitt the state's outstanding trainer of 1960.

Jimmy Pitt died on November 21, 1965, at West Jersey Hospital in Camden, New Jersey, after suffering a heart attack at Garden State Park Racetrack shortly after he had saddled Our Michael to run in the Garden State Stakes.
