= Timely Writer =

Thoroughbred racehorse

- Sire: Staff Writer
- Grandsire: Northern Dancer
- Dam: Timely Roman
- Damsire: Sette Bello
- Sex: Stallion
- Foaled: April 21, 1979
- Died: October 9, 1982
- Country: United States
- Colour: Bay
- Breeder: Dorothy Davis
- Owner: Peter and Francis Martin
- Trainer: Dominic Imprescia
- Record: 15: 9-1-2
- Earnings: $605,491

Major wins
- Mayflower Stakes (1981); Hopeful Stakes (1981); Champagne Stakes (1981); Flamingo Stakes (1982); Florida Derby (1982); Yankee Handicap (1982)

Honours
- Timely Writer Stakes at Gulfstream Park
- Last updated on February 25, 2011

Timely Writer (April 21, 1979 – October 9, 1982) was an American Thoroughbred racehorse. The Boston Globe once described him as "the horse with the greatest potential—and the worst luck—whose very story was a fairytale of racing history."

== Background ==
Timely Writer was foaled on April 21, 1979, in Florida. By Staff Writer and out of the broodmare Timely Roman, his bloodlines included Northern Dancer, Swaps, Tim Tam, Ribot, Tom Fool, and Count Fleet. He was purchased for $13,500 by Peter and Francis Martin, owners of a meat-packing plant in Boston, Massachusetts, and trained by local trainer Dominic Imprescia.

== Racing career ==
As a two-year-old, Timely Writer began his career in 1981 as a claimer at Monmouth Park, winning by eight lengths and tying a track record. The colt entered stakes company off of that effort, taking the Mayflower Stakes at Suffolk Downs. With two career victories from two starts, he made his next start in the Grade 2 Saratoga Special at Saratoga Race Course, finishing third. He followed that effort with a stakes record-tying performance in the Grade 1 Hopeful Stakes over the same surface, matching the time of 1:16.2 for the 6 1/2 furlongs set by 1973 Triple Crown winner Secretariat, and less than a second off the course record set by 1977 Triple Crown winner Affirmed. He closed his two-year-old campaign at Belmont Park with a third-place finish in the Grade 1 Futurity Stakes, a second in the Grade 2 Cowdin Stakes, and a victory in the prestigious Grade I Champagne Stakes, in which he overtook 4-5 favorite Deputy Minister, surging down the stretch and winning by nearly five lengths. In a controversial decision, Timely Writer was passed over in favor of Deputy Minister as the 1981 Eclipse Award as champion two-year-old colt. Timely Writer and Deputy Minster were installed as co-highweights at 126 pounds in the 1981 Experimental Free Handicap.

At the start of the 1982 three-year-old racing season, key wins in March and April in the Flamingo Stakes and Florida Derby established Timely Writer as the prohibitive favorite for the Triple Crown of Thoroughbred Racing. It had been announced after the Flamingo Stakes that veterinarian Dr. William Reed had purchased 50% of the colt's breeding rights for $3 million. However, a life-threatening case of colic at Churchill Downs in Kentucky sidelined him ten days prior to the Kentucky Derby. With only a 50% chance of surviving surgery, Timely Writer recovered and endured a months-long rehabilitation program. He made his return to racing on August 14, 1982, at Suffolk Downs, winning the Yankee Handicap. That victory was followed by a return to Saratoga Race Course in allowance company before an unsuccessful bid in the Marlboro Cup Invitational Handicap at Belmont Park. He rebounded from that effort with an easy win in a handicap race a week prior to a scheduled start in the Jockey Club Gold Cup.

Timely Writer was installed as the 2-1 morning line favorite for that race, which was to be his final start before retirement to stud. He was unleashing his signature come-from-behind move with 1/2 mile left to race under jockey Jeffrey Fell when suddenly the horse's left foreleg broke. He fell to the ground, with three other horses stumbling over him. With no possibility of repairing his leg, Timely Writer was humanely euthanized. Another colt, Johnny Dance, who had collided with his fallen foe, suffered the same fate.

Author Kimberly Gatto in her 2011 book "Saratoga Race Course: The August place to Be," best summed up the extent of Timely Writer's tremendous popularity across the county, both during and after his racing career, observing, "Timely Writer had an 'everyman' quality that reminded folks of Seabiscuit."

In 2024, the son-in-law of Francis X. Martin, Michael A. Bergeron, and his son, John F. Martin, released "The Ride of Their Lives: The Untold Story of Legendary Timely Writer & the Martin Family." See www.therideoftheirlives.com

== Honors ==
Timely Writer was buried in the grass infield at the head of the stretch at Belmont Park, becoming one of only two thoroughbreds the New York Racing Association has granted such an honor. In August 2023, due to construction of a new synthetic track at Belmont, Timely Writer's remains were exhumed and reburied at Old Friends Farm in Kentucky.

He was named Florida-bred Two-Year Old Horse of the Year in 1981. That same year, he was selected by the New England Turf Writers Association as the 1981 Horse of the Year and the Champion Two-Year-Old Colt.

A tribute to Timely Writer is included in the book "Beyond the Rainbow Bridge", by Kimberly Gatto (2005, Half Halt Press) ISBN 0-939481-71-5. Blood-Horse magazine also printed a twenty-five-year anniversary tribute article in its September 29, 2007 issue.

The New England Turf Writers Association enshrined Timely Writer in the N.E. Horse Racing Hall of Fame in 2008.

In March 2011 Gulfstream Park ran the first Timely Writer Stakes in his honor. The race for three-year-olds was won that year by Uncle Mo, the two-year-old champion of 2010.
