= Thomas J. Barry =

Tom Barry
Personal information
- Born: July 27, 1907 Ireland
- Died: March 1987 (aged 79)
- Occupation: Trainer

Horse racing career
- Sport: Horse racing
- Career wins: Not found

Major racing wins
- Laurel Futurity Stakes (1953); Tyro Stakes (1953); American Derby (1954); Arlington Classic (1954); Leonard Richards Stakes (1958); Peter Pan Stakes (1958); Edgemere Handicap (1963) American Classic Race wins: Belmont Stakes (1958, 1960)

Racing awards
- Leading trainer at Monmouth Park Racetrack (1951)

Significant horses
- Errard King, Cavan, Celtic Ash

Thomas J. Barry (July 27, 1907 – March, 1987) was a trainer of Thoroughbred racehorses who won two American Classic Races with foreign-bred horses. Born in Ireland, as a young man he emigrated to the United States where he became a citizen around 1930.

In 1951 Tom Barry won the training title at Monmouth Park Racetrack in Oceanport, New Jersey which marked the beginning of a decade in which he enjoyed considerable racing success. In 1952, Barry began the race conditioning of a colt named Errard King for owner Joseph Gavegnano. Under regular jockey Sam Boulmetis, Sr., in 1953 the two-year-old Errard King won the Tyro Stakes and the Laurel Futurity Stakes and the following year captured two very important races, the American Derby and Arlington Classic.

== American Classic Races ==
In his only appearance in the Kentucky Derby, in 1956 Tom Barry trained High King to a tenth-place finish. He had two horses run in the Preakness Stakes: Celtic Ash finished third in 1960, and Vimy Ridge earned fourth place in 1962. However, from two entries in the third leg of the U.S. Triple Crown series, the Belmont Stakes, Tom Barry's horses won both. For owner Joseph E. O'Connell, a banker from Boston, Massachusetts, Barry used his knowledge of the Irish Thoroughbred industry and had O'Connell buy Cavan in the belief that the Irish-born colt was genetically suited to run its best at longer distances. Barry proved correct as the colt won the 1958 Belmont Stakes, at a mile and a half, the longest of the U.S. Triple Crown races. In winning, Cavan spoiled Kentucky Derby and Preakness Stakes winner Tim Tam's bid to capture the Triple Crown. Two years later in 1960, Tom Barry and Joseph O'Connell's Green Dunes Farm did the same thing when they purchased the British-bred colt Celtic Ash in Ireland. Bought for $22,000, in the United States Celtic Ash earned more than $130,000. In the 1 3/16 mile Preakness Stakes of 1960, Celtic Ash finished third but then won the much longer Belmont Stakes.

Tom Barry owned Ardmore Farm in Darlington, Maryland where he was living at the time of his death in 1987. The property was purchased from his Estate by Audrey and Allen Murray who renamed it Murmur Farm.
