= Athens Wood =

Irish-bred Thoroughbred racehorse

- Sire: Celtic Ash
- Grandsire: Sicambre
- Dam: Belle of Athens
- Damsire: Acropolis
- Sex: Stallion
- Foaled: 1968
- Country: Ireland
- Colour: Bay
- Breeder: Kilcarn Stud
- Owner: Eileen Rogerson
- Trainer: Harry Thomson Jones
- Record: 12: 8-0-1
- Earnings: not found

Major wins
- Solario Stakes (1970); Gordon Stakes (1971); Great Voltigeur Stakes (1971); British Classic Race wins: St. Leger Stakes (1971)

Athens Wood (foaled 1968 in Ireland) was a Thoroughbred racehorse best known for winning a British Classic, the St. Leger Stakes.

== Background ==
Athens Wood was bred by Kilcarn Stud near Navan in County Meath, Ireland. His sire was Celtic Ash, a British-born colt who raced in the United States where in 1960 he won an American Classic, the Belmont Stakes. Grandsire, Sicambre, was the Leading sire in France in 1966. His dam was Belle of Athens, a daughter of the Countess of Derby's multiple stakes winner, Acropolis.

He was owned and raced by Eileen Joel Rogerson, the daughter of prominent financier and racing stable owner, Solomon Joel. He was trained by Tom Jones,

== Racing career ==
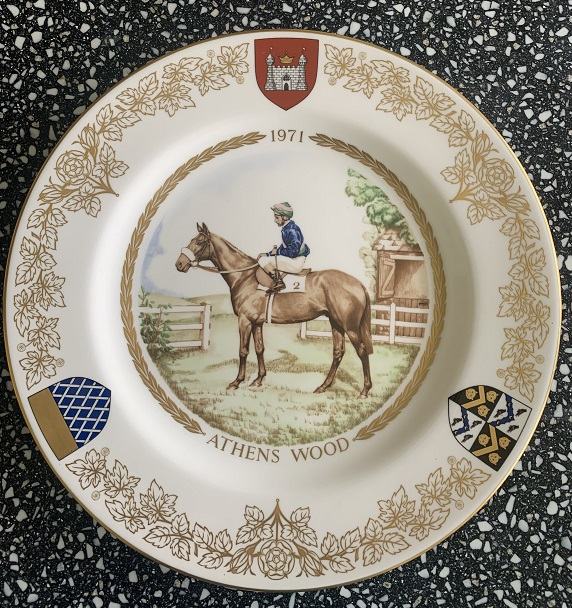
Spode plate by Francis Sinclair Ltd depicting winner of the St Leger, Athens Wood ridden by Lester Piggott

Athens Wood made his racing debut as a two-year-old in July 1970. He won three starts in England including the Solario Stakes then was sent to France to compete where he ran sixth in a Grade II event at Maisons-Laffitte Racecourse.

Ridden by Greville Starkey, Athens Wood made a winning debut as a three-year-old on June 4. 1971 then won his next start at Epsom Downs Racecourse before finishing third to winner Homeric in the Lingfield Derby Trial. In July he won the Gordon Stakes at Goodwood Racecourse and then in August captured the Great Voltigeur Stakes at York Racecourse. In September, Athens Wood won the most important race of his career at Doncaster Racecourse when Lester Piggott rode him to victory in the Classic St. Leger Stakes.

As a four-year-old, Athens Wood made two starts at Longchamp Racecourse in Paris in 1972, both times finishing unplaced.

== Stud record ==
Retired to stud, Athens Wood stood in England in 1973 and part of 1974 before being shipped to breeders in Russia. Among his Russian progeny, he sired the 1980, 1981, and 1985 winner of the Bolszoj Vserossijskij Priz (Russian Derby) as well as the winner of the 1981 Russian Oaks.
