= United States Champion Jockey by wins =

There is no formal championship award given to the jockey who won the most races in United States Thoroughbred racing. However, it is a prestigious accomplishment always on any jockey's résumé and widely reported on by the various media.

== Milestones ==
- In 1952, Anthony DeSpirito won 390 races, breaking Walter Miller's forty-six-year-old record of 388.
- On December 15, 1973, Sandy Hawley became the first jockey in history to win 500 races in a single year.
- In 1989, Kent Desormeaux set the current record for wins in a single calendar year with 598.
- With ten championships, Russell Baze has won the title more than any other jockey.

Champions since 1884
Year – Jockey – Wins

2024	Irad Ortiz Jr.	327
2023	Irad Ortiz Jr.	366
2022	Irad Ortiz Jr.	325
2021	Irad Ortiz Jr.	336
2020	Irad Ortiz Jr.	300
2019	Irad Ortiz Jr.	324
2018	Irad Ortiz Jr.	346
2017	Irad Ortiz Jr.	318
2016	José Ortiz	351
2015	Javier Castellano	344
2014	Russell Baze	324
2013	Javier Castellano	362
2012	Russell Baze	374
2011	Deshawn Parker	400
2010	Deshawn Parker	377
2009	Russell Baze	415
2008	Russell Baze	403
2007	Russell Baze	398
2006	Julien Leparoux	403
2005	Russell Baze	375
2004	Rafael Bejarano	455
2003	Ramon Domínguez	453
2002	Russell Baze	431
2001	Ramon Domínguez	431
2000	Russell Baze	412
1999	Edgar Prado	402
1998	Edgar Prado	470
1997	Edgar Prado	536
1996	Russell Baze	415
1995	Russell Baze	448
1994	Russell Baze	415
1993	Russell Baze	410
1992	Russell Baze	433
1991	Pat Day	430
1990	Pat Day	364
1989	Kent Desormeaux	598
1988	Kent Desormeaux	474
1987	Kent Desormeaux	450
1986	Pat Day	429
1985	Chris Antley	469
1984	Pat Day	399
1983	Pat Day	454
1982	Pat Day	399
1981	David Gall	376
1980	Chris McCarron	405
1979	David Gall	479
1978	Eddie Delahoussaye	384
1977	Steve Cauthen	487
1976	Sandy Hawley	413
1975	Chris McCarron	465
1974	Chris McCarron	546
1973	Sandy Hawley	515
1972	Sandy Hawley	367
1971	Laffit Pincay Jr.	380
1970	Sandy Hawley	452
1969	Larry Snyder	352
1968	Ángel Cordero Jr.	345
1967	Jorge Velásquez	438
1966	Avelino Gomez	318
1965	Jesse Davidson	319
1964	Walter Blum	324
1963	Walter Blum	360
1962	Ronnie Ferraro	352
1961	Johnny Sellers	328
1960	Bill Hartack	307
1959	John Adams	347
1958	John Adams	300
1957	Bill Hartack	341
1956	Bill Hartack	347
1955	Bill Hartack	417
1954	John Adams	380
1953	John Adams	485
1952	Anthony DeSpirito	390
1951	Charlie Burr	310
1950	Joe Culmone (tie)	388
1950	Bill Shoemaker (tie)	388
1949	Gordon Glisson	270
1948	Johnny Longden	319
1947	Johnny Longden	316
1946	Ted Atkinson	233
1945	Job Dean Jessop	290
1944	Ted Atkinson	287
1943	John Adams	228
1942	John Adams	245
1941	Don Meade	210
1940	Earl Dew	287
1939	Don Meade	255
1938	Johnny Longden	236
1937	John Adams	260
1936	Basil James	245
1935	Charley Stevenson	206
1934	Maurice Peters	221
1933	Jack Westrope	301
1932	John Gilbert	212
1931	Harry Roble	173
1930	Raymond Workman	151
1929	Melvin Knight	142
1928	Joe Inzelone	155
1927	Lee Hardy	207
1926	Robert Jones	190
1925	Arthur Mortensen	187
1924	Ivan Parke	205
1923	Ivan Parke	173
1922	Mark Fator	188
1921	Chick Lang	135
1920	James Butwell	152
1919	Cliff Robinson	190
1918	Frank Robinson	185
1917	Willie Crump	151
1916	Frank Robinson	178
1915	Mack Garner	151
1914	John McTaggart	157
1913	Merritt Buxton	146
1912	Pete Hill	168
1911	Ted Koerner	162
1910	Guy Garner	200
1909	Vincent Powers	173
1908	Vincent Powers	324
1907	Walter Miller	334
1906	Walter Miller	388
1905	David Nicol	221
1904	Gene Hildebrand	297
1903	Grover Fuller	229
1902	Jerry Rausch *	276
1901	Winfield O'Connor	253
1900	Carl Mitchell	195
1899	Tommy Burns	273
1898	Tommy Burns	277
1897	H. Martin	173
1896	Joseph Scherrer	271
1895	James Perkins	192
1894	Willie Simms	228
1893	not yet found
1892	not yet found
1891	not yet found
1890	Marty Bergen
1889	Shelby Barnes
1888	Shelby Barnes
1887	Jim McLaughlin
1886	Jim McLaughlin
1885	Jim McLaughlin
1884	Jim McLaughlin

- *Often recorded misspelled as "Ranch"

== See also ==
- United States Champion Jockey by earnings
