= Bob DiSpirito =

American football player and coach (1928–2015)

Biographical details
- Born: August 9, 1928; Woonsocket, Rhode Island, U.S.
- Died: December 21, 2015 (aged 87); Butler, Pennsylvania, U.S.

Playing career

Football
- 1950–1953: Rhode Island

Baseball
- c. 1953: Rhode Island
- Positions: Center, guard (football); Catcher (baseball)

Coaching career (HC unless noted)

Football
- 1956: Cheshire Academy (CT) (line)
- 1957: Cheshire Academy (CT)
- 1958–1959: Bridgeport (assistant)
- 1960–1964: Bridgeport
- 1965–1966: Bucknell (line)
- 1967–1980: Slippery Rock
- 1987: Slippery Rock (interim HC)

Baseball
- c. 1957: Cheshire Academy (CT)
- 1959–1964: Bridgeport

Head coaching record
- Overall: 97–82–4 (college football); 56–48 (college baseball)
- Bowls: 0–1
- Tournaments: Football; 0–1 (NCAA D-III playoffs)

Accomplishments and honors

Championships
- Football; 3 PSAC (1972–1974); 4 PSAC West Division (1972–1974, 1976)

Robert George DiSpirito Sr. (August 9, 1928 – December 21, 2015) was an American college football and college baseball player and coach. He served as the head football coach at the University of Bridgeport from 1960 to 1964. DiSpirito was the head football coach at Slippery Rock University of Pennsylvania from 1967 to 1980 and again on an interim basis during the 1987 seasons. He played football at the University of Rhode Island, lettering in 1950.

DiSpirito was also the head baseball coach at Bridgeport from 1959 to 1964, tallying a mark of 56–48 in six seasons. He left Bridgeport in 1965 to become an assistant football coach at Bucknell University.

== Head coaching record ==
=== College football ===
Year	Team	Overall	Conference	Standing	Bowl/playoffs	AP^{#}
Bridgeport Purple Knights (NCAA College Division independent) (1960–1964)
1960	Bridgeport	4–2–1				
1961	Bridgeport	4–5				
1962	Bridgeport	5–4				
1963	Bridgeport	4–5				
1964	Bridgeport	1–6				
Bridgeport:		18–22–1				
Slippery Rock Rockets (Pennsylvania State College Athletic Conference / Pennsylvania State Athletic Conference) (1967–1980)
1967	Slippery Rock	2–7	0–5	6th (West)		
1968	Slippery Rock	3–6	2–3	4th (West)		
1969	Slippery Rock	6–3	3–2	2nd (West)		
1970	Slippery Rock	4–5	2–3	T–4th (West)		
1971	Slippery Rock	7–2	4–1	2nd (West)		
1972	Slippery Rock	8–2–1	4–0–1	1st (West)	L Knute Rockne Bowl	
1973	Slippery Rock	8–2	5–0	1st (West)		
1974	Slippery Rock	9–1–1	5–0–1	1st (West)	L NCAA Division III Semifinal	13
1975	Slippery Rock	4–5	3–3	T–4th (West)		
1976	Slippery Rock	7–3	5–1	T–1st (West)		
1977	Slippery Rock	4–4–1	3–2–1	3rd (West)		
1978	Slippery Rock	6–3	4–2	3rd (West)		
1979	Slippery Rock	3–6	2–4	T–4th (West)		
1980	Slippery Rock	4–5	3–3	T–4th (West)		
Slippery Rock Rockets (Pennsylvania State Athletic Conference) (1987)
1987	Slippery Rock	4–6	3–3	T–3rd (West)		
Slippery Rock:		79–60–3	48–32–3			
Total:		97–82–4				
