= Anthony DeSpirito =

American Thoroughbred horse racing jockey

- DeSpirito in 1953

Personal information
- Nickname: Hard Luck Kid
- Born: December 24, 1935 Lawrence, Massachusetts, U.S.
- Died: May 26, 1975 (aged 39) Riverside, Rhode Island, U.S.
- Occupation: Jockey

Horse racing career
- Sport: Horse racing
- Career wins: Not found

Major racing wins
- Narragansett Special (1953); Kentucky Oaks (1954); Adirondack Stakes (1955); Metropolitan Handicap (1955); Schuylerville Stakes (1955); Bowie Handicap (1956); National Stallion Stakes (filly division) (1967); Bewitch Stakes (1972)

Racing awards
- United States Champion Jockey by wins (1952)

Honours
- Tony DeSpirito Memorial at Rockingham Park; Tony DeSpirito Stakes at Suffolk Downs

Significant horses
- High Gun
- Updated on July 3, 2011

Anthony DeSpirito (December 24, 1935 – May 26, 1975) was an American Thoroughbred horse racing jockey who found instant fame when he won the national riding title in 1952 as an apprentice in his first full year of racing.

== Biography ==
Born in Lawrence, Massachusetts, "Tony" DeSpirito was the son of a millworker. He left school at an early age to work as an exercise rider at Rockingham Park in Salem, New Hampshire. There are conflicting newspaper reports of his birth year, but the Social Security Death Index records him as being born in 1935. DeSpirito rode his first race as an apprentice jockey in 1951 at Narragansett Park in Pawtucket, Rhode Island.

In 1952, DeSpirito began his record-setting year well behind other American jockeys in races won, as he did not get his first win until January 22 at Sunshine Park in Oldsmar, Florida. He then began winning at a tremendous pace and had several racedays with multiple victories. During the week of June 6–13, three times Despirito rode four winners on a single racecard at Suffolk Downs in Massachusetts. At Rockingham Park, he rode six winners on August 21, 1952, and won six races again at Rockingham on October 10, 1953. On November 29, 1952, he rode five winners on a single card at Lincoln Downs in Rhode Island. By December, he was in a position to challenge the world record for wins in a year. That month, he rode in Florida; when the tracks there closed on Sunday, he flew to Cuba and won three races on December 28 at Oriental Park Racetrack in Havana. On December 30, 1952, he rode his 389th winner at Tropical Park Race Track in Coral Gables, Florida, breaking the record for most wins in a single year set by Walter Miller in 1906. DeSpirito ended the year with 390 wins from 1,474 mounts, a 26% win rate. On the last day of the year, he was flown from Miami to New York so that he could appear on CBS's Toast of the Town with Ed Sullivan. DeSpirito was voted the Hickok Pro Athlete of the Month for November and December, and finished second to Rocky Marciano for the annual award (the Hickok Belt).

In 1953, DeSpirito continued his winning ways but was involved in the first of four serious accidents that profoundly affected his career and saw the media dub him the "Hard Luck Kid". Despite time lost as a result of his 1953 accident, he finished the year with 311 wins, but was well behind Bill Shoemaker, who smashed DeSpirito's record with 485 wins.

DeSpirito won the 1954 Kentucky Oaks aboard the Maine Chance Farm filly Fascinator. In his only Kentucky Derby appearance, he finished 13th in the 1954 edition aboard the Maine Chance colt Black Metal. During 1954, DeSpirito battled with riding greats Avelino Gomez and Bill Shoemaker for top jockey honors in the United States and by July 10 had taken over the lead with 176 wins. However, in August, Shoemaker took the lead and maintained it for the rest of the year; DeSpirito finished fourth.

On May 14, 1955, DeSpirito rode High Gun to victory in the Metropolitan Handicap at Belmont Park. Four months later, on September 18, DeSpirito suffered a traumatic brain injury in a racing accident at Aqueduct Racetrack in Queens, New York. He returned to racing in January 1956; in May, he was hurt again in an accident at Laurel Park Racecourse in Maryland and had to undergo surgery to remove a damaged kidney and spleen.

DeSpirito rode in the Preakness Stakes twice. In the 1958 edition, he finished last in a field of 12 horses riding Liberty Ruler. In the 1960 edition, he finished second in a field of six aboard future Canadian Horse Racing Hall of Fame colt Victoria Park.

On June 30, 1960, DeSpirito came close to losing his life in a racing mishap at Suffolk Downs. After being knocked off his saddle in the first turn, he was left dangling from one stirrup and clinging to the horse's neck. Fellow jockey Henry Wajda rode up beside DeSpirito's horse and reached over with his left hand to lift him back up into the saddle. The Jockeys' Guild described it as "one of the most heroic feats ever seen in American racing history."

DeSpirito briefly left racing in 1964 to work in real estate in Florida. After 18 months, he resumed riding, which he continued as late as April 1973. He announced his retirement in late May 1973 to take a position as a track judge at Narragansett Park. Over the course of his racing career, DeSpirito rode in 37 "major" North American races, registering two wins (1954 Kentucky Oaks, 1955 Metropolitan Handicap), eleven second-place finishes, and seven third-place finishes.

DeSpirito married Doris De Christoforo in a church ceremony in Revere, Massachusetts, on November 1, 1953; their wedding was attended by Nelson Eddy. A son, Mark, was born circa 1960. DeSpirito was found dead in his apartment in Riverside, Rhode Island, on May 26, 1975, aged 39. Police ruled out foul play, and the coroner's report found he had choked to death. In 1977, Bill Shoemaker commented that DeSpirito "had more natural ability than any rider I've ever seen and he knew what to do with it." An annual memorial race named for DeSpirito was first run at Rockingham Park and later at Suffolk Downs.
