= Barbaro Stakes at Delaware Park =

Barbaro Stakes
- Class: Ungraded stakes
- Location: Delaware Park Racetrack; Stanton, Delaware, United States
- Race type: Thoroughbred - Flat racing
- Website: www.delawarepark.com

Race information
- Distance: 1 1/16 miles (8.5 furlongs)
- Surface: Dirt
- Track: left-handed
- Qualification: Three-year-olds
- Weight: Assigned
- Purse: $100,000

The Barbaro Stakes is an American Thoroughbred horse race once run annually in mid July at Delaware Park Racetrack in Stanton, Delaware. It is now run in October.

Previously known as the Leonard Richards Stakes, in 2007 it was renamed in honor of Barbaro, the horse who won the Kentucky Derby in 2006, but eventually died after shattering his leg in that year's Preakness Stakes.

A Grade III race through 2009 but now ungraded, it is open to three-year-old horses running one and one sixteenth mile on the dirt and offers a purse of $100,000. In 2011, the race was run at 1 mile and 70 yards.

There was no race from 1983 through 1996.

== Records ==
Speed record: (since 1997 at current distance of 1 1/16 miles)

- 1:42.41 - Burning Roma (2001)
- Previously the race has been contested at 1 1/8 miles. On June 18, 1960, Victoria Park won the race in a track record time of 1:47.40 for 1 1/8 miles. As at 2020, that record remains intact.

== Winners since 1997 ==
Year	Winner	Jockey	Trainer	Owner	Time
1997	Leestown	Jose Velez, Jr.	D. Wayne Lukas	Not found	1:43.46
1998	Scatmandu	Richard Migliore	John C. Kimmel	Robert Waxman	1:42.43
1999	Stellar Brush	Mike McCarthy	Richard W. Small	Robert E. Meyerhoff	1:42.78
2000	Grundlefoot	Travis Dunkelberger	Gary Capuano	Paul Fowler, Jr.	1:44.04
2001	Burning Roma	Rick Wilson	Anthony Dutrow	Harold Queen	1:42.41
2002	Running Tide	Ramon Dominguez	Rodney Jenkins	On The Run Farm	1:45.10
2003	Awesome Time	Anthony Black	Nick Zito	Robert V. LaPenta	1:43.26
2004	Pollard's Vision	Jerry Bailey	Todd Pletcher	Edgewood Farm	1:43.85
2005	Sun King	Rafael Bejarano	Nick Zito	Tracy Farmer	1:43.33
2006	Awfully Smart	Ramon Dominguez	Alan E. Goldberg	Jayeff B Stables	1:43.23
2007	Xchanger	Edgar Prado	Mark Shuman	Circle Z Stable et al.	1:43.40
2008	Magical Forest	Jorge Chavez	Joseph Demola	Paraneck Stable	1:44.02
2009	Our Edge	Alan Garcia	Nick Zito	Robert LaPenta	1:43.70
2010	Trickmeister	Gabriel Saez	Cindy Jones	Brereton Jones and Timonthy Thornton	1:45.32
2011	Awesome Bet	Kent Desormeaux	Steve Asmussen	Mike McCarty	1:40.37
2012	Stephanoatsee	Sheldon Russell	H. Graham Motion	My Meadowview Farm	1:44.79
2013	Purple Egg	Paco Lopez	Jane Cibelli	Goodwood Racing	1:43.66

== Earlier winners (partial list) ==
- 1948 - Page Boots
- 1949 - Sun Bahram
- 1950 - Post Card
- 1951 - Hall of Fame
- 1952 - Jampol
- 1953 - Jamie K
- 1954 - Full Flight
- 1955 - Saratoga
- 1956 - Ricci Tavi
- 1957 - Lucky Dip
- 1958 - Cavan
- 1959 - Waltz
- 1960 - Victoria Park
- 1961 - Hitting away
- 1962 - Noble Jay
- 1963 - Crewman
- 1964 - Sheldrake
- 1965 - First Family
- 1966 - Buckpasser
- 1967 - Damascus
- 1968 - Balustrade
- 1969 - North Flight
- 1970 - The Pruner
- 1971 - Gleaming
- 1972 - Floor Show
- 1973 - London Company
- 1974 - Silver Florin
- 1975 - My Friend Gus
- 1976 - Cinteelo
- 1977 - True Colors
- 1978 - Mac Diarmida
- 1979 - Lucys Axe
- 1980 - Proctor
- 1981 - Sportin Life
- 1982 - Northrop
