= 1960 Grand National =

English steeplechase horse race

- Grand National
- Location: Aintree Racecourse
- Date: 26 March 1960
- Winning horse: (Scotland) Merryman II
- Starting price: 13/2 F
- Jockey: (England) Gerry Scott
- Trainer: (England) Neville Crump
- Owner: Miss. Winifred H. Wallace
- Conditions: Good

External videos
- BBC coverage in full
- Highlights of the 1960 Grand National (British Pathé)

The 1960 Grand National was the 114th renewal of the Grand National horse race that took place at Aintree Racecourse near Liverpool, England, on 26 March 1960. The steeplechase was won by nine-year-old Merryman II, who, at odds of 13/2, became the first clear favourite to win for 33 years. His jockey, 22-year-old Gerry Scott, had been lucky to take part in the race, having broken his collarbone two weeks earlier. Merryman II became the first ever Scottish winner of the National.

The top weight was officially reduced to a maximum of 12 stone from 12 stone 7 lbs, though it had been over a decade since any horse had been asked to shoulder such a burden.

This was the first Grand National to be televised.

== Finishing order ==
Position	Name	Jockey	Age	Handicap (st-lb)	SP	Distance
01	Merryman II	Gerry Scott	9	10-12	13/2 F	
02	Badanloch	Stan Mellor	9	10-9	100/7	
03	Clear Profit	Jumbo Wilkinson	10	10-1	20/1	
04	Tea Fiend	Gerry Madden	11	10-0	33/1	
05	Sabaria	Mick Roberts	9	10-3	66/1	
06	Green Drill	George Milburn	10	10-3	33/1	
07	Arles	Tony Moule	8	10-4	45/1	
08	Skatealong	Ron Harrison	12	10-0	66/1	

== Non-finishers ==
Fence	Name	Jockey	Age	Handicap (st-lb)	SP	Fate
22	Mr. What	Arthur Freeman	10	11-11	18/1	Fell
06	Wyndburgh	Michael Scudamore	10	11-7	8/1	Unseated Rider
08	Dandy Scot	Fred Winter	10	11-7	10/1	Fell
15	Holly Bank	Peter Brookshaw	13	10-12	50/1	Fell
28	Clanyon	Taffy Jenkins	12	10-8	50/1	Fell
06	Knoxtown	Eddie Harty	10	10-5	45/1	Fell
20	Skipper Jack	Dan O'Donovan	8	10-4	66/1	Fell
22	Pendle Lady	Maurice Towers	10	10-4	40/1	Fell
09	Jonjo	Pat Taaffe	10	10-4	50/1	Fell
15	Uncle Whiskers	Cathal Finnegan	8	10-1	50/1	Fell
15	Belsize II	Paddy Shortt	11	10-0	66/1	Refused
01	Lotoray	Michael Batchelor	10	10-6	66/1	Fell
22	Aliform	Anthony Biddlecombe	8	10-0	45/1	Fell
18	Irish Coffee	William St George Burke	10	10-11	66/1	Pulled Up
08	Clover Bud	Toss Taaffe	10	10-1	20/1	Pulled Up
29	Eagle Lodge	Bill Rees	11	10-1	45/1	Pulled Up
22	Team Spirit	Willie Robinson	8	10-12	9/1	Unseated Rider
22	Cannobie Lee	David Nicholson	9	10-7	100/9	Refused

== Media coverage and aftermath ==
This was the first year that the National was broadcast live on television. The presenter, Cliff Michelmore, who stepped in at the last minute for David Coleman, who was suffering from appendicitis, told viewers they were witnessing television history. The BBC deployed 16 cameras to Aintree, with Peter O'Sullevan (who had covered the race on radio since 1947) commentating on his first of 38 televised Grand Nationals. O'Sullevan later described his nervousness at commentating on the famous race for the first time on television, his nerves amplified by a restricted view and an unreliable monitor.

Co-commentator Peter Bromley recalled, "They had built an enormous tower in the middle of the course so that we could see the majority of the action. It was so huge that the thing was swaying and I felt most unsafe. Conversely the view was excellent and having told a few chums of my position for the Foxhunters Chase two days before the National, I found the late Ryan Price's wife, Dorothy and Fred Winter's wife Di, as guests for the big race. Fred was riding Dandy Scot for Ryan and the ladies thought they would take advantage of the unique viewing position. I applauded them for even managing to climb the endless and precarious ladders up the side of the scaffolding. A further surprise almost made me drop my binoculars when Fred, who had fallen at the Canal Turn, joined us in the crows nest and the first I knew of his presence was when he tapped me on the shoulder while I was commentating and said 'Watcha Cock!"
