= Merryman II =

Scottish-bred Thoroughbred racehorsee

- Sire: Carnival Boy
- Dam: Maid Marion
- Damsire: Star and Garter
- Sex: Gelding
- Foaled: 1951
- Country: Scotland
- Colour: Bay
- Owner: Winifred H. Wallace
- Trainer: Neville Crump

Major wins
- Grand National (1960)

Merryman II (foaled 1951) was a Scottish-bred Thoroughbred racehorse who competed in National Hunt racing.

He is best known for winning the 1960 Grand National at odds of 13/2, making him the first clear favourite to win for 33 years as well as the first Scottish-bred winner.

His jockey, 22-year-old Gerry Scott, had been lucky to take part in the race, having broken his collarbone two weeks prior.

Due to the 1960 race being the first ever televised, Merryman II also holds the distinction of being the first televised winner of a Grand National.

== Grand National record ==
Grand National	Position	Jockey	Age	Weight	SP	Distance
1960	1st	Gerry Scott	9	10-12	13/2 F	
1961	2nd	Bobby Beasley	10	11-12	8/1	
1962	13th	David Dick	11	11-8	20/1	

== Pedigree ==
Pedigree of Merryman II (SCO), bay gelding, 1951
Sire Carnival Boy (GB) 1941	Colombo (GB); 1931	Manna (IRE)	Phalaris (GB)
Sire Carnival Boy (GB) 1941	Colombo (GB); 1931	Manna (IRE)	Waffles (IRE)
Sire Carnival Boy (GB) 1941	Colombo (GB); 1931	Lady Nairne (GB)	Chaucer (GB)
Sire Carnival Boy (GB) 1941	Colombo (GB); 1931	Lady Nairne (GB)	Lammarmuir (GB)
Sire Carnival Boy (GB) 1941	Sharp Tar (GE); 1933	Son-in-law (GB)	Dark Ronaldo (IRE)
Sire Carnival Boy (GB) 1941	Sharp Tar (GE); 1933	Son-in-law (GB)	Mother In Law (GB)
Sire Carnival Boy (GB) 1941	Sharp Tar (GE); 1933	Saddle Tor (GB)	Hurry On (GB)
Sire Carnival Boy (GB) 1941	Sharp Tar (GE); 1933	Saddle Tor (GB)	Leighon Tor (IRE)
Dam Maid Marion (GB) 1937	Star and Garter (IRE); 1919	Sunstar (GB)	Sundridge (GB)
Dam Maid Marion (GB) 1937	Star and Garter (IRE); 1919	Sunstar (GB)	Doris (GB)
Dam Maid Marion (GB) 1937	Star and Garter (IRE); 1919	She (GB)	Cyllene (GB)
Dam Maid Marion (GB) 1937	Star and Garter (IRE); 1919	She (GB)	Witty Girl (GB)
Dam Maid Marion (GB) 1937	Angelica (IRE); 191)9	Santair (GB)	Sanoi (GB)
Dam Maid Marion (GB) 1937	Angelica (IRE); 191)9	Santair (GB)	Helen Blair (IRE)
Dam Maid Marion (GB) 1937	Angelica (IRE); 191)9	Angela II (GB)	Wales (GB)
Dam Maid Marion (GB) 1937	Angelica (IRE); 191)9	Angela II (GB)	Angela (GB)
