= Victoria Park (horse) =

Canadian Thoroughbred racehorse

- Sire: Chop Chop
- Grandsire: Flares
- Dam: Victoriana
- Damsire: Windfields
- Sex: Stallion
- Foaled: 1957
- Country: Canada
- Colour: Bay
- Breeder: Edward P. Taylor
- Owner: Windfields Farm
- Trainer: Horatio Luro
- Record: 19: 10-4-2
- Earnings: $250,076

Major wins
- Clarendon Stakes (1959); Cup and Saucer Stakes (1959); Coronation Futurity Stakes (1959); Remsen Stakes (1959); Leonard Richards Stakes (1960) Canadian Triple Crown wins: Queen's Plate (1960) American Classic Race placing: Preakness Stakes 2nd (1960)

Awards
- Canadian Champion 2-Yr-Old Colt (1959); Canadian Champion 3-Yr-Old Colt (1960); Canadian Horse of the Year (1960); Leading broodmare sire in Great Britain & Ireland (1977)

Honours
- Canadian Horse Racing Hall of Fame (1976); Victoria Park Stakes at Woodbine Racetrack
- Last updated on March 20, 2020

Victoria Park (1957–1985) was a Canadian Thoroughbred racehorse. He was the first Canadian-bred horse to place in an American Triple Crown race.

== Background ==
Victoria Park was a bay horse bred and raced by E. P. Taylor, at his Windfields Farm in Oshawa, Ontario.

== Racing career ==
At age two, the colt won the Clarendon Stakes plus the two richest 2-year-old races in Canada, the Coronation Futurity Stakes and Cup and Saucer Stakes, and was voted Canadian Champion 2-Yr-Old Colt.

In the 1960 Kentucky Derby, Victoria Park was ridden by Manuel Ycaza and finished third behind winner Venetian Way and Bally Ache. In the 1960 Preakness Stakes, ridden by Anthony DeSpirito, he ran second to Bally Ache, whom he had previously beaten in the Leonard Richards Stakes while setting a new Delaware Park track record. Victoria Park still holds the Delaware Park track record he set on June 18, 1960, of 1:47 4/5 for one and an eighth miles (1.8 km) on dirt.

Owner E. P. Taylor chose to bypass the Belmont Stakes to return for Canada's most important race, the Queen's Plate. Victoria Park won that race in a record time that stood for more than 40 years. He was voted 1960's Canadian Champion Three-Year-Old Male Horse and Canadian Horse of the Year.

== Stud record ==
Retired to stud, Victoria Park sired 25 stakes winners, including three Queen's Plate winners: Almoner (1970), Kennedy Road (1971), and Victoria Song (1972). He is the damsire of The Minstrel as well as the damsire of Northern Taste, who led the Japanese leading sires list for ten years, and topped the broodmare sires list a number of times.

On its formation in 1976, Victoria Park was inducted into the Canadian Horse Racing Hall of Fame.

== Pedigree ==
Pedigree of Victoria Park, bay colt, 1957
Sire Chop Chop	Flares	Gallant Fox	Sir Gallahad
Sire Chop Chop	Flares	Gallant Fox	Marguerite
Sire Chop Chop	Flares	Flambino	Wrack
Sire Chop Chop	Flares	Flambino	Flambette
Sire Chop Chop	Sceptical	Buchan	Sunstar
Sire Chop Chop	Sceptical	Buchan	Hamoaze
Sire Chop Chop	Sceptical	Clodagh	Tredennis
Sire Chop Chop	Sceptical	Clodagh	Clare
Dam Victoriana	Windfields	Bunty Lawless	Ladder
Dam Victoriana	Windfields	Bunty Lawless	Mintwina
Dam Victoriana	Windfields	Nandi	Stimulus
Dam Victoriana	Windfields	Nandi	Golden Feast
Dam Victoriana	Iribelle	Osiris	Papyrus
Dam Victoriana	Iribelle	Osiris	Most Beautiful
Dam Victoriana	Iribelle	Belmona	King James
Dam Victoriana	Iribelle	Belmona	Belmon (family: 1-h)
