= Celtic Ash =

English-bred Thoroughbred racehorse

- Sire: Sicambre
- Grandsire: Prince Bio
- Dam: Ash Plant
- Damsire: Nepenthe
- Sex: Stallion
- Foaled: 1957
- Country: Great Britain
- Colour: Bay
- Breeder: Lord Harrington
- Owner: Joseph E. O'Connell
- Trainer: Thomas J. Barry
- Rider: Bill Hartack
- Record: 9: 3-1-3
- Earnings: $130,065

Major wins
- Triple Crown race wins: Belmont Stakes (1960)

Celtic Ash (1957–1978) was an English-bred Thoroughbred racehorse raised in Ireland who is best known for winning the 1960 Belmont Stakes.

== Background ==
Celtic Ash was a bay horse bred by Lord Harrington. He was out of the mare Ash Plant and sired by Sicambre, the Leading sire in France in 1966. On the advice of Irish-born trainer Tom Barry, Celtic Ash was purchased by Boston, Massachusetts banker Joseph E. O'Connell, who imported him to the United States to race for his Green Dunes Farm.

== Racing career ==
At age two, Celtic Ash made three starts without winning, then at three made a total of six starts. He was not entered in the Kentucky Derby but won two minor races at Laurel Park Racecourse, in one of which he set a new track record time for one mile. He was then entered in the May 14, 1960, Preakness Stakes, the second leg of the U.S. Triple Crown series. Under jockey Sam Boulmetis, longshot Celtic Ash finished third behind runner-up Victoria Park and winner Bally Ache.

Unlike today, the $100,000 added Jersey Derby at Monmouth Park Racetrack was run between the Preakness and the third leg of the U.S. Triple Crown. The New Jersey race regularly drew the top three-year-olds and more than 50,000 fans attended on Memorial Day 1960 to see Celtic Ash, under future U.S. Racing Hall of Fame jockey Bill Hartack, finish third behind Bally Ache and Tompion. Hartack had ridden Venetian Way to victory in the Kentucky Derby but had been criticized for his ride on the colt after he finished fifth in the Preakness Stakes. After the Jersey Derby, Hartack accepted trainer Tom Barry's offer to ride Celtic Ash again in the upcoming Belmont Stakes.

=== 1960 Belmont stakes ===
The day prior to the Belmont Stakes, betting favorite Bally Ache came up lame and was withdrawn from the 1½ mile third leg of the Triple Crown. His absence left Venetian Way ridden by Eddie Arcaro, as the favorite. However, winning the Belmont Stakes with an underdog was nothing new for Celtic Ash's owner, Joseph O'Connell. Two years earlier in 1958, he and trainer Tom Barry won the Classic with the lightly raced Irish-bred colt Cavan. On June 11, 1960, O'Connell was in a Brighton, Massachusetts, hospital and watched on television as Hartack brought his colt from last place to overtake Venetian Way in the stretch, then pull away to win easily by five and a half lengths. O'Connell did not recover from his illness and died less than a month later.

== Stud record ==
Retired to stud duty, Celtic Ash stood in the United States from 1962 through 1964. He was then sent to Great Britain, where he stood until 1971. There, he notably sired Athens Wood, who won the 1971 St. Leger Stakes, and Hoche, winner of the 1972 Premio Presidente della Repubblica. He was also the grandsire of 1998 Grand National winner Earth Summit. Sold in 1971 to a Japanese breeding operation, Celtic Ash died in Japan at age twenty-one in 1978.

== Sire line tree ==
- Celtic Ash
  - Celtic Cone
    - Earth Summit
  - Athens Wood
  - Hoche
