= Bill Hartack =

American jockey (1932–2007)

- Hartack after winning the 1960 Kentucky Derby

Personal information
- Born: December 9, 1932 Colver, Pennsylvania, U.S.
- Died: November 26, 2007 (aged 74) Freer, Texas, U.S.
- Occupation: Jockey

Horse racing career
- Sport: Horse racing
- Career wins: 4,272

Major racing wins
- American Classics wins: Kentucky Derby (1957, 1960, 1962, 1964, 1969); Preakness Stakes (1956, 1964, 1969); Belmont Stakes (1960)

Racing awards
- United States Champion Jockey by earnings (1956, 1957); United States Champion Jockey by wins (1955, 1956, 1957, 1960)

Honours
- National Museum of Racing and Hall of Fame (1959); Bill Hartack Memorial Handicap at Hawthorne

Significant horses
- Airmans Guide, Barbizon, Bayou, Bold Lad, Bornastar, Carry Back, Celtic Ash, Decathlon, Decidedly, Dedicate, Fabius, Idun, Intentionally, Iron Liege, Kelso, Majestic Prince, Nadir, Northern Dancer, Pet Bully, Princess Turia, Round Table, Royal Native, Smart Deb, Tim Tam, Venetian Way

William John Hartack Jr. (December 9, 1932 – November 26, 2007) was an American jockey.

== Early life and career ==
Referred to by the media as both "Bill" and "Willie" (Hartack detested being called "Willie") during his racing career, Hartack grew up on Keilman's farm in Blacklick Township area of Cambria County, Pennsylvania.

His mother died from injuries in an automobile accident in 1940, when Hartack was 8.

Small in stature, at age 17 he stood 5 ft. 4 in. (1.63 m) and weighed 111 lb (50 kg), a size that enabled him to pursue a career as a jockey in Thoroughbred horse racing.

By his third season of racing, Hartack was the United States' leading jockey in both wins and money earned. He would go on to win a National Champion title six times.

He and Eddie Arcaro are the only two jockeys to ever win the Kentucky Derby five times. As well, Hartack won the Preakness Stakes three times and the Belmont Stakes once. He rode Tim Tam to victory in the 1958 Florida Derby but a week before the Kentucky Derby, Hartack broke a leg and had to give up his ride on Tim Tam to replacement jockey Ismael Valenzuela, who won the Derby.

During his riding career between 1953 and 1974 in the United States, Hartack rode 4,272 winners in 21,535 mounts. From 1974 to 1980 he raced in Hong Kong, then retired in 1981. Hartack led the nation in races won four times, and was the first rider to have purse earnings of $3 million in a season.

After he retired as a jockey, Hartack worked as a steward as well as other racing officials for the rest of his life.

Hartack made the cover of Sports Illustrated magazine in 1956 and again in 1964, plus the cover of the 10 February 1958 issue of Time, which he always refused to sign as it showed his first name as "Willie," which he detested.

He was inducted into the National Museum of Racing and Hall of Fame in 1959 at the early age of 26.

In 1967, Hartack authored (with Whitney Tower) a three-part series in Sports Illustrated titled "A Hard Ride All The Way." Published in the March 27, April 3 & April 10 issues, the series chronicled Hartack's life and included his frequent run-ins and disputes with owners, trainers, racing officials and members of the press.

Winners ridden in Triple Crown Classic races :

- Kentucky Derby:

1957 : Iron Liege
1960 : Venetian Way
1962 : Decidedly
1964 : Northern Dancer
1969 : Majestic Prince

- Preakness Stakes:

1956 : Fabius
1964 : Northern Dancer
1969 : Majestic Prince

- Belmont Stakes:

1960 : Celtic Ash

== Death ==
On November 26, 2007, two weeks before what would have been his 75th birthday, Hartack was found dead from an apparent heart attack in a cabin at a camp near the town of Freer, Texas while on a hunting vacation.

== Legacy ==
The Bill Hartack Charitable Foundation was established to honor a racing legend and icon and to continue in his name contributions to the industry he dearly loved - Thoroughbred racing. More information can be found at billhartackfoundation.com.
