= Joseph E. O'Connell =

American businessman and racehorse owner

Joseph Edward O'Connell Sr. (October 26, 1891 – July 7, 1960) was an American businessman and racehorse owner. Two of his horses, Cavan and Celtic Ash, won the Belmont Stakes.

== Early business career ==
O'Connell was born in Lowell, Massachusetts on October 26, 1891 to Edward J. and Josephine (Lynch) O'Connell. He graduated from the College of the Holy Cross in 1910 and went to work for the bond department of Lee, Higginson & Co. He remained with the company for five years before leaving to become the assistant to the president at the International Trust Company.

== Military service ==
O'Connell, a member of the 9th Regiment of the Massachusetts National Guard, was sent to the Mexican border in 1916. After this, he returned to the International Trust Company. When war was declared on Germany in 1917, O'Connell enlisted in the United States Navy, where he remained until after World War I ended.

== Return to business ==
After his discharge from the Navy, O'Connell joined Kaler, Carney, Liffler & Co, an insurance brokerage. He remained there until May 1925, when he joined National Shawmut Bank as the assistant vice president of its credit department. On January 1, 1930, he was elected vice president of the company. He also served as vice president of the Shawmut Association and the Shawmut Bank Investment Trust. On December 31, 1935, O'Connell left Shawmut to become a resident partner of Soucy, Swartswelter & Co. In addition to working for Soucy, Swartswelter & Co, O'Connell also served a president of Pilot Publishing Company and in 1939 was elected to the board of directors of the John Hancock Mutual Life Insurance Company. He later served as a director of Boston Edison and the Union Savings Bank of Boston. In 1942, after Soucy & Co. had been dissolved, O'Connell formed his own stock brokerage, O'Connell & Co.

== Philanthropy ==
O'Connell served as the treasurer of numerous Catholic charities, including St. Vincent's Orphan Asylum. He was also a member of the executive committee of St. Elizabeth's Hospital.

== Horse racing ==
O'Connell and Irish-born trainer Thomas J. Barry purchased a number of race horses from Ireland during the late 1950s. The pair purchased Cavan from Irish racehorse trainer Paddy Prendergast for an undisclosed sum. In the 1958 Belmont Stakes, Cavan upset 3-20 favorite Tim Tam to prevent the horse from winning the Triple Crown. In 1960, O'Connell and Barry returned to the Belmont with the British-bred, Irish-raised Celtic Ash. Celtic Ash came from last place to win the race by 5 1/2 lengths, giving O'Connell a perfect 2–0 record in the race. Due to an illness, O'Connell was forced to watch the race from St. Elizabeth's Hospital.

On July 7, 1960, O'Connell died at St. Elizabeth's Hospital following a four-week illness.

== Personal life ==
A native of Lowell, Massachusetts, O'Connell resided in Newton, Massachusetts during his adult life. He was the nephew of Cardinal William Henry O'Connell.

On June 6, 1917, O'Connell married Mary McGaffee at a private chapel at the residence of Cardinal O'Connell. They had one son and three daughters. Their son, Joseph Jr, was married to Pat Hitchcock, an actress and the daughter of Alfred Hitchcock. Mary O'Connell died in 1950. On August 4, 1951, O'Connell married Dorothy Wielich at the lady chapel of St. Patrick's Cathedral in New York City. Jeremiah Francis Minihan of Boston performed the ceremony. They had one son.
