= Venetian Way =

American-bred Thoroughbred racehorse

- Sire: Royal Coinage
- Grandsire: Eight Thirty
- Dam: Firefly
- Damsire: Papa Redbird
- Sex: Stallion
- Foaled: 1957
- Country: United States
- Color: Chestnut
- Breeder: John W. Greathouse
- Owner: Sunny Blue Farm (Isaac Blumberg)
- Trainer: Victor J. Sovinski
- Rider: Bill Hartack
- Record: 20: 7-4-3
- Earnings: $359,422

Major wins
- Prairie State Stakes (1959); Washington Park Futurity Stakes (1959); Warren Wright Memorial Stakes (1960) Triple Crown Race wins: Kentucky Derby (1960)
- Last updated on 2019-08-21

Venetian Way (March 23, 1957 – October 17, 1964) was an American Thoroughbred racehorse best known for winning the 1960 Kentucky Derby.

== Background ==
Venetian Way was a chestnut horse bred in Kentucky by John W. Greathouse. He was purchased by Chicago, Illinois businessman Isaac Blumberg who raced him under the nom de course of Sunny Blue Farm. Venetian Way was trained by Victor Sovinski of Kankakee, Illinois. He was named after a Miami Beach causeway.

== Racing career ==
At age two, Venetian Way made nine starts winning four times. Of his eleven starts at age three, he earned three more wins. Leading up to the 1960 U.S. Triple Crown series, Venetian Way ran second to Bally Ache in the Florida Derby. He was sent off as the third parimutuel betting choice in the Kentucky Derby behind favorite Tompion and second choice, Bally Ache.

== 1960 Triple Crown ==
In the 1960 Kentucky Derby- the "drugstore Derby"- Venetian Way beat Bally Ache. Venetian Way was a sore horse who responded admirably to butazolidin, legal in Kentucky at the time. When Venetian Way ran in the Preakness two weeks later without the help of butazolidin (pain-killing drugs are not legal in Maryland), he did not finish in the money while the sound-legged Bally Ache won. The performance of Venetian Way with and without butazolidin and other similar cases convinced the Kentucky State Racing Commission that drugs were unfair to the horse and to the public.

Ridden in the Kentucky Derby by future U.S. Racing Hall of Fame jockey Bill Hartack, Venetian Way remained within striking distance, then passed Bally Ache as they came around the final turn heading into the homestretch and won going away by 3½ lengths. In the ensuing 1960 Preakness Stakes, Venetian Way finished fifth to winner Bally Ache. Trainer Vic Sovinski was unhappy with how Hartack was riding the colt while training for the Belmont, and he sacked him. Venetian Way ran second behind Celtic Ash, who was ridden by Hartack, in the longest of the Triple Crown races, the 1½ mile Belmont Stakes.

== Stud record ==
Retired to stud for the 1961 season, Venetian Way was not successful as a sire.

== In popular culture ==
- In the Stephen King novel 11/22/63, Jake Epping, the novel's protagonist, claims his largest successful bet was on Venetian Way in the 1960 Kentucky Derby.

== Pedigree ==
Pedigree of Venetian Way (USA), chestnut stallion, 1957
Sire Royal Coinage (USA) 1952	Eight Thirty (USA); 1936	Pilate	Friar Rock
Sire Royal Coinage (USA) 1952	Eight Thirty (USA); 1936	Pilate	Herodias
Sire Royal Coinage (USA) 1952	Eight Thirty (USA); 1936	Dinner Time	High Time
Sire Royal Coinage (USA) 1952	Eight Thirty (USA); 1936	Dinner Time	Seaplane
Sire Royal Coinage (USA) 1952	Canina (USA); 1941	Bull Dog	Teddy
Sire Royal Coinage (USA) 1952	Canina (USA); 1941	Bull Dog	Plucky Liege
Sire Royal Coinage (USA) 1952	Canina (USA); 1941	Coronium	Pot Au Feu
Sire Royal Coinage (USA) 1952	Canina (USA); 1941	Coronium	Bird Call
Dam Firefly (USA) 1952	Papa Redbird (USA); 1945	Balladier	Black Toney
Dam Firefly (USA) 1952	Papa Redbird (USA); 1945	Balladier	Blue Warbler
Dam Firefly (USA) 1952	Papa Redbird (USA); 1945	Taj Bibi	Sickle
Dam Firefly (USA) 1952	Papa Redbird (USA); 1945	Taj Bibi	Black Queen
Dam Firefly (USA) 1952	Minstrelette (USA); 1933	Royal Minstrel	Tetratema
Dam Firefly (USA) 1952	Minstrelette (USA); 1933	Royal Minstrel	Harpsichord
Dam Firefly (USA) 1952	Minstrelette (USA); 1933	Bannerette	Pennant
Dam Firefly (USA) 1952	Minstrelette (USA); 1933	Bannerette	Meetime (Family 4-m)
