= Mayflower Stakes =

- Class: Listed
- Location: Suffolk Downs; East Boston, Massachusetts, USA
- Inaugurated: 1935
- Race type: Thoroughbred - Flat racing

Race information
- Distance: 5.5f - 8.32f
- Surface: Dirt
- Track: Left-handed
- Qualification: Two-year-olds

The Mayflower Stakes was one of the premiere juvenile stakes in New England. Run at Suffolk Downs, the Mayflower was held from Suffolk's inauguration in 1935 to 1988, when Suffolk was purchased from the Ogden Corporation. Run from 5 1/2 furlongs to about 8 5/16 furlongs, the event was never graded.

Notable horses to race in the Mayflower Stakes were Alsab, Pavot, Quadrangle, Sword Dancer, Timely Writer, and Seabiscuit.

Three fillies have won an edition of this race.

== Records ==
5 Furlongs:

- 59.40 - Airflame (1936), setting a new track record

5.5 Furlongs:

- 1:04.60 - Cocopet (1943), setting a new track record

6 Furlongs:

- 1:10.20 - Handsome Boy (1965)

About 8 5/16 Furlongs:

- 1:42.40 by Sword Dancer (1958)

Winning Margin:

- 6 1/2 lengths - Pentelicus (1986)

== Winners of the Mayflower ==
Year	Winner	Distance (furlongs)	Time
1988	Kechi	6	N/A
1987	Make the Most	6	1:11.25
1986	Pentelicus	6	1:12.00
1985	Avenging Storm	6	1:11.00
1984	Doubly Clear	6	1:11.45
1983	Fill Rons Pockets	6	N/A
1982	Pappa Riccio	5.5	1:05.80
1981	Timely Writer	5.5	1:04.80
1980	And More	6	N/A
1979	IC Diplomat	6	N/A
1978	Groton High	6	N/A
1977	Jet Diplomacy	6	N/A
1976	Royal Ski	6	1:11.80
1975	Rebelling	6	N/A
1974	Sweet Mouth	6	1:11.25
1973	Brunate	6	1:10.45
1972	River of Fire	6	N/A
1971	Fast Royalty	6	1:11.80
1970	Brazen Brother	6	1:11.60
1969	Fool and His Money	6	1:12:00
1968	Greek Road	6	1:12.20
1967	Four Fingers	6	1:11.00
1966	Happy Voter	6	1:12.00
1965	Handsome Boy	6	1:10.20
1964	Duc de Great	6	1:12.00
1963	Orbiter	6	N/A
1962	Steel Viking	5.5	1:06.00
1961	Stevward	5.5	1:06.40
1960	Song of Wine	5.5	1:06.20
1959	Bally Ache	5.5	1:05.80
1958	Sword Dancer	8.32	1:42.40
1957	Deadeye Dick	8.32	1:46.80
1956	Melson	8.32	1:43.00
1955	Countermand	8.32	1:43.60
1954	Door Prize	6	1:13.20
1953	Switch On	5.5	N/A
1952	Im Marie	5.5	1:06.40
1951	Lost Story	5.5	1:05.80
1950	Iamarelic	5.5	1:05.60
1949	Greek Ship	5.5	1:12.20
1948	Ocean Drive	5.5	1:11.60
1947	Dart By	5.5	1:12.20
1946	Mel Eppley	5.5	1:12.20
1945	Air Rate	5.5	1:13.00
1944	Pavot	5.5	1:05.60
1943	Cocopet	5.5	1:04.60
1942	Through Bound	5.5	1:04.80
1941	Alsab	5.5	1:05.20
1940	Blue Pair	5.5	1:05.20
1939	Roman Flag	5.5	1:05.40
1938	Heather Time	5.5	1:05.80
1937	Historic Era	6	1:12.20
1936	Airflame	5	59.40
1935	Material	6	1:13.20

== See also ==
- Massachusetts Handicap
