= Bally Ache =

American-bred Thoroughbred racehorse

- Sire: Ballydam
- Grandsire: Ballyogan
- Dam: Celestial Blue
- Damsire: Supremus
- Sex: Stallion
- Foaled: 1957
- Died: 1960
- Country: United States
- Colour: Bay
- Breeder: Marvin & Alan Gaines
- Owner: 1) Edgehill Farm (Leonard D. & Morris Fruchtman); 2) Turfland Syndicate (Joseph L. Arnold, et al)
- Trainer: Jimmy Pitt
- Record: 31: 16-9-4
- Earnings: $758,522

Major wins
- Comely Stakes (1959); Great American Stakes (1959); Juvenile Stakes (1959); Mayflower Stakes (1959); Flamingo Stakes (1960); Florida Derby (1960); Stepping Stone Purse (1960); Jersey Derby (1960) American Triple Crown races wins: Preakness Stakes (1960)
- Last updated on June 23, 2010

Bally Ache (February 3, 1957 – October 28, 1960) was an American Thoroughbred racehorse who won the Preakness Stakes in 1960 but died later only five months later from an intestinal ailment. In her book American Classic Pedigrees (1914–2002), author Avalyn Hunter wrote that Bally Ache was "a crowd favorite" who "won hearts by his sheer determination."

== Background ==
Bally Ache was a bay horse bred by brothers Alan and Marvin Gaines at their Twin Oak Farm in Walton, Kentucky. He was sired the Irish import Ballydam out of Celestial Blue. The colt was sold as a yearling as part of a $5,000 two-horse deal. His purchasers were Leonard D. Fruchtman and Morris Fruchtman, steel company executives from Toledo, Ohio, who raced a small string of horses racing under the nom de course Edgehill Farm. The colt was trained by Homer James "Jimmy" Pitt.

== Racing career ==
As a two-year-old, Bally Ache made sixteen starts. He won five stakes races, set a new track record at Jamaica Race Course for five furlongs, and finished out of the money just once. He ended the year ranked second in earnings to Bellehurst Stable's 1959 Champion Two-Year-Old, Warfare.

At age three, Bally Ache won the Flamingo Stakes and Florida Derby on the way to the Triple Crown. In the Kentucky Derby, C. V. Whitney's colt Tompion, ridden by Bill Shoemaker, was coming off wins in the Santa Anita Derby and the Blue Grass Stakes and was sent off as the betting favorite. Bally Ache, under jockey Bobby Ussery, was the second choice. However, jockey Bill Hartack aboard 6:1 outsider Venetian Way, whom Bally Ache had already beaten four times, won. Despite Bally Ache's second-place finish, it did not deter the Turfland racing syndicate led by Joseph L. Arnold, who bought the colt for what Sports Illustrated magazine described as the "staggering price of $1,250,000". Bally Ache then won by four lengths in the 84th running of the Preakness Stakes.

Entered in the Belmont Stakes, the third leg of the Triple Crown, Bally Ache came up lame the day before the race and was withdrawn. After returning to racing, in his fourth outing he suffered a career-ending ankle injury. He was scheduled to stand at stud for his owners but developed an intestinal ailment that led to his death on October 28, 1960. He was buried at Bosque Bonita Farm in Versailles, Kentucky.

== Breeding ==
Pedigree of Bally Ache (USA)
Sire Ballydam (IRE) ch. 1947	Ballyogan (GB) ch. 1939	Fair Trial	Fairway
Sire Ballydam (IRE) ch. 1947	Ballyogan (GB) ch. 1939	Fair Trial	Lady Juror
Sire Ballydam (IRE) ch. 1947	Ballyogan (GB) ch. 1939	Serial	Solario
Sire Ballydam (IRE) ch. 1947	Ballyogan (GB) ch. 1939	Serial	Booktalk
Sire Ballydam (IRE) ch. 1947	Damians (IRE) ch. 1942	Panorama	Sir Cosmo
Sire Ballydam (IRE) ch. 1947	Damians (IRE) ch. 1942	Panorama	Happy Climax
Sire Ballydam (IRE) ch. 1947	Damians (IRE) ch. 1942	Thirteen	Bulger
Sire Ballydam (IRE) ch. 1947	Damians (IRE) ch. 1942	Thirteen	Credenda
Dam Celestial Blue (USA) bay 1943	Supremus (USA) bay 1922	Ultimus	Commando
Dam Celestial Blue (USA) bay 1943	Supremus (USA) bay 1922	Ultimus	Running Stream
Dam Celestial Blue (USA) bay 1943	Supremus (USA) bay 1922	Mandy Hamilton	John O'Gaunt
Dam Celestial Blue (USA) bay 1943	Supremus (USA) bay 1922	Mandy Hamilton	My Sweetheart
Dam Celestial Blue (USA) bay 1943	Vanda Cerulea (USA) bay 1932	Blue Larkspur	Black Servant
Dam Celestial Blue (USA) bay 1943	Vanda Cerulea (USA) bay 1932	Blue Larkspur	Blossum Time
Dam Celestial Blue (USA) bay 1943	Vanda Cerulea (USA) bay 1932	Binnacle	Man o' War
Dam Celestial Blue (USA) bay 1943	Vanda Cerulea (USA) bay 1932	Binnacle	Smoky Lamp
