= Gazelle Stakes =

- Class: Grade III
- Location: Aqueduct Racetrack; Ozone Park, New York, United States
- Inaugurated: 1887
- Race type: Thoroughbred – Flat racing
- Website: www.nyra.com/aqueduct/racing/stakes-schedule/gazelle/

Race information
- Distance: 1 1/8 miles (9 furlongs)
- Surface: Dirt
- Track: left-handed
- Qualification: Three-year-old fillies
- Weight: Assigned
- Purse: $300,000

The Gazelle Stakes (formerly Gazelle Handicap until 2004) is an American thoroughbred horse race held annually at Aqueduct Racetrack in Ozone Park, New York. It is a Grade III event run over a distance of 1 1/8 miles on dirt that is open to three-year-old fillies. The race was previously run in the Fall at Belmont Park and often used as a stepping stone to the Breeders' Cup Distaff. As of 2013, the race is now run in the Spring at Aqueduct, typically on the same day as the Wood Memorial, and is now used as a prep race for the Kentucky Oaks.

== Race transition ==
Race name

- Gazelle Handicap: 1887–2004
- Gazelle Stakes: since 2005

Grading

- Grade I: 1984–2012
- Grade II: 1973–1983 and 2013-2019
- Grade III: since 2021

Distance

- 1987–1900: unknown
- 1900–1958: 1 1/16 miles
- 1959 and 1960: 1 mile
- since 1961: 1 1/8 miles

Qualification

- Three-year-old fillies
- Only 1917–1920 Three-years-old and up fillies

Venue

- Gravesend Race Track: 1887–1916
- Belmont Park: 1956–1959, 1961, 1969–2008
- Aqueduct Racetrack: 1917–1955, 1960, 1962–1968, since 2009

There were no races in 1911–1916, and 1933–1935.

== Records ==
Time record: (at current distance of 1 1/8 miles)

- 1:46.80 – Maud Muller (1974)

Most wins by a jockey:

- 4 – Ángel Cordero Jr. (1974, 1976, 1985, 1991)
- 4 – Javier Castellano (2001, 2006, 2008, 2014)

Most wins by an trainer:

- 6 – James G. Rowe Sr. (1890, 1903, 1907, 1909, 1917, 1923)
- 6 – Claude R. McGaughey III (1986, 1991, 1993, 1994, 1996, 2006)
- 6 – James E. Fitzsimmons (1924, 1927, 1929, 1930, 1942, 1960)

Most wins by an owner:

- 4 – Greentree Stable (1923, 1941, 1967, 1987)
- 4 – Sarah & Walter Jeffords (1928, 1937, 1945, 1951)
- 4 – Godolphin Racing (2002, 2009, 2012, 2021)

== Winners ==
Year	Winner	Jockey	Trainer	Owner	Time
2026	Always a Runner	Dylan Davis	Chad C. Brown	Douglas Scharbauer & Three Chimneys Farm	1:50.97
2025	Ballerina d’Oro	Dylan Davis	Chad C. Brown	Rodeo Creek Racing	1:50.67
2024	Where's My Ring	Jose Lezcano	Val Brinkerhoff	Michael McMillan	1:50.33
2023	Promiseher America	Jorge A. Vargas Jr.	Ray Handel	Tom F. McCrocklin & Hoffman Thoroughbreds	1:51.41
2022	Nostalgic	José Ortiz	William I. Mott	Godolphin Racing	1:50.41
2021	Search Results	Irad Ortiz Jr.	Chad C. Brown	Klaravich Stables	1:54.14
2020	Race Not Held				
2019	Always Shopping	Manuel Franco	Todd A. Pletcher	Repole Stable	1:52.91
2018	My Miss Lilly	Joe Bravo	Mark A. Hennig	Courtlandt Farms (Donald & Donna Adam)	1:50.42
2017	Miss Sky Warrior	Paco Lopez	Kelly J. Breen	Arlene's Sun Star Stable	1:51.71
2016	Lewis Bay	Irad Ortiz Jr.	Chad C. Brown	Alpha Delta Stables	1:52.60
2015	Condo Commando	Joel Rosario	Rudy R. Rodriguez	Michael Dubb, Bethlehem Stable & The Elkstone Group	1:52.17
2014	My Miss Sophia	Javier Castellano	Todd A. Pletcher	Mathis Stable	1:50.48
2013	Close Hatches	Joel Rosario	William I. Mott	Juddmonte Farms	1:50.53
2012	Dance Card	Ramon Domínguez	Kiaran McLaughlin	Godolphin Racing	1:50.39
2011	Awesome Feather	Jeffrey Sanchez	Chad C. Brown	Stronach Stables	1:50.01
2010	No Such Word	Terry J. Thompson	Cindy Jones	Brereton C. Jones	1:51.05
2009	Flashing	Richard Migliore	Saeed bin Suroor	Godolphin Racing	1:50.94
2008	Music Note	Javier Castellano	Saeed bin Suroor	Gainsborough Farm	1:50.20
2007	Lear's Princess	Eibar Coa	Kiaran McLaughlin	West Point Thoroughbreds	1:47.86
2006	Pine Island	Javier Castellano	Claude R. McGaughey III	Phipps Stable	1:48.93
2005	In The Gold	Gary Stevens	Nick Zito	Live Oak Plantation	1:49.75
2004	Stellar Jayne	Robby Albarado	D. Wayne Lukas	Spendthrift Farm, Chuck Kidder, Nancy Cole & Nick Strong	1:48.25
2003	Buy the Sport	Pat Day	Brian J. Meehan	Georgica Stable	1:48.57
2002	Imperial Gesture	José A. Santos	Saeed bin Suroor	Godolphin Racing	1:47.12
2001	Exogenous	Javier Castellano	Scotty Schulhofer	Centaur Farms	1:47.68
2000	Critical Eye	Mike E. Smith	Scott Schwartz	H. & C. Schwartz	1:48.54
1999	Silverbulletday	Jerry D. Bailey	Bob Baffert	Michael E. Pegram	1:47.71
1998	Tap to Music	Pat Day	Joseph Orseno	Stronach Stable	1:49.72
1997	Royal Indy	Pat Day	H. Allen Jerkens	Georgia Hofmann	1:49.11
1996	My Flag	Jerry D. Bailey	Claude R. McGaughey III	Ogden Phipps	1:48.08
1995	Serena's Song	Gary Stevens	D. Wayne Lukas	Bob & Beverly Lewis	1:47.29
1994	Heavenly Prize	Mike E. Smith	Claude R. McGaughey III	Ogden Phipps	1:47.20
1993	Dispute	Jerry D. Bailey	Claude R. McGaughey III	Ogden Mills Phipps	1:47.00
1992	Saratoga Dew	Herb McCauley	Gary Sciacca	Charles F. Engel	1:47.63
1991	Versailles Treaty	Ángel Cordero Jr.	Claude R. McGaughey III	Cynthia Phipps	1:47.00
1990	Highland Talk	Jean-Luc Samyn	Philip G. Johnson	Cobble View Stable	1:50.00
1989	Tactile	Richard Migliore	Richard W. Small	Robert E. Myerhoff	1:48.00
1988	Classic Crown	Randy Romero	D. Wayne Lukas	Star Crown Stable	1:49.00
1987	Single Blade	Chris Antley	Robert Reinacher	Greentree Stable	1:48.00
1986	Classy Cathy	Earlie Fires	Claude R. McGaughey III	Edward A. Cox Jr.	1:48.00
1985	Kamikaze Rick	Ángel Cordero Jr.	John Parisella	Theodore M. Sabarese	1:48.00
1984	Miss Oceana	Eddie Maple	Woody Stephens	Newstead Farm	1:47.00
1983	High Schemes	Jean-Luc Samyn	Philip G. Johnson	J. O. Morrisey Jr.	1:48.00
1982	Broom Dance	Gregg McCarron	James W. Maloney	Christiana Stables	1:47.00
1981	Discorama	Ruben Hernandez	James W. Maloney	Christiana Stables	1:48.00
1980	Love Sign	Ruben Hernandez	Sidney Watters Jr.	Stephen C. Clark Jr.	1:49.20
1979	Himalayan	Eddie Maple	George M. Baker	Louis Lee Haggin II	1:48.40
1978	Tempest Queen	Jorge Velásquez	Thomas L. Rondinello	Darby Dan Farm	1:49.80
1977	Pearl Necklace	Steve Cauthen	Roger Laurin	Reginald N. Webster	1:48.00
1976	Revidere	Ángel Cordero Jr.	David A. Whiteley	William Haggin Perry	1:47.80
1975	Land Girl	Jacinto Vásquez	John A. Nerud	Tartan Stable	1:49.40
1974	Maud Muller	Ángel Cordero Jr.	Thomas L. Rondinello	Darby Dan Farm	1:46.80
1973	Desert Vixen	Jorge Velásquez	Thomas F. Root Sr.	Harry T. Mangurian Jr.	1:47.40
1972	Susan's Girl	Laffit Pincay Jr.	John W. Russell	Fred W. Hooper	1:48.00
1971	Forward Gal	Michael Hole	Warren A. Croll Jr.	Aisco Stable	1:48.60
1970	Missile Belle	Pete D. Anderson	Woody Stephens	John A. Morris	1:50.80
1969	Gallant Bloom	John L. Rotz	Max Hirsch	King Ranch	1:49.00
1968	Another Nell	Craig Perret	Paul L. Kelley	Bruce A. Norris	1:50.80
1967	Sweet Folly	Heliodoro Gustines	John M. Gaver Sr.	Greentree Stable	1:50.20
1966	Prides Profile	Manuel Ycaza	J. Elliott Burch	Rokeby Stable	1:52.40
1965	What a Treat	John L. Rotz	Sylvester E. Veitch	George D. Widener Jr.	1:51.40
1964	Face The Facts	Larry Adams	James W. Maloney	William Haggin Perry	1:51.60
1963	Lamb Chop	Braulio Baeza	James W. Maloney	William Haggin Perry	1:50.00
1962	Bramalea	Braulio Baeza	James P. Conway	Darby Dan Farm	1:50.00
1961	Shimmy Dancer	Manuel Ycaza	not found	Anne Minor Stone	1:49.00
1960	Berlo	Eric Guerin	Richard E. Handlen	Foxcatcher Farm	1:35.80
1960	Sarcastic	Henry Moreno	James E. Fitzsimmons	Ogden Phipps	1:35.40
1959	Sunset Glow	Bill Shoemaker	Charles V. Reynolds	Sidney M. Barton	1:36.80
1959	Cee Zee	Henry Moreno	MacKenzie Miller	Rockburn Farm	1:36.00
1958	Idun	Bill Hartack	Sherrill W. Ward	Josephine Bay	1:43.20
1957	Bayou	Eddie Arcaro	Moody Jolley	Claiborne Farm	1:43.20
1956	Scampering	Angel Valenzuela	Victor J. Nickerson	Victor J. Nickerson	1:43.80
1955	Manotick	Angel Valenzuela	Casey Hayes	Christopher T. Chenery	1:45.60
1954	On Your Own	William Boland	Max Hirsch	King Ranch	1:46.60
1953	Grecian Queen	Eric Guerin	James P. Conway	Florence Whitaker	1:45.80
1952	Hushaby Baby	Raymond York	Moody Jolley	Cain Hoy Stable	1:45.60
1951	Kiss Me Kate	Warren Mehrtens	Oscar White	Walter M. Jeffords	1:46.00
1950	Next Move	Eric Guerin	William C. Winfrey	Alfred G. Vanderbilt II	1:43.00
1949	Nell K.	Douglas Dodson	John B. Partridge	Spring Hill Farm	1:47.80
1948	Sweet Dream	Robert Permane	Don Cameron	Havahome Stable	1:45.20
1947	Cosmic Missile	Harry Pratt	Bert B. Williams	Circle M Farm	1:46.00
1946	Bridal Flower	Abelardo DeLara	James W. Smith	Edward R. Bradley	1:46.40
1945	Ace Card	Eddie Arcaro	Oscar White	Sarah F. Jeffords	1:45.60
1944	Whirlabout	Johnny Longden	George M. Odom	Louis B. Mayer	1:43.60
1943	Anthemion	John Gilbert	Casey Hayes	Christopher T. Chenery	1:48.20
1942	Vagrancy	James Stout	James E. Fitzsimmons	Belair Stud	1:45.00
1941	Tangled	Eddie Arcaro	John M. Gaver Sr.	Greentree Stable	1:45.80
1940	Fairy Chant	Basil James	Richard E. Handlen	Foxcatcher Farm	1:46.00
1939	Red Eye	Basil James	J. P. "Sammy" Smith	Falaise Farm	1:43.20
1938	Invoke	James Stout	Andy Schuttinger	Joseph M. Roebling	1:45.40
1937	Regal Lily	James Stout	Oscar White	Walter M. Jeffords	1:44.00
1936	Gold Seeker	Wayne D. Wright	Richard E. Handlen	Foxcatcher Farm	1:44.60
1932	Playfole	Buddy Hanford	Selby L. Burch	Selby L. Burch	1:45.40
1931	Avenger	Raymond Workman	T. J. Healey	Cornelius V. Whitney	1:46.00
1930	Erin	James Burke	James E. Fitzsimmons	Wheatley Stable	1:46.00
1929	March Hare	James Burke	James E. Fitzsimmons	Wheatley Stable	1:47.60
1928	Bateau	Linus McAtee	Scott P. Harlan	Walter M. Jeffords	1:45.20
1927	Flambino	Danny McAuliffe	James E. Fitzsimmons	Belair Stud	1:45.00
1926	Corvette	Laverne Fator	George Conway	Glen Riddle Farm	1:44.80
1925	Nedana	Laverne Fator	Sam Hildreth	Rancocas Stable	1:44.80
1924	Priscilla Ruley	John Maiben	James E. Fitzsimmons	Belair Stud	1:44.40
1923	Untidy	Earl Sande	James G. Rowe Jr.	Greentree Stable	1:45.80
1922	Lady Baltimore	Chick Lang	William M. Garth	Joshua S. Cosden	1:45.80
1921	Banksia	B. Kennedy	James N. Evans	Gifford A. Cochran	1:47.60
1920	Pen Rose (4)	Laverne Fator	Orson J. Decker	Triple Springs Farm	1:46.00
1919	Milkmaid (3)	Andy Schuttinger	H. Guy Bedwell	J. K. L. Ross	1:45.00
1918	Fairy Wand (4)	Charles Fairbrother	James N. Evans	Gifford A. Cochran	1:45.00
1917	Regret (5)	Johnny Loftus	James G. Rowe Sr.	Harry Payne Whitney	1:45.40
1910	Ocean Bound	Carroll Shilling	French Brooks	Woodford Clay	1:52.00
1909	Maskette	Richard Scoville	James G. Rowe Sr.	James R. Keene	1:48.00
1908	Stamina	Eddie Dugan	John W. Rogers	Harry Payne Whitney	1:48.00
1907	Court Dress	Jack Martin	James G. Rowe Sr.	James R. Keene	1:47.20
1906	Flip Flap	Walter Miller	A. J. Goldsborough	Jack A. Bennet	1:48.00
1905	Tradition	Willie Davis	A. Jack Joyner	Sydney Paget	1:51.40
1904	Beldame	Frank O'Neill	Fred Burlew	Newton Bennington	1:52.60
1903	Stolen Moments	Willie Gannon	James G. Rowe Sr.	Foxhall P. Keene	1:49.60
1902	Blue Girl	Tommy Burns	John W. Rogers	William C. Whitney	1:49.60
1901	Trigger	George M. Odom	Charles F. Hill	Clarence H. Mackay	1:48.20
1900	Indian Fairy	Winfield O'Connor	Julius Bauer	Arthur Featherstone	1:50.00
1899	The Rose	Danny Maher	Matthew M. Allen	William H. Clark	1:57.50
1898	Geisha	Tod Sloan	not found	Arthur White	1:56.75
1897	Casseopia	Fred Littlefield	R. Wyndham Walden	Alfred Hennen Morris & Dave Morris	1:59.25
1896	Intermission	Fred Taral	Henry Harris	John E. McDonald	1:58.50
1895	The Butterflies	Henry Griffin	John J. Hyland	John Daly	1:59.50
1894	Nahma	Fred Littlefield	R. Wyndham Walden	John Albert Morris, Alfred Hennen Morris & Dave Morris	2:03.00
1893	Naptha	Willie Simms	William J. Speirs	William J. Speirs	1:59.50
1892	Yorkville Belle	Isaac Murphy	Matthew M. Allen	Frank A. Ehret	2:04.00
1891	Ambulance	Fred Littlefield	R. Wyndham Walden	John Albert Morris & Alfred Morris	1:59.75
1890	Amazon	Anthony Hamilton	James G. Rowe Sr.	August Belmont	1:58.50
1889	Gypsy Queen	William J. Fitzpatrick	James Dumas	Excelsior Stable	2:00.50
1888	Winona	Willie Martin	Robert W. Thomas	Santa Anita Stable	2:03.00
1887	Firenze	Anthony Hamilton	Matthew Byrnes	James Ben Ali Haggin	1:56.50
