= Heliopolis (horse) =

British-bred Thoroughbred racehorse

- Sire: Hyperion
- Grandsire: Gainsborough
- Dam: Drift
- Damsire: Swynford
- Sex: Stallion
- Foaled: 1936
- Country: United States
- Colour: Bay
- Breeder: Lord Derby
- Owner: Lord Derby
- Trainer: Walter Earl

Major wins
- Imperial Produce Stakes (1938); Chester Vase (1939); Gratwicke Produce Stakes (1939); Prince of Wales's Stakes (1939); Princess of Wales's Stakes (1939)

Awards
- Leading sire in North America (1950, 1954)

Heliopolis (1936–1959) was a British thoroughbred racehorse and Champion sire.

== Background ==
Heliopolis was bred and raced by Edward Stanley, 17th Earl of Derby. As a son of Hyperion and Drift he was a full brother to the double British classic winner Sun Stream.

== Racing career ==
He was raced from age two to four and then exported during World War II to the Coldstream Stud of E. Dale Shaffer in Lexington, Kentucky and arrived at the port of New York on August 10, 1941. After limited and less than successful racing on dirt, he was sent to stand at his owner's stud.

== Stud record ==
A sire of Champions, Heliopolis was the Leading sire in North America in 1950 and 1954. Among his best progeny were three American Champion Three-Year-Old Fillys, Grecian Queen (1953), Parlo (1954), and Berlo (1960). Parlo also earned the American Champion Older Female Horse title in 1954 and 1955. He was the sire of the very good runner and sire of Champions, Summer Tan. His other successful sons include Ace Admiral, Greek Ship, Greek Song, High Gun, the 1954 American Champion Three-Year-Old Male Horse and 1955 American Champion Older Male Horse, and the top caliber sprinter Olympia who became a foundation sire for Florida breeder, Fred W. Hooper. Heliopolis is the grandsire of Pia Star, and Pucker Up.

Heliopolis was the damsire of the 1968 Kentucky Derby winner, Forward Pass, of All Beautiful, the 1969 Kentucky Broodmare of the Year as well as Iberia who earned Kentucky Broodmare honors in 1971 and who was the dam of 1972 Kentucky Derby and Belmont Stakes winner, Hall of Fame inductee, Riva Ridge. Heliopolis was also the damsire of Marshua.

E. Dale Shaffer sold Coldstream Stud along with Heliopolis in 1951 to Henry Knight who then syndicated the stallion after which he was moved to Almahurst Farm in Nicholasville, Kentucky.

An aging Heliopolis suffered from laminitis and in 1959 the twenty-three-year-old horse was humanely euthanized.

== Sire line tree ==
- Heliopolis
  - Marine Victory
  - Ace Admiral
    - Ace Marine
    - Inside Tract
    - Frosty Admiral
  - Olympia
    - Decathlon
      - Western Warrior
    - Air Pilot
    - Greek Game
    - Lucky Mel
    - Alhambra
    - Talent Show
    - Winonly
    - Editorialist
    - Pia Star
      - Poley
    - Creme dela Creme
      - Cafe Prince
      - Rich Cream
        - Creme Fraiche
    - Top Bid
  - Greek Ship
  - Greek Song
    - Greek Money
  - Charlie McAdam
    - Dhaulagiri
      - Dhaudevi
  - Helioscope
  - High Gun
  - Summer Tan
    - Sunrise County
  - Rose Trellis
  - Grey Eagle
    - Little Bit
  - Globemaster

== Pedigree ==
Pedigree of Heliopolis, bay stallion, 1936
| Sire Hyperion (GB) Chestnut 1930 | Gainsborough (GB); Bay 1915 | Bayardo | Bay Ronald |
| Sire Hyperion (GB) Chestnut 1930 | Gainsborough (GB); Bay 1915 | Bayardo | Galicia |
| Sire Hyperion (GB) Chestnut 1930 | Gainsborough (GB); Bay 1915 | Rosedrop | St Frusquin* |
| Sire Hyperion (GB) Chestnut 1930 | Gainsborough (GB); Bay 1915 | Rosedrop | Rosaline |
| Sire Hyperion (GB) Chestnut 1930 | Selene (GB); Bay 1919 | Chaucer | St Simon* |
| Sire Hyperion (GB) Chestnut 1930 | Selene (GB); Bay 1919 | Chaucer | Canterbury Pilgrim* |
| Sire Hyperion (GB) Chestnut 1930 | Selene (GB); Bay 1919 | Serenissima | Minoru |
| Sire Hyperion (GB) Chestnut 1930 | Selene (GB); Bay 1919 | Serenissima | Gondolette |
| Dam Drift (FR) Brown 1926 | Swynford (GB); Brown 1907 | John o'Gaunt | Isinglass |
| Dam Drift (FR) Brown 1926 | Swynford (GB); Brown 1907 | John o'Gaunt | La Fleche* |
| Dam Drift (FR) Brown 1926 | Swynford (GB); Brown 1907 | Canterbury Pilgrim* | Tristan* |
| Dam Drift (FR) Brown 1926 | Swynford (GB); Brown 1907 | Canterbury Pilgrim* | Pilgrimage* |
| Dam Drift (FR) Brown 1926 | Santa Cruz (GB) chestnut 1916 | Neil Gow | Marco |
| Dam Drift (FR) Brown 1926 | Santa Cruz (GB) chestnut 1916 | Neil Gow | Chelandry |
| Dam Drift (FR) Brown 1926 | Santa Cruz (GB) chestnut 1916 | Santa Brigida | St Simon* |
| Dam Drift (FR) Brown 1926 | Santa Cruz (GB) chestnut 1916 | Santa Brigida | Bridget (Family No. 8-g) |

* Heliopolis is inbred 4S x 3D to the mare Canterbury Pilgrim, meaning that she appears fourth generation on the sire side of his pedigree, and third generation on the dam side of his pedigree.

* Heliopolis is inbred 5S x 4S x 5D x 4D to the stallion St Simon, meaning that he appears fifth generation (via St Frusquin) and fourth generation on the sire side of his pedigree, and fifth generation (via La Fleche) and fourth generation on the dam side of his pedigree.
