= Black Tarquin =

American-bred Thoroughbred racehorse

- Sire: Rhodes Scholar
- Grandsire: Pharos
- Dam: Vagrancy
- Damsire: Sir Gallahad III
- Sex: Stallion
- Foaled: 1945
- Country: United States
- Colour: Brown
- Breeder: William Woodward Sr.
- Owner: William Woodward Sr.
- Trainer: Cecil Boyd-Rochfort
- Record: 15: 8–4–0

Major wins
- Royal Lodge Stakes (1947); Gimcrack Stakes (1947); Lingfield Derby Trial (1948); St. James's Palace Stakes (1948); St. Leger Stakes (1948); White Rose Stakes (1949)

Honours
- Timeform rating 136; Timeform top-rated three-year-old (1948); Top-rated British three-year-old (1948)

Black Tarquin (1945–1965) was an American-bred, British-trained racehorse and sire, best known for winning the St. Leger Stakes in 1948 and for his rivalry with Alycidon. In a career which lasted from June 1947 until July 1949, he ran fifteen times and won eight races. He was one of the leading two-year-olds of 1947, although he did not race after winning the Gimcrack Stakes in August. He was slow to reach peak fitness in 1948, and was unplaced in The Derby, but showed his best form in autumn when he beat a strong field in the St. Leger Stakes. His form continued into the following spring, but his career was effectively ended by his defeat in the Ascot Gold Cup. The victories of Black Tarquin led to a change in the way in which the Thoroughbred was defined in Britain.

== Background ==
Black Tarquin was a dark brown, almost black horse with a white star bred in the United States by his owner William Woodward Sr. He was the most successful horse sired by the British-bred Rhodes Scholar, who won the Eclipse Stakes in 1936 and was exported to America in 1940. Black Tarquin's dam was the leading racemare Vagrancy, the American Champion Three-Year-Old Filly of 1942 when her wins included the Coaching Club American Oaks and the Black-Eyed Susan Stakes. Vagrancy was a half-sister of the CCA Oaks winner Hypnotic and was a descendant of the influential Kentucky-bred broodmare Frizette. Because of the rules imposed by the Jersey Act of 1913, Black Tarquin, like many American racehorses, was not eligible for inclusion in the General Stud Book, and was therefore technically a half-bred rather than a Thoroughbred. The successes of Black Tarquin and his contemporary My Babu were important factors in the Jersey Act being abandoned in 1949.

In 1946, Woodward sent his colt to England, where he was trained by Cecil Boyd-Rochfort at his Freemason Lodge stables in Newmarket, Suffolk. Standing 16.3 hands high, Black Tarquin was an unusually large and heavily built Thoroughbred, which meant that he had to be trained with great care. Veterinary opinion was that the horse would not stand up to hard training, but he required regular exercise to keep his weight in check.

== Racing career ==
=== 1947: two-year-old season ===
Black Tarquin began his career by finishing unplaced in a race at Royal Ascot in June 1947. He returned to Ascot a month later and recorded his first win in the five furlong Royal Lodge Stakes (in the following year, the Royal Lodge Stakes assumed its current form as a one mile race run in autumn). At Goodwood Racecourse later that month, he finished second to Dorothy Paget's colt Birthday Greetings in the Richmond Stakes. In August, Black Tarquin reversed the form with Birthday Greetings to win the prestigious Gimcrack Stakes at York in a new track record time of 1:10.3 for six furlongs. Although he did not run again that year, as Boyd-Rochfort wanted to give the horse more time to develop, Black Tarquin's performances established him as one of the season's leading juveniles. In the Free Handicap, a ranking of the best British two-year-olds, he was assigned a weight of 131 pounds, two pounds below the top-rated My Babu,. Among the bookmakers, he was one of the winter favourites for the following year's Classics.

=== 1948: three-year-old season ===
In 1948, Black Tarquin was aimed at the 2000 Guineas but sustained a bruised heel when training on unusually firm turf and missed the race. He made his first appearance of the year at Newmarket in May when he finished second to Riding Mill in the Newmarket Stakes. The result was considered a major upset, and Boyd-Rochfort was unable to offer an explanation, although it was pointed out that the colt was well short of peak fitness. Later that month, he re-established himself as a leading contender for The Derby by winning the Derby Trial Stakes at Lingfield Park at odds of 8/11.

At Epsom, Black Tarquin started at odds of 100/7 for the Derby in a field of thirty-two runners and was reported to be strongly fancied by his trainer. After being badly hampered at Tattenham Corner, he made no impression in the closing stages and finished eighth behind the French-trained winner My Love. At Royal Ascot, Black Tarquin was brought back in distance for the one-mile St. James's Palace Stakes. Starting at odds of 5/1, he easily defeated the 2000 Guineas runner-up The Cobbler, who started odds-on favourite. In July, he returned to Ascot for the one and a half mile Queen Elizabeth Stakes (the forerunner of the King George VI and Queen Elizabeth Stakes) in which he finished second, beaten a short head, by the Italian four-year-old Tenerani. By finishing ahead of some well-regarded horses, he established himself as a leading contender for the St Leger.

Black Tarquin did not race again until the St Leger at Doncaster on 11 September, in which he was ridden by the Australian jockey Edgar Britt and started at odds of 15/2. With a winner's prize of £15,269, the race was the most valuable ever run in Britain and attracted a crowd estimated at 500,000 which included the King and Queen. Doug Smith attempted to make all the running on the outsider Alycidon, but Britt guided Black Tarquin to the lead in the last quarter mile and won comfortably by one and a half lengths. Solar Slipper finished third, with the 7/4 favourite My Love unplaced. At the end of the season, Black Tarquin was the highest-rated three-year-old in Britain, and was being compared to the American champion Citation.

=== 1949: four-year-old season ===
Black Tarquin was kept in training at four with the Ascot Gold Cup as his target. He won his first three races beginning with the Chippenham Stakes. At Newmarket in May, he won the one and a half mile Burwell Stakes by five lengths from Fighter Command. He then won the White Rose Stakes over one and a quarter miles at Hurst Park Racecourse.

The Gold Cup featured a rematch with Alycidon, who had been unbeaten in four staying races since his defeat at Doncaster. Black Tarquin was made 10/11 favourite for the race ahead of Alycidon on 5/4. Alycidon, assisted by two pacemakers to ensure a true test of stamina, took the lead five furlongs from the finish. In the straight, Edgar Britt moved Black Tarquin up to challenge the leader and drew level a furlong from the finish, but Alycidon pulled away again in the closing stages to win by five lengths.

The race appeared to exhaust Black Tarquin, and in his only subsequent appearance he showed no sign of his previous form when he ran a "lifeless" race to finish fourth of the six runners in the Princess of Wales's Stakes at Newmarket on 30 June.

== Assessment and honours ==
The independent Timeform organisation gave Black Tarquin a rating of 134 in 1948 and 136 in 1949.

In their book, A Century of Champions, based on the Timeform rating system, John Randall and Tony Morris rated Black Tarquin a "superior" winner of the St Leger and the best British-trained racehorse of his generation.

== Stud record ==
Black Tarquin returned to America for the start of his stud career, standing at Claiborne Farm. In 1954, he was transferred to Ireland, where he remained until his death in 1965. He was not a successful sire of flat racers, as most of his stock were slow to mature and needed long distances to show their best form. His most successful progeny included the Goodwood Cup winner Trelawny and the Cambridgeshire Handicap winner Tarqogan. Towards the end of his stud career, he sired some good National Hunt horse including Black Secret, who finished second and third in successive Grand Nationals.

== Pedigree ==
Pedigree of Black Tarquin (USA), brown stallion, 1945
Sire Rhodes Scholar (GB)	Pharos	Phalaris	Polymelus
Sire Rhodes Scholar (GB)	Pharos	Phalaris	Bromus
Sire Rhodes Scholar (GB)	Pharos	Scapa Flow	Chaucer
Sire Rhodes Scholar (GB)	Pharos	Scapa Flow	Anchora
Sire Rhodes Scholar (GB)	Book Law	Buchan	Sunstar
Sire Rhodes Scholar (GB)	Book Law	Buchan	Hamoaze
Sire Rhodes Scholar (GB)	Book Law	Popingaol	Dark Ronald
Sire Rhodes Scholar (GB)	Book Law	Popingaol	Popinjay
Dam Vagrancy (USA)	Sir Gallahad III	Teddy	Ajax
Dam Vagrancy (USA)	Sir Gallahad III	Teddy	Rondeau
Dam Vagrancy (USA)	Sir Gallahad III	Plucky Liege	Spearmint
Dam Vagrancy (USA)	Sir Gallahad III	Plucky Liege	Concertina
Dam Vagrancy (USA)	Valkyr	Man o' War	Fair Play
Dam Vagrancy (USA)	Valkyr	Man o' War	Mahubah
Dam Vagrancy (USA)	Valkyr	Princess Palatine	Prince Palatine
Dam Vagrancy (USA)	Valkyr	Princess Palatine	Frizette (Family 13-c)
