= Summer Tan =

American-bred Thoroughbred racehorse

- Sire: Heliopolis
- Grandsire: Hyperion
- Dam: Miss Zibby
- Damsire: Omaha
- Sex: Stallion
- Foaled: 1952
- Country: United States
- Colour: Bay
- Breeder: Dorothy Bryan Firestone
- Owner: Dorothy Bryan Firestone Galbreath
- Trainer: Sherrill W. Ward
- Record: 28: 11-12-2
- Earnings: US$542,796

Major wins
- Cowdin Stakes (1954); Garden State Futurity (1954); United States Hotel Stakes (1954); Youthful Stakes (1954); Gallant Fox Handicap (1956); Pimlico Special (1956); Vosburgh Handicap (1956); McLennan Handicap (1957)

Summer Tan (1952–1969) was an American Thoroughbred racehorse

== Background ==
Summer Tan was bred and raced by Dorothy Firestone Galbreath and race conditioned by U.S. Racing Hall of Fame trainer, Sherrill Ward.

== Racing career ==
=== 1954: two-year-old season ===
At age two, Summer Tan won major races in his age group such as the United States Hotel Stakes, the Cowdin Stakes in track record time, the Youthful Stakes, the Garden State Stakes and finished second in the Hopeful and Belmont Futurity Stakes. While Nashua was voted the 1954 American Champion Two-Year-Old Colt, Summer Tan was assigned top weight of 128 lbs on Frank E. Kilroe's Experimental Handicap.

In early November 1954, shortly after his win in the Garden State Futurity, Summer Tan fell seriously ill and was diagnosed as suffering from an arterial blood clot.

=== 1955: three-year-old season ===
In January, his handlers announced that Summer Tan had still not recovered enough to race and would not start in the Flamingo Stakes, a scheduled early prep on the road to the Kentucky Derby. After more than a five-month layoff, Summer Tan returned to racing on April 4, 1955, in the mile and a sixteenth Springboard Purse, an allowance race at Belmont Park in New York which he won by fourteen lengths in near track record time. His next and second start as a 3-year-old came on April 24 in the Wood Memorial Stakes in which he was beaten by a neck by archrival, Nashua. In the Kentucky Derby, Summer Tan finished third behind Nashua and winner, Swaps.

=== Later career ===
At age four, Summer Tan won three important races including the prestigious Pimlico Special. He also set a new track record for 1 5/8 miles on dirt at Jamaica Race Course in New York while winning the Gallant Fox Handicap. In his final year of racing in 1957, the then five-year-old won the McLennan Handicap at Hialeah Park Race Track in Hialeah, Florida.

== Stud record ==
Summer Tan was retired to stud duty at the Galbreath family's Darby Dan Farm in Lexington, Kentucky where he met with good success. His offspring includes Summer Scandal, the 1966 American Champion Older Female Horse, plus multiple stakes race winners, Indian Sunlite and Sunrise County. Summer Tan was also the damsire of Typecast, the 1972 American Champion Older Female Horse, and 1985 Breeders' Cup Classic winner, Proud Truth.

Summer Tan died of a heart attack at age seventeen on October 16, 1969, and was buried in the equine cemetery at Darby Dan Farm.
