= Desert Vixen =

American-bred Thoroughbred racehorse

- Sire: In Reality
- Grandsire: Intentionally
- Dam: Desert Trial
- Damsire: Moslem Chief
- Sex: Filly
- Foaled: 1970
- Country: United States
- Colour: Dark Bay
- Breeder: Muriel Vanderbilt
- Owner: Harry T. Mangurian Jr.
- Trainer: Thomas F. Root Sr.
- Record: 28: 13-6-3
- Earnings: $421,538

Major wins
- Alabama Stakes (1973); Delaware Oaks (1973); Monmouth Oaks (1973); Test Stakes (1973); Gazelle Handicap (1973); Beldame Stakes (1973 & 1974); Matchmaker Handicap (1974)

Awards
- U.S. Champion 3-Yr-Old Filly (1973); U.S. Champion Older Female Horse (1974)

Honours
- United States Racing Hall of Fame (1979); Desert Vixen Stakes at Gulfstream Park
- Last updated on August 12, 2017

Desert Vixen (1970–1982) was an American Thoroughbred racehorse. She was the leading American filly of her generation, winning an Eclipse Award at the ages of both three and four. She was later inducted into the U. S. Racing Hall of Fame.

== Racing career ==
Desert Vixen began racing at age two and met with limited success, winning only one of her five starts. At age three, Desert Vixen was the dominant filly in her class, winning eight straight races including a number of important Grade I stakes and tying the Belmont Park track record held by Canonero II in the Beldame Stakes. She broke the stakes record in the 1973 Gazelle Handicap which had been set by Susan's Girl the previous year. Her performance earned her the 1973 Eclipse Award for Outstanding 3-Year-Old Filly.

At age four, Desert Vixen started slowly but then earned three important wins in her eleven races. One of her three second-place finishes came when she raced on turf for the first time in her career in the prestigious Washington, D.C. International. In that Grade I race, she finished behind winner Admetus but ahead of the superstar filly Dahlia, who had won the race in 1973. Desert Vixen won her second Beldame Stakes by 11½ lengths and tied the Atlantic City Race Course track record in winning the Matchmaker Handicap. Her 1974 performances earned her a second Eclipse Award as U.S. Champion Older Female Horse.

== Stud record ==
As a broodmare, Desert Vixen produced Real Shadai, the leading sire in Japan in 1993.

In 1979, Desert Vixen was inducted into the United States' National Museum of Racing and Hall of Fame. She died in 1982 and is buried at Breckinridge Farm in Lexington, Kentucky.
