= Gallant Bloom =

American-bred Thoroughbred racehorse

- Sire: Gallant Man
- Grandsire: Migoli
- Dam: Multiflora
- Damsire: Beau Max
- Sex: Filly
- Foaled: May 22, 1966
- Country: United States
- Colour: Brown
- Breeder: King Ranch
- Owner: Robert J. Kleberg Jr.
- Trainer: Max Hirsch; Buddy Hirsch (1969, 1970)
- Record: 22 Starts: 16-1-1
- Earnings: $535,739

Major wins
- Gardenia Stakes (1968); Matron Stakes (1968); National Stallion Stakes (filly division) (1968); Matchmaker Stakes (1969); Delaware Oaks (1969); Gazelle Stakes (1969); Spinster Stakes (1969); Monmouth Oaks (1969); Post-Deb Stakes (1969); Liberty Belle Handicap (1969); Santa Margarita Invitational Handicap (1970); Santa Maria Handicap (1970)

Awards
- DRF American Champion Two-Year-Old Filly (1968); American Champion Three-Year-Old Filly (1969); DRF American Champion Female Handicap Horse (1969)

Honours
- U.S. Racing Hall of Fame (1977) #79 - Top 100 U.S. Racehorses of the 20th Century; Gallant Bloom Handicap at Belmont Park

Gallant Bloom (foaled May 22, 1966 – June 7, 1991) was a plain brown filly sired by the great Gallant Man, also a plain brown horse. She was small and possessed a gentle temperament. And yet she regularly beat the best fillies and mares in America. She defeated both Shuvee and Gamely.

== Racing career ==
In her two-year-old season, Gallant Bloom won her first two starts but then lost the next three by large margins. She seemed to find her footing in an allowance race and followed that by taking the Matron Stakes by a romp. In her first meeting with Shuvee, Gallant Bloom blew a three-length lead and was caught at the wire. Max Hirsch believed Gallant Bloom hadn't really lost to Shuvee; she beat herself. He put her into rigorous training. After that, Gallant Bloom won twelve stakes races in a row, beginning in 1968 at age two and ending in 1970. She beat Shuvee in the Gardenia and was voted two-year-old champion filly by Daily Racing Form. The rival Thoroughbred Racing Association and Turf & Sports Digest awards were won by Process Shot.

In 1969, Shuvee seemed likely to win Three-Year-Old-Filly honors. She had won everything from the Alabama Stakes to the Ladies Handicap, defeating top older mares. She became the second winner of the Triple Crown for Fillies. But at the same time, Gallant Bloom won every race she ran, at any distance, on any surface at eight race tracks, in the process defeating Shuvee three times (the Gardenia, the Delaware Oaks, and the Gazelle Handicap), and Gamely once in the Matchmaker Stakes. For this, Gallant Bloom was awarded the top Three-Year-Old Filly even though Shuvee had seemed the out-and-out winner early in the season. That year, Shuvee did not receive a single vote; it was a Gallant Bloom rout. Gallant Bloom also won the Daily Racing Form award for Champion Female Handicap Horse.

Max Hirsch died on April 3, 1969, at the age of 88. His son, Buddy Hirsch, took over the stable.

Buddy sent Gallant Bloom to California, where she won top stakes at the age of four. But returning to race at tracks in the U.S. Northeast, she finally lost in the Nassau County Handicap. It was discovered she was developing a chip in her ankle, which put an end to her racing career.

== Breeding record ==
As a brood mare, Gallant Bloom puzzled veterinarians. She produced four foals, aborted one, and then became barren no matter what was tried. She had one last foal late in her life but nothing that came close to her.

Gallant Bloom lay down in her paddock at King Ranch, Kentucky, and died in 1991. She was twenty five years old. She is buried at Old Frankfort Place in Midway, Kentucky.
