= Fair Hill =

Fair Hill may refer to

== Places ==
- Fair Hill, Appleby-in-Westmorland (where the Appleby Horse Fair takes place), Cumbria, England
- Fair Hill, Maryland, United States
- Fair Hill, Penrith, Cumbria, England
- Fairhill, Cork, Republic of Ireland

== Other uses ==
- Fair Hill Railroad; a defunct railroad in Pennsylvania
- Fair Hill Training Center; a racehorse training center in Maryland
