= Montpelier Stable =

Montpelier Stable may refer to two different Thoroughbred horse racing stables:

- Montpelier Stable of Richard Thornton Wilson, Jr. (1866–1929)
- Montpelier Stable of Marion duPont Scott (1894–1983)
