= Rosemont (horse) =

American-bred Thoroughbred racehorse

- Sire: The Porter
- Grandsire: Sweep
- Dam: Garden Rose
- Damsire: Colin
- Sex: Stallion
- Foaled: 1932
- Country: United States
- Colour: Bay
- Breeder: William du Pont, Jr.
- Owner: Foxcatcher Farms
- Trainer: Richard E. Handlen
- Record: 23: 7-6-3
- Earnings: US$168,750

Major wins
- Eastern Shore Handicap (1934); Withers Stakes (1935); Narragansett Special (1936); San Antonio Handicap (1937); Santa Anita Handicap (1937)

Rosemont (foaled 1932 in Virginia; died on March 23, 1961, in Virginia) was an American Thoroughbred racehorse best known for his win in the 1937 Santa Anita Handicap, when he defeated the popular horse Seabiscuit. This race was featured in a scene in the motion picture Seabiscuit (2003).

Rosemont was bred by William du Pont, Jr. Du Pont purchased his dam while in foal in a dispersal sale, and got Rosemont when she gave birth. He was trained by Richard E. Handlen and raced under du Pont's Foxcatcher Farm stables. Among his other wins, Rosemont defeated the Triple Crown winner Omaha in winning the 1935 Withers Stakes at Belmont Park before a crowd of 25,000.

Following his retirement from racing, Rosemont stood at stud at William duPont's Walnut Hall Farm near Boyce, Virginia, where he had been foaled in 1932. Of his progeny, the most notable are Bed O' Roses, a U.S. Racing Hall of Fame inductee, and Berlo, the 1960 American Champion Three-Year-Old Filly.

== Sire line tree ==
- Rosemont
  - Isasmoothie
  - Thinking Cap
    - Smart
