= James G. Rowe Jr. =

American horse trainer (1889–1931)

Personal information
- Born: June 16, 1889 Brooklyn, New York
- Died: October 1, 1931 (aged 42) Baltimore, Maryland
- Occupation: Trainer

Horse racing career
- Sport: Horse racing

Major racing wins
- Chesapeake Stakes (1922, 1931); Gazelle Stakes (1923); Kentucky Oaks (1923); Brookdale Handicap (1928); Champlain Handicap (1928); Shevlin Stakes (1928); Withers Stakes (1928); Belmont Futurity Stakes (1929); Hopeful Stakes (1929); Matron Stakes (1929); National Stallion Stakes (1929); Saratoga Special Stakes (1929); Travers Stakes (1929, 1931); Autumn Days Stakes (1930); Ardsley Handicap (1930); Blemton Handicap (1930); Cowdin Stakes (1930); Victoria Stakes (1930); Whitney Handicap (1930, 1931); Chesapeake Stakes (1931); Jockey Club Gold Cup (1931); Kings County Handicap (1931); Saratoga Cup (1931); Wood Memorial Stakes (1931); Dwyer Stakes (1931); Lawrence Realization Stakes (1931) American Classic Race wins: Preakness Stakes (1928); Kentucky Derby (1931); Belmont Stakes (1931)

Racing awards
- United States Champion Thoroughbred Trainer by earnings (1929)

Significant horses
- Twenty Grand, Untidy, Victorian

James Gordon Rowe Jr. (June 16, 1889 – October 21, 1931) was an American Thoroughbred horse trainer.

== Biography ==
The son of U.S. Hall of Fame trainer James G. Rowe Sr., he initially planned to become a mechanical engineer and graduated from Fordham and Cornell universities. However, in 1913 he went to work for his father as an assistant and later became an assistant to Scott Harlan at Helen Hay Whitney's Greentree Stable where by the mid-1920s he had several horses under his exclusive conditioning. In 1929, he took over from his father as head trainer for Harry Payne Whitney's Brookdale Farm. After Whitney died, James Rowe Jr. returned to work for Greentree Stable in the latter part of 1930, replacing Thomas W. Murphy.

== Triple Crown wins ==
Rowe Jr. won all three of the U.S. Triple Crown races. He trained the 1928 Preakness Stakes winner Victorian, and in 1929 was the Leading trainer in the United States by earnings with $314,881 in purse money.

Rowe Jr.'s most famous horse was the Hall of Fame inductee Twenty Grand with which he won the other two Triple Crown races in 1931 and earned American Horse of the Year honors. Twenty Grand won the Kentucky Derby, was second in the Preakness which was run before the Derby that year, and won the Belmont Stakes. Rowe Jr. lived for only a few months after these victories, dying at age 42 of a heart attack in October of that year. He was buried next to his father in Red Bank, New Jersey. One of five children, his brother, Belmont A. Rowe, who was also involved in horse racing, died at a young age in 1927.
