= American Champion Older Dirt Female Horse =

Award for American racehorses

The Eclipse Award for Champion Older Dirt Female Horse is an American Thoroughbred horse racing honor awarded annually to a filly or mare, four years old and up, for performances on dirt and main track racing surfaces. In 1971, it became part of the Eclipse Awards program as the award for Champion Older Female Horse.

In 1936 both the Turf & Sports Digest magazine and Daily Racing Form (DRF) began naming an annual champion. Starting in 1950, the Thoroughbred Racing Associations (TRA) began naming its own champion. The following list provides the name of the horses chosen by both of these organizations. Whenever there were different champions named, the horses are listed side-by-side with the one chosen as champion by the Daily Racing Form noted with the letters (DRF), the one chosen by the Thoroughbred Racing Associations by the letters (TRA) and the one chosen by Turf and Sports Digest by the letters (TSD).

Prior to 1971 this award was referred to as "Champion Female Handicap Horse" or "Champion Handicap Mare". The Daily Racing Form version was open to any female horse, and was given to some Champions at the age of three, such as Tosmah, Twilight Tear and Busher.

Champions from 1887 through 1935 were selected retrospectively by a panel of experts as published by The Blood-Horse magazine.

In 2015, the Daily Racing Form, the Thoroughbred Racing Associations, and the National Turf Writers Association decided that the award would be renamed and awarded to older female horses proficient in dirt and main track races.

== Honorees ==
=== Eclipse Award for Champion Older Dirt Female ===
| Year | Horse | Age | Trainer | Owner |
|---|---|---|---|---|
| 2025 | Thorpedo Anna | 4 | Kenneth McPeek | Hill 'n' Dale Farms, Mark Edwards, Judy Hicks, Magdalena Racing |
| 2024 | Idiomatic | 5 | Brad H. Cox | Juddmonte Farms |
| 2023 | Idiomatic | 4 | Brad H. Cox | Juddmonte Farms |
| 2022 | Malathaat | 4 | Todd A. Pletcher | Shadwell Stable |
| 2021 | Letruska | 5 | Fausto Gutierrez | St. George Stable |
| 2020 | Monomoy Girl | 5 | Brad H. Cox | Michael Dubb, Monomoy Stables, The Elkstone Group and Bethlehem Stables |
| 2019 | Midnight Bisou | 4 | Steven Asmussen | Bloom Racing |
| 2018 | Unique Bella | 4 | Jerry Hollendorfer | Don Alberto Stable |
| 2017 | Forever Unbridled | 5 | Dallas Stewart | Charles E. Fipke |
| 2016 | Beholder | 6 | Richard Mandella | Spendthrift Farm |
| 2015 | Beholder | 5 | Richard Mandella | Spendthrift Farm |
| 2014 | Close Hatches | 4 | William I. Mott | Juddmonte Farms |
| 2013 | Royal Delta | 5 | William I. Mott | Besilu Stables |
| 2012 | Royal Delta | 4 | William I. Mott | Besilu Stables |
| 2011 | Havre de Grace | 4 | J. Larry Jones | Rick Porter/Fox Hill Farms |
| 2010 | Zenyatta | 6 | John Shirreffs | Ann & Jerry Moss |
| 2009 | Zenyatta | 5 | John Shirreffs | Ann & Jerry Moss |
| 2008 | Zenyatta | 4 | John Shirreffs | Ann & Jerry Moss |
| 2007 | Ginger Punch | 4 | Robert J. Frankel | Stronach Stables |
| 2006 | Fleet Indian | 5 | Todd A. Pletcher | Paul H. Saylor |
| 2005 | Ashado | 4 | Todd A. Pletcher | Jonabell Farm |
| 2004 | Azeri | 6 | D. Wayne Lukas | Allen E. Paulson Living Trust |
| 2003 | Azeri | 5 | Laura de Seroux | Allen E. Paulson Living Trust |
| 2002 | Azeri | 4 | Laura de Seroux | Allen E. Paulson Living Trust |
| 2001 | Gourmet Girl | 6 | Pico Perdomo | Gary A. Tanaka |
| 2000 | Riboletta | 5 | Eduardo Inda | Aaron & Marie Jones |
| 1999 | Beautiful Pleasure | 4 | John T. Ward, Jr. | John C. Oxley |
| 1998 | Escena | 5 | William I. Mott | Allen E. Paulson |
| 1997 | Hidden Lake | 4 | John C. Kimmel | Tracy Farmer & Robert N. Clay |
| 1996 | Jewel Princess | 4 | Wallace Dollase | M. & R. Stephen/Thoroughbred Corp. |
| 1995 | Inside Information | 4 | C. R. McGaughey III | Ogden Mills Phipps |
| 1994 | Sky Beauty | 4 | H. Allen Jerkens | Georgia E. Hoffman |
| 1993 | Paseana | 6 | Ron McAnally | Jenny & Sidney Craig |
| 1992 | Paseana | 5 | Ron McAnally | Jenny & Sidney Craig |
| 1991 | Queena | 5 | C. R. McGaughey III | Emory G. Alexander |
| 1990 | Bayakoa | 6 | Ron McAnally | Janis & Frank Whitham |
| 1989 | Bayakoa | 5 | Ron McAnally | Janis & Frank Whitham |
| 1988 | Personal Ensign | 4 | C. R. McGaughey III | Ogden Phipps |
| 1987 | North Sider | 5 | D. Wayne Lukas | D. W. Lukas & Paul Paternostro |
| 1986 | Lady's Secret | 4 | D. Wayne Lukas | M/M Eugene Klein |
| 1985 | Life's Magic | 4 | D. Wayne Lukas | Mel Hatley & Eugene Klein |
| 1984 | Princess Rooney | 4 | Neil D. Drysdale | Paula J. Tucker |
| 1983 | Ambassador of Luck | 4 | Mitchell C. Preger | Envoy Stable |
| 1982 | Track Robbery | 6 | Robert L. Wheeler | Summa Stable |
| 1981 | Relaxing | 5 | Angel Penna, Sr. | Ogden Phipps |
| 1980 | Glorious Song | 4 | Gerry Belanger | F. Stronach & N. B. Hunt |
| 1979 | Waya | 5 | David A. Whiteley | P. M. Brant & G. W. Strawbridge, Jr. |
| 1978 | Late Bloomer | 4 | John M. Gaver Jr. | Greentree Stable |
| 1977 | Cascapedia | 4 | Gordon C. Campbell | Bernard J. Ridder |
| 1976 | Proud Delta | 4 | Marion duPont Scott | Peter M. Howe |
| 1975 | Susan's Girl | 6 | L. R. Fenstermaker | Fred W. Hooper |
| 1974 | Desert Vixen | 4 | Thomas F. Root, Sr. | Harry T. Mangurian, Jr. |
| 1973 | Susan's Girl | 4 | Charles R. Parke | Fred W. Hooper |
| 1972 | Typecast | 6 | A. Thomas Doyle | Fletcher R. Jones |
| 1971 | Shuvee | 5 | Willard C. Freeman | Anne Minor Stone |

=== Daily Racing Form, Turf & Sport Digest and Thoroughbred Racing Association Awards ===
| Year | Horse | Age | Trainer | Owner |
|---|---|---|---|---|
| 1970 | Shuvee | 4 | Willard C. Freeman | Anne Minor Stone |
| 1969 | Gallant Bloom (DRF) | 3 | William J. Hirsch | Robert J. Kelberg, Jr. |
| 1969 | Gamely (TRA) | 5 | James W. Maloney | William Haggin Perry |
| 1968 | Gamely | 4 | James W. Maloney | William Haggin Perry |
| 1967 | Straight Deal II | 5 | Hirsch Jacobs | Ethel D. Jacobs |
| 1966 | Open Fire (DRF) | 5 | Virgil W. Raines | Brandywine Stable |
| 1966 | Summer Scandal (TRA) | 4 | Woods Garth | Harborvale Stable |
| 1965 | Old Hat | 6 | Charles C. Norman | Stanley Conrad |
| 1964 | Tosmah (DRF) | 3 | Joseph W. Mergler | Briardale Farm |
| 1964 | Old Hat (TRA) | 5 | Charles C. Norman | Stanley Conrad |
| 1963 | Cicada | 4 | Casey Hayes | Christopher Chenery |
| 1962 | Primonetta | 4 | James P. Conway | Darby Dan Farm |
| 1961 | Airmans Guide | 4 | Burton Williams | Hugh A. Grant, Sr. |
| 1960 | Royal Native | 4 | Peter F. Gacicia | William B. MacDonald |
| 1959 | Tempted | 4 | Henry S. Clark | Mooring Stable |
| 1958 | Bornastar | 5 | W. Graves Sparks | J. Graham Brown |
| 1957 | Pucker Up | 4 | James P. Conway | Ada L. Rice |
| 1956 | Blue Sparkler | 4 | Harry M. Wells | Amory L. Haskell |
| 1955 | Misty Morn (DRF) | 3 | James E. Fitzsimmons | Wheatley Stable |
| 1955 | Parlo (TRA) | 4 | Richard E. Handlen | William du Pont, Jr. |
| 1954 | Parlo (DRF) | 3 | Richard E. Handlen | William du Pont, Jr. |
| 1954 | Lavender Hill (TRA) | 5 | Tommy Kelley | Mrs. Charles Silvers |
| 1953 | Sickle's Image | 5 | Clarence W. Hartwick | Clarence W. Hartwick |
| 1952 | Real Delight (DRF) | 3 | Horace A. Jones | Calumet Farm |
| 1952 | Next Move (TRA) | 5 | William C. Winfrey | Alfred G. Vanderbilt II |
| 1951 | Bed o' Roses | 4 | William C. Winfrey | Alfred G. Vanderbilt II |
| 1950 | Two Lea | 4 | Horace A. Jones | Calumet Farm |

=== Daily Racing Form and Turf & Sport Digest Awards ===
| Year | Horse | Age | Trainer | Owner |
|---|---|---|---|---|
| 1949 | Bewitch | 4 | Ben A. Jones | Calumet Farm |
| 1948 | Conniver | 4 | William Post | Harry La Montagne |
| 1947 | But Why Not | 3 | Max Hirsch | King Ranch |
| 1946 | Gallorette | 4 | Edward A. Christmas | William L. Brann |
| 1945 | Busher | 3 | George M. Odom | Louis B. Mayer |
| 1944 | Twilight Tear | 3 | Ben A. Jones | Calumet Farm |
| 1943 | Mar-Kell | 4 | Ben A. Jones | Calumet Farm |
| 1942 | Vagrancy | 3 | James E. Fitzsimmons | Belair Stud |
| 1941 | Fairy Chant | 4 | Richard E. Handlen | William du Pont Jr. |
| 1940 | War Plumage | 4 | Howard Oots | James Cox Brady Jr. |
| 1939 | Lady Maryland | 5 | not found | Gustave Ring |
| 1938 | Esposa | 6 | Matthew P. Brady | William Ziegler Jr. |
| 1938 | Marica | 5 | Howard Wells | Thomas D. Taggart |
| 1937 | Esposa | 5 | Matthew P. Brady | William Ziegler Jr. |
| 1936 | Myrtlewood | 4 | Ray Kindred | Brownell Combs |

=== The Blood-Horse retrospective champions ===
| Year | Horse | Age | Trainer | Owner |
|---|---|---|---|---|
| 1935 | Late Date | 6 | Aaron Frost | Brentwood Stable |
| 1935 | Some Pomp | 4 | Bert B. Williams | Calumet Farm |
| 1934 | Advising Anna | 4 | Jack Howard | Mrs. Anna Howard |
| 1933 | Rambour | 5 | Preston M. Burch | Preston M. Burch |
| 1932 | Tred Avon | 4 | William Irvine | Sylvester W. Labrot |
| 1931 | Valenciennes | 4 | Willie Knapp | Fannie Hertz |
| 1930 | Lady Broadcast | 4 | John M. Goode | Roger Caldwell |
| 1929 | Bateau | 4 | Scott P. Harlan | Walter M. Jeffords |
| 1928 | Black Maria | 5 | William H. Karrick | William R. Coe |
| 1927 | Black Maria | 4 | William H. Karrick | William R. Coe |
| 1926 | Princess Doreen | 5 | Kay Spence | Audley Farm Stable |
| 1925 | Princess Doreen | 4 | Kay Spence | Audley Farm Stable |
| 1924 | Chacolet | 6 | Will Buford | Hal Price Headley |
| 1923 | Chacolet | 5 | Will Buford | Hal Price Headley |
| 1922 | Careful | 4 | Eugene Wayland | Walter J. Salmon, Sr. |
| 1921 | My Dear | 4 | Fred Musante | Fred Musante |
| 1920 | Milkmaid | 4 | H. Guy Bedwell | J. K. L. Ross |
