= Bateau (horse) =

American-bred Thoroughbred racehorse

- Sire: Man o' War
- Grandsire: Fair Play
- Dam: Escuina
- Damsire: Ecouen
- Sex: Filly
- Foaled: 1925
- Country: United States
- Colour: Bay
- Breeder: Walter M. Jeffords, Sr.
- Owner: Walter M. Jeffords, Sr.
- Trainer: Scott P. Harlan
- Record: 35: 11-5-9
- Earnings: US$120,760

Major wins
- Fashion Stakes (1927); Selima Stakes (1927); Coaching Club American Oaks (1928); Gazelle Stakes (1928); Suburban Handicap (1929); Whitney Handicap (1929); Autumn Handicap (1929)

Awards
- American Champion Three-Year-Old Filly (1928); American Champion Older Female Horse (1929)
- Last updated on December 10, 2010

Bateau (born 1925) was an American Thoroughbred Champion racehorse and a daughter of Man o' War and out of the French mare Escuina.

In the Schuylerville Purse run at Saratoga Springs in late July 1927, the filly placed second to Pennant Queen. She ran in a juvenile special at Saratoga Race Course in August 1927 as a 2-year-old. In a field of thirteen, Bateau, owned by Walter M. Jeffords, Sr., lost by a length, again to Pennant Queen, a daughter of Pennant and Misty Queen.

On November 4, 1927, Bateau was ridden by Earl Sande, a noted jockey of the 1920s. Sande was suspended from horse racing, stripped of his racing badge, and ejected from the Pimlico Race Course after race stewards ruled that he intentionally fouled Reigh Count during the Pimlico Futurity feature race. Aboard Bateau, Sand tried unsuccessfully to elbow Reigh Count into the rail as the colt and Bateau came into the home stretch ahead of fifteen other horses. The filly came in third following Glade and Petee-Wrack. The Maryland Racing Commission reinstated Sande during a special meeting on March 22, 1928.

On June 1, 1929, Bateau defeated male competitors to win the Suburban Handicap at Belmont Park with a time of 2:03 2/5. The event for older thoroughbreds also included Petee-Wrack, owned by John R. Macomber. This 4-year-old colt finished second, a head back of Bateau. Bateau's winning purse was $14,100. That year she also won the Whitney Handicap at Saratoga Race Course and the Autumn Handicap at Havre de Grace Racetrack.
