= Berlo =

American-bred Thoroughbred racehorse

- Sire: Heliopolis
- Grandsire: Hyperion
- Dam: Faberose
- Damsire: Rosemont
- Sex: Filly
- Foaled: 1957
- Country: United States
- Colour: Brown
- Breeder: William duPont, Jr.
- Owner: Foxcatcher Farms
- Trainer: Richard E. Handlen
- Record: 14: 8-0-2
- Earnings: US$208,186

Major wins
- Beldame Handicap (1960); Coaching Club American Oaks (1960); Gazelle Stakes (1960); Ladies Handicap (1960); Mother Goose Stakes (1960)

Awards
- American Champion Three-Year-Old Filly (1960)

Berlo (foaled April 10, 1957 in Virginia) was an American Thoroughbred Champion racehorse.

== Background ==
Berlo was a brown mare bred by William duPont, Jr. at his Walnut Hall Farm near Boyce, Virginia. She was out of the mare Faberose, a daughter of duPont's Santa Anita Handicap winner, Rosemont. Her sire was the good British runner Heliopolis, a son of the six-time Leading sire in Great Britain and Ireland, Hyperion. Berlo was trained by Richard Handlen,

== Racing career ==
In 1960 Berlo won five major races including the Coaching Club American Oaks, the Beldame Handicap, and on October 12, the grueling mile and a half Ladies Handicap. at New York's Belmont Park. However, the next day her handlers announced she would not race again that year. Berlo's dominating performances earned her 1960 American Champion Three-Year-Old Filly honors.

Berlo did not return to racing for nearly nine months. Unable to be competitive, she did not win a major race in 1961.

== Breeding record ==
As a broodmare, Berlo met with little success, only Odd Dancer, a son by Native Dancer, was a minor race winner.
