= Richard E. Handlen =

American horse trainer

Personal information
- Born: March 25, 1897
- Died: June 2, 1963 (aged 66)
- Resting place: Melbourne Cemetery, Melbourne, Florida
- Occupation: Trainer

Horse racing career
- Sport: Horse racing

Major racing wins
- Withers Stakes (1935, 1946); Chesapeake Stakes (1936, 1946); Gazelle Handicap (1936, 1940, 1960); Great American Stakes (1936); Narragansett Special (1936); Delaware Handicap (1937, 1955); San Antonio Handicap (1937); Santa Anita Derby (1937); Santa Anita Handicap (1937); Beldame Stakes (1940, 1941, 1954, 1960); Black-Eyed Susan Stakes (1940); Everglades Stakes (1940); Pimlico Oaks (1940); Santa Margarita Handicap (1940); Juvenile Stakes (1942); National Stallion Stakes (1942); Tremont Stakes (1942); Lawrence Realization Stakes (1943); Diana Handicap (1945); Schuylerville Stakes (1948); Ladies Handicap (1949, 1960); Santa Susana Stakes (1949, 1960); Demoiselle Stakes (1951); Kent Stakes (1953); Alabama Stakes (1954); Delaware Oaks (1954); Discovery Handicap (1954); Firenze Handicap (1954); Saratoga Cup (1955); Top Flight Handicap (1955); Dixie Stakes (1956); Hopeful Stakes (1957); Beldame Stakes (1960); Coaching Club American Oaks (1960); Mother Goose Stakes (1960); American Classic Race wins: Preakness Stakes (1938)

Honors
- Delaware Park Wall of Fame (2016)

Significant horses
- Berlo, Chevation, Dauber, Fairy Chant, Parlo, Rosemont
- Updated on April 21, 2010

Richard E. Handlen (March 25, 1897 - June 2, 1963) was an American Thoroughbred horse racing trainer whom the March 15, 1937 edition of the Los Angeles Times called "one of the best trainers in America"

== Racing career ==
Early in his career, Richard Handlen worked for U.S. Racing Hall of Fame trainer Preston M. Burch while he was in charge of William du Pont, Jr.'s Foxcatcher Farm racing stable in the early 1930s. Handlen took over the Foxcatcher stable and began winning important races by 1935. He would remain in that position through 1960.

In 1937, Richard Handlen became the only trainer in history to win the two most prestigious races in California at Santa Anita Park when he won the Santa Anita Derby with Fairy Hill and the Santa Anita Handicap with Rosemont. Through 2009, his record remains intact. The following year, Richard Handlen trained Dauber to a victory in the 1938 Preakness Stakes after finishing second in the Kentucky Derby. Dauber then went on to run second to Pasteurized in the Belmont Stakes.

Richard Handlen was inducted into the Delaware Park Wall of Fame in 2016.

== Champions ==
Richard Handlen conditioned Foxcatcher Farm horses to six American championships:

- Fairy Chant - 1940 American Champion Three-Year-Old Filly (1940) and 1941 American Champion Older Female Horse
- Parlo - 1954 American Champion Three-Year-Old Filly and the 1954 and 1955 American Champion Older Female Horse.
- Berlo - 1960 American Champion Three-Year-Old Filly.

== Wartime military service ==
Richard Handlen's military tombstone states that he served with the United States military in World War I as part of the Farrier Medical Department.

Richard Handlen was living in Florida at the time of his death in 1963.
