= Untidy =

American Thoroughbred racehorse

- Sire: Sweep
- Grandsire: Ben Brush
- Dam: Cafe Au Lait
- Damsire: Meddler
- Sex: Mare
- Foaled: 1920
- Country: United States
- Colour: Bay
- Breeder: Greentree Stud
- Owner: Greentree Stable
- Trainer: James G. Rowe Jr. & Scott Harlan
- Record: 23 starts, 4 wins
- Earnings: US$29,215

Major wins
- Alabama Stakes (1923); Gazelle Stakes (1963); Kentucky Oaks (1923)

Awards
- American Champion Three-Year-Old Filly (1923)

Untidy (foaled 1920 in New Jersey) was an American Thoroughbred filly racehorse owned by Helen Hay Whitney's Greentree Stable and trained by Jimmy Rowe Jr. and head trainer Scott Harlan. Untidy's performance in 1923 would see her named in retrospective as the American Champion Three-Year-Old Filly.

== Racing career ==
A winner at age two of a maiden race, Untidy came into her own at age three. She was trained by Jimmy Rowe Jr. for her wins in the Kentucky Oaks and Gazelle Stakes. In August, Greentree Stables' head trainer Scott Harlan took over and was the trainer of record for Untidy's win in the Alabama Stakes.

A filly about whom racing publications frequently remarked on her beauty, in addition to her wins in important stakes races Untidy regularly ran against her male counterparts in top level races. She notably ran second in the 1923 Manhattan Handicap and second to that year's Kentucky Derby winner and future U.S. Racing Hall of Fame colt Zev in the Lawrence Realization Stakes.

== Broodmare ==
In the spring of 1924 Unity was sent to stand as a broodmare at the famous Rancocas Stud in Jobstown, New Jersey. Of her offspring, the most successful in racing was First Minstrel, a winner for Greentree Stable of the Junior Champion and Sanford Stakes in 1933.

== Pedigree ==
Pedigree of Untidy, bay filly, 1920
Sire Sweep	Ben Brush	Bramble	Bonnie Scotland
Sire Sweep	Ben Brush	Bramble	Ivy Leaf
Sire Sweep	Ben Brush	Roseville	Reform
Sire Sweep	Ben Brush	Roseville	Albia
Sire Sweep	Pink Domino	Domino	Himyar
Sire Sweep	Pink Domino	Domino	Mannie Gray
Sire Sweep	Pink Domino	Belle Rose	Beaudesert
Sire Sweep	Pink Domino	Belle Rose	Monte Rosa
Dam Cafe Au Lait	Meddler	St. Gatien	The Rover
Dam Cafe Au Lait	Meddler	St. Gatien	Saint Editha
Dam Cafe Au Lait	Meddler	Busybody	Petrarch
Dam Cafe Au Lait	Meddler	Busybody	Spinaway
Dam Cafe Au Lait	Gunfire	Hastings	Spendthrift
Dam Cafe Au Lait	Gunfire	Hastings	Cinderella
Dam Cafe Au Lait	Gunfire	Royal Gun	Royal Hampton
Dam Cafe Au Lait	Gunfire	Royal Gun	Spring Gun (family: 1-h)
