= William du Pont =

Member of the Delaware Du Pont family

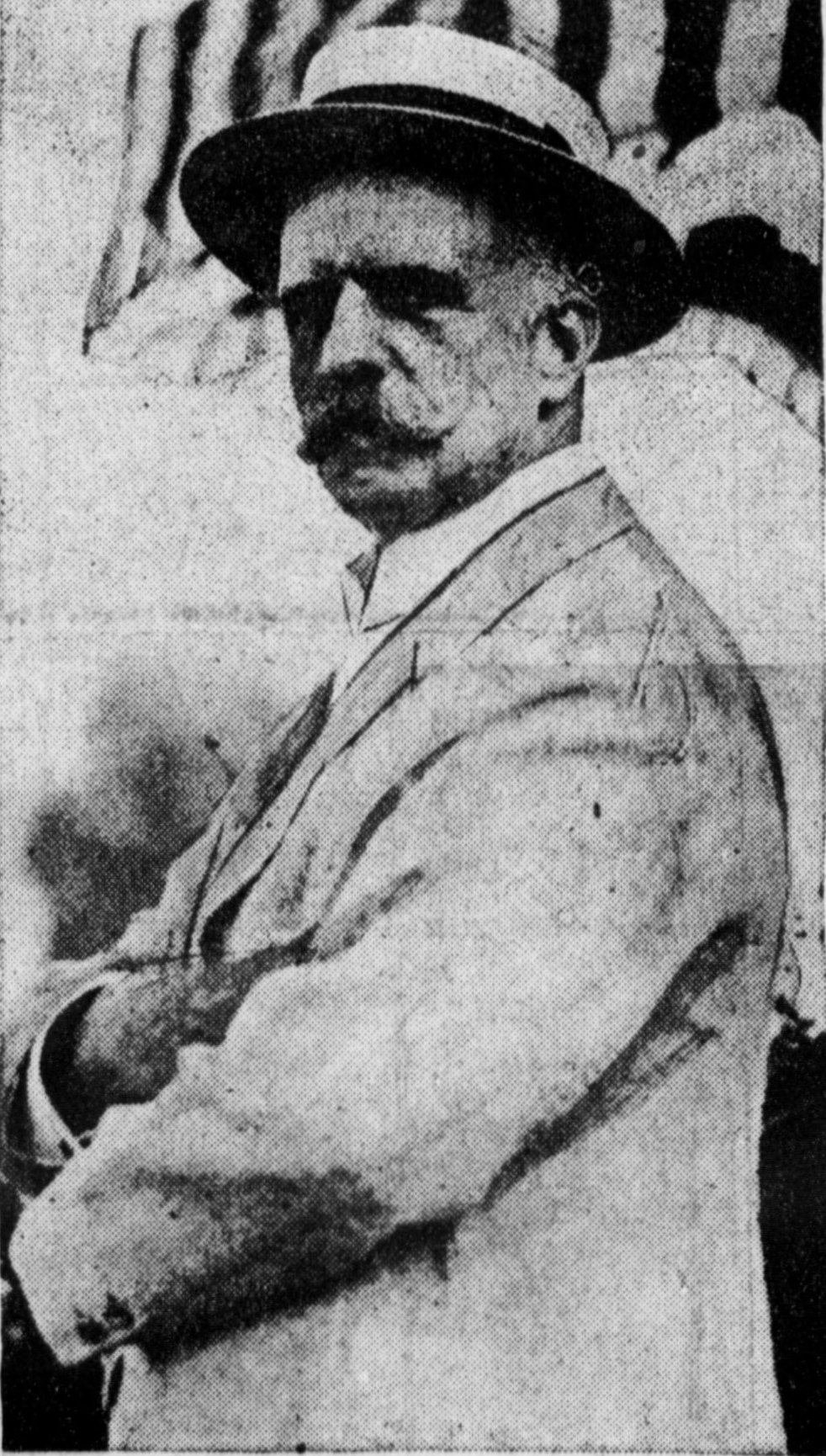
- du Pont in 1915
- Born: August 21, 1855; Wilmington, Delaware, United States
- Died: January 20, 1928 (aged 72); Altama, near Brunswick, Georgia; United States
- Spouses: May Lammot du Pont (1878-1892); Annie Rogers Zinn (1892-1927), her death
- Children: with Annie: William du Pont, Jr.; Marion duPont Scott
- Parent(s): Henry du Pont & Louisa Gerhard

William du Pont (August 21, 1855 – January 20, 1928) was a member of the Delaware Du Pont family. He was the youngest son of General Henry du Pont (1812-1889) and Louisa Gerhard du Pont (1816-1900).

== Life and career ==
Du Pont married twice, first in 1878 to his cousin May Lammot du Pont (1854-1927), the daughter of Victor du Pont (1828-1888) and Alice Hounsfield du Pont (1833-1904). William and May divorced in 1892. In June of that year, he married Annie Rogers Zinn, the daughter of the locomotive maker Theodore Rogers (d. November 18, 1871) and Mary Andrews Rogers (d. March 11, 1918); Annie was the divorced wife of George Zinn. William and Annie had two children, William du Pont, Jr. and Marion duPont Scott.

In 1878, at age 17, du Pont became a member of the Wilmington and Northern Railroad Company and was put in charge of all the farms that belonged to the company. He also served as secretary and treasurer of Repauno Chemical Company, of which Lammot du Pont I was president before his accidental death by a nitroglycerine explosion in 1884. After Lammot du Pont I's death, du Pont became president of both Repauno Chemical Company and Hercules Powder Company, which was owned by the Du Pont Company.
