= Marion duPont Scott =

American philanthropist and horse breeder (1894–1983)

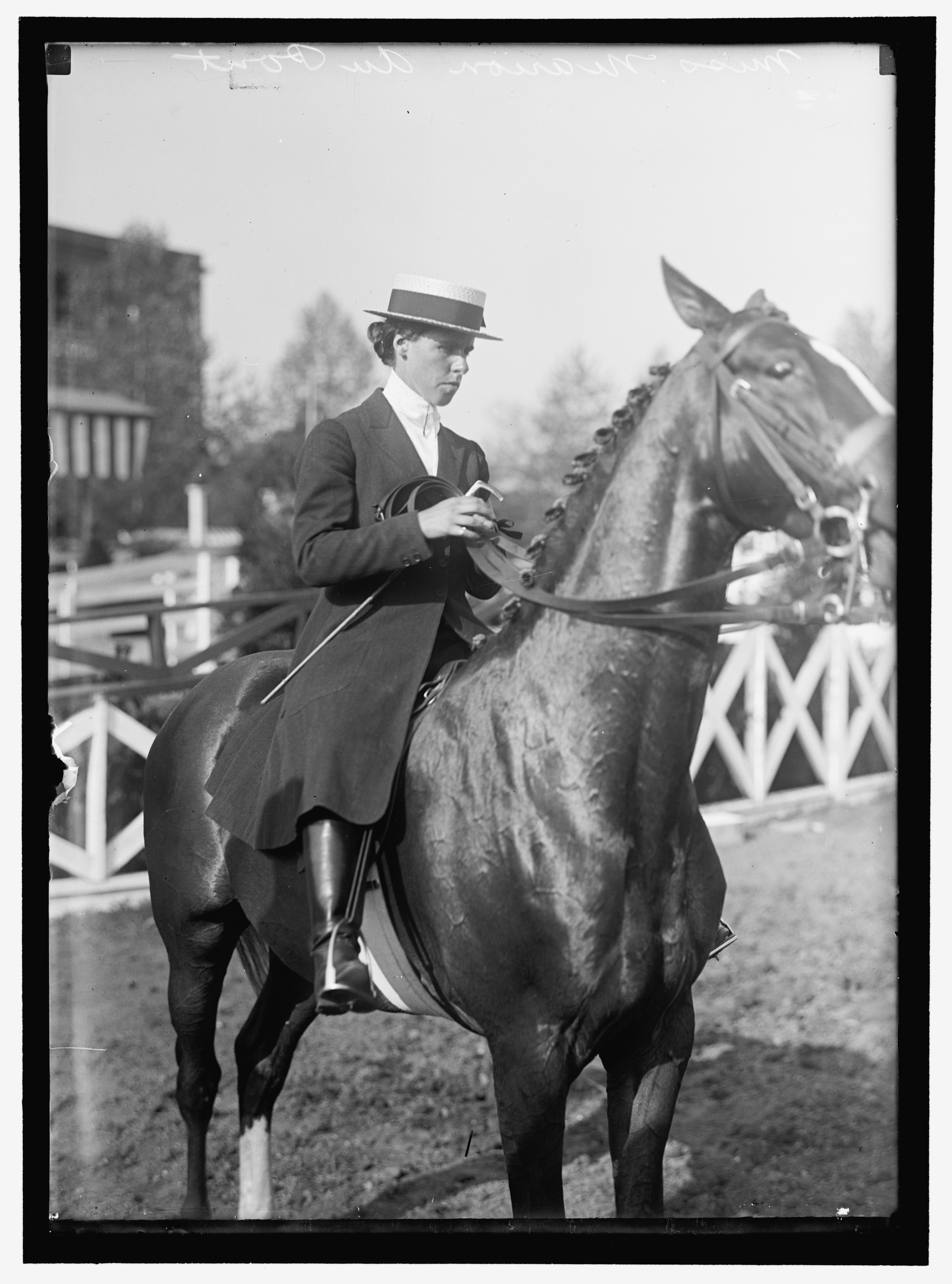
At a horse show in 1916

Marion duPont Scott (May 3, 1894 – September 4, 1983) was a thoroughbred horsebreeder who operated a racing stable for both flat and steeplechase racing. She was the last private owner of Montpelier, the mansion and land estate of former United States President James Madison.

At the time of her death, she bequeathed Montpelier to the National Trust for Historic Preservation and established an endowment for its maintenance; it had been designated a National Historic Landmark. During the National Trust's 2003–2008 major restoration of the mansion to its design during the time of Madison's residency, the house was reduced from the 55-room structure developed by the du Pont family back to its original 22 rooms.

== Biography ==
Marion was born in Wilmington, Delaware, the daughter of William du Pont and his second wife, Annie Rogers, the former wife of George Zinn, Sr. She had one sibling, William duPont, Jr., and a half-brother, George Zinn, Jr. She spent her childhood at Binfield, Berkshire, England. She was a great-granddaughter of Eleuthère Irénée du Pont. Of French Huguenot descent, the Du Pont family usually spell the family name as "du Pont" in the French style. Both Marion and her brother William, Jr. chose to spell their surname conjoined.

Marion grew up riding in the hunt country of Virginia and became an accomplished horsewoman. She became interested in racing as well and developed what became known as the Montpelier Stable. She owned and bred Thoroughbreds for both flat and steeplechase racing.

In addition, she and her brother William developed a number of racing venues, including Delaware Park, which he designed in 1937 in Delaware; Fair Hill, home to the National Steeplechase Association Headquarters and its race course in Maryland, on more than 5,000 acres of land formerly owned by William duPont Jr.; and the Springdale Race Course, Camden, South Carolina, home of the Carolina Cup and the Colonial Cup races.

In 1934, she and her brother William founded the Montpelier Steeplechase Hunt Races, held on the grounds of the estate. They are held the first Saturday in November each year at the Montpelier horse racing steeplechase course. It is a National Steeplechase Association event.

Marion was married to Thomas Hugh Somerville (1895–1963), an inspector with E. I. du Pont de Nemours & Co. He was a son of Samuel Wilson Somerville of Culpeper, Virginia. They married on 26 December 1925 and divorced in 1935. They had no children.

Secondly, she married Randolph Scott, an American movie actor, in 1936. He had been best man at her first wedding. They divorced in 1939; they had no children.

She also owned the 25-acre Holly Hedge estate in Camden, South Carolina, from 1944 until her death in 1983. This large antebellum home was built in 1835 and included a modern ten-stall horse barn. She purchased the Springdale Race Course in Camden as well and also owned a large equine training facility there. Her legacy lives in Camden with the annual steeplechase "Marion duPont Scott's Colonial Cup" that she founded in 1970. Scott Park adjacent to her previous training facility is a city park on land that she donated to the city. Battleship Road in Camden is named after her famous horse.

In 1976, she compiled and published her book "Montpelier-The Recollections of Marion duPont Scott," with help from writer Gerald Strine. Marion Scott had additions made to Montpelier for her own use, including wings that brought the total of rooms up to 55. At her death in 1983, Marion had bequeathed the estate, designated a National Historic Landmark, to the National Trust for Historic Preservation. Her father's will had said that if she were childless, the property would be inherited by her brother and his children. Her will included a provision for his children to sell or give their interests in the property to the National Trust or forfeit their share of a separate $3.1 million trust. In addition, she provided $10 million to the National Trust to buy the property and to establish an endowment. As her brother had died in 1965, his five children inherited Montpelier. Although two nephews sued the National Trust in an effort to break the will, they finally sold their interests in 1984.

After acquiring the property, the National Trust for Historic Preservation restored the property in the 2000s to its appearance when occupied by James and Dolley Madison in the early 1800s, reducing its size to the original 22 rooms and re-acquiring some of the original furnishings.

== Montpelier Stable ==
Marion Scott owned Thoroughbred racehorses that competed under her nom de course, Montpelier Stable, in both flat racing and steeplechase. The graves and tombstones of three of her racehorses lie to the left of the Montpelier mansion. Battleship and Annapolis were sons of Man o' War. Battleship is the only horse in history to win both the American Grand National and the British Grand National steeplechase races.

=== Awards ===
Scott's horse Mongo was voted the 1963 American Champion Male Turf Horse. Following the creation of the Eclipse Awards in 1971, her horse Soothsayer was voted the 1972 American Champion Steeplechase Horse. In 1976 Proud Delta was voted American Champion Older Female Horse.

=== Equine medical center ===
Scott bequeathed funds to Virginia Tech to establish an equine medical center, which was founded in 1984 in Leesburg. Her gift stipulated that the Westmoreland Davis Memorial Foundation, which operates Morven Park, offer 200 acres for the center. At the end of the 100-year agreement, the land will revert to Morven Park. The Marion duPont Scott Equine Medical Center is a full-service equine hospital which offers advanced specialty care, 24-hour emergency treatment and diagnostic services for all ages and breeds of horses. The hospital sees approximately 3,000 horses annually, and employs 120 equine healthcare professionals. It is affiliated with the Virginia–Maryland Regional College of Veterinary Medicine.

== Legacy ==
- 1973, Marion Scott received the Thoroughbred Breeders of Kentucky Award
- 1981, the National Turf Writers Association voted to give her the Joe Palmer Award for meritorious service and outstanding achievement in racing.
- Scott donated her important collection of books and periodicals on the history and practice of equestrian and related sports to the University of Virginia's Albert and Shirley Small Special Collections Library, together with an endowment fund to maintain and expand the collection.
- 1983, by her will, she bequeathed Montpelier to the National Trust for Historic Preservation, as well as $10 million to provide for the trust to buy the interests of her nieces and nephews, if necessary, as well as to establish an endowment for maintenance.
- During restoration of Montpelier, Scott's well-known "red room" with decorations and furniture was moved permanently to the estate's visitor center. It is available for viewing by the general public. The visitor center also displays several walls of photographs from Scott's distinguished Thoroughbred horse racing career.
