= Sherrill W. Ward =

American racehorse trainer

Personal information
- Born: March 24, 1911 Miami, Florida, United States
- Died: February 23, 1984 (aged 72)
- Occupation: Trainer

Horse racing career
- Sport: Horse racing

Major racing wins
- Aberdeen Stakes (1935); Toboggan Handicap (1938); Bahamas Stakes (1939); Cowdin Stakes (1954); Garden State Futurity (1954); Schuylerville Stakes (1954); Gallant Fox Handicap (1956); Lamplighter Handicap (1956); Vosburgh Stakes (1956, 1974); Frizette Stakes (1957); Gardenia Stakes (1957); Massachusetts Handicap (1957); Matron Stakes (1957); McLennan Handicap (1957); Gazelle Stakes (1958); Mother Goose Stakes (1958); Maskette Stakes (1959); Knickerbocker Handicap (1965); New York Handicap (1966); Sheepshead Bay Stakes (1967); Test Stakes (1967); Black Helen Handicap (1968); Excelsior Handicap (1969); Gulfstream Park Handicap (1974); Jockey Club Gold Cup (1974); Suburban Handicap (1975); Widener Handicap (1974, 1975); Woodward Stakes (1974, 1975); Brooklyn Handicap (1974, 1975); Carter Handicap (1974, 1975)

Racing awards
- Eclipse Award for Outstanding Trainer (1974)

Honours
- United States' Racing Hall of Fame (1978)

Significant horses
- Forego, Idun, Summer Tan

Sherrill W. Ward (March 14, 1911 – February 23, 1984) was an American Hall of Fame Thoroughbred racehorse trainer. Born in Miami, Florida, he was the son of trainer John Sherrill Ward. His brother, John T. Ward, also trained horses and ran Fort Springs Farm in Lexington, Kentucky. Having learned the business from his father, in 1929 Sherrill Ward embarked on a training career of his own.

Following the outbreak of World War II, Sherrill Ward served with the United States Armed Forces. After the war he resumed a training career that would see him condition Summer Tan to multiple stakes winning seasons for owner, Dorothy Firestone Galbreath. In 1957 and 1958, Ward trained Idun to back-to-back Championships, first as the American Champion Two-Year-Old Filly and then as the Three-Year-Old Champion. However, he earned his greatest acclaim as the trainer of Forego whose five Eclipse Awards under Ward's care included two Horse of the Year honors. In 1974, Ward was voted the Eclipse Award for Outstanding Trainer.

Health problems led to Sherrill Ward retiring in 1975 and turning over training of Forego to Frank Whiteley. In 1978, Ward was inducted into the United States' National Museum of Racing and Hall of Fame. He was living in a Hollywood, Florida nursing home at the time of his death in 1984.
