= Grecian Queen =

American-bred Thoroughbred racehorse

- Sire: Heliopolis
- Grandsire: Hyperion
- Dam: Qbania
- Damsire: Questionnaire
- Sex: Filly
- Foaled: 1950
- Country: United States
- Colour: Dark Bay/Brown
- Breeder: Ben F. Whitaker
- Owner: Florence Whitaker
- Trainer: James P. Conway
- Record: 53: 12-8-8
- Earnings: US$323,575

Major wins
- Astarita Stakes (1952); Demoiselle Stakes (1952); Marguerite Stakes (1952); Schuylerville Stakes (1952); Coaching Club American Oaks (1953); Gazelle Handicap (1953); Monmouth Oaks (1953); New Castle Handicap (1953); Prioress Stakes (1953)

Awards
- American Champion Three-Year-Old Filly (1953)

Grecian Queen (foaled in 1950) was an American Champion Thoroughbred racehorse. She was bred by Dallas, Texas businessman Ben Whitaker and raced under the name of his wife Florence. A consistently good and durable runner at age two and three, she won at distances from five and one half furlongs to a mile and three eighths.

== Racing at 2 ==
Trained by future U.S. Racing Hall of Fame inductee Jimmy Conway, Grecian Queen made her racing debut as a 2-year-old at Fair Grounds Race Course in New Orleans with a fourth-place finish in a maiden special weight event. She went on to considerable success that year, winning the 1952 Demoiselle Stakes at a mile and a sixteenth, the six furlong Astarita Stakes, and the five and one half furlong Schuylerville Purse at racetracks in New York as well as the mile and a sixteenth Marguerite Stakes at Pimlico Race Course. Grecian Queen finished behind Sweet Patootie in the balloting for 1952 American Champion Two-Year-Old Filly honors.

== A Champion at 3 ==
Grecian Queen was voted the American Champion Three-Year-Old Filly of 1953 in a year in which she won seven of twelve starts with wins in major races for fillies such as the Prioress Stakes. Gazelle Stakes, New Castle Handicap and Monmouth Oaks, At Belmont Park she won the mile and three-eighths Coaching Club American Oaks, at the time the most important race in the United States for three-year-old fillies that was often called the fillies derby.

Grecian Queen raced again at age four and five but could not win at the top levels with her best result a second-place finish in the 1954 Maskette Handicap at Saratoga Race Course in New York state.

== Broodmare ==
Bred to stallions such as Royal Charger, Tudor Minstrel, Nashua, and Raise a Native, Grecian Queen's offspring had only limited success in racing.
