= Scott Harlan =

American racehorse trainer and farm owner

Scott P. Harlan
Personal information
- Born: February 4, 1864 Columbia, Tennessee
- Died: January 1, 1948 (aged 83) Hatboro, Pennsylvania
- Occupations: Trainer, Owner

Horse racing career
- Sport: Horse racing

Major racing wins
- Walden Stakes (1920); Champlain Handicap (1921); Delaware Handicap (1921); Keene Memorial Stakes (1922); Scarsdale Handicap (1922, 1923); Alabama Stakes (1923); Empire City Handicap (1923); Jerome Hanicap (1923); Astoria Stakes (1925); Futurity Stakes (1926); Coaching Club American Oaks (1926, 1928); Latonia Oaks (1926); Pimlico Cup (1926, 1928); Pimlico Nursery Stakes (1926, 1929); Travers Stakes (1926); United States Hotel Stakes (1926); Bowie Handicap (1927); Dixie Stakes (1927); Fashion Stakes (1927); Saratoga Handicap (1927); Selima Stakes (1927); Coaching Club American Oaks (1928); Gazelle Stakes (1928); Aberdeen Stakes (1929); Autumn Handicap (1929); Suburban Handicap (1929); Whitney Handicap (1929)

Racing awards
- United States Champion Thoroughbred Trainer by earnings (1926)

Significant horses
- Bateau, Cherry Pie, Edith Cavell, Mars, Scapa Flow, Tryster, Untidy

Scott Paul Harlan (February 4, 1864 – January 1, 1948) was an American National Champion Thoroughbred racehorse trainer and owner of Idle Dell Farm near Hatboro, Pennsylvania.

== Career ==
During his career Scott Harlan trained for preeminent owners Walter Jeffords and the Greentree Stable of Helen Hay Whitney. For Whitney he trained Untidy to a performance in 1923 that saw her being named retrospectively as the American Champion Three-Year-Old Filly. Harlan had four other horses owned by Jeffords which would be voted National Champion honors.

In 1926 horses trained by Scott Harlan earned $205,681 which was the most earnings for any trainer in the United States. Among them, Scapa Flow earned American Champion Two-Year-Old Colt honors and Edith Cavell was named the American Champion Three-Year-Old Filly. Scott Harlan's third and fourth National Champion came with Bateau chosen the 1928 American Champion Three-Year-Old Filly then in 1929 American Champion Older Female Horse.

Scott Harlan had runners in five of the U.S. Triple Crown races with his best result a third in the 1926 Preakness Stakes with Walter M. Jeffords's colt Mars.

Among Harlan's notable wins was in the 1926 Pimlico Cup with Edith Cavell. She was ridden by the talented but ill-fated young jockey Ovila Bourassa who guided the filly to a three-length victory in track record time while beating a field of horses of either sex age three and older which included two future U.S. Racing Hall of Fame inductees, Crusader and Princess Doreen.

Scott Harlan died at age eighty-three on January 1, 1948. At the time of his death he had been living on his Idel Dell Farm in Hatboro, Pennsylvania.
