= Vagrancy (horse) =

American-bred Thoroughbred racehorse

- Sire: Sir Gallahad
- Grandsire: Teddy
- Dam: Valkyr
- Damsire: Man o' War
- Sex: Mare
- Foaled: 1939
- Country: United States
- Colour: Bay
- Breeder: Belair Stud Farm
- Owner: Belair Stud Farm
- Trainer: "Sunny" Jim Fitzsimmons
- Record: 42: 15-8-8
- Earnings: $ 102,480

Major wins
- Coaching Club American Oaks (1942); Pimlico Oaks (1942); Delaware Oaks (1942); Alabama Stakes (1942); Gazelle Stakes (1942); Test Stakes (1924); Beldame Stakes (1942); Ladies Handicap (1942)

Awards
- American Champion 3-Year-Old Filly (1942); American Champion Older Female Horse (1942)

Honours
- Vagrancy Handicap named in honor at Belmont Park

Vagrancy was an American Thoroughbred racehorse and broodmare.

== Background ==
Vagrancy was a bay filly born in 1939 out of Valkyr by Man o' War. She raced for Belair Stud and was trained for most of her career by "Sunny" Jim Fitzsimmons.

== Racing career ==
She was a promising winner at age two and then ran twenty-one times at age three, when she was named the 1942 American Champion Three-Year-Old Filly. She was also the champion "handicap" filly that season after beating the older crops in head-to-head races. At age three, she bloomed into the champion of her crop, winning nine stakes races that included the Coaching Club American Oaks, the Pimlico Oaks, the Delaware Oaks, the Alabama Stakes, the Gazelle Stakes and the Test Stakes against her own age, and the Beldame Handicap and Ladies Handicap against older fillies and mares. She compiled a record of ten wins, four seconds, and one third. She was first or second in eleven straight races against her own sex; her second against the boys came in the Lawrence Realization.

Vagrancy raced 42 times and hit the board in 31 of her starts. She won most of the most important stakes races in New York at the time for fillies, including the Ladies Handicap, the Alabama, the Test, the Coaching Club American Oaks, and the Gazelle. One of Vagrancy's most famous race was probably the Beldame Stakes in which she led for most of the race but was caught at the wire by Barrancosa; following a review of the photo, the race was declared a dead heat. From The Times: “William Woodward, of Belair Stud was chairman of the Jockey Club and breeder and owner of Vagrancy, flipped a coin in the unsaddling enclosure after the finish and thereby lost possession for the coming year of the Beldame Trophy. It will travel West to Bing Crosby and Lin Howard, owners of Binglin Stable and importers of Barrancosa.”

== Breeding record ==
During the 1940s, Vagrancy produced Black Tarquin, winner of English stakes races that ranged from the historic Gimcrack Stakes to the longest of the classics, the St. Leger Stakes. Her daughter Vulcania also became an important broodmare [2]. Another daughter, Natasha, was a major producer, and her daughter Natashka was Broodmare of the Year in 1981. In foaling Black Tarquin, she seemed to justify her importation. Black Tarquin was a huge colt that often demonstrated his brilliance by ascertaining victories in sprints, one-mile events, and marathons. He finished second in the Ascot Gold Cup, all told winning eight of fifteen starts and being recorded as England's champion three-year old of 1948.

== Honors ==
Vagrancy was rated the American Champion 3-Year-Old Filly in 1942 and the American Champion Older Female Horse in 1943.
