= Fair Hill Training Center =

Racehorce training center in MD, USA

Coordinates: 39°42′40″N 75°51′51″W

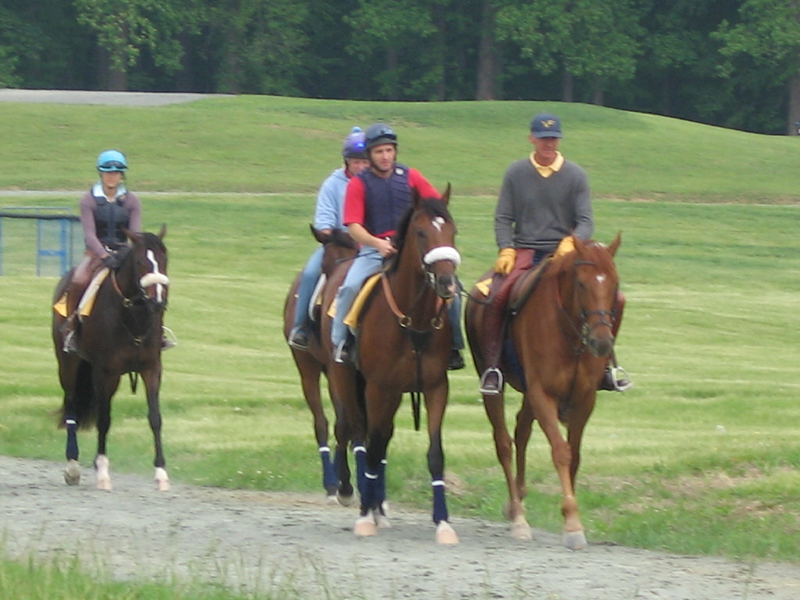
Barbaro walking to the track at Fair Hill a week after winning the Kentucky Derby.

Fair Hill Training Center is a racehorse training center based in Fair Hill, Maryland. It was owned by William du Pont, Jr. of the well-known Du Pont family, who bought the land in 1926. Dupont invested a substantial amount of money to make the property a leading breeding and training farm for his Thoroughbred racehorses. The State of Maryland purchased Fair Hill in 1974, converting the then 5,700-acre (23 km^{2}) property into an equine training complex and the Fair Hill Natural Resources Management Area. There are 17 privately owned barns, with more than 450 stalls. Each barn has its own set of turn out paddocks and porta pens. Barns here at Fair Hill were individually named after some of the du Pont thoroughbred champions such as Parlo, Chevation and Fairy Chant.

There are two race tracks: a mile dirt track and a 7/8-mile track with an artificial surface (Tapeta). The campus also includes 3,000 acres (12 km^{2}) of grasslands and woods which can be used by trainers who wish to take their horses out on trails.

== Location ==
Fair Hill is close to many racetracks, including Delaware Park, Laurel Park and Pimlico Race Course (Maryland), Parx Racing and Penn National Race Course (Pennsylvania), Monmouth Park Racetrack and the Meadowlands Racetrack (New Jersey), Aqueduct Racetrack and Belmont Park (New York), and Charles Town Races (West Virginia).

== Major successes ==
Fair Hill's grade one successes include the Kentucky Derby (Barbaro, Animal Kingdom), the Breeders' Cup Turf (Better Talk Now), Breeders' Cup Distaff (Round Pond), the Arlington Million (Kicken Kris), the Barbaro Stakes at Delaware Park (Xchanger, Chelokee), and the Queen Elizabeth II Challenge Cup Stakes (Film Maker).
