= Idun (horse) =

American-bred Thoroughbred racehorse

- Sire: Royal Charger
- Dam: Tige O'Myheart
- Damsire: Bull Lea
- Sex: Mare
- Foaled: 1955
- Country: United States
- Colour: Bay
- Breeder: Leslie Combs II & John W. Hanes
- Owner: Josephine Bay Paul
- Trainer: Sherrill W. Ward
- Rider: Bill Hartack
- Record: 30: 17-4-4
- Earnings: $392,490

Major wins
- Frizette Stakes (1957); Gardenia Trial Stakes (1957); Gardenia Stakes (1957); Matron Stakes (1957); Gazelle Handicap (1958); Mother Goose Stakes (1958); Colonial Handicap (1959); Columbiana Handicap (1959); Liberty Belle Handicap (1959); Maskette Handicap (1959)

Awards
- U.S. Champion 2-year-old filly (1957); U.S. Champion 3-year-old filly (1958)
- Last updated on November 24, 2006

Idun (April 8, 1955-1979) was an American Thoroughbred Champion racehorse who won U.S. Champion 2 and 3-year-old filly honors.

Sired by Royal Charger, a son of the very important sire Nearco, Idun was owned by Josephine Bay, wife of Charles Ulrick Bay, business executive and the United States Ambassador to Norway from 1946 to 1953. The filly was ridden by future Hall of Fame jockey Bill Hartack and trained by another future Hall of Famer, Sherrill W. Ward who would later condition Forego.

== Pedigree ==
Pedigree of Idun, bay mare, 1955
Sire Royal Charger	Nearco	Pharos	Phalaris
Sire Royal Charger	Nearco	Pharos	Scapa Flow
Sire Royal Charger	Nearco	Nogara	Havresac
Sire Royal Charger	Nearco	Nogara	Catnip
Sire Royal Charger	Sun Princess	Solario	Gainsborough
Sire Royal Charger	Sun Princess	Solario	Sun Worship
Sire Royal Charger	Sun Princess	Mumtaz Begum	Blenheim
Sire Royal Charger	Sun Princess	Mumtaz Begum	Mumtaz Mahal
Dam Tige O'myheart	Bull Lea	Bull Dog	Teddy
Dam Tige O'myheart	Bull Lea	Bull Dog	Plucky Liege
Dam Tige O'myheart	Bull Lea	Rose Leaves	Ballot
Dam Tige O'myheart	Bull Lea	Rose Leaves	Colonial
Dam Tige O'myheart	Unerring	Insco	Sir Gallahad
Dam Tige O'myheart	Unerring	Insco	Starflight
Dam Tige O'myheart	Unerring	Margaret Lawrence	Vulcain
Dam Tige O'myheart	Unerring	Margaret Lawrence	Bohemia (family: 4-m)
