= Milkmaid (horse) =

American-bred Thoroughbred racehorse

- Milkmaid, 1919 Kenner Stakes
- Sire: Peep o' Day
- Grandsire: Ayrshire
- Dam: Nell Olin
- Damsire: Wagner
- Sex: Filly
- Foaled: 1916
- Country: United States
- Colour: Bay
- Breeder: J. Hal Woodford
- Owner: John E. Madden; J.K.L. Ross
- Trainer: John E. Madden; H. Guy Bedwell
- Record: Not found
- Earnings: US$41,495

Major wins
- Hopeful Purse (1918); Laurel Oakwood Handicap (1918); Wilmington Purse (1919); Bellair Handicap (1919); Gazelle Handicap (1919); Kenner Stakes (1919); Black-Eyed Susan Stakes (1919); Pimlico Oaks (1919); Ladies Handicap (1920); Salem Handicap (1920); Galway Handicap (1920); Fourth of July Stakes (1920); Great Neck Handicap (1920); Mineola Handicap (1920)

Awards
- American Co-Champion 3-Year-Old Filly (1919); American Champion Older Female Horse (1920)

Milkmaid (foaled 1916 in Kentucky) was an American two-time Champion Thoroughbred racehorse. She was bred by J. Hal Woodford at his farm in Bourbon County, Kentucky. Woodford had bred and raced the 1907 Kentucky Derby winner, Pink Star. Out of the mare, Nell Olin, her sire was the British import, Peep o' Day, a son of the great Ayrshire who won the 1888 2,000 Guineas Stakes and Epsom Derby then just missed winning the British Triple Crown when he ran second in the St. Leger Stakes.

Purchased at age two in 1918 by owner/trainer John E. Madden, after winning the September 18th Hopeful Purse at Havre de Grace Racetrack he sold Milkmaid to Canadian, J.K.L. Ross. Her race conditioning was then turned over to future U.S. Racing Hall of Fame trainer, Guy Bedwell.

== 1919 racing season ==
During an illustrious career in which she was frequently ridden by the great Hall of Fame jockey, Earl Sande, Milkmaid won races at both sprint and longer distances. At age three and four her success against other fillies and mares resulted in her being saddled with high weight for most of her career. On April 21, 1919, Milkmaid won the Wilmington Purse at Havre de Grace Racetrack, defeating a field of colts with Kentucky Derby and Preakness Stakes aspirations in a time that was just one-fifth of a second off the track record. In May, Milkmaid and her Kentucky Derby-winning stablemate Sir Barton were entered in the Preakness Stakes. Milkmaid finished eighth but according to a June 27, 1994 Sports Illustrated article, jockey Earl Sande was "told to veer Milkmaid in at the start, break up the alignment of the field and allow Sir Barton time to get a good position." Sir Barton proved he didn't need Milkmaid's help to win the Preakness and went on to capture that year's U.S. Triple Crown. However, on an equal footing as demonstrated in the Wilmington Purse, Milkmaid had great success against colts including a win in the 1919 Kenner Stakes at Saratoga Race Course in which she beat Sam Hildreth's top colt, Cirrus. Burdened with fourteen more pounds than Harry Payne Whitney's winning filly Vexatious, Milkmaid ran second in the 1919 Alabama Stakes at Saratoga. Milkmaid's 1919 performances resulted in her being voted American Champion Three-Year-Old Filly

== 1920 racing season ==
On August 19, 1920, racing against males, four-year-old Milkmaid set a new Saratoga Race Course track record for seven furlongs. A few weeks later on September 3, she set another track record against males in winning the Great Neck Handicap at a distance of a mile and a sixteenth at Belmont Park. For 1920, Milkmaid earned American Champion Older Female Horse honors.

== As a broodmare ==
Retired to broodmare duty at her owner's Yarrow Brae Stud farm in Maryland, Milkmaid produced two foals from J.K. L. Ross's stallion, Cudgel. Her colt, Lactarius, was born in 1924 and raced for J.K. L. Ross, notably winning the Connaught Cup Stakes. Financial problems resulted in J.K.L. Ross liquidating his racing stable and in August 1926 Milkmaid was sold at a Saratoga auction. Her second foal was born to her new owners in 1927. Named Milkman, the colt had modest success racing but as a sire did produce a number of successful runners.
