= American Champion Three-Year-Old Filly =

Award for American racehorses

The American Champion Three-Year-Old Filly is an American Thoroughbred horse racing honor awarded annually to a female horse in Thoroughbred flat racing. It became part of the Eclipse Awards program in 1971.

The award originated in 1936 when both the Daily Racing Form (DRF) and Turf and Sports Digest (TSD) magazine began naming an annual champion. Starting in 1950, the Thoroughbred Racing Associations (TRA) began naming its own champion. The following list provides the name of the horses chosen by these organizations. There were several disagreements, with more than one champion being recognized on five occasions. In 1949, two Calumet Farm fillies, Wistful and Two Lea, shared the Champion's title after finishing equal top of the Daily Racing Form poll.

The Daily Racing Form, the Thoroughbred Racing Associations, and the National Turf Writers Association all joined forces in 1971 to create the Eclipse Award. In 1978, the voting resulted in a tie between two fillies.

Champions from 1887 through 1935 were selected retrospectively by a panel of experts as published by The Blood-Horse magazine.

== Honorees ==
=== Eclipse Awards ===
Year	Horse	Trainer	Owner
2025	Nitrogen	Mark E. Casse	D J Stable
2024	Thorpedo Anna	Kenneth McPeek	Nader Alaali, Mark Edwards, Judy Hicks, and Magdalena Racing
2023	Pretty Mischievous	Brendan P. Walsh	Godolphin Racing
2022	Nest	Todd A. Pletcher	Repole Stable, Eclipse Thoroughbred Partners & Michael House
2021	Malathaat	Todd A. Pletcher	Shadwell Stable
2020	Swiss Skydiver	Kenneth McPeek	Peter J. Callahan
2019	Covfefe	Brad H. Cox	LNJ Foxwoods
2018	Monomoy Girl	Brad H. Cox	Sol Kumin, Michael Dubb, Elkstone Group & Bethlehem Stables
2017	Abel Tasman	Bob Baffert	China Horse Club International & Clearsky Farms
2016	Songbird	Jerry Hollendorfer	Fox Hill Farms Inc.
2015	Stellar Wind	John W. Sadler	Hronis Racing
2014	Untapable	Steve Asmussen	Ron Winchell
2013	Beholder	Richard E. Mandella	Spendthrift Farm
2012	Questing	Kiaran McLaughlin	Godolphin Racing
2011	Royal Delta	Bill Mott	Saud bin Khaled
2010	Blind Luck	Jerry Hollendorfer	M. Dedomenico, J. Carver, J. Hollendorfer, Abruzz
2009	Rachel Alexandra	Steve Asmussen	Stonestreet Stables
2008	Proud Spell	J. Larry Jones	Brereton C. Jones
2007	Rags to Riches	Todd A. Pletcher	Michael Tabor & Derrick Smith
2006	Wait A While	Todd A. Pletcher	Arindel Farm
2005	Smuggler	Claude R. McGaughey III	Ogden Mills Phipps
2004	Ashado	Todd A. Pletcher	Jonabell Farm
2003	Bird Town	Nick Zito	Marylou Whitney Stables
2002	Farda Amiga	Paulo Lobo	Escolastica Stable et al.
2001	Xtra Heat	John E. Salzman Sr.	J. E. Salzman Sr., Ken Taylor, Harry Deitchman
2000	Surfside	D. Wayne Lukas	Overbrook Farm
1999	Silverbulletday	Bob Baffert	Michael E. Pegram
1998	Banshee Breeze	Carl Nafzger	Jayeff B. Stables & James B. Tafel
1997	Ajina	William I. Mott	Allen E. Paulson
1996	Yanks Music	Leo O'Brien	Audrey H. Cooper & Michael Fennessy
1995	Serena's Song	D. Wayne Lukas	Robert & Beverly Lewis
1994	Heavenly Prize	Claude R. McGaughey III	Ogden Phipps
1993	Hollywood Wildcat	Neil D. Drysdale	Irving & Marjorie Cowan
1992	Saratoga Dew	Gary Sciacca	Charles F. Engel
1991	Dance Smartly	James E. Day	Sam-Son Farm
1990	Go For Wand	William Badgett Jr.	Christiana Stable
1989	Open Mind	D. Wayne Lukas	Eugene V. Klein
1988	Winning Colors	D. Wayne Lukas	Eugene V. Klein
1987	Sacahuista	D. Wayne Lukas	Barry A. Beal & Lloyd R. French Jr.
1986	Tiffany Lass	Laz Barrera	Aaron U. Jones
1985	Mom's Command	Edward T. Allard	Peter D. Fuller
1984	Life's Magic	D. Wayne Lukas	Eugene V. Klein & Mel Hatley
1983	Heartlight No. One	Pedro Marti	Burt Bacharach
1982	Christmas Past	Angel Penna Jr.	Cynthia Phipps
1981	Wayward Lass	Jose A. Martin	Lizza & Hochreiter
1980	Genuine Risk	LeRoy Jolley	Diana M. Firestone
1979	Davona Dale	John M. Veitch	Calumet Farm
1978	Tempest Queen	Lou Rondinello	John W. Galbreath
1977	Our Mims	John M. Veitch	Calumet Farm
1976	Revidere	David A. Whiteley	William Haggin Perry
1975	Ruffian	Frank Y. Whiteley Jr.	Stuart & Barbara Janney
1974	Chris Evert	Joseph A. Trovato	Carl Rosen
1973	Desert Vixen	Thomas F. Root Sr.	Harry T. Mangurian Jr.
1972	Susan's Girl	John W. Russell	Fred W. Hooper
1971	Turkish Trousers	Charles E. Whittingham	Howard B. Keck

=== Daily Racing Form, Turf & Sport Digest and Thoroughbred Racing Association Awards ===
Year	Horse	Trainer	Owner
1970	Office Queen (DRF)	Budd Lepman	Stephen A. Calder
1970	Fanfreluche (TRA)	Yonnie Starr	J. Louis Lévesque
1969	Gallant Bloom	William J. Hirsch	Robert J. Kelberg Jr.
1968	Dark Mirage	Everett W. King	Lloyd I. Miller
1967	Furl Sail (DRF)	John L. Winans	Edwin K. Thomas
1967	Gamely (TRA)	James W. Maloney	William Haggin Perry
1966	Lady Pitt	Stephen A. DiMauro	Thomas A. Eazor
1965	What a Treat	Sylvester Veitch	George D. Widener Jr.
1964	Tosmah	Joseph W. Mergler	Briardale Farm
1963	Lamb Chop	James W. Maloney	William Haggin Perry
1962	Cicada	Casey Hayes	Meadow Stable
1961	Bowl of Flowers	J. Elliott Burch	Brookmeade Stable
1960	Berlo	Richard E. Handlen	William du Pont Jr.
1959	Royal Native (DRF)	Kenny Noe Sr.	Perne L. Grissom
1959	Silver Spoon (TRA)	Robert L. Wheeler	Cornelius Vanderbilt Whitney
1958	Idun	Sherrill W. Ward	Mrs. Charles U. Bay
1957	Bayou	Moody Jolley	Claiborne Farm
1956	Doubledogdare	Moody Jolley	Claiborne Farm
1955	Misty Morn	Sunny Jim Fitzsimmons	Wheatley Stable
1954	Parlo	Richard E. Handlen	William du Pont Jr.
1953	Grecian Queen	James P. Conway	Florence Whitaker
1952	Real Delight	Ben A. Jones	Calumet Farm
1951	Kiss Me Kate	Oscar White	Walter M. Jeffords
1950	Next Move	William C. Winfrey	Alfred G. Vanderbilt II

=== Daily Racing Form and Turf & Sport Digest Awards ===
Year	Horse	Trainer	Owner
1949	Two Lea (DRF tie)	Horace A. Jones	Calumet Farm
1949	Wistful (DRF tie)	Horace A. Jones	Calumet Farm
1948	Miss Request	James P. Conway	Florence Whitaker
1947	But Why Not	Max Hirsch	Robert J. Kleberg Jr.
1946	Bridal Flower	James W. Smith	John R. Bradley
1945	Busher	George M. Odom	Louis B. Mayer
1944	Twilight Tear	Ben A. Jones	Calumet Farm
1943	Stefanita	Bert Mulholland	George D. Widener Jr.
1942	Vagrancy	James E. Fitzsimmons	Belair Stud
1941	Painted Veil	Graceton Philpot	Louis B. Mayer
1940	Fairy Chant	Richard E. Handlen	William du Pont Jr.
1939	Unerring (DRF)	Ben A. Jones	Woolford Farm
1939	War Plumage	Howard Oots	James Cox Brady Jr.
1938	Handcuff	Hugh L. Fontaine	Isabel Dodge Sloane
1937	Dawn Play	Max Hirsch	Robert J. Kleberg Jr.
1936	High Fleet	Bert Mulholland	George D. Widener Jr.

=== The Blood-Horse retrospective champions ===
Year	Horse	Trainer	Owner
1935	Black Helen	William A. Hurley	Edward R. Bradley
1934	Mata Hari	Clyde Van Dusen	Charles T. Fisher
1934	Bazaar	Herbert J. Thompson	Edward R. Bradley
1933	Barn Swallow	Herbert J. Thompson	Edward R. Bradley
1932	Top Flight	Thomas J. Healey	C. V. Whitney
1931	Tambour	Preston M. Burch	Preston M. Burch
1930	Alcibiades	Walter W. Taylor	Hal Price Headley
1930	Snowflake	Jack R. Pryce	Walter J. Salmon Sr.
1929	Rose of Sharon	Daniel E. Stewart	Johnson N. Camden Jr.
1928	Bateau	Scott P. Harlan	Walter M. Jeffords
1928	Easter Stockings	Kay Spence	Audley Farm Stable
1927	Nimba	George M. Odom	Marshall Field III
1926	Edith Cavell	Scott P. Harlan	Walter M. Jeffords
1926	Black Maria	William H. Karrick	William R. Coe
1925	Florence Nightingale	Robert A. Smith	Walter M. Jeffords
1925	Maid at Arms	Gwyn R. Tompkins	Samuel D. Riddle
1924	Nellie Morse	Albert B. Gordon	Bud Fisher
1924	Princess Doreen	Kay Spence	Audley Farm Stable
1923	Untidy	Scott P. Harlan	Helen Hay Whitney
1922	Emotion	George M. Odom	Robert L. Gerry Sr.
1921	Prudery	James G. Rowe Sr.	Harry Payne Whitney
1920	Cleopatra	William H. Karrick	William R. Coe
1919	Milkmaid	H. Guy Bedwell	J. K. L. Ross
1919	Vexatious	James G. Rowe Sr.	Harry Payne Whitney
1918	Enfilade	John Hastings	Morton L. Schwartz
1918	Eyelid	Richard O. Miller	Anthony L. Aste
1917	Sunbonnet	Walter B. Jennings	A. Kingsley Macomber
1916	Kathleen	Pete Coyne	George J. Long
1915	Regret	James G. Rowe Sr.	Harry Payne Whitney
1914	Addie M.	George W. Langdon	John W. Messervy
1913	Flying Fairy	J. Simon Healy	Edward B. Cassatt
1912	None Selected	n/a	n/a
1911	None Selected	n/a	n/a
1910	Ocean Bound	French Brooks	Woodford Clay
1909	Maskette	James G. Rowe Sr.	James R. Keene
1908	Stamina	A. Jack Joyner	Harry Payne Whitney
1907	Court Dress	James G. Rowe Sr.	James R. Keene
1907	Kennyetto	William Hayward Jr.	John Sanford
1906	Tangle	John E. Madden	Francis R. Hitchcock
1906	Running Water	Thomas Welsh	Newcastle Stable
1905	Artful	John W. Rogers	Harry Payne Whitney
1905	Tanya	John W. Rogers	Harry Payne Whitney
1904	Beldame	Fred Burlew	Newton Bennington
1903	Eugenia Burch	William C. Smith	Libby Curtis
1902	Blue Girl	John W. Rogers	William C. Whitney
1901	Trigger	Charles F. Hill	Clarence H. Mackay
1900	Killashandra	Sam Hildreth	William C. Whitney
1899	Admiration	Sam Hildreth	William C. Whitney
1898	Briar Sweet	Walter B. Jennings	Walter B. Jennings
1897	Cleophus	Hardy Campbell Jr.	Michael F. Dwyer
1896	Souffle	James M. Murphy	James M. Murphy
1895	The Butterflies	John J. Hyland	David Gideon
1894	Beldemere	Edward Feakes	Preakness Stables
1893	None Selected	n/a	n/a
1892	Yo Tambien	John Huffman	Kendall Stable
1892	Yorkville Belle	Matthew M. Allen	Frank A. Ehret
1891	La Tosca	John Huggins	Pierre Lorillard IV
1890	Sinaloa II	Robert E. Campbell	E. J. "Lucky" Baldwin
1889	Fides	James G. Rowe Sr.	August Belmont
1888	Los Angeles	Robert E. Campbell	E. J. "Lucky" Baldwin
1888	Bella B.	Frank McCabe	Dwyer Brothers Stable
1887	Firenze	Matthew Byrnes	James B. A. Haggin
