= But Why Not =

American-bred Thoroughbred racehorse

- Sire: Blue Larkspur
- Grandsire: Black Servant
- Dam: Be Like Mom
- Damsire: Sickle
- Sex: Mare
- Foaled: 1944
- Country: United States
- Colour: Bay
- Breeder: King Ranch
- Owner: King Ranch
- Trainer: Max Hirsch; Buddy Hirsch (West Coast)
- Record: 46: 12-7-5
- Earnings: $213,060

Major wins
- Alabama Stakes (1947); Black-Eyed Susan Stakes (1947); Pimlico Oaks (1947); Acorn Stakes (1947); Beldame Stakes (1948); Arlington Classic (1948); Arlington Matron Handicap (1948); Top Flight Handicap (1949); Personal Ensign Handicap (1949); Washington's Birthday Handicap (1950)

Awards
- American Champion Three-Year-Old Filly (1947)

But Why Not (foaled in 1944) was an American Thoroughbred racehorse. The daughter of Blue Larkspur and granddaughter of Black Servant is probably best remembered for wins in the Alabama Stakes, the Acorn Stakes, and the Black-Eyed Susan Stakes at Pimlico Race Course. In 1947, she was voted by the country's top sports writers as the American Champion Three-Year-Old Filly.

== Three-year-old season ==
But Why Not did not run as a two-year-old. In 1947, she ran in eleven races over ten months and won most of them. After breaking her maiden and winning an allowance race, she ran in the Empire City Stakes in early April at the old Jamaica Race Course in New York, where she placed second to Phalanx at 9.5 furlongs. She rested for six weeks and then competed in the $25,000 Black-Eyed Susan Stakes (then called the Pimlico Oaks) on May 16, 1947. The race was held at Pimlico Race Course in Baltimore, Maryland, and was run over a distance of one mile and a sixteenth on a fast dirt track. In that race, But Why Not beat stakes winners Cosmic Missile and Oberod in a time of 1:46.40 under jockey Warren Mehrtens.

Later that year, But Why Not reeled off five victories in seven stakes races. In the beginning of June, she won the Acorn Stakes at Belmont Park. Then she shipped to Chicago, Illinois, in late June and won the Arlington Classic at a mile in open company on the turf. She added another win that year at Arlington Park in the Arlington Matron Handicap at a mile on the dirt. In August, But Why Not traveled to upstate New York and ran in the prestigious Alabama Stakes at Saratoga Race Course. In that race, she beat Miss Grillo going away in 2:05 flat over a mile and a quarter on the dirt. She also finished second in the Dwyer Stakes against males, losing again to Phalanx, and second in the Ladies Handicap to Snow Goose at Belmont Park

== Four- and five-year-old seasons ==
Early in 1949 at Jamaica Race Course, But Why Not raced against fillies and placed second behind Lithe in the Comely Stakes. Then her owners at King Ranch entered her in the Metropolitan Handicap at Belmont Park over the Memorial Day weekend. But Why Not finished third to Loser Weeper and Vulcan's Forge. She again took on males on the Belmont Stakes undercard in the one and a quarter mile Suburban Handicap and finished second to Vulcan's Forge. In late August, she went back to racing against her own gender and won the Firenze Handicap (now called the Personal Ensign Handicap) at a mile and one sixteenth at Saratoga Race Course, beating Allies Pal and Conniver in 1:44-4/5. In November, she competed at one mile in the Top Flight Handicap at Belmont Park, where she won going away under jockey Dave Gorman in 1:43.60. Due to an injury, But Why Not did not race again for over 14 months.

== Six-year-old season ==
At age six, But Why Not attempted a comeback after her injury. She raced in early March 1950 in the Santa Margarita Handicap at Santa Anita Park and ran third to Champion Two Lea and Gaffery. Then she won the inaugural running of Washington Birthday Handicap at Santa Anita Park (which is now called the San Luis Obispo Handicap over Bolero with jockey William Boland in the irons. That was the last race of her career, and then she retired.
