= Susan's Girl =

American-bred Thoroughbred racehorse

- Sire: Quadrangle
- Grandsire: Cohoes
- Dam: Quaze
- Damsire: Quibu
- Sex: Filly
- Foaled: 1969
- Country: United States
- Color: Bay
- Breeder: Fred Hooper Jr.
- Owner: Fred W. Hooper
- Trainer: John W. Russell (at 3); Chuck Parke (at 4); J. L. Newman (a 6); L. Ross Fenstermaker (at 6)
- Record: 63: 29-14-11
- Earnings: $1,251,668

Major wins
- Signature Stakes (1971?); Villager Stakes (1971?); Pasadena Stakes (1972); Acorn Stakes (1972); Cotillion Handicap (1972); Santa Susana Stakes (1972); Santa Ynez Stakes (1972); La Troienne Stakes (1972); Kentucky Oaks (1972); Beldame Stakes (1972, 1975); Gazelle Stakes (1972); Santa Margarita Invitational Handicap (1973); Santa Maria Handicap (1973); Santa Barbara Handicap (1973); Susquehanna Handicap (1973); Spinster Stakes (1973, 1975); Delaware Handicap (1973, 1975); Falls City Handicap (1974); Matchmaker Stakes (1975); Apple Blossom Handicap (1975); Long Beach Handicap (1975); Gamely Stakes (1975)

Awards
- American Champion Three-Year-Old Filly (1972); American Champion Older Female Horse (1973 & 1975)

Honors
- U.S. Racing Hall of Fame (1976) #51 - Top 100 U.S. Racehorses of the 20th Century; Susan's Girl Stakes at Delaware Park; Susan's Girl Stakes at Gulfstream Park

Susan's Girl (1969–October 18, 1988) was an American Thoroughbred racehorse, bred and owned by Fred W. Hooper. She was the first American filly to earn over $1,000,000.

== Racing career ==
Racing as a two-year-old in 1971, Susan's Girl came up against a top filly called Numbered Account. Susan's Girl won her first races as a three-year-old, winning nine of her first thirteen starts and never finishing out of the money. That year she was the American Champion Three-Year-Old Filly.

At four, racing on both coasts, Susan's Girl won over $500,000.

By the end of the racing season in 1973, the filly was second only to Shuvee in career earnings. In February 1974, however, she chipped a bone in her left foreleg. Hooper sent her to the equine surgeon Dr. Robert Copelan, who removed three chips and sent her home to Hooper's farm in Ocala, Florida. For two months, Susan's Girl swam in the nearby Lake Weir every day. After nine months, she recovered and returned to racing.

At the age of five, Susan's Girl made a comeback. During her recovery, two European females had passed the million dollar mark: Dahlia and Allez France. In November 1974, Susan's Girl won the Falls City Handicap. In 1975, at the age of six, she had her best season in terms of earnings, winning six stakes and placed in eight. In the Matchmaker Stakes in Atlantic City, New Jersey, she set a track record, beating males as well as older females and passing a million dollars in earning, the first American filly to do so.

Of her 29 wins, 24 came in stakes races. Susan's Girl was the only filly in the 20th century to win a three-year-old championship and then two older female championships.

== Stud record ==
As a broodmare, Susan's Girl produced a Grade I winner, Copelan, named after her surgeon. She died on Hooper's farm on October 18, 1988.
