= Parlo =

American Thoroughbred racehorse

- Sire: Heliopolis
- Grandsire: Hyperion
- Dam: Fairy Palace
- Damsire: Pilate
- Sex: Filly
- Foaled: 1951
- Country: United States
- Colour: Chestnut
- Breeder: William duPont, Jr.
- Owner: Foxcatcher Farm
- Trainer: Richard E. Handlen
- Record: 34: 8-6-3
- Earnings: US$309,240

Major wins
- Beldame Handicap (1954); Delaware Oaks (1954); Firenze Handicap (1954); Alabama Stakes (1954); Delaware Handicap (1955); Top Flight Handicap (1955); Bellerose Handicap (1956)

Awards
- American Champion Three-Year-Old Filly (1954); DRF American Champion Female Handicap Horse (1954); TRA American Champion Older Female Horse (1955)
- Last updated on April 22, 2010

Parlo (April 12, 1951 – 1978) was an American Thoroughbred Champion racehorse.

== Background ==
Bred by William du Pont, Jr. at his Walnut Hall Farm near Boyce, Virginia, she was out of the mare Fairy Palace and sired by the good British runner Heliopolis whom Parlo helped earn his second Leading sire in North America title in 1954. Parlo was trained by Richard Handlen.

== Racing career ==
At age two Parlo's best major race result was a second in the 1953 Demoiselle Stakes.

In 1954 Parlo had major wins that included the Delaware Oaks at Delaware Park Racetrack, the Alabama Stakes at Saratoga Race Course, the Beldame Handicap at Aqueduct Racetrack in stakes record time, and the Firenze Handicap at Jamaica Race Course by seven lengths. At the end of the year she was voted 1954 American Champion Three-Year-Old Filly and took the Daily Racing Form award for Champion Female Handicap Horse.

In June 1955 Parlo won the Top Flight Handicap, setting a new Belmont Park track record time. Then, in July she won the Delaware Handicap in track record time. She earned her second straight American Champion Older Female Horse title from the Thoroughbred Racing Association. The rival Daily Racing Form award for Champion Female Handicap Horse went to the three-year-old Misty Morn.

Winless for over a year, in July 1956 Partlo won the Bellerose Handicap at Jamaica Race Course.

== Stud record ==
Bred to outstanding horses such as Ribot, Sea Bird, Native Dancer, and Graustark, among others, Parlo produced eleven foals between 1958 and 1975. While her offspring that raced met with limited success, her daughter, All Beautiful, by Battlefield was the 1969 American Broodmare of the Year as the dam of the U.S. Racing Hall of Fame colt, Arts and Letters.
