= William du Pont Jr. =

American banker and racehorse breeder (1896–1965)

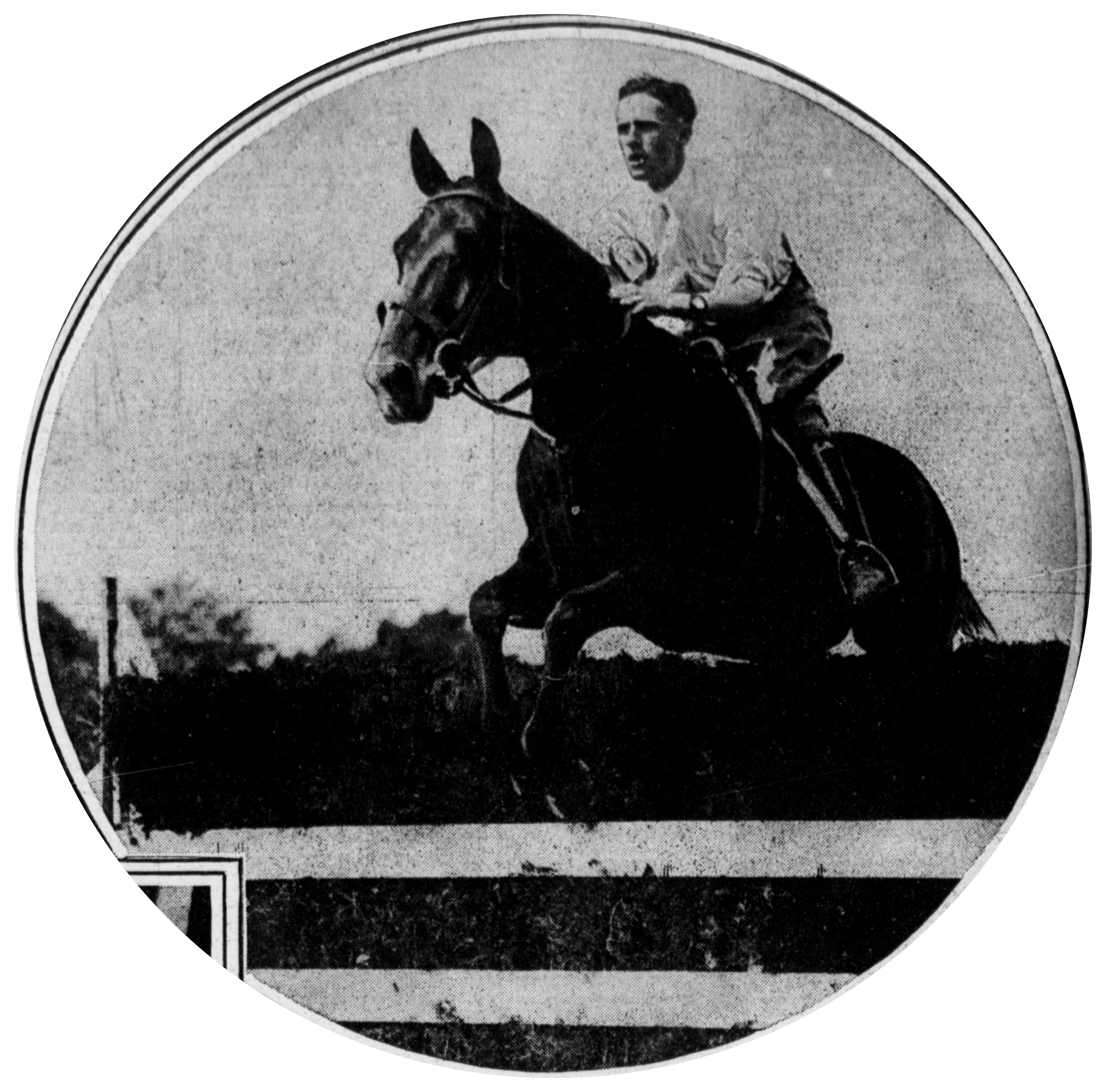
- du Pont riding at a 1915 horse show
- Born: February 11, 1896; Loseley Park, Surrey, England, U.K.
- Died: December 31, 1965 (aged 69); Wilmington, Delaware, U.S.
- Resting place: Du Pont de Nemours Cemetery
- Occupations: Businessman, banker, racetrack owner, racehorse owner/breeder, racecourse designer
- Board member of: Delaware Trust Company
- Spouses: Jean Liseter Austin (m. 1919; div. 1941) Margaret Osborne (m. 1947; div. 1964)
- Children: with Jean: John Eleuthère; Evelyn; Jean Ellen; Henry E. I.; with Margaret: William du Pont III
- Parent(s): William du Pont & Annie Rogers
- Relatives: Marion duPont Scott (sister)
- Awards: Delaware Sports Hall of Fame (1979)

William du Pont Jr. (February 11, 1896 – December 31, 1965) was an English-born American businessman and banker, and a prominent figure in the sport of Thoroughbred horse racing. He developed and designed more than 20 racing venues, including Fair Hill at his 5,000-acre estate in Maryland. A member of the Delaware Du Pont family, he was the son of William du Pont and Annie Rogers Zinn, and brother to Marion duPont Scott, a noted horsewoman and breeder.

== Early life and education ==
William (also called Willie) was born at Loseley Park, a 16th-century manor in Surrey, England. He was the second child and only son of Annie Zinn (née Rogers) and William du Pont. His older sister was Marion, and they grew up at Montpelier, the historic home of President James Madison, which their parents had bought and expanded.

They both were educated in private schools and became interested in the world of thoroughbred horse racing, including steeplechase, hunts, and horse shows. William specialized in thoroughbred racing and breeding. Marion also became known for her contributions to horse racing and breeding.

== Marriages, family, and career ==
On January 1, 1919, du Pont married Jean Liseter Austin. Their marriage celebration in Rosemont, Pennsylvania, was billed as the "Wedding of the Century" in media accounts because of the wealth of each family. Jean's father, William Liseter Austin, was a railroad baron at the Baldwin Locomotive Works. He gave the couple more than 600 acres (2.4 km^{2}) of land as a wedding gift. William's father built Liseter Hall for them on the property in 1922. The three-story Georgian mansion was a replica of Montpelier, where du Pont had grown up.

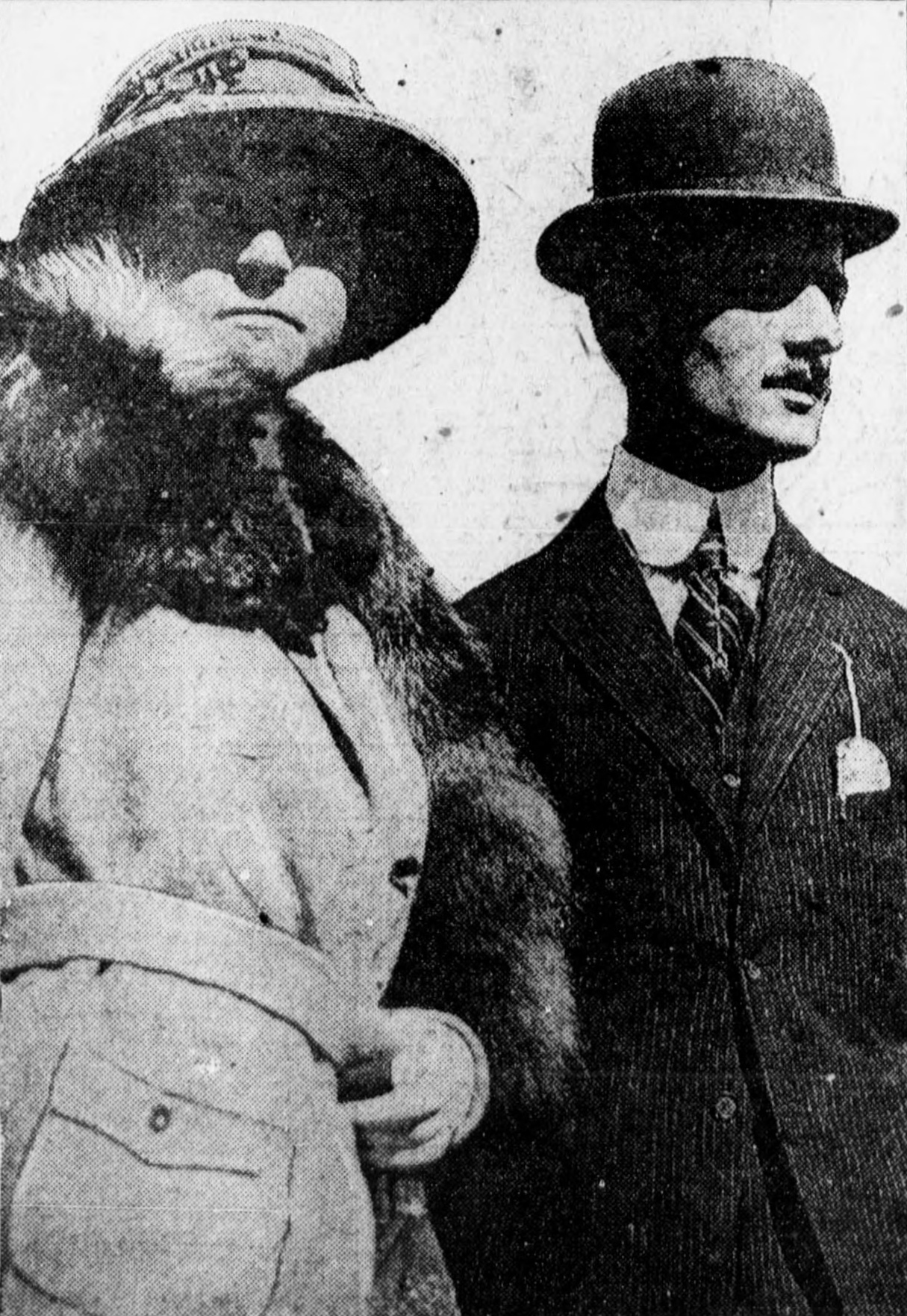
du Pont with his wife Jean Liseter, 1919

Du Pont was elected to the board of directors of the Delaware Trust Company, where his father was president (and later chairman of the board), in 1921. His career with the bank would continue until his death. In 1928, William inherited the Bellevue Hall estate in Delaware upon the death of his father. The estate featured a Gothic Revival castle built in 1855, which du Pont had remodeled into another replica of his boyhood home of Montpelier. His father's death also created a vacancy in the presidency of the Delaware Trust Company, and William ascended to the position.

Du Pont and his wife developed a notable horse farm on their property. In the 1920s and 1930s, Liseter Hall Farm was considered the ne plus ultra of Mid-Atlantic horse facilities. In addition to the indoor galloping track, the first in the United States, the farm featured a large barn for race horses; a 40-foot (12 m)-wide by 120-foot (37 m)-long indoor riding ring, used by trainers for schooling young horses; the half-mile training track and its adjacent combination viewing stand/water tower; a breeding shed; a hunter barn; a show horse barn; a loading barn with ramps, for transporting horses to competition; and a grassy, half-mile chute that connected the training track with the race horse, hunter and show horse barns. Similar facilities were built at the Bellevue Hall estate, including a hunting barn, two indoor training tracks, and an outdoor track.

Du Pont and Jean had four children together, two girls and two boys. They divorced in February 1941, when the youngest, John, was 2 years old. Jean Liseter du Pont retained the property her father gave her. Following the divorce, du Pont moved his permanent residence to Bellevue Hall.

Du Pont remarried in 1947 to Margaret Osborne, a tennis champion. He built both an indoor and outdoor tennis court at Bellevue for the benefit of his wife. They had a son, William du Pont III, born July 22, 1952. That same year, du Pont was made chairman of the board at the Delaware Trust Company, retaining his position as president as well. Osborne and du Pont divorced in 1964. Their son William du Pont III also was active with thoroughbreds and later owned Pillar Stud in Lexington, Kentucky.

== Foxcatcher Farm ==
At Liseter Hall Farm, du Pont Jr. established a large thoroughbred racing stable in the 1920s; he raced its horses under the nom de course, Foxcatcher Farm. During this period, he also established breeding operations at Bellevue Hall, his family's estate in Wilmington, Delaware. He had another operation at Fair Hill, where he established a steeplechase course on his 1,000 acres (4.0 km^{2}) facility.

In 1927, du Pont imported Satrap from England and brought the son of The Tetrarch to stand at his second facility, the new Walnut Hall Farm near Boyce, Virginia. In 1936, duPont was part of the syndicate that bought and imported the stallion Blenheim, Aga Khan's Epsom Derby winner.

Du Pont's racing operation was managed for several years by the trainer Preston Burch, selected for the U.S. Racing Hall of Fame.

In the mid-1930s, Richard Handlen took over as the trainer, managing the stable operation into the 1960s. During this time, du Pont won the 1938 Preakness Stakes with Dauber, the second race of the Triple Crown for three-year-olds. Other of his horses won six American championships and prominent races:

- Fair Star – 1926 American Champion Two-Year-Old Filly
- White Clover II – 1932 Suburban Handicap
- Rosemont (horse) took the 1935 Withers Stakes, beating that season's Triple Crown winner, Omaha; he also beat Seabiscuit in the 1937 Santa Anita Handicap, a match race
- Ruler, duPont's first homebred stakes winner, won the Brook Steeplechase in 1929 and 1930.
- Fairy Chant – 1940 American Champion Three-Year-Old Filly and 1941 American Champion Older Female Horse
- Parlo – 1954 American Champion Three-Year-Old Filly and the 1954 and 1955 American Champion Older Female Horse.
- Berlo – 1960 American Champion Three-Year-Old Filly.

Their successes contributed to the value and reputation of his stables.

Du Pont's interests in racing extended to the development and design of racecourses. In all, he created 23 racecourses, including Fair Hill, a steeplechase course at Fair Hill in Cecil County, Maryland, and Delaware Park Racetrack for flat racing. The latter opened on June 26, 1937. He had also helped write the legislation to authorize development of the park and was the major shareholder. The Thoroughbred farms and racing were important parts of the Delaware and Maryland economies in those decades, although racing gradually drew smaller crowds.

He died at the Wilmington Medical Center at age 69 on December 31, 1965.

== Montpelier ==
In 1928, Marion duPont Scott, the older child, inherited Montpelier after their father's death. Located four miles (6 km) south of Orange, Virginia, the estate had been the plantation home of James Madison, fourth President of the United States. In 1934, William and Marion established the Montpelier Races, a National Steeplechase event, which continues to be run each fall on the grounds at Montpelier.

At her death in 1983 Scott left the estate, designated a National Historic Landmark, to the National Trust for Historic Preservation. Her father's will had said that if she were childless, the property would be inherited by her brother and his children. Her will included a provision for his children to sell or give their interests in the property to the National Trust or forfeit their share of a separate $3.1 million trust. In addition, she provided $10 million to the National Trust to buy the property and to establish an endowment. As her brother had died in 1965, his five children inherited Montpelier. Three sold or gave their interests to the National Trust. Although two nephews sued the National Trust in an effort to break the will, they finally sold their interests in 1984.

The National Trust acquired the property to preserve and interpret as a public history site for James and Dolley Madison, his presidency, and the architecture and society of Montpelier. Following a widely publicized scandal in which the Trust fired all of its staff members who had been working towards increased representation of Americans descended from many James Madison's numerous slaves of African heritage on the estate's board of directors, the trust reached an agreement with the descendants group granting the group a majority of board seats, and has since that time been making efforts to reemphasize the history taught at the former plantation around the important historical context of James Madison's participation in slavery in the United States.

== Legacy and honors ==
Following du Pont's death, none of his heirs were interested in retaining the Bellevue Hall estate due to its extensive collection of recreational facilities and the upkeep they required. In 1976, the property was purchased by the state of Delaware and opened to the public as Bellevue State Park. In 1979, du Pont was honored posthumously with induction in the Delaware Sports Museum and Hall of Fame.
