= Gamely =

American-bred Thoroughbred racehorse

- Sire: Bold Ruler
- Grandsire: Nasrullah
- Dam: Gambetta
- Damsire: My Babu
- Sex: Filly
- Foaled: 1964
- Country: United States
- Colour: Bay
- Breeder: Claiborne Farm
- Owner: William Haggin Perry
- Trainer: James W. Maloney
- Record: 41: 16-9-6
- Earnings: $574,961

Major wins
- Princess Stakes (1967); Test Stakes (Division 1, 1967); Alabama Stakes (1967); Vanity Handicap (1968); Santa Margarita Handicap (1968); Santa Maria Handicap (1968); Beldame Stakes (1968 & 1969); Inglewood Handicap (1968); Wilshire Handicap (1968, 1969); Santa Monica Handicap (1969); Diana Handicap (1969)

Awards
- TRA American Champion Three-Year-Old Filly (1967); American Champion Older Female Horse (1968); TRA American Champion Older Female Horse (1969)

Honours
- Aiken Thoroughbred Racing Hall of Fame (1979); U.S. Racing Hall of Fame (1980) #87 - Top 100 U.S. Racehorses of the 20th Century; Gamely Stakes at Hollywood Park Racetrack
- Last updated on January 11, 2008

Gamely (February 10, 1964 – 1975) was an American Thoroughbred race horse who was voted the champion filly of her age group on three occasions.

== Background ==
Gamely was bred and born at Claiborne Farm outside Paris, Kentucky. Her dam was the stakes-winning mare Gambetta, and her sire was the great sire Bold Ruler. Gambetta's dam, Rough Shod II, also produced the top filly Moccasin, the stakes-winning colt Ridan, and Lt. Stevens, also a major stakes winner. Her owner was William Haggin Perry, whose feeling for Gamely, the filly with the Roman nose, was reflected in the name of his breeding operation: The Gamely Corporation.

== Racing career ==
Gamely was trained by Hall of Fame trainer James Maloney. The filly stood over 16.2 hands high, and Maloney felt she was too big to race as a two-year-old. Like the great Longfellow and the enormous Roseben many years before her, her legs got in her way when she was a youngster. Therefore, Gamely's career began in her third year. She started in California, winning the Princess Stakes and coming in second in the California Oaks and the Railbird Stakes. Then she was sent east to Saratoga, New York, where she won the Test Stakes and the Alabama Stakes. In the Test, she set a seven-furlong track record. She was named American Champion Three-Year-Old Filly by the Thoroughbred Racing Association. Furl Sail won the rival Daily Racing Form award.

Gamely beat males (she was also second to Dr. Fager in the 1968 Californian Stakes), carried heavy weights, and ran for three seasons in 41 races. When she retired in her fifth year, her winnings were the highest among her sire, Bold Ruler's, offspring (later surpassed by Secretariat).

== Breeding record ==
Bred to Round Table twice and twice producing a foal, Gamely died of a ruptured stomach five days after her second foal. She is buried at Claiborne Farm.
