= Ben F. Whitaker =

Ben Whitaker
- Born: August 24, 1892; Oak Cliff, Dallas, Texas, United States
- Died: April 20, 1954 (aged 61); Dallas, Texas, United States
- Resting place: Hillcrest Mausoleum & Memorial Park
- Occupations: Oilman, hotel owner, racehorse owner & breeder
- Spouse: Florence (Davis) Whitaker (1895-1965)
- Parent(s): Oram W. & Nellie Joyce Whitaker

Ben Franklin Whitaker (August 24, 1892 – April 20, 1954) was a Dallas, Texas oilman with producing properties throughout the state of Texas, an owner of the Hotel Whitmore in Dallas, and a major owner and breeder of Thoroughbred racehorses including two National Champions.

Ben Whitaker served with the United States Navy in World War I.

Ben Whitaker began racing horses under his wife's name in the 1930s with stables based at Garland, Texas. His horses competed at the Arlington Downs racetrack located between Fort Worth and Dallas but after racing was banned in the state of Texas he relocated his operations to Lexington, Kentucky.

During his time in racing, Ben Whitaker employed trainers Jack Howard, "Blackie" McCoole, and future Hall of Fame inductee Jimmy Conway who was in charge from 1946 until Whitaker's death in 1954. The owner of horses that won 231 races, among Whitaker's top runners were:

- Requested - purchased for $1300 - at two he won seven stakes races. Sire of Champion, Miss Request.
- My Request - won 16 stakes races at age two through five including the Wood Memorial
- Miss Request - American Champion Three-Year-Old Filly (1948)
- Grecian Queen - American Champion Three-Year-Old Filly (1953)

In April 1954, sixty-year-old Ben Whitaker suffered a heart attack and died a week later in a Dallas hospital.
