= Fairy Chant =

American Thoroughbred racehorse

- Sire: Chance Shot
- Grandsire: Fair Play
- Dam: Star Fairy
- Damsire: The Satrap
- Sex: Filly
- Foaled: 1937
- Country: United States
- Colour: Chestnut
- Breeder: William duPont, Jr.
- Owner: Foxcatcher Farm
- Trainer: Richard E. Handlen
- Record: 42: 10-8-8
- Earnings: US$100,0000

Major wins
- Black-Eyed Susan Stakes (1940); Everglades Stakes (1940); Gazelle Stakes (1940); Beldame Stakes (1940, 1941); Pimlico Oaks (1940); Santa Margarita Handicap (1940)

Awards
- American Champion Three-Year-Old Filly (1940); American Champion Older Female Horse (1941)

Fairy Chant (foaled 1937 in Kentucky) was an American Champion Thoroughbred racehorse. Her sire was the 1927 Belmont Stakes winner Chance Shot, a son of three-time Leading sire in North America Fair Play. Her dam was Star Fairy, a daughter of The Satrap, the 1926 English Champion Three-Year-Old Male Horse who was a son of the great The Tetrarch.

== Racing career ==
Fairy Chant was bred by William du Pont, Jr., and raced under the banner of his Foxcatcher Farm for trainer Richard E. Handlen. She may be best remembered from her win in the $20,000 Black-Eyed Susan Stakes (then called the Pimlico Oaks) on Friday, May 10, 1940. In that race, she took on a field of nine fillies and beat two stakes winners in True Call and Discerning. She won in a final time of 1:49-4/5 for the mile and a sixteenth over dirt with jockey Ralph Neves in the irons. Her performances on the track earned her Champion honors in 1940 and 1941. She finished in the money 62% of the time, earning a win, place or show check in 26 of 42 career races.

As a broodmare, she is best known for producing Chevation.
