= James W. Maloney =

American horse trainer

Personal information
- Born: April 1, 1909 United States
- Died: March 10, 1984 (aged 74)
- Occupation: Trainer

Horse racing career
- Sport: Horse racing

Major racing wins
- Spinaway Stakes (1956); Metropolitan Handicap (1957); Suburban Handicap (1957); Bed O' Roses Handicap (1958, 1981, 1983); Beldame Stakes (1958, 1968, 1969); Vagrancy Handicap (1958, 1983); Breeders' Futurity Stakes (1963); Coaching Club American Oaks (1963); Gazelle Stakes (1963, 1964, 1981, 1982); Personal Ensign Stakes (1963); Santa Anita Oaks (1963, 1965); Saratoga Special Stakes (1963); Spinster Stakes (1963); New York Handicap (1964, 1965); Santa Margarita Invitational Handicap (1964, 1968, 1969); Santa Ynez Stakes (1964, 1965); San Felipe Handicap (1965, 1968); Santa Barbara Handicap (1965, 1968); Santa Maria Handicap (1965, 1968); Santa Monica Handicap (1965, 1966, 1969); Charles H. Strub Stakes (1965, 1969); Santa Anita Derby (1966, 1968); Hollywood Lassie Stakes (1967); Test Stakes (1967); Vanity Handicap (1967, 1968, 1969); Wilshire Handicap (1967, 1968, 1969); Sequoia Handicap (1968); Hollypark Ladies Handicap (1968); Hollywood Gold Cup (1968); Inglewood Handicap (1968); Milady Handicap (1968, 1969); San Vicente Stakes (1968); Diana Stakes (1969); Monrovia Handicap (1969); Brooklyn Handicap (1970); San Antonio Handicap (1970); Travers Stakes (1970); Westchester Handicap (1970); Discovery Handicap (1972); Excelsior Handicap (1972); Governor Stakes (1972); Jamaica Handicap (1976); Jerome Stakes (1976); Saranac Stakes (1976); Cabrillo Handicap (1977); Marlboro Cup Invitational Handicap (1977); Busher Stakes (1978, 1979); Shuvee Handicap (1981); Top Flight Handicap (1981); Alabama Stakes (1982); Go For Wand Handicap (1982); Dwyer Stakes (1983)

Honours
- National Museum of Racing and Hall of Fame (1983)

Significant horses
- Alanesian, Batteur, Boldnesian, Dance Spell, Gamely, Lamb Chop, Princessnesian, Proud Birdie, Traffic Judge

James W. Maloney (April 1, 1909 – March 10, 1984) was an American Hall of Fame trainer of Thoroughbred racehorses. The son of a trainer, his own professional career lasted fifty years from 1935 until his death in 1984.

Jim Maloney trained for such prominent owners as Charles W. Engelhard, Jr.'s Cragwood Stables, Harry and Jane Lunger's Christiana Stables, Hope Hanes, wife of the president of the New York Racing Association, and for William Haggin Perry with whom he enjoyed some of his greatest successes. Although Maloney's career was interrupted by service with the United States military during World War II, in all he trained forty-two stakes race winners including two Champions: Lamb Chop in 1963 and Hall of Fame inductee Gamely in 1968.

Jim Maloney died at age 74 on March 10, 1984, at the Mayo Clinic in Rochester, Minnesota.
