= Walter M. Jeffords Sr. =

Walter M. Jeffords
- Born: August 8, 1883; Philadelphia, Pennsylvania, United States
- Died: September 28, 1960 (aged 77); Glen Riddle, Pennsylvania, United States
- Education: Yale University
- Occupation(s): Businessman, Thoroughbred horse owner/breeder
- Known for: Exemplar of Racing, Faraway Farm
- Board member of: National Museum of Racing and Hall of Fame, Thoroughbred Club of America
- Spouse: Sarah Dobson Fiske
- Children: Walter M. Jeffords Jr.

Walter Morrison Jeffords Sr. (August 8, 1883 – September 28, 1960) was a successful Investment banker and owner/breeder of Thoroughbred racehorses who, in partnership with his wife's uncle, Samuel Riddle, purchased and operated Faraway Farm near Lexington Kentucky where they stood Man o' War.

Jeffords is one of only five people to be named an Exemplar of Racing by the National Museum of Racing and Hall of Fame.

His former estate is now Ridley Creek State Park.
