= Westchester Stakes (NYRA) =

American Thoroughbred horse race

- Class: Grade III
- Location: Belmont Park; Elmont, New York
- Inaugurated: 1918
- Race type: Thoroughbred – Flat racing
- Website: NYRA

Race information
- Distance: 1 mile (8 furlongs)
- Surface: Dirt
- Track: Left-handed
- Qualification: Three-years-old & up
- Weight: 124 lbs. with allowances
- Purse: US$175,000 (2023)

The Westchester Stakes is a Grade III American Thoroughbred horse race for three-years-old and older run over a distance of one mile annually in early May at Belmont Park, in Elmont, New York. The event currently offers a purse of $175,000 added.

== History ==
Originally called the Yorktown Handicap, it was first run in 1918 at the old Empire City Race Track and was won by the 1916 Kentucky Derby winner George Smith.

For 1919, it was called the Victory Handicap, but in 1922 reverted to the Yorktown Handicap. There was no race run in 1932 and 1933 during the Great Depression.

In 1940 it was renamed the name Westchester Handicap in honor of Westchester County, New York. The race was hosted by the Jamaica Racetrack from 1943 to 1959 yet idle between 1954 and 1958. After which it was shifted to Aqueduct Racetrack.

From 1959 to 1971, the race was open to horses age four years old and up.

Since 2012 the event has been run at Belmont Park.

== Records ==
Speed record:

- 1:32.24 – 1 mile: Najran (2003)

Most wins:

- 2 – Thorson (1936, 1937)
- 2 – R. Thomas (1966, 1968)
- 2 – Rubiano (1991, 1992)
- 2 – Gygistar (2004, 2005)

Most wins by a jockey:

- 5 – Ángel Cordero Jr. (1969, 1972, 1976, 1984, 1990)

Most wins by a trainer:

- 6 – H. Allen Jerkens (1975, 1982, 1983, 1994, 1998, 2010)

Most wins by an owner:

- 3 – Alfred G. Vanderbilt II (1935, 1973, 1974)
- 3 – King Ranch (1946, 1947, 1948)
- 3 – Edward P. Evans (2001, 2004, 2005)

== Winners ==
| Year | Winner | Age | Jockey | Trainer | Owner | Dist. (Miles) | Time | Win$ | Gr. |
|---|---|---|---|---|---|---|---|---|---|
| 2026 | Antiquarian | 5 | John R. Velazquez | Todd A. Pletcher | Centennial Farms | 1 m | 1:35.42 | $162,750 | G3 |
| 2025 | Bishops Bay | 5 | Flavien Prat | Brad H. Cox | Spendthrift Farm, Steve Landers, Martin S. Schwartz, Michael Dubb, Ten Strike Racing, Jim Bakke, Titletown Racing, Kuber Racing, Big Easy Racing, Rick Kanter, Michael Caruso & WinStar Farm | 1 m | 1:34.19 | $175,000 | G3 |
| 2024 | Messier | 5 | Jose Antonio Gomez | Richard E. Dutrow Jr. | SF Racing, Madaket Stables, Lansdon B. Robbins III, Tom J. Ryan, Robert E. Masterson, Jay A. Schoenfarbar, Waves Edge Capital LLC, Catherine Donovan, Golconda Stable & Siena Farm | 1 m | 1:34.50 | $175,000 | G3 |
| 2023 | Repo Rocks | 5 | Ruben Silvera | Jamie Ness | Double B Racing Stables | 1 m | 1:34.96 | $175,000 | G3 |
| 2022 | Cody's Wish | 4 | Junior Alvarado | William I. Mott | Godolphin | 1 m | 1:34.68 | $110,00 | G3 |
| 2021 | Dr Post | 4 | Manuel Franco | Todd A. Pletcher | Cloyce C. Clark | 1 m | 1:35.14 | $110,000 | G3 |
| 2020 | Code of Honor | 4 | John Velazquez | C. R. McGaughey III | William S. Farish III | 1 m | 1:42.39 | $55,000 | G3 |
| 2019 | Nicodemus | 4 | Mike Luzzi | Linda Rice | Everything's Cricket Racing (Avram C. Freedberg) & Lawrence Goichman | 1 m | 1:35.07 | $110,000 | G3 |
| 2018 | Tale of Silence | 4 | Dylan Davis | Barclay Tagg | Charles E. Fipke | 1 m | 1:36.14 | $120,000 | G3 |
| 2017 | Connect | 4 | Irad Ortiz Jr. | Chad Brown | Paul Pompa Jr. | 1 m | 1:36.49 | $120,000 | G3 |
| 2016 | Anchor Down | 5 | José Ortiz | Todd A. Pletcher | Alto Racing LLC | 1 m | 1:35.10 | $90,000 | G3 |
| 2015 | Tonalist | 4 | Joe Bravo | Christophe Clement | Robert S. Evans | 1 m | 1:34.07 | $90,000 | G3 |
| 2014 | Palace Malice | 4 | John R. Velazquez | Todd A. Pletcher | Dogwood Stable/Three Chimneys Farm | 1 m | 1:35.53 | $90,000 | G3 |
| 2013 | Flat Out | 7 | Junior Alvarado | William I. Mott | Preston Stables (Art Preston) | 1 m | 1:32.99 | $90,000 | G3 |
| 2012 | To Honor and Serve | 4 | Jose Lezcano | William I. Mott | Live Oak Racing (Charlotte Weber) | 1 m | 1:34.84 | $90,000 | G3 |
| 2011 | Caixa Eletronica | 6 | Cornelio Velásquez | Todd A. Pletcher | Repole Stable | 1 m | 1:34.26 | $60,000 | G3 |
| 2010 | Le Grand Cru | 5 | Cornelio Velásquez | H. Allen Jerkens | Judson L. Streicher | 1 m | 1:34.89 | $60,000 | G3 |
| 2009 | Bribon | 6 | Alan Garcia | Robert Ribaudo | Marc Keller | 1 m | 1:35.38 | $66,000 | G3 |
| 2008 | Divine Park | 4 | Alan Garcia | Kiaran McLaughlin | James J. Barry | 1 m | 1:32.74 | $65,460 | G3 |
| 2007 | Utopia | 7 | Mike Luzzi | Saeed bin Suroor | Sheikh Mohammed | 1 m | 1:33.23 | $64,620 | G3 |
| 2006 | Sir Greeley | 4 | Eibar Coa | James A. Jerkens | Timber Bay Farm (William J. Entenmann) & Denise (Entenmann) Walsh | 1 m | 1:33.69 | $65,280 | G3 |
| 2005 | Gygistar | 6 | Javier Castellano | Mark A. Hennig | Edward P. Evans | 1 m | 1:33.50 | $65,700 | G3 |
| 2004 | Gygistar | 5 | Joe Bravo | Mark A. Hennig | Edward P. Evans | 1 m | 1:35.89 | $65,700 | G3 |
| 2003 | Najran | 4 | Edgar Prado | Nick Zito | Buckram Oak Farm (Mahmoud Fustok) | 1 m | 1:32.24 | $65,820 | G3 |
| 2002 | Free of Love | 4 | Jerry D. Bailey | Richard Violette Jr. | Anthony J. Aprilante & Ralph M. Evans | 1 m | 1:35.56 | $67,500 | G3 |
| 2001 | Cat's At Home | 4 | Filiberto Leon | Mark A. Hennig | Edward P. Evans | 1 m | 1:33.60 | $64,920 | G3 |
| 2000 | Yankee Victor | 4 | Heberto Castillo Jr. | Carlos Morales | Moreton Binn, et al. | 1 m | 1:34.37 | $66,000 | G3 |
| 1999 | Mr. Sinatra | 5 | Chuck C. Lopez | Gasper Moschera | Barbara J. Davis | 1 m | 1:35.04 | $64,202 | G3 |
| 1998 | Wagon Limit | 4 | Jean-Luc Samyn | H. Allen Jerkens | Joseph V. Shields Jr. | 1 m | 1:34.06 | $66,420 | G3 |
| 1997 | Pacific Fleet | 5 | Frank Alvarado | Alfredo Callejas | Robert Perez | 1 m | 1:33.88 | $65,940 | G3 |
| 1996 | Valid Wager | 4 | Julio Pezua | Bruce N. Levine | Harry T. Mangurian Jr. | 1 m | 1:34.74 | $66,240 | G3 |
| 1995 | Mr. Shawklit | 4 | Mike Luzzi | Frank Laboccetta | Edward & Judith Anchel | 1 m | 1:34.66 | $65,760 | G3 |
| 1994 | Virginia Rapids | 4 | Jean-Luc Samyn | H. Allen Jerkens | Middletown Stables (Joseph & William Stavola) | 1 m | 1:34.52 | $65,640 | G3 |
| 1993 | Bill Of Rights | 4 | Jean-Luc Samyn | Thomas D. (Tim) Kelly | Boketo Stable | 1 m | 1:34.69 | $72,720 | G3 |
| 1992 | Rubiano | 5 | José A. Santos | Flint S. Schulhofer | Centennial Farms (Donald Little) | 1 m | 1:34.83 | $68,880 | G3 |
| 1991 | Rubiano | 4 | Jerry D. Bailey | Flint S. Schulhofer | Centennial Farms (Donald Little) | 1 m | 1:34.94 | $71,520 | G3 |
| 1990 | Once Wild | 5 | Ángel Cordero Jr. | John J. Lenzini Jr. | Gary Marano | 1 m | 1:35.00 | $67,800 | G3 |
| 1989 | Lord of the Night | 6 | Jorge Velásquez | Dominick Galluscio | Winbound Farms (Raymond Wennik) | 1 m | 1:35.60 | $71,040 | G3 |
| 1988 | Faster Than Sound | 4 | Julie Krone | D. Wayne Lukas | H. Joseph Allen | 1 m | 1:34.40 | $108,000 | G3 |
| 1987 | King's Swan | 7 | José A. Santos | Richard E. Dutrow Sr. | Alvin Akman | 1 m | 1:36.20 | $69,120 | G3 |
| 1986 | Garthorn | 6 | Rafael Meza | Robert J. Frankel | Jerome S. Moss | 1 m | 1:33.80 | $75,240 | G3 |
| 1985 | Verbarctic | 5 | Gregg McCarron | Garner H. Vinson | Garner H. Vinson | 1 m | 1:36.60 | $53,460 | G3 |
| 1984 | Jacque's Tip | 4 | Ángel Cordero Jr. | John Parisella | Theodore M. Sabarese | 1 m, 70 yds. | 1:41.80 | $55,440 | G3 |
| 1983 | Singh Tu | 4 | Jean-Luc Samyn | H. Allen Jerkens | Top The Marc Stable (Joseph Taub) | 1 m | 1:35.20 | $33,780 | G3 |
| 1982-1 | Fabulous Find | 4 | Juan Cintron | H. Allen Jerkens | Top The Marc Stable (Joseph Taub) | 1 m | 1:38.00 | $33,330 | G3 |
| 1982-2 | John Casey | 5 | Jeffrey Fell | Floreano Fernandez | Julie Miron | 1 m | 1:38.00 | $33,090 | G3 |
| 1981 | Dunham's Gift | 4 | Michael Venezia | Bob G. Dunham | Carl Hughes Jr. | 1 m | 1:35.00 | $33,000 | G3 |
| 1980 | Nice Catch | 6 | Jeffrey Fell | Frank Wright | October House Farm | 1 m | 1:36.80 | $34,020 | G3 |
| 1979 | Vencedor | 5 | Ruben Hernandez | Luis Barrera | Armando Cosme | 1 1/16 m | 1:44.00 | $33,060 | G2 |
| 1978 | Pumpkin Moonshine | 4 | Dave Borden | Howard M. Tesher | H. Joseph Allen | 1 1/16 m | 1:44.40 | $32,250 | G2 |
| 1977 | Cinteelo | 4 | Eddie Maple | Thomas J. Kelly | John M. Schiff | 1 1/16 m | 1:43.40 | $33,090 | G2 |
| 1976 | Double Edge Sword | 6 | Ángel Cordero Jr. | Richard E. Dutrow Sr. | Aisquith Stable (Elmer W. Aisquith) | 1 m | 1:33.40 | $34,170 | G2 |
| 1975 | Step Nicely | 5 | Jorge Velásquez | H. Allen Jerkens | Hobeau Farm | 1 m | 1:34.00 | $33,900 | G2 |
| 1974 | Dundee Marmalade | 6 | Michael Hole | Robert P. Lake | Alfred G. Vanderbilt II | 1 m | 1:36.00 | $32,940 | G2 |
| 1973 | North Sea | 4 | Robyn Smith | Robert P. Lake | Alfred G. Vanderbilt II | 1 m | 1:33.60 | $33,990 | G2 |
| 1972 | Autobiography | 4 | Ángel Cordero Jr. | Pancho Martin | Sigmund Sommer | 1 m | 1:34.20 | $34,560 | |
| 1971 | Never Bow | 5 | Victor Tejada | Pancho Martin | Sigmund Sommer | 1 m | 1:36.40 | $35,580 | |
| 1970 | Dewan | 5 | Eddie Belmonte | James W. Maloney | William Haggin Perry | 1 m | 1:34.20 | $37,440 | |
| 1969 | Iron Ruler | 4 | Ángel Cordero Jr. | Edward J. Yowell | October House Farm | 1 m | 1:34.00 | $36,335 | |
| 1968 | R. Thomas | 7 | Jimmy Nichols | David Erb | Roger W. Wilson | 1 m | 1:35.40 | $36,335 | |
| 1967 | Advocator | 4 | Manuel Ycaza | Clyde Troutt | Ada L. Rice | 1 m | 1:35.40 | $35,815 | |
| 1966 | R. Thomas | 5 | Larry Adams | David Erb | Roger W. Wilson | 1 m | 1:36.20 | $37,375 | |
| 1965 | Tibaldo | 5 | Braulio Baeza | Thomas J. Kelly | Esther D. du Pont | 1 m | 1:36.60 | $39,130 | |
| 1964 | Rocky Link | 4 | Donald Pierce | Stephen A. DiMauro | Golden Triangle Stables (Thomas A. Eazor) | 1 m | 1:35.20 | $18,947 | |
| 1963 | Sunrise County | 4 | John L. Rotz | Thomas J. Kelly | Townsend B. Martin | 1 m | 1:34.20 | $18,005 | |
| 1962 | Globemaster | 4 | John L. Rotz | Thomas J. Kelly | Leonard P. Sasso | 1 m | 1:34.60 | $18,687 | |
| 1961 | Mail Order | 5 | Larry Adams | Larry H. Thompson | Alamode Farm | 1 m | 1:34.00 | $18,655 | |
| 1960 | Vendetta | 4 | Jack Leonard | Walter F. Wickes Jr. | Mrs. Walter F. Wickes Jr. | 1 m | 1:35.20 | $19,005 | |
| 1959 | Mystic II | 5 | Mike Sorrentino | Morris Dixon | C. Mahlon Kline | 1 1/16 m | 1:43.60 | $18,452 | |
| 1954 | – 1958 | Race not held | | | | | | | |
| 1953 | Cold Command | 4 | Hedley Woodhouse | Sylvester Veitch | C. V. Whitney | 1 1/8 m | 1:49.60 | $33,150 | |
| 1952 | Battlefield | 4 | Albert Schmidl | Winbert F. Mulholland | George D. Widener Jr. | 1 1/8 m | 1:50.20 | $38,350 | |
| 1951 | Bryan G. | 4 | Ovie Scurlock | Casey Hayes | Christopher Chenery | 1 1/8 m | 1:49.20 | $21,100 | |
| 1950 | Palestinian | 4 | Sam Boulmetis Sr. | Hirsch Jacobs | Isidor Bieber | 1 3/16 m | 1:57.20 | $25,100 | |
| 1949 | Three Rings | 4 | Hedley Woodhouse | Willie Knapp | Evelyn L. Hopkins | 1 3/16 m | 1:56.80 | $20,200 | |
| 1948 | Better Self | 3 | Dave Gorman | Max Hirsch | King Ranch | 1 3/16 m | 1:57.80 | $39,600 | |
| 1947 | Bridal Flower | 4 | Warren Mehrtens | James W. Smith | King Ranch | 1 3/16 m | 1:59.20 | $39,700 | |
| 1946 | Assault | 3 | Eddie Arcaro | Max Hirsch | King Ranch | 1 3/16 m | 1:56.40 | $38,600 | |
| 1945 | Stymie | 4 | Robert Permane | Hirsch Jacobs | Ethel D. Jacobs | 1 3/16 m | 1:56.80 | $38,765 | |
| 1944 | Seven Hearts | 4 | Paul Keiper | W. Graves Sparks | J. Graham Brown | 1 3/16 m | 1:58.00 | $23,515 | |
| 1943 | Slide Rule | 3 | Jack Westrope | Cecil Wilhelm | William E. Boeing | 1 3/16 m | 1:57.60 | $22,700 | |
| 1942 | Riverland | 4 | Alfred Robertson | Moody Jolley | Louisiana Farm (Harold A. Clark) | 1 3/16 m | 1:56.40 | $19,850 | |
| 1941 | Gramps | 4 | Herb Lindberg | John M. Gaver Sr. | John Hay Whitney | 1 3/16 m | 1:59.80 | $19,650 | |
| 1940 | Mioland | 3 | Leon Haas | R. Thomas Smith | Charles S. Howard | 1 3/16 m | 2:00.20 | $15,950 | |
| 1939 | Third Degree | 3 | Eddie Arcaro | John M. Gaver Sr. | Greentree Stable | 1 1/8 m | 1:51.40 | $7,250 | |
| 1938 | Great Union | 3 | Sam Renick | Louis Feustel | Elizabeth Graham Lewis | 1 1/8 m | 1:52.00 | $6,550 | |
| 1937 | Thorson | 5 | E. Roberts | Thomas H. McCreery | Buckley M. Byers | 1 1/8 m | 1:52.00 | $7,550 | |
| 1936 | Thorson | 4 | Eddie Arcaro | Thomas H. McCreery | Buckley M. Byers | 1 1/8 m | 1:52.00 | $4,790 | |
| 1935 | Good Harvest | 3 | Sam Renick | Joseph H. Stotler | Alfred G. Vanderbilt II | 1 1/8 m | 1:51.80 | $4,550 | |
| 1934 | King Saxon | 3 | Thomas Malley | C. H. "Pat" Knebelkamp | C. H. "Pat" Knebelkamp | 1 1/8 m | 1:54.40 | $1,985 | |
| 1932 | – 1933 | Race not held | | | | | | | |
| 1931 | Dr. Freeland | 5 | Johnny Bethal | Thomas J. Healey | Walter J. Salmon Sr. | 1 1/8 m | 1:53.60 | $2,880 | |
| 1930 | Questionnaire | 3 | Charles Kurtsinger | Andy Schuttinger | James Butler | 1 1/8 m | 1:53.60 | $4,650 | |
| 1929 | Genie | 4 | Willie Kelsay | Henry McDaniel | Gifford A. Cochran | 1 1/8 m | 1:52.00 | $4,930 | |
| 1928 | Arcturus | 3 | George Schreiner | A. Jack Joyner | George D. Widener Jr. | 1 1/8 m | 1:53.00 | $4,970 | |
| 1927 | Light Carbine | 4 | Charles Zoeller | Michael J. Dunleavy | Ira B. Humphreys | 1 1/8 m | 1:53.60 | $5,390 | |
| 1926 | Cloudland | 4 | Laverne Fator | Frank E. Brown | Frank E. Brown | 1 1/8 m | 1:53.80 | $4,970 | |
| 1922 | – 1926 | Race not held | | | | | | | |
| 1921 | Yellow Hand | 4 | C. H. Miller | A. J. Goldsborough | Charles A. Stoneham | 1 1/4 m | 2:05.60 | $4,850 | |
| 1920 | Mad Hatter | 4 | Earl Sande | Sam Hildreth | Rancocas Stable | 1 1/4 m | 2:07.40 | $4,550 | |
| 1919 | Star Master | 5 | Clarence Kummer | Walter B. Jennings | A. Kingsley Macomber | 1 1/4 m | 2:09.20 | $2,275 | |
| 1918 | George Smith | 5 | Frank Robinson | Preston M. Burch | John Sanford | 1 1/8 m | 1:51.60 | $2,150 | |
