= Washington Park Futurity Stakes =

Washington Park Futurity
- Class: Discontinued stakes
- Location: Washington Park Race Track; Woodlawn, Chicago, Illinois, United States
- Inaugurated: 1937
- Race type: Thoroughbred - Flat racing
- Website: n/a

Race information
- Distance: 6.5 furlongs
- Surface: Dirt
- Track: left-handed
- Qualification: Two-year-olds
- Weight: Assigned
- Purse: $200,000

The Washington Park Futurity Stakes was an American Thoroughbred horse race run annually at the now defunct Washington Park Race Track in Woodlawn, Chicago. A race on dirt for two-year-olds, it was first run in 1937 as a six furlong event. Placed on hiatus for two years, it returned as an annual feature in 1940.

From 1959 through 1961 the race was hosted by Chicago's Arlington Park race track where it was run at a distance of 6 1/2 furlongs. Made permanent at Arlington Park, the Washington Park Futurity was merged with the Arlington Futurity Stakes and is known as the Arlington-Washington Futurity Stakes.

== Race notes ==
During its tenure, the Washington Park Futurity hosted some of the best horses in the United States.

- The 1941 edition was won by future U.S. Racing Hall of Fame inductee, Alsab.
- In 1947, Bewitch won, Citation finished second, and Free America was third. All three horses were owned by Calumet Farm and all were trained by Jimmy Jones.
- 1953 winner Hasty Road went on to win the 1954 Preakness Stakes
- 1959 winner Venetian Way won the next year's Kentucky Derby

== Records ==
Speed record: (at distance of 6 furlongs)

- 1:09.60 - Swoon's Son (1955), Restless Wind (1958), Venetian Way (1959)

Most wins by a jockey:

- 3 - Bill Hartack (1956, 1957, 1961)

Most wins by an owner:

- 3 - John Marsch (1942, 1943, 1944)
- 3 - Fred W. Hooper (1946, 1956, 1960)

== Winners ==
Year	Winner	Jockey	Trainer	Owner	Time
1961	Ridan	Bill Hartack	LeRoy Jolley	Mrs. Moody Jolley	1:18.00
1960	Crozier	Braulio Baeza	Charles R. Parke	Fred W. Hooper	1:15.20
1959	Venetian Way	Manuel Gonzalez	Victor J. Sovinski	Sunny Blue Farm	1:09.60
1958	Restless Wind	Bill Shoemaker	Horatio Luro	Llangollen Farm Stable	1:09.60
1957	Jewel's Reward	Bill Hartack	Ivan H. Parke	Maine Chance Farm	1:11.20
1956	Greek Game †	Bill Hartack	Ivan H. Parke	Fred W. Hooper	1:10.80
1955	Swoon's Son	David Erb	Lex Wilson	E. Gay Drake	1:09.60
1954	Royal Note	Eddie Arcaro	Frank Gilpin	Wilton Stable	1:10.80
1953	Hasty Road	Eddie Arcaro	Harry Trotsek	Hasty House Farm	1:12.80
1952	Mr. Paradise	Eddie Arcaro	Howard C. Hoffman	Ada L. Rice	1:10.60
1951	Oh Leo	Paul J. Bailey	Milton Resseguet	James H. Dunn	1:10.20
1950	To Market	Angel Rivera	William J. Hirsch	Sam A. Mason II	1:12.00
1949	Curtice	Ovie Scurlock	Robert V. McGarvey	Jean Denemark	1:10.20
1948	Model Cadet	Anthony Skoronski	Tom Smith	Ada L. Rice	1:12.20
1947	Bewitch	Douglas Dodson	Jimmy Jones	Calumet Farm	1:10.40
1946	Education	John Adams	Ivan H. Parke	Fred W. Hooper	1:12.20
1945	Revoked	Albert Bodiou	Howard Wells	Dr. Eslie Ashbury	1:11.80
1944	Free For All	Otto Grohs	Burley Parke	John Marsch	1:12.00
1943	Occupy	Lyle Whiting	Burley Parke	John Marsch	1:13.40
1942	Occupation	Lester Balaski	Burley Parke	John Marsch	1:12.00
1941	Alsab	Robert Vedder	Sarge Swenke	Albert Sabath	1:11.00
1940	Porter's Cap	Carroll Bierman	Tom Smith	Charles S. Howard	1:12.80
1937	Tiger	Alfred Robertson	Robert V. McGarvey	Milky Way Farm Stable	1:11.00

† In 1956, California Kid won but was disqualified bumping in the stretch and set back to second.
