= Grey Lag Handicap =

- Class: Discontinued
- Location: Aqueduct Racetrack; Queens, New York, United States
- Inaugurated: 1941
- Race type: Thoroughbred - Flat racing

Race information
- Distance: 1 3/16 miles (9.5 furlongs)
- Surface: Dirt
- Track: left-handed
- Qualification: Three-years-old & up
- Weight: Assigned
- Purse: $75,000

The Grey Lag Handicap was an American Thoroughbred horse race run annually at Aqueduct Racetrack in Queens, New York. Open to horses age three and older, in its final years it was contested on dirt over a distance of one and three-sixteenths miles (9.5 furlongs).

Inaugurated on May 10, 1941, at the Jamaica Race Course, the race was named in honor of 1921 American Horse of the Year and U.S. Racing Hall of Fame inductee, Grey Lag. It was last run in 1999 at Aqueduct Racetrack as a Grade III event.

Winners of the Grey Lag Handicap include U.S. Racing Hall of Fame inductees Assault, Nashua, Arts and Letters, Stymie, Sword Dancer, and Tom Fool.

== Records ==
Speed record:

- 1 1/8 miles: 1:47.33 - Conveyor (1993)
- 1 3/16 miles: 1:56.98 80 - Brushing Up (1998)

Most wins:

- 2 - Stymie (1945, 1946)

Most wins by a jockey:

- 2 - Johnny Longden (1942, 1944)
- 2 - Ted Atkinson (1952, 1956)
- 2 - Bobby Ussery (1957, 1962)
- 2 - Larry Adams (1961, 1969)
- 2 - John L. Rotz (1963, 1968)
- 2 - Jorge Velasquez (1974, 1985)
- 2 - Mike Venezia (1979, 1982)
- 2 - Jean-Luc Samyn (1984, 1987)
- 2 - Richard Migliore (1986, 1997)
- 2 - Jose A. Santos (1988, 1989)

Most wins by a trainer:

- 3 - Max Hirsch (1941, 1947, 1964)
- 3 - J. Elliott Burch (1960, 1970, 1973)
- 3 – Gasper S. Moschera (1984, 1996, 1997)

Most wins by an owner:

- 2 - Ethel D. Jacobs (1945, 1946)
- 2 - Rokeby Stable (1970, 1973)

== Winners ==
Year	Winner	Age	Jockey	Trainer	Owner	Dist. (Miles)	Time	Win $	Gr.
1999	Carta de Amor	6	Vladimir Diaz	Juan Serey	John Rotella	13/16 M	1:56.98	$49,575	G3
1998	Brushing Up	5	Julio M. Pezua	Victor Simone	Victor & Phyllis Simone	13/16 M	1:56.80	$49,080	G3
1997	More To Tell	6	Richard Migliore	Gasper S. Moschera	Barbara J. Davis	13/16 M	1:57.88	$50,190	G3
1996	Iron Gavel	6	Frank T. Alvarado	Gasper S. Moschera	Joques Farm	13/16 M	1:57.86	$49,395	G3
1995	Danzig's Dance	6	Jorge F. Chavez	John Parisella	Karen S. Zablowitz	13/16 M	1:57.23	$63,720	G3
1994	As Indicated	4	Robbie Davis	Richard E. Schosberg	Heatherwood Farm	11/8 M	1:49.42	$65,355	G3
1993	Conveyor	5	Caesar Bisono	D. Wayne Lukas	Cloyce K. Box	11/8 M	1:47.33	$69,810	G3
1992	Shots Are Ringing	5	Herb McCauley	Peter Ferriola	Jewel E. Stable	11/8 M	1:50.40	$66,930	G3
1991	Apple Current	4	Art Madrid Jr.	John M. Veitch	Buckram Oak Farm (Mahmoud Fustok)	11/8 M	1:47.38	$66,480	G3
1990	Double Blush	4	Mike E. Smith	Richard A. DeStasio	Saud Bin Khaled	11/8 M	1:49.51	$49,770	G3
1989	Lay Down	5	Jose A. Santos	James E. Baker	Ogden Mills Phipps	11/8 M	1:50.00	$51,180	G3
1988	King's Swan	8	Jose A. Santos	Richard E. Dutrow Sr.	Alvin Akman	11/8 M	1:50.60	$66,000	G3
1987	Proud Debonair	5	Jean-Luc Samyn	William D. Curtis Jr.	Sam F. Morrell	11/8 M	1:49.40	$69,720	G3
1986	Artichoke	5	Richard Migliore	D. Wayne Lukas	Tom Gentry	11/8 M	1:52.60	$51,120	G3
1985	Imp Society	4	Jorge Velasquez	D. Wayne Lukas	Brereton C. Jones	11/8 M	1:50.20	$50,130	G3
1984	Moro	5	Jean-Luc Samyn	Gasper S. Moschera	Albert Davis	11/8 M	1:51.60	$52,920	G3
1983	Sing Sing	5	Rolando Alvarado Jr.	H. Allen Jerkens	Sugartown Stable (Fred Papert)	11/8 M	1:50.20	$33,483	G3
1982	Globe	5	Mike Venezia	Victor J. Nickerson	Globe Syndicate (N. B. Hunt)	11/8 M	1:50.40	$50,850	G3
1981	Irish Tower	4	Jeffrey Fell	Stanley M. Hough	Malcolm Winfield	11/8 M	1:51.40	$51,210	G3
1980	I'm It	5	Angel Santiago	Bruce N. Levine	Bruce N. Levine	11/8 M	1:50.40	$52,290	G3
1979	Special Tiger	4	Mike Venezia	William F. Schmitt	Alfred Fried Jr.	11/8 M	1:53.60	$49,410	G2
1978	On The Sly	5	Gregg McCarron	Melvin W. Gross	Balmak Stable (Mary Streit)	11/8 M	1:52.60	$48,915	G2
1977	Turn and Count	4	Steve Cauthen	Frank "Pancho" Martin	Sigmund Sommer	11/8 M	1:50.60	$49,590	G2
1976	Royal Glint	6	Michael Hole	Gordon R. Potter	Dan Lasater	11/8 M	1:49.20	$49,725	G2
1975	Gold and Myrrh	4	Walter Blum	William B. Wilmot	William F. Wilmot	11/4 M	2:01.60	$50,895	G2
1974	Prove Out	5	Jorge Velasquez	H. Allen Jerkens	Hobeau Farm	11/4 M	2:01.20	$50,625	G2
1973	Summer Guest	4	Jacinto Vasquez	J. Elliott Burch	Rokeby Stable	11/4 M	2:01.60	$52,110	G2
1972	Droll Role	4	Eddie Maple	Thomas J. Kelly	John M. Schiff	11/4 M	2:02.40	$50,085	
1971	Judgable	4	Ron Turcotte	Herbert Nadler	Saul Nadler	11/8 M	1:49.60	$51,420	
1970	Arts and Letters	4	Braulio Baeza	J. Elliott Burch	Rokeby Stable	11/8 M	1:48.40	$55,022	
1969	Bushido	3	Larry Adams	Anthony J. Lombardi	Susan B. Fisher	7 F	1:22.60	$37,960	
1968	Bold Hour	4	John L. Rotz	Winbert F. Mulholland	George D. Widener Jr.	11/8 M	1:48.80	$55,250	
1967	Moontrip	6	Angel Cordero Jr.	Kay Erik Jensen	Ewing Kauffman	11/8 M	1:49.60	$54,405	
1966	Selari	4	Johnny Sellers	Harold Young	Valley Farm	11/8 M	1:50.40	$54,697	
1965	Quita Dude	5	Ismael Valenzuela	William A. Reavis	Sidney B. Factor	11/8 M	1:49.40	$55,282	
1964	Saidam	5	Manuel Ycaza	Max Hirsch	Mrs. J. Deaver Alexander	11/8 M	1:48.40	$53,527	
1963	Sunrise County	4	John L. Rotz	Thomas J. Kelly	Townsend B. Martin	11/8 M	1:49.80	$55,152	
1962	Ambiopoise	4	Bobby Ussery	Thomas M. Waller	Robert Lehman	11/8 M	1:49.00	$55,770	
1961	Mail Order	5	Larry Adams	Larry H. Thompson	Modie J. Spiegel	11/8 M	1:50.20	$56,420	
1960	Sword Dancer	4	Eddie Arcaro	J. Elliott Burch	Brookmeade Stable	11/8 M	1:49.60	$44,800	
1959	Vertex	5	Sam Boulemetis	Joseph F. Piarulli	Frank Brunetti & J. F. Piarulli	11/8 M	1:51.00	$54,887	
1958	Oh Johnny	5	William Boland	Norman R. McLeod	Mrs. Wallace Gilroy	11/8 M	1:50.00	$37,750	
1957	Kingmaker	4	Bobby Ussery	Frank I. Wright	Happy Hill Farm (Cortwright & Ella Wetherill)	11/8 M	1:48.20	$39,400	
1956	Nashua	4	Ted Atkinson	James E. Fitzsimmons	Belair Stud	11/8 M	1:50.60	$37,100	
1954	1955	Race not held							
1953	Find	3	Eric Guerin	William C. Winfrey	Alfred Gwynne Vanderbilt	11/8 M	1:50.20	$44,700	
1952	Tom Fool	3	Ted Atkinson	John M. Gaver Sr.	Greentree Stable	11/8 M	1:49.40	$42,200	
1951	Cochise	5	Ovie Scurlock	Virgil W. Raines	Brandyine Stable	11/8 M	1:50.00	$19,700	
1950	Lotowhite	3	Keith Stuart	Frank S. Barnett	Thomas G. Benson	11/16 M	1:44.40	$20,350	
1949	Royal Governor	5	Ovie Scurlock	James E. Ryan	Esther D. du Pont Weir	11/16 M	1:44.40	$20,600	
1948	Race not held								
1947	Assault	4	Warren Mehrtens	Max Hirsch	King Ranch	11/8 M	1:49.80	$32,325	
1946	Stymie	5	Hedley Woodhouse	Hirsch Jacobs	Ethel D. Jacobs	11/8 M	1:49.60	$24,750	
1945	Stymie	4	Robert Permane	Hirsch Jacobs	Ethel D. Jacobs	11/8 M	1:49.80	$10,700	
1944	First Fiddle	5	Johnny Longden	Edward V. Mulrenan	Mrs. Edward V. Mulrenan	11/8 M	1:49.60	$12,400	
1943	Boysy	7	Joe Cavens	Tommy Heard Jr.	Tommy Heard Jr.	11/8 M	1:50.60	$14,150	
1942	Marriage	6	Johnny Longden	Rene A. Coward	Roy A. Coward	11/8 M	1:52.00	$13,600	
1941	Dit	4	Alfred Robertson	Max Hirsch	W. Arnold Hanger	11/8 M	1:51.40	$8,075	
