= Laurel Futurity Stakes top three finishers =

American stakes race

This is a listing of the horses that finished in either first, second, or third place and the number of starters in the Laurel Futurity Stakes, an American stakes race for two-year-olds at 1-1/16 miles (8.5 furlongs) on the turf held at Laurel Park Racecourse in Laurel, Maryland. (List 1921–present)

Year	Winner	Second	Third	Starters
2020				-
2019	**Irish Mias**	Torres Del Paine	Doc Boy	8
2018	**Order and Law**	Scrap Copper	Veterans Beach	14
2017	**Therapist**	Stroll Smokin	Majestic Dunhill	9
2016	**Caribou Club**	Undulated	Greatbullsoffire	6
2015	**Formal Summation**	Captain Alex	Thunder Pass	9
2014	**Cyclogenisis**	One Eyed Ray	Tazmanian Charlie	8
2013	**Yes I'm Lucky**	Tiger Bourbon	King Racer	8
2012	**Tate's Landing**	Star Maneuver	Lunar Rock	10
2011	**Lemon Juice**	Magical Season	Just Sayin	9
2010	No Race	No Race	No Race	n/a
2009	No Race	No Race	No Race	n/a
2008	No Race	No Race	No Race	n/a
2007	**Cowboy Cal**	Casanova Jack	Titan of Industry	n/a
2006	**Strike a Deal**	Rutledge Cat	Brainy Benny	n/a
2005	**Barbaro**	Diabolical	Exton	n/a
2004	**Defer**	Funk	Woody's Apache	n/a
2003	**Tapit**	Polish Rifle	Ghost Mountain	n/a
2002	**Toccet**	Irontron	Cherokee's Boy	n/a
2001	No Race	No Race	No Race	n/a
2000	**Buckle Down Ben**	Gift of the Eagle	Niner's Echo	n/a
1999	**Scottish Halo**	Un Fino Vino	Grundlefoot	n/a
1998	**Millions**	Raire Standard	More Better	n/a
1997	**Fight for M'Lady**	Victory Gallop	Essential	n/a
1996	**Captain Bodgit**	Concerto	Carrolls Favorite	n/a
1995	**Appealing Skier**	Liberty Road	Pirate Performer	n/a
1994	**Western Echo**	Old Tascosa	Shimmering Prince	n/a
1993	**Dove Hunt**	Lotsa Chile	Thrilla In Manilla	n/a
1992	**Lord of the Bay**	Glorieux Dancer	Halissee	n/a
1991	**Smilin and Dancin**	Free At Last	Older But Smarter	n/a
1990	**River Traffic**	Fourstars Allstar	Share the Glory	n/a
1989	**Go And Go**	Robyn Dancer	Super Cholo	n/a
1988	**Luge**	Rigerman	Downtown Davey	n/a
1987	**Antiqua**	Mister Modesty	Kohen Witha K	n/a
1986	**Bet Twice**	Pledge Card	Grand Rol	n/a
1985	**Southern Appeal**	Miracle Wood	Papal Power	n/a
1984	**Mighty Appealing**	Cutlass Reality	Rhoman Rule	n/a
1983	**Devil's Bag**	Hail Bold King	Pied A'Tierre	n/a
1982	**Cast Party**	Pax in Bello	Primitive Pleasure	n/a
1981	**Deputy Minister**	Laser Light	Majesty's Prince	n/a
1980	**Cure the Blues**	Matching Gift	Kan Reason	n/a
1979	**Plugged Nickle**	Gold Stage	New Regent	n/a
1978	**Spectacular Bid**	General Assembly	Clever Trick	n/a
1977	**Affirmed**	Alydar	Star de Naskra	n/a
1976	**Royal Ski**	For the Moment	Medieval Man	n/a
1975	**Honest Pleasure**	Whatsyourpleasure	Dance Spell	n/a
1974	**L'Enjoleur**	Wajima	Bombay Duck	n/a
1973	**Protagonist**	Hasty Flyer	Prince of Reason	n/a
1972	**Secretariat**	Stop The Music	Angle Light	n/a
1971	**Riva Ridge**	Festive Mood	Drum Fire	n/a
1970	**Limit to Reason**	New Round	Droll Role	n/a
1969	**High Echelon**	Toasted	Brave Emperor	n/a
1968	**King Emperor**	Dike	Mr. Leader	n/a
1967	**Vitrolic**	T. V. Commercial	Gin-Rob	n/a
1966	**In Reality**	Successor	Proviso	n/a
1965	**Spring Double**	Fathers Image	Amberoid	n/a
1964	**Sadair**	Hail to All	Umbrella Fella	n/a
1963	**Quadrangle**	Breakspear	Bupers	n/a
1962	**Right Proud**	Delta Judge	Master Dennis	n/a
1961	**Crimson Satan**	Green Ticket	Endymion	n/a
1960	**Garwol**	Bal Musette	Sherluck	n/a
1959	**Progressing**	All Hands	Catapult	n/a
1958	**Intentionally**	Rico Tesio	Black Hills	n/a
1957	**Jewel's Reward**	Nala	Staysail	n/a
1956	**Missile**	Cohoes	Ambehaving	n/a
1955	**Nail**	Liberty Sun	Countermand	n/a
1954	**Thinking Cap**	Flying Fury	Saratoga	n/a
1953	**Errand King**	War Doings	Nirgal Lad	n/a
1952	**Isasmoothie**	Count Cain	County Clare	n/a
1951	**Cajun**	Lord Priam	Inyureye	n/a
1950	**Big Stretch**	Bold	General Staff	n/a
1949	**Oil Capitol**	Lot O Luck	Striking	n/a
1948	**Capot**	Slam Bang	Sun Bahram	n/a
1947	**Citation**	Better Self	Ace Admiral	n/a
1946	**Jet Pilot**	Fervent	Bastogne	n/a
1945	**Star Pilot**	Billy Bumps	Colony Boy	n/a
1944	**Pot o' Luck**	Plebiscite	Recce	n/a
1943	**Platter**	By Jimminy	Smolensko	n/a
1942	**Count Fleet**	Occupation	Vincentive	n/a
1941	**Contradiction**	Devil Diver	Chiquita Mia	n/a
1940	**Bold Irishman**	Whirlaway	Our Boots	n/a
1939	**Bimelech**	Rough Pass	Straight Lead	n/a
1938	**Challedon**	Third Degree	Gilded knight	n/a
1937	**Nedayr**	Jacola	Dauber	n/a
1936	**Matey**	Brooklyn	Billionaire	n/a
1935	**Hollyrood**	Grand Slam	Ned Reigh	n/a
1934	No Race	No Race	No Race	n/a
1933	No Race	No Race	No Race	n/a
1932	**Swivel**	Golden Way	Repaid	n/a
1931	**Top Flight**	Burgoo King	Tick On	n/a
1930	**Equipoise**	Twenty Grand	Mate	n/a
1929	**Flying Heels**	Spinach	Galaday	n/a
1928	**High Strung**	Dr. Freeland	Neddie	n/a
1927	**Glade**	Petee-Wrack	Eugene S.	n/a
1926	**Fair Star**	Jopagan	Whiskery	n/a
1925	**Canter**	Bubbling Over	Display	n/a
1924	**Stimulus**	Star Lore	Candy Kid	n/a
1923	**Beau Butler**	Rustic	Aga Khan	n/a
1922 #	**Blossum Time**	Donges	Little Celt	n/a
1922 #	**Sally's Alley**	Martingale	My Own	n/a
1921	**Morvich**	Lucky Hour	Runantell	n/a

A # designates that the race was run in two divisions in 1922.

== See also ==
- Laurel Futurity Stakes
- Laurel Park Racecourse
