= Laurel Futurity Stakes =

- Class: Listed Stakes
- Location: Laurel Park Racecourse, Laurel, Maryland, United States
- Inaugurated: 1921
- Race type: Thoroughbred – Flat racing
- Website: www.laurelpark.com

Race information
- Distance: 8.5 furlongs
- Surface: Turf
- Track: Left-handed
- Qualification: Two-years-old
- Weight: Assigned
- Purse: US$150,000

The Laurel Futurity is an American Thoroughbred horse race held annually in late September at Laurel Park Racecourse in Laurel, Maryland. Run over a distance of 1 1/16 miles on turf, at one time it was a Grade I stakes race on dirt, and one of the richest and most important races for two-year-old American thoroughbreds. When the race was moved from the dirt to the turf in 2005, it lost its graded status and was subsequently ineligible for grading in 2006. The race was finally cancelled in 2008 for economic reasons. It was announced by Laurel Park that the famed race would be restored in 2011 and run on October 8 at 6 furlongs.

Originally known as the Pimlico Futurity (the race began at Pimlico Race Course in 1921, only moving to Laurel in 1969 where it was briefly known as the Pimlico-Laurel Futurity). Past winners include Triple Crown champions Count Fleet, Citation, Secretariat and Affirmed, who defeated his arch rival Alydar in this race.

== Records ==
Speed record:

- 1 1/16 miles – 1:40.17 – Barbaro (2005)
- 1 1/8 miles – 1:49.35 – Scottish Halo (1999)
- 1 mile – 1:39.00 – High Strung (1928)
- 7 1/2 furlongs – 1:30.70 – Appealing Skier (1995)

Most wins by an owner:

- 4 – Greentree Stable (1927, 1948, 1950, 1982)

Most wins by a jockey:

- 3 – Edgar Prado (1994, 1998, 2007)
- 3 – Bill Shoemaker (1957, 1958, 1961)
- 3 – Douglas Dodson (1944, 1947, 1954)
- 3 – John Gilbert (1932, 1940, 1946)
- 3 – Albert Johnson (1921, 1922, 1923)

Most wins by a trainer:

- 3 – George M. Odom (1924, 1928, 1955)

== Winners ==
Year	Winner	Jockey	Trainer	Owner	Dist. (Miles)	Time	Purse$	Gr.
2025	Proton	Jorge Ruiz	H. Graham Motion	Stone Farm, Deborah A. Easter, Clyde Linwood Miles Jr., Lynwood Napier, Ken Wheeler Jr.	1 1/16 mi.	1:44.43	$125,000	B/T
2024	Pascaline	Victor Carrasco	Arnaud Delacour	West Point Thoroughbreds, CJ Stables, Jimmy Kahig Racing Stables, Edwin Barker	1 mi (on dirt)	1:38.87	$150,000	
2023	Air Recruit	Charlie Marquez	Arnaud Delacour	Mark B. Grier	1 1/16 mi.	1:46.95	$150,000	B/T
2022	Congruent	Feargal Lynch	Antonio Sano	Tami Bobo & Luis Lugamo Racing Stable LLC	1 1/16 mi.	1:40.45	$150,000	B/T
2021	Ready to Purrform	Jevian Toledo	Brad H. Cox	Donegal Racing (Jerry Crawford, managing partner)	1 1/16 mi.	1:43.03	$150,000	
2020	Catman	Daniel Centeno	Michael J. Maker	Paradise Farms Corp., et al.	1 1/16 mi.	1:50.51	$150,000	
2019	Irish Mias	Manuel Franco	H. Graham Motion	Isabelle de Tomaso	1 1/16 mi.	1:44.03	$100,000	
2018	Order and Law	Feargal Lynch	Louis C. Linder Jr.	Bran Jam Stable	5 1/2 fur.	1:14.94	$100,000	
2017	Therapist	Daniel Centeno	Christophe Clement	Oak Bluff Stables	5 1/2 fur.	1:09.50	$100,000	
2016	Caribou Club	Ashley Castrenze	Thomas F. Proctor	Glen Hill Farm	5 1/2 fur.	1:02.59	$100,000	
2015	Formal Summation	Antonio Gallardo	Kathleen M. O'Connell	Lynne Martin-Boutte	5 1/2 fur.	1:06.21	$75,000	
2014	Cyclogenisis	Trevor McCarthy	George Weaver	Matthew Schera	5 1/2 fur.	1:01.94	$100,000	
2013	Yes I'm Lucky	Chris DeCarlo	Edward J. Plesa Jr.	Trilogy Stable	5 1/2 fur.	1:01.30	$100,000	
2012	Tate's Landing	Alex Cintron	Mike Pino	Copper Penny Stable	5 1/2 fur.	1:02.08	$150,000	
2011	Lemon Juice	Travis Dunkelberger	Dane Kobiski	PTK, LLC	6 fur.	1:11.38	$75,000	
2008	2010	Race not held						
2007	Cowboy Cal	Edgar Prado	Todd A. Pletcher	Stonerside Stable	1 1/16 mi.	1:42.80	$100,000	
2006	Strike A Deal	Ramon Domínguez	Alan E. Goldberg	Jayeff B Stables	1 1/16 mi.	1:45.94	$100,000	
2005‡	Barbaro	Jose C. Caraballo	Michael R. Matz	Lael Stables	1 1/16 mi.	1:40.17	$125,000	III
2004	Defer	Jerry D. Bailey	C. R. McGaughey III	Ogden Mills Phipps	1 1/16 mi.	1:45.48	$100,000	III
2003	Tapit	Ramon Domínguez	Michael Dickinson	Ron Winchell	1 1/16 mi.	1:43.81	$100,000	III
2002	Toccet	Jorge Chavez	John F. Scanlan	Daniel M. Borislow	1 1/16 mi.	1:46.10	$100,000	III
2001	Race not held							
2000	Buckle Down Ben	Mike McCarthy	Steve Klesaris	Steve Klesaris	1 1/8 mi.	1:51.93	$100,000	III
1999	Scottish Halo	Tommy Turner	Paul Rizzo	John C. Oxley	1 1/8 mi.	1:49.35	$100,000	III
1998	Millions	Edgar Prado	Leon Blusiewicz	Clayton J. Peters	1 1/8 mi.	1:51.52	$100,000	III
1997	Fight for M'Lady	Carlos Marquez Jr.	Ben Perkins Jr.	Gene Cox	1 1/8 mi.	1:53.63	$100,000	III
1996	Captain Bodgit	Frank Douglas	Gary Capuano	Team Valor	1 1/8 mi.	1:49.53	$100,000	III
1995	Appealing Skier	Rick Wilson	Ben Perkins Sr.	Everett Novak	7 1/2 fur.	1:30.70	$100,000	III
1994	Western Echo	Edgar Prado	Bud Delp	Tea Party Stable	7 1/2 fur.	1:30.82	$135,000	III
1993	Dove Hunt	Robbie Davis	Neil J. Howard	William S. Farish III	1 1/16 mi.	1:49.03	$135,000	III
1992	Lord of the Bay	Rick Wilson	J. Edwin Salzman Jr.	Sidney L. Port	1 1/16 mi.	1:45.54	$200,000	III
1991	Smiling and Dancin	Richard Migliore	Stephen L. DiMauro	Robert J. Sullivan	1 1/16 mi.	1:48.77	$300,000	III
1990	River Traffic	Cash Asmussen	John E. Hammond	Henri Chalhoub	1 1/16 mi.	1:44.80	$300,000	III
1989	Go and Go	Craig Perret	Dermot K. Weld	Moyglare Stud Farm	1 1/16 mi.	1:44.00	$300,000	II
1988	Luge II	José A. Santos	Thomas J. Skiffington	Dogwood Stable	1 1/16 mi.	1:45.20	$300,000	I
1987	Antiqua	Cash Asmussen	Jonathan Pease	Nelson Bunker Hunt	1 1/16 mi.	1:46.00	$250,000	I
1986	Bet Twice	Craig Perret	Warren A. Croll Jr.	Robert Levy & Cisley Stable	1 1/16 mi.	1:45.00	$250,000	I
1985	Southern Appeal	Jesse Davidson	Marvin Moncrief	Howard M. Bender	1 1/16 mi.	1:44.20	$215,000	I
1984	Mighty Appealing	Gregg P. Smith	Dean Gaudet	Israel Cohen	1 1/16 mi.	1:43.00	$215,000	I
1983	Devil's Bag	Eddie Maple	Woody Stephens	Hickory Tree Stable	1 1/16 mi.	1:42.20	$230,000	I
1982	Cast Party	Jorge Velásquez	Robert Reinacher Jr.	Greentree Stables	1 1/16 mi.	1:45.00	$242,000	I
1981	Deputy Minister	Don MacBeth	John J. Tammaro Jr.	Marjoh A. Levy	1 1/16 mi.	1:44.60	$200,000	I
1980	Cure the Blues	Rudy L. Turcotte	LeRoy Jolley	Bertram R. Firestone	1 1/16 mi.	1:44.40	$152,000	I
1979	Plugged Nickle	Buck Thornburg	Thomas J. Kelly	John M. Schiff	1 1/16 mi.	1:43.80	$180,000	I
1978	Spectacular Bid	Ronnie Franklin	Bud Delp	Hawksworth Farm	1 1/16 mi.	1:41.60	$140,000	I
1977	Affirmed	Steve Cauthen	Laz Barrera	Harbor View Farm	1 1/16 mi.	1:44.20	$140,000	I
1976	Royal Ski	Jack Kurtz	John J. Lenzini Jr.	Gerald Cheevers	1 1/16 mi.	1:44.00	$140,000	I
1975	Honest Pleasure	Braulio Baeza	LeRoy Jolley	Bertram R. Firestone	1 1/16 mi.	1:42.80	$150,000	I
1974	L'Enjoleur	Sandy Hawley	Yonnie Starr	Jean-Louis Levesque	1 1/16 mi.	1:42.60	$125,000	I
1973	Protagonist	Angel Santiago	John P. Campo	Elmendorf Farm	1 1/16 mi.	1:43.20	$133,000	I
1972	Secretariat	Ron Turcotte	Lucien Laurin	Meadow Stable	1 1/16 mi.	1:42.80	$133,000	
1971	Riva Ridge	Ron Turcotte	Lucien Laurin	Meadow Stud	1 1/16 mi.	1:43.40	$150,000	
1970	Limit to Reason	Jean Cruguet	Thomas J. Kelly	Brookmeade Stable	1 1/16 mi.	1:44.80	$205,000	
1969	High Echelon	Manuel Ycaza	Hirsch Jacobs	Ethel D. Jacobs	1 1/16 mi.	1:44.20	$190,000	
1968	King Emperor	Eddie Belmonte	Edward A. Neloy	Wheatley Stable	1 1/16 mi.	1:44.00	$190,000	
1967	Vitriolic	Braulio Baeza	Edward A. Neloy	Ogden Phipps	1 1/16 mi.	1:45.20	$190,000	
1966	In Reality	John L. Rotz	Melvin Calvert	Frances Genter	1 1/16 mi.	1:45.80	$202,000	
1965†	Spring Double	Herbert Hinojosa	J. Bowes Bond	Alene S. Erlanger	1 1/16 mi.	1:44.80	$225,000	
1964	Sadair	Manuel Ycaza	Les Lear	Mary B. Hecht	1 1/16 mi.	1:43.80	$190,000	
1963	Quadrangle	Bill Hartack	J. Elliott Burch	Rokeby Stables	1 1/16 mi.	1:47.20	$190,000	
1962	Right Proud	Jack Leonard	Clyde Troutt	Ada L. Rice	1 1/16 mi.	1:47.00	$125,000	
1961	Crimson Satan	Bill Shoemaker	Gordon R. Potter	Crimson King Farm	1 1/16 mi.	1:46.40	$125,000	
1960	Garwol	Ismael Valenzuela	Burley Parke	Harbor View Farm	1 1/16 mi.	1:45.80	$112,000	
1959	Progressing	Hedley Woodhouse	William C. Winfrey	Wheatley Stable	1 1/16 mi.	1:45.40	$120,000	
1958	Intentionally	Bill Shoemaker	Edward I. Kelly Sr.	Brookfield Farm	1 1/16 mi.	1:46.00	$200,000	
1957	Jewel's Reward	Bill Shoemaker	Ivan H. Parke	Maine Chance Farm	1 1/16 mi.	1:44.20	$190,000	
1956	Missile	Pete Anderson	Woody Stephens	John A. Morris	1 1/16 mi.	1:45.00	$120,000	
1955	Nail	Hedley Woodhouse	George P. "Maje" Odom	Josephine Bigelow	1 1/16 mi.	1:47.00	$112,000	
1954	Thinking Cap	Douglas Dodson	Henry S. Clark	Christiana Stable	1 1/16 mi.	1:46.80	$88,000	
1953	Errard King	Sam Boulmetis	Thomas J. Barry	Joseph Gavegnano	1 1/16 mi.	1:45.20	$102,500	
1952	Isasmoothie	Bobby Mitchell	Edward I. Kelly Sr.	Brookfield Farm	1 1/16 mi.	1:46.60	$100,000	
1951	Cajun	Nick Shuk	not found	Hal Price Headley	1 1/16 mi.	1:47.60	$77,500	
1950	Big Stretch	Ted Atkinson	John M. Gaver Sr.	Greentree Stable	1 1/16 mi.	1:45.40	$75,000	
1949	Oil Capitol	Earl Knapp	Harry Trotsek	Hasty House Farm	1 1/16 mi.	1:44.20	$75,000	
1948	Capot	Ted Atkinson	John M. Gaver Sr.	Greentree Stable	1 1/16 mi.	1:45.80	$75,000	
1947	Citation	Douglas Dodson	Ben A. Jones	Calumet Farm	1 1/16 mi.	1:48.80	$60,000	
1946	Jet Pilot	John Gilbert	R. Thomas Smith	Maine Chance Farm	1 1/16 mi.	1:46.00	$60,000	
1945	Star Pilot	Arnold Kirkland	R. Thomas Smith	Maine Chance Farm	1 1/16 mi.	1:47.80	$60,000	
1944	Pot O'Luck	Douglas Dodson	Ben A. Jones	Calumet Farm	1 1/16 mi.	1:46.40	$60,000	
1943	Platter	Conn McCreary	Bert Mulholland	George D. Widener Jr.	1 1/16 mi.	1:47.60	$60,000	
1942	Count Fleet	Johnny Longden	Don Cameron	Fannie Hertz	1 1/16 mi.	1:43.40	$50,000	
1941	Contradiction	Ken McCombs	Ross O. Higdon	Woolford Farm	1 1/16 mi.	1:47.40	$55,000	
1940	Bold Irishman	John Gilbert	Jim Fitzsimmons	Gladys Mills Phipps	1 1/16 mi.	1:49.80	$55,000	
1939	Bimelech	Fred A. Smith	William A. Hurley	Idle Hour Stock Farm	1 1/16 mi.	1:45.20	$55,000	
1938	Challedon	George Seabo	Louis Schaefer	Branncastle Farm	1 1/16 mi.	1:45.80	$48,000	
1937	Nedayr	Wayne Wright	William A. Crawford	Willis Sharpe Kilmer	1 1/16 mi.	1:45.20	$48,000	
1936†	Matey	Harry Richards	Preston M. Burch	Walter M. Jeffords Sr.	1 1/16 mi.	1:46.80	$42,000	
1935	Hollyrood	Silvio Coucci	Duval A. Headley	Hal Price Headley	1 1/16 mi.	1:46.60	$75,000	
1933	1934	Race not held						
1932	Swivel	John Gilbert	Jack R. Pryce	Adolphe Pons	1 1/16 mi.	1:46.80	$104,000	
1931	Top Flight	Raymond Workman	Thomas J. Healey	C. V. Whitney	1 1/16 mi.	1:44.80	$93,000	
1930	Equipoise	Raymond Workman	Thomas J. Healey	C. V. Whitney	1 1/16 mi.	1:48.60	$84,000	
1929	Flying Heels	Willie Kelsay	Henry McDaniel	Gifford A. Cochran	1 1/16 mi.	1:47.00	$93,000	
1928	High Strung	Linus McAtee	George M. Odom	Robert L. Gerry Sr.	1 mile	1:39.00	$85,000	
1927	Glade	Lewis Morris	Thomas W. Murphy	Greentree Stable	1 mile	1:41.80	$90,000	
1926	Fair Star	Ovila Bourassa	Carl Utz	Foxcatcher Farms	1 mile	1:40.60	$100,000	
1925	Canter	Clarence Turner	Harry Rites	J. Edwin Griffith	1 mile	1:40.80	$90,000	
1924	Stimulus	Harold Thurber	George M. Odom	Marshall Field III	1 mile	1:39.80	$82,000	
1923	Beau Butler	George Carroll	Herbert J. Thompson	Edward R. Bradley	1 mile	1:39.80	$90,000	
1922 #	Blossom Time	Albert Johnson	Herbert J. Thompson	Edward R. Bradley	1 mile	1:39.20	$68,500	
1922 #	Sally's Alley	Albert Johnson	Eugene Wayland	Willis Sharpe Kilmer	1 mile	1:39.80	$68,500	
1921	Morvich	Albert Johnson	Fred Burlew	Benjamin Block	1 mile	1:42.00	$72,000	

- ‡ In 2005, the race was switched to the turf.
- † Fathers Image finished 1st in 1965 but was disqualified.
- † Privileged won in 1936 but was disqualified for interference and set back to last.
- # The race was run in two divisions in 1922.

== See also ==
- Laurel Futurity Stakes top three finishers
