= Milton Menasco =

American painter and silent film art director (1890–1974

Milton Menasco (January 22, 1890 – June 7, 1974) was an American painter of horses and art director of silent films. A native of Los Angeles, he lived in Kentucky for 26 years.

== Early life ==
He was born in 1890 in Los Angeles, California.

== Career ==
Menasco began his art career in the early days of Hollywood, when his "blood and thunder" posters enticed movie fans into theaters to watch the first silent pictures. He was commissioned to do mural paintings at the Palace of Fine Arts in San Francisco for the World's Fair in 1915.

His vivid use of colors and graphics won him recognition in Hollywood, where he worked on 33 films—29 times as art director and twice as set director.

In 1925, he was the architecture and set director for the original film based on Sir Arthur Conan Doyle's The Lost World. This film received accolades for its innovative art direction and special effects. To quote one review in the NewTimes: "And while Harry O. Hoyt is credited as director, a host of fellow auteurs must take credit for Lost World's still impressive thrills, especially the effects work of Willis O'Brien (who would later animate King Kong in 1933) and the wild set design from Milton Menasco." A complete list of Menasco's film credits is given here.

In 1925, Menasco went to New York City as art director for a filmmaking company and turned to advertising. He also painted portraits and water colors of horses and ships during this time which he sold in the city's galleries.

During World War II, Life magazine commissioned him to draw air and sea battles to chronicle the war in Europe and in the Pacific Theater.

After the war, Menasco moved to Kentucky to devote himself entirely to his real love, horse portraiture. Here he painted the equine racing greats of the nation and helped with art direction at the Thoroughbred Record and Sporting News. He and his wife purchased a farm where an old brick house built in the 18th century served for many years as his studio.

Horsemen admired the richness and feeling reflected in Menasco's paintings, and his clients included John Hay Whitney, Isabel Dodge Sloane, President Ronald Reagan and Allaire du Pont. One of his first large paintings was for Lucille Markey depicting nine of her horses at Calumet Farm, including Citation, Coaltown and others grouped in the track with exercise boys up. Menasco also painted Secretariat for owner Penny Chenery.

In 1953, Menasco painted the broodmare La Troienne in a work entitled La Troienne and Her Foals: Eighteen Vignettes and One Painting Together in One Frame for John Whitney. The painting was exhibited at the New York Metropolitan Museum of Art and the National Museum of Racing and Hall of Fame in Saratoga Springs, New York. In 1999, it sold from the estate of Betsey Cushing Roosevelt Whitney through Sotheby's auction house for £74,000 (c. US$120,000).

In 1957, Menasco painted Doubledogdare and Delta for Arthur B. Hancock, Jr. The artist explained that although the actual painting had taken him about three months to complete, "behind it goes all the training, study and experience of my life."

A distinguishing mark of Menasco's paintings is the detail to sky and landscape backgrounds. A perfect example of this detail is apparent in Nashua, with Eddie Arcaro up, painted by Menasco at Hialeah Park for Leslie Combs II. The background shows the track and a ring of palm trees.

== Death ==
Milton Menasco died in 1974 of a heart attack at his farm in Versailles, Kentucky.
