= Nadir (horse) =

American-bred Thoroughbred racehorse

- Sire: Nasrullah
- Grandsire: Nearco
- Dam: Gallita
- Damsire: Challenger II
- Sex: Stallion
- Foaled: 1955
- Country: United States
- Colour: Bay
- Breeder: Claiborne Farm
- Owner: Claiborne Farm
- Trainer: Moody Jolley
- Rider: Bill Hartack
- Record: 32: 11-7-8
- Earnings: US$434,316

Major wins
- Garden State Stakes (1957); American Derby (1958); Select Handicap (1958)

Awards
- DRF American Champion Two-Year-Old Colt (1957)

Nadir (foaled March 15, 1955) was a Thoroughbred racehorse who was one of two colts voted the American Champion Two-Year-Old Colt of 1957. He was bred and raced by Bull Hancock's Claiborne Farm.

== World's richest race & Championship year ==
Racing under trainer Moody Jolley, Nadir made eight starts at age two and won five times including an October 26, 1957 victory in the world's richest horse race, the Garden State Stakes at Garden State Park for which he earned a purse of $155,047. A few days later, Claiborne Farm owner Bull Hancock turned down an offer of $1 million for the colt from Travis Kerr.

Nadir was voted American Champion Two-Year-Old Colt by the Daily Racing Form. The rival Thoroughbred Racing Association and Turf & Sports Digest polls were topped by Jewel's Reward.

== Racing at ages 3 & 4 ==
Nadir went into 1958 as one of the early favorites for the Kentucky Derby. Based at Florida's Hialeah Park Race Track, he had a win at seven furlongs early in the year, but in the mile and an eighth Flamingo Stakes he ran fourth to Tim Tam, finishing more than seven lengths behind the winner. In April, he ran second in the Blue Grass Heights Purse at Keeneland won by Tim Tam in track record time. In his next start, the Derby Trial at Churchill Downs, Nadir was again beaten by winner Tim Tam, this time finishing fourth. Withdrawn from the Kentucky Derby and the remainder of the Triple Crown races, for a short time Nadir competed at shorter distances. On June 14, the colt won his first stakes race of 1958, taking the six-furlong Select Handicap at Monmouth Park in Oceanport, New Jersey by a nose. In August, he captured the mile and one-eighth American Derby at Chicago's Arlington Park, a win that was the last major victory of his career. Nadir ended 1958 with five wins in all and purse money totaling $204,312. As a four-year-old in 1959, he made eight starts, winning once. His best result in top-level races was a second in the prestigious Widener Handicap.

Nadir was retired to stand at stud at his owner's Claiborne Farm. For the eight years he served stallion duty in the United States, he met with modest success. The best of his offspring to race was the multiple stakes winning gelding R. Thomas. Beginning in 1968, Nadir stood for breeders in Japan, where he also had limited success. He died there in 1978.

== Nadir backwards ==
In 1960, Nadir's trainer, Moody Jolley, purchased a yearling colt from Claiborne Farm that he named Ridan, which is Nadir spelled backwards.

== Pedigree ==
Pedigree of Nadir
Sire Nasrullah	Nearco	Pharos	Phalaris
Sire Nasrullah	Nearco	Pharos	Scapa Flow
Sire Nasrullah	Nearco	Nogara	Havresac
Sire Nasrullah	Nearco	Nogara	Catnip
Sire Nasrullah	Mumtaz Begum	Blenheim	Blandford
Sire Nasrullah	Mumtaz Begum	Blenheim	Malva
Sire Nasrullah	Mumtaz Begum	Mumtaz Mahal	The Tetrarch
Sire Nasrullah	Mumtaz Begum	Mumtaz Mahal	Lady Josephine
Dam Gallita	Challenger II	Swynford	John O'Gaunt
Dam Gallita	Challenger II	Swynford	Canterbury Pilgrim
Dam Gallita	Challenger II	Sword Play	Great Sport
Dam Gallita	Challenger II	Sword Play	Flash of Steel
Dam Gallita	Gallette	Sir Gallahad III	Teddy
Dam Gallita	Gallette	Sir Gallahad III	Plucky Liege
Dam Gallita	Gallette	Flambette	Durbar
Dam Gallita	Gallette	Flambette	La Flambee
