= Beaugay =

American Thoroughbred racehorse

- Sire: Stimulus
- Grandsire: Ultimus
- Dam: Risk
- Damsire: Sir Gallahad III
- Sex: Filly
- Foaled: 1943
- Country: United States
- Color: Bay
- Breeder: Arthur B. Hancock
- Owner: Maine Chance Farm
- Trainer: 1) Tom Smith; 2) James W. Smith
- Record: 18: 9-3-0
- Earnings: US$$148,070

Major wins
- Polly Drummond Stakes (1945); Princess Pat Stakes (1945); Arlington Lassie Stakes (1945); Matron Stakes (1945); Fashion Stakes (1945); Colonial Handicap (1946); New Rochelle Handicap (1947)

Awards
- American Champion Two-Year-Old Filly (1945)

Honors
- Beaugay Stakes at Belmont Park

Beaugay (foaled 1943 in Kentucky) was an American Thoroughbred racehorse who was voted the 1945 American Champion Two-Year-Old Filly. Bred by Arthur B. Hancock at his Claiborne Farm near Paris, Kentucky, she was purchased at the 1944 July Selected Yearling sale for $22,000 by cosmetics queen Elizabeth Arden who campaigned her under the name of her Maine Chance Farm.

== Racing career ==
For U.S. Racing Hall of Fame trainer Tom Smith, Beaugay won her first six starts including five major events for her age and gender. In winning the Polly Drummond Stakes at Delaware Park Racetrack, she set a new track record for five furlongs of fifty eight seconds flat. In what would be her final start in 1945 she went up against male opponents in the Futurity Stakes at Belmont Park. Coming down the homestretch, Beaugay veered towards the rail and crashed into the fence. She suffered multiple lacerations, a deep cut on her left hind ankle, and a left shoulder bruise. The injuries severely affected her career and was never again the dominant runner she had been. Under new trainer, Canadian James W. Smith, Beaugay did return to race the following year and notably won the 1946 Colonial Handicap at Garden State Park Racetrack and the 1947 New Rochelle Handicap at Jamaica Race Course.

The Beaugay Stakes at Belmont Park is named in her honor.
