= Star Pilot (horse) =

American-bred Thoroughbred racehorse

- Sire: Sickle
- Grandsire: Phalaris
- Dam: Floradora
- Damsire: Bull Dog
- Sex: Stallion
- Foaled: 1943
- Country: United States
- Colour: Brown
- Breeder: Coldstream Stud
- Owner: Maine Chance Farm
- Trainer: Tom Smith; Roy Waldron; Jimmy Smith
- Record: 17:6-4-2
- Earnings: $187,885

Major wins
- Hopeful Stakes (1945); Belmont Futurity Stakes (1945); Pimlico Futurity (1945); Ardsley Handicap (1945)

Awards
- American Champion Two-Year-Old Colt (1945)
- Last updated on October 4, 2007

Star Pilot (foaled 1943 in Kentucky) was an American thoroughbred race horse. Sired by Joseph Widener's English stakes winner Sickle, he was out of the mare Floradora, whose French sire, Bull Dog, was one of the leading sires of stakes winners in the 1950s.

He was sold as a yearling to Elizabeth Arden of Maine Chance Farm for $26,000.

Second in the Champagne Stakes and Grand Union Hotel Stakes, Star Pilot won the Pimlico Futurity, Hopeful Stakes, Belmont Futurity, and Ardsley Handicap, rounding out the year as the American Champion Two-Year-Old Colt.

The following year, however, Star Pilot lost to stablemate Knockdown in his first race of the season and then placed second again to Knockdown in the Santa Anita Derby, where his rider had no whip. He didn't race again until he was five, when he ran unsuccessfully in three starts and was retired.

== Retirement ==
Star Pilot was retired to Maine Chance Farm. His best winner out of 72 foals was the 1949 filly Star Enfin.
