= Jewel's Reward =

American-bred Thoroughbred racehorse

- Sire: Jet Jewel
- Grandsire: Jet Pilot
- Dam: Belle Jeep
- Damsire: War Jeep
- Sex: Stallion
- Foaled: 1955
- Country: United States
- Colour: Bay
- Breeder: Maine Chance Farm
- Owner: Maine Chance Farm
- Trainer: 1) Ivan H. Parke; 2) William Molter
- Record: 22: 7-5-2
- Earnings: US$448,592

Major wins
- Champagne Stakes (1956); Cowdin Stakes (1956); Pimlico Futurity Stakes (1956); Washington Park Futurity Stakes (1956); Tremont Stakes (1956); Wood Memorial Stakes (1957)

Awards
- TSD & TRA American Two-Year-Old Colt (1957)

Jewel's Reward (March 10, 1955 – September 16, 1959) was a Thoroughbred Champion racehorse. He was voted the American Champion Two-Year-Old Colt of 1957 by the Thoroughbred Racing Association and Turf & Sports Digest magazine. The rival Daily Racing Form poll was topped by Nadir. Owned by the Maine Chance Farm of "Cosmetics Queen" Elizabeth Arden, Jewel's Reward was trained by National Museum of Racing and Hall of Fame inductee Ivan Parke.

Following his championship year, in which he won more money than any other two-year-old in history, at age three Jewel's Reward was ranked a top contender for the U.S. Triple Crown series after winning the Wood Memorial Stakes at Belmont Park in Elmont, New York. However, an injury during a workout hampered the colt and after being sent off as the betting favorite, he ran fourth in the Kentucky Derby and seventh in the Preakness Stakes. Later that year, Jewel's Reward was sent to race in California, where he was trained by Bill Molter.

Returned to the East Coast, in August 1959 the four-year-old Jewel's Reward came down with colic and died on September 16 in his barn at Belmont Park.
