= R. Thomas =

American-bred Thoroughbred racehorse

- Sire: Nadir
- Grandsire: Nasrullah
- Dam: Fleet Flight
- Damsire: Count Fleet
- Sex: Gelding
- Foaled: 1961
- Country: United States
- Colour: Bay
- Breeder: Claiborne Farm
- Owner: Roger W. Wilson
- Trainer: David Erb
- Record: 65: 20-11-14
- Earnings: US$381,809

Major wins
- Skaal Handicap (1964); Vosburgh Handicap (1965); Westchester Handicap (1966, 1968); Carousel Handicap (1967); Sport Page Handicap (1967); Sysonby Handicap (1967); Equipoise Mile Handicap (1968); Salvator Mile Handicap (1968)

R. Thomas (March 13, 1961 – 1971) was an American Thoroughbred racehorse bred in Kentucky by Bull Hancock at his renowned Claiborne Farm. Sired by Nadir, the 1957 American Co-Champion Two-Year-Old Colt, his dam was Fleet Flight, a daughter of 1948 U.S. Triple Crown champion, Count Fleet.

Raced by Roger W. Wilson, and trained by former jockey David Erb, R. Thomas was a top handicap horse in American middle-distance racing during the mid-1960s. Among his wins, the bay gelding captured two editions of the Westchester Handicap at Aqueduct Racetrack in Queens, New York.
