= David Erb =

American jockey (1923–2019)

Personal information
- Born: November 28, 1923 Grand Island, Nebraska, U.S.
- Died: November 22, 2019 (aged 95) Saratoga Springs, New York, U.S.
- Occupation: Jockey / Trainer / Owner

Horse racing career
- Sport: Horse racing
- Career wins: Not found

Major racing wins
- As a jockey: Hollywood Lassie Stakes (1951); Stars and Stripes Handicap (1954, 1955); Arlington Futurity (1955); Arlington Lassie Stakes (1955); Bashford Manor Stakes (1955); Californian Stakes (1955); Washington Park Futurity (1955); Arlington Classic (1956); Clark Handicap (1956); Flamingo Stakes (1956); Florida Derby (1956); Pimlico Special (1956); St. Louis Derby (1956); Churchill Downs Handicap (1957); Gallorette Handicap (1957); Equipoise Mile Handicap (1957, 1958); Black Helen Handicap (1958); Blue Grass Stakes (1958); Comely Stakes (1959); National Stallion Stakes (1959) American Classic Race wins: Kentucky Derby (1956); Belmont Stakes (1956) As a trainer: Vosburgh Stakes (1965); Westchester Handicap (1966, 1968); Bewitch Stakes (1967); Fashion Stakes (1967); Sport Page Handicap (1967); Sysonby Handicap (1967); Juvenile Stakes (1970); Comely Stakes (1972); Remsen Stakes (1973)

Significant horses
- As a jockey: Swaps, Mark-Ye-Well, Swoon's Son, Needles, Iron Liege, Searching, Bally Ache; As a trainer: Hurry to Market, R. Thomas

David Erb (November 28, 1923 – November 22, 2019) was an American jockey and trainer in Thoroughbred horse racing. He started riding as a young farm boy and began his professional riding career in 1938, competing at tracks in his native Nebraska. He got his first win at Oaklawn Park Race Track in Hot Springs, Arkansas.

Born in Grand Island, Nebraska, as boy David Erb's family moved to a farm at York, Nebraska. He had his first introduction to horse racing at a Nebraska State Fair which triggered a desire to become a jockey and at age fifteen he rode competitively for the first time at a bush track in Clay Center, Nebraska.

In the June 18, 1955 Californian Stakes at Hollywood Park Racetrack, Dave Erb was the substitute rider for the suspended Bill Shoemaker aboard Swaps. Erb piloted the three-year-old colt to a world record time of 1:40 2/5 for a mile and a sixteenth on dirt. That same year, Dave Erb became the regular jockey for future U.S. Racing Hall of Fame inductee, Swoon's Son. Ridden by Erb in all but one of his twenty-two career stakes race wins, they competed primarily at tracks in Chicago and Kentucky.

In 1956 Erb won the most important races of his career aboard the future Hall of Fame colt, Needles. After winning the Flamingo Stakes and the Florida Derby, Erb and Needles narrowly missed winning the American Triple Crown. They won the Kentucky Derby, finished second to Fabius in the Preakness Stakes, then won the Belmont Stakes.

After retiring as a jockey in 1960, Dave Erb trained horses. In 1963, he enjoyed great success with the colt Hurry to Market who was voted American Co-Champion Two-Year-Old Colt.

David Erb retired from the industry in 1988. He and wife, Lenni, settled on a small farm near Greenfield Center, New York. In 2008, Dave Erb became the 29th jockey to add his handprint and signature in cement to the "Gallup to Glory" display at the Galt House hotel in Louisville, Kentucky.

Erb was a contestat on the TV game show To Tell the Truth on February 26, 1957.

In September 2019, Erb, then aged 95 and suffering from dementia went missing and an alert was sent out to the general public. He was later found safe. However, he died two months later, a week shy of this 96th birthday.
