= Ivan H. Parke =

American horse trainer and jockey

Ivan Parke
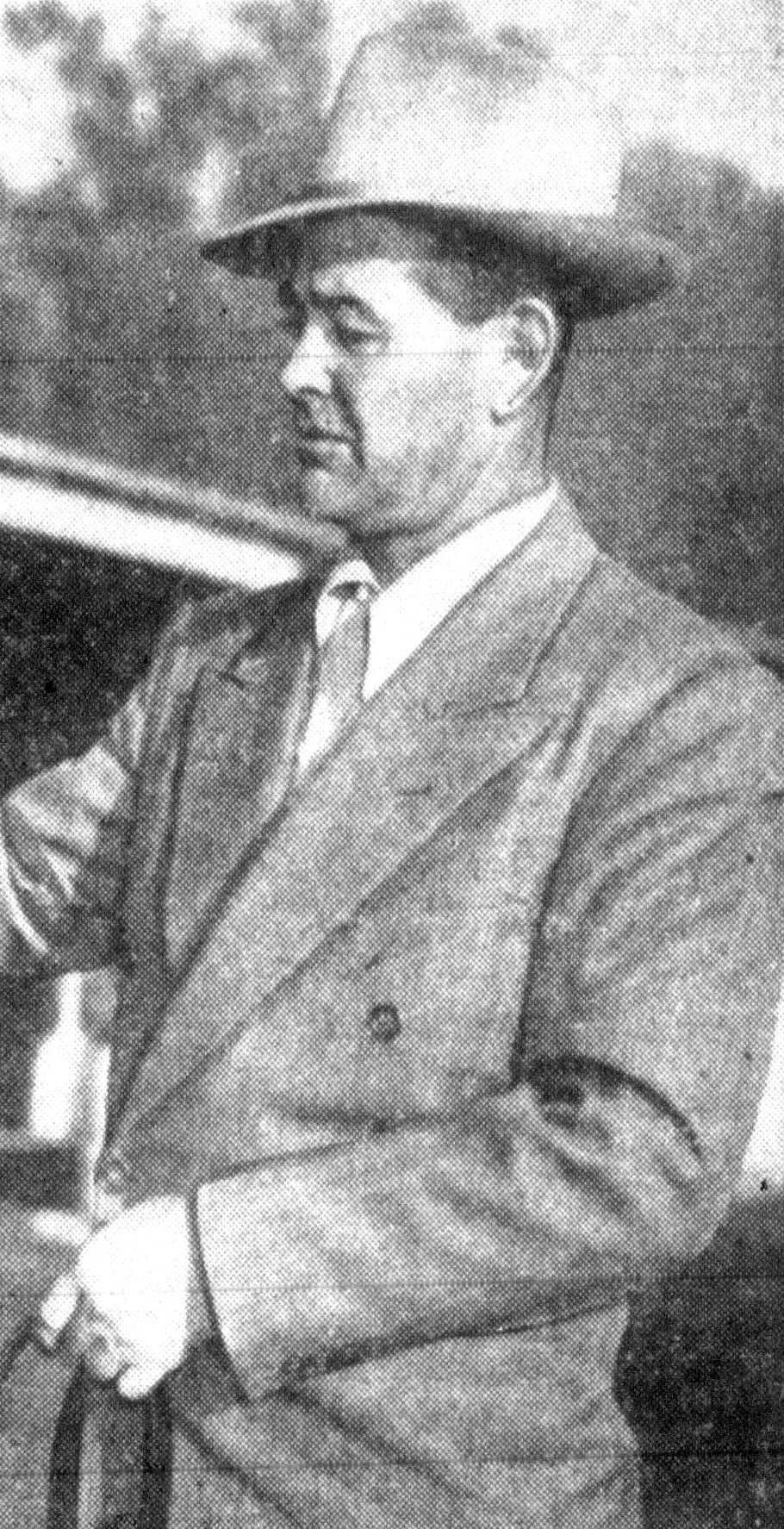
- Parke, circa 1950

Personal information
- Born: November 1, 1908 Albion, Idaho, United States
- Died: January 20, 1995 (aged 86) Gainesville, Florida
- Resting place: Declo Cemetery, Declo, Idaho
- Occupation: Jockey / Trainer

Horse racing career
- Sport: Horse racing
- Career wins: 419 (as a jockey)

Major racing wins
- As a jockey: Tulane Purse (1923); Breeders' Futurity Stakes (1923); Capitol Handicap (1923); New Orleans Handicap (1924); Blue and Gray Handicap (1924); Bowie Handicap (1924); Champlain Handicap (1924); Pimlico Cup Handicap (1924); Thanksgiving Handicap (1924); Piscataway Purse (1924); Tally-Ho Purse (1924); George Washington Handicap (1924); Ponce de Leon Handicap (1925); Wood Memorial Stakes (1925) As a trainer: Wood Memorial Stakes (1945, 1949, 1958); Breeders' Futurity Stakes (1946, 1948); Washington Park Futurity Stakes (1946, 1956, 1957); Derby Trial Stakes (1949); San Felipe Stakes (1949); Withers Stakes (1949, 1963); Paumonok Handicap (1950); Champagne Stakes (1957); Cowdin Stakes (1957); Tremont Stakes (1957); Laurel Futurity Stakes (1957); Marguerite Stakes (1965); New York Handicap (1966); Sanford Stakes (1967); Arlington Classic (1968) American Classic Race wins: Kentucky Derby (1945)

Racing awards
- United States Champion Jockey by wins (1923, 1924); United States Champion Jockey by earnings (1924)

Honors
- National Museum of Racing and Hall of Fame (1978)

Significant horses
- As a jockey: Altawood As a trainer: Exclusive Native, Hoop Jr., Jewel's Reward, Olympia

Ivan Harris Parke (November 1, 1908 – January 20, 1995) was an American Hall of Fame Thoroughbred horse racing jockey and trainer who won more races than any other jockey in the United States in 1923, as an apprentice, and again in 1924 when he also was the United States Champion Jockey by earnings. Parke trained the 1945 Kentucky Derby winner, Hoop Jr. and Jewel's Reward to 1957 American Champion Two-Year-Old Colt honors.

Ivan Parke and four of his brothers had careers in Thoroughbred horse racing. Burley Parke, a jockey and outstanding trainer was also inducted into the National Museum of Racing and Hall of Fame. Both Charles and Monte were successful in their own right.

== Career as a jockey ==
Ivan Parke began his career riding American Quarter Horses before switching to Thoroughbreds. On December 5, 1923, rode five straight winners at Jefferson Park Racetrack in New Orleans. Hired to ride for the major racing stable of Harry Payne Whitney in 1924, Parke rode in the Kentucky Derby for him in 1924 and 1925, finishing off the board on both occasions. As a jockey in 1925, Parke won the first race ever run at Hialeah Park in Florida. But, by August 1925 weight gain problems would force him off the saddle just three years after he started. However, he turned to riding steeplechase horses and in 1931 finished second in wins among all steeplechase jockeys in the United States.

== Career as a trainer ==
Ivan Parke began training Thoroughbreds in 1935 and during his trained twenty-seven stakes race winners for major owners including Fred W. Hooper, Ogden Phipps, Elizabeth Arden's Maine Chance Farm, and Louis Wolfson's Harbor View Farm. Besides winning the Kentucky Derby, among Parke's other accomplishments, he bred and trained Olympia, a colt with which he won the 1949 Wood Memorial Stakes. Olympia went on to become a very successful sire.

In 1957, while trainer for Maine Chance Farm, Ivan Parke conditioned Jewel's Reward to American Champion Two-Year-Old Colt honors.

Inducted into the National Museum of Racing and Hall of Fame in 1978 as a jockey, Ivan Parke was living in Alachua, Florida at the time of his death in 1995 at age eighty-six.
