= Arts and Letters =

American-bred Thoroughbred racehorse

- Sire: Ribot
- Grandsire: Tenerani
- Dam: All Beautiful
- Damsire: Battlefield
- Sex: Stallion
- Foaled: 1966
- Country: United States
- Colour: Chestnut
- Breeder: Paul Mellon
- Owner: Rokeby Stable
- Trainer: J. Elliott Burch
- Record: 23: 11-6-1
- Earnings: $632,404

Major wins
- Blue Grass Stakes (1969); Everglades Stakes (1969); Jim Dandy Stakes (1969); Travers Stakes (1969); Metropolitan Handicap (1969); Jockey Club Gold Cup (1969); Woodward Stakes (1969); Grey Lag Handicap (1970) Triple Crown race wins/placings: Belmont Stakes (1969); Kentucky Derby 2nd (1969); Preakness Stakes 2nd (1969)

Awards
- U.S. Champion 3-Yr-Old Colt (1969); DRF U.S. Champion Handicap Male Horse (1969); United States Horse of the Year (1969)

Honours
- United States Racing and Hall of Fame (1994) #67 - Top 100 U.S. Racehorses of the 20th Century

Arts and Letters (April 1, 1966 – October 16, 1998) was an American Hall of Fame Champion Thoroughbred racehorse.

== Background ==
Arts and Letters was a chestnut horse owned and bred by American sportsman and philanthropist Paul Mellon, and trained by future Hall of Famer Elliott Burch.

== Racing career ==
Arts and Letters began racing at age two. He won two of his six starts in 1968, then at age three won two important Kentucky Derby prep races before finishing second in both the Derby and the Preakness Stakes to the undefeated California colt Majestic Prince.

He carried the well-known colors of dark grey, yellow braids, sleeves, and cap. Arts and Letters came back to win the 1½ mile Belmont Stakes under jockey Braulio Baeza, after which second-place finisher Majestic Prince was retired due to injury. Arts and Letters went on to win several more important races in 1969. For 18 years, he ranked as only the third horse to win one U.S. Triple Crown race and finish second in the other two, joining Alsab (1942) and Sword Dancer (1959), and then followed by Bet Twice (1987), Easy Goer (1989), and Journalism (2025).

At age four, Arts and Letters won one of three races. His career ended after he suffered an injury in the Californian Stakes.

== Stud record ==
Standing at stud at Greentree Farm, he met with reasonable success. The most notable of his stakes winning offspring was Codex, who gave trainer D. Wayne Lukas his first win in the U.S. Triple Crown race by capturing the 1980 Preakness Stakes. Arts and Letters also sired other grade one winners like the gelding Winter's Tale, who won the Marlboro Cup H. (G1), Brooklyn H. (G1) and Suburban H. (G1) and the gelding Lord Darnley who won Gulfstream Park H. (G1) and Widener H. (G1) along with many other stakes winners. Arts and Letters was euthanized at the advanced age of 32 in 1998 due to the infirmities of old age (though this date is listed as 2000 with the Jockey Club). He was buried at Greentree Farm, which is now part of Gainesway Farm.

== Honors ==
Arts and Letters was voted three major awards in 1969, including the most prestigious: American Horse of the Year.

In 1994, Arts and Letters was inducted in the United States' National Museum of Racing and Hall of Fame.

== Sire line tree ==
- Arts and Letters
  - Winter's Tale
  - Codex
    - Badger Land
    - Lost Code
  - Lord Darnley
  - Tonzarun
