= As Indicated =

American-bred Thoroughbred racehorse

- Sire: Czaravich
- Grandsire: Nijinsky II
- Dam: Our Nice Sue
- Damsire: Our Michael
- Sex: Gelding
- Foaled: May 16, 1990
- Country: United States
- Colour: Chestnut
- Breeder: Margot I. Perkins
- Owner: Heatherwood Farm
- Trainer: Richard Schosberg
- Record: 15: 10-2-0
- Earnings: US$802,212

Major wins
- Sly Fox Stakes (1993); Gotham Stakes (1993); Happy Thanksgiving Stakes (1993); Aqueduct Handicap (1994); Assault Handicap (1994); Grey Lag Breeders' Cup Handicap (1994); Pimlico Special Handicap (1994)

As Indicated (foaled May 16, 1990) is an American Thoroughbred racehorse bred in Kentucky by Margot I. Perkins and raced under the Heatherwood Farm banner as his owner. He was sired by top stallion Czaravich, who was a son of Nijinsky. His dam was Our Nice Sue. He finished racing with a record of 10-2-0 in 15 starts with career earnings of $802,212. As Indicated was best known for his wins in the grade one Pimlico Special and the grade two Gotham Stakes.

== Three-year-old season ==
As a three-year-old, As Indicated won the Sly Fox Stakes in the winter. In April, he competed in the grade two Gotham Stakes at Aqueduct at a mile. As Indicated saved ground under jockey C. V. Bisono, circled the field midway around the far turn, and overtook leaders Itaka and Strolling Along down the stretch to win by two lengths.

Late in the spring, As Indicated had a minor injury that kept him out of the Triple Crown races in 1993. In June, he finished second in the grade three Woody Stephens Stakes. Late in the fall, he won the Happy Thanksgiving Stakes.

== Four-year-old season ==
At the beginning of his four-year-old season in 1994, As Indicated was on a winning streak when he left for Maryland. In the grade one Pimlico Special Handicap at "Old Hilltop" in Baltimore, Maryland, he broke slowly in a field of six against three grade-one stakes winners as the second favorite at 2-1 and second highweight at 120 lbs. Jockey Robbie Davis took a strong hold and rating him in fourth place. Around the club house turn and down the backstretch, As Indicated inched up from fourth place behind Devil His Due and Pistols and Roses. On the far turn, he challenged the leaders as four horses hit the top of the stretch together. At the sixteenth pole, he passed Pistols and Roses and drew away to beat defending champion Devil His Due by two and a half lengths. Valley Crossing rallied off the rail to finish third. As Indicated claimed $360,000 of the $600,000 purse in winning his sixth straight race.

Earlier in the year, As Indicated won three separate grade three races all at Aqueduct Racetrack: the Aqueduct Handicap, the Assault Handicap, and the Grey Lag Breeders' Cup Handicap with 127 lbs.

As Indicated raced once in 1995 and was retired in late 1996.
