= Bayou (horse) =

American-bred Thoroughbred racehorse

- Sire: Hill Prince
- Grandsire: Princequillo
- Dam: Bourtai
- Damsire: Stimulus
- Sex: Filly
- Foaled: 1954
- Country: United States
- Colour: Chestnut
- Breeder: Claiborne Farm
- Owner: Claiborne Farm
- Trainer: Moody Jolley
- Rider: Bill Hartack
- Record: 32: 7-8-4
- Earnings: US$143,759

Major wins
- Acorn Stakes (1957); Delaware Oaks (1957); Gazelle Handicap (1957); Maskette Handicap (1957)

Awards
- American Champion Three-Year-Old Filly (1957)

Bayou (1954–1982) was an American Thoroughbred racemare who was bred and raced by Bull Hancock's Claiborne Farm. and who was voted the American Champion Three-Year-Old Filly of 1957.

Bred in Kentucky, Bayou was sired by U.S. Racing Hall of Fame inductee Hill Prince and out of the mare, Bourtai. She was trained by Moody Jolley
