= Burley E. Parke =

American horse trainer

Burley Parke
Personal information
- Born: March 21, 1905 Albion, Idaho, United States
- Died: October 4, 1977 (aged 72); Burley, Idaho
- Resting place: Pleasant Hill Cemetery, Albion, Idaho
- Occupation: Jockey / Trainer

Horse racing career
- Sport: Horse racing

Major racing wins
- As a trainer: Arlington Matron Stakes (1942); Arlington Futurity Stakes (1942, 1943, 1944); Washington Park Futurity Stakes (1942, 1943, 1944); Belmont Futurity Stakes (1942, 1943); Breeders' Futurity Stakes (1942); Jerome Handicap (1944); Lincoln Handicap (1944, 1947); Discovery Handicap (1946, 1964, 1965); Hollywood Gold Cup (1950); San Juan Capistrano Handicap (1950); Santa Anita Handicap (1950); Bay Shore Stakes (1960); Champagne Stakes (1960, 1963); Dwyer Stakes (1960); Pimlico Futurity (1960); New York Stakes (1960); Wood Memorial Stakes (1960); Arcadia Handicap (1961); Edgemere Handicap (1961); Sheepshead Bay Stakes (1961); Ladies Handicap (1962); National Stallion Stakes (1962); Pucker Up Stakes (1962); Saranac Stakes (1962); Bed O' Roses Handicap (1963); Great American Stakes (1963); Juvenile Stakes (1963); Test Stakes (1963); American Derby (1964); Arlington Handicap (1964); Bahamas Stakes (1964, 1965); Jersey Derby (1964); Nassau County Handicap (1964); Tidal Handicap (1964); Jockey Club Gold Cup (1965); Manhattan Handicap (1965); Firenze Handicap (1965); Woodward Stakes (1965); Comely Stakes (1966); Distaff Handicap (1966)

Honours
- National Museum of Racing and Hall of Fame (1986)

Significant horses
- Noor, Occupation, Occupy, Raise a Native, Roman Brother

Burley Elijah Parke (March 21, 1905 – October 4, 1977) was an American jockey and a Hall of Fame trainer in the sport of Thoroughbred horse racing.

== Early life ==
Parke was born in Albion, Idaho, one of 12 children (eight boys and four girls) born to Anson and Julia Harris Parke. Anson was a stockman and rancher; he moved from Utah to Albion, Idaho and later to the nearby town of Declo. Anson raised many animals, including sheep and horses. Each year when the county fair opened, Anson took some of his horses to the races. Although he would ride, as his sons became old enough and had sufficient skills they took their turns at riding the horses. They won many races, and the boys' small stature and experience soon caught the attention of those racing in the Nevada and California circuits.

== Career ==
Burley and four of his brothers found careers in Thoroughbred racing, all of them beginning as jockeys. Vosco was the first to leave home, followed by Burley. Burley raced in Reno, Nevada and then at California's Santa Anita Park and at Tijuana. He was successful (the second leading rider in the country in 1921), but after several seasons he became too heavy to ride. Parke became a jockey's agent, and then an assistant trainer. His brothers, Ivan, Charles, and Monte, were also successful in their own right. Ivan was the nation's leading jockey in 1923 and 1924, and won the first race ever run at Hialeah Park in Florida. Like Burley, Ivan too was elected to the U.S. Racing Hall of Fame. Monte was the nation's second leading rider in 1933. As a trainer, Monte won the 1960 Arkansas Derby.

After losing his battle with weight gain, Burley Parke worked for a time as an assistant to Hall of Fame trainer, Preston M. Burch. He embarked on a career as a trainer in 1927, channeling his natural skills and knowledge of horses into their race conditioning. From 1942-1944, while training for John Marsch (a retired railroad contractor and one of America's richest men at the time), he won nine Futurity Stakes, capturing the Arlington, Belmont, Breeders', and Washington Futuritys. This gave him the nickname "the Futurity Man" in racing and media circles. Two of his favorite horses were the full brothers Occupation and Occupy (by Bull Dog out of Miss Bunting), who had won the Washington Park Futurity Stakes in successive years, with Occupation defeating the legendary Count Fleet twice as a two-year-old.

Charles S. Howard, who owned Seabiscuit, hired Parke to run his racing stable during the late 1940s. At that time, Howard bought the Hall of Fame horse Noor from the Aga Khan and brought him to America. Parke saw a horse with great promise, but who was stubborn and ill-tempered. Having raced in Europe, the American tracks and style of racing were unfamiliar to Noor. Parke used his skill and patience to teach Noor to use his speed; he became one of the great horses of American racing, defeating Citation four times. This was the highlight of Parke’s career.

Noor was retired after winning the Hollywood Gold Cup in December 1950. Burley also retired, and turned his attention to his 55-acre (220,000 m^{2}) fruit ranch in Santa Rosa, California. He remained there until 1959 when, at the recommendation of Burley's brother Ivan, Louis Wolfson convinced Burley to return to training. Steve Wolfson, son of Louis, wrote in an April 24, 2004 article in Thoroughbred Times that: "It took Dad's strong persuasion and a huge $100,000-guaranteed salary to coax the master horseman out of retirement to take over the reins of Harbor View Farm in 1959. The sum was especially significant when realizing the standard trainer's fee, 10%, would only have been $8,000 based on the fledgling stable's first full year of operation in 1959, when its horses earned a total of $80,161."

Wolfson put Parke in charge of his Harbor View Farm horses stabled at Belmont, Saratoga and Hialeah, with strings also racing in Chicago and New Orleans. With Harbor View Farm stable Parke trained many notable horses, including, Roving Minstrel, Wolfram, Raise a Native (a noted sire and the 1963 American Co-Champion Two-Year-Old Colt), whom he called the fastest two-year he ever trained, and Roman Brother (American Champion Older Male Horse and co-Horse of the Year in 1965).

== Personal life ==
Parke was a soft-spoken man, who was reserved and polite. In his private life he had a good sense of humor and enjoyed practical jokes. He was respected by his peers, racing fans and his family. Burley married Marion L. Eddy; they had a daughter, Virginia M. Parke. He later divorced Marion and married Dorothy Anderson Bosley, a single mother of five whom he met on a visit home to Declo. He took on Dorothy's young family, fathering four children with her: Marlyce, Marvin, Gary and Eldon. He was a good father who spent considerable time with his children.

Parke ranked among America's top-five trainers for seven years. Having made his contribution to American thoroughbred racing he retired in 1967 and moved with his family to Phoenix, Arizona, spending summers in his beloved Idaho. His passion was the outdoors; he enjoyed fishing, camping and gardening. Parke died of a heart attack in Burley, Idaho October 4, 1977; he is buried in Albion, Idaho.
