= Wagon Limit =

American thoroughbred racehorse

- Sire: Conquistador Cielo
- Grandsire: Mr. Prospector
- Dam: Darlin Lindy
- Damsire: Cox's Ridge
- Sex: Stallion
- Foaled: 1994
- Country: USA
- Breeder: Joseph V. Shields Jr.
- Owner: Joseph V. Shields Jr.
- Trainer: H. Allen Jerkens
- Earnings: $992,660

Major wins
- Jockey Club Gold Cup (1998); Westchester Handicap (1998)

Wagon Limit (foaled May 16, 1994) is an American Thoroughbred racehorse who won the 1998 Jockey Club Gold Cup.

== Career ==
Wagon Limit's first race was on February 22, 1997, where he came in 2nd place. On April 3, 1997, he captured his first win at Aqueduct Racetrack.

On April 4, 1998, he won the 1998 Westchester Handicap, his first graded race.

On October 10, 1998, in the final race of his career, he captured the Grade 1 Jockey Club Gold Cup.

== Stud career ==
Wagon Limit's descendants include:

c = colt, f = filly

Foaled	Name	Sex	Major Wins
2001	Silver Wagon	c	Carter Handicap, General George Handicap, Hopeful Stakes
2010	Delta Bluesman	c	Smile Sprint Stakes

== Pedigree ==
Pedigree of Wagon Limit (USA),1994
Sire Conquistador Cielo (USA) b. 1979	Mr. Prospector (USA) b. 1970	Raise a Native	Native Dancer
Sire Conquistador Cielo (USA) b. 1979	Mr. Prospector (USA) b. 1970	Raise a Native	Raise You
Sire Conquistador Cielo (USA) b. 1979	Mr. Prospector (USA) b. 1970	Gold Digger	Nashua
Sire Conquistador Cielo (USA) b. 1979	Mr. Prospector (USA) b. 1970	Gold Digger	Sequence
Sire Conquistador Cielo (USA) b. 1979	K D Princess (USA) b. 1971	Bold Commander	Bold Ruler
Sire Conquistador Cielo (USA) b. 1979	K D Princess (USA) b. 1971	Bold Commander	High Voltage
Sire Conquistador Cielo (USA) b. 1979	K D Princess (USA) b. 1971	Tammy's Turn	Turn-to
Sire Conquistador Cielo (USA) b. 1979	K D Princess (USA) b. 1971	Tammy's Turn	Timmy Twist
Dam Darlin Lindy (USA) b. 1986	Cox's Ridge (USA) b. 1974	Best Turn	Turn-to
Dam Darlin Lindy (USA) b. 1986	Cox's Ridge (USA) b. 1974	Best Turn	Sweet Clementine
Dam Darlin Lindy (USA) b. 1986	Cox's Ridge (USA) b. 1974	Our Martha	Ballydonnell
Dam Darlin Lindy (USA) b. 1986	Cox's Ridge (USA) b. 1974	Our Martha	Corday
Dam Darlin Lindy (USA) b. 1986	Smart Darlin (USA) b. 1982	Alydar	Raise a Native
Dam Darlin Lindy (USA) b. 1986	Smart Darlin (USA) b. 1982	Alydar	Sweet Tooth
Dam Darlin Lindy (USA) b. 1986	Smart Darlin (USA) b. 1982	Smartaire	Ouibu
Dam Darlin Lindy (USA) b. 1986	Smart Darlin (USA) b. 1982	Smartaire	Art Teacher
