= Pet Bully =

American-bred Thoroughbred racehorse

- Sire: Petrose
- Grandsire: Peter Hastings
- Dam: Camelina
- Damsire: Bull Dog
- Sex: Stallion
- Foaled: 1948
- Country: United States
- Colour: Bay
- Breeder: Danada Farm
- Owner: Ada L. Rice
- Trainer: Howard Hoffman; Thomas J. Kelly (1954)
- Rider: Bill Hartack
- Record: 47: 23-4-6
- Earnings: US$365,702

Major wins
- Washington's Birthday Handicap (1952) Hollywood Premiere Handicap (1953); Inglewood Handicap (1953), Lakes And Flowers H.andicap (1953); Phoenix Handicap (1953); Washington Park Handicap (1954); Woodward Mile (1954); Valley Forge Handicap (1954); Fall Highweight Handicap (1954); Princeton Handicap (1954); Wilmington Handicap (1954)

Pet Bully (1948–1971) was an American Thoroughbred racehorse who was the first top quality horse that U.S. Racing Hall of Fame jockey Bill Hartack ever rode and who won the inaugural running of the prestigious Woodward Stakes.

== Background ==
Bred by Dan and Ada Rice at their Danada Farm on Old Frankfort Pike near Lexington, Kentucky, Pet Bully raced under Mrs. Rice's name. He was trained by Howard Hoffman,

== Racing career ==
Pet Bully raced at age two but broke a bone in his foot which led to him missing his entire three-year-old season. At four, he returned to the track, winning eight of sixteen starts, most notably the Washington's Birthday Handicap at Santa Anita Park in California.

Racing in California in 1953, Bill Shoemaker won three major races aboard Pet Bully at Hollywood Park Racetrack. They captured the Hollywood Premiere Handicap, Inglewood Handicap and the Lakes And Flowers Handicap.

Although the media spotlight in 1954 was on Native Dancer, six-year-old Pet Bully ranked as one of the top horses competing in the United States. That year Tommy Kelly took over as head trainer of the Chicago-based Rice stable and designated a promising young jockey named Bill Hartack as the rider for Pet Bully. They won top handicap races in Chicago and New York, including the inaugural running of the then one mile Woodward Stakes, and set a new Bowie Race Track track record for 5½ furlongs of 1:03. 2/5.

== Stud record ==
Retired to stud duty, Pet Bully met with modest success as a sire.
