= Moody Jolley =

American horse trainer

Personal information
- Born: March 23, 1910 Tennessee
- Died: February 4, 1976 (aged 65)
- Occupation: Trainer

Horse racing career
- Sport: Horse racing

Major racing wins
- Trainer: Acorn Stakes (1950, 1957); Monmouth Breeders' Cup Oaks (1950); Champagne Stakes (1951); Peter Pan Stakes (1952); Arlington-Washington Lassie Stakes (1954, 1955); Alcibiades Stakes (1955); National Stallion Stakes (filly division) (1955); Arlington Matron Stakes (1956); Ashland Stakes (1956); Lafayette Stakes (1956, 1958); Spinster Stakes (1956); Breeders' Futurity Stakes (1956); Phoenix Handicap (1957); American Derby (1958, 1959); Arlington Classic (1959); Stars and Stripes Turf Handicap (1960) Owner: Arlington-Washington Lassie Stakes (1961); Arlington-Washington Futurity Stakes (1962); Blue Grass Stakes (1962); Nashua Stakes (1976); Whitney Handicap (1976)

Significant horses
- Bayou, Dark Star, Doubledogdare, Nadir, Nearly On Time, Ridan, Round Table

Moody S. Jolley (March 23, 1910 – February 4, 1976) was an American thoroughbred horse racing owner, breeder and trainer. His son, LeRoy, trained Ridan and other horses owned by the family.

== Career ==
He began his professional training career in the mid-1930s and by 1940 had his first Kentucky Derby runner. For several years, he trained for Harry Guggenheim's Cain Hoy Stable. After their partnership ended in November 1952. Jolley would soon join Bull Hancock's renowned Claiborne Farm where he conditioned the great Round Table before the colt was sold.

Six horses trained by Moody Jolley ran in the American Classics with his best result a sixth in the 1951 Kentucky Derby, a third in the 1959 Preakness Stakes and a third in the 1951 Belmont Stakes.

The most famous horse Moody Jolley and his wife owned was Ridan, a strong-headed colt purchased as a yearling and owned in partnership with Ernest Woods and John L. Greer. In 1962 Ridan won the Florida Derby and Blue Grass Stakes and equaled the world record for five furlongs in a near effortless early-morning workout. The Jolleys also owned multiple Graded stakes race winner Nearly On Time whose wins included the 1976 Whitney Handicap.

== Death and legacy ==
Moody Jolley was living in Hialeah, Florida at the time of his death in 1976. LeRoy Jolley trained for other owners and was inducted in the U.S. Racing Hall of Fame in 1987.
