= Thomas Joseph Kelly =

American racehorse trainer

Tommy Kelly
Personal information
- Born: September 23, 1919 Pikesville, Maryland, United States
- Died: April 19, 2013 (aged 93) Miami, Florida, U.S.
- Resting place: Our Lady of Mercy Catholic Cemetery; Miami, Florida, U.S.
- Occupation: Trainer

Horse racing career
- Sport: Horse racing
- Career wins: Not found

Major racing wins
- Marguerite Stakes (1954); Fashion Stakes (1955, 1958); Arlington Classic (1961, 1972); Juvenile Stakes (1961); Saranac Stakes (1961, 1992); Wood Memorial Stakes (1961, 1980); Westchester Handicap (1962, 1963, 1965, 1977); Youthful Stakes (1962,1976); Sheepshead Bay Handicap (1965, 1972, 1975); Red Smith Handicap (1967, 1977); National Stallion Stakes (filly division) (1969); Champagne Stakes (1970); Laurel Futurity Stakes (1970, 1979); American Derby (1972); Canadian International Stakes (1972); Hawthorne Gold Cup Handicap (1972); Massachusetts Handicap (1972); Round Table Handicap (1972); Test Stakes (1972, 1986); Washington, D.C. International Stakes (1972); Bernard Baruch Handicap (1975); Manhattan Handicap (1975); Monmouth Breeders' Cup Oaks (1977); Spinaway Stakes (1977); United Nations Stakes (1978, 1979); Remsen Stakes (1979); Bed O' Roses Breeders' Cup Handicap (1980); Distaff Handicap (1980); Florida Derby (1980); Jamaica Handicap (1980); Jim Dandy Stakes (1980); Hempstead Handicap (1980); Vosburgh Stakes (1980)

Honours
- National Museum of Racing and Hall of Fame (1993)

Significant horses
- Droll Role, King's Bishop, Lavender Hill, Misty Gallore, Noble Dancer, Pet Bully, Plugged Nickle

Thomas Joseph Kelly (September 23, 1919 – April 19, 2013) was a United States Racing Hall of Fame trainer of Thoroughbred racehorses as well as an owner and breeder.

Born in Pikesville, Maryland, in his teens he began working at the Baltimore racetrack, as did his younger brother, Eddie. His learning of the business from the bottom up was interrupted by service with the United States military during World War II in which he received two Purple Hearts. Following his discharge, Kelly returned to Thoroughbred racing and obtained his trainer's license in 1945. From then until his retirement from training fifty-four years later in 1998, Kelly won numerous important races and conditioned sixty-five stakes race winners. He trained several very successful horses for owner John M. Schiff including Plugged Nickle, the 1980 American Champion Sprint Horse, and Droll Role, a top runner on both dirt and grass and a winner of the 1972 Canadian International Stakes at Woodbine Racetrack in Canada and the Washington, D.C. International Stakes at the Laurel Park Racecourse in his native Maryland.

Widely respected in the industry, in 1954, as the new head trainer for the racing stable of Dan and Ada Rice, Kelly saw the potential in a young jockey named Bill Hartack and purchased his contract from a West Virginia-based trainer. The two met with immediate success with a six-year-old horse named Pet Bully. Hartack developed into one of the top riders in the sport and went on to a Hall of Fame career.

In 1998, Kelly's final year as a trainer, a colt he had bred in partnership with Joseph and Mary Grant was foaled in Kentucky. Named Evening Attire, he was trained by Kelly's son, Patrick. The Kellys and their partners sent the horse to the track in 2001 and as of 2008 Evening Attire had earned almost $3 million. His July victory in track record time in the 1½ mile Greenwood Cup Stakes at Philadelphia Park Racetrack qualified him to compete in the 2008 Breeders' Cup Dirt Marathon.

A resident of Miami Springs, Florida, Kelly and his wife Francis had four sons and two daughters. Three of their sons are involved in the horse racing industry.

In 1993, Kelly was inducted in the National Museum of Racing and Hall of Fame at Saratoga Springs, New York.

He died in 2013 at a rehabilitation center in Miami. He was buried in Our Lady of Mercy Catholic Cemetery in Miami.
