= Plugged Nickle =

American-bred Thoroughbred racehorse

- Sire: Key To The Mint
- Grandsire: Graustark
- Dam: Toll Booth
- Damsire: Buckpasser
- Sex: Stallion
- Foaled: March 1, 1977
- Country: United States
- Colour: Bay
- Breeder: John M. Schiff
- Owner: John M. Schiff
- Trainer: Thomas J. Kelly
- Record: 21: 11-3-1
- Earnings: $647,206

Major wins
- Laurel Futurity (1979); Remsen Stakes (1979); Hutcheson Stakes (1980); Florida Derby (1980); Wood Memorial Stakes (1980); Vosburgh Stakes (1980); Stuyvesant Handicap (1980); Jim Dandy Stakes (1980); Tom Fool Handicap (1980)

Awards
- American Champion Sprint Horse (1980)
- Last updated on September 4, 2008

Plugged Nickle (March 1, 1977 – 1997 in Kentucky) was an American Thoroughbred racehorse. He was voted American Champion Sprint Horse in 1980.

== Background ==
Bred and raced by John M. Schiff, he was trained by future U.S. Racing Hall of Fame inductee Tommy Kelly.

== Racing career ==
At age two in 1979, Plugged Nickle won the Laurel Futurity and Remsen Stakes. In 1980, his wins in the Hutcheson Stakes, Florida Derby, and Wood Memorial made him the second choice among bettors behind favorite Rockhill Native in the 1¼ mile Kentucky Derby, the first leg of the U.S. Triple Crown series. The favorite finished fifth and Plugged Nickle, who raced near the lead until tiring in the homestretch, was seventh behind the winning filly, Genuine Risk.

Plugged Nickle did not run in the Preakness or Belmont Stakes but was switched to run in shorter sprint races. The move saw him win several more important Graded stakes races and be voted the 1980 Eclipse Award as American Champion Sprint Horse.

== Stud record ==
After his retirement to stud duty, Plugged Nickle's first crop of foals were born in 1983. He stood in the United States until age eleven when he was sent to breeders in South Africa. His modestly successful offspring includes twenty stakes winners.
