= Doubledogdare =

American-bred Thoroughbred racehorse

- Sire: Double Jay
- Grandsire: Balladier
- Dam: Flaming Top
- Damsire: Omaha
- Sex: mare
- Foaled: 1953
- Country: United States
- Colour: Bay
- Breeder: Claiborne Farm
- Owner: Claiborne Farm
- Trainer: Moody Jolley
- Record: 25: 13-6-1
- Earnings: US$258,206

Major wins
- Alcibiades Stakes (1955); Colleen Stakes (1955); Matron Stakes (1955); National Stallion Stakes (filly division) (1955); Ashland Stakes (1956); Coronet Stakes (1956); Falls City Handicap (1956); Oaks Prep (1956); Spinster Stakes (1956)

Awards
- TSD & DRF American Champion Two-Year-Old Filly (1955); American Champion Three-Year-Old Filly (1956)

Honours
- Doubledogdare Stakes at Keeneland Race Course (1992– )
- Last updated on 14 April 2021

Doubledogdare (1953–1974) was an American Thoroughbred Champion racehorse. Bred and raced by the renowned Claiborne Farm of Bull Hancock, she was sired by Double Jay, the American Champion Two-Year-Old Colt of 1946 and a four-time Leading broodmare sire in North America. Her dam was Flaming Top, a daughter of 1935 U.S. Triple Crown champion Omaha.

Conditioned for racing by Moody Jolley, at age two Doubledogdare earned important wins including the 1955 Matron Stakes under future U.S. Racing Hall of Fame inductee Eric Guerin and the 1955 National Stallion Stakes, Fillies Division when ridden by another future Hall of Fame jockey, Jack Westrope. Doubledogdare's 1955 performances saw her win six of ten starts and finish second twice, earning $127,689. She was voted American Champion Two-Year-Old Filly by Daily Racing Form and Turf & Sports Digest magazine. Nasrina won the rival Thoroughbred Racing Association award.

Racing at age three, Doubledogdare won the Oaks Prep defeating Princess Turia as the 2/5 odds on favorite. and then ran second by a neck in the Kentucky Oaks when Princess Turia turned the tables. Among her other important wins in 1956 were the Ashland and Spinster Stakes, helping give her the American Champion Three-Year-Old Filly title.

Retired to broodmare duty, Doubledogdare produced foals that met with very little success in racing.
