= James W. Smith (horse trainer) =

American Thoroughbred horse trainer (1908–1969)

Personal information
- Born: September 11, 1908 Whitewater, Colorado, U.S.
- Died: February 2, 1969 (aged 60) Phoenix, Arizona, U.S.
- Occupation: Trainer

Horse racing career
- Sport: Horse racing
- Career wins: Not found

Major racing wins
- Arlington Classic (1940); Grand Union Hotel Stakes (1943,1946); Hopeful Stakes (1943,1946); American Derby (1944); Shevlin Stakes (1944); Dwyer Stakes (1944); Adirondack Stakes (1944); Matron Stakes (1944, 1948); Selima Stakes (1944); Travers Stakes (1944, 1948); Lawrence Realization Stakes (1944, 1948); Derby Trial Stakes (1945); Cowdin Stakes (1945); Blue Grass Stakes (1946); Gazelle Stakes (1946); Beldame Handicap (1946); Frizette Stakes (1946); Roamer Handicap (1946); Delaware Handicap (1946); Santa Anita Derby (1946); Colonial Handicap (1946); New Rochelle Handicap (1947); National Stallion Stakes (1948); Spinaway Stakes (1948); Test Stakes (1959); Bougainvillea Handicap (1959); Donn Handicap (1961, 1962); Gulfstream Park Handicap (1962); Molly Pitcher Handicap (1961); Arlington Matron Handicap (1961); Pan American Handicap (1962); Maskette Handicap (1962)

Significant horses
- Bee Mac, By Jimminy, Blue Border, Burning Dream, But Why Not, Lord Boswell, Ace Admiral, Busher, Knockdown, Bimlette, Beaugay, Myrtle Charm, Jay Fox, Shirley Jones, General Arthur
- Updated on June 10, 2008

James William Smith (September 11, 1908 – February 2, 1969) was an American Thoroughbred horse trainer. He was the son of Tom Smith, trainer of Seabiscuit.

James Smith trained for automotive industrialist Charles T. Fisher and won the 1940 Arlington Classic with Fisher's colt, Sirocco. A few years later he trained for the renowned owner of Idle Hour Stock Farm, Edward R. Bradley, for whom he earlier rode as a jockey, riding and winning on such stars of the turf Black Helen at 2 and Blue Larkspur at 4, among others.

Along with his father, James Smith trained for Maine Chance Farm. On February 15, 1949, James W. Smith trained his last horse for Maine Chance Farm, winning the feature race at Florida's Hialeah Park Race Track with Royal Blood. In 1946 he had three horses in the Kentucky Derby, the best finish a fourth place with Lord Boswell. James Smith's last Derby entrant was in 1961 with Jay Fox. James trained Champions Busher, By Jimminy, Bridal Flower, Myrtle Charm. He also trained Champions But Why Not (SW), Star Pilot (SW), note link takes you to non thoroughbred related content and Beaugay (multiple SW).

James W. Smith died in Phoenix, Arizona on February 2, 1969, at the age of 60.

== Sources ==
- Tom and James Smith at the Washington Racing Hall of Fame
