= Droll Role =

American-bred Thoroughbred racehorse

- Sire: Tom Rolfe
- Grandsire: Ribot
- Dam: Pradella
- Damsire: Preciptic
- Sex: Stallion
- Foaled: 1968
- Country: United States
- Colour: Dark Bay
- Breeder: John M. Schiff
- Owner: John M. Schiff
- Trainer: Thomas J. Kelly
- Record: 36: 10-8-6
- Earnings: $545,497

Major wins
- Grey Lag Handicap (1972); Hawthorne Gold Cup Handicap (1972); Tidal Handicap (1972); Massachusetts Handicap (1972); Canadian International Stakes (1972); Washington, D.C. International Stakes (1972)

Honours
- Droll Role Handicap at Laurel Park

Droll Role (foaled 1968 in Kentucky) was an American Thoroughbred racehorse. He is best known for a series of wins in major North American turf races in 1972, including the Canadian International Stakes and the Washington, D.C. International Stakes

== Background ==
Droll Role was owned and bred by John M. Schiff. His sire was the U.S. Racing Hall of Fame inductee Tom Rolfe, a son of the undefeated European superstar Ribot. His dam was Pradella, whose damsire was Nearco, another undefeated European star and one of the most influential sires of the 20th century. Droll Role was trained by future U.S. Racing Hall of Fame inductee Thomas J. Kelly.

== Racing career ==
Droll Role's best performance in a major race at age two was a second-place finish in the 1970 Pimlico-Laurel Futurity. At age three, he had three second-place finishes in graded stakes races without a win.

At age four, Droll Role developed into one of the top older horses in North America, winning on both dirt and turf. He ran third in the 1972 Man o' War Stakes, second in the Manhattan Handicap, and second to Quack in world-record time in the mile and a quarter Hollywood Gold Cup. Among his wins, Droll Role captured the Tidal Handicap in course-record time, the Grey Lag Handicap, and the Hawthorne Gold Cup Handicap, the Massachusetts Handicap. He also defeated Hall of Fame filly Belle Geste in the Canadian International Stakes at Woodbine Racetrack, which earned him an invitation to compete in the prestigious Washington, D.C. International Stakes at Laurel Park Racecourse. In that race, Droll Role earned the most important win of his career, defeating Riva Ridge plus some of the best runners from Europe, including that year's Prix de l'Arc de Triomphe winner, San San.

== Stud record ==
Droll Role retired to stud duty in 1973, and his offspring met with modest racing success. He was the damsire of Paristo, who won the 1981 Illinois and Tampa Bay Derbys and was third in the 1981 Preakness Stakes. In 1980, Droll Role was sent to a breeding operation in Italy, where his last foal was born in 1987.
