= Tom Smith (horse trainer) =

American Thoroughbred racehorse trainer of Seabiscuit

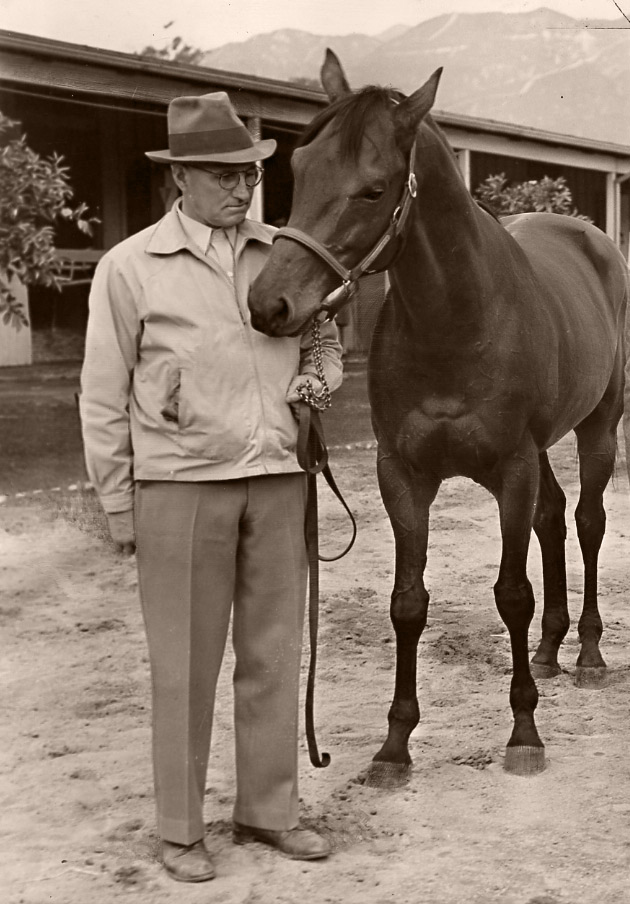
- Tom Smith with Seabiscuit

Personal information
- Born: May 20, 1878 Georgia, U.S.
- Died: January 23, 1957 (aged 78)
- Occupations: Trainer, Farrier

Horse racing career
- Sport: Horse racing
- Career wins: Not found

Major racing wins
- Bay Meadows Handicap (1937, 1938); Brooklyn Handicap (1937); Butler Handicap (1937); Massachusetts Handicap (1937); Agua Caliente Handicap (1938); Havre de Grace Handicap (1938); Hollywood Gold Cup (1938, 1939); Pimlico Special Match Race (1938); Santa Anita Handicap (1939, 1940); American Derby (1940); Potomac Handicap (1940); Chesapeake Stakes (1941); Santa Anita Derby (1941); Arlington-Washington Lassie Stakes (1945); Beldame Stakes (1945); Belmont Futurity Stakes (1945); Fashion Stakes (1945); Hopeful Stakes (1945); Juvenile Stakes (1945); Matron Stakes (1945); Walden Stakes (1945); Tremont Stakes (1946); Jamaica Handicap (1947); Great American Stakes (1950) American Classic Race wins: Kentucky Derby (1947)

Racing awards
- U.S. Champion Thoroughbred Trainer by earnings (1940, 1945)

Honours
- National Museum of Racing and Hall of Fame (2001); Washington Racing Hall of Fame (2003)

Significant horses
- Kayak II, Seabiscuit, Beaugay, Star Pilot, Jet Pilot
- Updated on August 20, 2008

Robert Thomas Smith (May 20, 1878 – January 23, 1957) was an American Thoroughbred racehorse trainer. Born in a log cabin in the backwoods of northwest Georgia, as a young man he trained horses for the United States Cavalry and worked on a cattle ranch. In 1934, he was hired as a trainer by the wealthy businessman Charles S. Howard.

Known as "Silent Tom" because of his quiet nature, Smith became famous as the trainer of Seabiscuit. In the 1940s, he was hired to train for Maine Chance Farm, owned by cosmetics tycoon Elizabeth Arden. Twice he was the U.S. Champion Trainer by earnings: first in 1940, and again in 1945.

On November 8, 1945, Smith was suspended from racing for a year by The Jockey Club after being found responsible for administering the stimulant ephedrine via an atomizer to one of his horses. The drug was given to the horse by the stable foreman without Smith's specific authorization, but under New York racing rules he was held responsible as the horse's trainer.

In his absence, Roy Waldron trained for a time for Maine Chance Farm, winning the Pimlico Futurity with Star Pilot, before Smith's 36-year-old son, Jimmy, took over for the remainder of the suspension.

When his suspension was over, Smith returned to Maine Chance Farm, where he trained 1947 Kentucky Derby winner Jet Pilot.

Smith retired from racing in 1955, having trained 29 graded stakes race winners. He died two years later in Glendale, California, and was buried there in the Forest Lawn Memorial Park in Sunrise Slope, Lot 6121, Space 4.

In 2000, Smith was elected to the National Museum of Racing and Hall of Fame and was inducted in 2001. According to author Laura Hillenbrand, Smith's election to the Hall of Fame was delayed because of Smith's allegedly using an illegal stimulant in 1945. His life's story was told by author Laura Hillenbrand's bestselling 2001 book Seabiscuit: An American Legend.

Smith was played by Academy Award-winning actor Chris Cooper in the 2003 film Seabiscuit.
