= New Rochelle Handicap =

- Class: Discontinued stakes
- Location: Morris Park 1893-1904; Belmont Park 1905-1910, 1923; Empire City 1918-1922, 1924-1942; Jamaica 1943-
- Inaugurated: 1899
- Race type: Thoroughbred - Flat racing

Race information
- Distance: 6 furlongs (3/4 mile)
- Surface: Dirt
- Track: Left-handed
- Qualification: Three-year-olds & up

The New Rochelle Handicap was an American Thoroughbred horse race first run at a distance of seven furlongs on dirt in 1899 at Morris Park Racecourse in The Bronx. When that racetrack closed in 1904 the race was transferred to Belmont Park in Elmont, New York where it remained through 1910 until further restrictions were added to the Hart–Agnew Law by the New York Legislature that ended all racing in New York State. Although racing returned in 1913, the New Rochelle Handicap was not run again until 1918 when the Empire Racing Association revived it at its Empire City Race Track in Yonkers, New York. The 1923 race was transferred to Belmont Park. In 1943, the race was moved to the Empire Racing Association's Jamaica Race Course in Jamaica, New York which closed on August 2, 1959.

In its final decade, the New Rochelle Handicap was contested at a distance of six furlongs.

== Locations ==
1893-1904: Morris Park
1905-1910, 1923: Belmont Park
1918-1922, 1924-1942: Empire City
1943- end: Jamaica

== Historical notes ==
- In winning the 1908 edition of the New Rochelle Handicap aboard James R. Keene's colt, jockey Joe Notter rode Restigouche to a new world record time for 7 1/2 furlongs on dirt.
- In 1918, Preakness Stakes winner War Cloud won the New Rochelle Handicap at a distance of one mile in the first year it was run at the Empire City Race Track.
