= Braulio Baeza =

American jockey

Personal information
- Born: March 26, 1940 (age 86) Panama City, Panama
- Occupation: Jockey

Horse racing career
- Sport: Horse racing
- Career wins: 4,013

Major racing wins
- Kentucky Oaks (1961, 1976); Blue Grass Stakes (1961, 1963, 1976); Fashion Stakes (1962, 1964, 1971, 1972); Gardenia Stakes (1962, 1971); Juvenile Stakes (1962, 1968, 1972); National Stallion Stakes (filly division) (1962, 1964); Wood Memorial Stakes (1962); Stymie Handicap (1963); National Stallion Stakes (1964, 1965, 1966); Jockey Club Gold Cup (1965, 1966, 1969); Travers Stakes (1966, 1969, 1972, 1975); Whitney Handicap (1968, 1972); Washington, D.C. International (1972); Canadian International Stakes (1972); Hawthorne Gold Cup Handicap (1967, 1973) U.S. Triple Crown wins Kentucky Derby (1963); Belmont Stakes (1961, 1963, 1969) International race wins: Benson & Hedges Gold Cup (1972)

Racing awards
- George Woolf Memorial Jockey Award (1968); U.S. Champion Jockey in earnings (1965, 1966, 1967, 1968, 1969); Eclipse Award for Outstanding Jockey (1972, 1975)

Honours
- United States Racing Hall of Fame (1976)

Significant horses
- Buckpasser, Graustark, Dr. Fager, Ack Ack; Chateaugay, Arts and Letters, Droll Role; Roberto, Foolish Pleasure
- Updated on January 29, 2007

Braulio Baeza (born March 26, 1940) is a Panamanian-American thoroughbred horse racing jockey. In 1963, he was the first Latin American jockey to win the Kentucky Derby.

== Biography ==
Baeza began his racing career in 1955 in Panama at Hipodromo Juan Franco, and in March 1960, was invited to Miami, Florida to ride under contract for Owner/Trainer, Fred Hooper. He rode his first race in the US in the first race on Keeneland's opening day, 1960, and won it on Foolish Youth.

=== 1960s ===
Braulio Baeza's success in America was instantaneous. He was the leading money winner in American racing from 1965 to 1969, the 1968 winner of the George Woolf Memorial Jockey Award, and the 1972 and 1975 winner of the Eclipse Award for Outstanding Jockey. During his career, he rode a number of Thoroughbred greats, including Buckpasser, Graustark, Dr. Fager, and Ack Ack. In 1961, he won his first Belmont Stakes. Two years later, he rode to his first Kentucky Derby victory on Chateaugay, as well as for his second Belmont Stakes win. In 1969, he won the Belmont for the third time, denying Majestic Prince the Triple Crown, on board Paul Mellon's future Hall of Famer, Arts and Letters.

=== 1970s ===
In 1972, Baeza travelled to York Racecourse in England, where he rode John Galbraith's Roberto to victory over the previously unbeaten Brigadier Gerard in the inaugural Benson & Hedges Gold Cup. That same year, he went to Woodbine Racetrack in Toronto, Ontario, Canada, where he won the prestigious Canadian International Stakes on Droll Role for trainer T. J. Kelly. Baeza was the jockey aboard Foolish Pleasure in the tragic 1975 match race against the great 3-year-old filly Ruffian, who had to be euthanized after she pulled up during the race with a broken front ankle.

Braulio Baeza retired in 1976 after having won 3140 races in the United States. He was inducted that same year into the National Museum of Racing and Hall of Fame.

=== Racing official ===
In 2005, while working as an assistant clerk of the scales for the New York Racing Association, Baeza was indicted alongside clerk of scales Mario Sclafani for 291 charges of falsely recording the weight of jockeys. Critics claimed the allegations were a farce and down to a clerical error. Two years later all charges were dropped and the case was thrown out.

Baeza subsequently worked as a racing official in West Virginia prior to his retirement, while his son, Braulio Baeza Jr., works as New York Gaming Commission racing steward at New York Racing Association tracks: Aqueduct Race Track, Belmont Park and Saratoga Race Course.

== Triple Crown record ==
Year	Kentucky Derby	Finish	Preakness	Finish	Belmont	Finish
1961	Crozier	2nd	Crozier	3rd	Sherluck	1st
1962	Admiral's Voyage	9th	-	-	Admiral's Voyage	2nd
1963	Chateaugay	1st	Chateaugay	2nd	Chateaugay	1st
1964	-	-	Quadrangle	4th	-	-
1964	-	-	-	-	Orientalist	6th
1965	-	-	-	-	Bold Bidder	8th
1966	Stupendous	4th	Stupendous	2nd	Stupendous	7th
1967	Successor	6th	-	-	-	-
1967	-	-	Great Power	10th	-	-
1967	-	-	-	-	Proud Clarion	4th
1968	Iron Ruler	11th	-	-	-	-
1968	-	-	-	-	Ardoise	5th
1969	Arts and Letters	2nd	Arts and Letters	2nd	Arts and Letters	1st
1970	Naskra	4th	-	-	-	-
1970	-	-	-	-	Aggressively	6th
1972	-	-	Key to the Mint	3rd	Key to the Mint	4th
1973	My Gallant	9th	-	-	-	-
1973	-	-	-	-	Twice A Prince	2nd
1974	Triple Crown	17th	-	-	-	-
1974	-	-	Rube the Great	9th	Rube the Great	4th
1975	Prince Thou Art	6th	Prince Thou Art	4th	Prince Thou Art	5th
1976	Honest Pleasure	2nd	Honest Pleasure	5th	-	-

Kentucky Derby: 12-1-3-0

Preakness Stakes: 10-0-3-2

Belmont Stakes: 14-3-2-0
