= Maine Chance Farm =

American racehorse stable

Coordinates: 38.126°N 84.486°W

- Type: Horse breeding/Thoroughbred racing Stable
- Industry: Thoroughbred horse racing
- Founded: 1943
- Headquarters: Iron Works Pike, Lexington, Kentucky, United States
- Key people: Elizabeth Arden, owner Trainers: Alex Gordon; William Molter; Ike K. Mourar; Edward A. Neloy; Ivan H. Parke; Jack H. Skirvin; James W. Smith; Tom Smith; Roy Waldron

Maine Chance Farm was the name of Elizabeth Arden's Thoroughbred horse racing stable and, from 1956, her horse farm in Lexington, Kentucky. Arden adopted the name for her racing stable in 1943 from "Maine Chance", her health and beauty spa in Mount Vernon, Maine. The Kentucky farm became the physical base of Arden's Thoroughbred breeding and racing operation after she acquired the property in 1956. The property has been part of the University of Kentucky since 1967.

== Maine Chance spas ==
In 1929, Arden (under her personal name, Florence Nightingale Graham) bought about 750 acres (3.0 km^{2}) near Mount Vernon, Maine, where her friend Elisabeth Marbury had a summer property. Arden named her estate "Maine Chance Farm". "Main chance" is an idiom that means chief opportunity for success.

After Marbury died in 1933, Arden bought the adjacent property and transformed the combined properties into a 1,200-acre residential health and beauty spa. The Maine Chance spa offered women a resort with sport and outdoor activities, special diets, exercise classes, beauty and spa treatments, and evenings playing bridge. The resort became a destination beauty spa that attracted famous guests such as Mamie Eisenhower, Judy Garland, and Ava Gardner.

Arden expanded Maine Chance to Arizona in 1946, opening a winter health and beauty resort at the foot of Camelback Mountain in Phoenix, Arizona. The Maine and Arizona resorts operated seasonally, with the Maine location serving as the summer resort and the Arizona location operating during the winter.

The name "Maine Chance Farm" subsequently became associated with Arden's Thoroughbred operation. In 1943, she adopted it as the name under which her horses raced, borrowing the name from her Maine estate and spa.

== Racing stable ==
Arden's given name was Florence Nightingale Graham; "Elizabeth Arden" was the trade name of her cosmetics business, which she also sometimes used personally. In racing, she was known as Mrs. Elizabeth N. Graham and her horses raced under the nom de course "Mr. Nightingale" until 1943 when she adopted the name Maine Chance Farm from her health spa. Kentucky racing official Ted Bassett later suggested the choice was a shrewd piece of marketing: tying her horses' name to that of her health spa meant the racing public kept the spa in mind, while spa clientele and the press were reminded of her stable.

During the nineteen forties and fifties, the Maine Chance Farm racing stable was a major force in American horse racing. Among the stable's many champions and stakes race winners who raced under her cerise, blue and white colors were the colt Star Pilot and the filly, Beaugay, both 1945 American national champions. The Beaugay Handicap at Aqueduct Racetrack is named in the filly's honor. That year, Maine Chance Farm was the top money-winning stable in the United States.

In May 1946, a fire at a racetrack in Chicago destroyed twenty-two horses owned by Maine Chance Farm. The stable's two-year-old star colt Jet Pilot survived as he had been shipped to another racetrack. Two future Hall of Famers, trainer Tom Smith and jockey Eric Guerin, worked for Maine Chance Farm and in 1947, Jet Pilot won the Kentucky Derby. In 1948, Ace Admiral won the prestigious Travers Stakes and in 1954 the Maine Chance filly Fascinator won the Kentucky Oaks.

== Kentucky farm ==
In 1956, Elizabeth Arden, Inc. acquired the 722-acre (2.92 km^{2}) northern portion of Coldstream Stud on the death of owner E. Dale Shaffer and renamed it "Maine Chance Farm". The Kentucky property served as a horse farm associated with Arden's established Maine Chance racing operation. It provided facilities for breeding and keeping Thoroughbreds. Graham (Arden) pampered her Thoroughbreds at this farm, reportedly even having them groomed with Elizabeth Arden skincare products.

In 1960, the farm bred future Hall of Fame colt Gun Bow.

She died in 1966. In 1967, the University of Kentucky purchased the farm for agricultural and equine education and research. Since 2007 it has been home to UK's undergraduate Equine Science and Management program, and today, known as the Maine Chance Equine Campus, forms part of the university's 2,400 acres (9.7 km^{2}) "North Farm" alongside the neighboring Spindletop and Coldstream research farms.
