= John M. Schiff =

American banker and scouting leader (1904–1987)

- Born: John Mortimer Schiff; August 26, 1904; Roslyn, New York, U.S.
- Died: May 9, 1987 (aged 82); Oyster Bay, New York, U.S.
- Education: Yale University (B.A.)
- Occupation: Banker
- Known for: President of Boy Scouts of America
- Board member of: John Simon Guggenheim Memorial Foundation; World Scout Committee (1955-1961)
- Spouse(s): Edith Baker (died 1975), Josephine Laimbeer Fell (m. 1975)
- Children: 2
- Parent: Mortimer Loeb Schiff
- Relatives: Jacob H. Schiff (grandfather), David M. Heyman
- Awards: Breeder of 1970 American Champion Two-Year-Old Colt Hoist the Flag
- Honors: Bronze Wolf

John Mortimer Schiff (August 26, 1904 – May 9, 1987) was an American investment banker and philanthropist. He was a partner in the firm Kuhn, Loeb & Co., as well as a trustee of the John Simon Guggenheim Memorial Foundation, a breeder of championship thoroughbred racehorses, and the national president of the Boy Scouts of America from 1951 to 1956.

== Early life and education ==
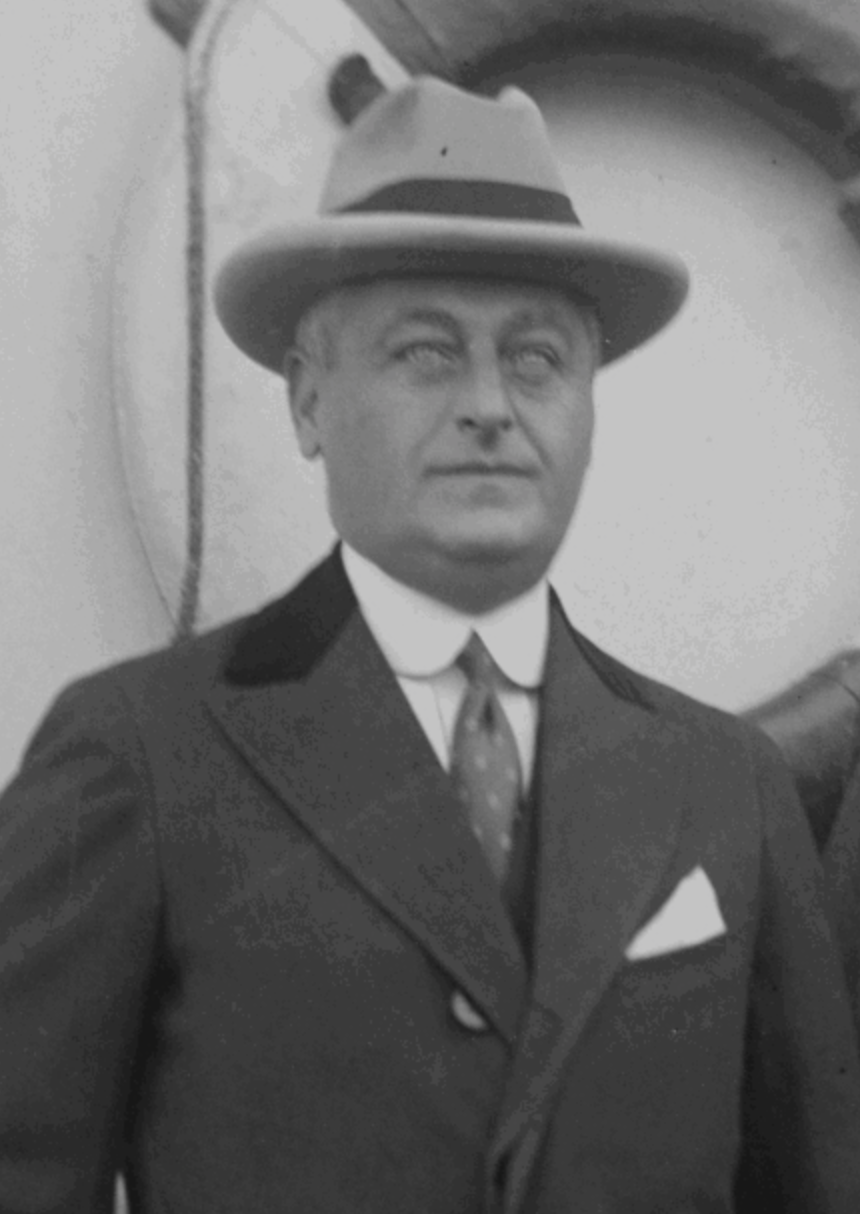
Schiff's father Mortimer

Schiff was born to a German-Jewish banking family in New York, the son of Adele (née Neustadt) and Mortimer Loeb Schiff. He was grandson of Jacob H. Schiff. In 1925, Schiff graduated from Yale University, where he was an assistant business manager of campus humor magazine The Yale Record. After a year at Oxford University in England, he worked at Bankers Trust.

== Career ==
For a time, Schiff worked on the Missouri Pacific Railroad. Following the 1931 death of his father, he became a partner in the investment banking firm Kuhn, Loeb & Co.

=== Scouting movement ===
Both John Schiff and his father were notable early Boy Scouts of America leaders. John Schiff served as national president of the Boy Scouts of America from 1951 to 1956. Schiff also served on the World Scout Committee of the World Organization of the Scout Movement from 1955 until 1961.

Schiff was awarded the Bronze Wolf, the only distinction of the World Organization of the Scout Movement, awarded by the World Scout Committee for exceptional services to world Scouting, in 1961. The John M. Schiff Scout Reservation was named in his honor.

=== Thoroughbred horse racing ===
Schiff owned and bred thoroughbred racehorses. He was the breeder of the 1970 American Champion Two-Year-Old Colt Hoist the Flag and successfully raced a number of horses including Plugged Nickle and Droll Role.

=== Philanthropy ===
From 1965 to 1976, Schiff served as a Trustee of the John Simon Guggenheim Memorial Foundation then as Trustee Emeritus until his death in 1987.

== Personal life ==
John Schiff married Edith Brevoort Baker, granddaughter of George Fisher Baker who was called "the richest, most powerful and most taciturn commercial banker in U. S. history" in a 1934 TIME magazine article. They had two sons, David T. and Peter G. Schiff. After his first wife's death in 1975, he married Josephine Laimbeer Fell, the widow of John R. Fell Jr., who had been a partner in Lehman Brothers.

His son David served as chairman of Wildlife Conservation Society and married Martha Elizabeth Lawler in an Episcopal ceremony in 1963. In 1997, David's son, Andrew Newman Schiff, married former Vice-President Al Gore's daughter, Karenna Aitcheson Gore in an Episcopal ceremony at the Washington National Cathedral.

== See also ==
- Mortimer L. Schiff Scout Reservation

Boy Scouts of America
Preceded by Amory Houghton	National president 1951–1956	Succeeded by Kenneth K. Bechtel
