= Arthur B. Hancock Jr. =

American breeder and owner of thoroughbred racehorses

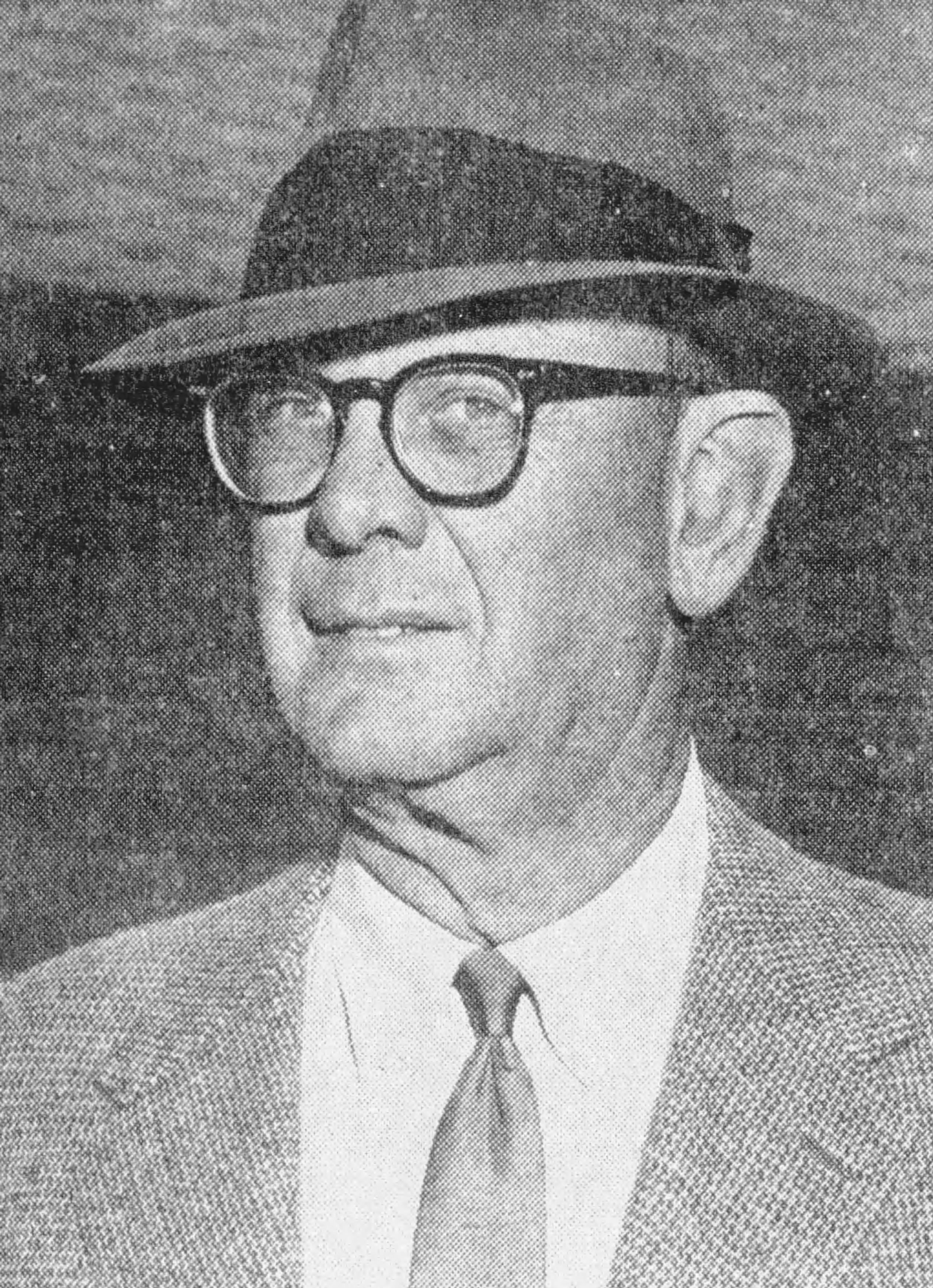
- Hancock in a photo published alongside his 1972 Lexington Herald obituary
- Born: January 24, 1910; Bourbon County, Kentucky, U.S.
- Died: September 14, 1972 (aged 62); Nashville, Tennessee, U.S.
- Resting place: Paris Cemetery, Kentucky
- Education: Princeton University; Woodberry Forest School; St. Mark's School
- Occupation: Thoroughbred racehorse owner/breeder
- Known for: Claiborne Farm
- Spouse: Waddell Walker (1914–2005)
- Children: Sons: Arthur III, Seth W. Daughters: Nancy Clay, Waddell Walker
- Parent(s): Arthur B. Hancock; Nancy Clay
- Awards: Hall of Fame inductee (2016)

Arthur B. "Bull" Hancock Jr. (January 24, 1910 – September 14, 1972) was a breeder and owner of thoroughbred racehorses at Claiborne Farm in Paris, Kentucky, United States. He acquired European horses to breed in the United States, in particular Nasrullah and Princequillo, and gained great standing in the racing world as a result.

== Early life ==
Hancock was born on January 24, 1910, to Arthur B. Hancock and Nancy, née Clay, at Claiborne Farm. He was educated at two prep schools: St. Mark's School in Massachusetts and Woodberry Forest School in Virginia. He graduated from Princeton University in 1933. During World War II, Hancock served as a major in the United States Army Air Forces.

== Horse breeder ==
From age six, Hancock began to learn the horse business from his father, sweeping sheds and shaking empty stalls. In 1957, Hancock inherited Claiborne, a 2,873 acre stud farm near Paris, Kentucky, and concentrated on breeding major winners and importing European stallions. Wanting a son of the great Nearco, in partnership with William Woodward Sr. and Harry F. Guggenheim, he purchased the Irish stallion Nasrullah. Hancock and his partners then syndicated Nasrullah, who sired Bold Ruler and who in turn was the leading sire in North America eight times and whose progeny included U.S. Triple Crown winner, Secretariat. During his career at stud, Nasrullah sired 98 stakes winners in all and was the leading sire in North America five times. Hancock also imported Princequillo, who sired Secretariat's dam, Somethingroyal, and was the leading sire twice and leading broodmare sire in North America eight times. In addition, Hancock bred and stood Round Table, syndicated Nijinsky II, and managed the career of Buckpasser.

While under Hancock's control, Claiborne Farm grew to roughly 6,000 acres. Hancock bred 112 stakes winners in the Claiborne name and was also an advisor to prominent outside clients, including the Phipps family and William Woodward Sr. Claiborne bred at least one champion each year during this period, including five years when the farm produced as many as four divisional champions. Hancock also bred four European champions, including Nureyev and Arc de Triomphe winner Ivanjica. Champions Moccasin, Nadir, Doubledogdare, and Bayou also raced under the Claiborne colors. Claiborne was America's top breeder in earnings in 1958, 1959, 1968, and 1969 under Hancock's direction.

During Hancock's era, Claiborne was the birthplace of thirty-two champions that raced for outside clients, including Hall of Fame members Kelso, Nashua, Bold Ruler, Round Table, Cicada, Buckpasser and Riva Ridge. Hancock had plans for Sham, whom he called "my great horse", but he died when the horse was two. To keep the breeding stock, the estate sold all the racing stock, and Sham went to Sigmund Sommer, who raced the horse against Secretariat during the Triple Crown in 1973.

Hancock was the first working horseman elected to The Jockey Club. He was also president of the American Thoroughbred Breeders Association and vice president of the American Thoroughbred Owners Association. He was crucial in merging those two organizations in 1961 into the Thoroughbred Owners and Breeders Association. He was a director and trustee at Keeneland, a director of Churchill Downs, a member of the Kentucky Horse Racing Commission, a director of the Grayson Foundation, and a founding member and director of the Thoroughbred Breeders of Kentucky in which role he played a part in establishing the American Horse Council.

In 1999, the Racing Post named him at number 12 in their 100 Makers of 20th-century horse racing.

== Death ==
In August 1972, Hancock fell ill while hunting in Scotland. He died a few weeks later of pancreatic cancer at Vanderbilt University Medical Center in Nashville, Tennessee. He was buried in the Paris Cemetery in Kentucky. His widow established the A. B. Hancock Jr. Memorial Laboratory for Cancer Research at Vanderbilt University Medical Center.

Racing journalist Peter Willett said, "Bull was the biggest man, physically speaking, in the thoroughbred industry of his day, and towered above most of his contemporaries in professional ability and the dominance of his personality."

In 2016, Hancock was inducted into the National Museum of Racing and Hall of Fame as a Pillar of the Turf.
