= Obeah Stakes =

- Class: Non-Graded Stakes
- Location: Delaware Park Racetrack; Stanton, Delaware, United States
- Race type: Thoroughbred - Flat racing
- Website: web.archive.org/web/20100105183048/http://delawarepark.com/racing.php

Race information
- Distance: 1 1/8 miles (9 furlongs)
- Surface: Dirt
- Track: left-handed
- Qualification: Three-years-old & up
- Weight: Assigned
- Purse: $150,000 (2023)

The Obeah Stakes is an American Thoroughbred horse race run annually in mid June at Delaware Park Racetrack in Stanton, Delaware. Formerly a Grade III event, it is contested on dirt at a previous distance of a mile and an eighth (9 furlongs). The race is now one and one-sixteenth miles and permits horses three years and older to compete.

The race is named in honor of Jane du Pont Lunger's filly, Obeah, winner of the Delaware Handicap in 1969 and 1970.

== Historical notes ==
After a nine-month layoff, the filly Unbridled Belle ran second in the 2007 Obeah, won the 2008 edition by nearly six lengths and at age six, won the 2009 race by eleven lengths.

== Records ==
Speed record:

- 1 1/8 miles - 1:48.05 - Fleet Indian (2006)

Most wins by a jockey:

- 3 - Ramon Dominguez (2002, 2005 & 2008)

Most wins by a trainer:

- 3 - Todd Pletcher (2005, 2008 & 2009)

== Winners ==
Year	Winner	Age	Jockey	Trainer	Owner	Dist. (Miles)	Time	Purse $	Gr.
2023	Award Wanted	6	Angel Cruz	John Robb	No Guts No Glory Farm and Erica Upton	1-1/16	1:49.28	$150,000	Listed
2020	Lucky Move	6	Roberto Rosado	Juan Guerrero	Ten Strike Racing	1-1/16	1:42.28	$100,000	Listed
2019	Gotham Gala	4	Daniel Centeno	Arnaud Delacour	Mark B. Grier	1-1/8	1:50.74	$100,000	Listed
2018	Teresa Z	4	Daniel Centeno	Anthony R. Margotta, Jr.	St. Elias Stables	1-1/8	1:49.33	$100,000	Listed
2017	Power of Snunner	7	Edwin Gonzalez	Timothy C. Kreiser	James M. Courtney	1-1/8	1:50.26	$100,000	Listed
2016	I'm a Chatterbox	4	Gabriel Saez	J. Larry Jones	Fletcher and Carolyn Gray	1-1/8	1:53.20	$100,000	Listed
2015	Luna Time	4	Forest Boyce	H. Graham Motion	Brown/Palmer	1-1/8	1:49.58	$100,000	III
2014	Gamay Noir	4	Daniel Centeno	Martin D. Wolfson	Chasing Tail Stables	1-1/8	1:51.22	$150,000	III
2013	Bryan's Jewel	5	Alex Cintron	McLean Robertson	Barry & Joni Butzow	1-1/8	1:51.21	$100,000	III
2012	Love and Pride	4	Jeremy Rose	Todd Pletcher	Green Hills Farm	1-1/8	1:49.91	$150,000	III
2011	Havre de Grace	4	Gabriel Saez	J. Larry Jones	Fox Hill Farms	1-1/8	1:49.87	$100,000	III
2010	Miss Singhsix	5	Jose Valdivia, Jr.	Martin Wolfson	Team Valor International	1-1/8	1:50.87	$100,000	III
2009	Unbridled Belle	6	Richard Migliore	Todd Pletcher	Team Valor	1-1/8	1:50.79	$100,000	III
2008	Unbridled Belle	5	Ramon Dominguez	Todd Pletcher	Team Valor	1-1/8	1:49.72	$100,000	III
2007	Peak Maria's Way	4	Joseph Rocco	Michael E. Gorham	Old Coach Farm & John D. Murphy	1-1/8	1:49.38	$100,000	
2006	Fleet Indian	5	José A. Santos	Paul H. Saylor	Paul H. Saylor	1-1/8	1:49.05	$100,000	
2005	Isola Piu Bella	5	Ramon Dominguez	Todd Pletcher	Sumaya US Stables	1-1/8	1:53.68	$100,000	
2004	Misty Sixes	6	Mario Pino	Steve Klesaris	Puglisi Stables	1-1/8	1:51.23	$100,000	
2003	Devon Rose	4	Anthony Black	Allen Iwinski	Richard Englander	1-1/8	1:50.24	$100,000	
2002	Your Out	6	Ramon Dominguez	H. Graham Motion	Eugene Ford	1-1/8	1:52.54	$100,000	
2001	Under the Rug	6	Mark Johnston	James W. Murphy	Jane du Pont Lunger	1-1/8	1:51.20	$100,000	
2000	Her Halo	4	Michael J. McCarthy	Allen Iwinski	Acclaimed Racing Stable	1-1/8	1:49.54	$100,000	
1999	Pocho's Dream Girl	5	Jesus Castanon	Alan E. Goldberg	Robert Masterson	1-1/8	1:50.30	$100,000	
1998	Winter Melody	5	Michael J. McCarthy	Robert W. Camac	Arthur I. Appleton	1-1/8	1:49.54	$75,000	
1997	Winter Melody	4	Anthony Black	Robert W. Camac	Arthur I. Appleton	1-1/8	1:50.80	$50,000	
1996	Scratch Paper	4	Kevin Whitley	Randy Nunley	Ronald V. Wise	1-1/16	1:44.81	$50,000	
1995	Shananie's Beat	4	Edwin L. King Jr.	Kathleen O'Connell	Gilbert G. Campbell	6 fur.	1:10.55	$20,000	
1985	1994	Race not held							
1984	Bishop's Fling	5	Alberto Delgado	Katherine M. Voss	John Merryman	1-1/16	1:42.60	$20,000	
