= 1982 Preakness Stakes =

107th running of the Preakness Stakes

107th Preakness Stakes
- The Preakness Stakes
- Location: Pimlico Race Course, Baltimore, Maryland, United States
- Date: May 15, 1982
- Winning horse: Aloma's Ruler
- Jockey: Jack Kaenel
- Conditions: Fast
- Surface: Dirt

The 1982 Preakness Stakes was the 107th running of the $300,000 Grade 1 Preakness Stakes thoroughbred horse race. The race took place on May 15, 1982, and was televised in the United States on the ABC television network. Aloma's Ruler, who was jockeyed by Jack Kaenel, won the race by a half of a length over runner-up Linkage. Approximate post time was 5:41 p.m. Eastern Time. The race was run on a fast track in a final time of 1:55 2/5. The Maryland Jockey Club reported total attendance of 80,724, this is recorded as second highest on the list of American thoroughbred racing top attended events for North America in 1982.

== Payout ==
The 107th Preakness Stakes Payout Schedule

Program Number	Horse Name	Win	Place	Show
7	Aloma's Ruler	$15.80	$4.60	$3.60
6	Linkage	-	$2.60	$2.60
2	Cut Away	-	-	$9.60

$2 Exacta: (7–6) paid $30.40

== The full chart ==
Finish Position	Margin (lengths)	Post Position	Horse name	Jockey	Trainer	Owner	Post Time Odds	Purse Earnings
1st	0	7	Aloma's Ruler	Jack Kaenel	John J. Lenzini Jr.	Nathan Scherr	6.90-1	$209,900
2nd	1/2	6	Linkage	Bill Shoemaker	Henry S. Clark	Christiana Stable	0.50-1 favorite	$40,000
3rd	7-1/4	2	Cut Away	Jerry Bailey	Eugene Jacobs	Herbert Allen	41.60-1	$20,000
4th	91/4	4	Bold Style	Leroy Moyers	Jack Van Berg	Len Mayer	26.20-1	$10,000
5th	111/4	5	Laser Light	Eddie Maple	Patrick J. Kelly	Live Oak Plantation	5.30-1	
6th	111/2	1	Reinvested	Don MacBeth	Stanley M. Hough	Harbor View Farm	7.60-1	
7th	161/2	3	Water Bank	Marco Castaneda	Ronald McAnally	Elmendorf Farm	12.00-1	

- Winning Breeder: Silk Willoughby Farm; (FL)
- Times: 1/4 mile – 0:23 4/5; 1/2 mile – 0:48 flat; 3/4 mile – 1:12 flat; mile – 1:36 2/5; 1 3/16 (final) – 1:55 2/5
- Track Condition: Fast
- Total Attendance: 80,724
