= Go For Wand =

American-bred Thoroughbred racehorse

- Sire: Deputy Minister
- Grandsire: Vice Regent
- Dam: Obeah
- Damsire: Cyane
- Sex: Filly
- Foaled: April 6, 1987; Unionville, Pennsylvania, U.S.
- Died: October 27, 1990 (aged 3); Elmont, New York, U.S.
- Country: United States
- Colour: Bay
- Breeder: Christiana Stables
- Owner: Christiana Stable
- Trainer: William Badgett Jr.
- Record: 13: 10-2-0
- Earnings: $1,373,338

Major wins
- Ashland Stakes (1990); Alabama Stakes (1990); Beldame Stakes (1990); Mother Goose Stakes (1990); Test Stakes (1990); Maskette Stakes (1990) Breeders' Cup wins: Breeders' Cup Juvenile Fillies (1989)

Awards
- American Champion Two-Year-Old Filly (1989); American Champion Three-Year-Old Filly (1990)

Honours
- United States Racing Hall of Fame (1996) #72 - Top 100 U.S. Racehorses of the 20th Century; Go For Wand Handicap at Saratoga Race Course; Go for Wand Stakes at Delaware Park Racetrack
- Last updated on September 28, 2020

Go For Wand (April 6, 1987 – October 27, 1990) was a champion American thoroughbred racehorse.

Go For Wand was sired by Canadian Hall of Famer Deputy Minister, out of Obeah (winner of, among other races, the Blue Hen Stakes, and the Delaware Handicap twice). She was foaled and raised at Jane du Pont Lunger's Christiana Stables. As a two-year-old, she had a record of three-for-four before winning the 1989 Breeders' Cup Juvenile Fillies. Her performances earned her the 1989 Eclipse Award for Outstanding Two-Year-Old Filly.

As a three-year-old, she was seven-for-nine and was voted the 1990 Eclipse Award for Outstanding Three-Year-Old Filly. In 1990 at Belmont Park she ran against the Argentinian mare Bayakoa in the Breeders' Cup Distaff. Go For Wand was leading by a head at the sixteenth pole when she suffered an open fracture to her right cannon bone. She fell to the track and threw jockey Randy Romero to the ground before rising to limp on three legs. Romero broke his pelvis and several ribs. Track personnel caught Go For Wand and got her to lie down, and she was immediately euthanized on the track. The next day, she was buried in the infield at Saratoga racetrack.

Like the death of Ruffian at the same track in July 1975, the accident was shown by NBC on live television, and reminded viewers of that promising filly who was fatally injured on the track. Several veterinarians estimate that she broke her leg about twelve strides before she fell, which would mean that she suffered her catastrophic injury while passing the flagpole next to which Ruffian was buried.

In 1992, the Maskette Stakes, a Grade 1 handicap race for fillies and mares, was renamed the "Go For Wand Handicap" in her memory.

She is listed as #72 by Blood Horse on their list of top 100 U.S. thoroughbred champions of the 20th Century and in 1996 was inducted into the National Museum of Racing and Hall of Fame.

As part of the "Thoroughbred Legends" series, in 2000, author Bill Heller published a book about the filly titled "Go For Wand." - Eclipse Press (ISBN 1-58150-046-7)

== Pedigree ==
Pedigree of Go For Wand, bay filly, 1987
Sire Deputy Minister	Vice Regent	Northern Dancer	Nearctic
Sire Deputy Minister	Vice Regent	Northern Dancer	Natalma
Sire Deputy Minister	Vice Regent	Victoria Regina	Menetrier
Sire Deputy Minister	Vice Regent	Victoria Regina	Victoriana
Sire Deputy Minister	Mint Copy	Bunty's Flight	Bunty Lawless
Sire Deputy Minister	Mint Copy	Bunty's Flight	Broomflight
Sire Deputy Minister	Mint Copy	Shakney	Jabneh
Sire Deputy Minister	Mint Copy	Shakney	Grass Shack
Dam Obeah	Cyane	Turn-to	Royal Charger
Dam Obeah	Cyane	Turn-to	Source Sucree
Dam Obeah	Cyane	Your Game	Beau Pere
Dam Obeah	Cyane	Your Game	Winkle
Dam Obeah	Book of Verse	One Count	Count Fleet
Dam Obeah	Book of Verse	One Count	Ace Card
Dam Obeah	Book of Verse	Persian Maid	Tehran
Dam Obeah	Book of Verse	Persian Maid	Aroma (family: 2-f)
