= Jack Kaenel =

American jockey

Personal information
- Born: 27 July 1965 (age 61) Omaha, Nebraska
- Occupation: Jockey

Horse racing career
- Sport: Horse racing
- Career wins: 2,046

Major racing wins
- Caesar's Wish Stakes (1981); Selima Stakes (1981); Federico Tesio Stakes (1982); Molly Pitcher Stakes (1982); Twixt Stakes (1982, 1984); Withers Stakes (1982); Flocarline Handicap (1983); Maryland Juvenile Futurity (1983); Pennsylvania Governor's Cup Handicap (1984); Violet Handicap (1984); Bangles and Beads Stakes (1985); Louisiana Downs Handicap (1985); Gateway To Glory Stakes(1986); Hollywood Turf Express Handicap (1986); Phil D. Shepherd Stakes (1986); Pomona Derby (1986); Ancient Title Stakes (1987); Bing Crosby Handicap (1987); Parx Racing Breeders’ Cup Sprint (1987); Jim Kostoff Stakes (1987); Pat O'Brien Handicap (1987); Phoenix Gold Cup Handicap (1987); San Carlos Handicap (1987); Santa Anita Sprint Championship (1987); Stephen Foster Handicap (1987); California Jockey Club Handicap (1988, 1989); Hillsborough Handicap (1988); Tanforan Handicap (1988); Ramona Handicap (1989); Countess Fager Handicap (1989); Yellow Ribbon Invitational Stakes (1989); Yerba Buena Handicap (1989); Santa Barbara Handicap (1990); Seattle Slew Handicap (1990); Gottstein Futurity (1993); Minnesota Derby (1994) American Classic Race wins: Preakness Stakes (1982)

Significant horses
- Aloma's Ruler, Brown Bess, Zany Tactics, Jameela

"Cowboy" Jack Leroy Kaenel (born July 27, 1965, in Omaha, Nebraska) is a retired American jockey in Thoroughbred racing who, at age 16, became the youngest rider to ever win the second leg of the U.S. Triple Crown series when he rode Aloma's Ruler to victory in the 1982 Preakness Stakes.

== Background ==
Widely known as "Cowboy" Jack Kaenel, he grew up in Thoroughbred racing with a father who had been a jockey and a trainer at racetracks in the U. S. Midwest. While still a boy of eleven, Jack Kaenel began riding at bush tracks and even after he had won the Preakness Stakes he told a reporter that his greatest thrill in racing was the day he won the $400 Watermelon Derby in Rocky Ford, Colorado at the age of twelve.

Kaenel began his professional riding career in Canada where at Assiniboia Downs in Winnipeg, Manitoba he declared he was the legal age of sixteen to get a jockey license and produced a State of Kansas birth certificate showing a July 27, 1964 date of birth. Making his debut on September 12, 1980, Kaenel quickly showed he was a rider of considerable talent, winning 20 races during the race meet including four in one day. When the Assiniboia Downs season ended, Kaenel returned to the United States where he raced until May 5, 1981, when it was learned that his birth certificate had been a fake and he was actually fifteen years old. His jockey license was revoked and he went back to riding at the Midwest bush tracks for the next three months until he turned sixteen on July 27. Kaenel still had a good year in 1981 scoring a Grade 1 in the Selima Stakes aboard the good filly Snow Plow.

=== Pre-1982 Preakness career ===
Prior to the big race, Aloma's Ruler had won the January 20, 1982 Bahamas Stakes at Hialeah Park over a distance of seven furlongs. He was ridden by star jockey Ángel Cordero for trainer John Lenzini and owner Nathan Scherr, a Baltimore contractor. In that race Aloma's Ruler beat some of the top three-year-olds competing on the U. S. East Coast including Deputy Minister. A week later the colt injured an ankle during a workout and would not race again until the end of April when he ran second in an allowance race. Just one week before the Preakness, Aloma's Ruler was scheduled to run in the Withers Stakes, a mile race at Aqueduct Racetrack in Queens, New York. However, trainer John Lenzini had not been able to secure Cordero or any of the other top jockeys he had wanted when Jack Kaenel's agent convinced Lenzini to give his good young jockey the mount. The "New York Times quoted the trainer as saying Jack Kaenel wasn't my first choice …… or second, third or fourth, to tell the truth." Kaenel and Aloma's Ruler won the Withers in convincing fashion and Lenzini said the jockey gave the colt "a perfect ride." That performance guarantee the sixteen-year-old Kaenel would be aboard the colt in the Preakness.

=== The 1982 Preakness Stakes ===
The May 15, 1982 edition of the Grade 1 Preakness Stakes at Pimlico Race Course in Baltimore, Maryland marked its 107th running. For Aloma's Ruler, the Preakness would be the colt's third race in just seventeen days but his sire, Iron Ruler, was a proven producer of very durable runners. Race day, the Pimlico track was fast and the field had just seven starters. Aloma's Ruler drew the seventh and outside post position.

The overwhelming race favorite was Jane du Pont Lunger's colt Linkage. This come-from-behind stretch runner was ridden by the then fifty-year-old Bill Shoemaker, a Hall of Fame jockey who had won more races and more purse money than any jockey in American racing history. When the gate opened, Aloma's Ruler broke from the gate and started to turn right but jockey Kaenel immediately straightened the colt out then angled him left and began quickly passing the field to take the lead where he set the slower pace he wanted. Aloma's Ruler remained in front and at the head of the homestretch he had a length a 1½ length lead. At that point, sixteen-year-old Jack Kaenel's slower pace strategy left Aloma's Ruler with enough stamina to withstand the hard charging Linkage and win by half a length. The New York Times story on the race summed it up perfectly, writing that "Kaenel outfoxed Shoemaker as if their ages and experience were reversed." A record Preakness purse of $279,900 gave Aloma's Ruler owner Nathan Scherr first money of $209,900.

=== Post Preakness Stakes ===
In the Belmont Stakes, third leg of the 1982 U.S. Triple Crown series, Aloma's Ruler was never really a factor after heavy rain left a sloppy racetrack. Conquistador Cielo, the eventual winner, soon took the lead and was able to set a strong pace in the mud. At the three-quarters pole Aloma's Ruler was fourth but faded to finish ninth in the mile and a half distance that the colt had never run before.

Although Jack Kaenel never rode in another Triple Crown race, he went on to win numerous stakes races while becoming one of the most colorful and well-traveled jockeys in the country. For nine years he rode on the West Coast of the United States. Although his riding was interrupted in mid-year 1989 by a badly broken right leg sustained at his ranch in Northern California, Jack Kaenel was the principal rider for the racemare Brown Bess. He guided her to American Champion Female Turf Horse honors that year with five graded stakes wins.

Among his other top horses, Jack Kaenel rode Zany Tactics in most of his races including the 1987 Grade 3 Phoenix Gold Cup Handicap at Turf Paradise Race Course in Phoenix, Arizona in which he set a new world record time of 1:06 4/5 for six furlongs on dirt.

Jack Kaenel rode for the last time in 2007, retiring with 2046 wins to his credit. His son Kyle Kaenel, born in 1988, became a jockey. In a career cut short by injuries, he rode from 2004 to 2009 and retired having a very good 14% winning percentage.
