= Obeah (horse) =

American-bred Thoroughbred racehorse

- Obeah's grave at Claiborne Farm
- Sire: Cyane
- Grandsire: Turn-To
- Dam: Book of Verse
- Damsire: One Count
- Sex: Mare
- Foaled: 1965
- Country: United States
- Colour: Bay
- Breeder: Bertram N. Linder
- Owner: Christiana Stables
- Trainer: Henry S. Clark
- Record: 46: 11-13-3
- Earnings: US$387,299

Major wins
- Blue Hen Stakes (1967); Delaware Handicap (1969, 1970); Firenze Handicap (1970)

Honours
- Obeah Stakes at Delaware Park Racetrack
- Last updated on July 5, 2010

Obeah (1965–1993) was an American Thoroughbred racehorse for whom the Obeah Stakes at Delaware Park Racetrack is named.

== Background ==
Bred in Kentucky by Bertram N. Linder, Obeah was sired by 1961 Futurity Stakes winner Cyane. Her dam was Book of Verse, a daughter of 1952 American Horse of the Year One Count. Obeah was bought for $10,000 at the 1966 Saratoga yearling auction by Harry and Jane Lunger, who owned her sire and who felt the filly was being bid too low.

Trained by future U.S. Racing Hall of Fame inductee Henry Clark, Obeah raced under the colors of the Lungers' Christiana Stables.

== Racing career ==
Racing at age two in 1967, Obeah won the Blue Hen Stakes at her Delaware Park Racetrack home base. Going around two turns, she ran 3rd in the Frizette Stakes at Belmont Park and second by a nose in the Jeanne d'Arc at Narragansett Park.

When she was three, her best result in a major race was a second in the Firenze Handicap. At age four, she won the 1969 Delaware Handicap in early August and then captured October's Vineland Handicap at Garden State Park.

Obeah returned to racing at age five and won her second straight edition of the Delaware Handicap. In late November, she captured the Firenze Handicap.

== Breeding record ==
Retired to broodmare duty in Kentucky for the Lungers, from her offspring Obeah produced four stakes winners, including Dance Spell and his full sister, Gazelle Handicap winner Discorama. Barren for a second time in 1985, the following year 22-year-old Obeah was sent to Windfields Farm in Maryland, where she was bred to Deputy Minister. The mating resulted in the birth of her greatest foal on April 6, 1987, a filly named Go For Wand born at Walnut Green Farm in Unionville, Pennsylvania owned by the Lungers' son-in law, Richard I. G. Jones. Voted the 1998 American Champion Two-Year-Old Filly and 1990 American Champion Three-Year-Old Filly, Go For Wand was inducted into the U.S. Racing Hall of Fame in 1996.

Pensioned in 1992 at Claiborne Farm at Paris, Kentucky, Obeah died at age twenty-eight in 1993 and was buried in Claiborne's Marchmont division cemetery.
