= Fleet Indian =

American-bred Thoroughbred racehorse

- Sire: Indian Charlie
- Grandsire: In Excess
- Dam: Hustleeta
- Damsire: Afleet
- Sex: Mare
- Country: United States
- Colour: Bay
- Breeder: Gulf Coast Farms LLC
- Owner: Paul H. Saylor
- Trainer: Todd Pletcher
- Record: 19: 13-0-1 ( 1 Did Not Finish )
- Earnings: US$1,704,513

Major wins
- Obeah Stakes (2006); Beldame Stakes (2006); Delaware Handicap (2006); Personal Ensign Stakes (2006); Sixty Sails Handicap (2006); Montauk Handicap (2005)

Awards
- American Champion Older Female Horse (2006)

Fleet Indian (March 8, 2001 – October 1, 2011) was an American Champion Thoroughbred racehorse. She was named American Champion Older Female Horse at the 2006 Eclipse Awards, an honor she is best known for.

== Background ==
The dark bay Fleet Indian was bred in New York by the Thomas-Lakin partnership. She was sired by Indian Charlie, winner of the 1998 Santa Anita Derby, who was in turn sired by four-time Gr.I winner In Excess. Fleet Indian's dam Hulstleeta was sired by Afleet, the 1987 Canadian Horse of the Year.

Fleet Indian was known for her large, over-sized frame. Standing at 17 hands high, she was given the nickname "Large Marge".

Fleet Indian was sold at auction twice before making her race debut, the first time selling for $40,000 at the 2002 Fasig-Tipton New York Yearling Sale, and again for $230,000 at Ocala's Two-Year-Olds in Training Sale.

She was again sold at the beginning of 2006 in the Keeneland January Horses of All Ages Sale, being bought by Paul H. Saylor for a price tag of $290,000.

== Racing career ==
=== 2004: Sophomore Season ===
Fleet Indian was originally trained by James "Jimmy" Toner, later being transferred to Todd Pletcher's barn in 2006, during championship season.

Fleet Indian did not race as a juvenile. She made her first start at Aqueduct Racetrack on April 9, 2004, in a maiden race, which she won in a hand-ride by over 8 lengths. She won her following three races, and made her graded stakes debut in the Alabama Stakes, going into the race undefeated in four starts. The Alabama field was notable in that it featured Ashado, who was named Champion Juvenile Filly the year before, and who would be named Champion Three-Year-Old Filly of 2004.

Fleet Indian finished a disappointing fifth in the race behind Yearly Report, Ashado, Stellar Jayne, and winner Society Selection. Fleet Indian followed her poor performance with a third-place finish in an allowance the next month. After the allowance, she made her final start of 2004 in the Iroquois Handicap, an ungraded black-type race at Belmont Park, finishing fourth.

=== 2005: Four-Year-Old Season ===
After going 10 months without a race, Fleet Indian opened her career as an older mare in August 2005 in an allowance race at Saratoga, finishing ninth and last of the field. She greatly improved on her recent poor races next-out when she won an allowance, this time at Belmont Park. Afterwards, she again contested the Iroquois Handicap, finishing eighth. This would mark the end of Fleet Indian's poor performances.

Fleet Indian won her first stakes race, and first of many, after the Iroquois, when she won the Montauk Handicap at Aqueduct. She closed out her 2005 campaign with another allowance race.

=== 2006: Championship Season ===
Fleet Indian returned to graded stakes company in the first race of what would become her Championship year. Now trained by Todd Pletcher, Fleet Indian entered the Gr.III Next Move Handicap, one of the favorites in the small field of four. She on the race by just over a length, with a final time of 1:49.32. Following her graded win, Fleet Indian contested another, this time the Gr.III Sixty Sails Handicap. The race favorite, she dominated the field of 8, pulling away in the stretch to win by over 12 lengths. Her next race was the ungraded black-type Obeah Stakes at Delaware Park, a race Fleet Indian was using as a prep for the Gr.II Delaware Handicap. She won the Obeah by over 7 lengths.

Next came the Delaware Handicap. Once again the 2–5 favorite for the race, Fleet Indian broke cleanly from the gate, and led the field early on. She won the race by 5 1/2 lengths in gate-to-wire fashion.

Fleet Indian won her first Gr.I race, the Personal Ensign, next out, winning by 4 lengths, again in gate-to-wire fashion. Fleet Indian looked to keep her seven-race winning streak going when she contested the Gr.I Beldame Stakes, a final prep for the Breeders' Cup Distaff. Unlike most of her other races, Fleet Indian was confronted down the stretch by familiar foe Balletto, and the two dueled to the wire. Fleet Indian narrowly prevailed, however, by a head victory over Balletto. Round Pond notable finished third in the race.

==== 2006 Breeders' Cup Distaff ====
Fleet Indian was made the co-favorite for the 2006 Breeders' Cup Distaff, alongside Pine Island. Fleet Indian broke well, but raced far back in the pack, which was unusual for the mare who typically raced on or close to the lead. Entering the turn, Fleet Indian labored and was pulled up, shortly being vanned off. Entering the stretch, Pine Island dislocated her left front fetlock and fell. Like Fleet Indian, she was rushed onto an equine ambulance and vanned off.

After the race, which was won by Beldame Stakes third-place finisher Round Pond, it was discovered that Fleet Indian had suffered a lateral colyndar fracture. Fleet Indian had surgery at Dr. Larry Bramlage's Rood & Riddle Equine Hospital in Lexington, Kentucky, and survived her injuries. Pine Island was not so lucky, however, and she was euthanized shortly after the Distaff.

Her injuries career-ending, Fleet Indian was retired with a record of 19: 13–0–1 and earnings of $1,704,513.

Fleet Indian was named the 2006 American Champion Older Dirt Female Horse for her racing efforts in 2006.

== Retirement ==
=== Recovery ===
Fleet Indian was originally supposed to be sold at auction as a broodmare prospect at either Keeneland's November Breeding Stock Sale, but her injury kept her out of the sale. Her injury proved to be worse than initially thought; veterinarians discovered that she had also suffered an injury to her cannon bone. After her second surgery to repair the cannon bone, Fleet Indian's recovery went smoothly. While in recovery, Fleet Indian was bred to champion sire Storm Cat.

=== Broodmare career ===
Fleet Indian was offered at the 2007 Keeneland November Breeding Stock Sale in foal with a colt by Storm Cat. The now six-year-old mare failed to reach her reserve price, $3.9 million. She was sold privately to Summer Wind Farm after the sale.

Fleet Indian produced four foals during her career as a broodmare:

- Fleet of Gold (2011 filly by Medaglia d'Oro)- Stakes-placed earner of $106,892
- Storm N Indian (2008 colt by Storm Cat)- Earner of $8,940, failed to win in two starts. Now an eventing horse.
- Fleeting Smile (2010 filly by Distorted Humor)- Sent to race in Great Britain, two-time winner with earnings of £22,469.
- Indyan Giving (2009 filly by A.P. Indy)- Unraced. Dam of Game Winner (Breeders' Cup Juvenile, Del Mar Futurity, American Pharoah Stakes)

== Death ==
Fleet Indian was euthanized on the night of October 1, 2011, due to complications from colic. The mare had been sent to Rood and Riddle Hospital a few days prior.

== Honors ==
In addition to being named an Eclipse Champion, a four-year college scholarship was awarded in Fleet Indian's name. Through the Race for Education program, the scholarship was awarded to a child of a worker in the racing industry.

Saratoga Race Course honored the mare by naming a race in her honor, the Fleet Indian Stakes. Run at 1 1/16 miles on dirt, the restricted race is for New York-bred sophomore fillies.

The inaugural running of the race was held on August 1, 2007, on what was named "Fleet Indian Day", a day created to promote the scholarship, which was also awarded to its winner that day.
