= National Stallion Stakes (filly division) =

- Class: Discontinued stakes
- Location: Belmont Park, Elmont, New York, United States
- Inaugurated: 1948
- Race type: Thoroughbred – Flat racing

Race information
- Distance: 5.5 furlongs
- Surface: Dirt
- Track: left-handed
- Qualification: Two-year-old fillies

The National Stallion Stakes was an American Thoroughbred horse race for two-year-old fillies held annually for the twenty-four years between 1948 through 1971. It was created as a counterpart to the National Stallion Stakes which was first run in 1898 at Morris Park Racecourse and was open to horses of either sex until 1948 when it became a race exclusively for colts and geldings. Contested on dirt at a distance of five and one half furlongs, the filly division was hosted by Belmont Park in Elmont, New York except for 1963 through 1967 when it was run at Aqueduct Racetrack in South Ozone Park, Queens, New York.

The race was restricted to fillies whose sire had been nominated for the race by its owner before the end of the foal's birth year.

== Historical notes ==
The inaugural running of the fillies division took place on June 5, 1948. It was won by Green Baize owned by Walter M. Jeffords Sr. and ridden by future Hall of Fame jockey Eddie Arcaro.

Bowl of Flowers won the 1960 edition while setting a new track record of 1:04 1/5 for five and one-half furlongs on dirt.

=== Filly winners 1898–1947 ===
In what would be the last year for racing at Morris Park Racecourse, in 1904 Tanya became the first filly to win the National Stallion Stakes during the time it was open to horses of either sex. Tanya went on to become just the second filly to ever win the Belmont Stakes, an American Classic that would eventually be the third leg of the U.S. Triple Crown series. It would be thirty-four years until another filly was victorious in the National Stallion Stakes when New York City restaurateur Henry Lustig's Donita M won the 1938 race. Five years later Henry Lustig would own the third filly to capture the race when in 1943 his Mrs. Ames defeated the gelding Stir Up owned by the powerful Greentree Stable. Sonny Whitney's Enfilade in 1945 was the last filly to win the National Stallion Stakes before the separate division was created.

=== Owners who won both divisions in the same year ===
1961: Christopher Chenery's Meadow Stable won the filly division with their future Hall of Fame inductee Cicada and the colts division with Sir Gaylord.

1964: Wheatley Stable, owned by Gladys Mills Phipps and her brother Ogden L. Mills, won the colts division with Bold Lad and the filly division with Queen Empress.

1971: Calumet Farm won the filly division with Rondeau and the colt division with Plum Bold in what would prove to be the final running of the National Stallion races.

== Records ==
Speed record:

- 1:04.20 @ 5.5 furlongs: Gallant Bloom & Box The Compass (1968)
- 0:56.40 @ 5 furlongs: Poly Hi (1957)

Most wins by a jockey:

- 3 – Eric Guerin (1949, 1952, 1957, 1959)

Most wins by a trainer:

- 4 – William C. Winfrey (1949, 1952, 1963, 1964)

Most wins by an owner:

- 4 – Wheatley Stable (1954, 1958, 1963, 1964)

== Winners ==
Year	Winner	Age	Jockey	Trainer	Owner	Dist. (furlongs)	Time	Win$
1971	Rondeau	2	Chuck Baltazar	Reggie Cornell	Calumet Farm	5.5 F	1:05.80	$19,335
1970	Unity Hall	2	John L. Rotz	Henry S. Clark	Christiana Stables	5.5 F	1:05.00	$20,150
1969	Box The Compass	2	Jacinto Vásquez	Thomas J. Kelly	Brookmeade Stable	5.5 F	1:04.20	$20,078
1968	Gallant Bloom	2	John L. Rotz	Max Hirsch	King Ranch	5.5 F	1:04.20	$18,749
1967	Gay Matelda	2	Anthony DeSpirito	Casey Hayes	Meadow Stable	5.5 F	1:04.60	$19,366
1966	Lady Brilliance	2	John L. Rotz	William A. Larue	Leonard P. Sasso	5.5 F	1:05.20	$20,946
1965	Another Love	2	Larry Adams	George T. Poole	Calumet Farm	5.5 F	1:05.40	$20,046
1964	Queen Empress	2	Braulio Baeza	William C. Winfrey	Wheatley Stable	5.5 F	1:05.80	$17,186
1963	Beautiful Day	2	Hedley Woodhouse	William C. Winfrey	Wheatley Stable	5.5 F	1:04.80	$18,024
1962	Affectionately	2	Braulio Baeza	Hirsch Jacobs	Ethel D. Jacobs	5.5 F	1:05.20	$19,779
1961	Cicada	2	Ismael Valenzuela	Casey Hayes	Meadow Stable	5.5 F	1:05.40	$20,001
1960	Bowl of Flowers	2	Manuel Ycaza	J. Elliott Burch	Brookmeade Stable	5.5 F	1:04.20	$20,097
1959	Great Shakes	2	Eric Guerin	Allen R. Hultz	Hal Price Headley	5 F	0:59.20	$18,803
1958	Lady Be Good	2	Ted Atkinson	James E. Fitzsimmons	Wheatley Stable	5 F	0:57.40	$19,843
1957	Poly Hi	2	Eric Guerin	George M. Odom	Mrs. George Zauderer	5 F	0:56.40	$20,055
1956	Snow White	2	Eddie Arcaro	Sylvester E. Veitch	Cornelius Vanderbilt Whitney	5 F	0:57.40	$24,935
1955	Doubledogdare	2	Jack Westrope	Moody Jolley	Claiborne Farm	5 F	0:57.60	$19,130
1954	High Voltage	2	Jimmy Nichols	James E. Fitzsimmons	Wheatley Stable	5 F	0:57.20	$20,710
1953	Evening Out	2	Ovie Scurlock	Winbert F. Mulholland	Jesse S. Widener	5 F	0:56.60	$18,490
1952	Home-Made	2	Eric Guerin	William C. Winfrey	Alfred G. Vanderbilt Jr.	5 F	0:59.20	$18,410
1951	Cigar Maid	2	Benny Green	Walter A. Kelley	Jack W. Schiffer	5 F	0:57.60	$15,070
1950	Sungari	2	George Hettinger	Winbert F. Mulholland	George D. Widener Jr.	5 F	0:56.60	$16,590
1949	Bed O' Roses	2	Eric Guerin	William C. Winfrey	Alfred G. Vanderbilt Jr.	5 F	0:59.40	$15,250
1948	Green Baize	2	Eddie Arcaro	Oscar White	Walter M. Jeffords Sr.	5 F	0:58.40	$15,070
