= Delaware Handicap =

- Class: Grade 3
- Location: Delaware Park Racetrack; Wilmington, Delaware, United States
- Inaugurated: 1937
- Race type: Thoroughbred – Flat racing
- Website: www.delawarepark.com

Race information
- Distance: 1 1/8 Miles (9 Furlongs)
- Surface: Dirt
- Track: left-handed
- Qualification: Fillies, Three-years-old and up
- Weight: Handicap
- Purse: US$400,000

The Delaware Handicap is an American Thoroughbred horse race run annually at Delaware Park Racetrack in Wilmington, Delaware. The Grade III race is open to fillies and mares, age three and up, willing to race one mile and one eighth on the dirt.

The race was inaugurated as the New Castle Handicap as part of the racing schedule with the 1937 opening of Delaware Park Racetrack. In 1939, Shangay Lily won the race as a seven year old, and to date remains the oldest winner of the race. In 1953, the $100,000 purse offered by the New Castle Handicap made it the richest race in the world for fillies and mares at the time. In 1955 the race was renamed the Delaware Handicap.

The race was held at Saratoga from 1982 until 1985.

In 2017, champion filly Songbird won as the shortest-priced favorite in the race's history at 1-9 odds.

In 2023, Delaware Park management announced that the race would be shortened to 1 3/16 miles, citing difficulties in attracting top fillies and mares to run the 1 1/4-mile distance. Two years later, following the race's downgrading from Grade II to Grade III, management announced that the race would be further shortened to 1 1/8 miles and moved to September. The race's fall positioning allows it to serve as a potential prep race for the year-end Breeders' Cup.

== Records ==
Speed record:

- 1:59.80 – Coup de Fusil (1987) (At former distance of 1 1/4 miles)

Most wins by a horse

- 2 – Endine (1958, 1959)
- 2 – Obeah (1969, 1970)
- 2 – Blessing Angelica (1971, 1972)
- 2 – Susan's Girl (1973, 1975)
- 2 – Nastique (1988, 1989)
- 2 – Royal Delta (2012, 2013)
- 2 – Elate (2018, 2019)
- 2 - Regaled (2025, 2026)

Most wins by an owner:

- 4 – Christiana Stable (1958, 1959, 1969, 1970)

Most wins by a jockey:

- 4 – Ángel Cordero Jr. (1968, 1974, 1981, 1987)
- 4 - José Ortiz (2014, 2018, 2019, 2024)

Most wins by a trainer:

- 4 – Henry S. Clark (1958, 1959, 1969, 1970)
- 4 – Todd A. Pletcher (2001, 2006, 2007, 2010)
- 4 – William I. Mott (2012, 2013, 2018, 2019)

== Winners ==
Year	Winner	Age	Jockey	Trainer	Owner	Dist. (Miles)	Time	Gr.
2026	Regaled	5	Joseph D. Ramos	D. Whitworth Beckman	Ribble Farms, Hoolie Racing Stable and Kamp Racing Stables	1-1/8 m	1:50.48	G3
2025	Regaled	4	Joseph D. Ramos	D. Whitworth Beckman	Ribble Farms and Front Page Equestrian, LLC	1-1/8 m	1:50.94	G3
2024	Honor D Lady	4	José Ortiz	Saffie Joseph Jr.	Final Furlong Farm and Madaket Stables, LLC	1-3/16 m	1:59.86	G2
2023	Idiomatic	4	Florent Geroux	Brad Cox	Juddmonte	1-3/16 m	1:56.41	G2
2022	Miss Leslie	4	Angel Cruz	Claudio A. Gon	BB Horses	1-1/4 m	2:04.50	G2
2021	Miss Marissa	4	Daniel Centeno	James Ryerson	Cammarota Racing LLC	1-1/4 m	2:04.50	G2
2020	Dunbar Road	4	Irad Ortiz Jr.	Chad Brown	Peter M. Brant	1-1/8 m	1:49.02	G2
2019	Elate	5	José Ortiz	William I. Mott	Claiborne Farm & Adele Dilschneider	1-1/4 m	2:02.51	G2
2018	Elate	4	José Ortiz	William I. Mott	Claiborne Farm & Adele Dilschneider	1-1/4 m	2:04.83	G2
2017	Songbird	4	Mike Smith	Jerry Hollendorfer	Fox Hill Farms Inc. (Rick Porter)	1-1/4 m	2:03.96	G1
2016	I'm a Chatterbox	4	Florent Geroux	J. Larry Jones	Fletcher & Carolyn Gray	1-1/4 m	2:02.64	G1
2015	Sheer Drama	5	Joe Bravo	David Fawkes	Harold L. Queen	1-1/4 m	2:01.58	G1
2014	Belle Gallantey	5	José Ortiz	Rudy R. Rodriguez	Michael Dubb, Bethlehem Stables LLC (Michael Caruso), Gary Aisquith	1-1/4 m	2:01.15	G1
2013	Royal Delta	5	Mike Smith	William I. Mott	Besilu Stables	1-1/4 m	2:02.04	G1
2012	Royal Delta	4	Mike Smith	William I. Mott	Besilu Stables	1-1/4 m	2:03.51	G2
2011	Blind Luck	4	Garrett Gomez	Jerry Hollendorfer	Mark Dedomenico, John Carver, Peter Abruzzo, Jerry Hollendorfer	1-1/4 m	2:01.28	G2
2010	Life at Ten	5	John R. Velazquez	Todd Pletcher	Candy DeBartolo	1-1/4 m	2:03.21	G2
2009	Swift Temper	5	Alan Garcia	Dale L. Romans	Mark H. Stanley	1-1/4 m	2:03.41	G2
2008	Hystericalady	5	Garrett Gomez	Jerry Hollendorfer	Rancho San Miguel et al.	1-1/4 m	2:02.37	G2
2007	Unbridled Belle	4	Ramon Domínguez	Todd A. Pletcher	Team Valor Stables LLC	1-1/4 m	2:01.16	G2
2006	Fleet Indian	5	José A. Santos	Todd A. Pletcher	Paul H. Saylor	1-1/4 m	2:02.08	G2
2005	Island Sand	4	Jerry D. Bailey	J. Larry Jones	B. A. Man Stable (James Osborne)	1-1/4 m	2:02.89	G2
2004	Summer Wind Dancer	4	Victor Espinoza	Jeff Mullins	Richard & Yvette Wira, Linda Vetter	1-1/4 m	2:03.63	G2
2003	Wild Spirit	4	Jerry D. Bailey	Robert J. Frankel	Sumaya U.S. Stables (Oussama Aboughazale)	1-1/4 m	2:02.95	G2
2002	Summer Colony	4	John R. Velazquez	Mark A. Hennig	Edward P. Evans	1-1/4 m	2:04.52	G3
2001	Irving's Baby	4	Ramon Domínguez	Todd A. Pletcher	Anstu Stables, Inc.	1-1/4 m	2:05.21	G3
2000	Lu Ravi	5	Pat Day	Carl E. Bowman	Yoshio Fujita	1-1/4 m	2:02.21	G3
1999	Tap to Music	4	Pat Day	Joseph Orseno	Stronach Stables	1-1/4 m	2:02.15	G3
1998	Amarillo	4	Julie Krone	John H. Forbes	Phantom House Farm (racing partnership, John Forbes, Jr. director)	1-1/4 m	2:04.20	G3
1997	Power Play	5	Larry Reynolds	H. Graham Motion	Robert A. Leonard	1-1/4 m	2:03.40	G3
1996	Urbane	4	Alex Solis	Randy K. Bradshaw	Samantha Siegel	1-1/4 m	2:01.80	G3
1995	Night Fax	4	Jeff Carle	William H. Turner Jr.	Audley Farm Stable	1-1/4 m	2:02.80	G2
1994	With A Wink	4	Richard Migliore	D. Wayne Lukas	Melvin Hatley	1-1/4 m	2:03.20	G2
1993	Green Darlin	4	Mike Luzzi	Lawrence E. Murray	Sondra D. Bender	1-1/4 m	2:03.60	G2
1992	Brilliant Brass	5	Edgar Prado	Carlos A. Garcia	Elaine L. Bassford	1-1/4 m	2:03.00	G2
1991	Crowned	4	Rick Wilson	Benjamin W. Perkins Jr.	Bohemia Stable	1-1/4 m	2:04.00	G2
1990	Seattle Dawn	4	Robert Colton	Michael Dickinson	Dinwiddie Farm (Stewart Bainum)	1-1/4 m	2:03.00	G2
1989	Nastique	5	Eddie Maple	Stephen L. DiMauro	Chaus Stable (Bernard Chaus)	1-1/4 m	2:01.20	G1
1988	Nastique	4	Eddie Maple	Stephen L. DiMauro	Chaus Stable (Bernard Chaus)	1-1/4 m	2:07.60	G1
1987	Coup de Fusil	5	Ángel Cordero Jr.	Jan H. Nerud	Tartan Stable	1-1/4 m	1:59.80	G1
1986	Shocker T.	4	Gene St. Leon	George Gianos	Thomasina Caporella	1-1/4 m	2:02.20	G1
1985	Basie	4	Jean Cruguet	Flint S. Schulhofer	Frances A. Genter	1-1/4 m	2:02.00	G1
1984	Adored	4	Laffit Pincay Jr.	Laz Barrera	Ethel D. Jacobs	1-1/4 m	2:03.20	G1
1983	May Day Eighty	4	Jacinto Vásquez	David A. Whiteley	Calumet Farm	1-1/4 m	2:03.20	G1
1982	Jameela	6	Jack Kaenel	Hyman Ravich	Peter M. Brant	1-1/4 m	2:02.60	G1
1981	Relaxing	5	Ángel Cordero Jr.	Angel Penna Sr.	Ogden Phipps	1-1/4 m	2:01.00	G1
1980	Heavenly Ade	4	Jerry D. Bailey	Mary Edens	Adele W. Paxson	1-1/4 m	2:00.00	G1
1979	Likely Exchange	5	Mark S. Sellers	Thomas H. Stevens	G. Watts Humphrey Jr.	1-1/4 m	2:03.40	G1
1978	Late Bloomer	4	Jorge Velásquez	John M. Gaver Jr.	Greentree Stable	1-1/4 m	2:02.20	G1
1977	Our Mims	3	Jorge Velásquez	John M. Veitch	Calumet Farm	1-1/4 m	2:01.00	G1
1976	Optimistic Gal	3	Eddie Maple	LeRoy Jolley	Diana M. Firestone	1-1/4 m	2:01.00	G1
1975	Susan's Girl	6	Ray Broussard	Ross Finstermaker	Fred W. Hooper	1-1/4 m	2:01.80	G1
1974	Krislin	5	Ángel Cordero Jr.	Stephen A. DiMauro	Harold I. Snyder	1-1/4 m	2:01.60	G1
1973	Susan's Girl	4	Laffit Pincay Jr.	John W. Russell	Fred W. Hooper	1-1/4 m	2:01.80	G1
1972	Blessing Angelica	4	Eddie Belmonte	H. Allen Jerkens	Hobeau Farm	1-1/4 m	2:00.60	
1971	Blessing Angelica	3	Jacinto Vásquez	H. Allen Jerkens	Hobeau Farm	1-1/4 m	2:03.40	
1970	Obeah	5	Leroy Moyers	Henry S. Clark	Christiana Stables	1-1/4 m	2:02.60	
1969	Obeah	4	John L. Rotz	Henry S. Clark	Christiana Stables	1-1/4 m	2:04.20	
1968	Politely	5	Ángel Cordero Jr.	George M. Baker	Bohemia Stable	1-1/4 m	2:02.80	
1967	Straight Deal II	5	Bobby Ussery	Hirsch Jacobs	Ethel D. Jacobs	1-1/4 m	2:02.20	
1966	Open Fire	5	Frank Lovato	Virgil W. Raines	Brandywine Stable	1-1/4 m	2:00.40	
1965	Steeple Jill	4	John Ruane	Bert Mulholland	George D. Widener Jr.	1-1/4 m	2:02.80	
1964	Old Hat	5	Buck Thornburg	Charles C. Norman	Stanley Conrad	1-1/4 m	2:04.00	
1963	Waltz Song	5	Sheridan Mellon	Thomas F. White	Thomas F. White	1-1/4 m	2:04.00	
1962	Seven Thirty	4	Larry Adams	Bert Mulholland	George D. Widener Jr.	1-1/4 m	2:02.60	
1961	Airmans Guide	4	Howard Grant	Bert B. Williams	Hugh A. Grant	1-1/4 m	2:02.40	
1960	Quill	4	Bobby Ussery	Lucien Laurin	Reginald N. Webster	1-1/4 m	2:02.40	
1959	Endine	5	Paul J. Bailey	Henry S. Clark	Christiana Stable	1-1/4 m	2:03.60	
1958	Endine	4	Eldon Nelson	Henry S. Clark	Christiana Stable	1-1/4 m	2:03.00	
1957	Princess Turia	4	Bill Hartack	Horace A. Jones	Calumet Farm	1-1/4 m	2:05.00	
1956	Flower Bowl	4	Logan Batcheller	Preston M. Burch	Brookmeade Stable	1-1/4 m	2:03.00	
1955	Parlo	4	Eric Guerin	Richard E. Handlen	Foxcatcher Farms	1-1/4 m	2:02.40	
1954	Gainsboro Girl	4	Augustine Catalano	Walter D. Carroll	Shawmut Farm (Richard A. Jenks)	1-1/4 m	2:02.60	
1953	Grecian Queen	3	Ted Atkinson	James P. Conway	Florence Whitaker	1-1/4 m	2:02.80	
1952	Kiss Me Kate	4	Ronnie Nash	Oscar White	Walter M. Jeffords	1-1/4 m	2:02.60	
1951	Busanda	4	Eric Guerin	Bart Sweeny	Ogden Phipps	1-1/4 m	2:04.60	
1950	Adile	4	John Gilbert	Oscar White	Walter M. Jeffords	1-1/16 m	1:44.60	
1949	Allie's Pal	4	Robert J. Martin	Morrie Sidell	Samuel D. Sidell	1-1/16 m	1:46.40	
1948	Miss Grillo	6	Ira Hanford	Horatio Luro	Mill River Stable	1-1/16 m	1:49.00	
1947	Elpis	5	Arthur F. Skelton	Larney Hansman	William G. Helis	1-1/16 m	1:46.60	
1946	Bridal Flower	3	Abelardo DeLara	James W. Smith	John R. Bradley	1-1/16 m	1:43.80	
1945	Plucky Maud	4	Robert Permane	Oleg Dubassoff	Lazy F Ranch	1-1/16 m	1:42.60	
1944	Everget	3	Arnold Kirkland	Virgil W. Raines	Brandywine Stable	1-1/16 m	1:44.80	
1943	Race not held due to wartime restrictions							
1942	Monida	5	Abelardo DeLara	William S. Cotton	Constance Morabito	1-1/16 m	1:45.60	
1941	Dotted Swiss	4	Maurice Peters	Max Hirsch	W. Arnold Hanger	1-1/16 m	1:49.00	
1940	Tedbriar	3	Jimmy Lynch	John Porter Jones	William H. Lipscomb	1-1/16 m	1:43.80	
1939	Shangay Lily	7	Ruperto Donoso	John L. Roberts	William V. McGrath	1-1/16 m	n/a	
1938	Marica	5	Robert Dotter	Howard Wells	Thomas D. Taggart	1-1/16 m	1:45.60	
1937	Rosenna	3	Maurice Peters	Richard E. Handlen	William du Pont Jr.	1-1/16 m	1:43.80	
