= Regal Gleam =

American-bred Thoroughbred racehorse

- Sire: Hail To Reason
- Grandsire: Turn-To
- Dam: Miz Carol
- Damsire: Stymie
- Sex: Mare
- Foaled: 1964
- Country: United States
- Colour: Dark Bay/Brown
- Breeder: Bieber-Jacobs Stable
- Owner: Patrice Jacobs
- Trainer: Hirsch Jacobs
- Record: 32: 8-2-4
- Earnings: US$246,793

Major wins
- Blue Hen Stakes (1966); Frizette Stakes (1966); Selima Stakes (1966); Silver Blaze Purse (1967)

Awards
- American Champion Two-Year-Old Filly (1966)

Regal Gleam (March 17, 1964 – April 13, 1976) was an American Thoroughbred racehorse who was voted 1966 American Champion Two-Year-Old Filly honors.

== Background ==
She was bred by Isidore Bieber and her trainer, U.S. Racing Hall of Fame inductee Hirsch Jacobs. She was owned by Jacobs' daughter, Patrice.

== Racing career ==
In her Championship year, Regal Gleam won the Blue Hen Stakes at Delaware Park Racetrack, the Frizette Stakes at Aqueduct Racetrack, and the Selima Stakes at Laurel Park Racecourse.

At age three, Regal Gleam had an unsuccessful racing campaign, losing her first seven starts and going the year without a stakes race win. Of her nineteen starts in 1967, she won only three minor races and was retired to broodmare duty.

== Breeding record ==
Regal Gleam was purchased by Claiborne Farm of Paris, Kentucky, an American horse breeding operation. She was bred to stallions such as Buckpasser, Tom Rolfe and Round Table, the latter mating producing the colt, Royal Glint.

Regal Gleam died at age twelve on April 13, 1976, at Claiborne Farm after complications from colic surgery.

== Pedigree ==
Pedigree of Regal Gleam
Sire Hail To Reason	Turn-To	Royal Charger	Nearco
Sire Hail To Reason	Turn-To	Royal Charger	Sun Princess
Sire Hail To Reason	Turn-To	Source Sucree	Admiral Drake
Sire Hail To Reason	Turn-To	Source Sucree	Lavendula
Sire Hail To Reason	Nothirdchance	Blue Swords	Blue Larkspur
Sire Hail To Reason	Nothirdchance	Blue Swords	Flaming Swords
Sire Hail To Reason	Nothirdchance	Gala Colors	Sir Gallahad III
Sire Hail To Reason	Nothirdchance	Gala Colors	Rouge et Noir
Dam Miz Carol	Stymie	Equestrian	Equipoise
Dam Miz Carol	Stymie	Equestrian	Frilette
Dam Miz Carol	Stymie	Stop Watch	On Watch
Dam Miz Carol	Stymie	Stop Watch	Sunset Gun
Dam Miz Carol	No Fiddling	King Cole	Pharamond
Dam Miz Carol	No Fiddling	King Cole	Golden Melody
Dam Miz Carol	No Fiddling	Big Hurry	Black Toney
Dam Miz Carol	No Fiddling	Big Hurry	La Troienne
