= Henry S. Clark =

American horse trainer (1904–1999)

Personal information
- Born: January 19, 1904 United States
- Died: February 6, 1999 (aged 95)
- Resting place: Saint Joseph Cemetery, Texas, Baltimore County, MD
- Occupation: Trainer

Horse racing career
- Sport: Horse racing
- Career wins: Not found

Major racing wins
- Chesapeake Stakes (1947); Delaware Oaks (1947, 1972); Molly Pitcher Handicap (1948, 1973); Pimlico Futurity (1954); Lawrence Realization Stakes (1955); Travers Stakes (1955); Merchants and Citizens Handicap (1956); Saranac Handicap (1956); Stymie Handicap (1956); American Legion Handicap (1957); Jeanne d 'Arc Stakes (1957); Alabama Stakes (1958); Delaware Handicap (1958, 1959, 1969, 1970); Maskette Handicap (1958, 1960, 1973); Beldame Stakes (1959); Diana Handicap (1959, 1960); Ladies Handicap (1959); Belmont Futurity Stakes (1961); Dwyer Stakes (1962); Manhattan Handicap (1963); Massachusetts Handicap (1964, 1965); Blue Hen Stakes (1967, 1970); Vineland Handicap (1969); Firenze Handicap (1970); National Stallion Stakes (filly division) (1970); Hempstead Handicap (1973); Forerunner Stakes (1981); Black Gold Stakes (1982); Louisiana Derby Trial Stakes (1982); Lecomte Stakes (1982); Blue Grass Stakes (1982)

Honors
- United States Racing Hall of Fame (1982); Delaware Park Wall of Fame (2007); Henry S. Clark Stakes at Pimlico

Significant horses
- Tempted, Thinking Cap Obeah, Endine, Linkage, Cyane
- Updated on July 13, 2007

Henry S. Clark Jr. (January 19, 1904 – February 6, 1999) was an American Hall of Fame horse trainer. In 2007, Henry Clark was part of the inaugural class inducted into Delaware Park Racetrack's Wall of Fame.

Henry Clark was the grandson of William Jennings Sr. who bred, raced and trained Dunboyne to win the 1887 Preakness Stakes.

Clark began his professional career in 1929 and got his first stakes winner with Liz Whitney Tippett's colt, Blue Cypress. He worked well into his nineties and holds the record for most wins by a trainer in the Delaware Handicap with four.
