= Royal Delta =

American-bred Thoroughbred racehorse

- Sire: Empire Maker
- Grandsire: Unbridled
- Dam: Delta Princess
- Damsire: A.P. Indy
- Sex: Mare
- Foaled: February 2, 2008
- Died: February 10, 2017 (aged 9)
- Country: United States
- Colour: Dark bay
- Breeder: Palides Investments N.V., Inc.
- Owner: Palides Investments (2010–2011); Besilu Stables
- Trainer: Bill Mott
- Record: 22: 12-5-1
- Earnings: $4,811,126

Major wins
- Black-Eyed Susan Stakes (2011); Alabama Stakes (2011); Fleur de Lis Handicap (2012); Delaware Handicap (2012, 2013); Beldame Stakes (2012); Sabin Stakes (2013); Personal Ensign Handicap (2013) Breeders' Cup wins: Breeders' Cup Ladies' Classic (2011, 2012)

Awards
- American Champion Three-Year-Old Filly (2011); American Champion Older Female Horse (2012, 2013)

Honors
- U.S. Racing Hall of Fame (2019); Royal Delta Stakes at Gulfstream Park

Royal Delta (February 2, 2008 – February 10, 2017) was a Champion American Thoroughbred racehorse. The daughter of Empire Maker was best known for winning back-to-back editions of the Breeders' Cup Ladies Classic (later renamed the Breeders' Cup Distaff) and three consecutive Eclipse Awards (as American Champion Three-Year-Old Filly of 2011 and American Champion Older Female Horse of both 2012 and 2013). She won the Grade I Alabama, Beldame, Delaware and Personal Ensign Stakes in addition to her Breeders' Cup triumphs.

On February 10, 2017, it was announced that she had died due to foaling complications.

On April 22, 2019, Royal Delta was voted into the National Museum of Racing Hall of Fame.

== Background ==
Royal Delta was a dark bay mare with a white star and a white sock on her left hind leg. She was bred in Kentucky by Prince Saud bin Khaled's Palides Investments. She was sired by Empire Maker, who had won the 2003 Belmont Stakes. Prior to Royal Delta, Empire Maker's most successful offspring was Pioneerof the Nile, who placed second in the Kentucky Derby and became the sire of Triple Crown winner American Pharoah. Royal Delta was from Empire Maker's fourth crop and started racing shortly after her sire was exported to Japan.

Royal Delta's dam was Delta Princess, a stakes winning mare by A.P. Indy. Ron Wallace, general manager of Palides, explained the difference between mother and daughter in a 2011 interview: "(Delta Princess) is tough; she's a lot more competitive than Royal Delta. But Royal Delta is way more athletic and she hasn't even quite figured it all out. She is going to be incredible as a 4-year-old. She was laid back in the paddock (before racing in the 2011 Ladies' Classic). Here (at the Keeneland Sales), she's a star, but she doesn't care. Her mother would eat horses alive in front of her; she was going to win no matter what. Royal Delta is just good (because of her natural ability). If she learns to be competitive, watch out."

Royal Delta initially raced as a homebred for Palides Investments. Prince Saud bin Khaled died in 2011, and Royal Delta was sold at a dispersal sale to Besilu Stables.

Royal Delta stood 16.2 hands (66 inches, 168 cm) high at the withers. She was trained throughout her career by Bill Mott, who described her as determined and willful. Although a high energy horse, she usually maintained a level attitude on the racetrack. She had a large appetite and was known around the stable simply as "Royal".

== Racing career ==
Royal Delta made her debut in a one-mile maiden special weight race on October 30, 2010, at Belmont Park, which she won by 12 lengths.

=== 2011: Three-year-old campaign ===
After a lengthy layoff, Royal Delta returned to racing in the Suncoast Stakes on March 12, 2011, at Tampa Bay Downs, finishing ninth. She next shipped to Keeneland on April 15, where she won an allowance race on the synthetic dirt surface by three lengths. She was under consideration for the Kentucky Oaks but did not draw into the field due to a lack of graded stakes earnings. Instead, she was entered in the Black-Eyed Susan Stakes at Pimlico Racetrack on May 20. Royal Delta was the third choice at 3–1 on the morning line in a strong field of six stakes winners, but she went off as the co-favorite at 9–5. When the gates opened, she veered inside and settled immediately to be one of the trailers. On the clubhouse turn, she moved into a stalker's position about four lengths back in fifth place. Around the final turn, her jockey, Jose Lezcano, took the inside path and passed two horses. At the top of the stretch, Royal Delta passed morning line favorite Wyomia, then ran down leader Hot Summer, and moved to a three-length lead. Approaching the wire, Buster's Ready made a rush at her, but Royal Delta held on to win by 2 1/2 lengths.

Royal Delta was next expected to run in the Grade I Mother Goose but missed the race due to a bruised hoof. On July 23, she returned in the Coaching Club American Oaks where she finished third behind It's Tricky and Kentucky Oaks winner Plum Pretty. On August 20, Royal Delta scored a five and a half length victory in the $500,000 Alabama Stakes, avenging her loss to Plum Pretty and It's Tricky from a month earlier. She finished the mile and a quarter race (10 furlongs) in 2:03.13 for her first Grade I win. "I tried to make her relax today," said Lezcano. "Last time she was a little rank, she fought with the bit. But today, I let her break and run the first quarter, and after that I took a little hold and she got very relaxed. I asked her at the quarter pole and took her out, and she gave me a big kick. She really took off."

After the Alabama Stakes, rather than face her own division again, Royal Delta contested the Grade I Beldame Stakes on October 1 at Belmont Park against older fillies and mares including eventual American Horse of the Year Havre de Grace. After racing close to the lead, she held a clear second in the slop while proving no match for Havre de Grace, who drew off to win by nine lengths.

On November 4, Royal Delta entered the Breeders' Cup Ladies' Classic at Churchill Downs as the slight favorite over nine opponents. (Havre de Grace had elected to run in the Breeders' Cup Classic.) Plum Pretty set a slow early pace and was challenged at the top of the stretch by It's Tricky. Royal Delta closed ground from the middle of the track and pulled away near the finish line to win by 2 1/2 lengths over It's Tricky. "I thought it (the pace) was a little slow but I think it is a testament to her ability and her tremendous turn of foot to close on that kind of pace," said Mott.

The performance cemented her status as the top sophomore filly in the country. She was named the American Champion Three-Year-Old Filly, earning 243 out of 248 votes in the Eclipse Award balloting.

In late November, she was sold at the Keeneland auction for $8.5 million to Benjamin Leon's Besilu Stables. That price was, at the time, the third highest ever paid at auction for a racing or broodmare prospect, behind Ashado and Better Than Honour, who sold for $9 million and $14 million respectively. Leon outdueled Adena Springs owner Frank Stronach and said afterwards that he would return Royal Delta to the races in 2012 at age four.

=== 2012: Four-year-old season ===
Royal Delta started her four-year-old campaign on February 25, 2012, placing second to Awesome Maria in the $100,000 Grade III Sabin Stakes at Gulfstream Park. It was announced that she would be pointed to the world's richest race, the $10,000,000 Dubai World Cup, the inaugural running of which trainer Bill Mott won in 1996 with Cigar. In the 2012 World Cup on March 31, Royal Delta was impeded and bumped near the start and then was hampered coming around the final turn and finished ninth in the field of 14, 7 3/4 lengths behind the winner. "In the middle of the turn, the horse in front of me quit, so I had to wait a little longer than I wanted to," said Lezcano. "She gave me a good run at the end." Along with several other American horses at the meet, she had trouble handing the "sticky" artificial dirt surface.

On June 16, Royal Delta was the highweight in the $150,000 Grade II Fleur de Lis Handicap at Churchill Downs and won by eight lengths. She beat Afleeting Lady and Kentucky Oaks runner-up St. John's River, who finished second and third respectively in the field of six. On July 21, Royal Delta won the $750,000 Delaware Handicap at Delaware Park by a neck over Delaware Park specialist Tiz Miz Sue. She also avenged her loss earlier in the year to rival Awesome Maria, who finished six lengths back in third in the field of eight. "She proved to be the best," said Mott. "She was game in victory. She did a lot of work around the turn and early in the stretch. She made the lead a little early, but she got it done."

On August 26, Royal Delta competed in the $600,000 Personal Ensign Stakes at Saratoga. Before the race, she became agitated and was noticeably washed out. Early in the race, she stalked the pace set by Brushed by A Star and Love and Pride, then moved into contention to challenge for the lead entering the far turn. However, rounding into the stretch, Royal Delta swung very wide, dropped back to fourth in mid-stretch, and appeared to be languishing. In deep stretch, she regained momentum and commenced another rally, but she fell short, losing by a half-length to upset 10-1 winner Love and Pride. "I'm not going to make a lot of excuses," said jockey Mike Smith. "The winner ran a bang-up race. We got outrun. If I had to do it all over again, I would have rode her a little differently and got brave early."

On September 29, Royal Delta won the grade I Beldame Stakes by 9 1/2 lengths over It's Tricky. She dueled with that rival until the head of the stretch, then passed her to win. Her connections credited a change in her pre-race routine. "The other day (in the Personal Ensign), I kept trying to keep her quiet and keep her still and I think it just agitated her more and she got hot and got hot," said Smith. "So, today when she wanted to kick on, I just let her open up and gallop, let her open up coming back. She was much better. I learned a little something; I was glad Bill brought it to my attention. If that was the difference, I'm not sure, but she was really leading up to this race for this kind of a performance... she's coming around at the right time."

On Friday, November 2, 2012, she traveled to Santa Anita Park to defend her Breeders' Cup Ladies' Classic title. In a field of nine that included five Grade I winners and two undefeated champions (Awesome Feather and My Miss Aurelia), Royal Delta was made the slight favorite over Awesome Feather. As the gates opened, she had the best break of her career and took the lead. After fractions of 22.6 and 45.8, jockey Mike Smith slowed Royal Delta and nursed her one-length lead. At the eighth pole, Include Me Out and My Miss Aurelia made bids into the stretch to try to catch the leader, but Royal Delta repelled all challengers and maintained her lead to win by 1 1/2 lengths over My Miss Aurelia. She finished the 1-1/8 mile race in 1:48.80 on a fast track. "I was a little concerned when they were throwing up those fractions, but she kept going and ran them off their feet," said Mott.

For her accomplishments in 2012, she was named American Champion Older Female Horse at the American Eclipse Awards, earning 231 of 253 votes.

=== 2013: Five-year-old season ===
Royal Delta made her 2013 debut on February 17 in the Grade III Sabin Stakes at Gulfstream Park. She won by five lengths over four opponents, including Grade I winner Grace Hall. She completed the 1 1/16-mile race in 1:43.31 on a fast main track.

Her next race was the Dubai World Cup, held on March 30 on a synthetic all-weather surface at Meydan Racecourse. She broke well and within a few strides went to the lead, which she held the around the clubhouse turn and all the way down the backstretch. Going into the final turn, she added a little distance between her and the field. As they rounded into the stretch, 2011 Kentucky Derby winner Animal Kingdom came up to challenge her and went on to win. Royal Delta faded to tenth. "My trip was good," said Smith. "She just didn't seem to care for it. Every time she had to pick it up, she struggled. After four or five passed her, we were pretty much done – then we just got home safe."

She came back to place second in the Fleur de Lis Handicap on June 15 at Churchill Downs. On July 20, she won her second Delaware Handicap by 10 1/2 lengths in a wire-to-wire performance. "Dubai you have to draw a line through, and the other day she was second, but she did not bring her 'A' race," said Mott. "But she ran great today. She was training great coming into the race. Actually, a little too good, if there is such a thing. She was wanting to work a little fast but doing it the right way."

On August 25, she won the Personal Ensign Handicap in another dominating performance. "She's a machine. Down the lane, she got to looking around the track a little bit, so I got after her just a little to keep her going," said Smith. "She's just so big. You hate for her to gear too much down and someone comes running. It's hard to get going again. Other than that, everything was wonderful." In order to ride her in the Personal Ensign, Smith gave up an opportunity to ride Game On Dude in the Pacific Classic that was held the same day in California. That horse's trainer, Bob Baffert, was philosophical about losing his preferred jockey, "...with the Mike Smith situation I knew we might have that day, knew it would come. You know, there's always a woman involved, and it was her."

In the Beldame Stakes on September 28, Royal Delta finished second to Kentucky Oaks winner Princess of Sylmar. "(Princess of Sylmar) got up to me at the quarter pole and just out-footed me to the wire today," said Smith.

Royal Delta then trained up to the Breeders' Cup Distaff (formerly the Breeders' Cup Ladies Classic), held at Santa Anita Park on November 1. Seeking her third straight win in that event, she was made the favorite in a field that included graded stakes winners Beholder, Princess of Sylmar, Close Hatches, and Authenticity. Royal Delta raced behind Authenticity for the early lead but faded when challenged around the final turn by eventual winner Beholder. "She didn't have it today," said Smith. "No spark, man. Early on, I knew it. She usually takes the race to somebody, but not today. I thought when Beholder come up to her, she would pick it up, but she didn't. I asked and I asked and nothing. I'm kind of dumbfounded."

Despite her performance in the Distaff, Royal Delta was again named Champion Older Female at the Eclipse Awards.

== Racing Record ==
Date	Race	Grade	Track	Finish
Oct 30, 2010	Maiden Special Weight	-	Belmont Park	1
Mar 12, 2011	Suncoast Stakes	-	Tampa Bay Downs	9
Apr 15, 2011	Allowance	-	Keeneland	1
May 20, 2011	Black-Eyed Susan Stakes	II	Pimlico Racetrack	1
July 23, 2011	Coaching Club American Oaks	I	Saratoga Race Course	3
Aug 20, 2011	Alabama Stakes	I	Saratoga Race Course	1
Oct 1, 2011	Beldame Stakes	I	Belmont Park	2
Nov 4, 2011	Breeders Cup Ladies Classic	I	Churchill Downs	1
Feb 25, 2012	Sabin Stakes	III	Gulfstream Park	2
Mar 31, 2012	Dubai World Cup	I	Meydan Racecourse	9
June 16, 2012	Fleur de Lis Handicap	II	Churchill Downs	1
July 21, 2012	Delaware Handicap	III	Delaware Park	1
Aug 26, 2012	Personal Ensign Stakes	I	Saratoga	2
Sep 29, 2012	Beldame Stakes	I	Belmont Park	1
Nov 2, 2012	Breeders Cup Ladies Classic	I	Santa Anita Park	1
Feb 17, 2013	Sabin Stakes	III	Gulfstream Park	1
Mar 30, 2013	Dubai World Cup	I	Meydan Racecourse	10
June 15, 2013	Fleur de Lis Handicap	II	Churchill Downs	2
July 25, 2013	Delaware Handicap	III	Delaware Park	1
Aug 25, 2013	Personal Ensign Stakes	I	Saratoga	1
Sep 28, 2013	Beldame Stakes	I	Belmont Park	2
Nov 1, 2013	Breeders Cup Distaff	I	Santa Anita Park	2

== Death ==
Royal Delta was retired to broodmare duty for the 2014 season and was sent to Ireland to be bred to leading sire Galileo. However, she did not get in foal that year and miscarried the foal that was conceived in 2015. In 2016 she was bred back to Galileo and was pronounced in foal. On February 10, 2017, it was announced that Royal Delta died due to foaling complications. Her foal, a filly by Galileo, survived and was named Delta's Royalty.

In 2015, Gulfstream Park renamed the Sabin Stakes, which Royal Delta won in 2013, in her honor.

== Pedigree ==
Royal Delta was sired by Empire Maker, who avenged his loss in the Kentucky Derby to Funny Cide with a commanding win in the 2003 Belmont Stakes. Empire Maker was one of the best performers of Kentucky Derby winner Unbridled, whose other leading offspring included important sire Unbridled's Song. Empire Maker's dam Toussaud was a Grade I winner who was named the Kentucky Broodmare of the Year after producing four Grade I winners. With his excellent race record, impressive appearance and impeccable breeding, expectations for Empire Maker at stud were extremely high. Although he proved fairly successful with his first few crops, Empire Maker was exported to Japan in 2010, shortly after his son Pioneerof the Nile finished second in the Kentucky Derby. Empire Maker later became known as a sire a classic distance winners on the dirt and was repatriated to the United States in 2015, not long after his grandson American Pharoah won the Triple Crown.

Royal Delta's dam was Delta Princess, who won six stakes races before retiring to broodmare duty at Prince Saud bin Khaled's Kentucky farm, where she produced three graded stakes horses. Delta Princess was by another Belmont Stakes winner, leading sire A.P. Indy. The combination of Empire Maker and an A.P. Indy mare created multiple crosses to La Troienne, one of the most influential broodmares of the twentieth century.

Pedigree of Royal Delta, dark bay mare, foaled February 2, 2008
Sire Empire Maker dark bay, 2000	Unbridled bay, 1987	Fappiano bay, 1977	Mr. Prospector
Sire Empire Maker dark bay, 2000	Unbridled bay, 1987	Fappiano bay, 1977	Killaloe
Sire Empire Maker dark bay, 2000	Unbridled bay, 1987	Gana Facil chestnut, 1981	Le Fabuleux
Sire Empire Maker dark bay, 2000	Unbridled bay, 1987	Gana Facil chestnut, 1981	Charedi
Sire Empire Maker dark bay, 2000	Toussaud dark bay, 1989	El Gran Senor bay, 1981	Northern Dancer
Sire Empire Maker dark bay, 2000	Toussaud dark bay, 1989	El Gran Senor bay, 1981	Sex Appeal
Sire Empire Maker dark bay, 2000	Toussaud dark bay, 1989	Image of Reality bay, 1976	In Reality
Sire Empire Maker dark bay, 2000	Toussaud dark bay, 1989	Image of Reality bay, 1976	Edee's Image
Dam Delta Princess dark bay, 1999	A.P. Indy dark bay, 1989	Seattle Slew dark bay, 1974	Bold Reasoning
Dam Delta Princess dark bay, 1999	A.P. Indy dark bay, 1989	Seattle Slew dark bay, 1974	My Charmer
Dam Delta Princess dark bay, 1999	A.P. Indy dark bay, 1989	Weekend Surprise bay, 1980	Secretariat
Dam Delta Princess dark bay, 1999	A.P. Indy dark bay, 1989	Weekend Surprise bay, 1980	Lassie Dear
Dam Delta Princess dark bay, 1999	Lyphard's Delta dark bay, 1990	Lyphard bay, 1969	Northern Dancer
Dam Delta Princess dark bay, 1999	Lyphard's Delta dark bay, 1990	Lyphard bay, 1969	Goofed
Dam Delta Princess dark bay, 1999	Lyphard's Delta dark bay, 1990	Proud Delta dark day, 1972	Delta Judge
Dam Delta Princess dark bay, 1999	Lyphard's Delta dark bay, 1990	Proud Delta dark day, 1972	Loving Sister (family 20-a)

Royal Delta was inbred 4 x 4 to Northern Dancer, meaning Northern Dancer appears twice in the fourth generation of her pedigree.
