= Saranac Stakes =

- Class: Listed
- Location: Saratoga Race Course; Saratoga Springs, New York, United States
- Inaugurated: 1901
- Race type: Thoroughbred – Flat racing

Race information
- Distance: 1 1/16 miles
- Surface: Turf
- Track: Left-handed
- Qualification: Three-year-olds
- Weight: 124 lbs. with allowances
- Purse: $150,000 (2026)

The Saranac Stakes is an American Thoroughbred horse race run annually at Saratoga Race Course in Saratoga Springs, New York. The Listed stakes event is open to three-year-old horses and is raced on turf over a distance of 1 1/16 miles. The event, currently run in July, with a purse if $150,000 in 2026.

Inaugurated in 1901, the race is named for the village of Saranac in Clinton County, New York in the Adirondack Mountains. Due to a legislated ban on parimutuel betting, all New York State racetracks ceased operations in 1911 and 1912. Cancellation of the race occurred again from 1943 to 1947 as a result of World War II. When it returned in 1948, the race was shifted to the now defunct Jamaica Racetrack until 1956 when it was moved to Aqueduct Racetrack where it was held from 1957 to 1961, 1963–1967, 1972–1974, and in 1976.

In 2025 the event was downgraded by the Thoroughbred Owners and Breeders Association to Listed status.

Raced on dirt until 1979, over the years the Saranac Stakes has been run at various distances:

- 1 mile: 1960–1965, 2020
- 1 1/16 miles: 1948–1959, 2019, 2021–Present
- 1 1/8 miles: 1901–1908, 1910, 1996, 2011–2018
- 1 3/16 miles: 1997–2010

== Records ==
Most wins by an owner:

- 5 – Greentree Stable (1923, 1957, 1963, 1968, 1978)

Most wins by a jockey:

- 7 – Eddie Maple (1972, 1975, 1981, 1983, 1986, 1987, 1992)

Most wins by an trainer:

- 5 – Woody Stephens (1975, 1981, 1983, 1986, 1988)

== Winners of the Saranac Stakes since 1938 ==
Year	Winner	Jockey	Trainer	Owner	Time
2026	Heeere's Johnny	Jaime Rodriguez	Raymond Handal	Magic Carpet Racing, Catherine W. Coyle & Blue Bison Stable	1:40.45
2025	Stars and Strides	Junior Alvarado	William I. Mott	Pin Oak Stud	1:42.17
2024	West Hollywood	Flavien Prat	Brad H. Cox	Qatar Racing	1:40.89
2023	Carl Spackler (IRE)	Tyler Gaffalione	Chad C. Brown	e Five Racing Thoroughbreds	1:42.23
2022	Annapolis	Irad Ortiz Jr.	Todd A. Pletcher	Bass Racing LLC	1:42.57
2021	Public Sector	Irad Ortiz Jr.	Chad C. Brown	Klaravich Stables	1:41.78
2020	Bye Bye Melvin	John R. Velazquez	H. Graham Motion	Alex G. Campbell Jr.	1:39.92
2019	Global Access	John R. Velazquez	Michael J. Trombetta	Live Oak Plantation	1:41.80
2018	Raging Bull	Joel Rosario	Chad C. Brown	Peter M. Brant	1:47.19
2017	Voodoo Song	Jose Lezcano	Linda L. Rice	Barry K. Schwartz	1:44.41
2016	Inspector Lynley	Joel Rosario	Claude R. McGaughey III	Stuart S. Janney III & Phipps Stable	1:46.68
2015	World Approval	Joel Rosario	Mark Casse	Live Oak Plantation	1:45.39
2014	Ring Weekend	John R. Velazquez	H. Graham Motion	St. Elias Stable/West Point Thoroughbreds	1:46.48
2013	Five Iron	Luis Saez	Brian A. Lynch	Fred M. Allor	1:48.21
2012	Unbridled Command	Ramon Domínguez	Thomas M. Bush	Lakland Farm	1:46.54
2011	Brilliant Speed	John R. Velazquez	Tom Albertrani	Live Oak Plantation	1:48.73
2010	Lethal Combination	Alan Garcia	Kiaran McLaughlin	Namcook Stables	1:53.18
2009	Al Khali	Kent Desormeaux	William I. Mott	Brous Stable/Wachtel Stable	1:53.00
2008	Marlang	Richard Dos Ramos	Deborah England	Gus Schickedanz	1:53.10
2007	Mission Approved	Eibar Coa	Gary C. Contessa	William F. Coyro Jr.	1:53.81
2006	Rock Lobster	Eibar Coa	Michael W. Dickinson	Flatbird Stable	1:57.36
2005	Jambalaya	Jono Jones	Catherine Day Phillips	Catherine Day Phillips	1:54.20
2004	Prince Arch	Javier Castellano	Kenneth McPeek	Raymond H. Cottrell Sr.	1:53.89
2003	Shoal Water	John R. Velazquez	Mark Frostad	Sam-Son Farms	1:55.43
2002	Ibn Al Haitham	Richard Migliore	Kiaran McLaughlin	Sheikh Mohammed	1:55.30
2001	Blazing Fury	Javier Castellano	James J. Toner	Caesar Kimmel	1:54.88
2000	Rob's Spirit	Jerry D. Bailey	William I. Mott	E. White & M. Paulson	1:55.47
1999	Phi Beta Doc	Ramon Domínguez	Robert W. Leonard	D. Foster & R. Leonard	1:51.61
1998	Crowd Pleaser	Jean-Luc Samyn	Jonathan Sheppard	Augustin Stable	1:53.42
1997	River Squall	Craig Perret	Pete Vestal	Thomas Carey	1:52.82
1996	Harghar	Pat Day	Burk Kessinger Jr.	Turf Stables Inc.	1:48.59
1995	Debonair Dan	Jorge Chavez	Gary Sciacca	Lee Pokoik	1:33.65
1994	Casa Eire	Joe Bravo	Leo O'Brien	Bernard Connaughton	1:34.67
1993	Halissee	Julie Krone	William I. Mott	John A. Nerud	1:34.34
1992	Casino Magistrate	Eddie Maple	Thomas J. Kelly	Blue Goose Stable	1:39.37
1991	Club Champ	Ángel Cordero Jr.	Stephen Schaeffer	Robert Spiegel	1:34.20
1990	Rouse The Louse	Jerry D. Bailey	George R. Arnold Jr.	Alexander G. Campbell Jr.	1:37.00
1989	Expensive Decision *	Jean-Luc Samyn	Stanley R. Shapoff	Edward L. Shapoff	1:36.00
1989	Slew The Knight *	Jean-Luc Samyn	John O. Hertler	Philip Dileo	1:36.00
1988	Posen	Don Brumfield	Woody Stephens	Kennelot Stables	1:38.40
1987	Lights And Music	Eddie Maple	MacKenzie Miller	Rokeby Stable	1:34.80
1986	Glow	Eddie Maple	Woody Stephens	Claiborne Farm	1:34.60
1985	Equalize	Robbie Davis	Jan H. Nerud	Tartan Stable	1:39.00
1984	Is Your Pleasure	Ángel Cordero Jr.	Edward I. Kelly	Brookfield Farm	1:35.20
1983	Sabin	Eddie Maple	Woody Stephens	Henryk de Kwiatkowski	1:39.60
1982	Prince Westport	Jerry D. Bailey	Stanley M. Hough	Harbor View Farm	1:39.00
1981	De La Rose	Eddie Maple	Woody Stephens	Henryk de Kwiatkowski	1:34.40
1980	Key To Content	George Martens	MacKenzie Miller	Rokeby Stable	1:33.80
1979	Told	Jean Cruguet	Philip G. Johnson	Meadowhill	1:34.40
1978	Buckaroo	Jorge Velásquez	John M. Gaver Jr.	Greentree Stable	1:35.00
1977	Bailjumper	Ángel Cordero Jr.	David A. Whiteley	Pen-Y-Bryn Farm	1:35.20
1976	Dance Spell	Ángel Cordero Jr.	James W. Maloney	Christiana Stables	1:34.20
1975	Bravest Roman	Eddie Maple	Woody Stephens	Mrs. John A. Morris	1:34.80
1974	Accipiter	Angel Santiago	Pancho Martin	Sigmund Sommer	1:36.40
1973	Linda's Chief	Braulio Baeza	Al Scotti	Neil Hellman	1:34.00
1972	Icecapade	Eddie Maple	David A. Whiteley	Locust Hill Farm	1:33.60
1971	Salem	Jacinto Vásquez	Edward L. Holton	Christiana Stable	1:34.80
1970	Silent Screen	John L. Rotz	J. Bowes Bond	Elberon Farm	1:36.00
1969	Best Turn	Eddie Belmonte	Henry Forrest	Calumet Farm	1:35.60
1968	Stage Door Johnny	Heliodoro Gustines	John M. Gaver Sr.	Greentree Stable	1:35.40
1967	Bold Hour	John L. Rotz	Bert Mulholland	George D. Widener Jr.	1:36.00
1966	Alexville	Manuel Ycaza	Max Hirsch	Alexandra I. Kissam	1:36.00
1965	La Cima	Bobby Ussery	Homer C. Pardue	Joseph R. Straus	1:34.40
1964	Lt. Stevens	Tommy Barrow	Charles P. Sanborn	Ernest H. Woods	1:36.40
1963	Outing Class	Braulio Baeza	John M. Gaver Sr.	Greentree Stable	1:36.80
1962	David K	Bobby Ussery	Burley Parke	Harbor View Farm	1:35.80
1961	Globemaster	John L. Rotz	Thomas J. Kelly	Leonard P. Sasso	1:36.60
1960	Divine Comedy	Mike Sorrentino	Stanley T. Greene	Llangollen Farm Stable	1:34.60
1959	Mail Order	Paul J. Bailey	Larry H. Thompson	Alamode Farm	1:41.40
1958	Nasco	Ray Broussard	Jim Fitzsimmons	Wheatley Stable	1:44.40
1957	Cohoes	Ted Atkinson	John M. Gaver Sr.	Greentree Stable	1:43.40
1956	Ricci Tavi	Paul J. Bailey	Henry S. Clark	Christiana Stable	1:42.20
1955	Saratoga	Nick Shuk	Frank A. Bonsal	Montpelier	1:44.00
1954	Full Flight	Jesse Higley	Jim Fitzsimmons	Wheatley Stable	1:44.80
1953	First Aid	Augustine Catalano	J. Elliott Burch	Brookmeade Stable	1:43.80
1952	Golden Gloves	Nick Wall	Jim Fitzsimmons	Belair Stud	1:45.40
1951	Bold	Eddie Arcaro	J. Elliott Burch	Brookmeade Stable	1:43.60
1950	Sunglow	Eddie Arcaro	J. Elliott Burch	Brookmeade Stable	1:43.60
1949	Sun Bahram	Eddie Arcaro	Carson Kirk	Mrs. Eben Ellison Jr.	1:45.00
1948	Mount Marcy	Eddie Arcaro	Sylvester Veitch	C. V. Whitney	1:44.20
1942	Bless Me	Sterling Young	George M. Odom	Edward R. Bradley	1:37.20
1941	Whirlaway	Alfred Robertson	Ben A. Jones	Calumet Farm	1:38.00
1940	Parasang	Basil James	Sylvester Veitch	C. V. Whitney	1:38.20
1939	Heather Broom	Basil James	Earl Sande	John Hay Whitney	1:38.80
1938	Thanksgiving	Lucas Dupps	Mary Hirsch	Anne C. Corning	1:38.80

* In 1989, the race was run in two divisions.

== Earlier winners ==
- 1937 – Burning Star
- 1936 – Sun Teddy
- 1935 – Good Gamble
- 1934 – Kievex
- 1933 – War Glory
- 1932 – Morfair
- 1931 – Danour
- 1930 – Whichone
- 1929 – Hard Tack
- 1928 – Sun Edwin
- 1927 – Osmand
- 1926 – Mars
- 1925 – Peanuts
- 1924 – Sarazen
- 1923 – Cherry Pie
- 1922 – Little Chief
- 1921 – Crocus
- 1920 – Dinna Care
- 1919 – Purchase
- 1918 – Motor Cop
- 1917 – Midway
- 1916 – Dodge
- 1915 – Regret
- 1914 – Stromboli
- 1913 – Ten Point
- 1910 – Martinez
- 1909 – Field Mouse
- 1908 – Golconda
- 1907 – Vails
- 1906 – Gallavant
- 1905 – Dandelion
- 1904 – Dolly Spanker
- 1903 – Molly Brant
- 1902 – Hermis
- 1901 – Dublin
