= Royal Delta Stakes =

- Class: Grade III
- Location: Gulfstream Park; Hallandale Beach, Florida, United States
- Inaugurated: 1991 (as Sabin Breeders' Cup Handicap)
- Race type: Thoroughbred – Flat racing
- Website: www.gulfstreampark.com

Race information
- Distance: 1 1/16 miles (8.5 furlongs)
- Surface: Dirt
- Track: left-handed
- Qualification: Four-year-olds and older Fillies and mares
- Weight: 123 lbs with allowances
- Purse: $150,000 (since 2022)

The Royal Delta Stakes is a Grade III American Thoroughbred horse race held annually in February at Gulfstream Park in Hallandale Beach, Florida. A race for fillies and mares aged four and older, it is run over a distance of 1 1/16 miles on dirt. The event currently carries a purse of $150,000.

== History ==
The inaugural running of the race took place on 17 February 1991 as the Sabin Breeders' Cup Handicap over a distance of 1 1/16 miles and was won by Fit for a Queen who was ridden by US Hall of Fame jockey Jerry Bailey and trained by US Hall of Fame trainer Shug McGaughey in a time of 1:42.50.

The event was named in honor for Henryk de Kwiatkowski's multiple Grade I stakes-winning filly Sabin and winner of the 1984 Orchid Handicap at this track where this event is held. Born in 1980, she won 18 of her 25 starts.

The event was classified as Grade III in 1994. In 2009 the conditions of the event were changed to stakes allowances and the race was run as the Sabin Stakes.

Royal Delta, winner of Breeders' Cup Ladies' Classic in 2011 and 2012 won this race in 2013 easily by 5 lengths as the 2/5on favorite. In 2015, Gulfstream Park renamed the race after the three-time Eclipse Award winner to the Royal Delta Stakes.

This race was upgraded to a Grade II event for its 2014 running but returned to Grade III status in 2018.

The event has had numerous distance changes which can be viewed in the winner's table in the Winners section of this article.

== Records ==
Speed record:

- 1 1/16 miles – 1:41:00 Devil's Cave (2014)
- 1 mile – 1:35.18 Blamed (2019)
- 1 mile & 70 yards – 1:39.57 Hunzinga (1994)
- 1 1/8 miles – 1:50.49 Taittinger Rose (2006)

Margins:

- 8 lengths – Awesome Maria (2012)

Most wins:

- 2 – Awesome Maria (2011, 2012)

Most wins by a jockey:

- 4 – John Velazquez (2004, 2005, 2011, 2012)

Most wins by a trainer:

- 5 – Saffie Joseph Jr. (2020, 2021, 2024, 2025, 2026)

Most wins by an owner:

- 2 – H. Joseph Allen (1997, 2004)
- 2 – Hobeau Farm (1998, 2007)
- 2 – Richard, Bertram & Elaine Klein (2001, 2003)
- 2 – E. Paul Robsham Stables (2011, 2012)
- 2 - Miller Racing (2025, 2026)

== Winners ==
Year	Winner	Age	Jockey	Trainer	Owner	Distance	Time	Purse	Grade	Ref
Royal Delta Stakes
2026	Claret Beret	5	Micah J. Husbands	Saffie Joseph Jr.	Miller Racing	1 1/16 miles	1:44.86	$150,000	III	
2025	Dazzling Move	4	Dylan Davis	Saffie Joseph Jr.	Miller Racing	1 1/16 miles	1:45.08	$150,000	III	
2024	Honor D Lady	4	Jose L. Ortiz	Saffie Joseph Jr.	Final Furlong Farm & Madaket Stables	1 1/16 miles	1:44.74	$154,000	III	
2023	Classy Edition	4	Irad Ortiz Jr.	Todd A. Pletcher	Robert E. & Lawana L. Low	1 1/16 miles	1:45.15	$150,000	III	
2022	Letruska	6	Jose L. Ortiz	Fausto Gutierrez	St George Stables	1 1/16 miles	1:43.43	$150,000	III	
2021	Queen Nekia	6	Corey Lanerie	Saffie Joseph Jr.	Ken Copenhaver	1 1/16 miles	1:43.62	$100,000	III	
2020	Cookie Dough	4	Paco Lopez	Saffie Joseph Jr.	Arindel	1 1/16 miles	1:43.57	$150,000	III	
2019	Blamed	4	Irad Ortiz Jr.	William I. Mott	Cleber J. Massey	1 mile	1:35.18	$150,000	III	
2018	Martini Glass	5	Paco Lopez	Keith Nations	Vince Campanella & Nation's Racing Stable	1 mile	1:36.48	$200,000	III	
2017	Curlin's Approval	4	Luis Saez	Martin D. Wolfson	Alter's Racing Stable	1 1/16 miles	1:44.90	$200,000	II	
2016	Penwith	5	Luis Saez	Kiaran P. McLaughlin	Godolphin Racing	1 1/16 miles	1:43.16	$200,000	II	
2015	Sheer Drama	5	Joe Bravo	David Fawkes	Harold L. Queen	1 1/16 miles	1:43.85	$200,000	II	
Sabin Stakes
2014	Devil's Cave	4	Javier Castellano	Martin D. Wolfson	Alpha Delta Stables	1 1/16 miles	1:41.00	$215,000	II	
2013	Royal Delta	5	Mike E. Smith	William I. Mott	Besilu Stables	1 1/16 miles	1:43.31	$98,000	III	
2012	Awesome Maria	5	John R. Velazquez	Todd A. Pletcher	E. Paul Robsham Stables	1 1/16 miles	1:42.82	$98,000	III	
2011	Awesome Maria	4	John R. Velazquez	Todd A. Pletcher	E. Paul Robsham Stables	1 mile	1:36.38	$100,000	III	
2010	Aurora Lights	4	Cornelio Velasquez	Eric Coatrieux	Chiefswood Stables	1 mile	1:37.79	$100,000	III	
2009	One Caroline	4	Edgar S. Prado	George R. Arnold II	G. Watts Humphrey Jr.	1 mile	1:36.87	$100,000	III	
Sabin Handicap
2008	Lady Marlboro	4	Javier Castellano	James A. Jerkens	Susan & John Moore	1 mile	1:37.21	$98,000	III	Dead heat
2008	Golden Velvet	5	Eibar Coa	Kiaran P. McLaughlin	Darley Stable	1 mile	1:37.21	$98,000	III	Dead heat
2007	Swap Fliparoo	4	Javier Castellano	H. Allen Jerkens	Hobeau Farm	1 mile	1:37.73	$140,000	III	
2006	Taittinger Rose	5	Edgar S. Prado	William I. Mott	Mike G. Rutherford	1 1/8 miles	1:50.49	$100,000	III	
2005	Isola Piu Bella (CHI)	5	John R. Velazquez	Todd A. Pletcher	Sumaya U.S. Stable	1 1/8 miles	1:50.68	$100,000	III	
2004	Roar Emotion	4	John R. Velazquez	Kiaran P. McLaughlin	H. Joseph Allen	1 1/16 miles	1:43.32	$100,000	III	
2003	Allamerican Bertie	4	Jerry D. Bailey	Steven B. Flint	Richard, Bertram & Elaine Klein	1 1/16 miles	1:42.49	$100,000	III	
2002	Miss Linda (ARG)	5	Richard Migliore	John C. Kimmel	Ackerley Brothers Farm	1 1/16 miles	1:42.61	$100,000	III	
2001	De Bertie	4	Jorge F. Chavez	Bernard S. Flint	Richard, Bertram & Elaine Klein	1 1/16 miles	1:44.74	$103,000	III	
2000	Brushed Halory	4	Mike E. Smith	Josie Carroll	James & Alice Sapara	1 mile & 70 yards	1:41.84	$75,000	III	
1999	Timely Broad	5	Nicholas J. Petro	Michael P. Petro	Timothy Cunningham	1 mile & 70 yards	1:42.50	$75,000	III	
1998	Radiant Megan	5	Julie Krone	H. Allen Jerkens	Hobeau Farm	1 mile & 70 yards	1:41.25	$75,000	III	
1997	Rare Blend	4	Jerry D. Bailey	Claude R. McGaughey III	H. Joseph Allen	1 mile & 70 yards	1:41.28	$75,000	III	
1996	Lindsay Frolic	4	Pat Day	Milton W. Wolfson	Stride Rite Racing Stable	1 mile & 70 yards	1:43.70	$75,000	III	
1995	Recognizable	4	Mike E. Smith	Claude R. McGaughey III	Ogden Mills Phipps	1 mile & 70 yards	1:42.50	$75,000	III	
1994	Hunzinga	5	Julio E. Felix	Barranet Farquharson	Pauline Farquharson	1 mile & 70 yards	1:39.57	$75,000	III	
1993	Now Dance	4	Mark Guidry	J. Bert Sonnier	Saron Stable	1 mile & 70 yards	1:41.68	$50,000	Listed	
1992	Lemhi Go	4	Robert Neal Lester	Robert G. Voelkner	R Magers	1 1/16 miles	1:44.79	$75,000	Listed	
1991	Fit for a Queen	5	Jerry D. Bailey	Claude R. McGaughey III	Hermitage Farm	1 1/16 miles	1:42.50	$76,700	Listed	

== See also ==
- List of American and Canadian Graded races
