= Royal Glint =

American-bred Thoroughbred racehorse

- Sire: Round Table
- Grandsire: Princequillo
- Dam: Regal Gleam
- Damsire: Hail To Reason
- Sex: Gelding
- Foaled: 1970
- Country: United States
- Colour: Bay
- Breeder: Claiborne Farm
- Owner: Dan Lasater
- Trainer: 1) Jere R. Smith, Sr. 2) Gordon R. Potter
- Record: 52: 21-9-4
- Earnings: US$1,004,816

Major wins
- Patriot Stakes (1973); Sun Beau Handicap (1974); Amory L. Haskell Handicap (1975); Arlington Handicap (1975); Hawthorne Gold Cup Handicap (1975); Kelly-Olympic Handicap (1975); San Bernardino Handicap (1975); United Nations Handicap (1975); Grey Lag Handicap (1976); Hazel Park Trial Stakes (1976); Razorback Handicap (1976); Salvator Mile Handicap (1976); Santa Anita Handicap (1976); Trenton Handicap (1976)

Honours
- Royal Glint Stakes at Hawthorne Race Course

Royal Glint (1970–1976) was an American Thoroughbred racehorse.

== Background ==
Royal Glint was a bay gelding bred by Claiborne Farm of Paris, Kentucky. He was sired by U.S. Racing Hall of Fame inductee Round Table and was out of the mare Regal Gleam, the 1966 American Champion Two-Year-Old Filly. Damsire Hail To Reason was the 1960 American Champion Two-Year-Old Colt and the Leading sire in North America in 1970.

Royal Glint was purchased by Arkansas businessman Dan Lasater, who entrusted his race conditioning to Jere Smith, Sr.

== Racing career ==
A winner at age three and four, at age five in 1975 he was transferred to Lasater's East Coast trainer Gordon Potter.

He won five important graded stakes races on both dirt and grass including the 1975 San Bernardino Handicap, in which he equaled the track record for a mile and an eight on grass. In 1976, Royal Glint added another five stakes races to his credit, including California's richest race and most prestigious event for older horses, the Santa Anita Handicap.

== Final race and death ==
While leading in the August 21, 1976, Michigan Mile Handicap at Detroit Race Course, Royal Glint suffered a career-ending leg injury that, despite efforts by veterinarians, eventually led to him being euthanized. He was buried at Longfield Farm near Goshen, Kentucky. Royal Glint was the 19th Thoroughbred in racing history to earn more than $1 million.

== Pedigree ==
Pedigree of Royal Glint
Sire Round Table	Princequillo	Prince Rose	Rose Prince
Sire Round Table	Princequillo	Prince Rose	Indolence
Sire Round Table	Princequillo	Cosquilla	Papyrus
Sire Round Table	Princequillo	Cosquilla	Quick Thought
Sire Round Table	Knight's Daughter	Sir Cosmo	The Boss
Sire Round Table	Knight's Daughter	Sir Cosmo	Ayn Hali
Sire Round Table	Knight's Daughter	Feola	Friar Marcus
Sire Round Table	Knight's Daughter	Feola	Aloe
Dam Regal Gleam	Hail To Reason	Turn-To	Royal Charger
Dam Regal Gleam	Hail To Reason	Turn-To	Source Sucree
Dam Regal Gleam	Hail To Reason	Nothirdchance	Blue Swords
Dam Regal Gleam	Hail To Reason	Nothirdchance	Galla Colors
Dam Regal Gleam	Miz Carol	Stymie	Equestrian
Dam Regal Gleam	Miz Carol	Stymie	Stop Watch
Dam Regal Gleam	Miz Carol	No Fiddling	King Cole
Dam Regal Gleam	Miz Carol	No Fiddling	Big Hurry
