= Dance Spell =

American-bred Thoroughbred racehorse

- Sire: Northern Dancer
- Grandsire: Nearctic
- Dam: Obeah
- Damsire: Cyane
- Sex: Stallion
- Foaled: 1973
- Country: United States
- Colour: Bay
- Breeder: Christiana Stables
- Owner: Christiana Stables
- Trainer: James W. Maloney
- Record: 25: 7-9-4
- Earnings: US$326,090

Major wins
- Saranac Stakes (1976); Jerome Handicap (1976); Jamaica Handicap (1976)
- Last updated on July 5, 2010

Dance Spell (1973–1979) was an American Thoroughbred racehorse bred in Kentucky by Harry and Jane Lunger's Christiana Stables. They entrusted his race conditioning to U.S. Racing Hall of Fame inductee, James W. Maloney.

As a two-year-old in 1975, Dance Spell's best results in major races was second place in both the Laurel Futurity and the Champagne Stakes to Honest Pleasure who was voted that year's Eclipse Award as the American Champion Two-Year-Old Colt. At age three in 1976, Dance Spell did not compete in the U.S. Triple Crown series but in July upset the undefeated Zen in winning the Saranac Stakes. He won the Jerome Handicap in September and in late October defeated Honest Pleasure to win the Jamaica Handicap. Dance Spell also notably earned a second in the Woodward Stakes and the Jim Dandy Stakes plus a third-place finish in the Travers Stakes.

Retired to stud duty for the 1978 season, Dance Spell performed for less than two full seasons before flipping over in his paddock and sustaining injuries of such severity that the valuable stallion had to be euthanized. However, a large percentage of his two crops of foals made it to racing, including multiple Graded stakes race winners Broom Dance and Fortnightly.
