= Aloma's Ruler =

American-bred Thoroughbred racehorse

- Sire: Iron Ruler
- Grandsire: Never Bend
- Dam: Aloma
- Damsire: Native Charger
- Sex: Stallion
- Foaled: 1979
- Country: United States
- Colour: Bay
- Breeder: Silk Willoughby Farm
- Owner: Nathan Scherr
- Trainer: John J. Lenzini Jr.
- Record: 13: 7-4-1
- Earnings: US$498,883

Major wins
- Nutley Stakes (1981); Bahamas Stakes (1982); Withers Stakes (1982); Jersey Derby (1982); American Triple Crown wins: Preakness Stakes (1982)

Aloma's Ruler (1979–2003) was an American Thoroughbred racehorse who won the second leg of the 1982 U.S. Triple Crown series, the Preakness Stakes.

== Background ==
Aloma's Ruler was purchased for $92,000 at the 1981 Hialeah, Florida sale of two-year-olds by Baltimore, Maryland businessman Nathan "Red" Scherr (1923–2003), who was advised by trainer John Lenzini Jr.

== Racing career ==
Sent to the track at age two, Aloma's Ruler won one stakes race. At age three in 1982, under star jockey Ángel Cordero Jr. he won the Bahamas Stakes at Hialeah Park Race Track on January 7. With a new rider, sixteen-year-old Jack Kaenel, he captured the May 8 Withers Stakes at Aqueduct Racetrack. Then, with Kaenel again in the saddle for the biggest win of his career, he defeated prohibitive favorite Linkage in the Preakness Stakes at Pimlico Race Course. In a race devoid of early speed, Aloma's Ruler made the lead easily, slowed the pace down the back stretch, and held on to win. He finished ninth over a sloppy track in the Belmont Stakes and with Ángel Cordero Jr. back on board, won the Jersey Derby at Atlantic City Race Course in July. Aloma's Ruler came out of a second-place finish on August 2t Travers Stakes at Saratoga Race Course with an ankle injury that ended his racing career.

== Breeding record ==
Retired to stud, Aloma's Ruler met with limited success. From his eighteen crops, he sired six stakes winners.

Aloma's Ruler died from an apparent heart attack at age twenty-four on June 21, 2003, at an Illinois farm.

== Pedigree ==
Pedigree of Aloma's Ruler
Sire Iron Ruler	Never Bend	Nasrullah	Nearco
Sire Iron Ruler	Never Bend	Nasrullah	Mumtaz Begum
Sire Iron Ruler	Never Bend	Lalun	Djeddah
Sire Iron Ruler	Never Bend	Lalun	Be Faithful
Sire Iron Ruler	Obedient	Mahmoud	Blenheim
Sire Iron Ruler	Obedient	Mahmoud	Mah Mahal
Sire Iron Ruler	Obedient	Uvira	Umidwar
Sire Iron Ruler	Obedient	Uvira	Lady Lawless
Dam Aloma	Native Charger	Native Dancer	Polynesian
Dam Aloma	Native Charger	Native Dancer	Geisha
Dam Aloma	Native Charger	Greek Blond	Heliopolis
Dam Aloma	Native Charger	Greek Blond	Peroxide
Dam Aloma	Cathy Honey	Francis S.	Royal Charger
Dam Aloma	Cathy Honey	Francis S.	Blue Eyed Momo
Dam Aloma	Cathy Honey	Honey Ration	Blue Peter
Dam Aloma	Cathy Honey	Honey Ration	Run Honey
