= Cicada (horse) =

American-bred Thoroughbred racehorse

- Sire: Bryan G.
- Grandsire: Blenheim
- Dam: Satsuma
- Damsire: Bossuet
- Sex: Filly
- Foaled: 1959
- Country: United States
- Colour: Bay
- Breeder: Meadow Stud, Inc.
- Owner: Meadow Stable
- Trainer: Casey Hayes
- Record: 42 Starts: 23 - 8 - 6
- Earnings: $783,674

Major wins
- Blue Hen Stakes (1961); National Stallion Stakes (1961); Schuylerville Stakes (1961); Spinaway Stakes (1961); Matron Stakes (1961); Astarita Stakes (1961); Frizette Stakes (1961); Gardenia Stakes (1961); Kentucky Oaks (1962); Acorn Stakes (1962); Oaks Prep (1962); Mother Goose Stakes (1962); Beldame Stakes (1962); Jersey Belle Stakes (1962); Columbiana Handicap (1963); Distaff Handicap (1963); Vagrancy Handicap (1963); Sheepshead Bay Handicap (1963)

Awards
- American Champion Two-Year-Old Filly (1961); American Champion Three-Year-Old Filly (1962); American Champion Older Female Horse (1963)

Honours
- U.S. Racing Hall of Fame (1967) #62 - Top 100 U.S. Racehorses of the 20th Century; Cicada Stakes at Aqueduct Racetrack

Cicada (May 9, 1959 – 1981) was an American Thoroughbred racehorse who was the first filly in American racing history to be awarded consecutive championships at the ages of two, three and four. She was inducted into the National Museum of Racing and Hall of Fame in 1967.

== Background ==
Cicada was bred by Christopher Chenery's Meadow Stud. A bay filly standing 15.2 hands (62 inches, 157 cm) high, she was by Bryan G. and out of Satsuma by Bossuet. Satsuma's dam was Hildene, the first horse owned by Chenery (whose Meadow Stable later bred and owned Secretariat). Sired by the 1926 Kentucky Derby winner Bubbling Over, Hildene cost only $600 but became a "blue hen" mare (a prolific producer of quality offspring). Hildene was named Kentucky Broodmare of the Year in 1950, the same year her son Hill Prince was named Horse of the Year.

Cicada was trained by Casey Hayes, who also trained Hill Prince, First Landing, and Sir Gaylord.

== Racing career ==
Hayes believed in starting his horses young, so Cicada first raced in February 1961 at Hialeah Park Race Track and won easily by 4½ lengths. She won one allowance race and lost one before being entered in her first stakes race. She lost the Fashion Stakes, but then won her third allowance easily. She won the Blue Hen Stakes wire-to-wire, winning by 5½ lengths. Cicada was never out of the money in her sixteen starts as a two-year-old. She won eleven of those races (including the final six in a row) and set a new record for earnings by a filly. Her stakes victories included the Schuylerville, Frizette, Matron, and Spinaway. She was named the Champion two-year-old filly of 1961.

In her first race in 1962 as a three-year-old, she won an allowance race against older males. She then ran one of her most courageous efforts in the Florida Derby, a major prep for the Kentucky Derby against some of the best colts in the country. It turned into a two horse battle between Cicada and Ridan, with Cicada losing by a nose. After she easily won the Oaks Prep (now called the Eight Belles Stakes) she was considered for the Kentucky Derby but her stablemate Sir Gaylord was entered instead, then went lame and was unable to race. Cicada entered the Kentucky Oaks and won by three lengths. The purse made her the world's leading money-winning filly or mare of all time, replacing Bewitch. She finished the year with 8 wins from 17 starts. Her other wins included the Acorn, Mother Goose and Beldame Stakes, in which she broke Kelso's track record for nine furlongs at Aqueduct. She also finished second in the Coaching Club American Oaks and third in the Alabama Stakes. Cicada also ran in the 1962 Travers Stakes finishing fourth behind the winner Jaipur. She received the Eclipse Award for Outstanding Three-Year-Old Filly of 1962.

At age four, Cicada raced eight times and won four: the Columbiana, Sheepshead Bay, Vagrancy and Distaff handicaps. She was awarded the title of Champion older female horse of 1963. She suffered an injury and was temporarily retired, then returned at age five for one last race in which she finished fourth.

In 1967, Cicada was inducted into the National Museum of Racing and Hall of Fame. In 1993, the Cicada Stakes at Aqueduct was created in her honor. In the Blood-Horse magazine List of the Top 100 U.S. Racehorses of the 20th Century, she was ranked #62.

== Breeding record ==
As a broodmare, Cicada was not a great success. In her first season, she proved barren and was returned to the races. Retired a second time, she foaled Cicada's Pride in 1966 (by Sir Gaylord) who won the 1968 Juvenile Stakes at Belmont Park. She produced a total of four winners from six live foals.

Cicada lived until the age of 22, dying in 1981. She is buried at Jonabell Farm in Kentucky.

== Pedigree ==
Pedigree of Cicada, bay mare, 1959
Sire Bryan G. 1947	Blenheim; 1927	Blandford (IRE)	Swynford (GB)
Sire Bryan G. 1947	Blenheim; 1927	Blandford (IRE)	Blanche
Sire Bryan G. 1947	Blenheim; 1927	Malva (GB)	Charles O'Malley (GB)
Sire Bryan G. 1947	Blenheim; 1927	Malva (GB)	Wild Arum (GB)
Sire Bryan G. 1947	Anthemion; 1940	Pompey	Sun Briar
Sire Bryan G. 1947	Anthemion; 1940	Pompey	Cleopatra
Sire Bryan G. 1947	Anthemion; 1940	Sicklefeather	Sickle
Sire Bryan G. 1947	Anthemion; 1940	Sicklefeather	Fairness
Dam Satsuma 1949	Bossuet; 1940	Boswell	Bosworth (GB)
Dam Satsuma 1949	Bossuet; 1940	Boswell	Flying Gal
Dam Satsuma 1949	Bossuet; 1940	Vibrations	Sir Cosmo
Dam Satsuma 1949	Bossuet; 1940	Vibrations	Ciliata
Dam Satsuma 1949	Hildene; 1938	Bubbling Over	North Star
Dam Satsuma 1949	Hildene; 1938	Bubbling Over	Beaming Beauty
Dam Satsuma 1949	Hildene; 1938	Fancy Racket	Wrack
Dam Satsuma 1949	Hildene; 1938	Fancy Racket	Ultimate Fancy (family: 9-b)
