= Benjamin Leon =

Cuban-American businessman (born 1944)

Benjamín León
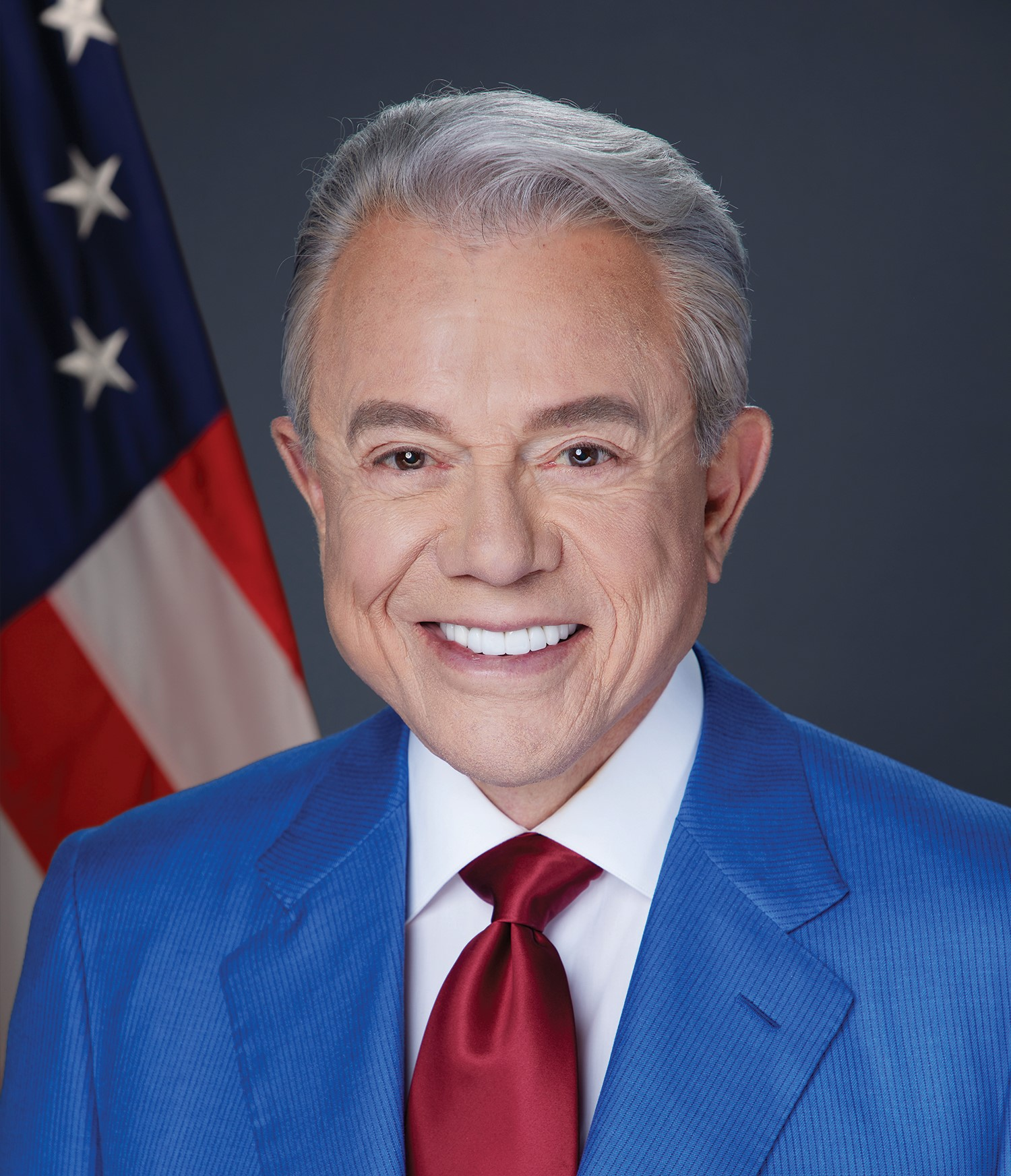
- Official portrait, 2026

United States Ambassador to Spain
- Incumbent
- Assumed office February 18, 2026
- President: Donald Trump
- Preceded by: Julissa Reynoso Pantaleón (2024)

Personal details
- Born: Benjamín León Jr. December 4, 1944 (age 81) Oriente, Cuba
- Citizenship: Cuba; United States
- Spouse: Mavileibys Campa Felipe
- Children: 3
- Occupation: Businessman; diplomat

Benjamín León Jr. (born December 4, 1944) is a Cuban-American businessman and horse enthusiast who is serving as the United States ambassador to Spain and Andorra.

== Early life and career ==
Benjamin Leon was born in Oriente, Cuba in 1944, and in 1961, he migrated to Miami, Florida. He is of Spanish descent through his great grandparents who were from the Canary Islands that settled in Cuba. Leon's father founded Clinica Cuba in 1964 in order to help meet the healthcare needs of newly immigrated Cubans. Leon and his father Leon Sr. also founded Clínica Asociación Cubana (CAC), one of the first health maintenance organizations in the United States. In 1994, Leon sold CAC to UnitedHealthCare for $500 million. In 1996, Leon founded Leon Medical Centers, which provides healthcare to Medicare patients. Leon Medical Centers is currently led by Leon's son, Benjamin Leon III, who serves as the company's CEO.

== Besilu Stables ==
In the 1980s, Leon established Besilu Stables, and began to show and breed Paso Fino horses. In 2008, Leon bought his first Thoroughbred, and soon after started racing horses. In 2011, Leon bought Royal Delta for $8.5 million. She would win the Eclipse Award for American Champion Three-Year-Old Filly in 2011 and again in 2012 and 2013 as the American Champion Older Dirt Female Horse.

== Political activity and philanthropy ==
In 2008, Leon donated $10 million to establish the Florida International University Family Center for Geriatrics Research and Education.

In 2015, Leon donated $2.5 million to the presidential campaign of Marco Rubio. Leon has also donated to the Republican Party of Kentucky and Mitch McConnell. He was also a major donor to Donald Trump's reelection campaign.

In 2025, Leon was one of the donors who funded the White House's East Wing demolition, and planned building of a ballroom.

In December 2025, the Senate confirmed Leon's nomination to be Ambassador to Spain.
