= John J. Lenzini Jr. =

John Lenzini Jr.
Personal information
- Born: January 10, 1947 Weymouth, Massachusetts; United States
- Died: November 15, 1996 (aged 49)
- Occupation: Horse trainer

Horse racing career
- Sport: Horse racing
- Career wins: Not found

Major racing wins
- Laurel Futurity (1976); Remsen Stakes (1976); Bahamas Stakes (1982); Jersey Derby (1982); Withers Stakes (1982, 1988); Gotham Stakes (1985); Wood Memorial Stakes (1985); Hill Prince Stakes (1987); Paumonok Handicap (1987); Comely Stakes (1988); Distaff Handicap (1989); Hudson Stakes (NYB) (1989); Westchester Handicap (1990); Toboggan Handicap (1992, 1995); Sport Page Handicap (1993) U.S. Triple Crown series: Preakness Stakes (1982)

Significant horses
- Royal Ski, Aloma's Ruler, Eternal Prince, Avie's Gal, Best by Test, Once Wild, Boom Towner

John Joseph "Butch" Lenzini Jr. (January 10, 1947 - November 13, 1996) was an American horse trainer in Thoroughbred flat racing best known for winning the 1982 Preakness Stakes, the second leg of the U.S. Triple Crown series.

== Biography ==
Nicknamed "Butch," he was born in Weymouth, Massachusetts, but raised in Rhode Island. His father, John Sr., was a trainer who worked at racetracks on the East Coast of the United States. Following in his father's footsteps, Lenzini Jr. earned his first win as a professional trainer in 1969 at Narragansett Park in Pawtucket, Rhode Island.

After relocating to race at tracks in Maryland, he was hired by Boston Bruins goalie Gerry Cheevers to trainer his horses, the best of which would be Grade 1 winner Royal Ski.

=== Aloma's Ruler ===
Lenzini's association with Baltimore builder Nathan Scherr brought him his greatest success in racing in 1982. Lenzini picked out Aloma's Ruler, for Scherr who bought him at the Hialeah 2 year old sales. The following January he won the Bahamas Stakes at Hialeah Park Race Track, the May 8th Withers Stakes at Aqueduct Racetrack, then the biggest win of his career, the Preakness Stakes at Pimlico Race Course.

In July, Aloma's Ruler won the Jersey Derby at Monmouth Park but came out of a second-place finish in the August 21st Travers Stakes at Saratoga Race Course with an ankle injury that ended his career. Aloma's Ruler retired to stud and died in 2003 at age 24.

=== Move to New York ===
In 1984, John Lenzini Jr. moved his training operation to New York where he was the trainer for Brian J. Hurst and Eternal Prince. The colt won the 1985 Gotham Stakes and Wood Memorial Stakes and was third in the Preakness Stakes. Lenzini was based at Aqueduct Racetrack. In New York, Cleveland Johnson worked as Lenzini's assistant trainer. Johnson would be the last African-American trainer in New York at the time.

On November 13, 1996, John Lenzini Jr. died unexpectedly at age forty-nine at his home at Woodbury, Long Island, New York. He was found by his girlfriend, jockey Diane Nelson when she couldn't find him after going to ride his horses. He saddled his last two runners only four days previously.
