= Blue Hen Stakes =

- Class: Non-graded Stakes
- Location: Delaware Park Racetrack; Stanton, Delaware, United States
- Race type: Thoroughbred - Flat racing
- Website: www.delawarepark.com

Race information
- Distance: 1 1/16 miles (8.5 furlongs)
- Surface: Dirt
- Track: left-handed
- Qualification: Two-year-old fillies
- Weight: Assigned
- Purse: $75,000

The Blue Hen Stakes is an American Thoroughbred horse race for two-year-old fillies held annually in early October at Delaware Park Racetrack in Stanton, Delaware. A non-graded stakes event raced on dirt, since 2004 it has been contested at a distance of one and one-sixteenth miles (8.5 furlongs).

The Blue Hen is named for the horse breeding term "Blue Hen," meaning a mare who has proved herself exceptional in producing high quality foals, almost regardless of which stallion might be the sire. These sons and daughters would also affect the breed. An example of the highest sort of Blue Hen mare would be La Troienne.

In 1965 and 1971, the race was run in two divisions.

== Winners since 2000 ==
Year	Winner	Jockey	Trainer	Owner	Distance (F)	Time
2010	Summer Laugh	Fernando Jara	Todd Pletcher	Edward P. Evans	8.5 F	1:46.5
2009	Ms Vanenzza	Joseph Rocco, Jr.	Juan C. Vazquez	Florence Patitucci	8.5 F	1:45.74
2008	Bon Jovi Girl	Jose Caraballo	Timothy F. Ritchey	Timothy F. Ritchey & Chuck Zacney	8.5 F	1:46.10
2007	Saki To Me	Abel Castellano, Jr.	Edmond D. Gaudet	Morris Bailey	8.5 F	1:48.83
2006	Miss Goodnight	Stewart Elliott	Timothy F. Ritchey	CJZ Racing Stable	8.5 F	1:46.63
2005	Love Locket	Christopher DeCarlo	Todd A. Pletcher	Michael Tabor	8.5 F	1:47.37
2004	Buzz Song	Christopher DeCarlo	Todd A. Pletcher	Bonnie & Sy Baskin	8.5 F	1:45.99
2003	Vogue Girl	Robby Albarado	Allen Iwinski	Stan Stefanski	8 F	1:38.81
2002	Heirloom Diamond	Jeremy Rose	Timothy F. Ritchey	S J B Jr. Stable	8 F	1:41.79
2001	Treasure Coast Gem	Jeremy Rose	Francis Campitelli	James H. McCaul	8 F	1:39.93
2000	Xtra Heat	Mark T. Johnston	John E. Salzman, Sr.	K. Taylor/H. Deitchman/J. Salzman	6 F	1:11.80

== Earlier winners ==
(partial list)

- 1999 - Fiesty Countess
- 1998 - Godmother
- 1997 - Expensive Issue
- 1996 - The Lady's Unreal
- 1977 - Mesa Warrant
- 1976 - Nearna
- 1972 - Tuerta
- 1971 - Misty Bryn
- 1971 - Hasty Jude
- 1970 - Unity Hall
- 1969 - Gay Meeting
- 1968 - Parisian Parfait
- 1967 - Obeah
- 1966 - Regal Gleam
- 1965 - Ogirema
- 1965 - Turn To Talent
- 1964 - Come Hither Look
- 1963 - Katie Kitten
- 1962 - Nalee
- 1961 - Cicada
- 1960 - Baby Kiki
- 1959 - Blonde Demond
- 1958 - Nora Dares
