= Linkage (horse) =

American Thoroughbred racehorse

- Sire: Hoist the Flag
- Grandsire: Tom Rolfe
- Dam: Unity Hall
- Damsire: Cyane
- Sex: Stallion
- Foaled: 1979
- Country: United States
- Color: Dark Brown
- Breeder: Jane du Pont Lunger
- Owner: Christiana Stables
- Trainer: Henry S. Clark
- Record: 18: 11-3-1
- Earnings: US$410,013

Major wins
- Forerunner Stakes (1981); Blue Grass Stakes (1982); Louisiana Derby Trial Stakes (1982); Lecomte Stakes (1982); Black Gold Handicap (1982)

Linkage (born in 1979 in Kentucky) was an American Thoroughbred racehorse he was the son of Hoist the Flag and grandson to Tom Rolfe. Linkage will be best remembered for winning the 1982 Blue Grass Stakes and placing second five weeks later in the $200,000 grade 1 Preakness Stakes to Aloma's Ruler.

== Early racing career ==
At age two Linkage won his maiden in his first career start at Delaware Park With Jockey Greg Smith. 1 Month later won an allowance race at Bowie Race Track and then was wintered at and started at The Fair Grounds In Louisiana.

At age three he was shipped with the rest of trainer Henry S. Clark's stable of horses to New Orleans, Louisiana for the winter. He flourished early in the winter at Fair Grounds and won or placed in every race in which he was entered, all under his regular Jockey Greg Smith. All were run against his fellow three-year-old colts. In early January he raced in and won the $60,000 Black Gold Handicap at six furlongs over Talent Town also at Fairgrounds. In late January he won the grade-3 $80,000 Lecomte Stakes at Fair Grounds Race Course over Soy Emperor at a mile and one sixteenth. In late February he won the $100,000 grade two Louisiana Derby Trial Stakes now called the Risen Star Stakes at a mile and one sixteenth. He did this in impressive fashion with regular Jockey Greg Smith up, beating the previously undefeated El Baba who was 7-0 coming into the race.

Clark decided to run in two last big prep races to get Linkage ready for a triple crown campaign. In march he was entered in the $150,000 grade two Louisiana Derby. In that race he was beaten by his arch-rival El Baba who turned the tables on him and beat him by a length. Linkage was then shipped to Kentucky and was entered in the $150,000 grade one Blue Grass Stakes at Keeneland Race Course at a mile and one eighth. In the Blue Grass he beat eventual Kentucky Derby winner Gato Del Sol by two lengths. The race seemed to take a bit out of Linkage and with only three weeks until the Derby, Clark decided to skip that race and focus entirely on the Preakness Stakes.

== Preakness Stakes ==
Five weeks after his Blue Grass victory, his trainer Henry S. Clark entered Linkage in the $200,000 Preakness Stakes was run at a mile and three sixteenths on dirt at Pimlico Race Course in Baltimore, Maryland. Linkage was listed as the heavy 1-2 favorite in a field of seven stakes- winning colts. He Linkage broke well in second place under Bill Shoemaker but was aggressively rated back to third going into Pimlico's famous "Clubhouse Turn." Linkage was taken to the outside and moved into third going down the backstretch. Fractions were swift on the front end, with the first quarter in :234/5 and the half in :48 flat.

Linkage was on the outside but was hemming in the others around him snugly. He was always within striking distance of the front runner Aloma's Ruler. At three quarters of a mile, he was one length back and at the mile He was one and half back as the leader tipped the clock at 1:362/5 for eight furlongs. At the top of the stretch, Shoemaker asked Linkage for his run, and he responded willingly. He closed steadily but could not quite catch Aloma's Ruler, who held on to win by a neck. Linkage came in second by seven lengths over 41-1 longshot Cut Away. Linkage took home 20% of the purse, or $40,000.

== Late career ==
At age four Linkage seemed to slow down a bit. He only managed to place third in the grade one Monmouth Handicap (now renamed the Philip H. Iselin Stakes) at Monmouth Park Racetrack in Oceanport, New Jersey.

Linkage died of natural causes in early September 2006, at Horizon Farm, Alberta, Canada.

Track Date Race Race Type Breed Finish Equibase Monmouth Park 8/20/1983 9 Monmouth Handicap (Gr. 1) TB 3 Saratoga 7/30/1983 8 Whitney Handicap (Gr. 1) TB 6 Belmont Park 7/9/1983 1 Allowance TB 1 Belmont Park 6/18/1983 7 Allowance TB 1 Monmouth Park 5/23/1983 8 Allowance TB 1 Monmouth Park 7/31/1982 8 Haskell Invitational Handicap (Gr. 1) TB 5 Belmont Park 6/5/1982 8 Belmont Stakes (Gr. 1) TB 4 Pimlico 5/15/1982 8 Preakness Stakes (Gr. 1) TB 2 Keeneland 4/22/1982 7 Blue Grass Stakes (Gr. 1) TB 1 Keeneland 4/15/1982 7 Allowance TB 1 Fair Grounds 3/28/1982 10 Louisiana Derby (Gr. 2) TB 2 Fair Grounds 3/13/1982 9 Handicap TB 1 Fair Grounds 2/20/1982 9 Le Comte Handicap TB 1 Fair Grounds 2/6/1982 9 Black Gold Handicap TB 1 Fair Grounds 1/23/1982 5 Allowance TB 1 Fair Grounds 1/16/1982 9 Handicap TB 2 Bowie 10/2/1981 6 Allowance TB 1 Delaware Park 9/7/1981 2 Maiden Special Weight TB 1

== Breeding ==
Pedigree of Linkage
Sire Hoist the Flag bay 1968	Tom Rolfe bay 1962	Ribot	Tenerani
Sire Hoist the Flag bay 1968	Tom Rolfe bay 1962	Ribot	Romanella
Sire Hoist the Flag bay 1968	Tom Rolfe bay 1962	Pocahontas	Roman
Sire Hoist the Flag bay 1968	Tom Rolfe bay 1962	Pocahontas	How
Sire Hoist the Flag bay 1968	Wavy Navy bay 1954	War Admiral	Man o' War*
Sire Hoist the Flag bay 1968	Wavy Navy bay 1954	War Admiral	Brushup
Sire Hoist the Flag bay 1968	Wavy Navy bay 1954	Triomphe	Tourbillon
Sire Hoist the Flag bay 1968	Wavy Navy bay 1954	Triomphe	Melibee
Dam Unity Hall bay 1968	Cyane bay 1959	Turn-To	Royal Charger
Dam Unity Hall bay 1968	Cyane bay 1959	Turn-To	Source Sucree
Dam Unity Hall bay 1968	Cyane bay 1959	Your Game	Beau Pere
Dam Unity Hall bay 1968	Cyane bay 1959	Your Game	Winkle
Dam Unity Hall bay 1968	Rum Bottle Bay bay 1959	Thinking Cap	Rosemont
Dam Unity Hall bay 1968	Rum Bottle Bay bay 1959	Thinking Cap	Camargo
Dam Unity Hall bay 1968	Rum Bottle Bay bay 1959	Sea Snack	Hard Tack*
Dam Unity Hall bay 1968	Rum Bottle Bay bay 1959	Sea Snack	Miss Ferdinand

* Linkage is inbred 4S x 5D to the stallion Man o' War, meaning that he appears fourth generation on the sire side of his pedigree and fifth generation (via Hard Tack) on the dam side of his pedigree.
