= Vineland Handicap =

American Thoroughbred horse race

The Vineland Handicap was an American Thoroughbred horse race run at Garden State Park Racetrack in Cherry Hill, New Jersey. Open to horses age three and older, it was contested on turf over a distance of a mile and a sixteenth.

Inaugurated in 1942, the Vineland Handicap was last run in 1999 when that year's American Champion Female Turf Horse, Soaring Softly won. On March 18, 2000, the Philadelphia Inquirer reported that the Vineland Handicap had been cancelled due to financial restraints. The track closed in 2001.
