= Jane du Pont Lunger =

- Born: June 20, 1914; Wilmington, Delaware, US
- Died: September 18, 2001 (aged 87); Wilmington, Delaware, US
- Occupations: Racehorse owner/breeder, Philanthropist
- Political party: Republican Party
- Spouse: Harry William Lunger (1905–1976)
- Children: David Lunger, Brett Lunger, Annie Lunger and 2 others.
- Parent(s): Philip Francis du Pont (1878-1928) & Elizabeth Horner (d. 1964)
- Honors: Honored Lady Guest, Thoroughbred Club of America (1980)

Jane du Pont Lunger (June 20, 1914 - September 18, 2001) was an American heiress, philanthropist, and an owner/breeder of Thoroughbred racehorses. A sixth-generation member of Delaware's prominent Du Pont family, her father, Philip Francis du Pont, was a major benefactor to the University of Virginia.

== Personal life ==
In 1934, Jane du Pont married Harry W. Lunger (1905–1976) who worked at All American Aviation Company, a company founded by Richard du Pont and based in Wilmington, Delaware. During 1936-1937 the Lungers built "Oberod," a stone mansion on rural acreage at 400 Burnt Mill Road in the Brandywine River Valley about 8 miles from downtown Wilmington, Delaware. Oberod is now owned by the Wilmington-base LabWare corporation, who use it as a training facility and to host special events. Her son Brett Lunger was a Formula One, Formula 5000 and Can-Am racing driver.

=== Philanthropy ===
In 2005, the Jane du Pont Lunger Residual Charitable Trust donated $250,000 to the Grayson-Jockey Club Research Foundation, Inc. which underwrites veterinary research projects dedicated to the well being of horses. Her estate and family are major contributors to the Delaware Art Museum.

== Christiana Stables ==
In 1937, Jane and Harry Lunger established Christiana Stables, named for the community of Christiana, Delaware. Their first trainer was Selby Burch, son of U.S. Racing Hall of Fame inductee, William Burch. Next, John Healey, son of Hall of Fame trainer Thomas J. Healey, took charge of Christiana Stables but he died at age 43 in 1947. Future U.S. Racing Hall of Fame inductee Henry Clark took over and remained with the Lungers into the 1980s. He was followed by James Maloney, William Badgett Jr. and then James W. Murphy.

The Lungers raced some 45 stakes winners, many of which they bred themselves. Among their successful runners were Miss Ferdinand, Cyane, Dance Spell, Endine, Light Hearted, Obeah, Salem, and Thinking Cap.

Following the 1976 death of her husband, Jane Lunger continued racing and breeding and enjoyed success with horses such as 1982 Blue Grass Stakes winner, Linkage. In 1986, Jane Lunger sent her mare Obeah to Windfields Farm in Maryland where she was bred to Deputy Minister. The mating resulted in the April 6, 1987 birth of Christiana Stables' greatest foal. A filly Mrs. Lunger named Go For Wand was born at Walnut Green Farm in Unionville, Pennsylvania owned by her son-in-law, Richard I.G. Jones. After a stellar year in which Go For Wand won the 1989 Breeders' Cup Juvenile Fillies she was voted American Champion Two-Year-Old Filly. In 1990 she won six Grade 1 races and earned her second Eclipse Award as the American Champion Three-Year-Old Filly. Go For Wand suffered a catastrophic injury while leading down the homestretch in the 1990 Breeders' Cup Distaff and had to be humanely euthanized. She was inducted in the U.S. Racing Hall of Fame in 1996.

In 1980, Jane du Pont Lunger was recognized by the Thoroughbred Club of America as their Honored Lady Guest.

Jane du Pont Lunger was still significantly involved with racing and breeding at the time of her death in 2001 at age eighty-seven.
