= Delaware Park (casino) =

American thoroughbred horse track

Coordinates: 39°42′14.07″N 75°40′7.92″W

Delaware Park Racetrack

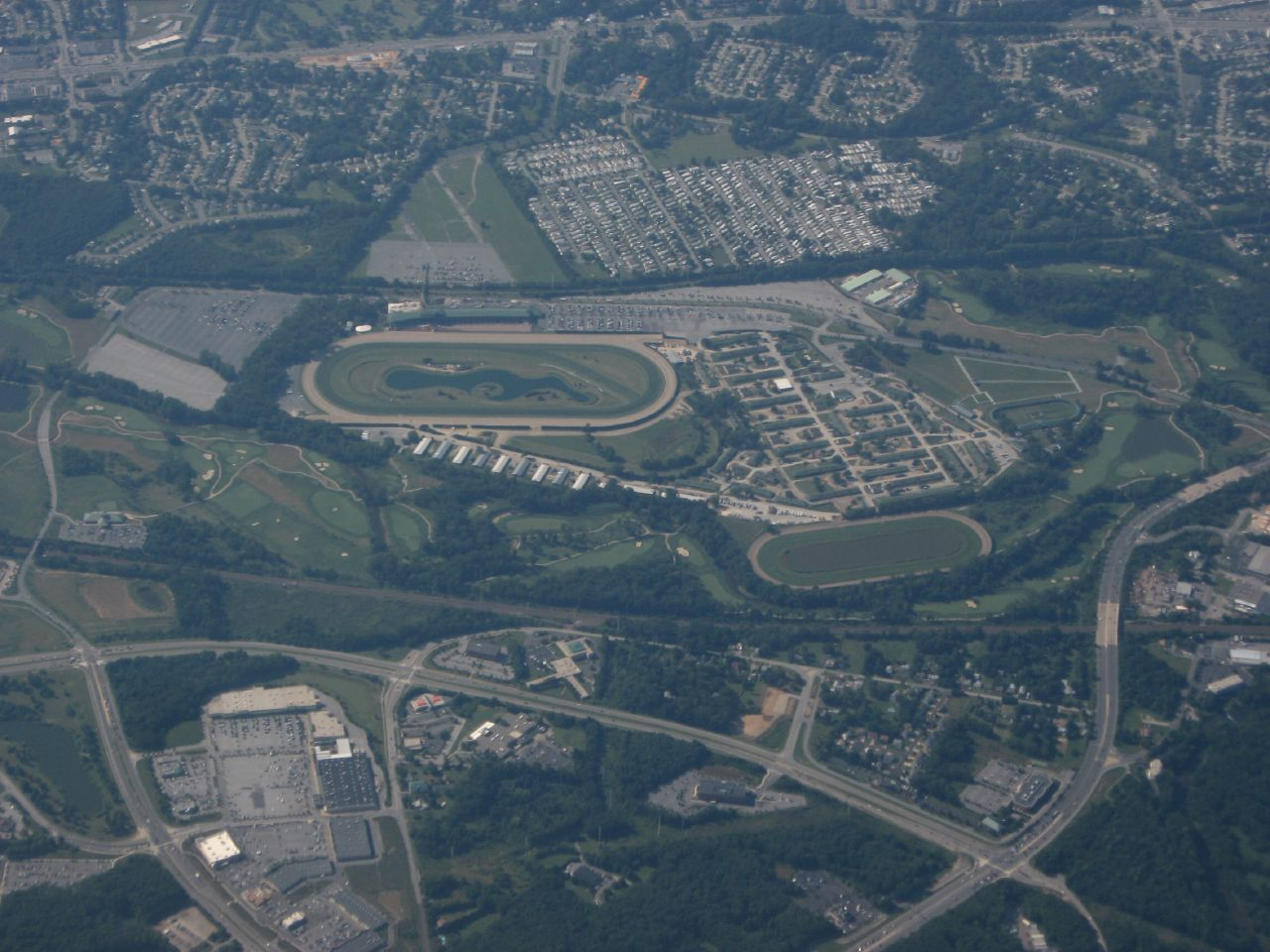
- Aerial view of Delaware Park Racetrack
- Interactive map of Delaware Park Racetrack
- Location: Stanton, Delaware, United States
- Owned by: Delaware Park LLC
- Date opened: 1937
- Race type: Thoroughbred – flat racing
- Notable races: Delaware Handicap (G2); Delaware Oaks (G3); Robert G. Dick Memorial Stakes (G3)

Delaware Park (also known as DelPark) is an American Thoroughbred horse racing track, casino, and golf course in Stanton, Delaware. It is located just outside the city of Wilmington, and about 30 miles from Philadelphia.

== Thoroughbred racing ==
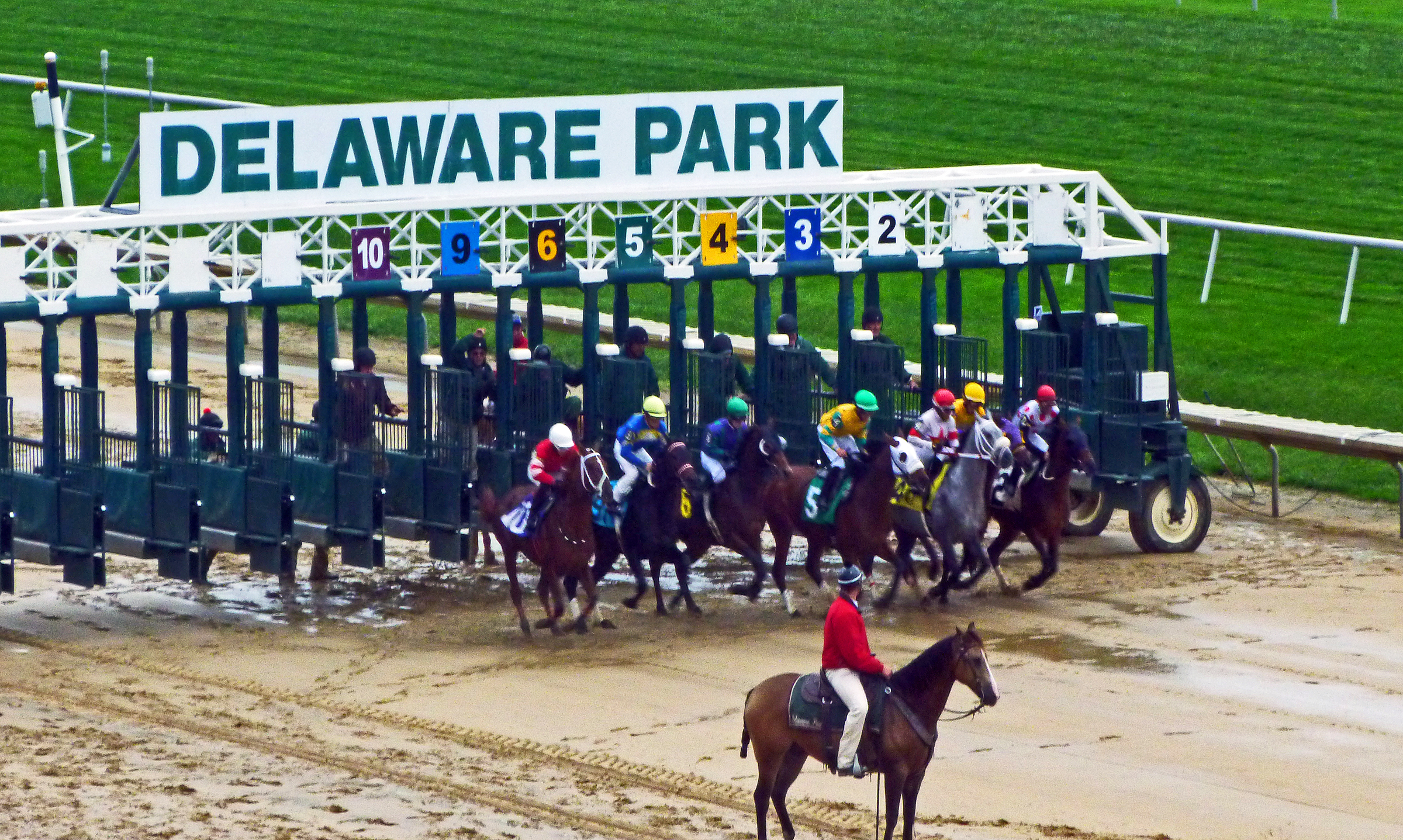
A race begins on a rainy fall day at Delaware Park.

William duPont, Jr. a designer of twenty-three racing courses, designed and built Delaware Park Racetrack in partnership with Donald P. Ross. Phillip T. Harris of Media, PA., was hired as the architectural engineer. The facility opened on June 26, 1937, and today is the only thoroughbred horse racing track in the state of Delaware. Races are run from May to October.

Race purses have increased in recent years owing to increasing casino revenues. With the United States national average horse racing purse of $20,762 in 2005, the average 2005 purse for DelPark of $30,650 has helped to attract more talented contenders and more first-time competitors to the venue for the 2005 and 2006 racing seasons. The 2005 average purse for DelPark placed Delaware fifth among states of the United States; the first rank for average purse was held by New York at $41,229 per race.

In recent years, near-Triple Crown winner Afleet Alex and Kentucky Derby winner Barbaro, both won their career debuts at Delaware (Barbaro did it on the grass at 7–1), and the sprint champion mare Xtra Heat was based there. The track is now home to many horses who routinely ship to and win at the major circuits in New York, Florida and Kentucky.

Delaware Park was the last mid-Atlantic track to regularly card Arabian races, with the last Arabian races being held in 2021. The area has a strong Arabian and equestrian population. Michael Matz, Barbaro's trainer, won the silver medal in the equestrian events at the 1996 Summer Olympic Games in Atlanta, Georgia. Matz is one of several mid-Atlantic trainers to perform on the national stage, along with Barclay Tagg, perennial leading trainer Tim Ritchey and J. Larry Jones, trainer of 2007 Kentucky Derby runner-up Hard Spun, who is also based at Delaware Park. Jones also trained the ill-fated Eight Belles, who also broke her maiden at Delaware before going on to finish second in the 2008 Kentucky Derby prior to her untimely death post-race.

Delaware Park entries are drawn well in advance which often results in short fields after several late scratches. It is not uncommon to see four- or even three-horse fields at Delaware in bad weather. Small fields are an issue because Parx Racing (formerly Philadelphia Park Racetrack), Laurel Park Racecourse, Pimlico Race Course, Charles Town, Mountaineer, and Colonial Downs all run simultaneously. Delaware Park is not part of a racing circuit, but is instead a standalone track. During the off-season, horses who do not lay over for the spring meet often disperse to the above mid-Atlantic tracks, plus New York, while others go to Florida. Conversely, many Florida-based horses "summer" at Delaware.

Delaware Park also offers simulcasts of races from other tracks. Wagering on live and simulcast horse races is offered at the Sports Book at Delaware Park.

=== Graded events ===
The following Graded events are schedule to be held at Delaware Park in 2026:

Grade III:

- Delaware Handicap
- Delaware Oaks
- Robert G. Dick Memorial Stakes

== Casino ==
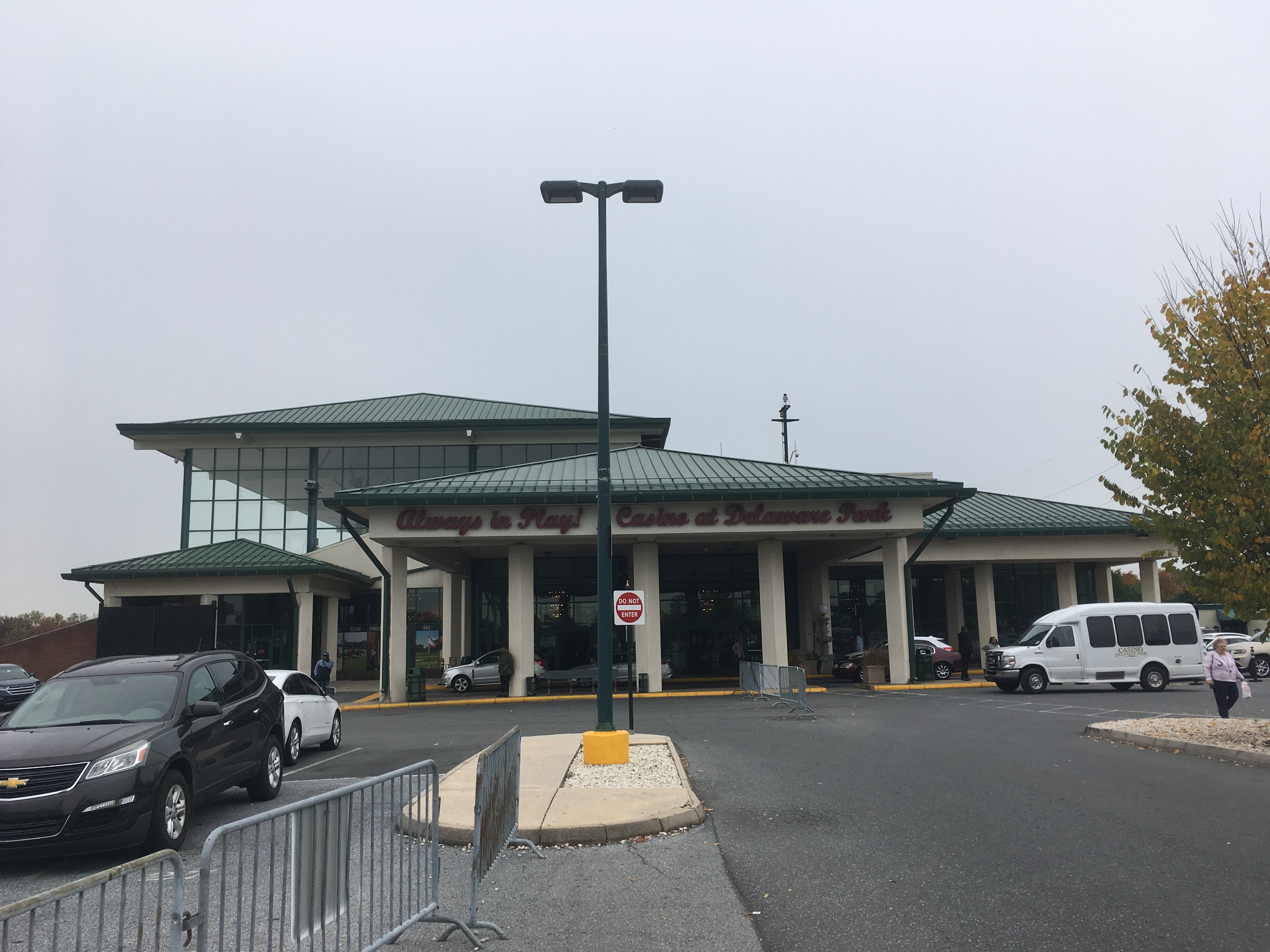
Casino at Delaware Park

The Casino at Delaware Park houses close to 2,500 slot machines. As of 2011, about 8,000 people gamble at the casino each day.

Betting on National Football League games was legalized in Delaware and made available at Delaware Park in 2009. Betting was only allowed on Parlay Cards featuring multiple teams, rather than individual games, along with championship futures. In 2018, sports betting was expanded to single-game and parlay betting on all professional and college sports (excluding Delaware college teams) including auto racing, baseball, basketball, boxing/MMA, football, golf, hockey, and soccer. Bets are made at the Sports Book located at Delaware Park, with football games televised at the Sports Book throughout the week in addition to the Sports Bar on Sundays. Live table games are offered after a new law allowing them was passed on January 28, 2010. Table games at Delaware Park include blackjack, craps, Mississippi stud, pai gow poker, various poker games, roulette, and Spanish 21. Delaware Park also offers keno at various locations in the casino.

== Golf ==
Delaware Park is home to an 18-hole, par 72 golf course called White Clay Creek Country Club. The golf course offers various membership options.

== Dining ==
Dining options at Delaware Park include:

- Legends Restaurant
- Picciotti's Pizza and Craft Beer
- Del Cap Room
- At The Rail Wine Bar and Grille
- On A Roll Deli
- Rooney's
- Kelso's Coffee Shop
- New Castle Room
- Sports Book
- The Grove at Delaware Park
- The Terrace

In addition, Delaware Park has facilities to accommodate banquets.

== Bars ==
Bars at Delaware Park include:

- Paddock Pub
- Hops
- Oval Bar
- Wheel Bar

== See also ==
- Racino
- List of casinos in Delaware
