= Runhappy =

American-bred Thoroughbred racehorse

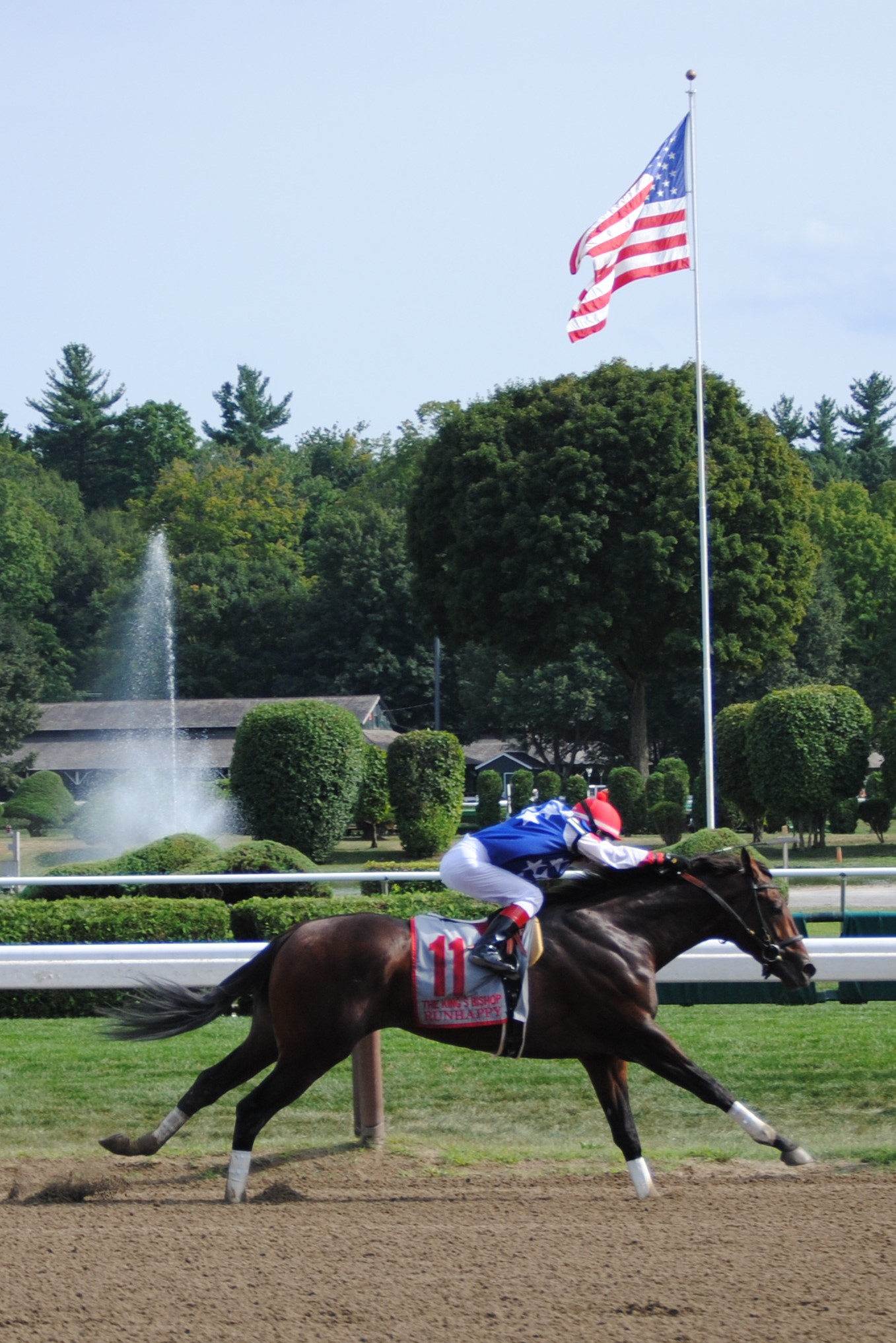
- Runhappy winning the 2015 King's Bishop Stakes
- Sire: Super Saver
- Grandsire: Maria's Mon
- Dam: Bella Jolie
- Damsire: Broken Vow
- Sex: Colt
- Foaled: March 4, 2012
- Country: United States
- Colour: Bay
- Breeder: Wayne, Gray and Bryan Lyster
- Owner: Jim McIngvale
- Trainer: Laura Wohlers; Maria Borell; Laura Wohlers
- Record: 10: 7–0–0
- Earnings: $1,496,250

Major wins
- King's Bishop Stakes (2015); Phoenix Stakes (2015); Breeders' Cup Sprint (2015); Malibu Stakes (2015)

Awards
- American Champion Sprint Horse (2015)

Honours
- Grade III Runhappy Stakes at Belmont Park (2018–2024)
- Last updated on 18 November 2025

Runhappy (foaled March 4, 2012) is a champion American Thoroughbred racehorse who was the 2015 American Champion Sprint Horse after winning six consecutive races including the King's Bishop Stakes, Phoenix Stakes, Breeders' Cup Sprint, and Malibu Stakes.

== Background ==
Runhappy is a bay horse bred in Kentucky by Wayne, Gray and Bryan Lyster. He is from the first crop of foals sired by Super Saver, the winner of the 2010 Kentucky Derby. Super Saver made a very promising start at stud, with his early progeny also including Competitive Edge (Hopeful Stakes) and Embellish The Lace (Alabama Stakes). Runhappy's dam Bella Jolie won two minor races at Delaware Park Racetrack in 2010. She was descended from Queen Nasra, a broodmare who was the ancestor of many important winners including Balanchine.

As a yearling the colt was consigned to the Keeneland Sales in September 2013 and was bought for $200,000 by Jim McIngvale, who made his fortune in the furniture business. The colt was initially sent into training with McIngvale's racing manager and sister-in-law Laura Wohlers.

== Racing career ==
=== 2014: Two-Year-Old Season ===
Runhappy made his first appearance in a maiden race at over six and a half furlongs on the synthetic track at Turfway Park in Kentucky on December 28. Ridden by Adrian Garcia he started second favorite in an eleven-runner field. He went to the front soon after the start and won by eight and a quarter lengths despite showing his inexperience by veering to the right in the straight.

=== 2015: Three-Year-Old Season ===
On his three-year-old debut, Runhappy was moved up in class for the Grade III Lecomte Stakes at Fair Grounds Race Course in New Orleans on January 17. He suffered at least two serious bumps from his opponents and finished ninth of the eleven runners behind International Star. After the race, Maria Borell took over from Wohlers as the colt's trainer.

On his first appearance for Borell, Runhappy won an allowance race over six furlongs on a sloppy track at Indiana Grand Race Course on July 7. On a fast track at Ellis Park Race Course later that month, he won a six and a half allowance, leading for most of the way to beat Springboard by two and three quarter lengths. In both races, he was ridden by Erin Walker.

Edgar Prado took over the ride when Runhappy was moved up sharply in class for the Grade I King's Bishop Stakes over seven furlongs at Saratoga Race Course on August 29. Before the race, Borell explained that she would not use the common race-day medication Lasix, saying, "I don't like drugs and I don't want to run on Lasix if a horse doesn't need it. Runhappy doesn't need it and he's run Lasix-free in all of his starts". Holy Boss, the winner of the Amsterdam Stakes, started as that race's public betting favorite. The other runners included Competitive Edge (Hopeful Stakes), March (Woody Stephens Stakes), Mr Z (Ohio Derby), and Grand Bili (Carry Back Stakes). Runhappy raced in second place before overtaking outsider Limousine Liberal after the first quarter mile. He maintained his advantage and then drew away from his rivals to win by four lengths from Limousine Liberal in a race record time of 1:20.54 with Holy Boss two lengths back in third. After the race, Prado commented, "The plan was to break good out of the gate. He was doing everything so easy and I was very confident in him going into the first turn. When he started pricking his ears and looking for competition, that made me feel good. When I asked him on the top of the stretch and he picked it up, I knew we were in good shape."

On October 2, the opening day of the Keeneland Fall meeting, Runhappy started 7/5 favorite for the Grade III Phoenix Stakes over six furlongs on a sloppy track. Holy Boss was again in opposition, but the main danger appeared to come from Work All Week, the reigning American Champion Sprint Horse. Ridden again by Prado, Runhappy led for most of the way and kept on in the straight to win by one and three quarter lengths from Hutcheson Stakes winner Brabados, with Work All Week taking third ahead of Holy Boss. After the race, Borell said, "He's very talented. He's an amazing horse. I'm so lucky and blessed to have him. Thank you so much, James McIngvale and Laura Wohlers. I'm so blessed." She also reiterated her stand on Lasix, saying, "We've never given him any drugs, and we're proud of that", while Laura Wohlers said, "Maria's very happy about being in a barn that doesn't believe in drugs. She's excited to train clean, and it's good to know he's out there running and that's him".

At Keeneland on October 31, Runhappy, ridden again by Prado, started 8/5 favorite in a fourteen-runner field for the Breeders' Cup Sprint. The multiple Grade I winner Private Zone was second in the betting ahead of Wild Dude (Santa Anita Sprint Championship), Salutos Amigos (Tom Fool Handicap), Limousine Liberal, Masochistic (Triple Bend Invitational Handicap), Kobe's Back (San Vicente Stakes), Big Macher (Bing Crosby Handicap), Holy Boss, and Barbados. Holy Boss took the early lead before Private Zone took over a quarter of a mile from the finish. Runhappy, however, had always been going well behind the leaders and ran on strongly in the closing stages to take the lead 75 yards from the finish and win by three quarters of a length from Private Zone in a track-record time of 1:08.58. Outsider Favorite Tale took third ahead of Holy Boss and Salutos Amigos. After the race, McIngvale said, "We're going to run him next year and see how he does and try to stretch him out [run over longer distance]. Should be a lot of fun. My favorite words are authentic, genuine, real, and transparent. I think if we're going to talk the talk and walk the walk, we've got to do it. No Lasix for us. No drugs. Just hay, oats, and lots of water".

McIngvale had a long history of summarily firing horse trainers, over 30 As of 2015, including Hall of Famers Bob Baffert and Bobby Frankel. After Borell was dismissed, Wohlers took over again as the colt's trainer. Runhappy was sent to California, where he won the Grade I Malibu Stakes on December 26, 2015, while giving five pounds to the field. His 3 1/2 lengths win was the first Grade I win for Wohlers. His connections stated after the race that they intended to race him in 2016 and attempt longer distances. In January 2016, Runhappy was named American Champion Sprint Horse for 2015 at the Eclipse Awards after taking 255 of the 261 votes. In the 2015 World's Best Racehorse Rankings, Runhappy was rated the joint fifth best sprinter in the world behind Able Friend, Muhaarar, Lankan Rupee, and Chautauqua.

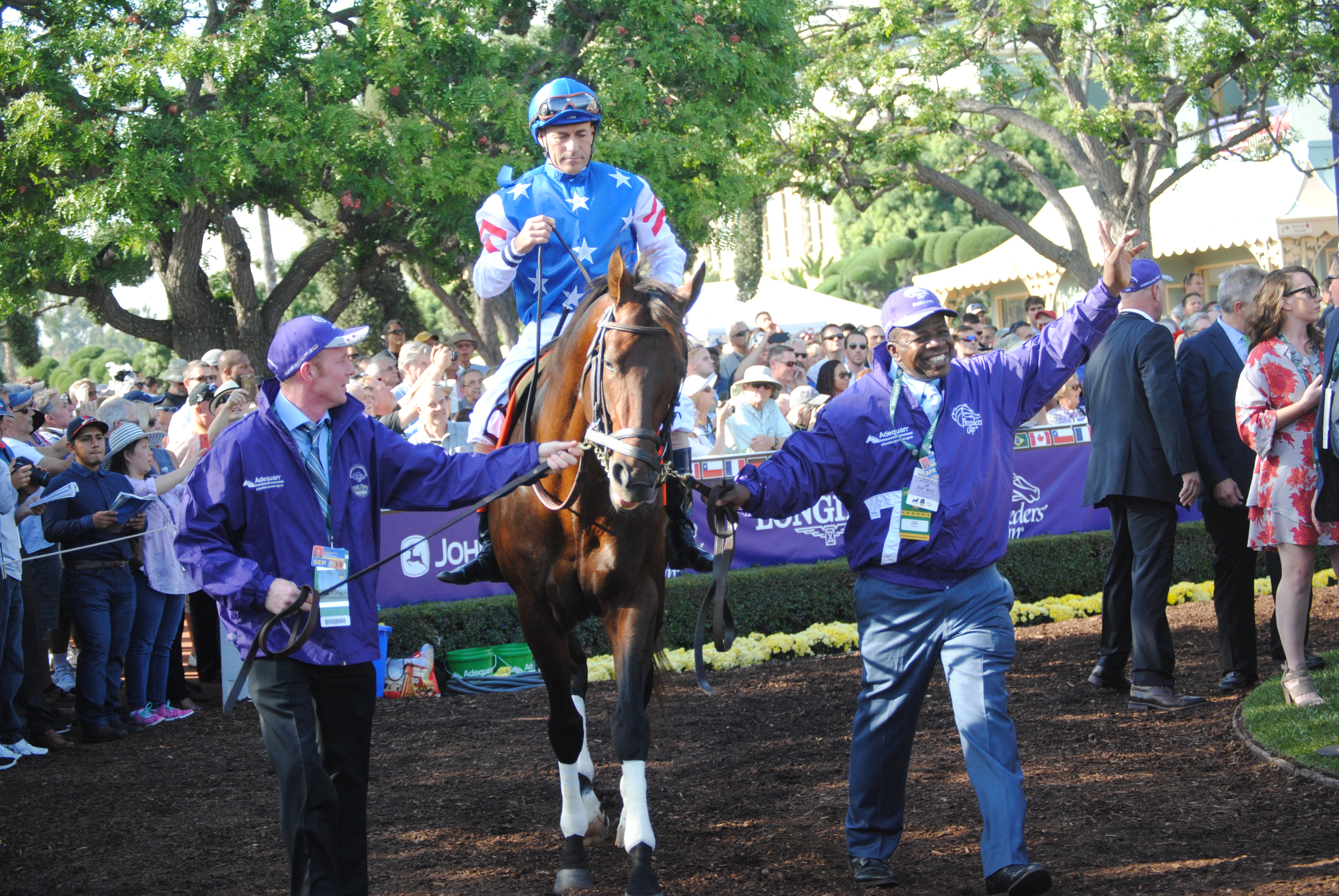
Runhappy at the 2016 Breeders' Cup

=== 2016: Four-Year-Old Season ===
On February 28, Runhappy returned to training, following a two-month break at a farm in Texas. He was initially targeting the Grade II Churchill Downs Stakes, but slight bruising on his right hind heel delayed his return to the races by a few weeks. He remained in light training with a protective bar shoe covering his bruised heel. On March 31, McIngvale announced that Runhappy would be pointed to the Grade I Metropolitan Mile. However, Runhappy's hoof bruise continued to limit his training into April, making it uncertain whether he would race. On April 13, Wohlers stated: "He galloped for us Sunday, and when we asked him to gallop again Monday, he kind of looked like he didn't want to, so we didn't push it. We'll just jog him until the end of the month and see where we are with him then." On June 11, Runhappy was diagnosed with a bone bruise on his right front cannon bone, putting him on the sidelines for 60 days. He returned to racing on October 1 in the Ack Ack Handicap at Churchill Downs, where he finished fourth. He then was sent to California for the 2016 Breeders' Cup, where he was entered in the Dirt Mile. Though he gained an initial lead in the race, he began to fade by the 3/4 pole and finished eighth out of nine horses. This would be his final start. Although McIngvale had paid $1 million to purchase a slot in the inaugural running of the Pegasus World Cup in January 2017, after the Breeders' Cup, he decided to retire Runhappy, who was sent to stand at stud at Claiborne Farm with an initial stud fee of $25,000.

== Stud career ==
Runhappy at Claiborne Farm

In 2023 Runhappy stood at Claiborne Farm for $15,000. On November 16, he stepped into the historic stall at Claiborne Farm which has housed other champion horses. The first stall on the left in the first barn has typically been reserved for other champions, such as Bold Ruler, Easy Goer, and Unbridled. Secretariat made his appearance there on November 12, 1973.

After standing for six years in the US, Runhappy had sired 241 winners and compiled progeny earnings in excess of $28 million he was sold to continue his stud career in South Korea.

=== Notable progeny ===
c = colt, f = filly, g = gelding

Foaled	Name	Sex	Major Wins
2021	Nutella Fella	c	Hopeful Stakes (2023)
2023	So Happy	c	Santa Anita Derby (2026)

== Honors ==
McIngvale tirelessly promotes Runhappy in racing ads, and Runhappy also became the title sponsor of the Kentucky Downs racing meet, which stages a short meet each summer on a European-style turf course. The meet is believed to be the first in the US to be sponsored by a racehorse, and one of the first to have a title sponsorship of any kind. The sponsorship was renewed in 2020.

In 2018, the Diablo Stakes, an annual Grade III American Thoroughbred horse race in New York City, was renamed the Runhappy Stakes in honor of the champion sprint horse.

== Pedigree ==
Pedigree of Runhappy (USA), bay colt, 2012
Sire Super Saver (USA) 2007	Maria's Mon (USA); 1993	Wavering Monarch	Majestic Light
Sire Super Saver (USA) 2007	Maria's Mon (USA); 1993	Wavering Monarch	Uncommitted
Sire Super Saver (USA) 2007	Maria's Mon (USA); 1993	Carlotta Maria	Caro
Sire Super Saver (USA) 2007	Maria's Mon (USA); 1993	Carlotta Maria	Water Malone
Sire Super Saver (USA) 2007	Supercharger (USA); 1995	A.P. Indy	Seattle Slew
Sire Super Saver (USA) 2007	Supercharger (USA); 1995	A.P. Indy	Weekend Surprise
Sire Super Saver (USA) 2007	Supercharger (USA); 1995	Get Lucky	Mr. Prospector
Sire Super Saver (USA) 2007	Supercharger (USA); 1995	Get Lucky	Dance Number
Dam Bella Jolie (USA) 2007	Broken Vow (USA); 1997	Unbridled	Fappiano
Dam Bella Jolie (USA) 2007	Broken Vow (USA); 1997	Unbridled	Gana Facil
Dam Bella Jolie (USA) 2007	Broken Vow (USA); 1997	Wedding Vow	Nijinsky
Dam Bella Jolie (USA) 2007	Broken Vow (USA); 1997	Wedding Vow	Wedding Picture
Dam Bella Jolie (USA) 2007	Jolie Boutique (USA); 1994	Northern Jove	Northern Dancer
Dam Bella Jolie (USA) 2007	Jolie Boutique (USA); 1994	Northern Jove	Junonia
Dam Bella Jolie (USA) 2007	Jolie Boutique (USA); 1994	Mimi la Sardine	Tank's Prospect
Dam Bella Jolie (USA) 2007	Jolie Boutique (USA); 1994	Mimi la Sardine	Fran Nasra (Family: 4-k)
