= Embellish the Lace =

American thoroughbred racehorse

- Sire: Super Saver
- Grandsire: Maria's Mon
- Dam: Expanse
- Damsire: Distant View
- Sex: Mare
- Foaled: 2012
- Country: USA
- Breeder: WinStar Farm, LLC
- Owner: Alex & JoAnn Lieblong
- Trainer: Anthony W. Dutrow
- Record: 6:3-0-0
- Earnings: $441,540

Major wins
- Alabama Stakes (2015)

Embellish the Lace (foaled March 8, 2012 in Kentucky) is an American Thoroughbred racemare who as a three-year-old in 2015 won the Grade 1 Alabama Stakes.

== Career ==
Embellish the Lace competed in her first race at Aqueduct Racetrack on November 16, 2014, where he finished in 5th.

She won her next two races at Parx Casino and Racing and at Pimlico Race Course on December 13, 2014, and on June 4, 2015.

Embellish the Lace's first and only major win came at the 2015 Alabama Stakes. Her next race would prove to be her final as she suffered a leg injury when finishing fifth in the 2015 Cotillion Handicap. She was then sold to China Horse Club International in the fall of 2016.

== Pedigree ==
Pedigree of Embellish the Lace (USA), 2012
Sire Super Saver (USA) 2007	Maria's Mon (USA); 1993	Wavering Monarch (USA)	Majestic Light
Sire Super Saver (USA) 2007	Maria's Mon (USA); 1993	Wavering Monarch (USA)	Uncommitted
Sire Super Saver (USA) 2007	Maria's Mon (USA); 1993	Carlotta Maria (USA)	Caro
Sire Super Saver (USA) 2007	Maria's Mon (USA); 1993	Carlotta Maria (USA)	Water Malone
Sire Super Saver (USA) 2007	Supercharger (USA); 1995	A.P. Indy (USA)	Seattle Slew
Sire Super Saver (USA) 2007	Supercharger (USA); 1995	A.P. Indy (USA)	Weekend Surprise
Sire Super Saver (USA) 2007	Supercharger (USA); 1995	Get Lucky (USA)	Mr. Prospector
Sire Super Saver (USA) 2007	Supercharger (USA); 1995	Get Lucky (USA)	Dance Number
Dam Expanse (USA) 1997	Distant View (USA); 1991	Mr. Prospector (USA)	Raise a Native
Dam Expanse (USA) 1997	Distant View (USA); 1991	Mr. Prospector (USA)	Gold Digger
Dam Expanse (USA) 1997	Distant View (USA); 1991	Seven Springs (USA)	Irish River
Dam Expanse (USA) 1997	Distant View (USA); 1991	Seven Springs (USA)	La Trinite
Dam Expanse (USA) 1997	Dial a Trick (USA); 1990	Phone Trick (USA)	Clever Trick
Dam Expanse (USA) 1997	Dial a Trick (USA); 1990	Phone Trick (USA)	Over the Phone
Dam Expanse (USA) 1997	Dial a Trick (USA); 1990	Ice Fantasy (USA)	It's Freezing
Dam Expanse (USA) 1997	Dial a Trick (USA); 1990	Ice Fantasy (USA)	Donna's Answer
