= Bluegrass Cat =

American-bred Thoroughbred racehorse

- Sire: Storm Cat
- Dam: She's a Winner
- Damsire: A.P. Indy
- Sex: Stallion
- Foaled: 2003
- Country: United States
- Colour: Bay
- Breeder: WinStar Farm
- Owner: WinStar Farm
- Trainer: Todd Pletcher
- Record: 11: 5-4-0
- Earnings: $1,761,280

Major wins
- Nashua Stakes (2005); Remsen Stakes (2005); Sam F Davis Stakes (2006); Haskell Invitational Handicap (2006) American Classic Race placing: Kentucky Derby 2nd (2006); Belmont Stakes 2nd (2006)
- Last updated on November 4, 2006

Bluegrass Cat (foaled January 23, 2003) is an American thoroughbred race horse. Although he won several major stakes races, he is best known for finishing second in both the 2006 Kentucky Derby and Belmont Stakes.

== Background ==
Bluegrass Cat was bred by WinStar Farm in Versailles, Kentucky and raced under their colors as a homebred. He is by leading American sire Storm Cat, while his dam She's a Winner belongs to "the best family on earth", descending from La Troienne through Numbered Account.

He was trained by Hall of Famer Todd Pletcher. His jockey was John Velazquez except in the Kentucky Derby, where Ramon Dominguez picked up the mount after Velazquez suffered a serious injury two weeks before the race.

== Racing career ==
=== 2005: Two-year-old season ===
Bluegrass Cat made his debut on June 24 in a maiden race at Churchill Downs, finishing eighth after being bumped hard at the start. On September 24, he broke his maiden by 6 1/2 lengths in his second lifetime start in a seven-furlong race at Belmont Park. In his third career race, he won the one mile Nashua Stakes, also at Belmont. "What I loved about the race today was that he was in behind horses, and got an education," said Pletcher. "He had to make room for himself at the top of the stretch and pushed his way through."

In his final start at age two on November 26, he won the 1 1/8-mile Remsen Stakes at Aqueduct Racetrack. In his first two-turn race, he prevailed by 1 3/4 lengths after being challenged by Flashy Bull in the stretch. "He's quite a fighter," said Velazquez. "He was a little spooked at the end of the race when he saw a tire track. But, he's a nice horse, and I look forward to next year."

=== 2006: Three-year-old season ===
Bluegrass Cat started his three-year-old campaign at Tampa Bay Downs in the Sam F. Davis Stakes on February 16. He won by 1 1/4 lengths in a good time of 1:44.17 for 1 1/16 miles, less than 1 second off the track record. On March 18, Bluegrass Cat was the 2-5 favorite in the Tampa Bay Derby but lost his footing on the far turn and finished second to Deputy Glitters, a horse he had defeated in the Sam Davis. Bluegrass Cat next entered the Blue Grass Stakes at Keeneland on April 15, where he was badly beaten by front running Sinister Minister. Pletcher felt the loss may have been due to the Keeneland surface, which had shown a speed bias that favored horses on the lead.

In the 2006 Kentucky Derby on May 6, Bluegrass Cat was a 30-1 longshot in a field of 20. For the first 3/4 of a mile, he raced in fifth or sixth a few lengths behind the leaders, with Barbaro just ahead on the outside. On the far turn, Barbaro made his move, eventually winning by 6 1/2 lengths. Bluegrass Cat could not match Barbaro's acceleration but was good enough to finish second by two lengths over Steppenwolfer, with Jazil and Brother Derek in a dead heat for fourth another length back. Bluegrass Cat's connections skipped the Preakness Stakes, won by Bernardini after Barbaro's tragic breakdown, and rested him for the Belmont Stakes. When Bernardini skipped the Belmont Stakes, Bluegrass Cat became the second choice in a wide-open field of twelve. He raced just behind the early pace and made his move on the far turn, but was out-kicked by Jazil and finished second.

After a brief rest, Bluegrass Cat next ran in the Haskell Invitational at Monmouth Park on August 6. Racing just off the pace for the first 3/4 miles, he made a "devastating" move coming into the stretch and drew off to win by seven lengths. "We're delighted with his effort," said Pletcher. "His performance today is as good as any 3-year-old's this year. To win a grade one as significant as the Haskell puts him in the elite category."

In the Travers Stakes on August 26, Bluegrass Cat finished second to Bernardini, who won by 7 1/2 lengths. Although he seemed to come out of the race in good shape, the next morning he was found to be lame in his right hind pastern. X-rays showed he had a nondisplaced fracture, which his connections believe occurred in the latter part of the Travers. "It's obviously very disappointing when you have your leading earner and top 3-year-old injured, but it emphasizes that this is a horse with tremendous quality and tremendous courage," stated Pletcher. "To get injured in a race like that and still run as well as he did and continue trying just emphasizes the quality of horse he is."

Bluegrass Cat was retired from racing with five wins and four places out of eleven starts, and earnings of $1,761,280.

=== Statistics ===
Date	Race	Distance	Track	Grade	Winning Time	Finish	Margin	Condition	Ref
Jun 4, 2005	Maiden	4.5 furlongs	Churchill Downs	maiden	:53.08	8th	(8 3/4 lengths)	Fast	
Sep 24, 2005	Maiden	7 furlongs	Belmont Park	maiden	1:23.62	1st	6 1/2 lengths	Fast	
Oct 28, 2005	Nashua Stakes	8 furlongs	Belmont Park	III	1:36.02	1st	1 1/2 lengths	Fast	
Nov 26, 2005	Remsen Stakes	9 furlongs	Aqueduct Racetrack	II	1:52.20	1st	1 3/4 lengths	Fast	
Feb 18, 2006	Sam F Davis Stakes	8.5 furlongs	Tampa Bay Downs	listed	1:44.17	1st	1 1/4 lengths	Fast	
Mar 18, 2006	Tampa Bay Derby	8.5 furlongs	Tampa Bay Downs	III	1:44.26	2nd	(2 lengths)	Fast	
Apr 15, 2006	Blue Grass Stakes	9 furlongs	Keeneland Race Course	I	1:48.85	4th	(21 1/4 lengths)	Fast	
May 6, 2006	Kentucky Derby	10 furlongs	Churchill Downs	I	2:01.36	2nd	(6 1/2 lengths)	Fast	
Jun 10, 2006	Belmont Stakes	12 furlongs	Belmont Park	I	2:27.86	2nd	(1 1/4 lengths)	Fast	
Aug 6, 2006	Haskell Invitational Handicap	9 furlongs	Monmouth Park Racetrack	I	1:48.85	1st	7 lengths)	Fast	
Aug 26, 2006	Travers Stakes	10 furlongs	Saratoga Race Course	I	2:01.60	2nd	(7 1/2 lengths)	Fast	

== Stud career ==
Bluegrass Cat was retired to stud for the 2007 season at WinStar Farm, where his initial fee was $50,000. Because of the economic downturn in 2008, his fee subsequently declined to $25,000. He got off to a fast start when his first crop reached racing age in 2010, with seven winners by July, all of them reinforcing Bluegrass Cat's linebreeding to La Troienne. He eventually finished second on the freshman sire list with two graded stakes winners including Kathmanblu, his leading earner.

In the 2011 second-crop sire listing, Bluegrass Cat finished second behind Bernardini but was moved to New York for the 2012 season in partnership with Vinery Stud. After being the leading sire in New York for 2013 and 2014, he was relocated to Ballena Vista stud in California for the 2015 season. He finished 2015 as the number 1 ranked sire in California.

Bluegrass Cat's descendants include:

c = colt, f = filly

Foaled	Name	Sex	Major Wins
2008	Blue Laser	c	Grey Stakes
2009	Go Blue Or Go Home	c	Highlander Stakes
2009	Sabercat	c	Delta Jackpot Stakes, Garden State Stakes
2009	Teeth of the Dog	c	Dwyer Stakes
2012	Kathballu	c	Pan Zareta Stakes
2013	Flexibility	c	Jerome Stakes
2013	Cozze Cat	c	Delaware Park

== Pedigree ==
Bluegrass Cat's sire Storm Cat was one of the most important American stallions of the late 20th century and early 21st century. Although he started at stud with low expectations, by the end of his career his fee was $500,000, the highest in North America. Storm Cat was the leading sire in North America for 1999 and 2000, and led the juvenile (two-year-old) sire list a record seven times. His offspring tended to be precocious and fast, but sometimes inherited his offset knees, making them vulnerable to injury.

Bluegrass Cat's dam She's a Winner was unraced but was descended from a high quality family. Bred by Ogden Phipps, she was privately purchased by WinStar Farms and produced 7 winners from 12 named foals. In late 2006, WinStar Farm purchased her full sister Supercharger in foal to Maria's Mon for $160,000: The resulting colt was 2010 Kentucky Derby winner Super Saver. Both She's a Winner and Supercharger were out of stakes winner Get Lucky, who was out of stakes winner Dance Number, who was out of stakes winner and Champion Numbered Account. Bluegrass Cat has a total of five strains of the highly influential mare La Troienne: two through Numbered Account, two through Seattle Slew's dam My Charmer and one through A.P. Indy's dam Weekend Surprise.

Pedigree of Bluegrass Cat, bay colt, 2003
Sire Storm Cat 1983	Storm Bird; 1978	Northern Dancer	Nearctic
Sire Storm Cat 1983	Storm Bird; 1978	Northern Dancer	Natalma
Sire Storm Cat 1983	Storm Bird; 1978	South Ocean	New Providence
Sire Storm Cat 1983	Storm Bird; 1978	South Ocean	Shining Sun
Sire Storm Cat 1983	Terlingua; 1976	Secretariat	Bold Ruler
Sire Storm Cat 1983	Terlingua; 1976	Secretariat	Somethingroyal
Sire Storm Cat 1983	Terlingua; 1976	Crimson Saint	Crimson Satan
Sire Storm Cat 1983	Terlingua; 1976	Crimson Saint	Bolero Rose
Dam She's a Winner 1996	A.P. Indy; 1989	Seattle Slew	Bold Reasoning
Dam She's a Winner 1996	A.P. Indy; 1989	Seattle Slew	My Charmer
Dam She's a Winner 1996	A.P. Indy; 1989	Weekend Surprise	Secretariat
Dam She's a Winner 1996	A.P. Indy; 1989	Weekend Surprise	Lassie Dear
Dam She's a Winner 1996	Get Lucky; 1988	Mr. Prospector	Raise A Native
Dam She's a Winner 1996	Get Lucky; 1988	Mr. Prospector	Gold Digger
Dam She's a Winner 1996	Get Lucky; 1988	Dance Number	Northern Dancer
Dam She's a Winner 1996	Get Lucky; 1988	Dance Number	Numbered Account (family: 1-x)

Bluegrass Cat is inbred 3s x 4d to both Secretariat and Northern Dancer, meaning these stallions each appear in the 3rd generation of the sire's side of his pedigree and in the 4th generation of the dam's side.
