= So Happy (horse) =

American racehorse

- Sire: Runhappy
- Grandsire: Super Saver
- Dam: So Cunning
- Damsire: Blame
- Sex: Colt
- Foaled: April 26, 2023
- Country: United States
- Color: Bay
- Breeder: Leverett S. Miller
- Owner: Norman Stables & Saints or Sinners
- Trainer: Mark Glatt
- Record: 4: 3 - 0 - 1
- Earnings: US$480,000

Major wins
- San Vicente Stakes (2026); Santa Anita Derby (2026)
- Last updated on April 21, 2026

So Happy (foaled April 26, 2023) is a Grade I winning American Thoroughbred racehorse who won the 2026 Santa Anita Derby.

== Background ==
So Happy is a bay colt who was bred in Kentucky by Leverett S. Miller and is out his of a lightly raced mare, So Cunning. So Cunning's sire is Blame, the 2010 American Champion Older Male Horse.

So Cunning descends from the winning Staff Writer mare So Divine. So Divine was the first filly that Miller bought his wife, Linda after they married and many of the offspring the couple owned in partnership, or she owned herself, have carried the word "So" in their names. An average racehorse, So Divine went on to be a solid producer. Included in her progeny was 1996 Grade III Virginia Handicap at Calder Race Course winner Race Artist, multiple stakes winner So Dashing, stakes winner So Charming, and So Frank, who set track records at Bluegrass Downs in Paducah, Kentucky for both one and two miles.

So Happy's sire is Runhappy, the 2015 US Sprint Champion who won the Grade I Breeders' Cup Sprint that year. Runhappy was sold in 2025 for stud duties in South Korea.

So Happy had initially been sold for $12,000 as a weanling at the 2023 Keeneland November Breeding Stock Sale and $20,000 as a yearling at the 2024 Fasig-Tipton Kentucky Fall Yearling Sale. Trainer Michael Glatt bought the colt as an agent for $150,000 at the 2025 Ocala Breeders' Sales March Sale of 2-Year-Olds in Training for Hans and Ana Maron's Saints or Sinners and Robert Norman's Norman Stables.

== Statistics ==
Date	Distance	Race	Grade	Track	Odds	Field	Finish	Winning Time	Winning (Losing) Margin	Jockey	Ref
2025 – Two-year-old season
Nov 22, 2025	6 1/2 furlongs	Maiden Special Weight		Del Mar	38.00	10	1	1:10.71	3/4 length	Mike E. Smith	
2026 – Three-year-old season
Jan 10, 2026	7 furlongs	San Vicente Stakes	II	Santa Anita	2.90	5	1	1:21.12	2 lengths	Mike E. Smith	
Feb 26, 2026	1 1/16 miles	San Felipe Stakes	II	Santa Anita	2.10	7	3	1:42.92	(2 1/4 lengths)	Mike E. Smith	
Apr 4, 2026	1 1/8 miles	Santa Anita Derby	I	Santa Anita	7.30	7	1	1:49.56	2 3/4 length	Mike E. Smith	
May 2, 2026	1 1/4 miles	Kentucky Derby	I	Churchill Downs	5.90	18	9	2:02.27	(7 1/2 lengths)	Mike E. Smith	

Notes:
An (*) asterisk after the odds means So Happy was the post-time favorite.

== Pedigree ==
Pedigree of So Happy, bay colt, April 26, 2023
Sire Runhappy (2012)	Super Saver (2007)	Maria's Mon (1993)	Wavering Monarch (1979)
Sire Runhappy (2012)	Super Saver (2007)	Maria's Mon (1993)	Carlotta Maria (1984)
Sire Runhappy (2012)	Super Saver (2007)	Supercharger (1995)	A.P. Indy (1989)
Sire Runhappy (2012)	Super Saver (2007)	Supercharger (1995)	Get Lucky (1988)
Sire Runhappy (2012)	Bella Jolie (2007)	Broken Vow (1997)	Unbridled (1987)
Sire Runhappy (2012)	Bella Jolie (2007)	Broken Vow (1997)	Wedding Vow (1988)
Sire Runhappy (2012)	Bella Jolie (2007)	Jolie Boutique (1994)	Northern Jove (1968)
Sire Runhappy (2012)	Bella Jolie (2007)	Jolie Boutique (1994)	Mimi la Sardine (1988)
Dam So Cunning (2016)	Blame (2008)	Arch (1995)	Kris S. (1977)
Dam So Cunning (2016)	Blame (2008)	Arch (1995)	Aurora (1988)
Dam So Cunning (2016)	Blame (2008)	Liable (1995)	Seeking The Gold (1985)
Dam So Cunning (2016)	Blame (2008)	Liable (1995)	Bound (1984)
Dam So Cunning (2016)	So Glitzy (2004)	Gilded Time (1990)	Timeless Moment (1970)
Dam So Cunning (2016)	So Glitzy (2004)	Gilded Time (1990)	Gilded Lily (1979)
Dam So Cunning (2016)	So Glitzy (2004)	So Ritzy (1995)	Darn the Alarm (1981)
Dam So Cunning (2016)	So Glitzy (2004)	So Ritzy (1995)	So Divine (1979) (family A15)
