= 2006 Belmont Stakes =

American horse race

138th Belmont Stakes
- Belmont Stakes
- Location: Belmont Park; Elmont, New York, U.S.
- Date: June 10, 2006
- Distance: 1 1/2 mi (12 furlongs; 2,414 m)
- Winning horse: Jazil
- Winning time: 2:27.86
- Final odds: 6.20 (to 1)
- Jockey: Fernando Jara
- Trainer: Kiaran McLaughlin
- Owner: Shadwell Stable
- Conditions: Fast
- Surface: Dirt

The 2006 Belmont Stakes was the 138th running of the Belmont Stakes. The race was held on June 10, 2006, and was won by Jazil; it was his second victory in eight career starts. The winners of the Kentucky Derby and Preakness Stakes did not compete.

== Pre-race ==
The 2006 Triple Crown series was marred by the injury of Barbaro, the brilliant winner of the Kentucky Derby, during the Preakness Stakes. In the following weeks, Barbaro had undergone surgery for a broken right ankle and was given a good chance at survival. On the day of the Belmont, the world's largest get-well card was set up for fans to sign – roughly 20,000 people did so.

The field for the Belmont was further weakened when Preakness winner Bernardini was not entered in the race. The colt had three races in quick succession and his connections felt he needed a break. It was the first time since 2000 that both the Derby and Preakness winners were missing from the Belmont. The last time before that had been in 1970.

With the absence of Barbaro and Bernardini, the race was considered wide open. Trainer Todd Pletcher had a strong hand with Kentucky Derby runner-up Bluegrass Cat and Peter Pan winner Sunriver. Bob and John, who had won the Wood Memorial earlier in the year, had trained brilliantly at Santa Anita, while Steppenwolfer had put in a "spectacular" workout at Belmont. Jazil, trained by Kiaran McLaughlin, was also given a good chance after his late-closing fourth-place finish in the Kentucky Derby despite having only won one race.

== Race description ==
Bob and John broke well and set a quick early pace, followed closely by High Finance and Deputy Glitters. Bluegrass Cat was not far behind the early leaders, while Jazil trailed the field. The horses maintained their positions down the backstretch, then Jazil and Bluegrass Cat started to make up ground together around the far turn. The early leaders started to fall back and Jazil pulled into the lead. Bluegrass Cat could not match Jazil's pace but was clearly second best. Sunriver made up ground late to get third place.

It was the first Belmont win for all of Jazil's connections. "It is very hard to describe my feeling," said McLaughlin. "The people at Shadwell have been my biggest supporters for the last 12 years. It's great to win this race for your favorite people."

== Chart ==
| Finish | Program Number | Horse | Margin (lengths) | Jockey | Trainer | Post Time Odds | Winnings |
|---|---|---|---|---|---|---|---|
| 1st | 8 | Jazil | 1 1/4 | Fernando Jara | Kiaran McLaughlin | 6.20 | 600,000 |
| 2nd | 9 | Bluegrass Cat | 2 1/4 | John Velazquez | Todd Pletcher | 4.90 | 200,000 |
| 3rd | 2 | Sunriver | 1 1/4 | Rafael Bejarano | Todd Pletcher | 6.00 | 110,000 |
| 4th | 11 | Steppenwolfer | 5 | Robby Albarado | Daniel Pietz | 4.80 | 60,000 |
| 5th | 6 | Oh So Awesome | 2 | Mike E. Smith | James A. Jerkens | 12.00 | 30,000 |
| 6th | 3 | Hemingway's Key | 4 1/2 | Jeremy Rose | Nick Zito | 15.10 | |
| 7th | 1 | Platinum Couple | 2 1/2 | Jose L. Espinoza | Joseph Lostritto | 38.00 | |
| 8th | 4 | Bob and John | 4 1/4 | Garrett K. Gomez | Bob Baffert | 4.70 | |
| 9th | 12 | Sacred Light | 6 1/2 | Victor Espinoza | David Hofmans | 26.50 | |
| 10th | 5 | High Finance | 11 1/4 | Eibar Coa | Richard Violette Jr. | 10.40 | |
| 11th | 7 | Deputy Glitters | | Edgar Prado | Thomas Albertrani | 12.20 | |
| DNF (Note: Did Not Finish) | 10 | Double Galore | | Mike Luzzi | Myung Kwon Cho | 46.75 | |

Source: Equibase
Times: 1/4 – 0:23.02; 1/2 – 0:47.36; 3/4 – 1:12.14; mile – 1:37.53; 1 1/4 – 2:02.69; final – 2:27.86.
Fractional Splits: (:23.02) (:24.34) (:24.78) (:25.39) (:25.16) (:25.17)

== Payout ==
138th Belmont Payout Schedule:

| Program Number | Horse | Win | Place | Show |
|---|---|---|---|---|
| 8 | Jazil | 14.40 | 6.70 | 4.70 |
| 9 | Bluegrass Cat | | 6.40 | 4.70 |
| 2 | Sunriver | | | 6.10 |

- $2 Exacta (8-9) Paid $92.00
- $2 Trifecta (8-9-2) Paid $436.00
- $2 Superfecta (8-9-2-11) Paid $1,085.00
