= 2006 Kentucky Derby =

Horse race

132nd Kentucky Derby
- Kentucky Derby; Presented by Yum! Brands
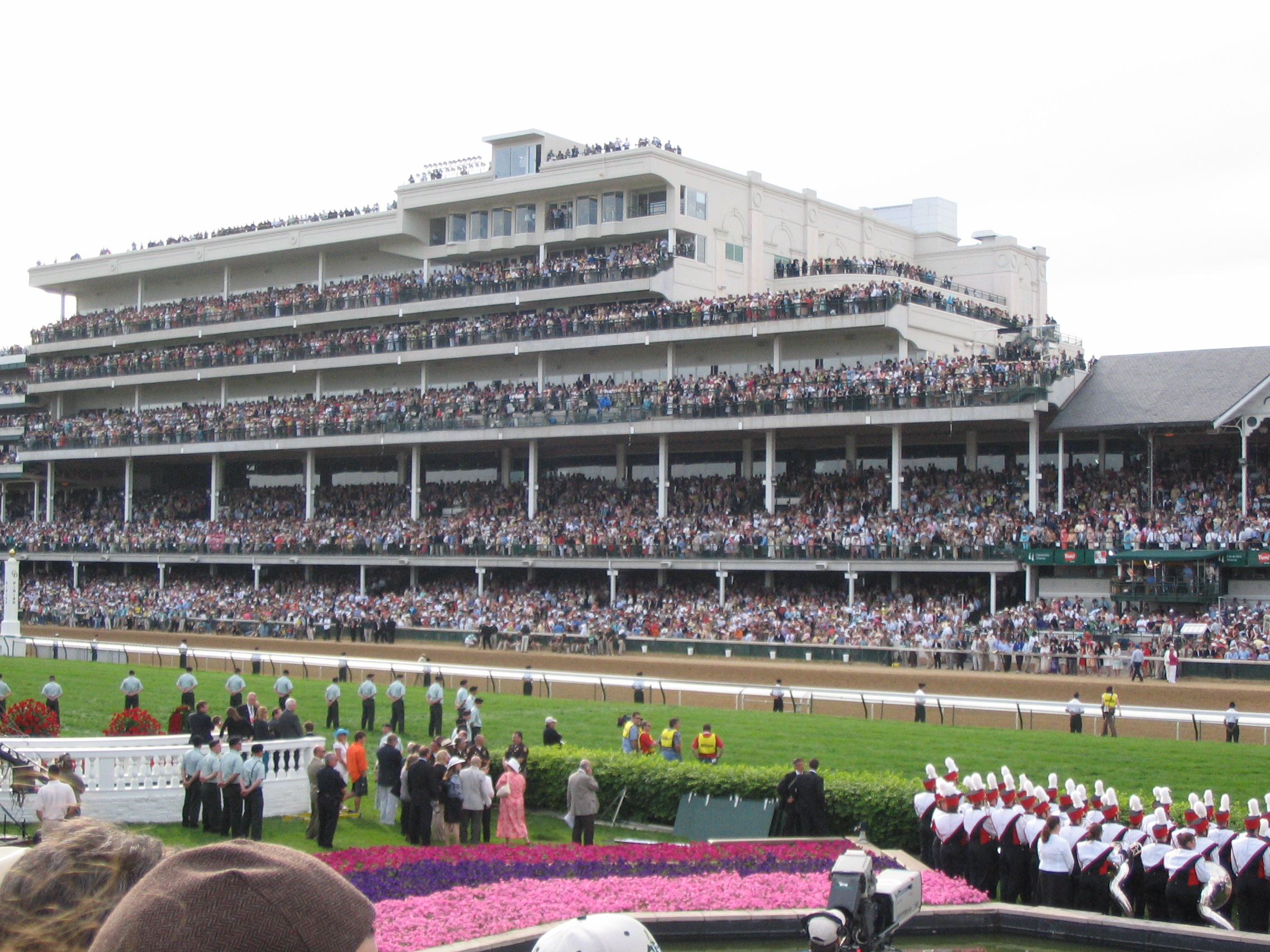
- Location: Churchill Downs
- Date: May 6, 2006
- Winning horse: Barbaro
- Winning time: 2:01.36
- Starting price: 6:1
- Jockey: Edgar Prado
- Trainer: Michael R. Matz
- Owner: Lael Stables
- Conditions: Fast
- Surface: Dirt
- Attendance: 157,532

The 2006 Kentucky Derby was the 132nd running of the Kentucky Derby. The race took place on May 6, 2006, and was won by Barbaro. There was a crowd of 157,532 in attendance.

== Contenders ==
Viewed as one of the most competitive fields in years, there was no clear cut standout going into the race. Brother Derek, winner of four straight including the Santa Anita Derby, was made the morning line favorite at odds of 3:1 but drifted out to nearly 8:1 by post time. Meanwhile, Sweetnorthernsaint went from 10:1 on the morning line to the post-time favorite at 11:2 off of his win in the Illinois Derby. At 6:1, Barbaro was the second favorite based on his undefeated record including the Florida Derby. He was attempting to become the first horse since Needles in 1950 to win the Derby off of a five-week layoff. Other leading contenders included Lawyer Ron (Arkansas Derby), Showing Up (Lexington Stakes) and Sinister Minister (Blue Grass Stakes).

== Results ==
Keyed Entry went to the early lead challenged by Sinister Minister, and set a fast early pace. Barbaro stumbled at the start and bumped with Bob and John, then was carried three wide into the first turn. Still racing wide, he started to make up ground on the far turn and hit the lead with a quarter of a mile remaining. He continued to open up ground and won by 6 1/2 lengths over Bluegrass Cat, with Steppenwolfer closing late for third. Jazil and Brother Derek deadheated for fourth.

It was the first Derby winner for all of Barbaro's connections: trainer Michael Matz, jockey Edgar Prado and owners Roy and Gretchen Jackson of Lael Stable. Barbaro's margin of victory was the longest since Assault in 1946. He became just the sixth horse to win the Derby while still undefeated.

| Finish | Post | Horse | Jockey | Trainer | Odds | Margin | Earnings |
|---|---|---|---|---|---|---|---|
| 1 | 8 | Barbaro | Edgar Prado | Michael Matz | 6.10 | | $1,453,200 |
| 2 | 13 | Bluegrass Cat | Ramon Domínguez | Todd Pletcher | 30.00 | 6 1/2 lengths | $400,000 |
| 3 | 2 | Steppenwolfer | Robby Albarado | Daniel C. Peitz | 16.30 | 8 1/2 lengths | $200,000 |
| 4 – dead heat | 1 | Brother Derek | Alex Solis | Dan Hendricks | 7.70 | 9 1/2 lengths | $80,000 |
| 4 – dead heat | 18 | Jazil | Fernando Jara | Kiaran McLaughlin | 24.20 | 9 1/2 lengths | $80,000 |
| 6 | 6 | Showing Up | Cornelio Velásquez | Barclay Tagg | 26.20 | 10 lengths | |
| 7 | 11 | Sweetnorthernsaint | Kent Desormeaux | Michael J. Trombetta | 5.50 | 13 lengths | |
| 8 | 14 | Deputy Glitters | Jose Lezcano | Thomas Albertrani | 60.60 | 14 lengths | |
| 9 | 5 | Point Determined | Rafael Bejarano | Bob Baffert | 9.40 | 15 1/4 lengths | |
| 10 | 15 | Seaside Retreat | Patrick Husbands | Mark Casse | 52.50 | 15 1/4 lengths | |
| 11 | 19 | Storm Treasure | David Flores | Steve Asmussen | 51.90 | 19 3/4 lengths | |
| 12 | 17 | Lawyer Ron | John McKee | Robert Holthus | 10.20 | 21 1/2 lengths | |
| 13 | 16 | Cause to Believe | Russell Baze | Jerry Hollendorfer | 25.90 | 21 3/4 lengths | |
| 14 | 20 | Flashy Bull | Mike E. Smith | Kiaran McLaughlin | 43.00 | 24 3/4 lengths | |
| 15 | 12 | Private Vow | Shaun Bridgmohan | Steve Asmussen | 40.50 | 27 1/4 lengths | |
| 16 | 4 | Sinister Minister | Victor Espinoza | Bob Baffert | 9.70 | 30 lengths | |
| 17 | 7 | Bob and John | Garrett K. Gomez | Bob Baffert | 12.90 | 31 1/2 lengths | |
| 18 | 10 | A.P. Warrior | Corey Nakatani | John Shirreffs | 14.10 | 31 3/4 lengths | |
| 19 | 9 | Sharp Humor | Mark Guidry | Dale Romans | 30.10 | 33 1/4 lengths | |
| 20 | 3 | Keyed Entry | Patrick Valenzuela | Todd Pletcher | 28.80 | 40 3/4 lengths | |

Track condition: Fast

Times: 1/4 mile – 22.63; 1/2 mile – 46.07; 3/4 mile – 1:10.88; mile – 1:37.02; final – 2:01.36.
Splits for each quarter-mile: (22.63) (23.44) (24.81) (26.14) (24.34)

Source: Equibase Chart

== Payout ==
The 132nd Kentucky Derby Payout Schedule

| Program Number | Horse Name | Win | Place | Show |
|---|---|---|---|---|
| 8 | Barbaro | US$14.20 | $8.00 | $6.00 |
| 13 | Bluegrass Cat | - | $28.40 | $15.40 |
| 2 | Steppenwolfer | - | - | $7.80 |

- $2 Exacta: (8-13) Paid $587.00
- $2 Trifecta: (8-13-2) Paid $11,418.40
- $2 Superfecta: (8-13-2-1) Paid $84,860.40
- $2 Superfecta: (8-13-2-18) Paid $59,839.00
- 1 Jazil & 18 Brother Derek was a Dead Heat.

== Subsequent racing careers ==
Barbaro fractured a leg in his next start, the Preakness Stakes, and died after a lengthy battle to save him. His ashes are buried at Churchill Downs below a bronze statue of him winning the Derby.

Several other horses from the field went on to record Grade I wins:

- Jazil – Belmont Stakes
- Bluegrass Cat – Haskell Invitational
- Showing Up – Secretariat Stakes, Hollywood Derby
- Lawyer Ron – 2007 Whitney Handicap, Woodward Stakes
- Flashy Bull – 2007 Stephen Foster Handicap

None of the participants in the 2006 Derby went on to become major sires. The most consistent was Bluegrass Cat, who ranked 35th on the 2016 general sire listing for example despite not having a Grade I winner. The best sire from the crop of 2003 proved to be Bernardini, who bypassed the Derby.

== See also ==
- 2006 Preakness Stakes
- 2006 Belmont Stakes
- 2006 Breeders' Cup Classic
