= Super Saver (horse) =

American-bred Thoroughbred racehorse

- Sire: Maria's Mon
- Grandsire: Wavering Monarch
- Dam: Supercharger
- Damsire: A.P. Indy
- Sex: Stallion
- Foaled: 2007
- Country: United States
- Colour: Bay
- Breeder: WinStar Farm
- Owner: Turkish Jockey Club
- Trainer: Todd A. Pletcher
- Record: 9: 3-2-1
- Earnings: US$ 1,826,432

Major wins
- Kentucky Jockey Club Stakes (2009); American Classic Race Wins: Kentucky Derby (2010)

Super Saver (foaled March 18, 2007) is a retired American Thoroughbred racehorse and breeding stallion who won the 2010 Kentucky Derby.

== Pedigree ==
Super Saver's ancestors include damsire A.P. Indy, winner of the 1992 Belmont Stakes, 1957 Preakness Stakes winner Bold Ruler, 1964 Kentucky Derby winner Northern Dancer, and Triple Crown winners Secretariat (1973) and Seattle Slew (1977). He is also descended from superstud Mr. Prospector, whose descendants have won numerous Triple Crown races. His sire Maria's Mon, was also the sire of 2001 Kentucky Derby winner Monarchos, and his dam Supercharger is a full sister to the dam of Bluegrass Cat.

== Racing career ==
Super Saver holds the stakes record for the Kentucky Jockey Club Stakes, by finishing a 1 1/16 on a fast main track in 1:42.83, eclipsing the stakes record of 1:43.14 established by Captain Steve in 1999.

Super Saver provided the third Derby win in a four-year period for jockey Calvin Borel, and the first win out of 25 entries for trainer Todd Pletcher.

Super Saver went off as 5:2 morning line favorite for the 2010 Preakness Stakes but finished eighth.

He then had another poor showing in the Haskell Invitational, and underwent a full veterinary exam, which showed that the colt had bruising and inflammation in all four of his cannon bones.

== Stud career ==
Super Saver was retired from racing in October, 2010 and began his stud career at WinStar Farm in Versailles, Kentucky for the 2011 breeding season. That year, he shuttled to stand stud in Australia for the Southern Hemisphere breeding season. In 2017, he shuttled to Argentina. In 2019, Super Saver was acquired by the Turkish Jockey Club to stand stud in Turkey starting 2020.

Notable progeny include:

c = colt, f = filly

Foaled	Name	Sex	Major Wins
2012	Runhappy	c	Malibu Stakes, Phoenix Stakes, Breeders Cup Sprint
2012	Embellish the Lace	f	Alabama Stakes
2012	Super Majesty	c	Dogwood Stakes
2012	High Dollar Woman	f	Indiana Oaks
2012	I Spent It	c	Saratoga Special Stakes
2012	Competitive Edge	c	Pat Day Mile Stakes, Hopeful Stakes
2013	Inside Straight	c	Oaklawn Handicap
2014	Hedge Fund	c	Essex Handicap
2015	Super Steed	c	Southwest Stakes
2016	Letruska	f	Apple Blossom Handicap(twice); Ogden Phipps Stakes; Personal Ensign Stakes; Spinster Stakes
2018	Super Nao	c	Derby Nacional

== Racing statistics ==
Date	Age	Distance	Race	Gr	Track	Surface	Time	Fin	Margin	Jockey	Trainer	Owner
8/22/09	2	6 ½ f	Maiden Special Weight		SAR	Dirt	1:16.80	2		John Velazquez	Todd A. Pletcher	WinStar Farm
9/11/09	2	1m	Maiden Special Weight		BEL	Dirt	1:38.20	1	7	Ramon Dominguez	Todd A. Pletcher	WinStar Farm
10/10/09	2	1m	Champagne Stakes	I	BEL	Dirt	1:35.12	4		John Velazquez	Todd A. Pletcher	WinStar Farm
11/28/09	2	1 1/16 m	Kentucky Jockey Club Stakes	II	CD	Dirt	1:42.83	1	5	Calvin Borel	Todd A. Pletcher	WinStar Farm
3/13/10	3	1 1/16 m	Tampa Bay Derby	III	TAM	Dirt	1:44.31	3		Ramon Dominguez	Todd A. Pletcher	WinStar Farm
4/10/10	3	1 1/8 m	Arkansas Derby	I	OP	Dirt	1:49.37	2		Calvin Borel	Todd A. Pletcher	WinStar Farm
5/01/10	3	1 1/4 m	Kentucky Derby	I	CD	Dirt	2:04.45	1	2 ½	Calvin Borel	Todd A. Pletcher	WinStar Farm
5/15/10	3	1 3/16 m	Preakness Stakes	I	PIM	Dirt	1:55.47	8		Calvin Borel	Todd A. Pletcher	WinStar Farm
8/1/10	3	1 1/8 m	Haskell Invitational Handicap	I	MON	Dirt	1:49.4	4		Calvin Borel	Todd A. Pletcher	WinStar Farm

== Pedigree ==
Pedigree of Super Saver
Sire Maria's Mon	Wavering Monarch	Majestic Light	Majestic Prince
Sire Maria's Mon	Wavering Monarch	Majestic Light	Irradiate
Sire Maria's Mon	Wavering Monarch	Uncommitted	Buckpasser
Sire Maria's Mon	Wavering Monarch	Uncommitted	Lady Be Good
Sire Maria's Mon	Carlotta Maria	Caro	Fortino
Sire Maria's Mon	Carlotta Maria	Caro	Chambord
Sire Maria's Mon	Carlotta Maria	Water Malone	Naskra
Sire Maria's Mon	Carlotta Maria	Water Malone	Gray Matter
Dam Supercharger	A.P. Indy	Seattle Slew	Bold Reasoning
Dam Supercharger	A.P. Indy	Seattle Slew	My Charmer
Dam Supercharger	A.P. Indy	Weekend Surprise	Secretariat
Dam Supercharger	A.P. Indy	Weekend Surprise	Lassie Dear
Dam Supercharger	Get Lucky	Mr. Prospector	Raise a Native
Dam Supercharger	Get Lucky	Mr. Prospector	Gold Digger
Dam Supercharger	Get Lucky	Dance Number	Northern Dancer
Dam Supercharger	Get Lucky	Dance Number	Numbered Account
