= Rhythm (horse) =

American-bred Thoroughbred racehorse

- Sire: Mr. Prospector
- Grandsire: Raise a Native
- Dam: Dance Number
- Damsire: Northern Dancer
- Sex: Stallion
- Foaled: March 31, 1987
- Country: United States
- Colour: Bay
- Breeder: Ogden Mills Phipps
- Owner: Ogden Mills Phipps
- Trainer: Claude R. McGaughey III
- Record: 20: 6-3-4
- Earnings: $1,592,532

Major wins
- Travers Stakes (1990); Breeders' Cup wins: Breeders' Cup Juvenile (1989)

Awards
- U.S. Champion 2-Yr-Old Colt (1989)
- Last updated on September 8, 2007

Rhythm (March 31, 1987 – 2007) was an American Champion Thoroughbred racehorse.

== Background ==
Rhythm was a bay horse bred in Kentucky by his owner Ogden Mills Phipps. Rhythm was trained by future Hall of Famer, Shug McGaughey.

He was sired by Mr. Prospector out of the Grade I winning mare Dance Number who was a daughter of Northern Dancer.

== Racing career ==
The colt started five times in 1989, finishing his two-year-old campaign with a record of 3–1–1. His one second-place finish was to stablemate Adjudicating in the Grade I Champagne Stakes. In the most important race of the year for his age group, jockey Craig Perret rode Rhythm to a two-length victory in the Breeders' Cup Juvenile in a year when it was held at Florida's Gulfstream Park. The colt's performances earned him 1989 U.S. Champion 2-Yr-Old Colt honors.

In 1990, three-year-old Rhythm made ten starts, winning three times. An increasingly difficult temperament combined with a throat problem that necessitated surgery resulted in the colt's handlers having to skip the U.S. Triple Crown series. By mid summer, Rhythm was getting back in shape and ran second in the Dwyer Stakes and third in both the Woodward Stakes and in the Haskell Invitational Handicap before scoring his most important victory of the year in the prestigious Grade I Travers Stakes.

Rhythm was retired after failing to win in five starts in 1991.

== Stud record ==
Rhythm was sold for US$5.5 million to Japanese breeders. He entered stud in 1992 at Arrow Stud at Hokkaidō from where he would be shuttled to breeders in New Zealand and Australia before returning to the United States in 1997 to stand at Ashford Stud near Versailles, Kentucky. In 2000, Rhythm was sent to Diamond F Ranch in Grass Valley, California where on September 4, 2007, he is reported to have fractured a leg in a paddock accident and had to be euthanized.

As a stallion, Rhythm sired 24 stakes winners. His most successful progeny were in New Zealand and Australia where he was the sire of three Southern Hemisphere champions including the outstanding filly Ethereal whose four Group One wins included three of the most important staying races in Australian racing: the Caulfield Cup, the Melbourne Cup and The BMW Stakes.

== Pedigree ==
Pedigree of Rhythm (USA), bay stallion, 1987
| Sire Mr Prospector (USA) 1970 | Raise a Native (USA); 1961 | Native Dancer | Polynesian |
| Sire Mr Prospector (USA) 1970 | Raise a Native (USA); 1961 | Native Dancer | Geisha |
| Sire Mr Prospector (USA) 1970 | Raise a Native (USA); 1961 | Raise You | Case Ace |
| Sire Mr Prospector (USA) 1970 | Raise a Native (USA); 1961 | Raise You | Lady Glory |
| Sire Mr Prospector (USA) 1970 | Gold Digger(USA); 1962 | Nashua | Nasrullah |
| Sire Mr Prospector (USA) 1970 | Gold Digger(USA); 1962 | Nashua | Segula |
| Sire Mr Prospector (USA) 1970 | Gold Digger(USA); 1962 | Sequence | Count Fleet |
| Sire Mr Prospector (USA) 1970 | Gold Digger(USA); 1962 | Sequence | Miss Dogwood |
| Dam Dance Number (USA) 1979 | Northern Dancer (CAN); 1961 | Nearctic | Nearco |
| Dam Dance Number (USA) 1979 | Northern Dancer (CAN); 1961 | Nearctic | Lady Angela |
| Dam Dance Number (USA) 1979 | Northern Dancer (CAN); 1961 | Natalma | Native Dancer |
| Dam Dance Number (USA) 1979 | Northern Dancer (CAN); 1961 | Natalma | Almahmoud |
| Dam Dance Number (USA) 1979 | Numbered Account (USA); 1969 | Buckpasser | Tom Fool |
| Dam Dance Number (USA) 1979 | Numbered Account (USA); 1969 | Buckpasser | Busanda |
| Dam Dance Number (USA) 1979 | Numbered Account (USA); 1969 | Intriguing | Swaps |
| Dam Dance Number (USA) 1979 | Numbered Account (USA); 1969 | Intriguing | Glamour |

- Rhythm was inbred 3 × 4 to Native Dancer, meaning that this stallion appears in both the third and fourth generations of his pedigree.
