= Roger Laurin =

Canadian racehorse trainer (born 1936)

Personal information
- Born: 1936 (age 89–90) Montreal, Quebec, Canada
- Occupation: Trainer / Owner

Horse racing career
- Sport: Horse racing
- Career wins: 689+ (ongoing)

Major racing wins
- Alabama Stakes (1964); Delaware Oaks (1964); Coaching Club American Oaks (1964); Monmouth Oaks (1964); Molly Pitcher Handicap (1965); Nassau County Handicap (1966); Arlington Handicap (1968); Discovery Handicap (1969); New York Handicap (1969, 1978); Santa Paula Stakes (1969); Canadian International Stakes (1970); Excelsior Handicap (1970); Great American Stakes (1970, 1975); Red Smith Handicap (1970, 1971); Saratoga Special Stakes (1970, 1984); Stymie Handicap (1970); Bowling Green Handicap (1971); Frizette Stakes (1971; Gardenia Stakes (1971); Hialeah Turf Cup Handicap (1971); Matron Stakes (1971); Palm Beach Stakes (1971); Schuylerville Stakes (1971); Selima Stakes (1971); Spinaway Stakes (1971); Prioress Stakes (1972); Spinster Stakes (1972); Test Stakes (1972); Jockey Club Gold Cup (1976); Lawrence Realization Stakes (1976); Brooklyn Handicap (1977); Gazelle Stakes (1977); Long Island Handicap (1977); Hempstead Handicap (1977, 1979); Demoiselle Stakes (1978); Diana Handicap (1979); Fashion Stakes (1979, 1980); Flower Bowl Handicap (1979); Juvenile Stakes (1979); Maskette Handicap (1979); Shuvee Handicap (1979); Nashua Stakes (1981); Gulfstream Park Handicap (1982); Widener Handicap (1982); Hutcheson Stakes (1983); Cowdin Stakes (1984); Gotham Stakes (1984); Hopeful Stakes (1984); Norfolk Stakes (1984); Blue Grass Stakes (1985); Flamingo Stakes (1985); Marlboro Cup Invitational Handicap (1985); Travers Stakes (1985); Mount Vernon Stakes (1989); Victoriana Stakes (1992) Breeders' Cup wins: Breeders' Cup Juvenile (1984)

Significant horses
- Chief's Crown, Drumtop, Great Contractor, Miss Cavandish, Numbered Account, Pearl Necklace

Roger Laurin (born 1936 in Montreal, Quebec) is a trainer of Thoroughbred racehorses in the United States and Canada. He has trained Champions Numbered Account, the 1971 American Champion Two-Year-Old Filly, and Chief's Crown, the 1984 American Champion Two-Year-Old Colt and Breeders' Cup Juvenile winner.

== A family business ==
Roger Laurin grew up in the Thoroughbred racing business as the son of U.S. Racing Hall of Fame trainer Lucien Laurin. He came into prominence in 1964 when he took charge of the race conditioning of a filly named Miss Cavandish. Purchased by Harry S. Nichols for $1,500 because she had a severe "toeing in" problem, under Laurin Miss Cavandish became one of the top two fillies racing in the United States in 1964, finishing second in the balloting for 1964 American Champion 3-Year-Old Filly honors behind future U.S. Racing Hall of Fame inductee Tosmah.

By 1966, Laurin was training for major owners such as Harry Guggenheim's Cain Hoy Stable and Penny Chenery's Meadow Stable. In 1971, he was offered the job as head trainer for Ogden Phipps, a major stable owner and part of the Phipps family, one of America's most prominent racing families. At the time, Laurin had conditioned future Hall of Fame inductee Riva Ridge for racing up to the week before he broke his maiden in his two-year-old debut. It was on his recommendation that Penny Chenery hired his father to replace as the Meadow Stable trainer. In addition to his duties for Ogden Phipps, Laurin had been training horses owned by James Moseley, a member of The Jockey Club and a co-owner and Chairman of the Board of Directors of Suffolk Downs racetrack in Boston, Massachusetts. For Moseley, he most notably conditioned the filly Drumtop, who won numerous top stakes and broke three track records in 1971. For Ogden Phipps, Laurin trained Numbered Account to a 1971 Eclipse Award as the Champion Two-Year-Old Filly.

In the late 1970s, Laurin was training for owners such as Reginald N. Webster, a longtime stable owner for whom Lucien Laurin had won the Belmont Stakes with Amberoid, and for the American racing division of Canadian E. P. Taylor's Windfields Farm. In 1984, he conditioned Chief's Crown to an outstanding season of racing in which he won the Breeders' Cup Juvenile and was voted American Champion Two-Year-Old Colt. After another good year in 1985 with Chief's Crown finishing 3-2-3 in the U.S. Triple Crown series, then winning the Marlboro Cup Invitational Handicap and Travers Stakes, Laurin retired. He did maintain his trainer's license while devoting much of his time to the breeding of Thoroughbreds. In 1992, while racing on a very limited basis, he won the Victoriana Stakes at Woodbine Racetrack in Toronto with a horse he bred and owned. In August 2006, he returned again to race at Saratoga Race Course with two of his own horses.

Still maintaining some involvement with the race conditioning of Thoroughbreds, Laurin had a stable under his care at Fort Erie Racetrack in August 2011.
