= Barbaro, Smarty Jones & Ruffian =

2008 book by Linda Hanna

Barbaro, Smarty Jones and Ruffian: The People's Horses
- Author: Linda Hanna
- Language: English
- Genre: Non-fiction
- Publication date: 2008
- ISBN: 978-09705804-5-0

Barbaro, Smarty Jones and Ruffian: The People's Horses (ISBN 978-09705804-5-0) is a 2008 book written by Linda Hanna about thoroughbred racing.

== Summary ==
Through the lives of Barbaro, Smarty Jones, and Ruffian, Hanna shares aspects of the sport and personal information gathered from her research. Using interviews with owners, trainers, jockeys, equine veterinarians, pedigree specialists, and racing officials, she provides information regarding the subjects.

Speaking from the perspective of a “fan,” Hanna educates her audience in the nuances of breeding, training and racing. She describes the “new Golden Age of Horseracing” of the 1970s, as well as how Ruffian makes her dramatic debut at Belmont Park and smashes track records during their short career. Insights from her trainer, Frank Y. Whiteley, Jr., shed new light on her breakdown during The Great Match Race of 1975.

As Smarty Jones captivated America with his Triple Crown bid in 2004, Hanna weaves readers into the history of horseracing in his home state of Pennsylvania and the positive reverberations there caused by the “Smarty Effect.” All aspects of Smarty Jones' brief career are presented in great detail with new revelations concerning his much-criticized retirement in August 2004. In an introduction to the book written by Smarty's owner, Patricia L. Chapman, readers are reminded of all aspects of the sport-positive and negative. Both Chapman and Hanna speak to the need for greater rescue efforts for needy horses and to the call for greater responsibility for all within the sport. As a designated charity for a portion of the book's proceeds, Hanna directs her readers to The Kentucky Equine Humane Center in a Preface by Staci Hancock who outlines the center's efforts in horse rescue and placement.

The book describes the public response to Barbaro's injury during the 2006 Preakness Stakes, including veterinary treatment at the New Bolton Center and the media attention that followed. It also notes that, after Barbaro's death in January 2007, supporters became involved in initiatives associated with his legacy.

In the last chapter of the book named “Legacy”, Hanna discusses various issues related to horses such as injuries of horses, analysis of pedigrees, opposition against slaughter of horses, rescue operations, work of Fans of Barbaro group, and the influence of the three horses. In the end of the chapter comes an article by Pennsylvania’s governor, Edward G. Rendell, about careers and reception of Barbaro, Smarty Jones, and Ruffian.
