= Miss Cavandish =

American-bred Thoroughbred racehorse

- Sire: Cavan
- Grandsire: Mossborough
- Dam: New Weapon
- Damsire: Bold Venture
- Sex: Filly
- Foaled: 1961
- Country: United States
- Colour: Chestnut
- Breeder: Robert J. Kleberg Jr.
- Owner: Harry S. Nichols
- Trainer: Roger Laurin
- Record: 38: 9-?-?
- Earnings: Not found

Major wins
- Monmouth Oaks (1964); Delaware Oaks (1964); Alabama Stakes (1964); Coaching Club American Oaks (1964); Molly Pitcher Handicap (1965)

Miss Cavandish (foaled 1961) was an American Thoroughbred racehorse. Bred by Robert J. Kleberg Jr. of the renowned King Ranch, she was sired by the 1958 Belmont Stakes winner, Cavan. Her mare was New weapon, a daughter of the 1936 Kentucky Derby and Preakness Stakes winner, Bold Venture.

Considered unlikely to be successful in racing due to a severe "toeing in" problem, she was put up for auction at the September Keeneland Sales. Purchased by Harry S. Nichols for just $1,500, he handed her over to trainer Roger Laurin to see what he could do.

Under Laurin's care, Miss Cavandish raced at age 2, showing her ability when she narrowly lost the Gardenia Stakes. In 1964 the then 3-year-old became one of the top filles racing in the United States with wins in four of the top racers for her age and class.

Miss Cavandish finished second in the balloting for 1964 American Champion 3-Year-Old Filly honors behind future U.S. Racing Hall of Fame inductee, Tosmah.

Miss Cavandish was not successful as a broodmare.
