= Tropical Park Derby =

- Class: Listed
- Location: Gulfstream Park; Hallandale Beach, Florida
- Inaugurated: 1976
- Race type: Thoroughbred – Flat racing
- Website: www.gulfstreampark.com

Race information
- Distance: 1 1/16 miles (8.5 furlongs)
- Surface: Turf
- Track: Left-handed
- Qualification: Three-year-olds
- Purse: $140,000

The Tropical Park Derby is a Listed American Thoroughbred horse race currently run at Gulfstream Park
Hallandale Beach, Florida in mid-December. It is an ungraded stakes race for 3-year-olds with a purse of $140,000 run over the turf at 1 1/16 miles.

Prior to 2014, the race was held at Calder Race Course in Miami Gardens, Florida. The race was once held in early January, often on New Year's Day, which made it the first "derby" of the year. In 2011, Calder ran the race twice: once in January and again in October. In 2012 and 2013, it was run in October only. In 2014, the race was moved to Gulfstream Park and run in December.

Inaugurated in 1976, the Tropical Park Derby was named for the old Tropical Park Race Track in Miami. It was once thought of as the first step on the American Triple Crown trail. In 2006, Barbaro became the first winner of the race to subsequently win the Kentucky Derby.

Due to financial pressure, Calder did not run the race in 2009. The race was downgraded from a Grade III race in 2011 by the American Graded Stakes Committee.

The race has been run under the following combinations of distance and surface:

- 1 1/16 miles on turf – 2014–present
- 1 1/8 miles on turf – 1994–2013 (except in 2002 and 2012 when weather conditions caused the race to be moved to the main track)
- 1 1/16 miles on dirt – 1976–1985
- 1 1/8 miles on dirt – 1986–1993

== Past winners ==
- 2015 – Solemn Tribute
- 2014 – Sky Flight
- 2013 – Amen Kitten
- 2012 – Csaba
- 2011 (October) – Oligarch
- 2011 (January) – King Congie
- 2010 – Fly by Phil (Eduardo Núñez)
- 2008 – Cowboy Cal (John Velazquez)
- 2007 – Soldier's Dancer (Cornelio Velásquez)
- 2006 – Barbaro
- 2005 – Lord Robyn
- 2004 – Kitten's Joy
- 2003 – Nothing to Lose
- 2002‡- Political Attack (Mark Guidry)
- 2001 – Proud Man
- 2000 – Go Lib Go
- 1999 – Valid Reprized
- 1998 – Draw Again
- 1997 – Arthur L.
- 1996 – Ok By Me
- 1995 – Mecke
- 1994 – Fabulous Frolic
- 1993 – Summer Set
- 1992 – Technology
- 1991 – Jackie Wackie
- ‡ In 2002, the race was run off the turf, but retained its GIII status.
