= Elite Power Stakes =

- Class: Grade III
- Location: Aqueduct Racetrack; Queens, New York, United States
- Inaugurated: 2012 (as Diablo Stakes)
- Race type: Thoroughbred – Flat racing
- Website: NYRA

Race information
- Distance: 6 furlongs
- Surface: Dirt
- Track: left-handed
- Qualification: Four-years-old and older
- Weight: 124 lbs. with allowances
- Purse: US$250,000 (since 2025)

The Elite Power Stakes is a Grade III American Thoroughbred horse race for four years old or older at a distance of six furlongs on the dirt run annually in November at Aqueduct Racetrack in Queens, New York. The event currently offers a purse of $250,000.

== History ==
The event was inaugurated on 10 May 2014 as the Diablo Stakes and was won by Royal Currier who started at 7/1. The following year the event was not held. The event was resumed on 14 May 2014 and was won by the favorite Sensational Slam who defeated four other runners including Royal Currier over 6 furlongs in a time of 1:09.07. The event was marred by the disqualification of the second place finisher Green Grotto who was placed third and Royal Currier installed in second for interference 1/8 mile from the finishing post. The event was named after the versatile sprinter Diablo who won the 1991 Grade II True North Handicap and the 1992 Grade III Finger Lakes Budweiser Breeders' Cup.

In 2018 the event was renamed to the Runhappy Stakes in honor of the 2015 US Champion Sprint Horse Runhappy.

The event was upgraded to Grade III in 2020 but was not held due to the COVID-19 pandemic in the United States. Belmont Park ran a shortened meeting and the event was cancelled in favor of the rescheduled Carter Handicap being moved from Aqueduct Racetrack.

In 2024 the event was moved to Aqueduct Racetrack due to infield tunnel and redevelopment work at Belmont Park.

In 2025 NYRA moved the event from May to November and renamed the event to the Elite Power Stakes after the two-time Breeders' Cup Sprint winner Elite Power.

== Records ==
Speed record:

- 6 furlongs – 1:08.12 Firenze Fire (2019)

Margins:

- 4 3/4 lengths – Firenze Fire (2019)

Most wins:

- 2 – Stallwalkin' Dude (2015, 2017)
- 2 – Firenze Fire (2019, 2021)

Most wins by a jockey:

- 2 – Irad Ortiz Jr. (2019, 2021)
- 2 – Manuel Franco (2016, 2025)

Most wins by a trainer:

- 2 – David Jacobson (2015, 2017)

Most wins by an owner:

- 2 – David Jacobson (2015, 2017)
- 2 – Mr. Amore Stable (2019, 2021)

== Winners ==
Year	Winner	Age	Jockey	Trainer	Owner	Time	Purse	Grade	Ref
At Aqueduct – Elite Power Stakes
2025	Just Beat the Odds	5	Manuel Franco	Gregory Sacco	Donna Wright	1:09.99	$242,500	III	
Runhappy Stakes
2024	Joey Freshwater	4	Jose Lezcano	Linda L. Rice	Winning Move Stable	1:09.41	$169,750	III	
At Belmont Park
2023	Candy Man Rocket	5	Junior Alvarado	William I. Mott	Frank Fletcher Racing Operations, Inc.	1:09.33	$175,000	III	
2022	Drafted	8	José Ortiz	David P. Duggan	Dublin Fjord Stables, Racepoint Stables, Kevin D. Hilbert, & Thom O'Keefe	1:10.84	$139,500	III	
2021	Firenze Fire	6	Irad Ortiz Jr.	Kelly Breen	Mr. Amore Stable	1:09.76	$145,500	III	
2020	Race not held								
2019	Firenze Fire	4	Irad Ortiz Jr.	Jason Servis	Mr. Amore Stable	1:08.12	$150,000	Listed	
2018	Westwood	4	John R. Velazquez	Kiaran P. McLaughlin	Godolphin	1:09.45	$147,000	Listed	
Diablo Stakes
2017	Stallwalkin' Dude	7	Joe Bravo	David Jacobson	David Jacobson & Head of Plains Partners	1:10.16	$100,000	Listed	
2016	Joking	7	Manuel Franco	Charlton Baker	Charlton Baker	1:09.44	$100,000	Listed	
2015	Stallwalkin' Dude	5	Angel Cruz	David Jacobson	David Jacobson	1:09.48	$98,000		
2014	Sensational Slam	6	Cornelio Velasquez	Patrick Quick	Paradise Farms	1:09.07	$98,000		
2013	Race not held								
2012	Royal Currier	4	Rajiv Maragh	Patricia Farro	MAT Stables	1:08.42	$83,300	Listed	

== See also ==
List of American and Canadian Graded races
