= Steppenwolfer =

American-bred Thoroughbred racehorse

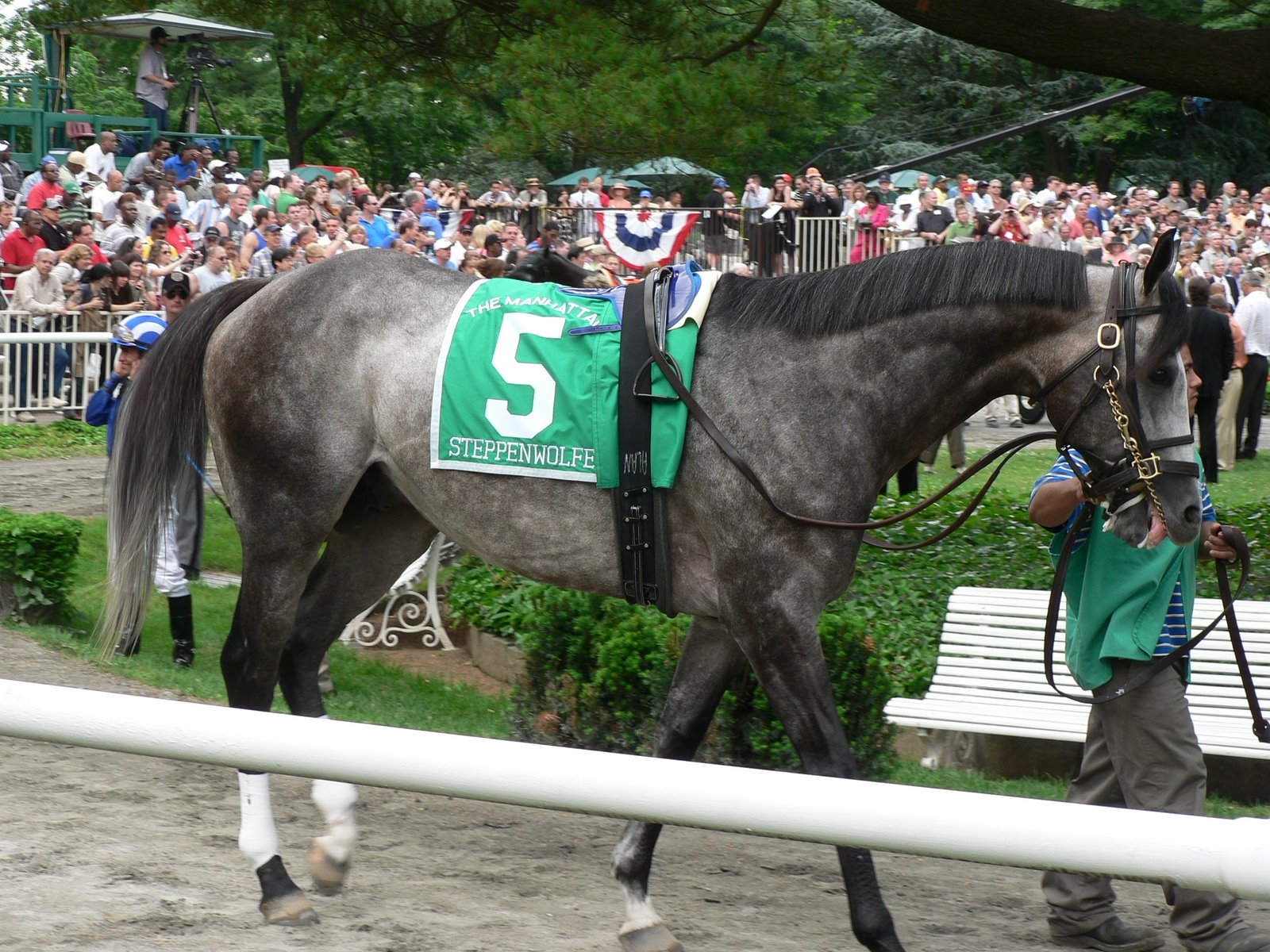
- 2007 Manhattan Handicap
- Sire: Aptitude
- Grandsire: A. P. Indy
- Dam: Wolfer
- Damsire: Wolf Power
- Sex: Gelding
- Foaled: 2003
- Country: United States
- Colour: Gray
- Breeder: Nursery Place & Partners
- Owner: 1) Lawana and Robert Low; 2) Polaris Stable
- Trainer: 1) Daniel Pietz (flat); 2) Sanna Hendriks (steeple-chasing)
- Record: 23: 3-3-5
- Earnings: $653,459

Steppenwolfer (March 16, 2003 - June 21, 2018) was an American Thoroughbred racehorse. He was sired by Aptitude, who in turn was the son of the 1992 U.S. Horse of the Year and U.S. Racing Hall of Fame inductee, A.P. Indy, out of the mare, Wolfer.

He was a contender for the Triple Crown in 2006, but fell short by finishing third to Barbaro in the Kentucky Derby.

Steppenwolfer was gelded in 2009 and was retrained for steeplechasing. He did not win any of his starts in 2009 or 2010. Steppenwolfer was sold to Gail Thayer of Unionville, Pennsylvania and was re-trained as a foxhunter. The stipulations of his sale to Thayer state that he may never be re-sold.

== Connections ==
Steppenwolfer was owned by Robert and Lawana Low. He was trained by Daniel Pietz and is ridden by Robby Albarado. He was bred in Kentucky by Nursery Place & Partners. He was first owned by two very successful horseman John Mayer the owner of Nursery Place Farm and his wife's brother Happy Broadbent. He was walked as a yearling by the two sons of John Mayer, Griffin the older of the two and Walker the younger, and then sold as a two-year-old for $25,000.

== Races ==
Finish	Race	Distance	Track	Condition
3rd	Kentucky Derby	One and a quarter miles (Dirt)	Churchill Downs	Fast
2nd	Arkansas Derby			
3rd	Rebel Stakes	One and One-Sixteenth Miles	Oaklawn Park	Fast
2nd	Southwest Stakes	One Mile	Oaklawn Park	Fast
1st	Allowance	One Mile	Oaklawn Park	Good
1st	Allowance Optional Claiming	One and One-Sixteenths Mile	Fair Grounds Race Course at Louisiana Downs	Fast
3rd	Allowance Optional Claiming	One and One-Sixteenths Miles	Fair Grounds Race Course at Louisiana Downs	Fast
1st	Maiden	Seven Furlongs	Aqueduct Racetrack	Fast
5th	Maiden	Six Furlongs (Turf)	Belmont Park	Good
