= Dance Number =

American-bred Thoroughbred racehorse

- Sire: Northern Dancer
- Grandsire: Nearctic
- Dam: Numbered Account
- Damsire: Buckpasser
- Sex: Mare
- Foaled: 1979
- Country: United States
- Colour: Bay
- Breeder: Ogden Phipps
- Owner: Ogden Phipps
- Trainer: Angel Penna, Sr.
- Record: 21: 8-3-4
- Earnings: US$415,418

Major wins
- Dark Mirage Stakes (1982); High Voltage Stakes (1982); Beldame Stakes (1983); Shuvee Handicap (1983)

Dance Number (foaled March 28, 1979 in Kentucky) was an American Thoroughbred mare who retired having equaled or broken three track records for breeder and owner Ogden Phipps.

== Racing career ==
Trained by U.S. Racing Hall of Fame inductee Angel Penna, Sr., on October 29, 1982, the three-year-old Dance Number equaled the Aqueduct Racetrack track record for 6½ furlongs on dirt in the High Voltage Stakes. As a three-year-old, on May 21, 1983, Dance Number won the Grade 2 Shuvee Handicap with another track record equaling run, this time at a mile and 1/16 on dirt. Then, on August 16, she set a new Beldame Stakes record for the Grade 1 event with a time of 2:00 3/5 for a mile and a quarter on dirt.

== Broodmare career ==
Retired to broodmare duty, Dance Number produced six runners the most important of which was Rhythm who won the 1989 Breeders' Cup Juvenile and who was voted the Eclipse Award as the American Champion Two-Year-Old Colt.

== Pedigree ==
Pedigree of Dance Number
Sire Northern Dancer	Nearctic	Nearco	Pharos
Sire Northern Dancer	Nearctic	Nearco	Nogara
Sire Northern Dancer	Nearctic	Lady Angela	Hyperion
Sire Northern Dancer	Nearctic	Lady Angela	Sister Sarah
Sire Northern Dancer	Natalma	Native Dancer	Polynesian
Sire Northern Dancer	Natalma	Native Dancer	Geisha
Sire Northern Dancer	Natalma	Almahmoud	Mahmoud
Sire Northern Dancer	Natalma	Almahmoud	Arbitrator
Dam Numbered Account	Buckpasser	Tom Fool	Menow
Dam Numbered Account	Buckpasser	Tom Fool	Gaga
Dam Numbered Account	Buckpasser	Busanda	War Admiral
Dam Numbered Account	Buckpasser	Busanda	Businesslike
Dam Numbered Account	Intriguing	Swaps	Khaled
Dam Numbered Account	Intriguing	Swaps	Iron Reward
Dam Numbered Account	Intriguing	Glamour	Nasrullah
Dam Numbered Account	Intriguing	Glamour	Striking
