= Alabama Stakes =

- Class: Grade I stakes
- Location: Saratoga Race Course; Saratoga Springs, New York, United States
- Inaugurated: 1872
- Race type: Thoroughbred – Flat racing

Race information
- Distance: 11/4 miles (10 furlongs)
- Surface: Dirt
- Track: left-handed
- Qualification: Three-year-old fillies
- Weight: 121 lbs. (54.9 kg)
- Purse: $600,000

The Alabama Stakes is an American Thoroughbred horse race open to three-year-old fillies. Inaugurated in 1872, the Grade I race is run over a distance of one and one-quarter miles on the dirt track at Saratoga Race Course. Held in mid August, it currently offers a purse of $600,000. In 2010 it became the third leg of the American Triple Tiara of Thoroughbred Racing, after the Acorn Stakes and Coaching Club American Oaks.

The Alabama Stakes is named in honor of William Cottrell of Mobile, Alabama. "Alabama" was the name settled on because Cottrell was too modest to have a race named for him personally. The inaugural running took place on July 19, 1872 and was won by a chestnut filly named Woodbine owned by prominent New York financier August Belmont Sr.

The race was not run from 1893 to 1896 and 1898 to 1900. The 1908 passage of the Hart–Agnew anti-betting legislation by the New York Legislature under Republican Governor Charles Evans Hughes led to a state-wide shutdown of racing in 1911 and 1912. During World War II, from 1943 through 1945 the Alabama Stakes was run at Belmont Park.

The race has been contested at various distances:

- 1 mile and 1 furlong – 1872–1901, 1904, 1906–1916
- 1 1/16 miles – 1901, 1902, and on the turf in 1903
- 1 5/16 miles – 1905
- 1 1/4 miles – 1917 to present

== Records ==
Speed record at current distance:

- 2:00.80 @ 1¼ miles : Go For Wand (1990)

Most wins by an owner:

- 5 – Belair Stud (1924, 1942, 1944, 1946, 1953)

Most wins by a jockey:

- 5 – Jorge Velásquez (1972, 1973, 1977, 1984, 1987)
- 5 – Jerry D. Bailey (1997, 1998, 1999, 2001, 2005)
- 5 – Mike E. Smith (1993, 1994, 1995, 2000, 2016)

Most wins by a trainer:

- 8 – Sunny Jim Fitzsimmons (1924, 1928, 1942, 1944, 1946, 1950, 1953, 1959)

== Winners ==
Year	Winner	Jockey	Trainer	Owner	Dist. (Miles)	Time	Win$	Gr.
2026	My Gun's Loaded	Manuel Franco	Chad C. Brown	Douglas Scharbauer	11/4	2:04.87	$330,000	G1
2025	Nitrogen	José Ortiz	Mark E. Casse	D.J. Stable	11/4	2:03.31	$330,000	G1
2024	Power Squeeze	Javier Castellano	Jorge Delgado	Andrew Schwarz & Wendy Schwarz Gilder	11/4	2:04.35	$330,000	G1
2023	Randomized	Joel Rosario	Chad C. Brown	Klaravich Stables	11/4	2:03.07	$330,000	G1
2022	Nest	Irad Ortiz Jr.	Todd A. Pletcher	Repole Stable, Eclipse Thoroughbreds, & Michael House	11/4	2:03.14	$330,000	G1
2021	Malathaat	John R. Velazquez	Todd A. Pletcher	Shadwell Stable	11/4	2:02.59	$330,000	G1
2020	Swiss Skydiver	Tyler Gaffalione	Kenneth McPeek	Peter J. Callahan	11/4	2:03.04	$275,000	G1
2019	Dunbar Road	José Ortiz	Chad C. Brown	Peter M. Brant	11/4	2:04.07	$360,000	G1
2018	Eskimo Kisses	José Ortiz	Kenneth McPeek	Gainesway Farm, Magdalena Racing, & Nehoc Stables	11/4	2:03.22	$360,000	G1
2017	Elate	José Ortiz	William I. Mott	Claiborne Farm & Adele B. Dilschneider	11/4	2:02.19	$360,000	G1
2016	Songbird	Mike E. Smith	Jerry Hollendorfer	Fox Hill Farms, Inc.	11/4	2:03.00	$360,000	G1
2015	Embellish the Lace	Javier Castellano	Anthony W. Dutrow	JoAnn & Alex Lieblong	11/4	2:01.97	$360,000	G1
2014	Stopchargingmaria	John R. Velazquez	Todd A. Pletcher	Repole Stable	11/4	2:05.14	$360,000	G1
2013	Princess of Sylmar	Javier Castellano	Todd A. Pletcher	King of Prussia Stable	11/4	2:03.21	$360,000	G1
2012	Questing	Irad Ortiz Jr.	Kiaran McLaughlin	Godolphin Racing LLC	11/4	2:01.29	$360,000	G1
2011	Royal Delta	Jose Lezcano	William I. Mott	Palides Investments	11/4	2:03.13	$300,000	G1
2010	Blind Luck	Joel Rosario	Jerry Hollendorfer	Mark Dedomenico, John Carver, Peter Abruzzo, Jerry Hollendorfer	11/4	2:03.89	$300,000	G1
2009	Careless Jewel	Robert Landry	Josie Carroll	Donver Stable (Vern & Donna Dubinsky)	11/4	2:03.24	$360,000	G1
2008	Proud Spell	Gabriel Saez	Larry Jones	Brereton C. Jones	11/4	2:04.08	$360,000	G1
2007	Lady Joanne	Calvin Borel	Carl Nafzger	Bentley L. Smith	11/4	2:03.62	$360,000	G1
2006	Pine Island	Javier Castellano	C. R. McGaughey III	Phipps Stable	11/4	2:02.87	$360,000	G1
2005	Sweet Symphony	Jerry D. Bailey	William I. Mott	Kinsman Stable	11/4	2:04.45	$450,000	G1
2004	Society Selection	Cornelio Velásquez	H. Allen Jerkens	Marjorie & Irving Cowan	11/4	2:02.60	$450,000	G1
2003	Island Fashion	John R. Velazquez	Barclay Tagg	Jeffrey L. Nielsen	11/4	2:05.00	$450,000	G1
2002	Farda Amiga	Pat Day	Paulo Lobo	Marcos Simon, Julio Camargo, Santa Escolastica Stable (Jose DeCamargo)	11/4	2:04.60	$450,000	G1
2001	Flute	Jerry D. Bailey	Robert J. Frankel	Juddmonte Farms	11/4	2:01.80	$450,000	G1
2000	Jostle	Mike E. Smith	John C. Servis	Fox Hill Farms, Inc. (Rick Porter)	11/4	2:04.60	$450,000	G1
1999	Silverbulletday	Jerry D. Bailey	Bob Baffert	Michael E. Pegram	11/4	2:02.60	$240,000	G1
1998	Banshee Breeze	Jerry D. Bailey	Carl Nafzger	James B. Tafel	11/4	2:03.40	$150,000	G1
1997	Runup The Colors	Jerry D. Bailey	Neil J. Howard	William S. Farish III	11/4	2:02.20	$150,000	G1
1996	Yanks Music	John R. Velazquez	Leo O'Brien	Michael Fennessy & Audrey H. Cooper	11/4	2:03.00	$150,000	G1
1995	Pretty Discreet	Mike E. Smith	William Terrill	E. Paul Robsham	11/4	2:02.00	$120,000	G1
1994	Heavenly Prize	Mike E. Smith	C. R. McGaughey III	Ogden Phipps	11/4	2:03.20	$120,000	G1
1993	Sky Beauty	Mike E. Smith	H. Allen Jerkens	Georgia E. Hofmann	11/4	2:03.40	$120,000	G1
1992	November Snow	Chris Antley	H. Allen Jerkens	Earle I. Mack	11/4	2:02.75	$120,000	G1
1991	Versailles Treaty	Ángel Cordero Jr.	C. R. McGaughey III	Cynthia Phipps	11/4	2:02.40	$120,000	G1
1990	Go For Wand	Randy Romero	William Badget Jr.	Christiana Stables	11/4	2:00.80	$130,560	G1
1989	Open Mind	Ángel Cordero Jr.	D. Wayne Lukas	Eugene V. Klein	11/4	2:04.20	$139,440	G1
1988	Maplejinsky	Ángel Cordero Jr.	Philip G. Johnson	Susan Kaskel	11/4	2:01.80	$136,320	G1
1987	Up The Apalachee	Jorge Velásquez	George Arcenaux	J. Minos Simon	11/4	2:04.00	$138,240	G1
1986	Classy Cathy	Earlie Fires	C. R. McGaughey III	Edward A. Cox Jr.	11/4	2:04.20	$138,720	G1
1985	Mom's Command	Abigail Fuller	Edward T. Allard	Peter D. Fuller	11/4	2:03.20	$84,000	G1
1984	Life's Magic	Jorge Velásquez	D. Wayne Lukas	Eugene V. Klein	11/4	2:02.60	$84,600	G1
1983	Spit Curl	Jean Cruguet	LeRoy Jolley	Peter M. Brant	11/4	2:02.40	$65,880	G1
1982	Broom Dance	Gregg McCarron	James W. Maloney	Christiana Stables	11/4	2:02.20	$67,680	G1
1981	Prismatical	Eddie Maple	Luis Barrera	Happy Valley Farm (Stephen & Gary Wolfson)	11/4	2:02.40	$66,000	G1
1980	Love Sign	Ruben Hernandez	Sidney Watters Jr.	Stephen C. Clark Jr.	11/4	2:01.00	$65,880	G1
1979	It's In The Air	Jeffrey Fell	Lazaro S. Barrera	Harbor View Farm	11/4	2:01.40	$64,980	G1
1978	White Star Line	Michael Venezia	Woody Stephens	Newstead Farm	11/4	2:04.00	$64,920	G1
1977	Our Mims	Jorge Velásquez	John M. Veitch	Calumet Farm	11/4	2:03.00	$66,060	G1
1976	Optimistic Gal	Eddie Maple	LeRoy Jolley	Diana M. Firestone	11/4	2:01.60	$48,555	G1
1975	Spout	Jean Cruguet	Victor J. Nickerson	Maxwell Gluck	11/4	2:04.00	$49,170	G1
1974	Quaze Quilt	Heliodoro Gustines	Charles R. Parke	Fred W. Hooper	11/4	2:02.60	$33,660	G1
1973	Desert Vixen	Jorge Velásquez	Thomas F. Root Sr.	Harry T. Mangurian Jr.	11/4	2:04.20	$34,620	G1
1972	Summer Guest	Jorge Velásquez	J. Elliott Burch	Rokeby Stable	11/4	2:03.40	$32,640	
1971	Lauries Dancer	Sandy Hawley	James C. Bentley	Helen G. Stollery	11/4	2:03.00	$35,280	
1970	Fanfreluche	Ron Turcotte	Yonnie Starr	Jean-Louis Levesque	11/4	2:03.80	$38,415	
1969	Shuvee	Jesse Davidson	Willard C. Freeman	Anne Minor Stone	11/4	2:06.40	$35,360	
1968	Gay Matelda	John L. Rotz	Casey Hayes	Meadow Stable	11/4	2:04.40	$36,920	
1967	Gamely	Bill Shoemaker	James W. Maloney	William Haggin Perry	11/4	2:03.20	$39,130	
1966	Natashka	Bill Shoemaker	William A. Peterson	George F. Getty II	11/4	2:04.20	$36,790	
1965	What A Treat	John L. Rotz	Sylvester E. Veitch	George D. Widener Jr.	11/4	2:03.60	$41,080	
1964	Miss Cavandish	Howard Grant	Roger Laurin	Harry S. Nichols	11/4	2:03.20	$36,530	
1963	Tona	Mike Sorrentino	Norman R. McLeod	Thomas S. Nichols	11/4	2:04.20	$37,310	
1962	Firm Policy	Johnny Sellers	E. Barry Ryan	E. Barry Ryan	11/4	2:06.00	$37,050	
1961	Primonetta	Bill Shoemaker	James P. Conway	Darby Dan Farm	11/4	2:03.20	$35,555	
1960	Make Sail	Manuel Ycaza	Woody Stephens	Cain Hoy Stable	11/4	2:04.00	$38,205	
1959	High Bid	Henry E. Moreno	James E. Fitzsimmons	Wheatley Stable	11/4	2:05.00	$37,230	
1958	Tempted	Robert Ussery	Henry S. Clark	Mooring Stable	11/4	2:05.80	$18,712	
1957	Here and There	Eldon Nelson	Max Hirsch	King Ranch	11/4	2:06.40	$20,450	
1956	Tournure	Eric Guerin	Otis J. Clelland	Laura S. Branham	11/4	2:05.40	$18,600	
1955	Rico Reto	William Boland	Max Hirsch	W. Arnold Hanger	11/4	2:05.80	$20,750	
1954	Parlo	Eddie Arcaro	Richard E. Handlen	Foxcatcher Farm	11/4	2:06.00	$20,550	
1953	Sabette	Jesse Higley	James E. Fitzsimmons	Belair Stud	11/4	2:06.00	$18,800	
1952	Lily White	Ted Atkinson	Oscar White	Walter M. Jeffords Sr.	11/4	2:05.80	$17000	
1951	Kiss Me Kate	Eddie Arcaro	Oscar White	Walter M. Jeffords Sr.	11/4	2:05.60	$15,250	
1950	Busanda	Robert Permane	James E. Fitzsimmons	Ogden Phipps	11/4	2:04.40	$15,850	
1949	Adile	Eddie Arcaro	Oscar White	Walter M. Jeffords Sr.	11/4	2:04.00	$17,000	
1948	Compliance	Ted Atkinson	George H. Strate	Lester Manor Stable	11/4	2:06.00	$16,900	
1947	But Why Not	Eric Guerin	Max Hirsch	King Ranch	11/4	2:05.00	$10,100	
1946	Hypnotic	Eric Guerin	James E. Fitzsimmons	Belair Stud	11/4	2:04.20	$18,250	
1945	Sicily	Ted Atkinson	William Post	Harry La Montagne	11/4	2:03.40	$21,015	
1944	Vienna	James Stout	James E. Fitzsimmons	Belair Stud	11/4	2:03.60	$18,170	
1943	Stefanita	Conn McCreary	Winbert F. Mulholland	George D. Widener Jr.	11/4	2:04.40	$11,425	
1942	Vagrancy	James Stout	James E. Fitzsimmons	Belair Stud	11/4	2:05.20	$8,950	
1941	War Wizard	Conn McCreary	Walter A. Carter	Glen Riddle Farm	11/4	2:04.80	$8,975	
1940	Salaminia	Don Meade	Duval A. Headley	Hal Price Headley	11/4	2:04.80	$9,450	
1939	War Plumage	Maurice Peters	Howard J. Wells	James Cox Brady Jr.	11/4	2:05.00	$10,100	
1938	Handcuff	Jack Westrope	Hugh L. Fontaine	Brookmeade Stable	11/4	2:07.40	$8,275	
1937	Regal Lily	Harry Richards	Preston M. Burch	Walter M. Jeffords Sr.	11/4	2:08.20	$7,475	
1936	Floradora	Danny Brammer	Albert B. Gordon	E. Dale Shaffer	11/4	2:06.60	$7,525	
1935	Alberta	Silvio Coucci	Henry McDaniel	Willis Sharpe Kilmer	11/4	2:05.20	$7,350	
1934	Hindu Queen	Lee Humphries	Max Hirsch	Morton L. Schwartz	11/4	2:05.00	$11,050	
1933	Barn Swallow	Don Meade	Herbert J. Thompson	Edward R. Bradley	11/4	2:06.60	$11,525	
1932	Top Flight	Raymond Workman	Thomas J. Healey	Cornelius Vanderbilt Whitney	11/4	2:06.40	$12,225	
1931	Risque	Earl Steffen	Willie Knapp	Fannie Hertz	11/4	2:05.60	$14,200	
1930	Escutcheon	Linus McAtee	George M. Odom	Marshall Field III	11/4	2:04.20	$13,875	
1929	Aquastella	Pete Walls	Thomas J. Healey	Florence L. Clark	11/4	2:04.80	$11,775	
1928	Nixie	Danny McAuliffe	James E. Fitzsimmons	Wheatley Stable	11/4	2:10.20	$11,550	
1927	Nimba	Harold Thurber	George M. Odom	Marshall Field III	11/4	2:06.80	$12,925	
1926	Rapture	Linus McAtee	James G. Rowe Sr.	Harry P. Whitney	11/4	2:06.00	$9,275	
1925	Maid at Arms	Albert Johnson	Gwyn R. Tompkins	Glen Riddle Farm	11/4	2:07.00	$10,625	
1924	Priscilla Ruley	John Maiben	James E. Fitzsimmons	Belair Stud	11/4	2:08.80	$9,925	
1923	Untidy	Earl Sande	Scott P. Harlan	Greentree Stable	11/4	2:05.40	$8,950	
1922	Nedna	Frank Keogh	James G. Rowe Sr.	William P. Thompson	11/4	2:08.00	$8,050	
1921	Prudery	Laverne Fator	James G. Rowe Sr.	Harry P. Whitney	11/4	2:04.20	$7,275	
1920	Cleopatra	Linus McAtee	William H. Karrick	William R. Coe	11/4	2:07.80	$7,275	
1919	Vexatious	Eddie Ambrose	James G. Rowe Sr.	Harry P. Whitney	11/4	2:09.20	$7,265	
1918	Eyelid	Lavelle Ensor	Richard O. Miller	Anthony L. Aste	11/4	2:04.20	$6,575	
1917	Sunbonnet	Johnny Loftus	Walter B. Jennings	A. Kingsley Macomber	11/4	2:07.00	$3,850	
1916	Malachite	Lawrence Lyke	Sam Hildreth	August Belmont Jr.	11/8	1:54.60	$1,720	
1915	Waterblossom	Edward C. Martin	Thomas Clay McDowell	Thomas Clay McDowell	11/8	1:57.60	$1,160	
1914	Addie M.	Charles Burlingame	George W. Langdon	John W. Messervy	11/8	1:54.40	$1,740	
1913	Flying Fairy	Tommy Davies	J. Simon Healy	Edward B. Cassatt	11/8	1:56.20	$1,455	
1912	No races held due to the Hart–Agnew Law.							
1911	No races held due to the Hart–Agnew Law.							
1910	Ocean Bound	Cal Shilling	French Brooks	Woodford Clay	11/8	1:55.00	$3,850	
1909	Maskette	Richard Scoville	James G. Rowe Sr.	James R. Keene	11/8	1:59.40	$3,850	
1908	Mayfield	Cal Shilling	William Hayward Jr.	John Sanford	11/8	2:01.00	$3,850	
1907	Kennyetto	Joe Notter	William Hayward Jr.	John Sanford	11/8	1:54.20	$3,850	
1906	Running Water	Walter Miller	Thomas Welsh	Newcastle Stable	11/8	1:52.40	$3,850	
1905	Tradition	Willie Davis	A. Jack Joyner	Sydney Paget	15/16	2:16.60	$4,850	
1904	Beldame	Frank O'Neill	Fred Burlew	Newton Bennington	11/8	1:53.60	$3,850	
1903	Stamping Ground	Grover Fuller	George Cornell	F. R. Doctor	11/16	1:56.80	$4,625	
1902	Par Excellence	Arthur Redfern	Crit Davis	The Pepper Stable	11/16	1:47.60	$3,850	
1901	Morningside	Nash Turner	John W. Rogers	William Collins Whitney	11/16	1:47.80	$1,900	
1898	– 1900	Race not held						
1897	Poetess	Charles A. Thorpe		William Laimbeer	11/8	2:01.25	$1,425	
1893	– 1896	Race not held						
1892	Ignite	Alonzo Clayton	John H. Morris	Bashford Manor Stable	11/8	1:57.50	$2,475	
1891	Sallie McClelland	George Anderson	Byron McClelland	Byron McClelland	11/8	2:05.75	$2,070	
1890	Sinaloa II	Shelby Barnes	Robert E. Campbell	Santa Anita Stable	11/8	1:56.50	$3,750	
1889	Princess Bowling	Isaac Murphy		B. F. Pettit	11/8	2:03.50	$2,650	
1888	Bella B.	Jim McLaughlin	Frank McCabe	Dwyer Brothers Stable	11/8	1:58.00	$3,675	
1887	Grisette	E. West	Albert Cooper	Santa Anita Stable	11/8	2:00.50	$3,000	
1886	Millie	Jim McLaughlin	Frank McCabe	Dwyer Brothers Stable	11/8	1:59.50	$3,550	
1885	Ida Hope	Isaac Murphy	John W. Rogers	Edward C. Corrigan	11/8	1:59.00	$3,225	
1884	Tolu	Harry Blaylock	R. Wyndham Walden	George L. Lorillard	11/8	2:01.00	$3,500	
1883	Miss Woodford	Jim McLaughlin	James G. Rowe Sr.	Dwyer Brothers Stable	11/8	1:57.50	$3,050	
1882	Belle of Runnymede	John Stoval	James G. Rowe Sr.	George W. Bowen & Co.	11/8	2:08.75	$3,250	
1881	Thora	William Donohue	James Lee	Charles Reed	11/8	1:59.25	$1,450	
1880	Glidelia	William Donohue	George Rice	William M. Connor	11/8	2:00.00	$2,600	
1879	Ferida	Lloyd Hughes	R. Wyndham Walden	George L. Lorillard	11/8	2:00.75	$3,300	
1878	Belle	William Hayward Jr.	George Rice	Oden Bowie	11/8	1:59.00	$2,800	
1877	Susquehanna	Lloyd Hughes	Jacob Pincus	August Belmont Sr.	11/8	1:57.25	$3,450	
1876	Merciless	Dan Sparling	William Brown	Pierre Lorillard IV	11/8	2:00.75	$2,850	
1875	Olitipa	S. Evans	Jacob Pincus	August Belmont Sr.	11/8	2:00.50	$2,800	
1874	Regardless	John Sparling	William Brown	Francis Morris	11/8	2:00.25	$3,100	
1873	Minnie	R. Ponton	R. Wyndham Walden	R. Wyndham Walden	11/8	2:01.60	$3,050	
1872	Woodbine	C. Gradwell	Jacob Pincus	August Belmont Sr.	11/8	2:06.20	$2,650	

+ In 1968 Heartland finished first but was disqualified and placed second.
+ In 1966 Lady Pitt finished first but was disqualified and placed second.
+ In 1942 Bonnet Ann finished first but was disqualified and placed last.
+ In 1908 Stamina finished first but was disqualified and placed last.
