= Busanda =

American Thoroughbred racehorse

- Sire: War Admiral
- Grandsire: Man o' War
- Dam: Businesslike
- Damsire: Blue Larkspur
- Sex: Mare
- Foaled: 1947
- Country: United States
- Colour: Black
- Breeder: Ogden Phipps
- Owner: Ogden Phipps
- Trainer: James E. Fitzsimmons & Bartholomew Sweeney (Assistant)
- Record: 65: 10-5-13
- Earnings: $182,460

Major wins
- Alabama Stakes (1950); New Castle Handicap (1951); Suburban Handicap (1951); Top Flight Handicap (1951); Saratoga Cup (1951, 1952); Diana Handicap (1952)

Honors
- Busanda Stakes at Aqueduct Racetrack

Busanda (1947–1968) was an American Thoroughbred racehorse best remembered as the dam of U.S. Racing Hall of Fame inductee Buckpasser.

== Background ==
Busanda was sired by 1937 U.S. Triple Crown champion War Admiral, a son of Man o' War, who was ranked first in the Blood-Horse magazine list of the top 100 U.S. Thoroughbred champions of the 20th Century. Busanda's dam, Businesslike, was sired by U.S. Racing Hall of Fame inductee Blue Larkspur and out of the extremely important French broodmare La Troienne.

Businesslike was owned by Colonel E. R. Bradley at the time of Busanda's conception. When Bradley died in August 1946, Businesslike was sold to Ogden Phipps, who became Busanda's breeder of record.

Busanda's name is an acronym for the Bureau of Supplies and Accounts, which was a Navy bureau that Phipps had served in during World War II.

Busanda was conditioned by Hall of Fame trainer "Sunny Jim" Fitzsimmons, who handled a large string of horse for the Phipps family. In some of her races, though, Fitzsimmons' assistant Bartholomew Sweeney is recorded as the trainer.

== Racing career ==
In an era when most Thoroughbreds were raced frequently and for two to three years, Busanda made sixty-five starts during four seasons of competition. At age two, her best showing was a third-place finish to winner Bed o'Roses in the Selima Stakes at Laurel Park Racecourse. Although as a three-year-old in 1950 she won the important Alabama Stakes, she had her best campaign at age four in 1951. That year, her performances included wins against male horses when she captured the New Castle and Suburban handicaps as well as the Saratoga Cup. In 1952, in addition to her second straight Saratoga Cup, she won the Diana Handicap before being retired to broodmare duty.

== Retirement ==
Bred to U.S. Racing Hall of Fame inductee Tom Fool, in 1963 Busanda produced the colt Buckpasser, who was the 1966 American Horse of the Year and a 1970 U.S. Racing Hall of Fame inductee.

== Pedigree ==
Pedigree of Busanda, black mare, foaled 1947
Sire War Admiral br. 1934	Man o' War ch. 1917	Fair Play ch. 1905	Hastings
Sire War Admiral br. 1934	Man o' War ch. 1917	Fair Play ch. 1905	Fairy Gold (GB)
Sire War Admiral br. 1934	Man o' War ch. 1917	Mahubah b. 1910	Rock Sand (GB)
Sire War Admiral br. 1934	Man o' War ch. 1917	Mahubah b. 1910	Merry Token (GB)
Sire War Admiral br. 1934	Brushup b. 1929	Sweep br. 1907	Ben Brush
Sire War Admiral br. 1934	Brushup b. 1929	Sweep br. 1907	Pink Domino
Sire War Admiral br. 1934	Brushup b. 1929	Annette K. b. 1921	Harry of Hereford (GB)
Sire War Admiral br. 1934	Brushup b. 1929	Annette K. b. 1921	Bathing Girl (IRE)
Dam Businesslike br. 1939	Blue Larkspur b. 1926	Black Servant br. 1918	Black Toney
Dam Businesslike br. 1939	Blue Larkspur b. 1926	Black Servant br. 1918	Padula (IRE)
Dam Businesslike br. 1939	Blue Larkspur b. 1926	Blossom Time br. 1920	North Star III (GB)
Dam Businesslike br. 1939	Blue Larkspur b. 1926	Blossom Time br. 1920	Vaila (IRE)
Dam Businesslike br. 1939	La Troienne (FR) b. 1926	Teddy (FR) b. 1913	Ajax (FR)
Dam Businesslike br. 1939	La Troienne (FR) b. 1926	Teddy (FR) b. 1913	Rondeau (GB)
Dam Businesslike br. 1939	La Troienne (FR) b. 1926	Helene de Troie (FR) b. 1916	Helicon (GB)
Dam Businesslike br. 1939	La Troienne (FR) b. 1926	Helene de Troie (FR) b. 1916	Lady of Pedigree (GB)
