= Wavering Monarch =

American thoroughbred racehorse

- Breed: Thoroughbred
- Sire: Majestic Light
- Grandsire: Majestic Prince
- Dam: Uncommitted
- Damsire: Buckpasser
- Foaled: February 22, 1979
- Died: June 17, 2004
- Country: United States
- Breeder: Glencrest Farm LLC (Greathouse family)
- Owner: Glencrest Farm LLC (Greathouse family)
- Trainer: Rusty Arnold; Lazaro S. Barrera
- Record: 13:6-1-3

Major wins
- Haskell Invitational Stakes (1982); Omaha Gold Cup (1982); San Fernando Stakes (1983)
- Last updated on January 24, 2020

Wavering Monarch (February 22, 1979 - June 17, 2004) was an American Thoroughbred racehorse and the winner of the 1983 San Fernando Stakes.

== Career ==
Trained by Rusty Arnold, Wavering Monarch's first race was on February 22, 1979, at Keeneland where he came in 1st. He won his next race on April 14, 1982, which was also at Keeneland.

Wavering Monarch competed in the 1982 Kentucky Derby, coming in 12th. He went on to win the Omaha Gold Cup at Ak-Sar-Ben on July 3, 1982, then followed it up with a win in the Haskell Invitational Stakes on July 31.

Wavering Monarch would not see victory again until January 3, 1983, when he won the 1983 San Fernando Stakes for new trainer Laz Barrera. He finished his career soon after with a third-place finish in the Santa Anita Handicap on March 6, 1983.

Wavering Monarch died on June 17, 2004, due to issues stemming from old age.

== Stud career ==
Wavering Monarch's descendants include:

c = colt, f = filly

Foaled	Name	Sex	Major Wins
1987	Wavering Girl	f	Colin Stakes, Natalma Stakes, Victoria Stakes
1987	Overturned	c	Arlington Oaks, Rare Treat Handicap
1989	Fluttery Danseur	c	Beaumont Stakes, Sorority Stakes, Landaluce Stakes
1991	King's Blade	c	Bing Crosby Stakes
1993	Maria's Mon	c	Belmont Futurity Stakes, Sanford Stakes, Champagne Stakes
1993	A. V. Eight	c	Bashford Manor Stakes

== Pedigree ==
Pedigree of Wavering Monarch (USA), 1979
Sire Majestic Light (USA) 1973	Majestic Prince (USA); 1966	Raise a Native	Native Dancer
Sire Majestic Light (USA) 1973	Majestic Prince (USA); 1966	Raise a Native	Raise You
Sire Majestic Light (USA) 1973	Majestic Prince (USA); 1966	Gay Hostess	Royal Charger
Sire Majestic Light (USA) 1973	Majestic Prince (USA); 1966	Gay Hostess	Your Hostess
Sire Majestic Light (USA) 1973	Irradiate (USA); 1966	Ribot	Tenerani
Sire Majestic Light (USA) 1973	Irradiate (USA); 1966	Ribot	Romanella
Sire Majestic Light (USA) 1973	Irradiate (USA); 1966	High Voltage	Ambiorix
Sire Majestic Light (USA) 1973	Irradiate (USA); 1966	High Voltage	Dynamo
Dam Uncommitted (USA) 1974	Buckpasser (USA); 1963	Tom Fool	Menow
Dam Uncommitted (USA) 1974	Buckpasser (USA); 1963	Tom Fool	Gaga
Dam Uncommitted (USA) 1974	Buckpasser (USA); 1963	Busanda	War Admiral
Dam Uncommitted (USA) 1974	Buckpasser (USA); 1963	Busanda	Businesslike
Dam Uncommitted (USA) 1974	Lady Be Good (USA); 1956	Better Self	Bimelech
Dam Uncommitted (USA) 1974	Lady Be Good (USA); 1956	Better Self	Free Mac
Dam Uncommitted (USA) 1974	Lady Be Good (USA); 1956	Past Eight	Eight Thirty
Dam Uncommitted (USA) 1974	Lady Be Good (USA); 1956	Past Eight	Helvetia
