= Maria's Mon =

American Thoroughbred racehorse

- Sire: Wavering Monarch
- Grandsire: Majestic Light
- Dam: Carlotta Maria
- Damsire: Caro
- Sex: Stallion
- Foaled: April 24, 1993
- Country: United States
- Colour: Gray
- Breeder: Morton Rosenthal
- Owner: Mrs. Morton Rosenthal
- Trainer: Richard Schosberg
- Record: 7:4-1-1
- Earnings: US$ 507,140

Major wins
- Sanford Stakes (1995); Belmont Futurity Stakes (1995); Champagne Stakes (1995)

Honours
- American Champion Two-Year-Old Colt (1995)

Maria's Mon (April 24, 1993 – September 14, 2007) was an American Thoroughbred racehorse that was the champion two-year-old colt in 1995 and produced two Kentucky Derby winners.

Maria's Mon was foaled in Kentucky on April 24, 1993, at the farm of Morton Rosenthal. He was sired by Wavering Monarch out of Carlotta Maria. Carlotta Maria was sired by the Irish stallion Caro. Maria's Mon was retired from racing due to a broken ankle.

Maria's Mon was retired to Pin Oak Stud and is the sire of Kentucky Derby winners Monarchos (2001) and Super Saver (2010). His stud fee in 2007 was $60,000 for a live foal and he covered 132 mares in his last season. Maria's Mon died of severe laminitis, which may have resulted from equine Cushing's syndrome, on September 14, 2007, at Hagyard Equine Medical Institute in Lexington, Kentucky.

== Pedigree ==
Pedigree of Maria’s Mon, Gray colt, April 24, 1993
Sire Wavering Monarch	Majestic Light	Majestic Prince	Raise a Native
Sire Wavering Monarch	Majestic Light	Majestic Prince	Gay Hostess
Sire Wavering Monarch	Majestic Light	Irradiate	Ribot
Sire Wavering Monarch	Majestic Light	Irradiate	High Voltage
Sire Wavering Monarch	Uncommitted	Buckpasser	Tom Fool
Sire Wavering Monarch	Uncommitted	Buckpasser	Busanda
Sire Wavering Monarch	Uncommitted	Lady Be Good	Better Self
Sire Wavering Monarch	Uncommitted	Lady Be Good	Past Eight
Dam Carlotta Maria	Caro	Fortino	Grey Sovereign
Dam Carlotta Maria	Caro	Fortino	Ranavalo
Dam Carlotta Maria	Caro	Chambord	Chamossaire
Dam Carlotta Maria	Caro	Chambord	Life Hill
Dam Carlotta Maria	Water Malone	Naskra	Nasram
Dam Carlotta Maria	Water Malone	Naskra	Iskra
Dam Carlotta Maria	Water Malone	Gray Matter	Stratmat
Dam Carlotta Maria	Water Malone	Gray Matter	Songcraft (family: 1-1)
