= Numbered Account (horse) =

American Thoroughbred racehorse

- Numbered Account's grave at Claiborne Farm
- Sire: Buckpasser
- Grandsire: Tom Fool
- Dam: Intriguing
- Damsire: Swaps
- Sex: Mare
- Foaled: 1969
- Country: United States
- Color: Bay
- Breeder: Ogden Phipps
- Owner: Ogden Phipps
- Trainer: Roger Laurin
- Record: 22: 14-3-2
- Earnings: US$607,048

Major wins
- Fashion Stakes (1971); Frizette Stakes (1971); Gardenia Stakes (1971); Matron Stakes (1971); Schuylerville Stakes (1971); Selima Stakes (1971); Maskette Stakes (1972); Matchmaker Stakes (1972); Prioress Stakes (1972); Spinster Stakes (1972); Spinaway Stakes (1972); Test Stakes (1972)

Awards
- American Champion Two-Year-Old Filly (1971)

Numbered Account (1969–1996) was an American Thoroughbred racehorse who was voted the American Champion Two-Year-Old Filly of 1971. She was bred and raced by Ogden Phipps and trained by Roger Laurin.

On May 19, 1971, Numbered Account set a Fashion Stakes record of 0:57 2/5 for five furlongs on dirt at Aqueduct Racetrack. On October 22, 1972, in winning the Spinster Stakes she equaled the Keeneland track record of 1:47 2/5 for 1 1/8 miles (9 furlongs) on dirt set by Round Table in 1957.

Numbered Account retired in 1974 after three years in racing having won fourteen of her twenty-two starts and $607,048. She was sent to broodmare duty at Claiborne Farm near Paris, Kentucky. Of her best foals, she was the dam of Grade 1 winners Dance Number (by Northern Dancer) and Private Account (by Damascus) who sired Personal Ensign. She also appears twice in the pedigree of 2014 Kentucky Derby winner California Chrome.
