= Barbaro (horse) =

American-bred Thoroughbred racehorse

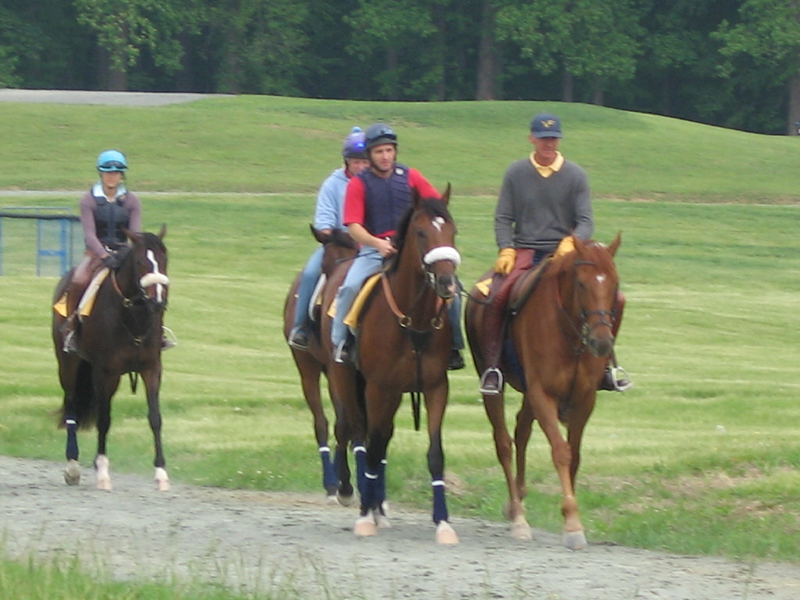
- Barbaro (middle) walking to the track at the Fair Hill Training Center in May 2006, a week after winning the Kentucky Derby
- Sire: Dynaformer
- Grandsire: Roberto
- Dam: La Ville Rouge
- Damsire: Carson City
- Sex: Colt
- Foaled: April 29, 2003; Sanborn Chase Farm, Nicholasville, Kentucky, U.S.
- Died: January 29, 2007 (aged 4); New Bolton Center at the University of Pennsylvania , U.S.
- Country: United States
- Colour: Bay
- Breeder: H. Roy and Gretchen Jackson
- Owner: Lael Stables
- Trainer: Michael R. Matz
- Record: 7:6-0-0 (1 DNF)
- Earnings: $2,302,221

Major wins
- Laurel Futurity (2005); Tropical Park Derby (2006); Holy Bull Stakes (2006); Florida Derby (2006); Triple Crown race wins: Kentucky Derby (2006)

Awards
- NTRA "Moment of the Year" (2006)

Honours
- Barbaro Stakes at Pimlico Race Course; Barbaro Stakes at Delaware Park; Statue at Churchill Downs

Barbaro (April 29, 2003 – January 29, 2007) was a champion American Thoroughbred racehorse. He won the 2006 Kentucky Derby, but shattered his leg two weeks later in the Preakness Stakes, which ended his racing career and eventually led to the decision to euthanize him. Barbaro was a third-generation descendant of Mr. Prospector, and as such Barbaro was related to many notable racehorses including Afleet Alex, Smarty Jones, Funny Cide, and Fusaichi Pegasus.

On May 20, 2006, Barbaro ran in the Preakness Stakes as a heavy favorite, but, after a false start, he fractured three bones in and around the fetlock of his right hind leg. The injury ruined any chance of a Triple Crown in 2006 and ended his racing career. The next day, he underwent surgery at the New Bolton Center at the University of Pennsylvania for his injuries. In July, he developed laminitis in his left rear foot. He was rushed to the hospital, where he underwent five further operations, and his prognosis varied during an exceptionally long stay in the Equine Intensive Care Unit at the New Bolton Center. After his right hind leg eventually healed, he developed further laminitis in both front hooves. His veterinarians and owners concluded that he could not be saved, and Barbaro was euthanized on January 29, 2007.

== Background ==
Barbaro was bred and owned by Gretchen and Roy Jackson's Lael Stables of West Grove, Pennsylvania.

Barbaro was trained by Michael R. Matz at Fair Hill Training Center. During his racing career he was ridden by Edgar Prado and Jose Caraballo. Neither jockey rode him at any time other than in his races: Peter Brette was his regular exercise rider.

== Racing career ==
Barbaro was undefeated in his first 5 starts.

He was sent off as the second choice in the Kentucky Derby at odds of 6:1, in a full field of twenty horses. Barbaro charged ahead during the last turn and straightaway of the race to win by six and a half lengths. Barbaro's lead in the final furlong expanded, although jockey Edgar Prado did not use the whip and ask for his top speed. This margin of victory at the Kentucky Derby was the largest since 1946, when Triple Crown winner Assault took the "Run for the Roses" by eight lengths. Barbaro's win made him only the sixth undefeated horse to win the Kentucky Derby. Barbaro had not competed for five weeks prior to the race, since the Grade I Florida Derby, which was the longest layoff in 50 years for a Derby winner.

== Injury ==
Barbaro's Preakness Stakes began with a false start when he broke from the starting gate prematurely, slamming his head against the metal retractable door. Although he was stunned, trainer Michael Matz opted to abide by the implied judgment of Barbaro's jockey that the horse was fit to run. He was also disoriented by Matz's change in pre-saddling procedure. Barbaro was erroneously deemed fit upon being reloaded into the gate. As the restarted race began, Barbaro broke cleanly but suffered a catastrophic injury as the horses passed the grandstand shortly after the start.

Many theories arose as to the cause of the accident, though none have been confirmed. Ignoring the disorientation and consequent stumbling of a horse who had slammed his head against a metal door just seconds earlier, horse industry theorists focus on the injury itself. Barbaro broke his right hind leg in more than 20 places: a broken cannon bone above the pastern, a broken sesamoid bone behind the fetlock, and a broken long pastern bone below the fetlock. The fetlock joint was dislocated, and his foot was left dangling loosely. Veteran jockey Edgar Prado immediately pulled Barbaro up and brought him to a gentle stop. He dismounted and leaned his shoulder into the horse's shoulder to support Barbaro until track attendants could arrive. Bernardini with Javier Castellano as jockey went on to win the race.

Barbaro's injuries were life-threatening. Unlike other mammals, such as dogs, a horse cannot survive in humane circumstances on three legs. A broken leg in a horse can lead to complications as the other legs attempt to bear the weight of the horse's body.

=== Initial surgery ===
In 1971, Hoist The Flag underwent successful pioneering surgery for an injury similar to that suffered by Barbaro. Having been taken to the University of Pennsylvania's New Bolton Center in Kennett Square, Pennsylvania for treatment, Barbaro was assigned to the care of equine surgeon Dr. Dean Richardson. The New Bolton Center is renowned for its specialized care, especially for animals needing complicated bone surgery. The day after the race, Richardson performed a fusion of the fetlock and pastern joints to stabilize the leg and make it strong enough for Barbaro to walk on. It was a five-hour procedure and was one of the most difficult surgeries Richardson had performed. The surgical team successfully implanted a Synthes stainless steel Locking Compression Plate (LCP) and 27 screws into the colt's injured leg to span the comminuted fracture and joints. They used the LCP because its screws thread into the plate to provide maximum strength. Richardson was one of the first equine surgeons to implement this new technology, originally designed for humans. A fiberglass cast was placed over the LCP to further protect the construct. Barbaro was put into a recovery pool at 7:40 pm.

After about an hour in the pool, at around 9:00 p.m. EDT, Barbaro began to calmly awaken from the anesthesia. He stood and then practically jogged to his stall. He ate and was able to comfortably put weight on the injured leg. The blood supply to the injury site was very good, but Richardson still gave Barbaro a 50–50 chance of survival. By the following morning, Barbaro was already showing interest in some of the mares at the facility. He was walking well on his limb around the stall and was quite active for his condition; his first week of recovery went well. The cast was replaced on June 13 and again on July 3.

=== Complications ===
In the first week of July, complications arose, and Barbaro had problems with both hind legs. He developed an abscess in his uninjured left foot, which was treated topically, but he carried a fever through the weekend and failed to put weight on his injured right foot for any significant time.

By July 13, Barbaro had developed a severe case of laminitis in the left hind hoof—a potentially life-threatening affliction that is common in horses who shift weight to one hoof for extended periods to keep pressure off an injured hoof. A procedure called a hoof wall resection removed 80% of his left rear hoof. The remaining 20% of his hoof wall was attached to the coffin bone and was still living tissue, but it was unclear how much of it would grow back. Both rear legs were in casts. Richardson stated that his plans were to restrict himself to aggressive but standard treatments; he would use no experimental procedures. Barbaro was given a special support boot for his laminitic hoof and placed on painkillers; a support sling was brought into his stall to allow him to take the weight off his hooves for hours at a time.

=== Recovery ===
On August 8, Barbaro's broken right leg had fused to the point where the veterinarians would have replaced the cast with a brace if his left leg had been sound. The coronet band (the area from which the hoof grows) on his left leg appeared healthy and all signs were encouraging. On August 15, it was reported that Barbaro had been allowed to graze outside for the first time since his accident. Two days later, Barbaro was no longer using the sling to support his weight, and its use was discontinued. The next day, August 18, radiographs showed that his fractured right leg was almost completely fused.

By September 26, it was decided that Barbaro's cast would not be replaced as long as he was comfortable in it. His left hind hoof had regrown about 18 millimeters, and the support shoe had been replaced with a bandage. The hoof would have to grow to at least three times that length, a process that could take more than six months.

On October 10, Barbaro's cast and protective shoe were changed. His left rear hoof was gradually improving from laminitis. There was good growth along the quarters (closer to the heel), but months of healing were still required for the front of the hoof.

Barbaro reached another milestone on November 6, 2006, when his cast was removed permanently and replaced with a splinted bandage. His laminitic hoof showed no new problems, but several months of growth would have been necessary before it could be further diagnosed. Around December 12, Barbaro's bandage on his right hind leg was removed completely. This was announced during a press conference on Wednesday, December 13.

=== Further complications and death ===
Early in January 2007, the laminitic left hoof became the source of further complications. On January 10, another section of the hoof was surgically removed. Updates over the next few days revealed that the cast had been reapplied to Barbaro's right hind leg for support and that aggressive pain management and the use of the support sling had been resumed. Nevertheless, Barbaro's condition was better than it had been the previous July.

In another setback, Barbaro developed a deep abscess in his right hind foot, a problem generally caused by lack of grip exercise. Additional surgery was performed on January 27 to insert two steel pins into the healed bones of his right foot as part of an external skeletal fixation device. This would allow the right foot to bear more weight, but the procedure was risky, with the major danger being that the bones might break again. Later that same weekend, Barbaro's front hooves, which had remained healthy throughout the ordeal, displayed clear signs of laminitis because the horse was unable to bear weight on his hind legs. Thus, Barbaro could not then comfortably put his weight on any of his legs.

Barbaro was euthanized on January 29, 2007, at around 10:30 a.m. EST by decision of his owners Roy and Gretchen Jackson, who indicated that they felt that his pain was no longer manageable.

For his efforts to save Barbaro, the Turf Publicists of America voted to award Richardson their 2006 Big Sport of Turfdom Award.

=== Memorial ===
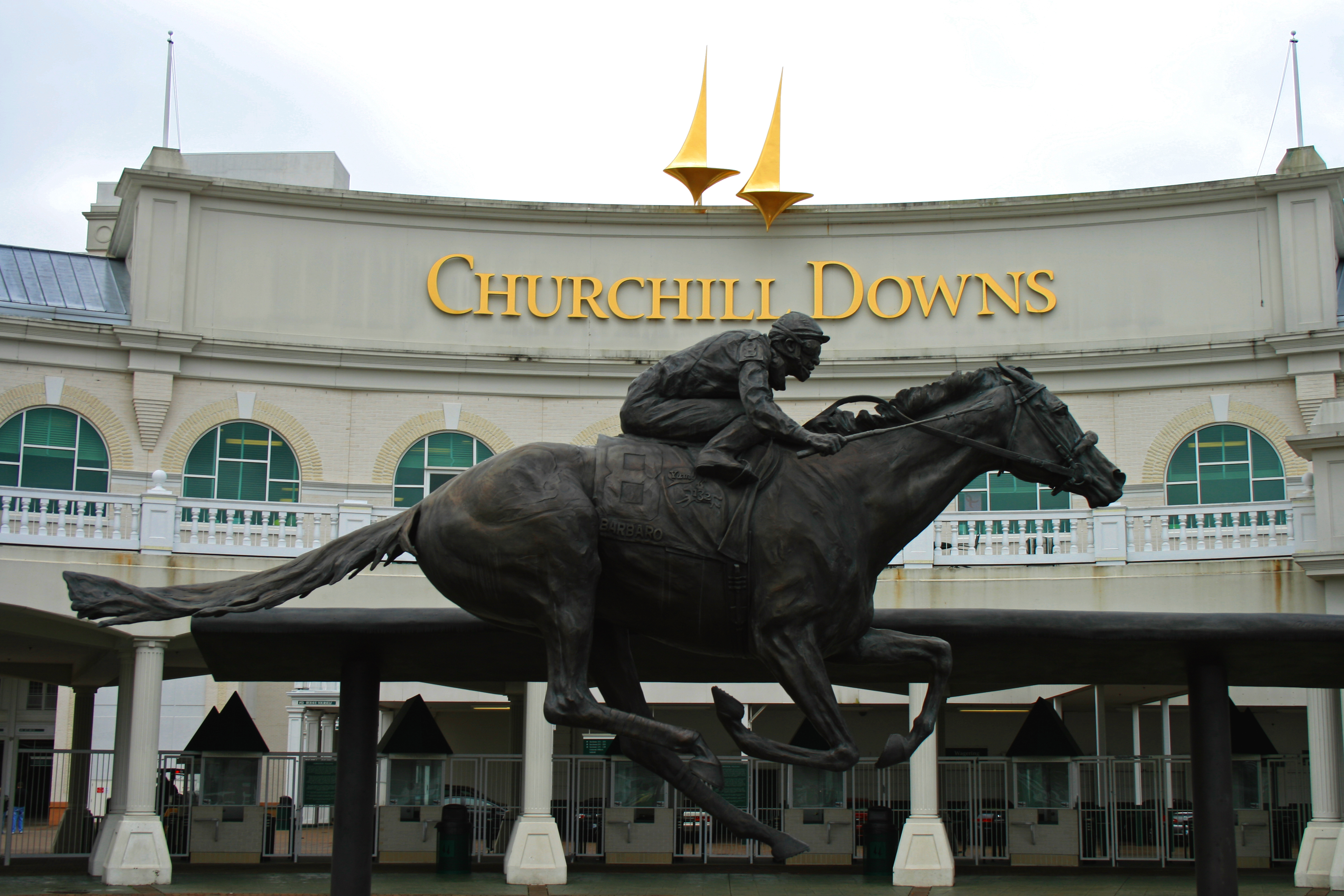
Monument and statue honoring Barbaro at entrance to Churchill Downs.

Barbaro was cremated shortly after he was euthanized. On January 29, 2008, it was announced that his remains would be interred in front of an entrance to Churchill Downs and that a bronze statue of Barbaro would be placed atop his remains. The Jacksons chose to place his remains outside of both Churchill Downs and the adjacent Kentucky Derby Museum to allow his many admirers to pay their respects without having to pay an admission fee.

The Barbaro Sculpture, created by Alexa King, was unveiled April 26, 2009, at Churchill Downs, the week preceding the Kentucky Derby.

Gulfstream Park established scholarships to the University of Florida with an initial total funding of $30,000 for two fourth-year students in Veterinary Medicine and one graduate student in equine veterinary research.

Barbaro also inspired a large anonymous donation to the New Bolton Center, allowing the establishment of the Barbaro Fund to aid the treatment and care of large animals.

In 2006, a Limited Edition Ty Beanie Babies Barbaro Beanie plushie was released. The plushie is 7 inches tall, 8 inches long and wears Barbaro's No. 8 on a pink saddle cloth.

In 2007, Breyer Animal Creations released a Barbaro model that includes a Certificate of Authenticity from his owners, jockey, and main doctor at the New Bolton Center.

The Jacksons have endowed a chair for equine disease research at the University of Pennsylvania's veterinary school.

In honor of Barbaro's fight against his injuries in the 2006 Preakness Stakes, NTRA has established the NTRA Charities, Barbaro Memorial Fund. This fund will focus on Equine Health and Safety, which will include research to find a cure for laminitis, the disease that ultimately led to Barbaro's death.

=== Public reaction ===
After his breakdown in the Preakness, Barbaro became the object of public affection. His stall at the New Bolton Center was decorated with many thousands of Get Well cards (including a 7 by 72 feet (2.1 m × 21.9 m) card from fans at the Belmont Stakes), and flowers and presents sent in by fans. Others sent in items meant to help his recovery, such as Christian medallions and holy water. His condition was reported by news organizations on a daily basis.

Over the course of Barbaro's treatment and after his death, some sections of the media felt that Barbaro did not merit the amount of attention that he was receiving from either his supporters or the media. Others suggested that Barbaro had demonstrated a disposition that might enable him to survive and in time become a breeding stallion. Time magazine commented that despite the difficulties, Barbaro's fight was inspiring and that the hope for a near-miracle was not pointless.

== Pedigree ==
Pedigree of Barbaro
| Sire Dynaformer dk. b/br. 1985 | Roberto b. 1969 | Hail To Reason br. 1958 | Turn-To |
| Sire Dynaformer dk. b/br. 1985 | Roberto b. 1969 | Hail To Reason br. 1958 | Nothirdchance |
| Sire Dynaformer dk. b/br. 1985 | Roberto b. 1969 | Bramalea dk. b/br. 1959 | Nashua |
| Sire Dynaformer dk. b/br. 1985 | Roberto b. 1969 | Bramalea dk. b/br. 1959 | Rarelea |
| Sire Dynaformer dk. b/br. 1985 | Andover Way dk. b/br. 1978 | His Majesty b. 1968 | Ribot |
| Sire Dynaformer dk. b/br. 1985 | Andover Way dk. b/br. 1978 | His Majesty b. 1968 | Flower Bowl |
| Sire Dynaformer dk. b/br. 1985 | Andover Way dk. b/br. 1978 | On The Trail b. 1964 | Olympia |
| Sire Dynaformer dk. b/br. 1985 | Andover Way dk. b/br. 1978 | On The Trail b. 1964 | Golden Trail |
| Dam La Ville Rouge b. 1996 | Carson City ch. 1987 | Mr. Prospector b. 1970 | Raise a Native |
| Dam La Ville Rouge b. 1996 | Carson City ch. 1987 | Mr. Prospector b. 1970 | Gold Digger |
| Dam La Ville Rouge b. 1996 | Carson City ch. 1987 | Blushing Promise b. 1982 | Blushing Groom |
| Dam La Ville Rouge b. 1996 | Carson City ch. 1987 | Blushing Promise b. 1982 | Summertime Promise |
| Dam La Ville Rouge b. 1996 | La Reine Rouge b. 1978 | King's Bishop b. 1969 | Round Table |
| Dam La Ville Rouge b. 1996 | La Reine Rouge b. 1978 | King's Bishop b. 1969 | Spearfish |
| Dam La Ville Rouge b. 1996 | La Reine Rouge b. 1978 | Silver Betsy b. 1971 | Nearctic |
| Dam La Ville Rouge b. 1996 | La Reine Rouge b. 1978 | Silver Betsy b. 1971 | Silver Abbey |

Barbaro has four full brothers, three of which have raced, Nicanor (retired), Lentenor (retired), and Margano.

== Racing career ==
| Date | Race | Track | Location | Distance | Surface | Condition | Finish |
|---|---|---|---|---|---|---|---|
| October 4, 2005 | Maiden | Delaware Park | Wilmington, Delaware | 1 mi. | Turf | Firm | 1st |
| November 19, 2005 | Laurel Futurity | Laurel Park Racecourse | Laurel, Maryland | 1 1/16 mi. | Turf | Firm | 1st |
| January 1, 2006 | Tropical Park Derby | Calder Race Course | Miami Gardens, Florida | 1 1/8 mi. | Turf | Firm | 1st |
| February 4, 2006 | Holy Bull Stakes | Gulfstream Park | Hallandale Beach, Florida | 1 1/8 mi. | Dirt | Sloppy | 1st |
| April 1, 2006 | Florida Derby | Gulfstream Park | Hallandale Beach, Florida | 1 1/8 mi. | Dirt | Fast | 1st |
| May 6, 2006 | Kentucky Derby | Churchill Downs | Louisville, Kentucky | 1 1/4 mi. | Dirt | Fast | 1st |
| May 20, 2006 | Preakness Stakes | Pimlico Race Course | Baltimore, Maryland | 1 3/16 mi. | Dirt | Fast | DNF, injury |

== Honors ==
- Pimlico Racecourse has renamed the Sir Barton Stakes the Barbaro Stakes. The race is a part of the Preakness Stakes Day undercard. The winner of the first Barbaro Stakes on May 19, 2007, was Chelokee, a three-year-old colt trained by Michael Matz.
- Delaware Park Racetrack renamed the Leonard Richards Stakes, a Grade III race for three-year-olds, the Barbaro Stakes. Its inaugural running took place on Sunday, July 15, 2007, and was won by Xchanger.

== Books ==
Several books have been written about Barbaro. In 2007, HarperCollins published Barbaro: A Nation's Love Story written by Pamela K. Brodowsky and Tom Philbin. Barbaro, Smarty Jones & Ruffian: The People's Horses, written by Linda Hanna was published in 2008 by Middle Atlantic Press as was My Guy Barbaro: A Jockey's Journey Through Love, Triumph, and Heartbreak with America's Favorite Horse written by Edgar Prado, Barbaro's Derby-winning jockey, co-written by John Eisenberg and published by HarperCollins. In 2011, Alex Brown authored Greatness and Goodness: Barbaro and His Legacy, which was authorized by Barbaro's owners, the Jacksons, and examined Barbaro's life and his enduring legacy.

== Feature film ==
In 2007 Universal Pictures announced director Peter Berg would produce and direct a feature film entitled Gone Like the Wind, based on an article published in Vanity Fair by Buzz Bissinger. Berg and Bissinger previously worked together on Friday Night Lights. Sarah Aubrey was announced as co-producer. The film was shelved indefinitely in favor of the Peter Berg-directed Battleship.

== See also ==
- List of leading Thoroughbred racehorses
- List of racehorses
