= Suwannee River Stakes =

- Class: Grade III
- Location: Gulfstream Park; Hallandale Beach, Florida, United States
- Inaugurated: 1947
- Race type: Thoroughbred – Flat racing
- Website: www.pimlico.com

Race information
- Distance: 1 1/8 miles (9 furlongs)
- Surface: Turf
- Track: Left-handed
- Qualification: fillies and mares four-year-olds
- Weight: 124 pounds with allowances
- Purse: US$125,000 (2021)

The Suwannee River Stakes is a Thoroughbred horse race run at Gulfstream Park located in Hallandale Beach, Florida. Open to fillies and mares four-year-olds and up, the Grade III event is set at a distance of 9 furlongs or one and one eighth mile on the turf. The Suwannee River currently offers a purse of $125,000 and is run under allowance weight conditions. Prior to 2009, it was run as a Handicap

The race itself was named after Stephen Foster's song "Old Folks at Home" (known better by the name "Suwannee River"). It is now the state of Florida's state song.

The race was inaugurated in 1947. It was held as an overnight handicap between 1948 and 1950–1952. The race was not held in 1949. It was given grade-three status from 1973–1978 and again from 1982–present. The race had been run at six furlongs, seven furlongs, one mile, one and one sixteenth miles and its current distance of one and one eighth miles. The race itself has been so popular among trainers that the race has been run in two divisions many years and in three divisions in three separate years.

== Records ==
Speed record:

- 1-1/8 miles – 1:45.38 – Dickinson (2017)
- 1-1/16 miles – 1:45.10 – Vigorous Lady (1991)
- 1-mile – 1:34.60 – Jabot (1976)
- 7 furlongs – 1:22.40- Airmans Guide (1961)

Most wins by a jockey:

- 6 – Jerry D. Bailey (1983, 1984, 1992, 1993, 1995, 1997)
- 5 – Craig Perret (1979, 1982, 1987, 1988, 1989)
- 4 – Jean-Luc Samyn (1981, 1981, 1986 & 2003)

Most wins by a trainer:

- 5 – Christophe Clement (1995, 2003, 2005, 2007, 2008)
- 4 – Thomas J. Skiffington Jr. (1987, 1988, 1989, 2001)
- 4 – Harry Trotsek (1955, 1977, 1982 & 1984)

Most wins by an owner:

- 4 – Edward A. Seltzer (1982, 1984, 1987, 1989)

== Winners ==
| Year | Winner | Age | Jockey | Trainer | Owner | Distance | Time | Purse |
|---|---|---|---|---|---|---|---|---|
| 2022 | Stolen Holiday | 4 | Junior Alvarado | Claude R. McGaughey III | Annette Allen | 1 1/8 miles | 1:34.32 | $125,000 |
| 2021 | Sweet Melania | 4 | John Velazquez | Todd Pletcher | Robert and Lawana Low | 1 1/8 miles | 1:34.19 | $100,000 |
| 2020 | Starship Jubilee | 7 | Luis Saez | Kevin Attard | Blue Heaven Farm | 1 1/8 miles | 1:47.54 | $150,000 |
| 2019 | Valedictorian | 5 | Tyler Gaffalione | Kelly Breen | Epic Racing | 1 1/8 miles | 1:50.12 | $150,000 |
| 2018 | Elysea's World | 5 | Javier Castellano | Chad C. Brown | Sheep Pond Part/All Pro Rac | 1 1/8 miles | 1:47.75 | $150,000 |
| 2017 | Dickinson | 5 | Paco Lopez | Kiaran McLaughlin | Godolphin Racing LLC | 1 1/8 miles | 1:45.38 | $150,000 |
| 2016 | Tammy the Torpedo | 4 | Joel Rosario | Chad C. Brown | Long Lake Stable/Beacon Hill | 1 1/8 miles | 1:48.28 | $150,000 |
| 2015 | Sandiva (IRE) | 4 | Javier Castellano | Todd Pletcher | Al Shaqab Racing | 1 1/8 miles | 1:47.31 | $150,000 |
| 2014 | Parranda | 5 | Jose Lezcano | Rodolfo Garcia | Lone Stable | 1 1/8 miles | 1:49.07 | $150,000 |
| 2013 | Channel Lady | 5 | Javier Castellano | Claude McGaughey III | Phipps Stable | 1 1/8 miles | 1:48.82 | $150,000 |
| 2012 | Snow Top Mountain | 5 | Jose Lezcano | Thomas F. Proctor | Barbara Hunter | 1 1/8 miles | 1:52.86 | $150,000 |
| 2011 | Cherokee Queen | 6 | Alex Solis | Martin D. Wolfson | Farnsworth Stables LLC | 1 1/8 miles | 1:46.62 | $150,000 |
| 2010 | Tottie | 4 | Jose Lezcano | Chad C. Brown | J. H. Richmond-Watson | 1 1/8 miles | 1:50.34 | $125,000 |
| 2009 | Lady Carlock | 5 | Jermaine Bridgmohan | Carl Nafzger | Bentley Smith | 1 1/8 miles | 1:47.65 | $125,000 |
| 2008 | La Dolce Vita | 6 | Kent Desormeaux | Christophe Clement | Ronchalon Stable | 1 1/8 miles | 1:46.64 | $100,000 |
| 2007 | Naissance Royale | 5 | Edgar Prado | Christophe Clement | Monceaux Stable | 1 1/8 miles | 1:46.58 | $100,000 |
| 2006 | Eyes on Eddy | 4 | Rafael Bejarano | Paul J. McGee | Ralls & Foster LLC | 1 1/8 miles | 1:49.56 | $100,000 |
| 2005 | Snowdrops | 5 | Edgar Prado | Christophe Clement | Howard G. Spinks | 1 1/8 miles | 1:46.40 | $100,000 |
| 2004 | Wishful Splendor | 5 | José Santos | Sal Russo | John B. Manganaro Jr. | 1 1/8 miles | 1:54.86 | $100,000 |
| 2003 | Amonita | 5 | Jean-Luc Samyn | Christophe Clement | Haras du Mezeray | 1 1/8 miles | 1:47.90 | $100,000 |
| 2002 | Snow Dance | 4 | Pat Day | John T. Ward Jr. | John C. Oxley | 1 1/8 miles | 1:49.04 | $100,000 |
| 2001 | Spook Express | 3 | Mike E. Smith | Thomas Skiffington Jr. | Kinloch Enterprises | 1 1/8 miles | 1:47.28 | $60,000 |
| 2000 | Pico Teneriffe | 4 | Jorge F. Chavez | Todd A. Pletcher | Melnyk Racing Stables | 1 1/8 miles | 1:47.83 | $45,000 |
| 1999 | Winfama | 6 | Richard Migliore | Martin D. Wolfson | Santa Cruz Ranch | 1 1/8 miles | 1:52.38 | $45,000 |
| 1998 | Seebe | 4 | Darci S. Rice | Jonathan Sheppard | Augustin Stable | 1 1/8 miles | 1:47.58 | $45,000 |
| 1997 | Golden Pond | 4 | Jerry D. Bailey | Martin D. Wolfson | David W. Hutson | 1 1/8 miles | 1:47.87 | $45,000 |
| 1996 | Class Kris | 4 | Pat Day | James E. Picou | Fred W. Hooper | 1 1/8 miles | 1:49.17 | $45,000 |
| 1995 | Cox Orange | 5 | Jerry D. Bailey | Christophe Clement | Sheikh Mohammed | 1 1/8 miles | 1:47.43 | $45,000 |
| 1994 | Marshua's River | 7 | José A. Santos | David M. Carroll | James T. Gottwald | 1 1/8 miles | 1:46.68 | $45000 |
| 1993 | Via Borghese | 4 | Jerry D. Bailey | Angel Penna Jr. | Malcolm E. Parrish | 1 1/8 miles | 1:48.22 | $40230 |
| 1992 | Julie La Rousse | 4 | Jerry D. Bailey | Angel Penna Jr. | Malcolm E. Parrish | 1 1/8 miles | 1:48.48 | $38,670 |
| 1991 | Vigorous Lady | 5 | Michael A. Lee | Joseph Bertolino | Monarch Stable, Inc. | 1 1/16 miles | 1:45.10 | $36,120 |
| 1990 | Princess Mora | 4 | Miguel A. González | Jose A. Mendez | Fred Berens & Sol Garazi | 1 1/16 miles | 1:41.20 | $38,970 |
| 1989 # | Love You By Heart | 4 | Randy Romero | John M. Veitch | Daniel M. Galbreath | 1 1/16 miles | 1:41.60 | $37,275 |
| 1989 # | Fieldy | 6 | Craig Perret | Thomas Skiffington | Edward A. Seltzer | 1 1/16 miles | 1:41.60 | $36,975 |
| 1988 # | Go Honey Go | 7 | Julio Pezua | Sonny Hine | Scott C. Savin | 1 1/16 miles | 1:41.80 | $38,490 |
| 1988 # | Anka Germania | 6 | Craig Perret | Thomas Skiffington | Glencrest Farm | 1 1/16 miles | 1:41.80 | $39,090 |
| 1987 # | Fieldy (DH) | 4 | Randy Romero | Thomas Skiffington Jr. | Edward A. Seltzer | 1 1/16 miles | 1:44.20 | $17,810 |
| 1987 # | Fama (DH) | 4 | Craig Perret | Angel Penna Sr. | Jaime Rizo-Patron | 1 1/16 miles | 1:44.20 | $17,810 |
| 1987 # | Singular Bequest | 4 | Earlie Fires | Larry Geiger | Marcel Walder | 1 1/16 miles | 1:43.60 | $26,415 |
| 1986 # | Chesire Kitten | 4 | Jean-Luc Samyn | Sonny Hine | Scott C. Savin | 1 1/16 miles | 1:44.80 | $30,990 |
| 1986 # | Videogenic | 4 | Robbie Davis | Gasper S. Moschera | Albert Davis | 1 1/16 miles | 1:44.60 | $30,960 |
| 1985 # | Early Lunch | 4 | Walter Guerra | James E. Bracken | R. L. Bowen/T. M. Macioce | 1 mile | 1:35.60 | $28,520 |
| 1985 # | Sherizar | 4 | James McKnight | Jim Newman | Eloise McCoy | 1 mile | 1:36.40 | $28,819 |
| 1985 # | Burst of Colors | 5 | José A. Santos | Gary P. Simms | Krulik & Lewis | 1 mile | 1:35.60 | $28,819 |
| 1984 | Sulemeif | 4 | Jerry D. Bailey | Harry Trotsek | Ed Seltzer & Roy Gottlieb | 1 mile | 1:36.80 | $39,330 |
| 1983 # | Norsan | 4 | Jerry D. Bailey | Carlos A. Garcia | Gustave Ring | 1 mile | 1:38.20 | $28.890 |
| 1983 # | Syrianna | 4 | Jacinto Vásquez | David A. Whiteley | Pen-Y-Bryn Farm | 7 furlongs | 1:24.20 | $27,390 |
| 1983 # | Promising Native | 4 | Don MacBeth | Ronnie G. Warren | Ronnie G. Warren | 7 furlongs | 1:23.80 | $27,060 |
| 1982 # | Pine Flower | 4 | Craig Perret | Paul V. Hartz | S. G. Olsson | 1 mile | 1:35.40 | $27,000 |
| 1982 # | Teacher's Pet | 5 | Carlos Marquez | Harry Trotsek | Edward A. Seltzer | 1 mile | 1:35.20 | $27,300 |
| 1981 # | Honey Fox | 4 | Jean-Luc Samyn | Flint S. Schulhofer | Jerome M. Torsney | 1 mile | 1:38.20 | $28,890 |
| 1981 # | Exactly So | 4 | Jean-Luc Samyn | Philip G. Johnson | Robert G. Kluener | 1 mile | 1:35.80 | $22,568 |
| 1980 # | Ouro Verde | 4 | Ramon I. Encinas | Angel Penna Sr. | Daniel Wildenstein | 1 mile | 1:37.20 | $18,870 |
| 1980 # | Just A Game | 4 | Don Brumfield | David A. Whiteley | Peter M. Brant & H. Joseph Allen | 1 mile | 1:35.20 | $18,870 |
| 1979 # | Navajo Princess | 5 | Craig Perret | Douglas Dodson | Glen Oaks Farm | 1 mile | 1:35.20 | $19,650 |
| 1979 # | Calderina | 4 | Jeffrey Fell | J. Bert Sonnier | Owen Helman | 1 mile | 1:36.20 | $19,200 |
| 1978 | Lens Determined | 4 | Jean Cruguet | Duke Davis | Mr. & Mrs. Leonard Smith | 1 mile | 1:35.60 | $19,260 |
| 1977 | Bronze Point | 4 | Heriberto Arroyo | Harry Trotsek | Harold B. Noonan | 7 furlongs | 1:24.20 | $21,390 |
| 1976 | Jabot | 4 | Heliodoro Gustines | Woody Stephens | Claiborne Farm | 1 mile | 1:34.60 | $21,330 |
| 1975 | Deesse Du Val | 4 | Mike Hole | Stephen A. DiMauro | Joan C. Johnson | 1 mile | 1:35.40 | $20,400 |
| 1974 | Dove Creek Lady | 4 | Miguel A. Rivera | Fred Nelson | Margaret V. Dowd | 1 mile | 1:36.40 | $21,960 |
| 1973 | Ziba Blue | 6 | Mike Miceli | Jake B. Dodson | Audley Farm Stable | 1 mile | 1:35.80 | $21,270 |
| 1972 # | Irish Party | 4 | Robert Woodhouse | Victor Morgan | Robert Gasparri | 1 mile | 1:37.20 | $16,470 |
| 1972 # | Stay Out Front | 6 | Jacinto Vásquez | Jerome J. Sarner Jr. | Dorothy De Vries | 1 mile | 1:37.20 | $16,620 |
| 1971 # | Delta Sal | 5 | Walter Blum | Donald H. Divine | W. L. Lyons Brown | 1 mile | 1:35.60 | $15,690 |
| 1971 # | Sign of the Times | 4 | Jacinto Vásquez | Jerome J. Sarner Jr. | Brown Villa Farm | 1 mile | 1:36.00 | $15,990 |
| 1970 # | Blue Rage | 4 | Mickey Solomone | Ronnie G. Warren | Russell Reineman | 1 mile | 1:43.20 | $33,300 |
| 1970 # | Starstrand | 4 | Don MacBeth | James E. Koffman | Karif L. Vangeloff | 1 mile | 1:43.60 | $32,800 |
| 1969 | Spire | 5 | Ray Broussard | Mike Fogarty | George R. Wallace | 1 mile | 1:39.40 | $14,500 |
| 1968 | Ludham | 4 | Kenny Knapp | Frank I. Wright | Happy Hill Farm | 1 1/16 miles | 1:41.80 | $23,300 |
| 1967 | Cologne | 4 | Leroy Moyers | Frank H. Merrill Jr. | Mrs. Romola Voynow | 1 1/16 miles | 1:47.00 | $22,200 |
| 1966 | Wild Note | 4 | Ray Broussard | Douglas Dodson | Mrs. Charles F. Parker | 7 furlongs | 1:22.80 | $13,575 |
| 1965 | Old Hat | 6 | Don Brumfield | Charles C. Norman | Stanley Conrad | 7 furlongs | 1:23.00 | $12,775 |
| 1964 | Smart Deb | 4 | Walter Blum | Arnold N. Winick | Russell Reineman | 7 furlongs | 1:23.00 | $9,600 |
| 1963 | Old Hat | 4 | Howard Grant | Charles C. Norman | Stanley Conrad | 7 furlongs | 1:23.00 | $9,350 |
| 1962 | Coup d'État | 5 | Bill Hartack | Les Lear | Les Lear | 7 furlongs | 1:23.40 | $9,625 |
| 1961 | Airmans Guide | 4 | Bill Hartack | Burton B. Williams | Hugh A. Grant Sr. | 7 furlongs | 1:22.40 | $9,650 |
| 1960 | Royal Native | 4 | Bill Hartack | Kenny Noe Sr. | William B. MacDonald Jr. | 1 1/16 miles | 1:42.00 | $9,075 |
| 1959 | Oil Rich | 4 | Johnny Sellers | Walter A. Kelley | Elmendorf Farm | 1 1/16 miles | 1:44.00 | $9,600 |
| 1958 | Rosewood | 4 | Charles Burr | Horace A. Jones | Calumet Farm | 1 1/16 miles | 1:45.80 | $17,425 |
| 1957 | Estacion | 4 | William M. Cook | Marion H. Van Berg | Marion H. Van Berg | 1 1/16 miles | 1:42.40 | $17,050 |
| 1956 | Tremor | 4 | Bill Shoemaker | Sunny Fitzsimmons | Belair Stud | 1 1/16 miles | 1:43.00 | $10,505 |
| 1955 | Queen Hopeful | 4 | John H. Adams | Harry Trotsek | Hasty House Farm | 1 1/16 miles | 1:43.60 | $10,950 |
| 1954 | Atalanta | 6 | Harrison B. Wilson | Preston M. Burch | Brookmeade Stable | 1 1/16 miles | 1:43.60 | $10,650 |
| 1953 | Sunny Dale | 5 | Kenneth Church | Dwight Denham | Buddah Stable | 1 1/16 miles | 1:44.60 | $17,500 |
| 1952 | Penson | 6 | Kenneth Church | George S. Howell | Mrs. William E. Snell | 1 1/16 miles | 1:44.60 | $1,875 |
| 1951 | Circus Clown | 6 | James Stout | Thomas F. Root Sr. | William J. Walden | 6 furlongs | 1:10.20 | $4,750 |
| 1950 | Theory | 3 | Eldon Nelson | Horace A. Jones | Calumet Farm | 6 furlongs | 1:09.00 | $3,250 |
| 1949 | no race | | | | | | | |
| 1948 | Buzfuz | 6 | Albert Snider | Joe Rosen | Sunshine Stable | 6 furlongs | 1:11.20 | $8,200 |
| 1947 | Ariel Song | 4 | Douglas Dodson | Albert Dunne | Bobanet Stable | 7 furlongs | 1:24.20 | $4,100 |

A # designates that the race was run in multiple divisions that year.
