= Ben Ali Stakes =

- Class: Grade III
- Location: Lexington, Kentucky
- Inaugurated: 1937
- Race type: Thoroughbred – Flat racing

Race information
- Distance: 1 3/16 miles
- Surface: Dirt
- Track: left-handed
- Qualification: Four-year-olds & up
- Purse: US$350,000

The Ben Ali Stakes is an American race for Thoroughbred horses run annually since 1937 at Keeneland Race Course in Lexington, Kentucky. Open to 4-year-olds and up, it is currently a Grade 3 event set at a distance of a mile and one eighth on the dirt course. As of 2025 it offers a purse of $350,000.

According to the official history at Keeneland racetrack, the Ben Ali (pronounced Ah-Lie) is named for James Ben Ali Haggin (1822–1914), a lawyer who made a fortune during the California Gold Rush and who used much of that money to create the biggest horse breeding farm in the world: the Rancho Del Paso near Sacramento, California. He also owned Elmendorf Farm in Lexington, Kentucky with its thousands of acres of prime Kentucky bluegrass. Haggin became a noteworthy breeder of great racehorses and a fervent supporter of the sport. Haggin owned the Hall of Famers, Salvator and the filly, Firenzi.

The first running of the Ben Ali Handicap took place in 1917 at the Lexington Race Course where it was raced through 1932 after which the track closed. It was not run again until the race name was revived at Keeneland in 1937.

Decidedly, the winner of the 1962 Kentucky Derby, won this race in 1963.

== Records ==
Speed records: (Keeneland)

- 1:25.40 - Fulcrum (1960) at 7.0278 furlongs (0.878475 miles)
- 1:41.40 - Decidedly (1963) at 1 1 1/16 mi (9 furlongs; 1,710 m)
- 1:46.63 - Wise Dan (2012) at 1 1/8 mi (9 furlongs; 1,811 m)
- 1:56.48 - Rattle N Roll (2023) at 1 3/16 mi (10 furlongs; 1,911 m)

Most wins:

- 3 - Knight Counter (1972, 1973, 1974)

Most wins by a jockey:

- 5 - Don Brumfield (1964, 1972, 1973, 1984, 1988)
- 5 - Javier Castellano (2006, 2011, 2015, 2018, 2022)

Most wins by a trainer:

- 5 - Neil J. Howard (1999, 2003, 2004, 2005, 2016)

Most wins by an owner:

- 5 - Calumet Farm (1937, 1945, 1947, 1948, 1951)
- 5 - William S. Farish III (1999, 2003, 2004, 2005, 2016)

== Winners ==
Year	Winner	Age	Jockey	Trainer	Owner	Dist. (Miles)	Time	Gr.
1937	Count Morse	4	Irving Anderson	Frank J. Kearns	Calumet Farm	1 1/16 M	1:46.20	
1938	Main Man	4	Willis F. Ward	Howard C. Hoffman	Jerome B. Respess	1 1/16 M	1:45.00	
1939	Burning Star	5	Warren Yarberry	John J. Greely Jr.	Shandon Farm Stable (Patrick A. & Richard J. Nash)	1 1/16 M	1:47.00	
1940	Arabs Arrow	6	Carrol Bierman	Gilbert Hardy	Louise J. Hickman	1 1/16 M	1:48.80	
1941	Red Dock	4	Albert Bodiou	E. Leigh Cotton	Greentree Stable	1 1/16 M	1:46.00	
1942	Steel Heels	6	James George	Frank P. Letellier	Junius W. Bell	1 1/16 M	1:46.40	
1943	Aletern	4	Johnny Adams	John H. Skirvin	Alwin C. Ernst	1 1/16 M	1:46.20	
1944	Alquest	4	Johnny Adams	John H. Skirvin	Alwin C. Ernst	1 1/16 M	1:45.60	
1945	Pot O’ Luck	3	Douglas Dodson	Ben A. Jones	Calumet Farm	1 1/16 M	1:46.60	
1946	Bull Play	4	Robert Campbell	Lee Niles	Walter W. Jones	1 1/16 M	1:44.40	
1947	Pot O’ Luck	5	Douglas Dodson	Ben A. Jones	Calumet Farm	1 1/16 M	1:44.00	
1948	Fervent	4	Leroy Pierson	Ben A. Jones	Calumet Farm	1 1/16 M	1:43.80	
1949	Shy Guy	4	Conn McCreary	Jack C. Hodgins	Dixiana Farm	1 1/16 M	1:45.00	
1950	Mount Marcy	5	Kenneth Church	Sylvester E. Veitch	Cornelius Vanderbilt Whitney	1 1/16 M	1:43.80	
1951	Wistful	5	Douglas Dodson	Ben A. Jones	Calumet Farm	1 1/16 M	1:45.00	
1952	Seaward	7	Steve Brooks	Harry Trotsek	Hasty House Farm	1 1/16 M	1:45.00	
1953	Oil Capitol	6	Conn McCreary	Harry Trotsek	Hasty House Farm & Cora Trotsek	1 1/16 M	1:44.00	
1954	Mister Black	5	Johnny Adams	Harry Trotsek	Hasty House Farm	7.0278 F	1:27.00	
1955	Sea O Erin	4	Steve Brooks	Harry Trotsek	Hasty House Farm	7.0278 F	1:27.80	
1956	Timely Tip	5	John L. Rotz	Reid Armstrong	Dr. Alfred Lewis Birch	7.0278 F	1:27.80	
1957	Star Rover	5	John Heckmann	Eddie Anspach	Mrs. Irving Gushen	7.0278 F	1:25.60	
1958	Safe Message	4	Douglas Dodson	Jack C. Hodgins	Dixiana Farm	7.0278 F	1:26.40	
1959	Greek Chief	4	Bill Hartack	Thomas J. Kelly	Michael G. Phipps	7.0278 F	1:26.60	
1960	Fulcrum	5	Steve Brooks	Jack C. Hodgins	Mary V. Fisher	7.0278 F	1:25.40	
1961	Cactus Tom	4	Lawrence Hansman	Thomas H. Stevens Sr.	Natjolee Stable	7.0278 F	1:26.80	
1962	Run for Nurse	5	Steve Brooks	Lee Niles	J. Graham Brown	7.0278 F	1:25.60	
1963	Decidedly	4	James D. Nichols	Horatio Luro	El Peco Ranch	1 1/16 M	1:41.40	
1964	Copy Chief	4	Don Brumfield	S. Bryant Ott	Fourth Estate Stable	1 1/16 M	1:42.80	
1965	Gallant Romeo	4	Kenny Knapp	Willard L. Proctor	J. Graham Brown	1 1/16 M	1:42.80	
1966	Swift Ruler	4	Larry Spraker	Gin L. Collins	Earl Allen	1 1/16 M	1:42.80	
1967	Francis U.	4	Robert Gallimore	Dewey P. Smith	T. Alie & J. E. Grissom	1 1/16 M	1:42.60	
1968	Miracle Hill	4	Robert Gallimore	Dewey P. Smith	T. Alie & J. E. Grissom	1 1/16 M	1:42.60	
1969	Court Recess	4	Eric Guerin	George T. Poole	C. V. Whitney	1 1/16 M	1:44.60	
1970	Gallant Moment	6	Dave Kassen	Jack Long	Circle M Farm (Edward S. Moore)	1 1/16 M	1:42.60	
1971	Great Mystery	4	Phil I. Grimm	Lyle Whiting	B. A. Dario	1 1/16 M	1:41.80	
1972	Knight Counter	4	Don Brumfield	Victor A. Doleski	Robert Huffman	1 1/16 M	1:43.40	
1973	Knight Counter	5	Don Brumfield	Victor A. Doleski	Robert Huffman	1 1/16 M	1:43.00	G3
1974	Knight Counter	6	Earlie Fires	Victor A. Doleski	Robert Huffman	1 1/16 M	1:41.80	G3
1975	Navajo	5	James D. Nichols	James O. Keefer	Joe Stevenson & Ray Stump	1 1/16 M	1:43.80	G3
1976	My Friend Gus	4	Darrel McHargue	Douglas M. Davis Jr.	Patricia Blass	1 1/16 M	1:42.60	G3
1977	Honest Pleasure	4	Craig Perret	LeRoy Jolley	Bertram R. Firestone	1 1/16 M	1:42.40	G3
1978	Prince Majestic	4	Eddie Delahoussaye	Dewey P. Smith	Dorothy Dorsett Brown	1 1/16 M	1:41.80	G3
1979	Kodiak	5	Gerland Gallitano	Harvey L. Vanier	Louis F. Aitken	1 1/8 M	1:49.60	G3
1980	Architect	4	Carl Lauer	Harvey L. Vanier	Stanley Spencer	1 1/8 M	1:48.80	G3
1981	Withholding	4	Bernon Sayler	Ronnie G. Warren	Russell Michael Jr.	1 1/8 M	1:50.20	G3
1982	Withholding	5	Larry Melancon	Ronnie G. Warren	Russell Michael Jr.	1 1/8 M	1:49.60	G3
1983	Aspro	5	Vincent Bracciale Jr.	Grover G. Delp	Mr. & Mrs. James A. Bayard	1 1/8 M	1:49.60	G3
1984	Aspro	6	Don Brumfield	Grover G. Delp	Mrs. & Estate of James A. Bayard	1 1/8 M	1:50.80	G3
1985	Bello	4	Gerland Gallitano	Joseph M. Bollero	Lois Bollero	1 1/8 M	1:48.80	G3
1986	Czar Nijinsky	4	Herb McCauley	Jack Hofher	Jacquelin & Miguel Torrealba	1 1/8 M	1:50.20	G3
1987	Intrusion	5	Sandy Hawley	Lee J. Rossi	Carl J. Maggio	1 1/8 M	1:49.60	G3
1988	Homebuilder	4	Don Brumfield	Woody Stephens	Ryehill Farm (James & Eleanor Ryan)	1 1/8 M	1:51.40	G3
1989	Classic Account	4	Pat Day	Terry L. Mason	Laura Leigh Stables (Leslie E. Lunsford Jr.)	1 1/8 M	1:50.60	G3
1990	Master Speaker	5	Jerry D. Bailey	Virgil W. Raines	Anderson Fowler	1 1/8 M	1:49.00	G3
1991	Sports View	4	Craig Perret	D. Wayne Lukas	Barry Beal & D. Wayne Lukas	1 1/8 M	1:49.67	G3
1992	Profit Key (DH)	5	Shane Sellers	D. Wayne Lukas	Joe Allen & L. Don Mathis	1 1/8 M	1:49.55	G3
1992	Loach (DH)	4	Patrick Valenzuela	Richard J. Lundy	Allen E. Paulson	1 1/8 M	1:49.55	G3
1993	Sunny Sunrise	6	Rick Wilson	Bud Delp	Harry Meyerhoff	1 1/8 M	1:48.80	G3
1994	Pistols and Roses	5	Mike E. Smith	George Gianos	Willis Family Stables Inc.	1 1/8 M	1:51.60	G3
1995	Wildly Joyous	4	Mickey Walls	James E. Baker	Woodlynn Farm	1 1/8 M	1:49.60	G3
1996	Knockadoon	4	Jerry D. Bailey	Anthony Reinstedler	William K. Warren Jr.	1 1/8 M	1:48.80	G3
1997	Louis Quatorze	4	Pat Day	Nick Zito	William J. Condren et al.	1 1/8 M	1:49.60	G3
1998	Storm Broker	4	Robby Albarado	James E. Baker	Woodlynn Farm	1 1/8 M	1:48.20	G3
1999	Jazz Club	4	Pat Day	Neil J. Howard	William S. Farish III/J. Jamail	1 1/8 M	1:48.00	G3
2000	Midway Magistrate	6	Shane Sellers	Rick Hiles	BMH Stable	1 1/8 M	1:49.00	G3
2001	Broken Vow	4	Edgar Prado	H. Graham Motion	Pin Oak Stable	1 1/8 M	1:48.47	G3
2002	Duckhorn	5	Jorge F. Chavez	Patrick B. Byrne	Michael B. Tabor	1 1/8 M	1:50.18	G3
2003	Mineshaft	4	Robby Albarado	Neil J. Howard	William S. Farish III et al.	1 1/8 M	1:48.52	G3
2004	Midway Road	4	Robby Albarado	Neil J. Howard	William S. Farish III	1 1/8 M	1:46.78	G3
2005	Alumni Hall	6	Robby Albarado	Neil J. Howard	William S. Farish III	1 1/8 M	1:51.29	G3
2006	Wanderin Boy	5	Javier Castellano	Nick Zito	Arthur B. Hancock III	1 1/8 M	1:49.18	G3
2007	Jade's Revenge	4	Kent Desormeaux	H. Graham Motion	Bushwood Stable	1 1/8 M	1:49.93	G3
2008	Sterwins	5	Shaun Bridgmohan	Malcolm Pierce	Melnyk Racing	1 1/8 M	1:48.53	G3
2009	Parading	6	Kent Desormeaux	C. R. McGaughey III	Phipps Stable	1 1/8 M	1:47.82	G3
2010	Dubious Miss	6	Calvin Borel	Paul McGee	David P. Holloway	1 1/8 M	1:49.60	G3
2011	Exhi	4	Javier Castellano	Todd Pletcher	Wertheimer et Frere	1 1/8 M	1:48.14	G3
2012	Wise Dan	5	John Velazquez	Charles Lopresti	Morton Fink	1 1/8 M	1:46.63	G3
2013	Successful Dan	6	Joel Rosario	Claude R. McGaughey III	Phipps Stable	1 1/8 M	1:51.14	G3
2014	Frac Daddy	4	Alan Garcia	Kenneth G. McPeek	Magic City Thoroughbreds	1 1/8 M	1:49.61	G3
2015	Protonico	4	Javier Castellano	Todd Pletcher	Sumaya U.S. Stable	1 1/8 M	1:48.79	G3
2016	Eagle	4	Brian Hernandez Jr.	Neil J. Howard	William S. Farish III	1 1/8 M	1:48.57	G3
2017	Watershed	5	Paco Lopez	Kiaran P. McLaughlin	Godolphin Racing, LLC	1 1/8 M	1:50.92	G3
2018	Rated R Superstar	5	Javier Castellano	Kiaran P. McLaughlin	Radar Racing LLC	1 1/8 M	1:49.31	G3
2019	Bourbon Resolution	4	Chris Landeros	Ian R. Wilkes	Bourbon Lane Stable	1 1/8 M	1:50.82	G3
2020	Race not held							
2021	Sliver Dust	5	Adam Beschizza	W. Bret Calhoun	Tom R. Durant	1 1/8 M	1:50.21	G3
2022	Scalding	4	Javier Castellano	Claude R. McGaughey III	Grandview Equine, Cheyenne Stable & LNJ Foxwoods	1 1/8 M	1:50.30	G3
2023	Rattle N Roll	4	Brian Hernandez Jr.	Kenneth G. McPeek	Lucky Seven Stable (Ginny & Leo Mackin)	1 3/16 M	1:56.48	G3
2024	Kingsbarns	4	Luis Saez	Todd A. Pletcher	Spendthrift Farm	1 3/16 M	1:57.74	G3
2025	Tennessee Lamb	4	José Ortiz	George R. Arnold II	Calumet Farm	1 3/16 M	1:59.00	G3
2026	Stars and Stripes	4	Luis Saez	William I. Mott	Frassetto Stables LLC	1 3/16 M	1:58.34	G3
