= Kingsway (horse) =

British-bred Thoroughbred racehorse

- Sire: Fairway
- Grandsire: Phalaris
- Dam: Yenna
- Damsire: Ksar
- Sex: Stallion
- Foaled: 1940
- Country: United Kingdom
- Colour: Bay
- Breeder: Marmaduke Furness, 1st Viscount Furness
- Owner: Alfred Saunders
- Trainer: William Smyth; Joseph Lawson
- Record: 12: 8-1-0 (incomplete)

Major wins
- 2000 Guineas Stakes (1943)

Kingsway (foaled 1940) was a British Thoroughbred racehorse and sire, best known for winning the classic 2000 Guineas in 1943. After being bought for 1,000 guineas in 1941 he showed promise by winning two of his three races as a two-year-old in 1942. Following a change of trainer he won on his debut in 1943 and then recorded an upset win over a strong field in the 2000 Guineas. He was beaten when tried over longer distances in the New Derby and the New St Leger before finishing second to Nasrullah in the Champion Stakes. He won four times as a four-year-old before being retired to stud. He had little success as a breeding stallion in Europe but sired two major winners in the United States.

== Background ==
Kingsway was a big, good-looking bay horse, bred by Marmaduke Furness, 1st Viscount Furness. He was sired by Fairway, an outstanding racehorse who won the St Leger, the Eclipse Stakes and two runnings of the Champion Stakes. At stud his other winners included Blue Peter, Watling Street, Garden Path and Fair Trial. Kingsway's dam Yenna won minor races in France and England and had some influence as a broodmare, being the female-line ancestor of the 1000 Guineas winner Blue Bunting.

Viscount Furness died in October 1940 and all of his horses were offered for sale a year later. Kingsway was bought for 1000 guineas by Alfred Saunders. The colt was sent into training with William Smyth at Epsom.

Kingsway's racing career took place during World War II during which horse racing in Britain was subject to many restrictions. Several major racecourses, including Epsom and Doncaster, were closed for the duration of the conflict, either for safety reasons, or because they were being used by the military. Many important races were rescheduled to new dates and venues, often at short notice, and all five of the Classics were usually run at Newmarket.

== Racing career ==
=== 1942: two-year-old season ===
Kingsway began his racing career as a two-year-old in the summer of 1942, winning easily in minor races at Salisbury and Windsor. On his final appearance he returned to Salisbury and was beaten at odds of 4/9. At the end of the year the colt was removed from Smyth's care and transferred to the stable Joe Lawson at Manton, Wiltshire.

=== 1943: three-year-old season ===
On his first appearance as a three-year-old, Kingsway won the 2000 Guineas Trial Stakes over one mile at Salisbury. He then contested the 135th running of the 2000 Guineas which was run over the July course at Newmarket rather than its traditional home on the Rowley Mile. Another result of wartime disruption was that the race was run on 25 May, almost a month after its usual date. Ridden by Sam Wragg (brother of the more famous Harry Wragg) he started at odds of 18/1 in a nineteen-runner field, with the betting being headed by the Aga Khan's colt Nasrullah. In a closely contested finish, Kingsway prevailed by a short head from Pink Flower, with Way In (also trained by Lawson) a head away in third, Nasrullah in fourth and Straight Deal in sixth.

In the substitute "New Derby" over 1 1/2 miles at the same course on June 19, Kingsway started at odds of 8/1 in a field of twenty-three runners. He finished fifth behind Straight Deal, Umiddad, Nasrullah and Persian Gulf. In September, the "New" St Leger over 1 mile, 6 1/2 furlongs on the July course. Kingsway, whose preparation had been disrupted by injury, finished unplaced behind the filly Herringbone. On his final appearance of the year, Kingsway produced a much better effort when finishing second, beaten half a length by Nasrullah in the Champion Stakes.

=== 1944: four-year-old season ===
Kingsway remained in training as a four-year-old and won four times, taking three races at Ascot Racecourse and one at Windsor. At the end of the season he was retired to stud.

== Assessment ==
In their book A Century of Champions, based on a modified version of the Timeform system, John Randall and Tony Morris rated Kingsway an "inferior" winner of the 2000 Guineas.

== Stud record ==
Kingsway began his stud career in Britain in 1945. He had modest success in his home country, with the best of his offspring being Kingsfold, who finished second to Tulyar in 1952. Two of his sons however, were exported to the United States and had much greater success. Royal Vale (foaled in 1948) showed fair form in Europe but improved when sent across the Atlantic, winning the Miami Beach Handicap, the Dixie Handicap (beating Crafty Admiral), Massachusetts Handicap (beating Count Turf) and the Gallant Fox Handicap (beating One Count). The gelding Stan (foaled in 1950) won Arlington Handicap, the Laurel Turf Cup Handicap and the Hialeah Turf Cup Handicap. He was voted American Champion Male Turf Horse in 1954 and raced successfully up to the age of nine.

In 1955 Kingsway was sold and exported to the United States but made little further impact.

== Pedigree ==
Pedigree of Kingsway (GB), bay stallion, 1940
Sire Fairway (GB) 1925	Phalaris (GB); 1913	Polymelus	Cyllene
Sire Fairway (GB) 1925	Phalaris (GB); 1913	Polymelus	Maid Marian
Sire Fairway (GB) 1925	Phalaris (GB); 1913	Bromus	Sainfoin
Sire Fairway (GB) 1925	Phalaris (GB); 1913	Bromus	Cheery
Sire Fairway (GB) 1925	Scapa Flow (GB); 1914	Chaucer	St Simon
Sire Fairway (GB) 1925	Scapa Flow (GB); 1914	Chaucer	Canterbury Pilgrim
Sire Fairway (GB) 1925	Scapa Flow (GB); 1914	Anchora	Love Wisely
Sire Fairway (GB) 1925	Scapa Flow (GB); 1914	Anchora	Eryholme
Dam Yenna (FR) 1927	Ksar (FR); 1918	Bruleur	Chouberski
Dam Yenna (FR) 1927	Ksar (FR); 1918	Bruleur	Basse Terre
Dam Yenna (FR) 1927	Ksar (FR); 1918	Kizil Kourgan	Omnium
Dam Yenna (FR) 1927	Ksar (FR); 1918	Kizil Kourgan	Kasbah
Dam Yenna (FR) 1927	Yane (FR); 1918	Verwood	Grey Plume
Dam Yenna (FR) 1927	Yane (FR); 1918	Verwood	Kildonan
Dam Yenna (FR) 1927	Yane (FR); 1918	Roselys	Flying Fox
Dam Yenna (FR) 1927	Yane (FR); 1918	Roselys	Roquette (Family: 4-n)
