= Modesty Stakes =

- Class: Grade III
- Location: Churchill Downs; Louisville, Kentucky, United States
- Inaugurated: 1942 (at Washington Park Race Track, Homewood, Illinois)
- Race type: Thoroughbred – Flat racing

Race information
- Distance: 1 1/8 miles
- Surface: Turf
- Track: Left-handed
- Qualification: Fillies & Mares, 4-years-old & up
- Weight: 123 lbs with allowances
- Purse: $250,000 (2022)

The Modesty Stakes is a Grade III American Thoroughbred horse race run annually at Churchill Downs in Louisville, Kentucky.

A Grade III race contested over a distance of 1 1/8 miles on turf, it is open to fillies and mares aged four and older. Run in May on Kentucky Oaks day, the event currently offers a purse of $250,000.

Inaugurated in 1942 at the old Washington Park Race Track as a race for three-year-old fillies, the following year it was made open to both fillies and older mares. Until 1951, it was run as the Modesty Stakes. It was raced on dirt from 1942 through 1955, 1958 through 1965, and again in 1996.

It has been run at various distances:

- 1 mile : 1942, 1944–1946, 1952, 1966
- 3/4 mile (6 furlongs) : 1947–1951, 1953–1954, 1958–1962
- 7/8 mile (7 furlongs) : 1943, 1963–1965
- 1 1/16 miles (8.5 furlongs) : 1955–1957, 1967–1968,1986
- 1 1/8 miles (9 furlongs) : 1987
- 1 3/16 miles (9.5 furlongs) : 1980–1985, 1989–present

The race was hosted by Washington Park Race Track from 1942 through 1945 and from 1968 through 1961. Hawthorne Race Course hosted it in 1985. The race was named in honor of Modesty, a filly owned by Edward Corrigan who beat her male counterparts to win the 1884 inaugural running of the American Derby at Washington Park Race Track under African-American U.S. Racing Hall of Fame jockey, Isaac Burns Murphy.

In 1966, the Modesty Handicap was run in two divisions. There was no race from 1969 through 1979 inclusive, nor in 1988, 1995, 1998 and 1999. In 2022, the event was moved to Churchill Downs after the closure of Arlington Park in Arlington Heights, Illinois.

== Records ==
Speed record: (at current distance of 1 1/8 miles)

- 1:45.51 – She Feels Pretty (2025)

Most wins:

- 2 – Sickle's Image (1951, 1954)
- 2 – Indian Maid (1960, 1961)
- 2 – Gaily Gaily (1989, 1990)

Most wins by an owner:

- 3 – Calumet Farm (1948, 1952, 1959)

Most wins by a jockey:

- 3 – René Douglas (2002, 2003, 2008)
- 3 – Earlie Fires (1982, 1986, 1993)

Most wins by a trainer:

- 3 – Harry Trotsek (1953, 1956, 1958)
- 3 – William I. Mott (1989, 1990, 2005)

== Winners ==
Year	Winner	Age	Jockey	Trainer	Owner	Distance (Miles)	Time
2026	Kathynmarissa	5	José Ortiz	Chad Brown	Michael Dubb and Michael Caruso	1 1/8	1:48.13
2025	She Feels Pretty	4	John R. Velazquez	Cherie DeVaux	Lael Stables (Roy & Gretchen Jackson)	1 1/8	1:45.51
2024	Fast as Flight	6	José Ortiz	Martin Drexler	TEC Racing	1 1/8	1:50.63
2023	Didia	5	Vincent Cheminaud	Ignacio Correas IV	Merriebelle Stables	1 1/8	1:47.46
2022	Bleeker Street	4	Flavien Prat	Chad Brown	Peter Brant	1 1/8	1:50.10
2021	Naval Laughter	4	Sophie Doyle	Christopher Davis	Two Hearts Farm, LLC	1 3/16	1:54.58
	no race 2020 (Note: The 2020 running was cancelled because of the COVID-19 pandemic in the United States)						
2019	Juliet Foxtrot	4	Florent Geroux	Brad H. Cox	Juddmonte Farms	1 3/16	1:54.00
2018	Daddys Lil Darling	4	Brian Hernandez Jr.	Kenneth McPeek	Normandy Farm	1 3/16	1:53.80
2017	Dona Bruja	5	Declan Cannon	Ignacio Correas IV	Dom Felipe	1 3/16	1:55.75
2016	Faufiler	5	Jose Valdivia Jr.	H. Graham Motion	Flaxman Holdings	1 3/16	1:56.12
2015	Walk Close	4	James Graham	Christophe Clement	Highland Yard	1 3/16	1:57.08
2014	I'm Already Sexy	4	Florent Geroux	Wayne M. Catalano	Hit The Board Stables	1 3/16	1:57.56
2013	Ausus	4	James Graham	Daniel C. Peitz	Shadwell Stable	1 3/16	1:53.94
2012	Romacaca	6	Francisco Torres	Danny L. Miller	Frank Carl Calabrese	1 3/16	1:56.67
2011	Fantasia	6	Rajiv Maragh	Jonathan E. Sheppard	Augustin Stable	1 3/16	1:53.80
2010	Tuscan Evening	5	Rafael Bejarano	Jerry Hollendorfer	William de Burgh	1 3/16	1:55.11
2009	Pure Clan	4	Julien Leparoux	Robert E. Holthus	Lewis Lakin	1 3/16	1:55.27
2008	Communique	4	René Douglas	George R. Arnold II	G. Watts Humphrey Jr.	1 3/16	1:58.89
2007	Bridge Game	4	Jeremy Rose	H. Graham Motion	Elizabeth H. Alexander	1 3/16	1:54.62
2006	Chic Dancer	5	Christopher Emigh	Christine K. Janks	S.D. Brilie Ltd. Partnership	1 3/16	1:57.48
2005	Noisettes	5	Cornelio Velásquez	William I. Mott	Haras Santa Maria Aras S.A.	1 3/16	1:57.30
2004	Bedanken	5	Donald Pettinger	Donnie K. Von Hemel	Pin Oak Stable LLC	1 3/16	1:57.00
2003	Owsley	5	René Douglas	Randy Schulhofer	Arthur B. Hancock III	1 3/16	1:55.06
2002	England's Legend	5	René Douglas	Christophe Clement	Edouard de Rothschild	1 3/16	1:55.69
2001	Ioya Two	6	Mark Guidry	Chris M. Block	Team Block	1 3/16	1:55.47
2000	Wade For Me	5	Christopher Emigh	Harvey L. Vanier	Nancy A. Vanier	1 3/16	1:57.06
1999	no race						
1998	no race						
1997	War Thief	5	Shane Sellers	Clinton Stuart	Lane Thoroughbreds	1 3/16	1:57.47
1996	Belle of Cozzene	4	Donald Pettinger	Steve Hobby	B. & J. Smicklas	1 3/16	1:58.24
1995	no race						
1994	Assert Oneself	4	Willie Martinez	Mike Chambers	Three Sisters Stable	1 3/16	1:56.01
1993	Hero's Love	5	Earlie Fires	Daniel J. Vella	Frank Stronach	1 3/16	1:55.31
1992	Tango Charlie	3	Abner G. Sorrows Jr.	Kenneth Hoffman	T. Canonie Jr.	1 3/16	1:58.79
1991	Lady Shirl	4	Shane Sellers	P. Noel Hickey	Irish Acres Farm	1 3/16	1:56.53
1990	Gaily Gaily	7	Mike E. Smith	William I. Mott	Diana M. Firestone	1 3/16	1:55.40
1989	Gaily Gaily	6	Julie Krone	William I. Mott	Diana M. Firestone	1 3/16	1:58.20
1988	no race						
1987	Spruce Luck	6	Don Brumfield	Doug Tribert	C. Kenimer	1 1/8	1:51.60
1986	Zenobia Empress	5	Earlie Fires	Joseph M. Bollero	R. Fortune Jr.	1 3/16	1:44.00
1985	Kapalua Butterfly	4	Darrel McHargue	Harvey L. Vanier	Tom Gentry	1 3/16	1:55.00
1984	Jay's Sue	5	Pat Day	Jerry Calvin	C. P. Blake	1 3/16	2:01.20
1983	Dana Calqui	5	Frank Lovato Jr.	Stephen L. DiMauro	Dogwood Farm	1 3/16	2:01.40
1982	Office Wife	5	Earlie Fires	Willard C. Freeman	Helen Hertz Hexter	1 3/16	1:58.20
1981	Innocent Victim	3	Roger Cox	George J. Getz	Len Friedman & Philip Teinowitz	1 3/16	1:59.00
1980	Allison's Gal	4	Michael Morgan	Steve Morguelan	Adrienne Krumhorn	1 1/16	2:01.20
1969-1979	no race						
1968	Ludham	4	Jacinto Vásquez	Frank I. Wright	Happy Hill Farm	1 1/16	1:44.40
1967	Amerivan	5	Ron Turcotte	Joseph H. Pierce Jr.	William S. Woodside	1 1/16	1:46.20
1966	Margarethen	4	Jimmy Nichols	Charles P. Sanborn	Ernest H. Woods	1	1:37.40
1966	Treasure Chest	3	John Beebe	Joseph H. Pierce Jr.	David Shaer	1	1:37.20
1965	Isaduchess	4	Kenny Knapp	Edward I. Kelly Sr.	Brookfield Farm	7/8	1:23.20
1964	Alecee	5	Walter Blum	John J. Gavin Jr.	Forest H. Lindsay	7/8	1:23.00
1963	Hushaby	4	Bill Hartack	Chuck R. Werstler	Mary V. Fisher	7/8	1:23.00
1962	Goldflower	4	Herberto Hinojosa	Chuck R. Werstler	Mary V. Fisher	3/4	1:10.40
1961	Indian Maid	5	Johnny Sellers	Howard C. Hoffman	Mary D. Keim	3/4	1:09.80
1960	Indian Maid	4	John L. Rotz	Elmer Heubeck Jr.	Mary D. Keim	3/4	1:09.60
1959	A. Glitter	4	Chris Rogers	Horace A. Jones	Calumet Farm	3/4	1:10.00
1958	Melody Mine	3	Richard L. Barnett	Harry Trotsek	Hasty House Farm (Allie E. & Billie Reuben)	3/4	1:10.80
1957	Grecian Ayr	4	Larry Gilligan	Jimmy Wallace	Agoura Stock Farm	1 1/16	1:43.60
1956	Queen Hopeful	5	John Adams	Harry Trotsek	Hasty House Farm	1 1/16	1:44.80
1955	Insouciant	3	Billie Fisk	Howard Wells	Dr. Eslie Asbury	1 1/16	1:43.40
1954	Sickle's Image	6	Douglas Dodson	Clarence Hartwick	Clarence Hartwick	3/4	1:10.00
1953	Bella Figura	4	Don Wagner	Harry Trotsek	Brownell Combs	3/4	1:10.20
1952	Real Delight	3	Eddie Arcaro	Ben A. Jones	Calumet Farm	3/4	1:35.60
1951	Sickle's Image	3	Charles Swain	Clarence Hartwick	Clarence Hartwick	3/4	1:10.80
1950	Myrtle Charm	4	Glen Lasswell	Tom Smith	Maine Chance Farm	3/4	1:10.00
1949	No Strings	3	Fred Smith	Howard C. Hoffman	Mrs. John Marsch	3/4	1:10.00
1948	Bewitch	3	Hedley Woodhouse	Horace A. Jones	Calumet Farm	3/4	1:10.20
1947	Sea Snack	4	Manuel N. Gonzalez	James A. Healey	Christiana Stables	3/4	1:11.60
1946	Athene	3	Warren Mehrtens	Max Hirsch	Edward Lasker	3/4	1:36.00
1945	War Date	3	John Adams	Tom Smith	Maine Chance Farm	1	1:38.80
1944	Gold Princess	5	Jesse Higley	David V. McClure	David V. McClure	1	1:39.40
1943	Burgoo Maid	3	George Burns	Homer C. Pardue	Ruth Sidell	7/8	1:27.40
1942	Lotopoise	3	Steve Brooks	Kenneth Osborne	Hal Price Headley	1	1:37.80
