= Stan (horse) =

British-bred Thoroughbred racehorse

- Sire: Kingsway
- Grandsire: Fairway
- Dam: Final Sweep
- Damsire: Brumeux
- Sex: Gelding
- Foaled: 1950
- Country: Great Britain
- Colour: Brown
- Owner: Hasty House Farm
- Trainer: Harry Trotsek
- Record: 40: 18-2-4
- Earnings: US$241,880 & £2,196

Major wins
- Grassland Handicap (1953); Arlington Handicap (1950); Meadowland Handicap (1954); Laurel Turf Cup Handicap (1954); Hialeah Turf Cup Handicap (1955)

Awards
- American Champion Male Turf Horse (1954)

Stan (foaled in 1950 in England) was a Thoroughbred racehorse who raced in England and in the United States where he was the 1954 American Champion Male Turf Horse. Racing at age two in 1952, he won six of his eight starts in England before being sold to an American buyer who in turn subsequently sold him for US$29,050 to Allie Reuben, owner of Hasty House Farm.
