= Sam Boulmetis Sr. =

American jockey (1927–2021)

Personal information
- Born: February 17, 1927 Baltimore, Maryland, United States
- Died: May 30, 2021 (aged 94)
- Occupation: Jockey

Horse racing career
- Sport: Horse racing
- Career wins: 2,783

Major racing wins
- Westchester Handicap (1950); Brooklyn Handicap (1951); Monmouth Handicap (1951, 1955, 1961); Oceanport Stakes (1951, 1955, 1959, 1962); Juvenile Stakes (1952, 1959); Miss Woodford Stakes (1952, 1960, 1964); Rowe Memorial Handicap (1952); William Penn Stakes (1952, 1956); Laurel Futurity (1953); American Derby (1954); Arlington Classic (1954, 1964); Florida Breeders' Stakes (1954); Pimlico Special (1954, 1958); Jersey Derby (1955); Massachusetts Handicap (1955); Molly Pitcher Handicap (1955); Salvator Mile Handicap (1955); Suburban Handicap (1955); Alcibiades Stakes (1956); United Nations Handicap (1956); Laurel Turf Cup (1957); Palm Beach Handicap (1957, 1958); Royal Palm Handicap (1957); Washington, D.C. International Stakes (1957); Wilson Handicap (1957); Widener Handicap (1958); Dwyer Stakes (1959); Great American Stakes (1959); New Jersey Futurity (1959); National Stallion Stakes (1960); Red Smith Handicap (1960, 1963); Schuylerville Stakes (1960); Canadian International Stakes (1961); Niagara Handicap (1962); Astarita Stakes (1963); Frizette Stakes (1963); Arlington Matron Handicap (1964); Beldame Stakes (1964); Maskette Handicap (1964, 1965); Test Stakes (1965); John B. Campbell Handicap (1966)

Racing awards
- Leading jockey at Monmouth Park Racetrack (1949, 1953, 1955, 1956)

Honours
- National Museum of Racing and Hall of Fame (1973)

Significant horses
- Arise, Bally Ache, Career Boy, Dedicate, Fisherman, Helioscope, Mahan, Misty Morn, Palestinian, Tosmah
- Updated on May 14, 2010

Samuel Anthony Boulmetis Sr. (February 17, 1927 - May 30, 2021) was an American thoroughbred horse racing jockey who was inducted into the National Museum of Racing and Hall of Fame in 1973. The Hall's induction biography says that "His peers described him as an honest and intelligent rider, qualities he later demonstrated as a racing official and state steward for New Jersey."

Born in Baltimore, the son of a Greek tailor, Sam Boulmetis began his involvement in the horse racing industry as a stable hand at Laurel Park Racecourse in Laurel, Maryland. He began riding professionally in late 1948 and earned his first win in 1949 at Garden State Park then went on to win that year's riding championship at Monmouth Park Racetrack. He repeated as the leading jockey at Monmouth Park in 1953, 1955, and 1956.

The winner of numerous important races, Boulmetis won the Arlington Classic twice and the prestigious Washington, D.C. International Stakes and Canadian International Stakes, forerunners to the Breeders' Cup races which drew the best horses to the United States and Canada from around the world. For owner Cornelius Vanderbilt Whitney, he rode Fisherman in the 1956 Prix de l'Arc de Triomphe at Longchamp Racecourse in Paris, France. Among the other notable horses he rode was Hall of Fame inductee Tosmah with whom he won seven stakes races. In the 1955 Massachusetts Handicap, Boulmetis rode Helioscope to a track record time of 2:01 for 1¼ miles on dirt, unbroken as of 2008.

Throughout his career Sam Boulmetis raced primarily at tracks on the East Coast of the United States. He retired from riding after the 1966 season and in 1969 was appointed a steward at Monmouth Park Racetrack in Oceanport, New Jersey. He retired in 2004 from his duties as a racing official and state steward for the State of New Jersey.

His son, Sam Boulmetis Jr., followed in his footsteps, becoming a professional jockey in 1973 and riding until 1981 when a racing accident left him paralyzed from the waist down. Sam Jr. is now a steward at Philadelphia Park Racetrack.

Sam Boulmetis' nephew is jockey Tony Black.

Preceded by Eddie Arcaro	Jockeys' Guild President; 1962-1967	Succeeded by William Boland
