= Stars and Stripes Stakes =

American horse race (1929–2018)

- Class: Discontinued Grade 3 stakes
- Location: Arlington Park; Arlington Heights, Illinois, United States
- Inaugurated: 1929
- Race type: Thoroughbred – Flat racing
- Website: Arlington Park

Race information
- Distance: 1 1/2 miles
- Surface: Turf
- Track: Left-handed
- Qualification: Three-year-olds & up
- Purse: $100,000 (2018)

The Stars and Stripes Stakes was a Grade III horse race in the United States for Thoroughbreds aged three years and up. It was last raced over a distance of 12 furlongs (1½ miles) on the turf at Arlington Park near Chicago as a lead up race to the Arlington Million and Breeders' Cup Turf.

Inaugurated in 1929, it was raced on dirt through 1949 and again in 1973 and 1974. It was hosted by Washington Park Racetrack from 1943 to 1945 and in 1958 and 1959. It was run for three-year-olds only in 1958.

Until the advent of the Breeders' Cup races, the race was known as the Stars and Stripes Handicap and was an important part of the annual racing calendar. It drew the top horses from across the United States and has been won by a number of U.S. Hall of Fame horses as well as U.S. Triple Crown champion Citation.

Key to Content finished first in 1981 but was disqualified and placed fourth. As a result, Rossi Gold and Ben Fab, who finished in a dead heat for second, were moved up to a dead heat for first.

In 2019 the Stars and Stripes Stakes was dropped from the Arlington Park schedule.

== Records ==
Speed record on turf:

- 1:42 1/5 @ 1 1/16 miles: Drumalis (1985)
- 1:47 1/5 @ 1 1/8 miles: Round Table (1959)
- 1:55.00 @ 1 3/16 miles: Plate Dancer (1992)
- 2:27.39 @ 1 1/2 miles: Dark Cove (2013)

Most wins:

- 3 – Rossi Gold (1981, 1982, 1983)

Most wins by a jockey:

- 5 – Pat Day (1981, 1982, 1983, 1985, 1989)

Most wins by a trainer:

- 5 – Harry Trotsek (1950, 1962, 1972, 1974, 1976)

Most wins by an owner:

- 4 – Calumet Farm (Warren Wright) (1947, 1948, 1949, 1955)
- 4 – Hasty House Farm (1950, 1962, 1972, 1974)

== Winners ==
Year	Winner	Age	Jockey	Trainer	Owner	Dist. (Miles)	Time	Grade
2018	Catcho En Die	6	Jose Valdivia Jr.	Naipaul Chatterpaul	Naipaul Chatterpaul & Sotirios Sakatis	1 1/2 m	2:27.51	G3
2017	Keystoneforvictory	4	Julien Leparoux	Michael J. Maker	Kenneth & Sarah Ramsey	1 1/2 m	2:29.89	G3
2016	Greengrassofwyoming	6	Shaun Bridgmohan	Michael J. Maker	Michael Hui	1 1/2 m	2:27.74	G3
2015	The Pizza Man	6	Florent Geroux	Roger Brueggemann	Midwest Thoroughbreds (Richard & Karen Papiese)	1 1/2 m	2:34.13	G3
2014	The Pizza Man	5	Florent Geroux	Roger Brueggemann	Midwest Thoroughbreds (Richard & Karen Papiese)	1 1/2 m	2:33.67	G3
2013	Dark Cove	6	Rosie Napravnik	Michael J. Maker	Kenneth & Sarah Ramsey	1 1/2 m	2:27.39	G3
2012	Ioya Bigtime	5	Jeffrey Sanchez	Chris M. Block	Team Block	1 1/2 m	2:28.44	G3
2011	Free Fighter	6	Tim Thornton	Michael Reavis	Frank Mancari	1 1/2 m	2:31.98	G3
2010	Memorial Maniac	5	James Graham	Larry Demeritte	Butterfly Stable (Larry Slavin, et al.)	1 5/8 m	2:44.29	G3
2009	Free Fighter	4	James Graham	Chris M. Block	Team Block & Thomas Fedro Sr.	1 1/2 m	2:28.31	G3
2008	Silverfoot	8	René Douglas	Dallas Stewart	Chrysalis Stables LLC	1 1/2 m	2:30.40	G3
2007	Always First	6	Robby Albarado	Thomas H. Voss	Merriefield Farm & Charles Noell	1 1/2 m	2:31.74	G3
2006	Major Rhythm	7	Earlie Fires	Ed J. Beam	James Messineo	1 1/2 m	2:29.93	G3
2005	Revved Up	7	Brice Blanc	Christophe Clement	Live Oak Racing (Charlotte Weber)	1 1/2 m	2:28.29	G3
2004	Ballingarry	5	René Douglas	Laura de Seroux	Sidney L. Port Trust et al.	1 1/2 m	2:36.30	G3
2003	Ballingarry	4	René Douglas	Laura de Seroux	Sidney L. Port Trust et al.	1 1/2 m	2:28.30	G3
2002	Cetewayo	8	René Douglas	Michael Dickinson	John A. Chandler	1 1/2 m	2:27.50	G3
2001	Falcon Flight	5	René Douglas	Donald J. Burke II	Gary A. Tanaka	1 1/2 m	2:27.86	G3
2000	Williams News	5	Robby Albarado	Tom Amoss	On Target Racing Stable	1 1/2 m	2:31.22	G3
1998	– 1999	Race not held						
1997	Lakeshore Road	4	Calvin Borel	Tom Amoss	Ralph Wilson	1 1/2 m	2:29.57	G3
1996	Vladivostok	6	Craig Perret	Neil J. Howard	Bayard Sharp	1 1/2 m	2:30.23	G3
1995	Snake Eyes	5	Robby Albarado	Steven L. Morguelan	Marco Bommarito & Melvin Isenstein	1 3/16 m	1:56.46	G3
1994	Marastani	4	Aaron Gryder	Tom Amoss	Temple Webber Jr.	1 3/16 m	1:54.64	G3
1993	Little Bro Lantis	5	Curt Bourque	Merrill R. Scherer	Robert Hall & William McCollough	1 3/16 m	1:56.92	G3
1992	Plate Dancer	7	Earlie Fires	P. Noel Hickey	Irish Acres Farm	1 3/16 m	1:55.00	G3
1991	Blair's Cove	6	Garrett Gomez	P. Noel Hickey	Irish Acres Farm	1 3/16 m	1:55.95	G3
1990	Mister Sicy	4	Corey Black	Nicolas Clément	Mr. & Mrs. Michael Cahan	1 3/16 m	1:54.40	G3
1989	Salem Drive	7	Pat Day	Thomas J. Skiffington Jr.	Virginia Kraft Payson	1 3/16 m	1:55.20	G2
1988	Race not held							
1987	Sharood	4	Fernando Toro	John Gosden	Sheikh Mohammed	1 3/16 m	1:56.20	G2
1986	Explosive Darling	4	Earlie Fires	Louis M. Goldfine	Richard L. Duchossois	1 1/8 m	1:48.40	G2
1985	Drumalis	5	Pat Day	Darrell Vienna	William Gumpert & Robert Kennedy	1 1/16 m	1:42.20	G2
1984	Tough Mickey	4	Jean-Luc Samyn	Philip G. Johnson	Michelina Napolitano	1 1/16 m	1:42.40	G2
1983	Rossi Gold	7	Pat Day	Raymond S. Lawrence Jr.	Leslie Combs II	1 1/16 m	1:48.80	G2
1982	Rossi Gold	6	Pat Day	Raymond S. Lawrence Jr.	Leslie Combs II	1 1/16 m	1:46.00	G2
1981	Rossi Gold (DH)	5	Pat Day	Raymond S. Lawrence Jr.	Leslie Combs II	1 1/16 m	1:43.80	G2
1981	Ben Fab (DH)	4	Gary Stahlbaum	Jacques Dumas	Fernand Audet & René Benoit			
1980	Told	4	Jean-Luc Samyn	Philip G. Johnson	Meadowhill	1 1/16 m	1:43.00	G2
1979	Overskate	4	Robin Plats	Gil Rowntree	Jack H. Stafford	1 1/16 m	1:44.00	G2
1978	Old Frankfort	6	Ron Turcotte	David K. Feldman	David K. Feldman & Al Wittlin	1 1/8 m	1:50.20	G2
1977	Quick Card	4	Mickey Solomone	Thomas J. Kelly	John M. Schiff	1 1/16 m	1:43.00	G2
1976	Passionate Pirate	5	Heriberto Arroyo	Harry Trotsek	Dr. Robert A. Franklyn	1 1/16 m	1:43.00	G2
1975	Buffalo Lark	5	Larry Snyder	Joseph M. Bollero	Rogers Red Top Farm (Walter F. Mullady)	1 1/16 m	1:43.00	G2
1974	Zografos	6	William Gavidia	Harry Trotsek	Hasty House Farm	1 1/8 m	1:50.80	G2
1973	Triumphant	4	Anthony F. Rini	Joseph M. Bollero	Marion O. Reineman	1 m	1:34.80	G2
1972	Unanime	5	William Gavidia	Harry Trotsek	Hasty House Farm	1 1/8 m	1:51.20	
1971	Knight in Armor	4	Mike Venezia	H. Allen Jerkens	Hobeau Farm	1 1/8 m	1:51.20	
1970	Mr. Leader	4	Jorge Tejeira	MacKenzie Miller	Cragwood Stables	1 1/8 m	1:47.40	
1969	Hawaii	5	Manuel Ycaza	MacKenzie Miller	Cragwood Stables	1 1/8 m	1:49.80	
1968-1	Out The Window	4	Henry M. Moreno	Thomas W. Kelley	James R. Chapman	1 1/8 m	1:50.40	
1968-2	Fort Marcy	4	Carlos H. Marquez	J. Elliott Burch	Rokeby Stables	1 1/8 m	1:50.60	
1967	Climax II	6	Laffit Pincay Jr.	Harold Tinker	August Muckler	1 1/8 m	1:49.60	
1966	1966 Climax II	5	Bill Hartack	Harold Tinker	August Muckler	1 1/8 m	1:50.20	
1965	Marlin Bay	5	Herb Hinojosa	John Russell	Verna Lea Farm (Gene & Verna Lee Goff)	1 1/8 m	1:49.40	
1964	Spanish Fort	4	Don Brumfield	Steve Ippolito	Jacnot Stable (O. T. & Jack R. Hogan)	1 1/8 m	1:48.60	
1963	Hard Rock Man	4	Walter Blum	Robert Cramer	R. Morton Johnson	1 1/8 m	1:48.20	
1962	Porvenir II	8	Avelino Gomez	Harry Trotsek	Hasty House Farm	1 1/8 m	1:51.20	
1961	Oink	4	Johnny Sellers	Steve Ippolito	Jacnot Stable (O. T. & Jack R. Hogan)	1 1/8 m	1:50.60	
1960	Dunce	4	Braulio Baeza	Moody Jolley	Claiborne Farm	1 1/8 m	1:57.60	
1959	Round Table	5	Bill Shoemaker	William Molter	Kerr Stable	1 1/8 m	1:47.20	
1958	Terra Firma	3	Lois C. Cook	R. Douglas Prewitt	H. Edsall Olson & R. Douglas Prewitt	1 1/8 m	1:50.60	
1957	Manasas	4	Charles E. Burr	John Zitnik	John Zitnik	1 1/8 m	1:50.60	
1956	Sir Tribal	5	Bill Hartack	Steve Ippolito	Charles Fritz	1 1/8 m	1:49.00	
1955	Mark-Ye-Well	6	David Erb	Horace A. Jones	Calumet Farm	1 1/8 m	1:48.40	
1954	Sir Mango	4	David Erb	Charles E. Eads	Harry N. Eads	1 1/8 m	1:49.40	
1953	Abbe Sting	5	Ronald Baldwin	John P. Keezek	Mrs. John P. Keezek	1 1/8 m	1:48.40	
1952	Royal Mustang	4	Paul J. Bailey	Joseph "Whitey" Jansen	Sam E. Wilson Jr.	1 1/8 m	1:49.20	
1951	Royal Governor	7	Eddie Arcaro	James E. Ryan	Esther D. du Pont Weir	1 1/8 m	1:49.20	
1950	Inseparable	5	Kenneth Church	Harry Trotsek	Hasty House Farm	1 1/8 m	1:52.20	
1949	Coaltown	4	Steve Brooks	Horace A. Jones	Calumet Farm	1 1/8 m	1:48.40	
1948	Citation	3	Eddie Arcaro	Horace A. Jones	Calumet Farm	1 1/8 m	1:49.20	
1947	Armed	6	Douglas Dodson	Horace A. Jones	Calumet Farm	1 1/8 m	1:49.20	
1946	Witch Sir	4	Robert Campbell	Leonard J. Wilson	Louis Schlosser	1 1/8 m	1:49.40	
1945	Devalue	7	Steve Brooks	Ralph Salvino	Happy Hour Farm	1 1/8 m	1:51.60	
1944	Georgie Drum	5	George Woolf	Allen B. Drumheller	Allen B. Drumheller	1 1/8 m	1:49.80	
1943	Rounders	4	Ferrill Zufelt	Frank Catrone	Valdina Farms	1 1/8 m	1:53.60	
1942	Take Wing	4	Fred A. Smith	Clyde Troutt	Clyde Troutt	1 1/8 m	1:58.60	
1941	Steel Heels	5	Albert Snider	Frank Letllier	Junius Bell	1 1/8 m	1:49.80	
1940	Advocator	6	John E. Oros	Philip F. Dwyer	Charles S. Howard	1 1/8 m	1:50.00	
1939	Count d'or	4	Johnny Longden	Don Cameron	Fannie Hertz	1 1/8 m	1:50.80	
1938	War Minstrel	4	Ira Hanford	Willie Booth	Jean Denemark	1 1/8 m	1:54.20	
1937	Corinto	5	Jack Westrope	Frank Gilpin	Jean Denemark	1 1/8 m	1:50.00	
1936	Stand Pat	5	Charles McTague	Frank Gilpin	Edward F. Seagram	1 1/8 m	1:49.60	
1935	Discovery	4	John Bejshak	Joseph H. Stotler	Alfred G. Vanderbilt Jr.	1 1/8 m	1:50.80	
1934	Indian Runner	5	Allen Tipton	George W. Ogle	D. A. Wood	1 1/8 m	1:49.80	
1933	Indian Runner	4	Allen Tipton	George W. Ogle	D. A. Wood	1 1/8 m	1:51.40	
1932	Equipoise	4	Raymond Workman	Fred Hopkins	C. V. Whitney	1 1/8 m	1:54.80	
1931	Plucky Play	4	Delmar Trivett	Elwood L. Fitzgerald	Northway Stable (Norman W. Church)	1 1/8 m	1:50.80	
1930	Blue Larkspur	4	James W. Smith	Herbert J. Thompson	Edward R. Bradley	1 1/8 m	1:49.40	
1929	Dowagiac	4	Antony Pascuma	C. F. Cherry	Wild Rose Farm (Valentine "Val" Crane)	1 1/8 m	1:50.60	
