= Arlington Stakes =

- Class: Grade III
- Location: Churchill Downs; Louisville, Kentucky, United States
- Inaugurated: 1929 (as Arlington Handicap at Arlington Park)
- Race type: Thoroughbred – Flat racing
- Website: Arlington Park

Race information
- Distance: 1 1/16 miles
- Surface: Turf
- Track: Left-handed
- Qualification: Four-year-olds & older
- Weight: 123 lbs with allowances
- Purse: 200,000

The Arlington Stakes is a Grade III American Thoroughbred horse race for horses aged four years old over a distance of one and one-sixteenth miles on the turf held annually in late May or early June at Churchill Downs in Louisville, Kentucky. The event currently carries a purse of $200,000.

It currently offers a purse of $200,000 and served as a final local prep race for the Arlington Million.

The race was hosted by the now defunct Washington Park Race Track in 1943, 1944 and 1945, and by the Hawthorne Race Course in 1985.

The Arlington Handicap was run on dirt in 1929–1940, 1942–1953, 1963, 1965–1972, and in 1975. There was no race held in 1940, 1969, 1970, 1971, 1988, 1998, or 1999.

In 2022, the event was moved to Churchill Downs after the closure of Arlington Park in Arlington Heights, Illinois and run over the shorter distance of 1 1/16 miles.

Distances:

- 7/8 mile – 1968
- 1 mile – 1963, 1966–1967
- 1 1/16 miles – 2022
- 1 1/8 miles – 1929, 1952, 1965
- 1 1/4 miles – 1930–1939, 1942–1951, 1984 to 2014
- 1 3/16 miles – 1941, 1953–1962, 1964, 1973–1976, 2015–2021
- 1 1/2 miles – 1972, 1977–1983

== Records ==
Speed record:

1:40.08 - Lagynos (2026) (at 1 1/16 miles on Churchill Downs turf)

- 2:00.62 – Sky Classic (1992) (at 1 1/4 miles on Arlington Park turf)
- In 1985, Pass the Line ran 1 1/4 miles on turf in 2:00 2/5 at Hawthorne Race Course.
- 1:53.16- Bandua (2019) (at 1 3/16 mile distance)

Most wins:

- 3 – Rahystrada (2010, 2012, 2013)

Most wins by an owner:

- 4 – Calumet Farm (1936, 1947, 1949, 1950)

Most wins by a jockey:

- 4 – Bill Shoemaker (1958, 1959, 1965, 1983)

Most wins by a trainer:

- 4 – Robert J. Frankel (1991, 1994, 1996, 2000)

== Winners ==
Year	Winner	Age	Jockey	Trainer	Owner	Distance	Time
2026	Lagynos	5	Jose L. Ortiz	Steven M. Asmussen	HRH Prince Sultan Bin Mishal Al Saud	1 1/16 Miles	1:40.08
2025	Mercante	5	Joseph D. Ramos	Brian Knippenberg	Carl F. Pollard	1 1/16 Miles	1:40.69
2024	Ottoman Fleet (GB)	5	Flavien Prat	Charles Appleby	Godolphin LLC	1 1/16 Miles	1:41.45
2023	Set Piece (GB)	7	Florent Geroux	Brad H. Cox	Juddmonte	1 1/16 Miles	1:42.42
2022	Admission Office	7	John R. Velazquez	Brian A. Lynch	Amerman Racing LLC	1 1/16 Miles	1:43.52
2021	Bizzee Channel	5	Jareth Loveberry	Larry Rivelli	Patricia's Hope LLC	1 3/16 Miles	1:55.08
2020	Not run due to the COVID-19 pandemic						
2019	Bandua	4	Adam Beschizza	Jack Sisterson	Calumet Farm	1 3/16 Miles	1:53.16
2018	Divisidero	6	Jevian Toledo	Kelly Rubley	Gunpowder Farms, LLC & Brereton C. Jones	1 3/16 Miles	1:54.03
2017	Ghost Hunter	7	Edwin Gonzalez	Jamie Ness	Triple K Stables	1 3/16 Miles	1:55.86
2016	Kasaqui (ARG)	6	Robby Albarado	Ignacio Correas IV	Wimborne Farm	1 3/16 Miles	1:55.62
2015	Quiet Force	5	Julien Leparoux	Michael Maker	Charles Kevin Warner	1 3/16 Miles	1:56.50
2014	Finnegans Wake	5	Victor Espinoza	Dale L. Romans	Donegal Racing	1 1/4 Miles	2:05.42
2013	Rahystrada	9	Rosie Napravnik	Byron G. Hughes	Robert E. Courtney Jr.	1 1/4 Miles	2:01.66
2012	Rahystrada	8	Joel Rosario	Byron G. Hughes	Robert E. Courtney Jr.	1 1/4 Miles	2:01.84
2011	Tajaaweed	6	James Graham	Daniel Peitz	Shadwell Stable	1 1/4 Miles	2:01.83
2010	Rahystrada	6	Inez Karlsson	Byron G. Hughes	Robert E. Courtney Jr.	1 1/4 Miles	2:01.26
2009	Just As Well	6	E. T. Baird	Jonathan E. Sheppard	Jonathan E. Sheppard	1 1/4 Miles	2:02.84
2008	Stream Cat	5	James Graham	Rusty Arnold	Fab Oak Stable / Hurley / Goldthorpe	1 1/4 Miles	2:04.83
2007	Cosmonaut	5	Julien Leparoux	Patrick Biancone	Flying Zee Stable	1 1/4 Miles	2:01.32
2006	Cosmonaut	4	Julien Leparoux	Patrick Biancone	Flying Zee Stable	1 1/4 Miles	2:03.10
2005	Cool Conductor	4	Cornelio Velásquez	Ralph Nicks	David E. Garner	1 1/4 Miles	2.02.26
2004	Senor Swinger	4	Brice Blanc	Bob Baffert	Robert & Beverly Lewis	1 1/4 Miles	2:03.38
2003	Honor In War	4	David Flores	Paul McGee	Turn Stable LLC	1 1/4 Miles	2:02.71
2002	Falcon Flight	6	René Douglas	Donald Burke Jr.	Gary A. Tanaka	1 1/4 Miles	2:03.13
2001	Make No Mistake	6	Robby Albarado	Burke Kessinger Jr.	Bruce Barton / Alvin D. Haynes	1 1/4 Miles	2:02.53
2000	Northern Quest	5	Robby Albarado	Robert J. Frankel	Plus U Stables	1 1/4 Miles	2:02.13
	No race 1998–1999						
1997	Wild Event	4	Mark Guidry	Lou M. Goldfine	Arthur I. Appleton	1 1/4 Miles	2:01.52
1996	Torch Rouge	5	Mark Guidry	Robert J. Frankel	Edmund A. Gann	1 1/4 Miles	2:03.32
1995	Manilaman	4	Randy Romero	Wallace Howard	Herb & Precious Luster	1 1/4 Miles	2:02.82
1994	Fanmore	6	Pat Day	Robert J. Frankel	Juddmonte Farms	1 1/4 Miles	2:01.72
1993	Evanescent	6	Aaron Gryder	Lou M. Goldfine	Mark Levy	1 1/4 Miles	2:00.93
1992	Sky Classic	5	Pat Day	James E. Day	Sam-Son Farms	1 1/4 Miles	2:00.62
1991	Filago	4	Pat Valenzuela	Robert J. Frankel	Edmund A. Gann	1 1/4 Miles	2:01.40
1990	Pleasant Variety	6	Earlie Fires	Jerry M. Fanning	M. B. & E. Alpert	1 1/4 Miles	2:04.00
1989	Unknown Quantity	4	Jorge Velásquez	W. Hastings-Bass	Queen Elizabeth II	1 1/4 Miles	2:11.20
	No race 1988						
1987	Ifrad	5	Gary Baze	Charles Whittingham	Sidney L. Port & C. E. Whittingham	1 1/4 Miles	2:12.20
1986	Mourjane	6	José A. Santos	Tom Skiffington Jr.	Fernwood Stable	1 1/4 Miles	2:01.40
1985	Pass The Line	4	Juvenal Diaz	Carl J. Domino	Stanley Ersoff	1 1/4 Miles	2:00.40
1984	Who's For Dinner	5	Mike Venezia	Jan H. Nerud	Tartan Stable	1 1/4 Miles	2:04.00
1983	Palikaraki	5	Bill Shoemaker	Charles Whittingham	Sidney L. Port	1 1/2 Miles	2:35.40
1982	Flying Target	5	Roger Cox	Chuck Werstler	Dixiana Stable	1 1/2 Miles	2:32.20
1981	Spruce Needles	4	Julio Espinoza	Smiley Adams	Golden Chance Farm	1 1/2 Miles	2:35.00
1980	Yvonand	4	Don Combs	Eric Beitia	Double Eagle Stable	1 1/2 Miles	2:31.40
1979	Bowl Game	5	Jorge Velásquez	John M. Gaver Jr.	Greentree Stable	1 1/2 Miles	2:32.20
1978	Romeo	5	Earlie Fires	Joe Bollero	J. E. Johnson	1 1/2 Miles	2:32.00
1977	Cunning Trick	4	Bryan Fann	John W. Russell	Ogden Phipps	1 3/16 Miles	2:33.80
1976	Victorian Prince	6	Robin Platts	Michael Whittingham	Grovetree Stable	1 3/16 Miles	1:58.20
1975	Royal Glint	5	Jorge Tejeira	Gordon R. Potter	Dan Lasater	1 3/16 Miles	1:55.80
1974	Buffalo Lark	4	Larry Snyder	Joe Bollero	Rogers Red Top Farm	1 3/16 Miles	1:54.40
1973	Dubassoff	4	Jacinto Vásquez	Thomas J. Kelly	John M. Schiff	1 3/16 Miles	1:58.60
1972	Cloudy Dawn	3	Bill Hartack	Frank Whiteley Jr.	Pen-Y-Bryn Farm	1 1/2 miles	2:31.00
	No race 1969–1971						
1968	Tumiga	4	Walter Blum	Roger Laurin	George E. Robb	7/8 Miles	1:20.40
1967	Stupendos	4	Laffit Pincay Jr.	Edward A. Neloy	Wheatley Stable	1 Mile	1:35.00
1966	Tronado	6	Balsamino Moreira	Arnold N. Winick	Herff-Lacroix	1 Mile	1:35.80
1965	Chieftain	4	Bill Shoemaker	Frank Whiteley Jr.	Powhatan Stable	1 1/8 Miles	1:49.40
1964	Master Dennis	4	Don Brumfield	Burley Parke	Harbor View Farm	1 3/16 Miles	1:55.80
1963	Bounding Main	4	Jimmy Nichols	Pete Divito	Lindsay C. Howard	1 Mile	1:36.40
1962	El Bandito	5	Ray Broussard	Joseph H. Pierce Jr.	Edward A. Seltzer	1 3/16 Miles	1:58.60
1961	Tudorich	4	Sandino Hernandez	Paul L. Kelley	Spring Hill Farm	1 3/16 Miles	1:57.80
1960	One-Eyed King	6	Manuel Ycaza	Woody Stephens	Cain Hoy Stable	1 3/16 Miles	1:58.60
1959	Round Table	5	Bill Shoemaker	William Molter	Kerr Stable	1 3/16 Miles	1:53.40
1958	Round Table	4	Bill Shoemaker	William Molter	Kerr Stable	1 3/16 Miles	1:54.40
1957	Manassas	4	Douglas Dodson	John Zitnik	John Zitnik	1 3/16 Miles	1:55.40
1956	Mister Gus	5	Ismael Valenzuela	Charles Whittingham	Llangollen Farm Stable	1 3/16 Miles	1:54.60
1955	Platan	5	John H. Adams	Harry Trotsek	Hasty House Farm	1 3/16 Miles	1:54.40
1954	Stan	4	Eldon Nelson	Harry Trotsek	Hasty House Farm	1 3/16 Miles	1:57.00
1953	Oil Capitol	6	Conn McCreary	Harry Trotsek	Hasty House Farm / Harry Trotsek	1 3/16 Miles	2:03.40
1952	To Market	4	William Boland	Max Hirsch	King Ranch	1 1/8 Miles	1:52.20
1951	Cochise	5	Ovie Scurlock	Virgil W. Raines	Brandywine Stable	1 1/4 Miles	2:03.40
1950	Ponder	4	Steve Brooks	Horace A. Jones	Calumet Farm	1 1/4 Miles	2:01.60
1949	Coaltown	4	Steve Brooks	Horace A. Jones	Calumet Farm	1 1/4 Miles	2:03.40
1948	Stud Poker	5	Robert L. Baird	Paul L. Kelley	Edward E. Voynow	1 1/4 Miles	2:04.40
1947	Armed	6	Douglas Dodson	Horace A. Jones	Calumet Farm	1 1/4 Miles	2:02.40
1946	Historian	5	Ovie Scurlock	Edwin Anspach	Woolford Farm	1 1/4 Miles	2:01.00
1945	Busher	3	Johnny Longden	George M. Odom	Louis B. Mayer	1 1/4 Miles	2:03.80
1944	War Knight	4	Chaeles Corbett	Hurst Philpot	Miss Ethel Hill	1 1/4 Miles	2:02.00
1943	Marriage	7	Guy Burns	Rene A. Coward	Rene A. Coward & Carl L. Dupuy	1 1/4 Miles	2:03.60
1942	Rounders	3	Fred A. Smith	Frank Catrone	Valdina Farm	1 1/4 Miles	2:04.00
1941	Equifox	4	Arthur Craig	Howard Wells	Howard Wells	1 3/16 Miles	1:58.80
	No race 1940						
1939	Count d'or	4	Johnny Longden	Don Cameron	Fannie Hertz	1 1/4 Miles	2:05.00
1938	Cardinalis	4	J. G. Wilson	Paul L. Kelley	Paul L. Kelley	1 1/4 Miles	2:05.00
1937	Dellor	3	Sterling Young	John Milton Goode	James W. Parrish	1 1/4 Miles	2:03.20
1936	Sun Teddy	3	Basil James	Bert B. Williams	Calumet Farm	1 1/4 Miles	2:02.00
1935	Discovery	4	John Bejshak	Bud Stotler	Alfred G. Vanderbilt II	1 1/4 Miles	2:01.20
1934	Riskulus	3	Don Meade	Elwood L. Fitzgerald	Norman W. Church	1 1/4 Miles	2:02.40
1933	Equipoise	5	Raymond Workman	Thomas J. Healey	C. V. Whitney	1 1/4 Miles	2:02.60
1932	Plucky Play	5	George Woolf	Elwood L. Fitzgerald	Northway Stable	1 1/4 Miles	2:02.20
1931	Sun Beau	6	Charley Phillips	Jack Whyte	Willis Sharpe Kilmer	1 1/4 Miles	2:03.20
1930	Pigeon Hole	5	Robert Finnerty	Walter W. Taylor	Hal Price Headley	1 1/4 Miles	2:07.60
1929	Misstep	4	Clarence McCrossen	Mose Lowenstein	Le Mar Stock Farm (Leo J. Marks)	1 1/8 Miles	1:50.40
