= Kenneth Church =

Canadian jockey (1930–2020)

Personal information
- Born: March 24, 1930 Windsor, Ontario, Canada
- Died: July 13, 2020 (aged 90) Reno, Nevada, U.S.
- Occupation: Jockey

Horse racing career
- Sport: Horse racing
- Career wins: 2,000+

Major racing wins
- Breeders' Futurity (1949); Ben Ali Handicap (1950); Hanshin Cup Handicap (1950, 1961); Everglades Stakes (1950); Flamingo Stakes (1950); Remsen Stakes (1950); Stars and Stripes Handicap (1950); Washington Park Handicap (1950); Arlington-Washington Lassie Stakes (1951); Columbiana Handicap (1951); New Orleans Handicap (1951, 1952, 1955); Palm Beach Handicap (1951); Phoenix Handicap (1951, 1964); Bashford Manor Stakes (1952, 1960); Black Helen Handicap (1952); Clark Handicap (1952); New Orleans Handicap (1952); Gulfstream Park Handicap (1953); Palm Beach Handicap (1953); Royal Palm Handicap (1953, 1955); Ohio Derby (1957); Spinster Stakes (1957, 1958); Fayette Handicap (1959, 1963); Canadian Championship Stakes (1960); Del Mar Oaks (1963); Del Mar Handicap (1963, 1964); Santa Ynez Stakes (1963); Frank E. Kilroe Mile Handicap (1964); San Juan Capistrano Handicap (1964); San Marcos Handicap (1964); Santa Margarita Handicap (1964, 1965); Santa Maria Handicap (1964); Bing Crosby Handicap (1965); Californian Stakes (1965); Carter Handicap (1965); Del Mar Futurity (1965); Malibu Stakes (1965); Ramona Handicap (1965)

Racing awards
- Leading jockey at Arlington Park (1950); Leading jockey at Washington Park (1953)

Honours
- Windsor / Essex County Sports Hall of Fame (1997)

Significant horses
- Oil Capitol, Crafty Admiral, Mr. Consistency, Native Diver

Kenneth Stanley Church (March 24, 1930 – July 13, 2020) was a Canadian jockey in Thoroughbred horse racing.

== Apprenticeship ==
Born in Windsor, Ontario, in his early teens Church began riding ponies and in 1946 got a job as an exercise rider at Old Woodbine Race Course in Toronto, Ontario. The following year, he was offered a chance to apprentice for future U.S. Racing Hall of Fame trainer Harry Trotsek who was widely recognized for his eye for riding talent and who also developed Hall of Fame jockeys, Johnny Sellers and John Rotz. Kenneth Church began competing in novice races for jockeys which Trotsek had organized at Detroit Fair Grounds Racetrack. On July 12, 1947, he won the first race of a twenty-year career that would see him win more than 2,000 races from 14,000 mounts.

== Riding career ==
During his career, Church rode at various tracks throughout the United States and was nicknamed "The Prince" by his fellow jockeys because of his blonde wavy hair and good looks. In Chicago, he won riding titles at Arlington Park and Washington Park Race Track and one year had more combined wins on the Florida racing circuit than any other jockey. On June 10, 1952, he won five races in a row on a single racecard at the Lincoln Fields program at Washington Park. Of his four mounts in the Kentucky Derby, Kenneth Church's best result was a fifth-place finish in 1950 aboard Oil Capitol. Among his major race wins, Church won a premier Florida event in 1953, capturing the Gulfstream Park Handicap aboard Crafty Admiral with what the Los Angeles Times described as a "masterful ride." In 1960 he won the Canadian Championship Stakes at Woodbine Racetrack. In 1963, he relocated to California where he made his permanent home and in 1964, won the richest and most important race in California, the Santa Anita Handicap aboard Mr. Consistency.

== Heroism at Arlington ==
On July 5, 1950, at Chicago's Arlington Park, Kenneth Church was the hero of an incident the Chicago Daily Tribune called, "One of the most unselfish and gallant acts to be found in all the lore of the turf." During the third race of the day, jockey Wendell Eads lost his stirrup and dangled perilously from his horse. Seeing the danger, Church charged up from behind and once alongside reached over with his left arm and lifted Eads back onto his horse. At the finish of the race, fans gave him a standing ovation. In a ceremony three days later at the track, for his heroism Kenneth Church received a gold watch from America's preeminent horseman, Warren Wright of Calumet Farm, plus a special commendation from the State of Illinois.

== Retirement ==
Following his retirement from riding at the end of May, 1967, Kenneth Church remained in the industry and worked for many years in the publicity department at Del Mar Racetrack in Del Mar, California.

In 1997, Kenneth Church was inducted in the city of Windsor, Ontario / Essex County, Ontario Sports Hall of Fame.

== Death ==
In early July 2020, Church contracted COVID-19 and pneumonia and died days later on July 13, 2020, during the COVID-19 pandemic in Nevada.
