= Steve Brooks (jockey) =

American jockey

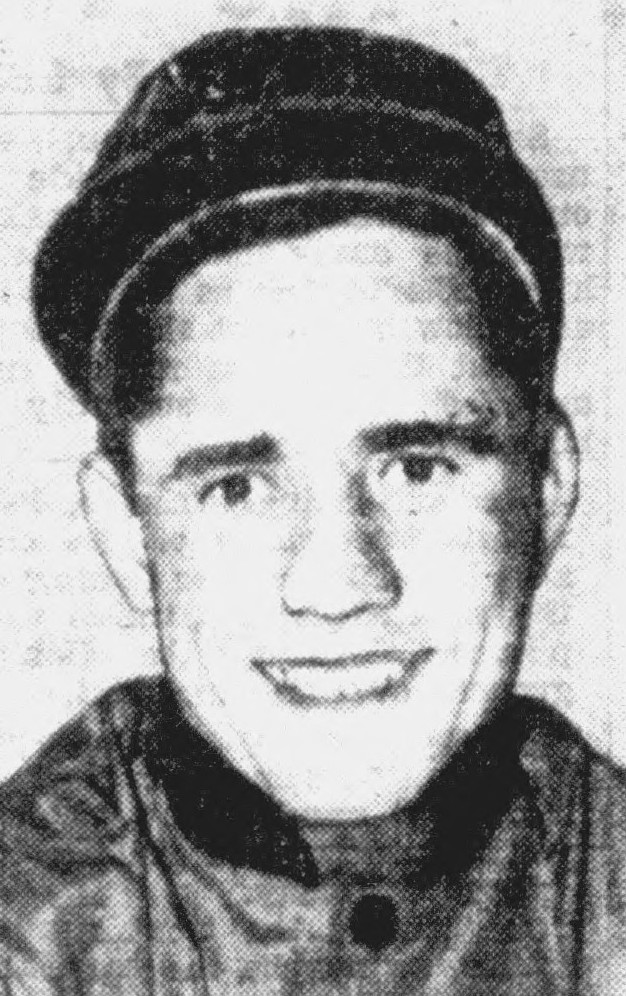
- Brooks, circa 1951

Personal information
- Born: August 12, 1922 McCook, Nebraska
- Died: September 23, 1979 (aged 57) Louisville, Kentucky
- Occupation: Jockey

Horse racing career
- Sport: Horse racing
- Career wins: 4,451

Major racing wins
- Arlington Matron Stakes (1941, 1948, 1956); Modesty Stakes (1942); Brooklyn Handicap (1943); Excelsior Handicap (1943); Manhattan Handicap (1943); New York Handicap (1943); Saratoga Cup (1943); Travers Stakes (1943, 1961); Arlington-Washington Futurity (1945, 1951); Breeders' Futurity Stakes (1945, 1946, 1947, 1956); Stars and Stripes Handicap (1945, 1949); Clark Handicap (1947, 1948, 1950); American Derby (1949, 1961); Arlington Classic (1949); Arlington Handicap (1949, 1950); Black-Eyed Susan Stakes (1949); Arlington-Washington Lassie Stakes (1949, 1952, 1954, 1959, 1960); Coaching Club American Oaks (1949); Washington Park Handicap (1949); Whirlaway Handicap (1949, 1951); San Antonio Handicap (1950); Santa Margarita Handicap (1950); Strub Stakes (1950); Hollywood Gold Cup (1951, 1952); Ben Ali Handicap (1952, 1955, 1960, 1962); Blue Grass Stakes (1952); San Vicente Stakes (1952); Hawthorne Gold Cup Handicap (1953); Alcibiades Stakes (1955); Ashland Stakes (1956, 1961); Lafayette Stakes (1956); Phoenix Handicap (1957); Michigan Mile And One-Sixteenth Handicap (1962); Molly Pitcher Handicap (1963); Narragansett Special (1963); Palm Beach Handicap (1963) American Classic Race wins: Kentucky Derby (1949)

Racing awards
- United States Champion Jockey by earnings (1949); George Woolf Memorial Jockey Award (1962)

Honours
- National Museum of Racing and Hall of Fame (1963); Nebraska Horse Racing Hall of Fame (1971)

Significant horses
- Princequillo, Stymie, Devil Diver, Citation, Ponder, Ridan, Two Lea, Bewitch, Coaltown, Hill Gail, Princequillo, Round Table
- Updated on May 22, 2009

Steve Brooks (August 12, 1922 – September 23, 1979) was an American National Champion and Hall of Fame jockey. The son of a horse dealer, he was born in McCook, Nebraska. He began riding horses as a boy of ten and at age sixteen in 1938 won his first race at an accredited race track.

Steve Brooks skills led him to move to Chicago, Illinois to race at one of the United States' major venues, Arlington Park. There, in 1941 he won the Arlington Matron Stakes and in 1942 rode the Hal Price Headley-owned Lotopoise to victory in the first running of the Modesty Stakes. Brooks later rode the prestigious Calumet Farm horses when they raced at Arlington Park and for three straight years from 1947 through 1949 won Arlington's riding title.

In 1948 Steve Brooks won six races in a single day at Churchill Downs then at the same track the following year won the Kentucky Derby's Diamond Jubilee aboard Calumet Farm's colt, Ponder. Sent off by bettors at 16:1 odds, Brooks brought the colt from last in the field of fourteen horses to win going away over the Greentree Stable colt, Capot. Brooks went on to become the 1949 Champion Jockey by total earnings and runner-up in total wins.

Steve Brooks set a world record for the mile aboard the U.S. Triple Crown Champion Citation in winning the 1950 Golden Gate Mile at Golden Gate Fields. He also rode Citation to victory in the 1951 Hollywood Gold Cup, a win that made Citation the first horse in history to earn more than $1 million. In the 1959 Citation Handicap, an exhibition race at Washington Park Racetrack to honor the great horse, Brooks rode Round Table to victory. In 1952, he rode Charles T. Fisher's Sub Fleet to a second-place finish in the Kentucky Derby and to fifth in the Preakness Stakes.

At age forty in 1961, Steve Brooks was the leading jockey at Monmouth Park and on April 8, 1963, became only the fifth jockey in American Thoroughbred racing history to win 4,000 races. He retired in 1970, but continued working with racehorses. He made a comeback in 1975 but rode for only a short time. In 1979 Brooks was injured when he was thrown to the ground while exercising a horse at Arlington Park in Chicago. He died a few weeks later after undergoing surgery for a torn esophagus at Saints Mary and Elizabeth Hospital in Louisville, Kentucky.

== Racing honors ==
Steve Brooks was inducted into the U. S. Racing Hall of Fame in 1963 and in 1971 was elected to the Nebraska Horse Racing Hall of Fame.
