= Japan Turf Cup Stakes =

- Class: Ungraded Stakes
- Location: Laurel Park Racecourse, Laurel, Maryland, United States
- Inaugurated: 1952
- Race type: Thoroughbred - Flat racing
- Website: www.laurelpark.com

Race information
- Distance: 1 1/2 miles (12 furlongs)
- Surface: Turf
- Track: Left-handed
- Qualification: Three-years-old & up
- Weight: Assigned
- Purse: $100,000

The Japan Turf Cup Stakes is an American Thoroughbred horse race run, held annually at Maryland's Laurel Park Racecourse. Open to horses age three and older, it is currently run on grass at a distance of one and one-half miles.

Previously run as the Laurel Turf Cup Stakes, it was renamed the Japan Turf Cup Stakes in 2019.

The race was a grade three race from 1985 through 2000. The Turf Cup was taken off the grass and run on the dirt of the main track on the following years; 1971, 72, 75, 76, 85, 86, 90, 96 and 1997. The race was not run between 2007 and 2010. It was announced by Laurel Park that the famed race would be restored in 2012 and run on October 27 at 12 furlongs and named the Laurel Turf Cup Stakes. In 2014 the race was cut back to 6 furlongs and renamed the Laurel Dash Stakes.

== Records ==
Speed record:

- 1 1/8 miles - 1:40.40 - Dreadnaught (2005)
- 1 1/2 miles - 2:25.00 - Native Courier (1978)
- 1 1/4 miles - 1:59.20 - Storm on the Loose (1986)

Most wins by a trainer:

- 3 - King T. Leatherbury (1991, 2011 & 2011)

Most wins by a jockey:

- 3 - Edgar Prado (1993, 1997 & 1998)

== Winners of the Laurel Turf Cup Stakes ==
Yr	Winner	Jockey	Trainer	Owner	Dist.	Time	Purse	Gr
2020					1-1/2	0:00.00	$100,000	
2019	O Dionysus	Jevian Toledo	Gary A. Capuano	Marathon Farms	1-1/2	2:28.42	$100,000	
2018		Race not held						
2017	Snowday	Daniel Centeno	J. Willard Thompson	Quiet Winter Farm	6 fur.	1:09.02	$100,000	
2016	Mosler	Edgar S. Prado	William I. Mott	Adele B. Dilschneider	6 fur.	1:08.26	$100,000	
2015	Spring to the Sky	Michael Luzzi	Bruce R. Brown	Anthony P. McCarthy	6 fur.	1:13.57	$100,000	
2014	Dreamsgonewild	Trevor McCarthy	Bruce F. Alexander	Paul M. Steckel	6 fur.	1:07.99	$100,000	
2013	Ben's Cat	Julian Pimentel	King T. Leatherbury	The Jim Stable	6 fur.	1:07.40	$100,000	
2012	Dannhauser	Sheldon Russell	Kathleen O'Connell	Prince Farm LLC	1-1/2	2:27.17	$100,000	
2011	Jazzy Idea	Elvis Trujillo	Edwin W. Merryman	Edwin W. Merryman	6 fur.	1:07.29	$100,000	
2007	2010	Race not held						
2005	Dreadnaught	Jerry D. Bailey	Thomas H. Voss	Trillium Stable	1-1/8	1:47.40	$75,000	
2001	2004	Race not held						
2000	Dynamic Trick	Mark Johnston	King T. Leatherbury	Charles N. Bassford	1-1/2	2:29.00	$100,000	III
1999	John's Call	Steve Hamilton	Thomas H. Voss	Trillium Stable	1-1/2	2:33.40	$100,000	III
1998	A Little Luck	Edgar Prado	Barclay Tagg	Kathleen Crompton	1-1/2	2:30.20	$100,000	III
1997	Algar	Edgar Prado	Barbara C. Graham	Barbara C. Graham	1-1/4	2:05.00	$100,000	III
1996	Rugged Bugger	Mario Pino	Katherine M. Voss	Sture G. Olsson	1-1/4	2:01.80	$100,000	III
1995	Hasten to Add	Eddie Martin Jr.	Jim Day	Gary Norris	1-1/2	2:40.80	$100,000	III
1994	Asserche	Mark Johnston	John V. Alecci	John V. Alecci	1-1/2	2:29.60	$100,000	III
1993	Square Cut	Edgar Prado	Joseph A. Devereux	Arthur Benjamin Racing	1-1/2	2:32.40	$200,000	III
1992	Master Dreamer	Mike Luzzi	Annie Weeden-Smart	Due Process Stable	1-1/2	2:43.80	$200,000	III
1991	Learned Jake	Mike Luzzi	King T. Leatherbury	Silver Hawk Stable	1-1/2	2:30.00	$100,000	III
1990	Chas' Whim	Anthony Stacy	Rodger M. Gill	Harriet Heubeck	1-1/4	2:03.00	$100,000	III
1989	Ten Keys	Kent Desormeaux	Michael V. Pino	Charles Linhoss	1-1/2	2:34.80	$100,000	III
1988	Grey Classic	Robin Platts	Jim Day	Sam-Son Farm	1-1/2	2:37.20	$100,000	III
1987	Yankee Affair	Matthew Vigliotti	Henry L. Carroll	Ju Ju Gen Stable	1-1/4	2:00.40	$125,000	III
1986	Storm on the Loose	Gary Stahlbaum			1-1/4	1:59.20	$125,000	III
1985	Crazy Moon	Kelly Castaneda	William D. Curtis Jr.	Dogwood Stable	1-1/4	2:04.00	$215,000	III
1984	Domynski	Vincent Bracciale Jr.			1-1/2	2:30.00	$120,000	III
1983	Chem	Donnie A. Miller Jr.	John Gosden		1-1/2	2:31.40	$70,000	
1982	Royal Roberto	Jeffrey Fell			1-1/2	2:27.80	$70,000	
1981	Change the Patch	Don MacBeth	Robert D. DeBonis		1-1/2	2:29.20	$70,000	
1980	Yvonand	Vincent Bracciale Jr.			1-1/2	2:28.80	$70,000	
1979	Race not held							
1978	Native Courier	Eddie Maple	Sidney Watters Jr.		1-1/2	2:25.00	$70,000	
1977	Grey Beret	Leroy Moyers			1-1/2	2:32.00	$45,000	
1976	Take the Pledge	Greg McCarron			1-1/4	2:04.00	$35,000	
1975	Continuous Count	Jack Kurtz			1-1/4	2:03.60	$35,000	
1974	Clyde William	Herb Hinojosa			1-1/2	2:29.40	$30,000	
1973	Anono	Mike Venezia			1-1/2	2:27.00	$30,000	
1972	Amber Hawk	Barry Alberts			1-1/2	2:29.40	$32,500	
1971	Crack Ruler	Carlos Jimenez			1-1/4	2:04.80	$31,500	
1970	Barking Steeple	Carlos Barrera			1-1/2	2:38.40	$32,500	
1969	One for All	Chuck Baltazar			1-1/2	2:28.60	$25,000	
1968	Sea Castle	Hector Pilar	Patrocinio Jardon	Frank C. Tortora	1-1/2	2:34.40	$26,750	
1967	Jean-Pierre	Braulio Baeza			1-1/2	2:35.00	$36,000	
1966	Knightly Manner	Tommy Lee			1-3/8	2:20.40	$35,000	
1965	Chieftain	Ismael Valenzuela	Frank Whiteley Jr.	Powhatan Stable	1-1/8	1:47.80	$25,000	
1964	Turbo Jet II	Howard Grant			1-1/8	1:50.60	$30,750	
1963	Parka	Walter Blum			1-1/8	1:51.00	$25,000	
1962	Bronze Babu	Herb Hinojosa			1-1/8	1:55.40	$25,000	
1961	Race not held							
1960	Quiz Star	Howard Grant	Burley Parke	Harbor View Farm	1-1/8	1:51.60	$25,000	
1959	Li'l Fella	William Camer	J. Bowes Bond	Jaclyn Stable	1-1/8	1:52.60	$25,000	
1958	Tudor Era	Willie Harmatz	Arnold N. Winick	Mrs. Herbert Herff	1-1/8	1:47.80	$25,000	
1957	Mahan	Sam Boulmetis Sr.	Harry Trotsek	Hasty House Farm	1-1/8	1:53.40	$27,500	
1956	Traffic Judge	Jack Westrope			1-1/8	1:54.20	$26,500	
1955	Aeschylus	Fred A. Smith		Douglas R. Small	1-1/8	1:47.20	$30,000	
1954	Stan	Eldon Nelson			1-1/8	1:51.00	$30,000	
1953	Sunglow	Dave Gorman			1-1/8	1:51.20	$25,000	
1952	Brush Burn	Rocco Sisto	Stanley C. Mikell	Stanley C. Mikell	1-1/8	1:48.40	$20,000	

== See also ==
- Laurel Turf Cup Stakes top three finishers
- Laurel Park Racecourse
