= Oil Capitol =

American-bred Thoroughbred racehorse

- Sire: Mahmoud
- Grandsire: Blenheim
- Dam: Never Again II
- Damsire: Pharos
- Sex: Stallion
- Foaled: 1947
- Country: United States
- Colour: Gray
- Breeder: Elmendorf Farm
- Owner: 1) Thomas Gray & Cora M. Trotsek; 2) Hasty House Farm & Cora M. Trotsek
- Trainer: Harry Trotsek
- Record: 80: 19-10-9
- Earnings: US$580,756

Major wins
- Lansing Stakes (1949); Pimlico Futurity (1949); Keeneland Sales Stakes (1949); Breeders' Futurity (1949); Everglades Stakes (1950); Flamingo Stakes (1950); Butler Handicap (1951); New Orleans Handicap (1952); Palm Beach Handicap (1953); Widener Handicap (1953); Ben Ali Stakes (1953); Arlington Handicap (1953)

Awards
- TSD American Champion Two-Year-Old Colt (1949)

Oil Capitol (1947–1959) was an American Thoroughbred Champion racehorse.

== Background ==
Oil Capitol, a dark gray colt, was bred by the Widener family's Elmendorf Farm in Fayette County, Kentucky. He was sired by the French-bred runner Mahmoud, the 1936 winner of England's Epsom Derby. Out of the mare Never Again II, his damsire was the very important Pharos, the leading sire in Great Britain & Ireland in 1931 and the leading sire in France in 1939, who also sired the Nearco.

Oil Capitol was owned by the wife of trainer Harry Trotsek in partnership with Thomas Grey of Tulsa, Oklahoma. Grey gave the colt the name, which, spelled with an "o" instead of an "a," was taken from the common reference to the city of Tulsa as the "Oil Capital of the World."

== Racing career ==
At age two, Oil Capitol had his best year in racing. Ridden by Kenneth Church, the colt notably won the Breeders' Futurity in October and the important Pimlico Futurity in Maryland two weeks later, beating Lots o'Luck by a head. He equaled the Keeneland track record for 6½ furlongs and was named 1949 American Champion Two-Year-Old Colt in a poll conducted by Turf and Sport Digest Magazine. He lost the rival Daily Racing Form poll to Hill Prince.

As a three-year-old in 1950, at Hialeah Park Race Track in Hialeah, Florida, Oil Capitol won the Everglades Stakes and the Flamingo Stakes, which were important prep races for the Kentucky Derby. He won the latter race in front of a 28,000 crowd by six lengths in a time of 1:48.2, confirming his position as Derby favorite. He then finished second in the Blue Grass Stakes before going on to the Derby, where he deadheated for fifth. Thomas Grey sold his interest in Oil Capitol during the latter part of 1951 to Allie Reuben's Hasty House Farm. The horse continued to win important races until he retired after the 1953 racing season.

== Stud record ==
Oil Capitol met with limited success as a sire. He died on March 9, 1959, at Crown Crest Farm near Lexington, Kentucky, from enterolith.
