= Joseph H. Pierce Jr. =

American Thoroughbred racehorse owner and trainer (1927–2018)

Personal information
- Born: June 24, 1927 Washington, D.C., United States
- Died: June 7, 2018 (aged 90)
- Occupation: Trainer / Owner

Horse racing career
- Sport: Horse racing
- Career wins: 2,256

Major racing wins
- Arlington Handicap (1962); Canadian International Stakes (1962); Jockey Club Cup Handicap (1962); Hawthorne Gold Cup Handicap (1964); Manhattan Handicap (1964); Modesty Handicap (1966, 1967); Arlington-Washington Lassie Stakes (1969, 1972); Washington Park Handicap (1969); Red Bank Stakes (1974); Cliff Hanger Stakes (1980, 1987); Adirondack Stakes (1981); Miss Woodford Stakes (1983); Lamplighter Stakes (1986); Acorn Stakes (1987); Black-Eyed Susan Stakes (1987); Woodbine Handicap (1988); Vagrancy Handicap (1988); Alcibiades Stakes (1990); First Flight Handicap (1989); Jenny Wiley Stakes (1989); Monmouth Oaks (1989); Tyro Stakes (1990 (2 divs.); Bourbon Stakes (1991); Palm Beach Stakes (1991); Spinaway Stakes (1992); Jerome Handicap (1996); General George Handicap (1997); Matchmaker Stakes (1997)

Racing awards
- Raines Distinguished Achievement Award (1999)

Significant horses
- Dream Deal, El Bandido, Family Enterprize, Friendly Lover, Grecian Flight, Night Invader, Quiz Show

Joseph H. Pierce Jr. (born June 24, 1927 – June 7, 2018) was an American Thoroughbred racehorse owner and trainer who won 2,256 races during his career.

Joseph Pierce Jr. served with the United States Navy during World War II. The son of a horse trainer, Joseph Sr. was widely known as "Slim" and is remembered as the trainer of Chicle II for the Palatine Stable of Frank Rosen. After the War ended, Joseph Jr. learned the business from his father and in 1956 took out his own trainers license. Since the late 1960s he had made Monmouth Park his home base.
