= Harry Trotsek =

American horse trainer (1912–1997)

Personal information
- Born: April 18, 1912 Cicero, Illinois, United States
- Died: February 5, 1997 (aged 84) Coral Gables, Florida, United States
- Occupation: Trainer / owner

Horse racing career
- Sport: Horse racing
- Career wins: 1,690

Major racing wins
- Lane's End Breeders' Futurity (1949, 1953); Buckeye Handicap (1950, 1951); Hanshin Cup (1950, 1953, 1955); Stars and Stripes Turf Handicap (1950, 1962, 1972, 1974, 1976); Washington Park Handicap (1950, 1974, 1975); Arlington Lassie Stakes (1951, 1953); Butler Handicap (1951); Hawthorne Gold Cup Handicap (1951); Clark Handicap (1952); Ben Ali Stakes; Lincoln Handicap (1952, 1953) (1952, 1953, 1954, 1955); Arlington Handicap (1953, 1954, 1955); Arlington-Washington Futurity Stakes (1953); Kentucky Jockey Club Stakes (1953); Lawrence Realization Stakes (1953); Modesty Handicap (1953, 1956, 1958); Black-Eyed Susan Stakes (1954); Derby Trial (1954); Orchid Handicap (1954); Phoenix Handicap (1954, 1955, 1956, 1967); Hialeah Turf Cup Handicap (1955, 1962, 1964); Royal Palm Handicap (1955, 1956); Suwannee River Handicap (1955); Widener Handicap (1955); Arch Ward Handicap (1956); Illinois Breeders Stakes (1959); Grey Stakes (1960); Jockey Club Cup Handicap (1960); Round Table Handicap (1962, 1974); Alcibiades Stakes (1965); Gardenia Stakes (1965); Matron Stakes (1965); Selima Stakes (1965); Spinaway Stakes (1965); Test Stakes (1966); Arkansas Derby (1967); Lafayette Stakes (1968); Bahamas Stakes (1974); Hibiscus Stakes (1976); Stepping Stone Purse (1978); Arlington Oaks (1980, 1985) International race wins: Washington, D.C. International Stakes (1957); Canadian International Stakes (1958, 1959) U.S. Triple Crown series wins: Preakness Stakes (1954)

Racing awards
- United States Champion Thoroughbred Trainer by earnings (1953)

Honours
- National Museum of Racing and Hall of Fame (1984); Fair Grounds Racing Hall of Fame

Significant horses
- Hasty Road, Jack Ketch, Mahan, Moccasin, Oil Capitol, Queen Hopeful, Stan

Harry E. Trotsek (April 18, 1912 – February 5, 1997) was an American Hall of Fame trainer and owner of Thoroughbred racehorses. He trained 96 stakes race winners including Champions Hasty Road, Moccasin, Oil Capitol, and Stan, and led all North American trainers in purse winnings in 1953.

Trotsek was widely respected for his development of young jockeys including such riders as Johnny Sellers, Kenneth Church and John Rotz.

== Retirement ==
After fifty-seven years as a trainer, Trotsek retired in 1988. He and his wife Cora Mae Hill Trotsek were living in Coral Gables, Florida, at the time of his death in 1997.

== Quotes ==
Known as a very patient trainer who got the most out of horses under his care, Trotsek is noted for an interview in which he said that "Good horses, overcome all sorts of things—including their trainers."
