= Larry Snyder (jockey) =

American jockey

Personal information
- Born: June 29, 1942 Toledo, Ohio, U.S.
- Died: October 29, 2018 (aged 76)
- Occupation: Jockey

Horse racing career
- Sport: Horse racing
- Career wins: 6388

Major racing wins
- Black Gold Handicap (1966); Apple Blossom Handicap (1969); Oaklawn Handicap (1970); Razorback Handicap (1970, 1980, 1986); Arlington Handicap (1974); Arlington Matron Handicap (1975); Stars and Stripes Turf Handicap (1975); American Derby (1977); Rebel Stakes (1978, 1982, 1983); Southwest Stakes (1979, 1983, 1990); Sorority Stakes (1980); Count Fleet Sprint Handicap (1981, 1983, 1988); Arkansas Derby (1989)

Racing awards
- United States Champion Jockey by wins (1969); George Woolf Memorial Jockey Award (1989)

Honours
- Arkansas Sports Hall of Fame (1988); Fair Grounds Racing Hall of Fame (1999); Arkansas Walk of Fame (2004)

Significant horses
- Buffalo Lark, Sunny's Halo

Larry Lloyd Snyder (June 29, 1942 – October 29, 2018) was an American Thoroughbred horse racing jockey whose career spanned thirty-five years from 1960 to 1994. In the early 1960s he began competing at Oaklawn Park Race Track in Hot Springs, Arkansas where he would win eight riding titles. Beginning in 1964, he also rode at Arlington Park in Chicago where he won the riding title in 1974 and 1976, then at Louisiana Downs in Bossier City, Louisiana he won six riding titles between 1981 and 1986.

In 1969 Snyder won 352 races, more than any other jockey in the United States that year. On April 1, 1969, Snyder won six races on a single card at Oaklawn Park, the first jockey to ever do so at that racetrack. On August 17, 1981, Snyder tied a Louisiana Downs record when he rode five winners on a single program, including for all three divisions of the Myrtlewood Stakes. Among his notable wins were victories in the 1983 Rebel Stakes aboard that year's Kentucky Derby winner, Sunny's Halo, as well as the 1989 Arkansas Derby on Dansil whom he would ride to a fourth-place finish in both the Kentucky Derby and Preakness Stakes.

At Louisiana Downs on August 24, 1989, Larry Snyder became only the sixth rider in U.S. racing history to reach 6,000 wins. That year, his distinguished career was recognized by his peers through the prestigious George Woolf Memorial Jockey Award. The honor is awarded by Santa Anita Park to a North American jockey who demonstrates high standards of personal and professional conduct, on and off the racetrack.

Snyder's last full season of riding was in 1994. He retired with career earnings of $47,207,289 and 6,388 victories which ranked him in the top ten in career wins among American jockeys. After retiring, he worked as a race steward at Louisiana Downs and Oaklawn Park.

While still an active rider, in 1988 Larry Snyder was inducted in the Arkansas Sports Hall of Fame and in retirement, in 2001 was honored on the Arkansas Walk of Fame in Hot Springs. He was nominated for induction in 2006 in the National Museum of Racing and Hall of Fame. In 1999, he was inducted into the Fair Grounds Racing Hall of Fame.

Snyder died of cancer on October 29, 2018, aged 76.
