= Royal Palm Handicap =

- Class: Discontinued stakes
- Location: Hialeah Park Race Track
- Inaugurated: 1946
- Race type: Thoroughbred

Race information
- Distance: 1 1/16 miles (8.5 furlongs
- Surface: Turf
- Track: Left-handed
- Qualification: Three-year-olds & up
- Purse: US$100,000

The Royal Palm Handicap was a Thoroughbred race for horses age three and older raced between 1946 and 2001 at Hialeah Park Race Track in Hialeah, Florida. It was raced on dirt from inception in 1946 to 1976 after which it was run on the grass course with the exceptions of 1986 and 1997 when, for safety concerns due to the effects of inclement weather, the race was shifted to the main dirt track.

== Historical notes ==
The inaugural running of the Royal Palm took place on January 23, 1946 and was won by the four-year-old gelding Concordian. Owned by Barney Murphy, trained by Robert Odom and ridden by Joe Renick, they would soon follow up with another win in Hialeah's McLennan Handicap.

Three Rings won this race in three consecutive years from 1949 through 1951. Retired with earnings of $297,077, Three Rings had been purchased for $7,500 by Evelyn L. Hopkins of Cleveland, Ohio from his breeder/owner John Phipps at a June 17, 1948 sale at Aqueduct Racetrack.

There was no race in 1977 and on its return on January 21, 1978 the Royal Palm became a race on turf.

The 1988 Royal Palm Handicap was run on December 5, 1987.

In the March 26, 1995 edition, D J's Rainbow and Gone For Real raced to a dead heat win.

The Royal Palm Handicap had its final running on opening day March 17, 2001 when Hialeah Park was celebrating its 75th anniversary. Hall of Fame jockey Jerry Bailey rode Del Mar Show to victory for Hall of Fame trainer Bill Mott.

== Records ==
Speed record:

- 1:39.60 @ 1-1/16 miles: Social Retiree (1994)
- 1:48.20 @ 1-1/8 miles: Hitting Away (1962)

Most wins:

- 3 - Three Rings (1949, 1950, 1951)

Most wins by a jockey:

- 4 - Jerry Bailey (1978, 1983, 1984, 2001)

Most wins by a trainer:

- 3 - William J. Knapp (1949, 1950, 1951)

Most wins by an owner:

- 3 - Evelyn L. Hopkins (1949, 1950, 1951)
- 3 - Ogden Phipps (1962, 1963, 1964)

== Winners ==
Year	Winner	Age	Jockey	Trainer	Owner	Dist. (Miles)	Time	Gr.
2001	Del Mar Show	4	Jerry Bailey	William I. Mott	Allen E. Paulson Living Trust	1-1/16 m (t)	1:39.80	L/R
2000	Wertz	4	Eibar Coa	Joseph Calascibetta	Sunshine Thoroughbred Corp.	1-1/16 m (t)	1:40.86	L/R
1999	Hurrahy	6	Eibar Coa	Martin D. Wolfson	Martin L. Cherry	1-1/16 m (t)	1:39.98	G3
1998	Born Mighty	4	Jose Rivera II	William P. White	Judson Van Worp	1-1/16 m (t)	1:43.04	G3
1997	Laughing Dan	4	Pedro Rodriguez	Luis Olivares	Cobble View Stable (Gardner F. Landon)	1-1/16 m (d)	1:42.36	G3
1996	Marcie's Ensign	4	Eibar Coa	Luis Olivares	Stanley Ersoff	1-1/16 m (t)	1:40.00	G3
1995	D J's Rainbow (DH) Gone For Real	5	Wigberto Ramos Joe Bravo	George R. Handy Flint S. Schulhofer	G. Thompson & James Velsor Morven Stud	1-1/16 m (t)	1:40.06	G3
1994	Social Retiree	7	Jose A. Santos	Barclay Tagg	Barclay Tagg	1-1/16 m (t)	1:39.60	
1993	I'm a Lil Devil	6	Miguel A. Gonzalez	Cindy A. Baulieu	Lawrence Durocher Jr.	1-1/8 m (t) (±)	1:47.80	
1992	Race not held							
1991	Stage Colony	4	Ricardo Lopez	Burke Kessinger Jr.	Gary Drake & Bruce Barton	1 1/16 m (t)	1:43.40	
1990	Race not held							
1989	Equalize	7	Jose A. Santos	Angel Penna Sr.	Alejandro Menditeguy	1-1/16 m (t)	1:40.60	G3
1988	Salem Drive	5	Gene St. Leon	Richard J. Lundy	Virginia Kraft Payson	1-1/16 m (t)	1:42.20	G3
1987	Storm on the Loose	4	Jorge Velasquez	Phil England	Richard R. Kennedy	1-1/16 m (t)	1:41.80	G3
1986	Czar Nijinsky	4	Herb McCauley	Clarence J. Hofher	Jacqueline & Miquel Torrealba	1-1/16 m (d)	1:40.40	G3
1985	Dr. Schwartzman	4	Craig Perret	Warren A. Croll Jr.	Blanche P. Levy	1-1/16 m (t)	1:41.80	G3
1984-1	Out of Hock	5	Carlos E. Lopez Sr.	Stanley M. Rieser	Charles J. Cella	1-1/16 m (t)	1:41.00	
1984-2	Erin's Tiger	6	Jerry Bailey	Richard S. Nieminski	Mrs. Dennis Wuesener	1-1/16 m (t)	1:42.00	
1983-1	McCann	5	Jerry Bailey	Stephen A. DiMauro	Dogwood Stable	1-1/16 m (t)	1:41.00	
1983-2	Discovered	5	Don MacBeth	Carl J. Domino	J. Louis Levesque Stables, Inc.	1-1/16 m (t)	1:40.80	
1982	Roll of Power	5	Alfred Gibert	Mitri Saliba	Buckram Oak Farm (Mahmoud Fustok)	1-1/16 m (t)	1:41.80	
1981	Spence Bay	6	Octavio Vergara	Neal J. Winick	Nelson Bunker Hunt & Summa Stable	1-1/16 m (t)	1:41.00	
1980	French Colonial	5	Jacinto Vasquez	David A. Whiteley	Lazy F Ranch	1-1/16 m (t)	1:41.00	
1990	Race not held							
1978-1	Interdicto	5	Mickey Solomone	Michael Aronow	Michael Aronow	1-1/16 m (t)	1:42.80	
1978-2	Dreaming of Moe	4	Jerry Bailey	Neal J. Winick	Maribel G. Blum	1-1/16 m (t)	1:42.80	
1977	Race not held							
1976	Knightly Sport	4	Heliodoro Gustines	John M. Gaver Jr.	Greentree Stable	7 f (d)	1:22.20	G3
1975	Sports Editor	4	Jorge Velasquez	John A. Nerud	June M. Benson	7 f (d)	1:22.20	G3
1974	Race not held							
1973-1	Nose For Money	4	Don MacBeth	W. R. (Bill) Smith	Warren Bleidner	7 f (d)	1:22.80	G3
1973-2	Traffic Cop	4	Marco Castaneda	James P. Conway	Adele L. Rand	7 f (d)	1:22.60	G3
1972	Farewell Party	4	Robert Woodhouse	J. Elliott Burch	Rokeby Stables	7 f (d)	1:22.60	
1971	Lion Sleeps	5	Bill Hartack	John Zarthar	Celestino Dilibero	7 f (d)	1:23.20	
1970	Fast Hilarious	4	Jacinto Vasquez	Joseph M. Bollero	Dorothy Comiskey Rigney	7 f (d)	1:21.60	
1969	Royal Exchange	4	Angel Cordero Jr.	Henry Forrest	Calumet Farm	7 f (d)	1:21.80	
1968	Jim J	4	Angel Cordero Jr.	Edward J. Yowell	Harold H. Polk	7 f (d)	1:23.00	
1967	Bold and Brave	4	Braulio Baeza	Edward A. Neloy	Wheatley Stable	7 f (d)	1:23.20	
1966	Gallant Romeo	5	Kennard Knapp	Willard L. Proctor	J. Graham Brown	7 f (d)	1:23.40	
1965	Sunstruck	5	William Boland	H. Allen Jerkens	Hobeau Farm	7 f (d)	1:23.20	
1964	Royal Ascot	4	Wayne Chambers	Alfred A. Robertson	Ogden Phipps	7 f (d)	1:23.20	
1963	Hitting Away	5	Johnny Sellers	James E. Fitzsimmons	Ogden Phipps	1-1/8 m (d)	1:47.60	
1962	Hitting Away	4	Bobby Ussery	James E. Fitzsimmons	Ogden Phipps	1-1/8 m (d)	1:48.20	
1961	Yorky	4	Johnny Sellers	Jimmy Jones	Calumet Farm	1-1/8 m (d)	1:49.60	
1960	Stratmat	6	George Gibb	Harry Silver	Modan Stable (Moe Fiengold)	1-1/8 m (d)	1:49.20	
1959	Petare	8	Gustavo Ávila	Millard F. Ziadie	Anselmo A. Dorato	1-1/8 m (d)	1:48.60	
1958	Kingmaker	5	Robert Ussery	Frank I. Wright	Happy Hill Farm (Cortright & Ella Wetherill)	1-1/8 m (d)	1:52.20	
1957	First Served	6	Sam Boulmetis	John A. Nerud	James J. Crowley	1-1/8 m (d)	1:50.00	
1956	Sea O Erin	5	Bill Hartack	Harry Trotsek	Hasty House Farm	1-1/8 m (d)	1:50.40	
1955	Sea O Erin	4	Kenneth Church	Harry Trotsek	Hasty House Farm	1-1/8 m (d)	1:53.00	
1954	Count Cain	4	Robert Permane	John W. Nizlek	John W. Nizlek	1-1/8 m (d)	1:49.20	
1953	Crafty Admiral	5	Kenneth Church	Robert B. Odom	Charfran Stable (Charles & Frances Cohen)	1-1/8 m (d)	1:53.80	
1952	Greek Ship	5	Ronnie Nash	Preston M. Burch	Brookmeade Stable	1-1/8 m (d)	1:49.40	
1951	Three Rings	6	Hedley Woodhouse	William J. Knapp	Evelyn L. Hopkins	1-1/8 m (d)	1:50.60	
1950	Three Rings	5	Hedley Woodhouse	William J. Knapp	Evelyn L. Hopkins	1-1/8 m (d)	1:49.40	
1949	Three Rings	4	Douglas Dodson	William J. Knapp	Evelyn L. Hopkins	1-1/8 m (d)	1:50.20	
1948	Incline	5	Douglas Dodson	Charles M. Feltner	Joseph Tucci	1-1/8 m (d)	1:49.60	
1947	Round View	4	Louis F. Hildebrandt	Hollie Hughes	Sanford Stud Farms	1-1/8 m (d)	1:50.20	
1946	Concordian	4	Joe Renick	Robert B. Odom	Barney A. Murphy	1-1/8 m (d)	1:49.60	
