= Jack Ketch (horse) =

Irish Thoroughbred racehorse

- Sire: Abadan
- Grandsire: Persian Gulf
- Dam: Law
- Damsire: Son-in-Law
- Sex: Stallion
- Foaled: 1954
- Country: Ireland
- Colour: Brown
- Owner: 1) M. P. Annesley (Ireland); 2) Hasty House Farm (USA)
- Trainer: 1) Stephen Quirke (Ireland); 2) Harry Trotsek (USA)
- Record: 30: 9-1-1
- Earnings: £6,048 & US$56,000

Major wins
- Maher Nursery Handicap (1956); Tetrarch Stakes (1957); International Stakes (1957); Irish 2,000 Guineas (1957); Canadian Championship Stakes (1958)

Jack Ketch (foaled 1954 in Ireland) was a thoroughbred racehorse. Raced at age two under trainer Stephen Quirke, son of Irish champion jockey, Martin Quirke, Jack Ketch won the Maher Nursery Handicap. At age three, the colt won three important Irish races including the Classic 2,000 Guineas.

In 1958, Jack Ketch was sold to American Allie E. Reuben who raced under the name of Hasty House Farm. Trained by future U.S. Racing Hall of Fame trainer, Harry Trotsek, he made his American debut on 14 July 1958 at Chicago's Arlington Park with a win on turf in the Morton Grove Purse. Jack Ketch would not win another significant race until 25 October 1958 when he won the Canadian Championship Stakes with his Hasty House Farm stablemate Mahan finishing second.

Retired to stud duty after racing with minor success as a five-year-old in 1959, Jack Ketch eventually stood in Australia but was not a successful sire.
