= George Woolf Memorial Jockey Award =

Annual horse-racing award presented by Santa Anita Park in Arcadia, California, USA

The George Woolf Memorial Jockey Award has been presented by Santa Anita Park in Arcadia, California, annually since 1950 to the thoroughbred horse racing jockey in North America who demonstrates high standards of personal and professional conduct both on and off the racetrack.

The award was created through donations from the racing public after the death of Hall of Fame jockey George Woolf. The one-time-only award is voted on by members of the Jockeys' Guild who chose from among their peers nominated by Guild regional managers. The trophy that goes along with the award is a one-foot-high replica of the life-size statue of George Woolf that, along with a bronze sculpture of his favorite mount, Seabiscuit, has a place of honor in the Santa Anita Paddock Gardens.

Past winners:

- 2026 : Julien Leparoux
- 2025 : Kendrick Carmouche
- 2024 : Junior Alvarado
- 2023 : Javier Castellano
- 2022 : Joe Bravo
- 2021 : Deshawn L. Parker
- 2020 : Luis M. Quinones
- 2019 : Scott Stevens
- 2018 : José C. Ferrer
- 2017 : Stewart Elliott
- 2016 : Victor Espinoza
- 2015 : Mike Luzzi
- 2014 : Corey Lanerie
- 2013 : Mario G. Pino
- 2012 : Ramon A. Dominguez
- 2011 : Garrett K. Gomez
- 2010 : Calvin Borel
- 2009 : John Velazquez
- 2008 : Richard Migliore
- 2007 : Jon Court
- 2006 : Mark Guidry
- 2005 : Ray Sibille
- 2004 : Robby Albarado
- 2003 : Edgar Prado
- 2002 : Russell Baze
- 2001 : Dean Kutz
- 2000 : Mike E. Smith
- 1999 : José A. Santos
- 1998 : Craig Perret
- 1997 : Alex Solis
- 1996 : Gary Stevens
- 1995 : Eddie Maple
- 1994 : Phil Grove
- 1993 : Kent Desormeaux
- 1992 : Jerry Bailey
- 1991 : Earlie Fires
- 1990 : John L. Lively
- 1989 : Larry Snyder
- 1988 : Don Brumfield
- 1987 : Don MacBeth
- 1986 : Jorge Velásquez
- 1985 : Pat Day
- 1984 : Steve Cauthen
- 1983 : Marco Castaneda
- 1982 : Pat Valenzuela
- 1981 : Eddie Delahoussaye
- 1980 : Chris McCarron
- 1979 : Ron Turcotte
- 1978 : Darrel McHargue
- 1977 : Frank Olivares
- 1976 : Sandy Hawley
- 1975 : Fernando Toro
- 1974 : Álvaro Pineda
- 1973 : John L. Rotz
- 1972 : Ángel Cordero Jr.
- 1971 : Jerry Lambert
- 1970 : Laffit Pincay Jr.
- 1969 : Johnny Sellers
- 1968 : Braulio Baeza
- 1967 : Donald Pierce
- 1966 : Alex Maese
- 1965 : Walter Blum
- 1964 : Manuel Ycaza
- 1963 : Ismael Valenzuela
- 1962 : Steve Brooks
- 1961 : Peter Moreno
- 1960 : William Harmatz
- 1959 : William Boland
- 1958 : Merlin Volzke
- 1957 : Ted Atkinson
- 1956 : John H. Adams
- 1955 : Raymond York
- 1954 : Ralph Neves
- 1953 : Eddie Arcaro
- 1952 : Johnny Longden
- 1951 : Bill Shoemaker
- 1950 : Gordon Glisson
