= Fred A. Smith (jockey) =

Fred Smith
Personal information
- Born: c. 1913 Camagüey, Cuba
- Died: June 28, 1951 (aged 38)
- Occupation: Jockey

Horse racing career
- Sport: Horse racing
- Career wins: Not found

Major racing wins
- Hawthorne Gold Cup (1937); Futurity Stakes (1939); Hopeful Stakes (1939); Pimlico Futurity (1939); Metropolitan Handicap (1939); Sanford Stakes (1939); Saratoga Special Stakes (1939); Blue Grass Stakes (1940); Derby Trial Stakes (1940); Phoenix Handicap (1940); Arlington Handicap (1942); Stars and Stripes Handicap (1942); Equipoise Mile (1943, 1945); Lincoln Handicap (1943, 1945, 1948, 1949); Keeneland Special (1947); Modesty Handicap (1949); Arlington Matron Stakes (1949); San Pasqual Handicap (1951) American Classic Race wins: Preakness Stakes (1940); Belmont Stakes (1940)

Racing awards
- Leading jockey at Arlington Park (1940)

Significant horses
- Bimelech, Brolite, Rounders

Fred A. Smith (c. 1913 – June 28, 1951) was a Cuban American jockey in Thoroughbred horse racing best remembered for narrowly missing victory in the 1940 U.S. Triple Crown.

Born in Camagüey, Cuba, Freddy Smith rode and won at racetracks across the United States. He had his best years in 1939 and 1940. Although he won the 1939 Metropolitan Handicap aboard Joseph Widener's colt, Knickerbocker, he had the greatest success of his career that same year riding Col. Edward Bradley's future Hall of Fame colt, Bimelech. Smith was the leading jockey at Chicago's Arlington Park in 1940, and in 1942 won the Arlington Handicap aboard Rounders, defeating 1941 Triple Crown winner, Whirlaway.

== 1940 Triple Crown ==
Freddy Smith rode Bimelech to American Champion Two-Year-Old Colt honors in 1939, winning the Saratoga Special Stakes, the Hopeful Stakes and both the Belmont and Pimlico Futuritys. In Bimelech's three-year-old season, Smith guided the colt to victory in the 1940 Blue Grass Stakes and Derby Trial Stakes but after bettors made them the overwhelming favorite, they finished second in the 1940 Kentucky Derby. Smith was criticized for his riding and admitted he had made a tactical mistake that may have caused the loss. Smith and Bimelech went on to easily win the Preakness and Belmont Stakes and the colt was voted 1940's American Champion Three-Year-Old Male Horse.

During the 1940s, Freddy Smith won other important races but on June 28, 1951, the thirty-eight-year-old jockey died after he was thrown from his horse in the eighth race at Hollywood Park Racetrack in Inglewood, California.
