= Sidney Port =

American lawyer

Sidney L. Port
- Born: March 7, 1911; Chicago, Illinois, U.S.
- Died: June 11, 2007 (aged 96); Chicago, Illinois, U.S.

Sidney L. Port, (March 7, 1911 – June 11, 2007) was a philanthropist, a lawyer and high school and college basketball player. Port grew up in his father's downtown Chicago hotel, Antlers Hotel, at Clark and Lake Street. He started an industrial repair and maintenance parts company called Lawson Products in 1952.

== High school ==
A native of Chicago, Illinois, Port attended Lane Tech High School from 1924 to 1928. He played basketball and was a center who led the Indians to an overall record of 29 wins, 15 losses in his four years.

== College ==
Port chose to play basketball at the University of Illinois at Urbana-Champaign after high school. He spent his first season on the freshman team, moving to the varsity squad as a sophomore. However, he only played in 7 of the 35 games during the next two years as an Illini and decided to focus on his studies as a senior.

After graduating from Illinois in 1933, Port continued his education at DePaul University, receiving a law degree.

== Professional career and later life ==
After deciding he could not make enough money as a lawyer, Port joined his father-in-law's business, Lion Auto Parts. He rose to executive vice president and then started Lawson Products. As of 2015, the company sells and distributes more than 300,000 specialized parts, systems and services to industrial clients. Lawson Products, which is headquartered in Chicago, Illinois, was named after Victor Lawson, owner of the Chicago Daily News and a philanthropist whom Port admired.

Lawson Products grew steadily and in 1970 went public, a move that allowed Port to focus more time on philanthropic efforts. Port was able to give millions to hospitals, schools and arts organizations.

Port donated approximately $5 million to the University of Illinois at Chicago, where four student and faculty centers carry the Port name. Among them are the Rebecca Port Student Center & Cafe, the Sandi Port Errant Language and Culture Learning Center, the Port Academic Center in the Department of Intercollegiate Athletics and the Sidney L. Port Hall of Excellence. He also served as a trustee of Shimer College.

Port underwrote productions at the Lyric Opera. He was a major donor to the Art Institute of Chicago and the Joffrey Ballet; Mt. Sinai Hospital and the Gastro-Intestinal Research Foundation at the University of Chicago. He also supported many Jewish organizations in Chicago and Palm Springs, his winter home for years. He contributed to a wide range of political campaigns. Beneficiaries included former Governor George Ryan and former Cook County Board President John Stroger and most significantly, Mayor Richard M. Daley.

== Thoroughbred racing ==
Port began buying horses in the 1970s, and his partners included the legendary trainer Charlie Whittingham. At his peak, Port owned about 200 horses. He was a regular at Arlington Park racetrack in Arlington Heights, Illinois and at Santa Anita Park in Arcadia, California during his stays in Palm Springs.

Port's wife, Bettie, died in 1998. They had been married since 1938.
