= Craig Perret =

American jockey (born 1951)

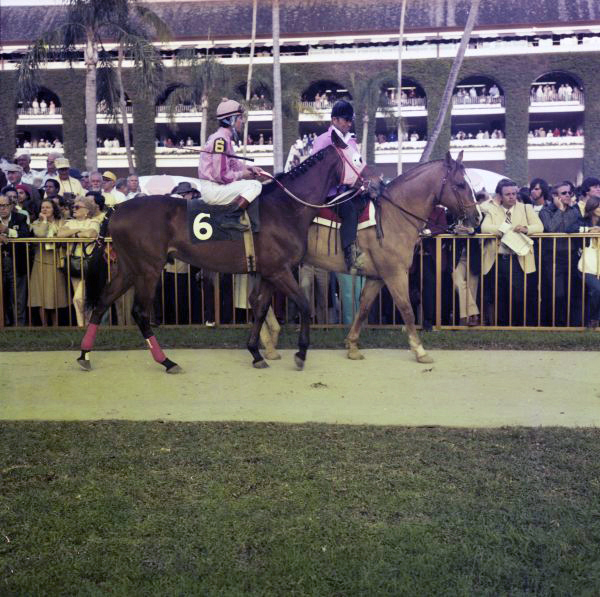
- Perret with "Brach's Hilarious" at Hialeah, February 25, 1978

Personal information
- Born: February 2, 1951 (age 75) New Orleans, Louisiana, U.S.
- Occupation: Jockey

Horse racing career
- Sport: Horse racing
- Career wins: 4,415

Major racing wins
- Gazelle Handicap (1968); Arlington-Washington Futurity (1971, 1986); Palm Beach Handicap (1972); Louisiana Handicap (1974, 1976); Eatontown Handicap (1975, 1986); Lamplighter Handicap (1975, 1976, 1986, 1987, 1988); Flamingo Stakes (1976); Lexington Handicap (1976); Spinster Stakes (1976); Travers Stakes (1976, 1990); Vosburgh Stakes (1977, 1991); Florida Derby (1977); Haskell Invitational Handicap (1981, 1987, 1991); Fashion Stakes (1983); Royal Palm Handicap (1985); Laurel Futurity (1986, 1989); Spectacular Bid Stakes (1986, 1990); Acorn Stakes (1987); Black-Eyed Susan Stakes (1987, 1990); Pimlico Special (1988, 1992); Vagrancy Handicap (1988); American Derby (1989); Monmouth Oaks (1989, 1994); Old Hat Stakes (1989); Coaching Club American Oaks (1990); Jerome Handicap (1990); Withers Stakes (1990, 1993); Carter Handicap (1991, 1993); Dwyer Stakes (1991); Frizette Stakes (1991); Wood Memorial Stakes (1991); Morris Handicap (1992); Cowdin Stakes (1993); Molson Million (1993); Bourbon Stakes (1996, 1997, 2004); Edgewood Stakes (1996); Hopeful Stakes (1996); Stars and Stripes Handicap (1996); Black Gold Stakes (1997); Saranac Handicap (1997); Clark Handicap (2001) Canadian Classic Race wins: Queen's Plate (1992, 1993); Prince of Wales Stakes (1994) American Classics / Breeders' Cup wins: Belmont Stakes (1987); Kentucky Derby (1990); Breeders' Cup Sprint (1984, 1990); Breeders' Cup Juvenile (1989); Breeders' Cup Juvenile Fillies (1996)

Racing awards
- U.S. Champion Apprentice Jockey by earnings (1967); Eclipse Award for Outstanding Jockey (1990); George Woolf Memorial Jockey Award (1998)

Honors
- Fair Grounds Racing Hall of Fame (1994); Louisiana Sports Hall of Fame (2006); National Museum of Racing and Hall of Fame (2019)

Significant horses
- Honest Pleasure, Bet Twice, Unbridled; Strike the Gold, Alydeed, Peteski; Forty Niner, Rhythm, Pine Bluff, With Approval
- Updated on August 3, 2020

Craig Perret (born February 2, 1951) is an American Thoroughbred horse racing jockey. He began riding horses at age five and by seven years old, he was riding quarter horses in match races. At age fifteen he began his career in thoroughbred racing and in 1967 was the leading apprentice jockey in the United States in terms of money won.

In 1987 Perret rode Bet Twice to victory in the Belmont Stakes. In 1990, aboard Unbridled, he won the Kentucky Derby, and in 1993-94 won back-to-back Queen's Plates, Canada's most prestigious race. In addition, Perret won the Breeders' Cup Sprint in 1984 and 1990; the Breeders' Cup Juvenile in 1989; and the Breeders' Cup Juvenile Fillies in 1996. Of his more than 4,400 career victories to date, he has also had major stakes race wins including the Florida Derby, Acorn Stakes, Pimlico Special, Travers Stakes, Haskell Invitational Handicap and the Wood Memorial Stakes.

He has earned a number of other accolades including the 1990 Eclipse Award for Outstanding Jockey of the year, and in 1998 his peers voted him the George Woolf Memorial Jockey Award.

Craig Perret and his family live on a farm in Shelbyville, Kentucky and operate a small full-breed breeding operation.

In 1994, Craig Perret was inducted into the Fair Grounds Racing Hall of Fame and in 2006 into the Louisiana Sports Hall of Fame. In 2006 he was also nominated for induction in the National Museum of Racing and Hall of Fame, and was officially inducted in 2019.
