= Mahan (horse) =

British-bred Thoroughbred racehorse

- Sire: Avenger
- Grandsire: Victrix
- Dam: Sans Tares
- Damsire: Sind
- Sex: Stallion
- Foaled: 1951
- Country: Great Britain
- Colour: Chestnut
- Breeder: Ralph B. Strassburger
- Owner: 1) Ralph B. Strassburger (France); 2) Hasty House Farm (United States)
- Trainer: 1) Georges Bridgland (France); 2) Harry Trotsek (United States)
- Record: 73: 15-9-6
- Earnings: ₣13,104,300 & US$212,779

Major wins
- Prix d'Harcourt (1955); Prix du Conseil de Paris (1955); Prix de Barbeville (1955); Arch Ward Handicap (1956); Turf Cup Stakes (1957); Washington, D.C. International Stakes (1957)

Mahan (foaled 1951 in England) was a Thoroughbred racehorse who competed successfully in France for his American owner/breeder Ralph B. Strassburger before being sold to Allie E. Reuben's Hasty House Farm and brought to race in the United States.

Trained by U.S. Racing Hall of Fame inductee Harry Trotsek, Mahan defeated the great Swaps to win the Arch Ward Handicap at Washington Park Race Track in Chicago.

In 1957, Mahan won the most important race of his career when he captured the Washington, D.C. International Stakes, a race that was the precursor to the Breeders' Cup.

Mahan was not successful at stud.
