= Johnny Sellers =

American jockey (1937–2010)

Personal information
- Born: July 31, 1937 Los Angeles, California, U.S.
- Died: July 3, 2010 (aged 72) Fayetteville, Arkansas, U.S.
- Occupation: Jockey

Horse racing career
- Sport: Horse racing
- Career wins: 2,787

Major racing wins
- Washington Park Handicap (1958, 1960); Palm Beach Handicap (1959); American Derby (1960); Arlington Classic (1960); Remsen Stakes (1960); United Nations Handicap (1960); Florida Derby (1961); Jerome Handicap (1961); Round Table Handicap (1961); Royal Palm Handicap (1961, 1963); Stars and Stripes Handicap (1961); Alabama Stakes (1962); Monmouth Oaks (1962); Carter Handicap (1962); Saratoga Special Stakes (1962); Test Stakes (1962); Whitney Handicap (1962); Adirondack Stakes (1963); Diana Handicap (1963); Lexington Handicap (1963); Excelsior Breeders' Cup Handicap (1964); Brooklyn Handicap (1965); Great American Stakes (1965); Juvenile Stakes (1965); Ladies Handicap (1965); Suburban Handicap (1965); Travers Stakes (1965); Kentucky Oaks (1967); Blue Grass Stakes (1967); Hollywood Derby (1967); Frank E. Kilroe Mile (1968, 1971); Hollywood Lassie Stakes (1968); San Gorgonio Handicap (1968); Highlander Handicap (1969); San Juan Capistrano Handicap (1969); San Luis Obispo Handicap (1968, 1971); San Pasqual Handicap (1968); Del Mar Handicap (1970); Strub Stakes (1971, 1973); Del Mar Oaks (1972); El Encino Stakes (1972); San Felipe Stakes (1972) American Classic Race wins: Kentucky Derby (1961); Preakness Stakes (1961); Belmont Stakes (1965) International race wins: Canadian International Stakes (1958); Woodbine Oaks Stakes (1969)

Racing awards
- United States Champion Jockey by wins (1961); George Woolf Memorial Jockey Award (1969)

Honors
- United States' Racing Hall of Fame (2007); Oklahoma Horse Racing Hall of Fame (2011)

Significant horses
- T. V. Lark, Carry Back, Hail To All, Cool Reception
- Updated on April 1, 2007

Johnny Sellers (July 31, 1937 – July 3, 2010) was an American National Champion jockey. Born in Los Angeles, but raised in Oklahoma, he began his professional career in 1955 and between 1959 and 1968 rode in six Kentucky Derbys. He won the prestigious race aboard Carry Back in 1961 then riding the colt to victory in the Preakness Stakes. That same year, he won eight straight races, equaling an American record set in 1951, and ended the year as the United States Champion Jockey by wins. He made the August 28, 1961, cover of Sports Illustrated magazine.

In 1958, Sellers rode Jack Ketch to victory in the Canadian International Stakes and in 1965 he won the Belmont Stakes aboard Hail To All. In 1969, he was voted the George Woolf Memorial Jockey Award.

Retired in 1997, Sellers lived in Hallandale, Florida, two blocks from Gulfstream Park racetrack. He remained involved in the racing industry as a bloodstock agent. In 1999, he was in the news after recovering his Kentucky Derby trophy. Stolen from his Monrovia, California, home in 1978, twenty-one years later a friend notified him that the engraved sterling silver trophy was being offered for sale on eBay.

In 2007, Johnny Sellers was elected to the United States' Racing Hall of Fame. In 2011, he was inducted into the Oklahoma Horse Racing Hall of Fame.

Johnny Sellers died on July 3, 2010, at age 72 in Fayetteville, Arkansas. He had two sons, Mark Sellers and John Michael Sellers, both of whom had careers as jockeys. He also had a daughter, Sabrina Sellers Machado. His parents were John “Bud” Sellers and Mary Pauline Roe Sellers. He had five siblings, two older brothers, Jimmy Sellers and Billy Rex Sellers, two older sisters, Ruth Anne Sellers and Virginia Lee Sellers Martin and a younger sister whom died shortly after birth.

After finishing seventh at the Belmont Stakes with Carry Back, he was a Mystery Guest on What's My Line with Arlene Francis, Joey Bishop, Dorothy Kilgallen, and Bennett Cerf on the panel. Sellers won $10 for stumping Cerf and Francis; Joey Bishop successfully guessed his identity.
