= Adele L. Rand =

American thoroughbred racehorse owner (1899 – 1994)

- Born: Adele Louise Levis; August 23, 1899; Alton, Illinois, U.S.
- Died: July 8, 1994 (aged 94); New York, New York, U.S.
- Occupations: Racehorse owner and philanthropist
- Known for: O-I Glass, Inc. heiress and socialite
- Spouses: John M. Olin (1917-divorce); Frank Chambless Rand Jr. (1938-1975 his death)
- Children: 3
- Relatives: Frank C. Rand (father-in-law)

Adele Louise Levis Olin Rand (August 23, 1889 – July 8, 1994) was a philanthropist and thoroughbred horse owner. From her start in the racing industry in the 1950s, her horses would produce stakes wins until her death in the 1990s.

== Biography ==
Adele Louise Levis was born August 23, 1899, to George M. Levis and Emma Gray. She was the granddaughter of Edward Levis, the co-founder of Illinois Glass Company (today O-I Glass, Inc.). She grew up in Alton, Illinois where her father managed the family's glass company.

In 1917, Adele Levis married manufacturer and philanthropist John Merrill Olin. The couple shared three daughters, Joan, Adele and Georgene. Joan would die at age five, and the marriage would end in divorce.

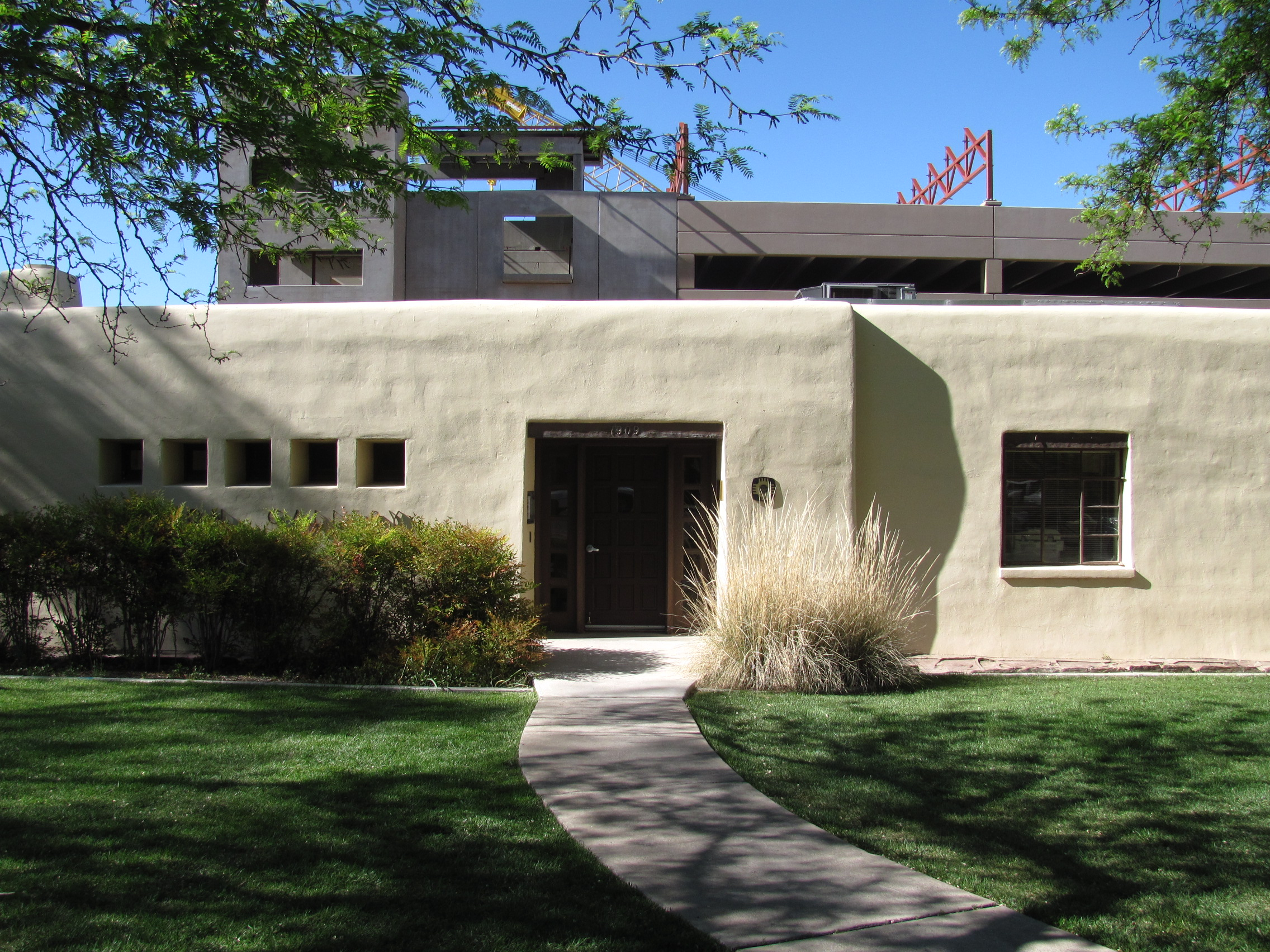
The Jonson Gallery in Albuquerque, which Adele Rand and her husband Frank donated to develop.

=== New Mexico ===
In 1938, Rand married Frank Chambless Rand Jr. (son of Frank C. Rand). In the 1940s, Adele Rand moved to Santa Fe, New Mexico, where her husband Frank became president of the Turf and Field Club and published The New Mexican, the state's only daily newspaper. In New Mexico, the Rands established themselves as philanthropists, giving to the University of New Mexico to support the development of the Jonson Gallery, which would become the first art museum in Albuquerque, New Mexico.

=== Horse racing ===
In 1951, Rand and her husband became involved in thoroughbred racing. She owned a number of horses that would become stakes winners including Clem, Traffic Cop, Green Ticket, Call Me Prince, Three Engines, Red Shoes, and I'm A Thriller. Adele and her husband Frank kept their thoroughbred interests separate, maintaining competing racing stables in Santa Fe, New Mexico.

Rand's horses would race in some of the most significant races of the day, including the 1958 Belmont Stakes and 1960 Kentucky Derby, where her Bourbon Prince placed fifth. Rand utilized a number of race horse trainers throughout her years of racing, including William Ward Stephens (trainer of Clem), and Max Hirsch (trainer of Call Me Prince).

=== Later life ===
After her husband's death in 1975, Adele continued to reside in New Mexico and be involved in horse racing. Rand was buying race horses as late as 1989, when she was 90 years old.

Rand died in New York on July 8, 1994. Her granddaughter, Adele B. Dilschneider, continued in her grandmother's footsteps as a racehorse owner, co-owning a number of prominent winners, including 2010 Breeder's Cup Classic winner Blame.

== Stakes wins ==
- 1957 Shevlin Stakes, Clem
- 1957 Arlington Classic, Clem
- 1958 Woodward Stakes, Clem
- 1958 United Nations Stakes, Clem
- 1958 Washington Park Handicap, Clem
- 1959 Palm Beach Handicap, Clem
- 1961 Playground Stakes, Green Ticket
- 1962 Suffolk Downs Stakes, Green Ticket
- 1962 Lamplighter Stakes, Green Ticket
- 1968 Withers Stakes, Call Me Prince
- 1972 Bed O Roses Handicap, Red Shoes
- 1973 Royal Palm Handicap, Traffic Cop
- 1979 Personal Ensign Stakes, Catherine's Bet
- 1982 Forty Niner Stakes, Worthy Too
- 1989 Tidal Handicap, Three Engines
- 1991 Busher Stakes, I'm A Thriller
