= Palm Beach Handicap =

American Grade III Thoroughbred horse race

- Class: Discontinued Grade III Stakes
- Location: Hialeah Park Race Track; Hialeah, Florida, United States
- Inaugurated: 1937
- Race type: Thoroughbred - Flat racing

Race information
- Distance: 1 1/16 miles (8.5 furlongs)
- Surface: Turf
- Track: Grass, left-handed
- Qualification: Three-years-old & up
- Weight: Handicap

The Palm Beach Handicap is a discontinued American Grade 3 Thoroughbred horse race run between 1937 and 1976 at Hialeah Park Race Track in Hialeah, Florida. Open to horses aged three and older, from inception through 1965 it was run on dirt after which it became a race on turf.

== Historical notes ==
First run on February 27, 1937, the race was won by Calumet Farm's Count Morse with jockey Irving Anderson aboard. Following that inaugural running, the Palm Beach Handicap was not held again until 1941, a year frequently reported as its first edition. The final running took place on January 21, 1976 and was won by Sea Lawyer who was ridden by Gerland Gallitano for the Shore View Farm partnership of three Florida medical doctors.

== Records ==
Speed record:

- 1:39.80 @ 1-1/16 miles on turf : Star Envoy (1972)
- 1:22.00 @ 7 furlongs on dirt: Crafty Admiral (1952) & Pointer (1960)

Most wins:

- 2 - Switch On (1956, 1957)
- 2 - Point du Jour (1966, 1967)

Most wins by a jockey:

- 4 - Ron Turcotte (1966, 1967, 1969, 1970)

Most wins by a trainer:

- 4 - John A. Nerud (1956, 1957, 1962, 1964)

Most wins by an owner:

- 2 - Calumet Farm (1937, 1941)
- 2 - Greentree Stable (1944, 1949)
- 2 - Hasty House Farm (1953, 1973)
- 2 - Edith Baily Dent (1966, 1967)
- 2 - Emanuel Mittman (1969, 1970)

== Winners ==
Year	Winner	Age	Jockey	Trainer	Owner	Dist. (Miles)	Time	Win $	Gr.
1976	Sea Lawyer	6	Gerland Gallitano	Kenneth O. Kemp	Shore View Farm Inc.	1-1/16 m (t)	1:41.60	$20,800	G3
1975	Buffalo Lark	5	Ruben Hernandez	Joseph M. Bollero	Rogers Red Top Farm (Walter F. Mullady)	1-1/16 m (t)	1:41.00	$21,645	G3
1974	Take Off	5	Ruben Hernandez	Frank Catrone	Ada L. Rice	1-1/16 m (t)	1:41.60		G3
1973	Unanime	6	Jorge Velasquez	Harry Trotsek	Hasty House Farm	1-1/16 m (t)	1:42.20	$22,197	G3
1972-1	Joe Gaylord	5	Craig Perret	Arnold N. Winick	Maribel G. Blum	1-1/16 m (t)	1:41.00		
1972-2	Star Envoy	4	Jacinto Vasquez	Everett W. King	Lloyd I. Miller	1-1/16 m (t)	1:39.80		
1971-1	Drumtop	5	Chuck Baltazar	Roger Laurin	James B. Moseley	1-1/16 m (t)	1:41.40	$17,306	
1971-2	Mongo's Pride	4	Carlos Marquez Sr.	Don Combs	Mrs. Russell L. Reineman	1-1/16 m (t)	1:42.00	$17,306	
1970	Vent du Nord	4	Ron Turcotte	Alfred A. Scotti	Emanuel Mittman	1-1/16 m (t)	1:41.00	$20,897	
1969-1	Needles Stitch	5	John L. Rotz	Freeman E. McMillan	Robert Braunsdorf & Robert Levine	1-1/16 m (t)	1:43.60	$16,656	
1969-2	Doon	4	Ron Turcotte	Alfred A. Scotti	Emanuel Mittman	1-1/16 m (t)	1:43.20	$16,656	
1968-1	Abe's Hope	5	Braulio Baeza	Del W. Carroll	Grand Prix Stable (Joseph Bartell & Robert Byfield)	1-1/16 m (t)	1:44.00	$17,680	
1968-2	Polyfoto	6	Angel Cordero Jr.	Michael F. Fogarty	Patrick C. Rowe	1-1/16 m (t)	1:42.80	$17,355	
1967-1	Point du Jour	6	Ron Turcotte	Nick Combest	Edith Baily Dent	1-1/16 m (t)	1:46.20	$17,420	
1967-2	Third Martini	8	Ernest Cardone	H. Allen Jerkens	Hobeau Farm	1-1/16 m (t)	1:45.80	$17,582	
1966-1	First Family	4	Larry Adams	Casey Hayes	Meadow Stable	1-1/16 m (t)	1:42.60	$18,135	
1966-2	Point du Jour	5	Ron Turcotte	Nick Combest	Edith Baily Dent	1-1/16 m (t)	1:46.20	$18,135	
1965	Lt. Stevens	4	Tommy Barrow	Charles P. Sanborn	Ernest Woods	7 f (d)	1:24.00	$19,890	
1964	Rainy Lake	5	Bobby Ussery	John A. Nerud	Joseph M. Roebling	7 f (d)	1:23.00	$20,962	
1963	Ridan	4	Steve Brooks	LeRoy Jolley	Dorothy Jolley, Ernest Woods, John L. Greer	7 f (d)	1:22.80	$19,240	
1962	Intentionally	6	Bobby Ussery	John A. Nerud	Tartan Stable	7 f (d)	1:22.60	$21,742	
1961	April Skies	4	Heriberto Hinojosa	Gene W. Semler	Jerome DeRenzo	7 f (d)	1:23.00	$19,272	
1960	Pointer	4	Walter Blum	Ira G. Hanford	Loren P. Guy	7 f (d)	1:22.00	$15,841	
1959	Clem	5	Johnny Sellers	William W. Stephens	Adele L. Rand	7 f (d)	1:23.20	$16,068	
1958	Encore	4	Sam Boulmetis	J. Elliott Burch	Brookmeade Stable	7 f (d)	1:23.80	$15,775	
1957	Switch On	6	Sam Boulmetis	John A. Nerud	Formella Stables (James Forma & Gerald S. Colella)	7 f (d)	1:24.20	$20,750	
1956	Switch On	5	Bobby Ussery	John A. Nerud	Gerald S. Colella	7 f (d)	1:24.00	$19,175	
1955	Blessbull	4	John H. Skelly	Herbert E. Lewis	Maurice Sims	6 f (d)	1:09.40	$14,975	
1954	Impasse	4	James D. Nichols	Francis J. Scott	Valley Farm (L. Larry Katz)	7 f (d)	1:24.00	$14,725	
1953	Oil Capitol	6	Conn McCreary	Harry Trotsek	Hasty House Farm	7 f (d)	1:24.40	$14,500	
1952	Crafty Admiral	4	Con Errico	Robert B. Odom	Charfran Stable (Charles & Frances Cohen)	7 f (d)	1:22.00	$9,500	
1951	American Glory	5	Kenneth Church	Thomas J. Carroll	Cross Bell Ranch	7 f (d)	1:23.80	$7,295	
1950	Nell K	4	Warren Mehrtens	John B. Partridge	Spring Hill Farm	7 f (d)	1:22.80	$6,935	
1949	Blue Border	5	Ted Atkinson	George T. Poole	Greentree Stable	7 f (d)	1:23.00	$9,100	
1948	Delegate	4	Ted Atkinson	Ross O. Higdon	Woolford Farm	7 f (d)	1:24.40	$7,950	
1947	The Shaker	4	Carson Kirk	Charles V. Gribbin	Samuel D. Riddle	7 f (d)	1:23.40	$8,500	
1946-1	Happy Buckie	4	Lawrence Hansman	Charles M. Feltner	Gustave Ring	7 f (d)	1:23.20	$8,925	
1946-2	Buzfuz	4	Eddie Arcaro	Joseph B. Rosen	Sunshine Stable (Dan Chappell & Moze Rauzin)	7 f (d)	1:22.80	$8,550	
1945	Race not held								
1944-1	Four Freedoms	4	Eddie Arcaro	John M. Gaver Sr.	Greentree Stable	7 f (d)	1:26.40	$4,040	
1944-2	Old Grad	5	Mike Caffarella		Canupet Stable	7 f (d)	1:28.80	$4,140	
1943	Race not held								
1942	Get Off	6	Basil James	William B. Finnegan	Edward S. Moore	7 f (d)	1:25.20	$4,990	
1941	Beau James	5	Wendell Eads	Ben A. Jones	Calumet Farm	7 f (d)	1:26.00	$4,490	
1938	1940	Race not held							
1937	Count Morse	4	Irving Anderson	Frank J. Kearns	Calumet Farm	1 m (d)	1:36.00		
