= Cowdin Stakes =

American horse race

- Class: Discontinued stakes
- Location: Belmont Park; Elmont, New York, USA
- Inaugurated: 1923
- Race type: Thoroughbred – Flat racing

Race information
- Distance: 6.5 furlongs
- Track: Dirt, left-handed
- Qualification: Two-years-old
- Weight: Assigned
- Purse: US$

The Cowdin Stakes was an American Thoroughbred horse race held annually from 1923 through 2005 at Aqueduct Racetrack and at Belmont Park which at one time was a Grade 1 event.

== Background ==
The Cowdin was first run in 1923 as the Junior Champion Stakes, a name taken from a very important race for two-year-olds which had been inaugurated in 1898 at Gravesend Race Track. The Junior Champion Stakes at Gravesend ended with the 1908 running when the racetrack was forced to close after the administration of Republican Governor Charles Evans Hughes signed into law the Hart–Agnew bill which effectively banned all racetrack wagering in New York State. The new Junior Champion Stakes at Aqueduct Racetrack was renamed the Cowdin Stakes in 1941 to honor John Cheever Cowdin, former president of the racetrack.

At its peak, the Cowdin Stakes was one of the important East Coast races for two-year-olds, a number of which would earn American Champion Two-Year-Old Colt honors. As well, 1929 winner Gallant Fox went on to win the 1930 U.S. Triple Crown and would be inducted into the U. S. Racing Hall of Fame. Other winners who would become Hall of Fame members were Twenty Grand (1930), Hill Prince (1949), Dr. Fager (1966), Foolish Pleasure (1974), Easy Goer (1988).

The race was split into two divisions in 1963, 1973, and 1976.

The Cowdin Stakes was held at:

- Aqueduct Racetrack : 1923–1956, 1959, 1962–1967, 1991–1997
- Belmont Park : 1956 to 1958, 1960 to 1962, from 1968 to 1990, 1998 to 2005

== Records ==
Speed record:

- 1:14.35 @ 6.5 furlongs – Coronado's Quest (1997)
- 1:21.40 @ 7 furlongs – Devil's Bag (1983)
- 1:36.60 @ 1 mile (8 furlongs) – Sailor Beware (1934) & Chief's Crown (1984)

Most wins by a jockey:

- 5 – Jorge Velásquez (1971, 1975, 1977, 1980, 1985)

Most wins by a trainer:

- 6 – James E. Fitzsimmons (1926, 1927, 1929, 1931, 1939, 1940)
- 6 – Woody Stephens (1950, 1962, 1976, 1977, 1982, 1983)

Most wins by an owner:

- 3 – Wheatley Stable (1927, 1939, 1968)
- 3 – Greentree Stable (1930, 1933, 1934)
- 3 – Ogden Phipps (1940, 1986, 1988)

== Winners ==
Year	Winner	Age	Jockey	Trainer	Owner	Dist. (Furlongs/ Miles)	Time	Gr.
2005	He's Got Grit	2	Jerry Bailey	Steve Asmussen	Curtis C. Green	6.5 f	1:17.75	L/R
2004	Flamenco	2	Jerry Bailey	Todd Pletcher	Peachtree Stable (John Fort)	6.5 f	1:17.20	L/R
2003	Smokume	2	Shannon Uske	H. Allen Jerkens	Hobeau Farm	6.5 f	1:17.05	L/R
2002	Boston Bull	2	John Velazquez	Todd Pletcher	Dogwood Stable	6.5 f	1:16.37	G3
2001	Sunray Spirit	2	Eibar Coa	Eoin G. Harty	Godolphin	6.5 f	1:19.16	G3
2000	Fistfite	2	Richard Migliore	William Badgett Jr.	Peter Callahan	6.5 f	1:15.63	G3
1999	Twilight Time	2	Mike Luzzi	Linda L. Rice	Char-Mari Stable (Charles & Marianne Hesse)	6.5 f	1:17.00	G2
1998	Successful Appeal	2	Richard Migliore	John C. Kimmel	Starview Stable (racing partnership)	6.5 f	1:17.11	G2
1997	Coronado's Quest	2	Mike E. Smith	C. R. McGaughey III	Stuart S. Janney III	6.5 f	1:14.35	G2
1996	Just A Cat	2	Joe Bravo	James T. Ryerson	Noreen Carpenito	7 f	1:23.00	G2
1995	Gator Dancer	2	Eddie Maple	Patrick J. Kelly	Fox Ridge Farm, Inc. (Rick Porter)	1 m	1:37.09	G2
1994	Old Tascosa	2	Carlos Lopez Jr.	Walter C. Reese	Noreen Carpenito	7 f	1:24.60	G2
1993	You And I	2	Craig Perret	Stanley M. Hough	Triumviri Stable (E. Paul Robsham)	7 f	1:22.60	G2
1992	Wallenda	2	Herb McCauley	Frank A. Alexander	Dogwood Stable	7 f	1:24.00	G2
1991	Salt Lake	2	Mike E. Smith	D. Wayne Lukas	William T. Young	7 f	1:22.60	G2
1990	Scan	2	Jerry Bailey	Flint S. Schulhofer	William Haggin Perry	7 f	1:23.40	G2
1989	Adjudicating	2	Jacinto Vásquez	C. R. McGaughey III	Ogden Mills Phipps	7 f	1:23.60	G1
1988	Easy Goer	2	Pat Day	C. R. McGaughey III	Ogden Phipps	7 f	1:23.60	G1
1987	Tejano	2	Jacinto Vásquez	D. Wayne Lukas	Lloyd R. French Jr.	7 f	1:23.40	G1
1986	Polish Navy	2	Randy Romero	C. R. McGaughey III	Ogden Phipps	7 f	1:22.80	G1
1985	Ketoh	2	Jorge Velásquez	D. Wayne Lukas	Helen C. Alexander	7 f	1:23.80	G1
1984	Chief's Crown	2	Don MacBeth	Roger Laurin	Star Crown Stable (Andrew Rosen, et al.)	1 m	1:36.60	G1
1983	Devil's Bag	2	Eddie Maple	Woody Stephens	Hickory Tree Stable	7 f	1:21.40	G2
1982	What's Dat	2	Eddie Maple	Woody Stephens	Hickory Tree Stable	7 f	1:24.40	G2
1981	Native Raja	2	Chris McCarron	Joseph S. Nash	Grandview Stable (Harry Massey)	7 f	1:23.80	G2
1980	Lord Avie	2	Jorge Velásquez	Daniel Perlsweig	David Simon	7 f	1:23.60	G2
1979	Rockhill Native	2	John Oldham	Herbert K. Stevens	Harry A. Oak	7 f	1:23.60	G2
1978	Tim The Tiger	2	Jeffrey Fell	John M. Veitch	Calumet Farm	7 f	1:22.60	G2
1977	Quadratic	2	Jorge Velásquez	Woody Stephens	August Belmont IV	7 f	1:24.60	G2
1976	Sail To Rome	2	Jeffrey Fell	Woody Stephens	Lucille Stephens	7 f	1:22.80	G2
1976	For The Moment	2	Eddie Maple	LeRoy Jolley	Gerald Robins	7 f	1:22.40	G2
1975	Honest Pleasure	2	Jorge Velásquez	LeRoy Jolley	Bertram R. Firestone	7 f	1:22.60	G2
1974	Foolish Pleasure	2	Jacinto Vásquez	LeRoy Jolley	John L. Greer	7 f	1:22.60	G2
1973-1	Protagonist	2	Angel Santiago	John P. Campo	Elmendorf Farm	7 f	1:23.00	G2
1973-2	Lord Rebeau	2	Heliodoro Gustines	William Hightower	Paul Cresci	7 f	1:22.80	G2
1972	Step Nicely	2	Ángel Cordero Jr.	H. Allen Jerkens	Hobeau Farm	7 f	1:22.60	
1971	Loquacious Don	2	Jorge Velásquez	John W. Jacobs	Nelson Bunker Hunt	7 f	1:24.20	
1970	Hoist The Flag	2	Jean Cruguet	Sidney Watters Jr.	Jane Forbes Clark	7 f	1:22.40	
1969	Silent Screen	2	John L. Rotz	J. Bowes Bond	Elberon Farm	7 f	1:23.80	
1968	King Emperor	2	Braulio Baeza	Edward A. Neloy	Wheatley Stable	7 f	1:22.60	
1967	Iron Ruler	2	Laffit Pincay Jr.	Edward J. Yowell	October House Farm	7 f	1:21.60	
1966	Dr. Fager	2	Bill Shoemaker	John A. Nerud	Tartan Stable	7 f	1:24.80	
1965	Advocator	2	Eldon Nelson	Clyde Troutt	Ada L. Rice	7 f	1:23.60	
1964	Tom Rolfe	2	Ron Turcotte	Frank Y. Whiteley Jr.	Powhatan Stable	7 f	1:23.80	
1963	Chieftain	2	Bill Hartack	Frank Y. Whiteley Jr.	Powhatan Stable	7 f	1:23.80	
1963	Dunfee	2	Ray Broussard	Joseph M. Bollero	Dorothy Comiskey Rigney	7 f	1:24.20	
1962	Never Bend	2	Manuel Ycaza	Woody Stephens	Cain Hoy Stable	7 f	1:23.20	
1961	Jaipur	2	Eddie Arcaro	Bert Mulholland	George D. Widener Jr.	7 f	1:22.60	
1960	Carry Back	2	Bill Hartack	Jack A. Price	Katherine Price	7 f	1:24.00	
1959	Warfare	2	Ismael Valenzuela	Hack Ross	Bellehurst Stable (Clifton Jones Jr.)	7 f	1:22.60	
1958	Crafty Skipper	2	Bobby Ussery	Lucien Laurin	Charfran Stable (Charles & Frances Cohen)	7 f	1:23.00	
1957	Jewel's Reward	2	Bill Hartack	Ivan H. Parke	Maine Chance Farm	6.5 f	1:17.60	
1956	Mister Jive	2	Hedley Woodhouse	George M. Carter	John L. Applebaum	6.5 f	1:17.20	
1955	Noorsaga*	2	Eric Guerin	Sherrill W. Ward	Mrs. C. Ulrick Bay	6.5 f	1:17.60	
1954	Summer Tan	2	Eric Guerin	Sherrill W. Ward	Dorothy Firestone Galbreath	6.5 f	1:16.00	
1953	Fisherman	2	Hedley Woodhouse	Sylvester Veitch	C. V. Whitney	6.5 f	1:17.00	
1952	Invigorator	2	Dave Gorman	Norman R. McLeod	Saxon Stable	6.5 f	1:17.60	
1951	Eternal Moon	2	Conn McCreary	Daverne Emery	Emerald Hill Stable	6.5 f	1:18.60	
1950	Away Away	2	Ovie Scurlock	Woody Stephens	Woodvale Farm	6.5 f	1:18.80	
1949	Hill Prince	2	Eddie Arcaro	Casey Hayes	Christopher Chenery	6.5 f	1:16.60	
1948	Algasir	2	Ted Atkinson	John H. Skirvin	Florence L. Clark	6.5 f	1:19.80	
1947	My Request	2	Eddie Arcaro	James P. Conway	Ben F. Whitaker	6.5 f	1:18.00	
1946	Cosmic Bomb	2	Ruperto Donoso	Willie Booth	William G. Helis Sr.	6.5 f	1:19.80	
1945	Knockdown	2	Douglas Dodson	R. Thomas Smith	Maine Chance Farm	6.5 f	1:18.00	
1944	Best Effort	2	Ted Atkinson	Ray Kindred	Claud C. Tanner	6.5 f	1:18.60	
1943	Alorter	2	John Deering	John H. Skirvin	Alwin C. Ernst	6.5 f	1:18.40	
1942	Slide Rule	2	Conn McCreary	Cecil Wilhelm	William E. Boeing	6.5 f	1:17.20	
1941	Requested	2	Jack Westrope	J. H. "Blackie" McCoole	Ben F. Whitaker	6.5 f	1:17.60	
1940	King Cole	2	James Stout	James E. Fitzsimmons	Ogden Phipps	6.5 f	1:17.00	
1939	Merry Knight	2	Ronnie Nash	James E. Fitzsimmons	Wheatley Stable	6.5 f	1:18.40	
1938	El Chico	2	Nick Wall	Matthew Peter Brady	William Ziegler Jr.	6.5 f	1:18.00	
1937	Can't Wait	2	Lester Balaski	J. Thomas Taylor	Myron Selznick	6.5 f	1:18.00	
1936	Pompoon	2	Harry Richards	Cyrus F. Clarke	Jerome H. Louchheim	6.5 f	1:18.20	
1935	Ned Reigh	2	Raymond Workman	Henry McDaniel	Willis Sharpe Kilmer	6.5 f	1:18.60	
1934	Sailor Beware	2	Raymond Workman	William Brennan	Greentree Stable	1 m	1:36.60	
1933	First Minstrel	2	Silvio Coucci	William Brennan	Greentree Stable	1 m	1:38.60	
1932	Repaid	2	Pete Walls	Edward Phelan	Quincy Stable (James Francis Johnson)	1 m	1:39.00	
1931	Faireno	2	Tommy Malley	James E. Fitzsimmons	Belair Stud	1 m	1:38.60	
1930	Twenty Grand	2	Charley Kurtsinger	Thomas W. Murphy	Greentree Stable	1 m	1:38.00	
1929	Gallant Fox	2	John Maiben	James E. Fitzsimmons	Belair Stud	1 m	1:38.00	
1928	Perkins	2	Harold Thurber	George M. Odom	Marshall Field III	1 m	1:39.00	
1927	Nixie	2	Phil Goodwin	James E. Fitzsimmons	Wheatley Stable	1 m	1:38.40	
1926	Bonnie Maginn	2	Danny McAuliffe	James E. Fitzsimmons	Belair Stud	1 m	1:42.20	
1925	Mars	2	Harry Richards	Robert A. Smith	Walter M. Jeffords Sr.	1 m	1:37.00	
1924	Star Lore	2	Clyde Ponce	William J. Spiers	William Ziegler Jr.	6.5 f	1:18.60	
1923	Mr. Mutt	2	Harold Thurber	Albert B. Gordon	Bud Fisher	1 m	1:38.80	

- In 1955, Busher Fantasy finished first, but was disqualified.
