= Shevlin Stakes =

- Class: Discontinued stakes
- Location: Aqueduct Racetrack; Queens, New York; United States 1925-1945, 1947-1955; Belmont Park Elmont, New York (1946, 1956-1959)
- Inaugurated: 1925
- Race type: Thoroughbred - Flat racing

Race information
- Distance: 1 mile : 1925-1939; 1 1/16 miles : 1940-1952; 7 furlongs : 1953-1959
- Surface: Dirt
- Track: Left-handed
- Qualification: Three-years-old
- Weight: Assigned

The Shevlin Stakes was an American Thoroughbred horse race for three-year-olds run at Aqueduct Racetrack in Queens, New York and at Belmont Park in Elmont, New York. The race on dirt was inaugurated in 1925 to honor the long service of James Shevlin, the President of the Queens County Jockey Club which operated Aqueduct Racetrack who had died at age 82 on November 24, 1924, at his home in Brooklyn.

There was no race run from 1933 through 1935.

== Records ==
Speed record:

- 1:36.80 - Volitant (1959) (1 mile)
- 1:42.80 - Jacomar (1940) (1 1/16 miles - race and track record)
- 1:22.40 - Clem - (7 furlongs)

Most wins by a jockey:

- 5 - Ted Atkinson (1943, 1944, 1945, 1947, 1950)

Most wins by a trainer:

- 5 - James E. Fitzsimmons (1931, 1932, 1941, 1952, 1954)

Most wins by an owner:

- 3 - Belair Stud (1931, 1932, 1952)

== Winners ==
Year	Winner	Jockey	Trainer	Owner	Time
1959	Cedar Brook	Jack Leonard	Clyde Troutt	Ada L. Rice	1:23.80
1958	Judge	Ismael Valenzuela	Clyde Troutt	Ada L. Rice	1:23.00
1957	Clem	Conn McCreary	William W. Stephens	Adele L. Rand	1:22.40
1956	Tick Tock	William Boland	Edward A. Christmas	Howell E. Jackson III	1:23.80
1955	Gold Box	Ted Atkinson	John M. Gaver Sr.	Greentree Stable	1:23.40
1954	Quick Lunch	Sidney Cole	James E. Fitzsimmons	Wheatley Stable	1:23.60
1953	Hueso	Basil James	Sidney Jacobs	Robert P. Levy	1:23.80
1952	Golden Gloves	Nick Wall	James E. Fitzsimmons	Belair Stud	1:44.20
1951	Battlefield	Ovie Scurlock	Winbert F. Mulholland	George D. Widener Jr.	1:43.60
1950	Dooly	Ted Atkinson	Sylvester Veitch	C. V. Whitney	1:46.20
1949	Colonel Mike	Eddie Arcaro	Eugene Jacobs	Eugene Jacobs	1:45.20
1948	My Request	Eddie Arcaro	James P. Conway	Ben F. Whitaker	1:45.80
1947	Blue Border	Ted Atkinson	John M. Gaver Sr.	Greentree Stable	1:46.20
1946	Hadrian	Ferril Zufelt	Sarge Swenke	Frank Frankel	1:44.00
1945	Wildlife	Ted Atkinson	Andy Schuttinger	Joseph M. Roebling	1:45.80
1944	By Jimminy	Ted Atkinson	James W. Smith	Alfred P. Parker	1:45.40
1943	Le Havre	Ted Atkinson	Thomas W. Murphy	Helen Murphy	1:45.00
1942	Dogpatch	Albert Schmidl	Roy Waldron	Milky Way Farm Stable	1:44.40
1941	King Cole	John Gilbert	James E. Fitzsimmons	Ogden Phipps	1:44.20
1940	Jacomar	Irving Anderson	H. Hugh Dufford	Elizabeth Arden	1:42.80
1939	Volitant	Don Meade	A. J. Goldsborough	George Bull & John Morris	1:36.80
1938	Mythical King	Kenneth McCombs	Jack Howard	Ben F. Whitaker	1:37.40
1937	Rudie	Eddie Arcaro	J. L. Donovan	William H. Gallagher	1:38.80
1936	Gean Canach	Sam Renick	Robert A. Smith	Brookmeade Stable	1:37.60
1935	no race				
1934	no race				
1933	no race				
1932	Faireno	Hank Mills	James E. Fitzsimmons	Belair Stud	1:38.00
1931	Sir Ashley	Anthony Pascuma	James E. Fitzsimmons	Belair Stud	1:38.80
1930	Mr. Sponge	Jimmy McCoy	Henry McDaniel	Joseph E. Widener	1:37.40
1929	Jack High	Linus McAtee	A. Jack Joyner	George D. Widener Jr.	1:38.80
1928	Victorian	Raymond Workman	James G. Rowe Jr.	Harry Payne Whitney	1:40.00
1927	Sweepster	Laverne Fator	Sam Hildreth	Rancocas Stable	1:37.20
1926	Macaw	Linus McAtee	James G. Rowe Sr.	Harry Payne Whitney	1:38.40
1925	Silver Fox	Laverne Fator	Sam Hildreth	Rancocas Stable	1:38.00
