= Clem (horse) =

American Thoroughbred racehorse

- Sire: Shannon (AUS)
- Grandsire: Midstream (GB)
- Dam: Impulsive
- Damsire: Supremus
- Sex: Stallion
- Foaled: 1954
- Country: United States
- Colour: Chestnut
- Breeder: Louis B. Mayer
- Owner: Adele L. Rand
- Trainer: William W. Stephens
- Record: 47: 12-8-13
- Earnings: $535,681

Major wins
- Absecon Island Stakes (1956); Arlington Classic (1957); Withers Stakes (1957); Shevlin Stakes (1957); Woodward Stakes (1958); Washington Park Handicap (1958); United Nations Handicap (1958); Palm Beach Handicap (1959)
- Last updated on June 23, 2010

Clem (foaled 1954 in Kentucky) was an American Thoroughbred racehorse. Bred by MGM Studios boss, Louis B. Mayer, he was purchased and raced by Adele Rand.

Trained by Bill Stephens, younger brother to trainer Woody Stephens, Clem won several prestigious races on dirt and on turf during his four years in racing. In a space of less than two weeks in 1958, he set two track records while beating two horses ranked near the top in American racing history. Clem established his first new track record on September 1, 1958, in the Washington Park Handicap, a one-mile race on turf at Arlington Park in Chicago in which he defeated future U.S. Racing Hall of Fame inductee, Round Table. Clem was then shipped all the way to the East Coast of the United States to the Atlantic City Race Course where on September 13 he set another new track record for a mile and three sixteenths on turf in winning the United Nations Handicap while again defeating Round Table. Clem then beat Round Table for the third time in a row on September 27 in the Woodward Stakes.
