= Washington Park Handicap =

American Thoroughbred horse race

- Class: Grade III
- Location: Arlington Park; Arlington Heights, Illinois, United States
- Inaugurated: 1926
- Race type: Thoroughbred - Flat racing
- Website: www.arlingtonpark.com

Race information
- Distance: 1 1/8 miles (9 furlongs)
- Surface: Polytrack synthetic dirt
- Track: Left-handed
- Qualification: Three-years-old & up
- Weight: Assigned
- Purse: $150,000

The Washington Park Handicap is an American Thoroughbred horse race held annually during the first week of September at Arlington Park Racetrack in Arlington Heights, Illinois. A Grade III event open to horses age three and older, it is contested on Polytrack synthetic dirt over a distance of a mile and one-eighth (9 furlongs). The race is designed to be a prep for the Breeders' Cup Classic.

Inaugurated at the now defunct Washington Park Race Track, in 1958 it was moved to Arlington Park. In 1978 and 1979 it was contested on turf.

In 1935 the race was run as the Washington Park Championship Stakes and from 1980 through 1985 as the Washington Park Stakes.

Since inception, the race has been contested at various distances:

- 6 furlongs : 1927-1934, 1938;
- 1 mile : 1951-1958, 1960–1962, 1965–1972;
- 1 1/8 miles : 1939, 1959, 1963–1964, 1975–1977, 1980–1987, 1989–1997, 2000; 2013
- 1 3/16 miles : 1978-1979 (on turf), 2002–present;
- 1 1/4 : 1926, 1935–36, 1940–1950, 1973–74, 2001.

== Records ==
Speed record: (at current distance of 1 3/16 miles )

- 1:53.53 - Suave (2006) (Dirt)
- 1:55.17 - Lewis Michael (2007) (Polytrack)

Record at 1 mile on dirt - 1:32.20 Dr. Fager (1968) - Note that this time broke the world's record at the distance on dirt. The record still stands

Most wins:

- 2 - Misstep (1929, 1930)
- 2 - Armed (1946, 1947)
- 2 - That's A Nice (1979, 1980)
- 2 - Perfect Drift (2003, 2005)
- 2 - Gran Estreno (2009, 2010)

Most wins by a jockey:

- 6 - Bill Shoemaker (1955, 1956, 1957, 1959, 1962, 1980)

Most wins by a trainer:

- 3 - Harry Trotsek (1950, 1974, 1975)

Most wins by an owner:

- 4 - Calumet Farm (1946, 1947, 1948, 1949)

== Winners ==
| Year | Winner | Age | Jockey | Trainer | Owner | Time |
|---|---|---|---|---|---|---|
| 2014 | Avanzare | 4 | Christopher A. Emigh | Thomas F. Proctor | Lanni/Youngblood | 1:52.76 |
| 2013 | Wilcox Inn | 5 | James Graham | Michael Stidham | Lael Stable and All In Racing | 1:49.62 |
| 2012 | Middie | 4 | Francisco C. Torres | Philip J. Oliver | Humphrey/Watts/St. George Farm Racing | 1:49.27 |
| 2011 | Mister Mardi Gras | 4 | | Chris M. Block | Lothenbach Stables | 1:51.60 |
| 2010 | Gran Estreno | 7 | Michael Baze | Michael Stidham | Feel the Thunder Stable | 1:56.88 |
| 2009 | Gran Estreno | 6 | E.T. Baird | Michael Stidham | Feel The Thunder Stable | 2:00.00 |
| 2008 | no race | | | | | |
| 2007 | Lewis Michael | 4 | E. T. Baird | Wayne M. Catalano | Frank Calabrese | 1:55.17 |
| 2006 | Suave | 5 | Calvin Borel | Paul J. McGee | Jay Em Ess Stable | 1:53.53 |
| 2005 | Perfect Drift | 6 | Mark Guidry | Murray W. Johnson | Stonecrest Farm | 1:54.27 |
| 2004 | Eye of the Tiger | 4 | Eusebio Razo Jr. | Kiaran McLaughlin | John D. Gunther | 1:56.87 |
| 2003 | Perfect Drift | 4 | Pat Day | Murray W. Johnson | Stonecrest Farm | 1:55.49 |
| 2002 | Tenpins | 4 | Robby Albarado | Donald R. Winfree | Joseph Vitello | 1:55.07 |
| 2001 | Guided Tour | 5 | Larry Melancon | Niall O'Callaghan | Morton Fink | 2:00.76 |
| 2000 | Blazing Sword | 6 | Jose A. Rivera II | Kathleen O'Connell | Stonehedge Farm Inc. | 1:50.59 |
| 1999 | Beboppin Baby | 4 | Garrett Gomez | Joe Kasperski Jr. | Lawrence Karp | 1:49.03 |
| 1998 | no race | | | | | |
| 1997 | no race | | | | | |
| 1996 | Polar Expedition | 5 | Mark Guidry | Hugh H. Robertson | James Cody | 1:49.97 |
| 1995 | no race | | | | | |
| 1994 | Brother Brown | 4 | Pat Day | Ron Goodridge | M. Bowline & B. Cohrs | 1:49.77 |
| 1993 | Powerful Punch | 4 | Curt Bourque | Harvey L. Vanier | Russell L. Reineman | 1:50.19 |
| 1992 | Irish Swap | 5 | Bruce Poyadou | Joseph E. Broussard | Randy Hendricks | 1:47.83 |
| 1991 | Black Tie Affair | 5 | Shane Sellers | Ernie T. Poulos | Jeffrey Sullivan | 1:49.45 |
| 1990 | Lay Down | 6 | Herb McCauley | C. R. McGaughey III | Ogden Mills Phipps | 1:48.40 |
| 1989 | Blushing John | 4 | Pat Day | Richard J. Lundy | Allen E. Paulson | 1:50.80 |
| 1988 | no race | | | | | |
| 1987 | Taylor's Special | 6 | John Lively | William I. Mott | William F. Lucas | 1:51.60 |
| 1986 | no race | | | | | |
| 1985 | Par Flite | 4 | Earlie Fires | Carl Nafzger | Tadahiro Hotehama | 1:47.60 |
| 1984 | Thumbsucker | 5 | Sam Maple | John Drumwright | GAT Stable | 1:48.60 |
| 1983 | Harham's Sizzler | 4 | Juvenal Diaz | Lou M. Goldfine | Harham Farm | 1:49.80 |
| 1982 | Summer Advocate | 5 | Pat Day | Mike Ball | Don Ball et al. | 1:49.80 |
| 1981 | Rossi Gold | 5 | Pat Day | Ray Lawrence Jr. | Leslie Combs II | 1:48.60 |
| 1980 | Spectacular Bid | 4 | Bill Shoemaker | Bud Delp | Hawksworth Farm | 1:46.20 |
| 1979 | That's A Nice | 5 | Isaac Jimenez | P. Noel Hickey | Frank J. Sitzberger | 1:50.00 |
| 1978 | That's A Nice | 4 | Douglas Richard | P. Noel Hickey | Frank J. Sitzberger | 1:50.60 |
| 1977 | Majestic Light | 4 | Mike Venezia | John W. Russell | Ogden Mills Phipps | 1:48.00 |
| 1976 | Double Edge Sword | 6 | Vincent Bracciale Jr. | Richard E. Dutrow Sr. | Aisquith Stable | 1:48.20 |
| 1975 | Hasty Flyer | 4 | Heriberto Arroyo | Harry Trotsek | Hasty House Farm | 1:48.60 |
| 1974 | Super Sail | 6 | William Gavidia | Harry Trotsek | Hasty House Farm | 2:03.00 |
| 1973 | Burning On | 5 | Douglas Richard | Ralph Christenson | Dan W. Scott II | 2:02.20 |
| 1972 | Staunch Avenger | 4 | David Whited | Gin Collins | Annette Mann | 1:34.40 |
| 1971 | Well Mannered | 4 | Mickey Solomone | Anthony L. Basile | Bwamazon Farm | 1:34.60 |
| 1970 | Doc's T.V. | 4 | David Whited | John Meaux | Harvey Peltier | 1:36.60 |
| 1969 | Night Invader | 3 | David Whited | Joseph H. Pierce Jr. | Sheila Pierce | 1:36.20 |
| 1968 | Dr. Fager | 4 | Braulio Baeza | John A. Nerud | Tartan Stable | 1:32.20 |
| 1967 | Handsome Boy | 4 | Eddie Belmonte | H. Allen Jerkens | Hobeau Farm | 1:37.60 |
| 1966 | Bold Bidder | 4 | Pete Anderson | Woody Stephens | John R. Gaines | 1:32.80 |
| 1965 | Take Over | 4 | Larry Kunitake | Montell Stewart | Montell Stewart | 1:35.20 |
| 1964 | Gun Bow | 4 | Walter Blum | Edward A. Neloy | Gedney Farm | 1:51.00 |
| 1963 | Crimson Satan | 4 | Herberto Hinojosa | Charles Kerr | Crimson King Farm | 1:49.60 |
| 1962 | Prove It | 5 | Bill Shoemaker | Mesh Tenney | Rex C. Ellsworth | 1:33.80 |
| 1961 | Chief of Chiefs | 4 | Clarence Meaux | Noble Atchison | Ada L. Rice | 1:34.60 |
| 1960 | T. V. Lark | 3 | Johnny Sellers | Paul K. Parker | C. R. Mac Stable | 1:34.20 |
| 1959 | Round Table | 5 | Bill Shoemaker | William Molter | Kerr Stable | 1:47.20 |
| 1958 | Clem | 4 | Johnny Sellers | William W. Stephens | Adele L. Rand | 1:34.00 |
| 1957 | Pucker Up | 4 | Bill Shoemaker | A. A. Robertson | Ada L. Rice | 1:34.80 |
| 1956 | Swaps | 4 | Bill Shoemaker | Mesh Tenney | Rex C. Ellsworth | 1:33.40 |
| 1955 | Jet Action | 4 | Bill Shoemaker | Larry W. Kidd | Maine Chance Farm | 1:34.00 |
| 1954 | Pet Bully | 6 | Bill Hartack | Tommy Kelly | Ada L. Rice | 1:34.40 |
| 1953 | Sickle's Image | 5 | William Cook | Clarence Hartwick | Clarence Hartwick | 1:36.80 |
| 1952 | Crafty Admiral | 4 | Eric Guerin | Robert B. Odom | Charfran Stable | 1:36.80 |
| 1951 | Curandero | 5 | Avelino Gomez | William J. Hirsch | King Ranch | 1:34.60 |
| 1950 | Inseparable | 5 | Kenneth Church | Harry Trotsek | Hasty House Farm | 2:06.20 |
| 1949 | Coaltown | 4 | Steve Brooks | Horace A. Jones | Calumet Farm | 2:03.80 |
| 1948 | Fervent | 4 | Newbold Pierson | Ben A. Jones | Calumet Farm | 2:04.80 |
| 1947 | Armed | 6 | Douglas Dodson | Horace A. Jones | Calumet Farm | 2:02.00 |
| 1946 | Armed | 5 | Douglas Dodson | Ben A. Jones | Calumet Farm | 2:01.00 |
| 1945 | Busher | 3 | Johnny Longden | George M. Odom | Louis B. Mayer | 2:01.80 |
| 1944 | Equifox | 7 | Albert Boidou | Howard Wells | Howard Wells | 2:03.00 |
| 1943 | Royal Nap † | 3 | Warren Mehrtens | Max Hirsch | Lazy F. Ranch | 2:05.00 |
| 1943 | Thumbs Up † | 4 | Otto Grohs | Carl A. Roles | Louis B. Mayer | 2:05.00 |
| 1942 | Marriage | 6 | Charley Corbett | Rene A. Coward | R. A. Coward & Carl Dupuis | 2:02.40 |
| 1941 | Big Pebble | 5 | Jack Westrope | William B. Finnegan | Circle M. Ranch | 2:03.20 |
| 1940 | War Plumage | 4 | Nick Wall | Howard Wells | James Cox Brady Jr. | 2:04.00 |
| 1939 | Star Boarder | 3 | Albert Boidou | James W. Smith | Dixiana Stables | 1:50.20 |
| 1938 | Dora May | 5 | Kenneth McCombs | Henry Forrest | Rockhome Stable | 1:12.00 |
| 1936 | Where Away | 4 | Charley Corbett | Anthony Pelleteri | Anthony Pelleteri | 2:03.00 |
| 1935 | Late Date | 6 | Alfred Robertson | R. E. Mahoney | Brentwood Stable | 2:06.80 |
| 1934 | Isaiah | 4 | Johnny Kacala | Edward Trotter | Edward Trotter | 1:12.00 |
| 1933 | No More | 5 | Eddie Arcaro | Clarence E. Davison | Clarence E. Davison | 1:12.60 |
| 1932 | Gold Step | 5 | Herman Schutte | S. H. Fairbanks | Mrs. S. H. Fairbanks | 1:12.00 |
| 1931 | Tannery | 4 | R. Heigle | John J. Greely | Edward F. Prichard | 1:13.00 |
| 1930 | Misstep | 5 | Elmore Shropshire | Mose Lowenstein | Le Mar Stock Farm Stable | 1:12.40 |
| 1929 | Misstep | 4 | Clarence McCrossen | Mose Lowenstein | Le Mar Stock Farm Stable | 1:12.20 |
| 1928 | no race | | | | | |
| 1927 | Girl Scout | 5 | S. Cooper | Charles E. Durnell | Three D's Stock Farm Stable | 1:15.00 |
| 1926 | Smiling Gus | 3 | L. Edwards | Charles E. Durnell | Charles E. Durnell | 2:10.60 |

* † In 1943 there was a Dead Heat for first.
