= Withers Stakes =

American horse race

- Class: Listed
- Location: Aqueduct Racetrack; Queens, New York, United States
- Inaugurated: 1874 (at Jerome Park Racetrack)
- Race type: Thoroughbred – Flat racing
- Website: NYRA

Race information
- Distance: 1 1/8 miles (9 furlongs)
- Surface: Dirt
- Track: Left-handed
- Qualification: Three-year-olds
- Weight: 123 lbs with allowances
- Purse: $250,000 (since 2014)

The Withers Stakes is a Listed American Thoroughbred horse race for three years old horses over the distance of 1 1/8 miles on the dirt scheduled annually in February at Aqueduct Racetrack in Queens, New York. The event currently carries a purse of $250,000.

== History ==
The Withers was named for David Dunham Withers (1821–1892), an important owner/breeder who won this race in 1890 with his colt, King Eric.

The inaugural run of the Withers Stakes occurred in 1874 at Jerome Park Racetrack. It was raced there through 1889 after which it was hosted by the Morris Park Racecourse from 1890 through 1904, then Jamaica Race Course in 1956, and at Belmont Park from 1957 through 1959 and 1984 through 1996. The Withers was not run in 1911 and 1912 due to a New York State legislated ban on all forms of wagering on horses. It was also not run in 2011, but returned to the New York racing calendar on February 4, 2012.

The Withers was historically run at a distance of one mile but was lengthened to 1 1/16 miles in 2012. In 1956, it was also contested at a mile and a sixteenth. The "Withers Mile", as it was known to racetrackers, was once one of America's great races, on par with events like England's St James's Palace Stakes and France's Prix Jacques Le Marois. Winners included outstanding sires like Dr. Fager, Jaipur, Hagley, Bold Reasoning, Hill Prince, Polynesian, Menow, and Blue Larkspur. In 1919, Sir Barton won the Kentucky Derby and Preakness Stakes, then won the Withers before winning the Belmont Stakes to complete the Triple Crown. Count Fleet repeated this feat in 1943. Other famous winners of the race include Man o' War and Native Dancer.

The Withers is a prep race on the Road to the Kentucky Derby.

In 2018 the distance of the event was increased to 1 1/8 miles.

In 2025 the event was downgraded by the Thoroughbred Owners and Breeders Association to Listed status.

== Records ==
Speed record:

- 1 1/8 miles – 1:50.27 Tax (2019)
- 1 1/16 miles – 1:43.93 Far From Over (2015)
- 1 mile – 1:32.40 Williamstown (1993)

Most wins by a jockey:

- 6 – Eddie Arcaro (1940, 1946, 1949, 1950, 1951, 1955)

Most wins by a trainer:

- 5 – James G. Rowe Sr. (1883, 1884, 1904, 1908, 1909)

Most wins by an owner:

- 5 – James R. Keene (1879, 1892, 1904, 1908, 1909)

== Winners ==
| Year | Winner | Jockey | Trainer | Owner | Dist. (Miles) | Time | Win$ | Gr. |
|---|---|---|---|---|---|---|---|---|
| 2026 | Talk to Me Jimmy | Ruben Silvera | Rudy R. Rodriguez | SEI Thoroughbreds & Rudy R. Rodriguez | 1 1/8 M | 1:51.68 | $200,000 | Listed |
| 2025 | Captain Cook | Manuel Franco | Richard E. Dutrow Jr. | St. Elias Stable | 1 1/8 M | 1:51.83 | $137,500 | Listed |
| 2024 | Uncle Heavy | Mychel Sanchez | Robert Reid Jr. | Michael Milam | 1 1/8 M | 1:53.79 | $137,500 | G3 |
| 2023 | Hit Show | Manuel Franco | Brad H. Cox | Gary West & Mary West | 1 1/8 M | 1:54.71 | $137,500 | G3 |
| 2022 | Early Voting | José Ortiz | Chad C. Brown | Klaravich Stables | 1 1/8 M | 1:55.90 | $137,500 | G3 |
| 2021 | Risk Taking | Eric Cancel | Chad C. Brown | Klaravich Stables | 1 1/8 M | 1:51.91 | $137,500 | G3 |
| 2020 | Max Player | Dylan Davis | Linda L. Rice | George Hall | 1 1/8 M | 1:53.87 | $137,500 | G3 |
| 2019 | Tax | Junior Alvarado | Danny Gargan | R. A. Hill Stable, Reeves Racing, Hugh Lynch & Corms Racing | 1 1/8 M | 1:50.27 | $137,500 | G3 |
| 2018 | Avery Island | Joe Bravo | Kiaran McLaughlin | Godolphin Racing | 1 1/8 M | 1:51.01 | $150,000 | G3 |
| 2017 | El Areeb | Trevor McCarthy | Cathal Lynch | M M C Stables LLC | 1 1/16 M | 1:44.47 | $150,000 | G3 |
| 2016 | Sunny Ridge | Manuel Franco | Jason Servis | Dennis Drazin | 1 1/16 M | 1:46.99 | $150,000 | G3 |
| 2015 | Far From Over | Manuel Franco | Todd A. Pletcher | Black Rock Thoroughbreds | 1 1/16 M | 1:43.93 | $150,000 | G3 |
| 2014 | Samraat | José Ortiz | Richard A. Violette Jr. | My Meadowview Farm | 1 1/16 M | 1:46.31 | $150,000 | G3 |
| 2013 | Revolutionary | Javier Castellano | Todd A. Pletcher | WinStar Farm | 1 1/16 M | 1:44.32 | $120,000 | G3 |
| 2012 | Alpha | Ramon A. Dominguez | Kiaran McLaughlin | Godolphin Racing | 1 1/16 M | 1:44.23 | $120,000 | G3 |
| 2011 | Race not held | | | | | | | |
| 2010 | Afleet Again | Abel Mariano | Robert Reid Jr. | Chuck Zacney | 1 M | 1:34.05 | $90,000 | G3 |
| 2009 | Mr. Fantasy | Richard Migliore | Kiaran McLaughlin | West Point Thoroughbreds | 1 M | 1:34.91 | $90,000 | G3 |
| 2008 | Harlem Rocker | Eibar Coa | Todd A. Pletcher | Adena Racing Venture II | 1 M | 1:34.50 | $90,000 | G3 |
| 2007 | Divine Park | Alan Garcia | Kiaran McLaughlin | James J. Barry | 1 M | 1:34.65 | $90,000 | G3 |
| 2006 | Bernardini | Javier Castellano | Tom Albertrani | Darley Stable | 1 M | 1:35.07 | $90,000 | G3 |
| 2005 | Scrappy T | Norberto Arroyo Jr. | W. Robert Bailes | Marshall E. Dowell | 1 M | 1:35.60 | $90,000 | G3 |
| 2004 | Medallist | Jorge Chavez | H. Allen Jerkens | Robert N. Clay | 1 M | 1:34.40 | $90,000 | G3 |
| 2003 | Spite the Devil | Luis Chavez | H. Allen Jerkens | Hardwicke Stable | 1 M | 1:35.80 | $90,000 | G3 |
| 2002 | Fast Decision | José A. Santos | Christophe Clement | Peter Karches | 1 M | 1:36.40 | $90,000 | G3 |
| 2001 | Richly Blended | Rick Wilson | Benjamin W. Perkins Jr. | Raymond Dweck | 1 M | 1:35.60 | $90,000 | G3 |
| 2000 | Big E E | Heberto Castillo Jr. | James A. Jerkens | Hollow Farms | 1 M | 1:35.60 | $90,000 | G3 |
| 1999 | Successful Appeal | Jose Espinoza | John C. Kimmel | Starview Stable (Joseph & Pam Petruska) | 1 M | 1:35.00 | $90,000 | G2 |
| 1998 | Dice Dancer | Jorge Chavez | H. Allen Jerkens | Hobeau Farm | 1 M | 1:34.40 | $90,000 | G2 |
| 1997 | Statesmanship | Herb McCauley | Christophe Clement | Peter F. Karches | 1 M | 1:35.20 | $67,140 | G2 |
| 1996 | Appealing Skier | Rick Wilson | Ben W. Perkins Sr. | New Farm | 1 M | 1:35.00 | $66,120 | G2 |
| 1995 | Blu Tusmani | José A. Santos | Christophe Clement | Sidney L. Port | 1 M | 1:35.00 | $67,260 | G2 |
| 1994 | Twining | José A. Santos | Scotty Schulhofer | Sheikh Mohammed | 1 M | 1:34.60 | $67,140 | G2 |
| 1993 | Williamstown | Craig Perret | Peter M. Vestal | Peter S. Willmott | 1 M | 1:32.40 | $76,800 | G2 |
| 1992 | Dixie Brass | Julio Pezua | Dennis J. Brida | Michael Watral | 1 M | 1:33.60 | $73,080 | G2 |
| 1991 | Subordinated Debt | Julie Krone | David Monaci | Leslie R. Grimm | 1 M | 1:34.00 | $73,920 | G2 |
| 1990 | Housebuster | Craig Perret | Warren A. Croll Jr. | Robert P. Levy | 1 M | 1:34.80 | $71,040 | G2 |
| 1989 | Fire Maker | Jerry Bailey | William Badgett Jr. | Arthur I. Appleton | 1 M | 1:36.40 | $73,800 | G2 |
| 1988 | Once Wild | Pat Day | John J. Lenzini Jr. | Gary Marano | 1 M | 1:35.20 | $69,360 | G2 |
| 1987 | Gone West | Eddie Maple | Woody Stephens | Hickory Tree Stable | 1 M | 1:36.40 | $82,620 | G2 |
| 1986 | Clear Choice | Jorge Velásquez | D. Wayne Lukas | Eugene V. Klein | 1 M | 1:35.60 | $58,050 | G2 |
| 1985 | El Basco | Jacinto Vásquez | Woodrow Sedlacek | Jacques Wimpfheimer | 1 M | 1:36.60 | $72,990 | G2 |
| 1984 | Play On | Jean-Luc Samyn | William H. Turner Jr. | Welcome Farm | 1 M | 1:36.40 | $69,750 | G2 |
| 1983 | Country Pine | Jerry D. Bailey | Lou Rondinello | Daniel M. Galbreath | 1 M | 1:35.60 | $52,380 | G2 |
| 1982 | Aloma's Ruler | Jack Kaenel | John J. Lenzini Jr. | Nathan Scherr | 1 M | 1:35.40 | $33,300 | G2 |
| 1981 | Spirited Boy | Ángel Cordero Jr. | Joseph Nash | Harry Speier | 1 M | 1:36.80 | $33,600 | G2 |
| 1980 | Colonel Moran | Jorge Velásquez | Thomas J. Kelly | Townsend B. Martin | 1 M | 1:34.40 | $34,200 | G2 |
| 1979 | Czaravich | Jean Cruguet | William H. Turner Jr. | William L. Reynolds | 1 M | 1:35.60 | $33,330 | G2 |
| 1978 | Junction | Mickey Solomone | Patrick J. Kelly | Live Oak Racing (Charlotte Weber) | 1 M | 1:36.80 | $32,520 | G2 |
| 1977 | Iron Constitution | Jorge Velásquez | Thomas F. Root Jr. | Harry T. Mangurian Jr. | 1 M | 1:37.00 | $33,360 | G2 |
| 1976 | Sonkisser | Braulio Baeza | Stephen A. DiMauro | Harold Snyder | 1 M | 1:35.00 | $32,760 | G2 |
| 1975 | Sarsar | Bill Shoemaker | David A. Whiteley | William Haggin Perry | 1 M | 1:34.60 | $36,360 | G2 |
| 1974 | Accipiter | Angel Santiago | Pancho Martin | Sigmund Sommer | 1 M | 1:36.40 | $36,240 | G2 |
| 1973 | Linda's Chief | Braulio Baeza | Al Scotti | Aaron U. Jones | 1 M | 1:34.60 | $33,120 | G2 |
| 1972 | Key to the Mint | Braulio Baeza | J. Elliott Burch | Rokeby Stables | 1 M | 1:34.80 | $35,400 | |
| 1971 | Bold Reasoning | Jacinto Vásquez | Nick Gonzales | Kosgrove Stable | 1 M | 1:35.80 | $35,100 | |
| 1970 | Hagley | Ron Turcotte | Woods Garth | Hickory Tree Stable | 1 M | 1:34.80 | $38,805 | |
| 1969 | Ack Ack † | Manuel Ycaza | Woody Stephens | Cain Hoy Stable | 1 M | 1:34.80 | $37,765 | |
| 1968 | Call Me Prince | William Boland | Max Hirsch | Adele L. Rand | 1 M | 1:35.20 | $38,220 | |
| 1967 | Dr. Fager | Braulio Baeza | John A. Nerud | Tartan Stable | 1 M | 1:33.80 | $37,895 | |
| 1966 | Indulto | John L. Rotz | Max Hirsch | Jane Greer | 1 M | 1:35.00 | $38,935 | |
| 1965 | Flag Raiser | Bobby Ussery | Hirsch Jacobs | Isidor Bieber | 1 M | 1:34.20 | $39,000 | |
| 1964 | Mr. Brick | Bobby Ussery | James E. Picou | Roy Sturgis | 1 M | 1:35.60 | $40,105 | |
| 1963 | Get Around | Braulio Baeza | George T. Poole | Maine Chance Farm | 1 M | 1:36.60 | $39,650 | |
| 1962 | Jaipur | Bill Shoemaker | Bert Mulholland | George D. Widener Jr. | 1 M | 1:35.60 | $38,090 | |
| 1961 | Hitting Away | Hedley Woodhouse | James Fitzsimmons | Ogden Phipps | 1 M | 1:35.20 | $38,935 | |
| 1960 | John William | Hedley Woodhouse | Bernie Fields | Merrick Stable | 1 M | 1:35.40 | $74,950 | |
| 1959 | Intentionally | Manuel Ycaza | Edward Kelly Sr. | Brookfield Farm | 1 M | 1:35.60 | $58,072 | |
| 1958 | Sir Robby | Eric Guerin | Sidney J. Smith | John S. Kroese | 1 M | 1:36.20 | $19,362 | |
| 1957 | Clem | Conn McCreary | William W. Stephens | Adele L. Rand | 1 M | 1:36.80 | $19,100 | |
| 1956 | Oh Johnny | Hedley Woodhouse | Norman McLeod | Mrs. Wallace Gilroy | 1 1/16 M | 1:45.20 | $20,100 | |
| 1955 | Traffic Judge | Eddie Arcaro | Woody Stephens | Clifford Mooers | 1 M | 1:36.00 | $21,850 | |
| 1954 | Jet Action | José Contreras | Edward A. Neloy | Maine Chance Farm | 1 M | 1:36.00 | $26,250 | |
| 1953 | Native Dancer | Eric Guerin | William C. Winfrey | Alfred G. Vanderbilt II | 1 M | 1:36.20 | $23,050 | |
| 1952 | Armageddon | Raymond York | Moody Jolley | Cain Hoy Stable | 1 M | 1:37.00 | $22,000 | |
| 1951 | Battlefield | Eddie Arcaro | Bert Mulholland | George D. Widener Jr. | 1 M | 1:35.80 | $20,600 | |
| 1950 | Hill Prince | Eddie Arcaro | Casey Hayes | Christopher Chenery | 1 M | 1:35.80 | $20,700 | |
| 1949 | Olympia | Eddie Arcaro | Ivan H. Parke | Fred W. Hooper | 1 M | 1:36.80 | $21,150 | |
| 1948 | Vulcan's Forge | Douglas Dodson | Sylvester Veitch | C. V. Whitney | 1 M | 1:37.40 | $20,100 | |
| 1947 | Faultless | Douglas Dodson | Horace A. Jones | Calumet Farm | 1 M | 1:38.20 | $20,950 | |
| 1946 | Hampden | Eddie Arcaro | Richard E. Handlen | Foxcatcher Farm | 1 M | 1:36.00 | $20,320 | |
| 1945 | Polynesian | Wayne D. Wright | Morris H. Dixon | Gertrude T. Widener | 1 M | 1:39.80 | $19,125 | |
| 1944 | Who Goes There | Johnny Longden | Bert Mulholland | George D. Widener Jr. | 1 M | 1:38.00 | $16,150 | |
| 1943 | Count Fleet | Johnny Longden | Don Cameron | Fannie Hertz | 1 M | 1:36.00 | $12,700 | |
| 1942 | Alsab | Basil James | Sarge Swenke | Albert Sabath | 1 M | 1:36.20 | $15,500 | |
| 1941 | King Cole | John Gilbert | James Fitzsimmons | Ogden Phipps | 1 M | 1:38.20 | $20,300 | |
| 1940 | Corydon | Eddie Arcaro | John M. Gaver Sr. | Greentree Stable | 1 M | 1:37.20 | $16,650 | |
| 1939 | Johnstown | James Stout | James Fitzsimmons | Belair Stud | 1 M | 1:35.80 | $15,750 | |
| 1938 | Menow | Charles Kurtsinger | Duval A. Headley | Hal Price Headley | 1 M | 1:37.40 | $15,000 | |
| 1937 | Flying Scot | John Gilbert | James W. Healy | John Hay Whitney | 1 M | 1:37.40 | $15,050 | |
| 1936 | White Cockade | Eddie Litzenberger | James Fitzsimmons | Ogden Phipps | 1 M | 1:37.20 | $18,200 | |
| 1935 | Rosemont | Wayne D. Wright | Richard E. Handlen | Foxcatcher Farms | 1 M | 1:36.60 | $11,250 | |
| 1934 | Singing Wood | Robert Jones | James W. Healy | Liz Whitney | 1 M | 1:37.80 | $16,000 | |
| 1933 | The Darb | Alfred Robertson | Thomas J. Healey | Cornelius V. Whitney | 1 M | 1:39.00 | $20,550 | |
| 1932 | Boatswain | Alfred Robertson | Preston M. Burch | Walter M. Jeffords | 1 M | 1:39.80 | $21,600 | |
| 1931 | Jamestown | Linus McAtee | A. Jack Joyner | George D. Widener Jr. | 1 M | 1:36.60 | $27,300 | |
| 1930 | Whichone | Raymond Workman | Thomas J. Healey | Harry Payne Whitney | 1 M | 1:38.20 | $26,150 | |
| 1929 | Blue Larkspur | Mack Garner | Herbert J. Thompson | Edward R. Bradley | 1 M | 1:36.00 | $28,250 | |
| 1928 | Victorian | Raymond Workman | James G. Rowe Jr. | Harry Payne Whitney | 1 M | 1:39.00 | $22,300 | |
| 1927 | Chance Shot | Earl Sande | Pete Coyne | Joseph E. Widener | 1 M | 1:39.80 | $23,250 | |
| 1926 | Haste | Earl Sande | G. Hamilton Keene | Joseph E. Widener | 1 M | 1:37.60 | $22,800 | |
| 1925 | American Flag | Albert Johnson | Gwyn R. Tompkins | Glen Riddle Farm | 1 M | 1:38.20 | $19,600 | |
| 1924 | Bracadale | Earl Sande | Sam Hildreth | Rancocas Stable | 1 M | 1:39.00 | $19,000 | |
| 1923 | Zev | Earl Sande | David J. Leary | Rancocas Stable | 1 M | 1:37.40 | $18,300 | |
| 1922 | Snob II | Clarence Kummer | William Garth | Joshua S. Cosden | 1 M | 1:35.80 | $17,050 | |
| 1921 | Leonardo II | Andy Schuttinger | Kimball Patterson | Xalapa Farm | 1 M | 1:37.40 | $5,475 | |
| 1920 | Man o' War | Clarence Kummer | Louis Feustel | Glen Riddle Farm | 1 M | 1:35.80 | $4,825 | |
| 1919 | Sir Barton | Johnny Loftus | H. Guy Bedwell | J. K. L. Ross | 1 M | 1:38.80 | $8,075 | |
| 1918 | Motor Cop | Edward Taplin | Walter B. Jennings | A. Kingsley Macomber | 1 M | 1:39.60 | $7,100 | |
| 1917 | Hourless | Jimmy Butwell | Sam Hildreth | August Belmont Jr. | 1 M | 1:39.00 | $5,475 | |
| 1916 | Spur | Johnny Loftus | John H. McCormack | James Butler | 1 M | 1:38.40 | $2,900 | |
| 1915 | The Finn | George Byrne | Edward W. Heffner | Harry C. Hallenbeck | 1 M | 1:39.40 | $1,425 | |
| 1914 | Charlestonian | Charles Burlingame | George W. Langdon | John W. Messervy | 1 M | 1:39.80 | $2,900 | |
| 1913 | Rock View | James H. Butwell | Sam Hildreth | August Belmont Jr. | 1 M | 1:39.40 | $2,325 | |
| 1912 | No races held due to the Hart–Agnew Law | | | | | | | |
| 1911 | No races held due to the Hart–Agnew Law | | | | | | | |
| 1910 | The Turk | Matt McGee | Richard O. Miller | William S. Fanshawe | 1 M | 1:40.00 | $3,000 | |
| 1909 | Hilarious | James H. Butwell | James G. Rowe Sr. | James R. Keene | 1 M | 1:41.20 | $11,000 | |
| 1908 | Colin | Joe Notter | James G. Rowe Sr. | James R. Keene | 1 M | 1:41.00 | $12,090 | |
| 1907 | Frank Gill | Joe Notter | John I. Smith | Jack L. McGinnis | 1 M | 1:40.00 | $7,775 | |
| 1906 | Accountant | Jack Martin | Robert Tucker | W. Harry Brown | 1 M | 1:38.80 | $6,850 | |
| 1905 | Blandy | Willie Davis | A. Jack Joyner | August Belmont Jr. | 1 M | 1:44.60 | $6,220 | |
| 1904 | Delhi | George Odom | James G. Rowe Sr. | James R. Keene | 1 M | 1:40.00 | $5,750 | |
| 1903 | Shorthose | William Haack | W. Fred Presgrave | Goughacres Stable | 1 M | 1:41.00 | $6,395 | |
| 1902 | Compute | Willie Shaw | R. W. Walden | Alfred Hennen Morris & Dave Hennen Morris | 1 M | 1:42.00 | $4,815 | |
| 1901 | The Parader | Frank Landry | Thomas J. Healey | Richard T. Wilson Jr. | 1 M | 1:42.50 | $5,020 | |
| 1900 | Kilmarnock | Nash Turner | John W. Rogers | William C. Whitney | 1 M | 1:41.25 | $5,470 | |
| 1899 | Jean Bereaud | Richard Clawson | Sam Hildreth | Sydney Paget | 1 M | 1:42.25 | $4,450 | |
| 1898 | The Huguenot | Henry Spencer | Lewis S. Thompson | William P. & Lewis S. Thompson | 1 M | 1:43.00 | $3,815 | |
| 1897 | Octagon | Willie Simms | John J. Hyland | August Belmont Jr. | 1 M | 1:43.00 | $2,550 | |
| 1896 | Handspring | Willie Simms | Frank McCabe | Philip J. Dwyer | 1 M | 1:41.00 | $2,550 | |
| 1895 | Lucania | Lester Reiff | John W. Rogers | John W. Rogers | 1 M | 1:41.75 | $2,700 | |
| 1894 | Domino | Fred Taral | William Lakeland | James R. & Foxhall P. Keene | 1 M | 1:40.00 | $7,100 | |
| 1893 | Dr. Rice | Fred Taral | Fred Foster | Fred Foster | 1 M | 1:42.00 | $9,470 | |
| 1892 | Tammany | Edward Garrison | Matthew Byrnes | Marcus Daly | 1 M | 1:40.00 | $7,460 | |
| 1891 | Picknicker | Fred Littlefield | Louis Stuart | Louis Stuart & Co. | 1 M | 1:40.75 | $4,190 | |
| 1890 | King Eric | Edward Garrison | Barney Riley | David D. Withers | 1 M | 1:41.00 | $8,140 | |
| 1889 | Diabolo | P. Godfrey | James Dumas | Castle Stable | 1 M | 1:45.00 | $5,380 | |
| 1888 | Sir Dixon | W. Fitzgerald | Frank McCabe | Dwyer Brothers Stable | 1 M | 1:47.75 | $3,620 | |
| 1887 | Hanover | Jim McLaughlin | Frank McCabe | Dwyer Brothers Stable | 1 M | 1:46.50 | $3,490 | |
| 1886 | Biggonet | Robert M. Maynard | William P. Burch | William P. Burch | 1 M | 1:48.00 | $3,260 | |
| 1885 | Tyrant | Patsy Duffy | William R. Claypool | James Ben Ali Haggin | 1 M | 1:45.25 | $3,070 | |
| 1884 | Panique | William J. Fitzpatrick | James G. Rowe Sr. | Dwyer Brothers Stable | 1 M | 1:45.25 | $3,240 | |
| 1883 | George Kinney | Jim McLaughlin | James G. Rowe Sr. | Dwyer Brothers Stable | 1 M | 1:45.00 | $2,990 | |
| 1882 | Forester | Jim McLaughlin | Lewis Stewart | Appleby & Johnson | 1 M | 1:46.50 | $4,600 | |
| 1881 | Crickmore | Lloyd Hughes | Bill Bird | Ogden Bowie | 1 M | 1:48.00 | $4,275 | |
| 1880 | Ferncliffe | William Barrett | William R. Babcock | William R. Babcock & Co. | 1 M | 1:49.00 | $3,800 | |
| 1879 | Dan Sparling | Mr. Kelly | Thomas Puryear | James R. Keene | 1 M | 1:48.00 | $5,395 | |
| 1878 | Duke of Magenta | Lloyd Hughes | R. Wyndham Walden | George L. Lorillard | 1 M | 1:48.00 | $3,500 | |
| 1877 | Bombast | William Barrett | William Prior | Pierre Lorillard IV | 1 M | 1:46.00 | $4,200 | |
| 1876 | Fiddlesticks | Edward Feakes | Jacob Pincus | August Belmont | 1 M | 1:46.50 | $3,500 | |
| 1875 | Aristides | Robert Swim | Ansel Williamson | H. Price McGrath | 1 M | 1:45.75 | $4,150 | |
| 1874 | Dublin | R. Ponton | not yet found | Joseph Donohue | 1 M | 1:50.00 | $3,200 | |

* † In 1969, Gleaming Light finished first, but was disqualified and set back to fifth.

== See also ==
- Road to the Kentucky Derby
- List of American and Canadian Graded races
