= Honor Glide =

American-bred Thoroughbred racehorse

- Sire: Honor Grades
- Grandsire: Danzig
- Dam: Becky Branch
- Damsire: Run the Gantlet
- Sex: Stallion
- Foaled: 1994
- Country: United States
- Colour: Bay
- Breeder: Bonnie Heath Farm
- Owner: Robert G. Schaedle III & Bonnie Heath Farm
- Trainer: 1) James E. Day; 2) Christophe Clement (from 1999)
- Record: 38: 11-5-2
- Earnings: US$1,397,187

Major wins
- Secretariat Stakes (1997); American Derby (1997); Arlington Classic (1997); Sword Dancer Invitational Handicap (1999); Bowling Green Handicap (1999); Niagara Breeders' Cup Handicap (2001)
- Last updated on January 22, 2010

Honor Glide (foaled 1994 in Florida) is an American Thoroughbred racehorse. He won a number of important races between 1997 and 2001 and was particularly effective on turf courses.

== Background ==
Sired by Honor Grades, whose grandsire was Northern Dancer and whose damsire was Secretariat, Honor Glide was bred by Bonnie Heath Farm. He was purchased for $31,000 at the 1995 Fasig-Tipton July yearling sale by Robert G. Schaedle III on the advice of 1968 Summer Olympics Equestrian Gold Medalist and Canadian Horse Racing Hall of Fame trainer, Jim Day.

== Racing career ==
Trained by Jim Day, the two-time Grade 1 winner became best known for sweeping the 1997 Mid-America Triple, a series of three important Graded stakes races on turf at Arlington Park in Chicago consisting of the Secretariat Stakes, American Derby, and in course-record-equaling time, the Arlington Classic.

Bonnie Heath Farm re-acquired a half-share in Honor Glide and under new trainer Christophe Clement won the 1999 Grade 1 Sword Dancer Invitational Handicap at Saratoga Race Course His last significant win came in the 2001 Niagara Breeders' Cup Handicap at Woodbine Racetrack in Toronto.

Honor Glade competed from age three through eight.

== Stud record ==
Retired from racing in March 2002, Honor Glide stood at stud at CloverLeaf Farms II in Reddick, Florida, in 2003 and 2004 before being moved for the 2005 season to Bridlewood Farm in Ocala, Florida. He stood at Fanlew Farms in Sarepta, Louisiana, from 2010 onto his death in 2012.

Honor Glide died April 4, 2012, of an apparent heart attack at the age of 18.
