= Bed O' Roses Stakes =

- Class: Grade II
- Location: Belmont Park; Elmont, New York, United States
- Inaugurated: 1957
- Race type: Thoroughbred – Flat racing

Race information
- Distance: 7 furlongs
- Surface: Dirt
- Track: left-handed
- Qualification: Fillies & Mares, four-years-old & up
- Weight: Assigned
- Purse: US$300,000 (2025)

The Bed O' Roses Stakes is a Grade II American Thoroughbred horse race for fillies and mares four-year-olds and older, over a distance of seven furlongs on the dirt track held annually in early June at Belmont Park in Elmont, New York. The event currently carries a purse of $300,000.

== History ==
The race was named for Alfred G. Vanderbilt II's Hall of Fame inductee, Bed O' Roses, the American Champion Two-Year-Old Filly in 1949 and the American Champion Older Female Horse of 1951.

This race was first run at Jamaica Race Course and continued there until 1959, after which it moved to Aqueduct Racetrack, where it was run until 2010, when it moved to Belmont Park. It was run in two divisions in 1964 and 1979, and its distance for its first three years was a mile and a sixteenth and then again in 1977 and 1978. It was contested at one mile from 1960 through 2005 with the exception of 1984, when it was set at a mile and seventy yards.

The event was changed from a Handicap to an Invitational Stake in 2017. Due to the reconstruction of Belmont Park reconstruction, the race was moved back to Aqueduct in 2024 and to the Saratoga Race Course in 2025.

== Records ==
Speed record:

- 1:21.05 – Ways and Means (2026) (at the current distance of 7 furlongs)
- 1:33.60 – Dixie Flag (1998) (at the previous distance of 8 furlongs)

Margins:

- 7 3/4 lengths – Ways And Means (2025)

Most wins:

- 2 – Straight Deal II (1967, 1968)
- 2 – Lady D'Accord (1992, 1993)
- 2 – Raging Fever (2002, 2003)
- 2 – By the Moon (2016, 2017)
- 2 - Ways and Means (2025, 2026)

Most wins by a jockey:

- 4 – Irad Ortiz Jr. (2014, 2018, 2023, 2024)

Most wins by a trainer:

- 7 – H. Allen Jerkens (1964, 1973, 1988, 1994, 1995, 1998, 2004)

Most wins by an owner:

- 3 – Hobeau Farm (1964, 1973, 1995)
- 3 - Klaravich Stables (2019, 2025, 2026)

== Winners ==
| Year | Winner | Age | Jockey | Trainer | Owner | Time | Purse | Grade | Distance |
|---|---|---|---|---|---|---|---|---|---|
At Saratoga
| 2026 | Ways and Means | 5 | Flavien Prat | Chad C. Brown | Klaravich Stables | 1:21.05 | $300,000 | II | 7 furlongs |
| 2025 | Ways and Means | 4 | Flavien Prat | Chad C. Brown | Klaravich Stables | 1:21.11 | $300,000 | II | 7 furlongs |
At Aqueduct
| 2024 | Accede | 4 | Irad Ortiz Jr. | Chad C. Brown | Juddmonte Farm | 1:22.83 | $200,000 | II | 7 furlongs |
At Belmont Park
| 2023 | Goodnight Olive | 5 | Irad Ortiz Jr. | Chad C. Brown | First Row Partners & Team Hanley | 1:22.39 | $194,000 | II | 7 furlongs |
| 2022 | Bella Sofia | 4 | Luis Saez | Rudy R. Rodriguez | Sofia Soares, Michael Imperio, Vincent S. Scuderi, Matthew Mercurio, & Parkland Thoroughbreds | 1:21.36 | $300,000 | II | 7 furlongs |
| 2021 | Estilo Talentoso | 4 | Javier Castellano | Juan Arriagada | Medallion Racing, Barry Fowler, Parkland Thoroughbreds, Little Red Feather Racing | 1:22.96 | $294,000 | III | 7 furlongs |
| 2019 | Separationofpowers | 4 | José Ortiz | Chad C. Brown | Klaravich Stable | 1:21.46 | $245,000 | III | 7 furlongs |
| 2018 | Lewis Bay | 5 | Irad Ortiz Jr | Chad C. Brown | Alpine Delta Stable | 1:21.11 | $240,000 | III | 7 furlongs |
| 2017 | By the Moon | 5 | Rajiv Maragh | Michelle Nevin | Jay Em Ess Stable | 1:23.46 | $250,000 | III | 7 furlongs |
| 2016 | By the Moon | 4 | José Ortiz | Michelle Nevin | Jay Em Ess Stable | 1:21.98 | $150,000 | III | 7 furlongs |
| 2015 | Dame Dorothy | 4 | Javier Castellano | Todd Pletcher | Bobby Flay | 1:24.19 | $150,000 | III | 7 furlongs |
| 2014 | Hot Stones | 4 | Irad Ortiz Jr. | Bruce N. Levine | Valente/the Bilinskis | 1:21.98 | $150,000 | III | 7 furlongs |
| 2013 | Dance to Bristol | 4 | Xavier Perez | Ollie L. Figgins, III | Susan H. Wantz | 1:20.81 | $150,000 | III | 7 furlongs |
| 2012 | Derwin's Star | 5 | Ramon Domínguez | Steve Klesaris | Marcia Cohen and Steve Klesaris | 1:22.53 | $150,000 | III | 7 furlongs |
| 2011 | Tamarind Hall | 4 | David Cohen | Jeremiah Englehardt | Eklektikos Stable | 1:23.82 | $150,000 | III | 7 furlongs |
| 2010 | Rightly So | 4 | Cornelio Velásquez | Tony Dutrow | Zayat Stable | 1:22.44 | $150,000 | III | 7 furlongs |
At Aqueduct Racetrack
| 2009 | Seattle Smooth | 4 | Ramon Domínguez | Anthony W. Dutrow | Mercedes Stable | 1:23.48 | $150,000 | II | 7 furlongs |
| 2008 | Rite Moment | 4 | Rajiv Maragh | Gary C. Contessa | Winning Move Stable et al. | 1:22.66 | $150,000 | II | 7 furlongs |
| 2007 | Carmandia | 5 | Mike Luzzi | Richard E. Dutrow Jr. | Four Roses Thorbred. | 1:22.98 | $150,000 | II | 7 furlongs |
| 2006 | Magnolia Jackson | 4 | Norberto Arroyo Jr. | Gary C. Contessa | Ted Taylor | 1:23.87 | $150,000 | II | 7 furlongs |
| 2005 | Pleasant Home | 4 | Cornelio Velásquez | C. R. McGaughey III | Phipps Stable | 1:36.60 | $150,000 | III | 1 mile |
| 2004 | Passing Shot | 5 | José A. Santos | H. Allen Jerkens | Joseph V. Shields Jr. | 1:35.40 | $150,000 | III | 1 mile |
| 2003 | Raging Fever | 5 | Aaron Gryder | Mark A. Hennig | Edward P. Evans | 1:34.80 | $150,000 | III | 1 mile |
| 2002 | Raging Fever | 4 | John Velazquez | Mark A. Hennig | Edward P. Evans | 1:34.80 | $150,000 | III | 1 mile |
| 2001 | Country Hideaway | 5 | John Velazquez | C. R. McGaughey III | Ogden Phipps | 1:34.80 | $150,000 | III | 1 mile |
| 2000 | Ruby Rubles | 5 | Chuck C. Lopez | John Parisella | Celtic Pride Stable | 1:36.80 | $150,000 | III | 1 mile |
| 1999 | Catinca | 4 | Richard Migliore | John C. Kimmel | Robert K. Waxman | 1:34.80 | $150,000 | III | 1 mile |
| 1998 | Dixie Flag | 4 | Mike Luzzi | H. Allen Jerkens | Bohemia Stable | 1:33.60 | $150,000 | III | 1 mile |
| 1997 | Flat Fleet Feet | 4 | Mike E. Smith | John C. Kimmel | C. Kimmel & P. Solondz | 1:34.00 | $150,000 | III | 1 mile |
| 1996 | Punkin Pie | 6 | Jose Trejo | Juan Serey | James A. Riccio | 1:35.00 | $100,000 | II | 1 mile |
| 1995 | Incinerate | 5 | Frank Leon | H. Allen Jerkens | Hobeau Farm | 1:35.80 | $100,000 | II | 1 mile |
| 1994 | Classy Mirage | 4 | Robbie Davis | H. Allen Jerkens | Middletown Stables | 1:34.00 | $100,000 | II | 1 mile |
| 1993 | Lady D'Accord | 6 | Jorge F. Chavez | Nick Zito | Akindale Farm | 1:36.60 | $100,000 | II | 1 mile |
| 1992 | Lady D'Accord | 5 | Jorge F. Chavez | Nick Zito | Akindale Farm | 1:37.80 | $100,000 | II | 1 mile |
| 1991 | Devil's Orchid | 4 | Russell Baze | Richard Mandella | George Yates | 1:35.80 | $100,000 | II | 1 mile |
| 1990 | Survive | 6 | José A. Santos | Richard Mandella | R. Dee Hubbard | 1:35.20 | $100,000 | II | 1 mile |
| 1989 | Banker's Lady | 4 | Ángel Cordero Jr. | Philip M. Hauswald | Edward A. Cox Jr. | 1:35.40 | $100,000 | II | 1 mile |
| 1988 | Aptostar | 3 | Julie Krone | H. Allen Jerkens | Centennial Farm | 1:35.40 | $100,000 | II | 1 mile |
| 1987 | Ms. Eloise | 4 | Robbie Davis | Philip G. Johnson | Margaret Grimm | 1:36.60 | $100,000 | III | 1 mile |
| 1986 | Chaldea | 5 | Jean-Luc Samyn | Thomas J. Skiffington | L. R. Magnum | 1:36.00 | $100,000 | III | 1 mile |
| 1985 | Nany | 5 | Jacinto Vásquez | Richard R. Root | Harry T. Mangurian Jr. | 1:36.00 | $75,000 | III | 1 mile |
| 1984 | Pleasure Cay | 4 | Robbie Davis | Del W. Carroll II | William S. Kilroy | 1:42.00 | $75,000 | III | 1 mile & 70 y |
| 1983 | Broom Dance | 4 | Gregg McCarron | James W. Maloney | Christiana Stables | 1:35.40 | $50,000 | III | 1 mile |
| 1982 | Who's To Answer | 4 | Eric Beitia | Michael Kay | Shirley H. Taylor | 1:36.60 | $50,000 | III | 1 mile |
| 1981 | Chain Bracelet | 4 | Frank Lovato Jr. | James W. Maloney | Shirley H. Taylor | 1:35.40 | $50,000 | III | 1 mile |
| 1980 | Misty Gallore | 4 | Don MacBeth | Thomas J. Kelly | Spring Hill Stable | 1:36.40 | $50,000 | III | 1 mile |
| 1979† | Lady Lonsdale | 4 | Cash Asmussen | Vincent Nocella | Pic Stable | 1:36.80 | $50,000 | III | 1 mile |
| 1979† | One Sum | 5 | Jeffrey Fell | Luis Barrera | Charles T. Wilson Jr. | 1:37.80 | $50,000 | III | 1 mile |
| 1978 | Fearless Queen | 5 | Michael Venezia | Louis Gaglial | Luigi Napolitano | 1:46.20 | $40,000 | III | 1 1/16 miles |
| 1977 | Shawi | 4 | Michael Venezia | Jose A. Martin | Mrs. Randolph Weinsier | 1:45.80 | $40,000 | III | 1 1/16 miles |
| 1976 | Imminence | 4 | Eddie Maple | John A. Nerud | Tartan Stable | 1:35.40 | $35,000 | III | 1 mile |
| 1975 | Shy Dawn | 4 | Daryl Montoya | Woodrow Sedlacek | Jacques D. Wimpfheimer | 1:36.20 | | III | 1 mile |
| 1974 | Klepto | 4 | Daryl Montoya | Jerome Hirsch | Leon J. Hekimian | 1:35.40 | | II | 1 mile |
| 1973 | Poker Night | 3 | Robert Woodhouse | H. Allen Jerkens | Hobeau Farm | 1:35.40 | | II | 1 mile |
| 1972 | Red Shoes | 4 | Anthony Loguercio | William H. Dixon | Adele L. Rand | 1:36.40 | | | 1 mile |
| 1971 | Office Queen | 4 | Chuck Baltazar | Budd Lepman | Stephen A. Calder | 1:36.80 | | | 1 mile |
| 1970 | Watch Fob | 5 | Heliodoro Gustines | Ivor G. Balding | C. V. Whitney | 1:36.80 | | | 1 mile |
| 1969 | Heartland | 4 | John L. Rotz | Max Hirsch | King Ranch | 1:35.80 | | | 1 mile |
| 1968 | Too Bald | 4 | Manuel Ycaza | William W. Stephens | Cain Hoy Stable | 1:35.00 | | | 1 mile |
| 1967 | Straight Deal II | 5 | Robert Ussery | Hirsch Jacobs | Ethel D. Jacobs | 1:37.60 | | | 1 mile |
| 1966 | Straight Deal II | 4 | Robert Ussery | Hirsch Jacobs | Ethel D. Jacobs | 1:35.80 | | | 1 mile |
| 1965 | Steeple Jill | 4 | John Ruane | Bert Mulholland | George D. Widener Jr. | 1:35.80 | | | 1 mile |
| 1964† | Spicy Living | 4 | Manuel Ycaza | Jimmy Rowe | Eleonora Sears | 1:38.60 | | | 1 mile |
| 1964† | Beauful | 5 | Walter Mayorga | H. Allen Jerkens | Hobeau Farm | 1:37.80 | | | 1 mile |
| 1963 | Royal Patrice | 4 | Ismael Valenzuela | Burley Parke | Harbor View Farm | 1:39.20 | | | 1 mile |
| 1962 | Seven Thirty | 4 | Larry Adams | Bert Mulholland | George D. Widener Jr. | 1:36.20 | | | 1 mile |
| 1961 | Prince's Gate | 4 | Eddie Arcaro | Horace A. Jones | Calumet Farm | 1:36.60 | | | 1 mile |
| 1960 | Chistosa | 5 | Hedley Woodhouse | Max Hirsch | King Ranch | 1:36.40 | | | 1 mile |
At Jamaica Race Course
| 1959 | Big Effort | 4 | Eldon Nelson | J. Elliott Burch | Brookmeade Stable | 1:44.20 | | | 1 1/16 miles |
| 1958 | Outer Space | 4 | William Boland | James W. Maloney | Mrs. Gerard S. Smith | 1:43.80 | | | 1 1/16 miles |
| 1957 | Little Pache | 4 | Conn McCreary | Frank E. Cundall | Ellis Farm | 1:47.00 | | | 1 1/16 miles |

Notes:

† Run in Divisions
