= William Ward Stephens =

American racehorse trainer

Personal information
- Born: November 21, 1922 Stanton, Kentucky, U.S.
- Died: July 10, 1987 (aged 64) New York City, New York, U.S.
- Occupation: Trainer

Horse racing career
- Sport: Horse racing

Major racing wins
- Daingerfield Handicap (1951); Roseben Handicap (1951); New Rochelle Handicap (1952); Arlington Classic (1957); Withers Stakes (1957); Shevlin Stakes (1957); Washington Park Handicap (1958); United Nations Handicap (1958); Woodward Stakes (1958); Palm Beach Handicap (1959); World's Playground Stakes (1961); Lamplighter Handicap (1962); Rumson Handicap (1962); Select Handicap (1962); Suffolk Downs Stakes (1962); Swift Stakes (1962); Futurity Stakes (1967); Bed O' Roses Handicap (1968); Barbara Fritchie Handicap (1968, 1969); Forerunner Purse (1968); Stepping Stone Purse (1968); Jim Dandy Stakes (1968)

Significant horses
- Captain's Gig, Clem, Delegate

William Ward "Bill" Stephens (November 21, 1922 – July 10, 1987) was an American Thoroughbred horse racing trainer. A younger brother to U.S. Racing Hall of Fame trainer, Woody Stephens, he was often referred to as "Bill" by the media.

Stephens began his career in racing as his brother's assistant at Royce Martin's Woodvale Farm in Kentucky. However, his career was interrupted during World War II when he served overseas with the United States Army. He resumed his career in racing at war's end and in 1950 succeeded John Nerud as head trainer for Herbert Woolf's Woolford Farm. In 1951 he saddled his first stakes race winner, when Champion Sprinter of 1949 Delegate won the Roseben Handicap at New York City's Belmont Park.

Bill Stephens went on to train for the stable owned by Adele L. Rand. For Mrs. Rand, he most notably conditioned Clem whose important wins included three straight over future Hall of Fame inductee, Round Table. Clem did it first in the September 1, 1958 Washington Park Handicap while setting a new track record time. The colt was then shipped all the way to the East Coast of the United States to the Atlantic City Race Course where on September 13 he set another new track record for a mile and three sixteenths on turf in winning the United Nations Handicap while again defeating Round Table. Clem then beat Round Table for the third time in a row on September 27 in the Woodward Stakes.

In the latter part of the 1960s, Bill Stephens took over from his brother as the trainer for Harry Guggenheim's Cain Hoy Stable. Among his successful Cain Hoy runners was the 1967 Futurity Stakes winner Captain's Gig who set a new Aqueduct track record. In 1958, en route to the Kentucky Derby the lightly raced colt won the Forerunner Purse at Keeneland then the Stepping Stone Purse at Churchill Downs.

Retired from racing, Bill Stephens was living in Franklin Square, New York when he died at age sixty-four of lung cancer at the Veterans Administration Hospital in Brooklyn, New York
