= Daingerfield Handicap =

- Class: Discontinued stakes
- Location: Jamaica Race Course, Jamaica, Queens, New York
- Inaugurated: 1941
- Race type: Thoroughbred – Flat racing

Race information
- Surface: Dirt
- Track: left-handed
- Qualification: Three years old and up

The Daingerfield Handicap was an American long distance Thoroughbred horse race held annually from 1941 through 1953 at Jamaica Race Course, Jamaica, Queens, New York. Run on dirt for horses age three and older, for the first two years it was contested at two miles after which the distance was set at two and one-sixteenth miles.

The race was created to honor Algernon Daingerfield, a Secretary of The Jockey Club for many years who had died on June 10, 1941.

== Historical notes ==
The inaugural running took place on October 25, 1941, at Empire City Race Track in Yonkers, New York. The two-mile event was won by Marshall Field's Piping Rock and was run at a distance of two miles. The race remained at Empire City for another year after which it was moved to the Jamaica Race Course in 1943 where the distance was increased to two miles and a sixteenth making it the longest race ever run at Jamaica.

In the 1950 edition of the Daingerfield Handicap, Canadian-born jockey Ted Atkinson rode Royal Castle to victory in a world record time of 3:30 4/5 for two and one-sixteenth miles on dirt.

The final running of the Daingerfield Handicap took place on November 11, 1953. It was won by a three-year-old colt named Guy with another Canadian-born jockey, Nick Wall, on board.

== Records ==
Speed record:

- 3:30 2/5 @ 2 1/16 miles: Royal Castle (1950) (new world record on dirt)

Most wins:

- no horse won this race more than once

Most wins by a jockey:

- 2 – Ted Atkinson (1945, 1950)

Most wins by a trainer:

- 2 – Sol Rutchick (1945, 1947)

Most wins by an owner:

- no owner won this race more than once

== Winners ==
Year	Winner	Age	Jockey	Trainer	Owner	Dist. (Miles)	Time	Win$
1953	Guy	3	Nick Wall	R. W. "Buster" Lilly	Mrs. Harry L. Nathenson	2 1/16	3:33.60	$19,625
1952	Mandingo	4	Hedley Woodhouse	Kay Erik Jensen	Mrs. H. P. Christiansen & Bland G. Jensen	2 1/16	3:35.60	$18,025
1951	Saxony	3	Conn McCreary	William Stephens	Woolford Farm	2 1/16	3:33.40	$21,250
1950	Royal Castle	3	Ted Atkinson	George W. Coburn	Joe M. Seider	2 1/16	3:30.40	$16,850
1949	Flying Missel	4	Eddie Arcaro	Max Hirsch	King Ranch	2 1/16	3:32.40	$15,050
1948	Phalanx	4	Shelby Clark	Sylvester Veitch	Sonny Whitney	2 1/16	3:35.80	$20,300
1947	Reckon	3	Earl Knapp	Sol Rutchick	Col. Edmund P. Bixer	2 1/16	3:37.20	$19,250
1946	Hachazo	5	Ruperto Donoso	Horatio Luro	Boone Hall Stable	2 1/16	3:35.60	$9,975
1945	Eurasian	5	Ted Atkinson	Sol Rutchick	Havaholme Stable (Frank & Joseph Rabinovich)	2 1/16	3:33.40	$6,700
1944	Baruna	5	Charles Wahler	Edward Coates	Mrs. C. E. Coates	2 1/16	3:34.40	$6,775
1943	Resolute II	5	Claude Erickson	J. T. Maloney	Mrs. E. J. Maloney	2 1/16	3:35.80	$5,075
1942	Bright Gallant	4	Alfred Robertson	Hirsch Jacobs	Isidor Bieber	2	3:27.40	$3,330
1941	Piping Rock	4	Tommy May	George M. Odom	Marshall Field III	2	3:27.00	$3,340

=== Past and present North American marathon races ===
On dirt:

- Annual Champion Stakes
- Display Handicap
- Empire City Gold Cup
- Gallant Fox Handicap
- Gallant Man Handicap
- Brooklyn Handicap
- Fort Harrod Stakes
- Tokyo City Cup
- Valedictory Stakes

On turf:

- American St. Leger Stakes
- Canadian International Stakes
- Carleton F. Burke Handicap
- San Juan Capistrano Handicap
