= T.V. Lark =

American-bred Thoroughbred racehorse

- Sire: Indian Hemp
- Grandsire: Nasrullah
- Dam: Miss Larksfly
- Damsire: Heelfly
- Sex: Stallion
- Foaled: February 12, 1957
- Country: USA
- Colour: Bay
- Breeder: Dr. Walter D. Lucas
- Owner: Chase R. McCoy
- Trainer: William Molter; Paul K. Parker
- Record: 72: 19-13-6
- Earnings: $902,194

Major wins
- Arlington Futurity (1959); California Derby (1960); Washington Park Handicap (1960); Arlington Classic (1960); American Derby (1960); Argonaut Handicap (1960); United Nations Handicap (1960); Santa Catalina Handicap (1961); Hawthorne Gold Cup Handicap (1961); Knickerbocker Handicap (1961); Washington, D.C. International (1961); Philadelphia Turf Handicap (1962)

Awards
- American Champion Male Turf Horse (1961); Leading sire in North America (1974)

T.V. Lark (February 12, 1957 – 1975) was an American Thoroughbred racehorse and sire. He was named the American Champion Turf Horse of 1961 after winning the Santa Catalina, Los Angeles, Hawthorne Gold Cup and Knickerbocker Handicaps and the Washington, D.C. International Stakes. He was also the leading sire in North America in 1974.

== Background ==
T.V. Lark was a bay horse bred in California by Dr. Walter D. Lucas. He was owned during his racing career by Chase McCoy of CR Mac Stables, and initially trained by U.S. Racing Hall of Fame member William Molter.

== Racing career ==
At age two, T.V. Lark won the Arlington Futurity (1959). In 1960, as a three-year-old, he won the California Derby, but on April 2, 1960, William Molter died unexpectedly of a heart attack and Paul Parker, a former groom of T.V. Lark, became his trainer. The horse did not run in the Kentucky Derby, and in the Preakness Stakes finished a disappointing 6th behind winner Bally Ache. However, he came back to win the 1960 Arlington Classic, the Washington Park Handicap and the Hawthorne Gold Cup Handicap. He defeated both Sword Dancer and Bally Ache in the 1960 United Nations Handicap.

In 1961, T.V. Lark won several top races and broke the track record on the turf while defeating the great Kelso in the prestigious Washington, D.C. International. T.V. Lark's performances in 1961 saw him named that year's American Champion Male Turf Horse.

== Stud career ==
T.V. Lark was retired to stand at stud at owner Preston Madden's Hamburg Place farm in Lexington, Kentucky. A descendant of the great sire Nearco, T.V. Lark was the leading sire in the United States in 1974 when his progeny won 121 races. T.V. Lark was the damsire of the Hall of Fame filly Chris Evert.

T.V. Lark died in 1975 at age 18 and was buried in the equine cemetery at Hamburg Place.

== Pedigree ==
Pedigree of T.V. Lark, bay horse, foaled February 12, 1957
| Sire Indian Hemp | Nasrullah | Nearco (ITY) | Pharos (GB) |
| Sire Indian Hemp | Nasrullah | Nearco (ITY) | Nogara (ITY) |
| Sire Indian Hemp | Nasrullah | Mumtaz Begum (FR) | Blenheim II |
| Sire Indian Hemp | Nasrullah | Mumtaz Begum (FR) | Mumtaz Mahal (GB) |
| Sire Indian Hemp | Sabzy | Stardust (GB) | Hyperion (GB) |
| Sire Indian Hemp | Sabzy | Stardust (GB) | Sister Stella (GB) |
| Sire Indian Hemp | Sabzy | Sarita (GB) | Swynford (GB) |
| Sire Indian Hemp | Sabzy | Sarita (GB) | Molly Desmond (GB) |
| Dam Miss Larksfly | Heelfly | Royal Ford | Swynford (GB) |
| Dam Miss Larksfly | Heelfly | Royal Ford | Royal Yoke |
| Dam Miss Larksfly | Heelfly | Canfli | Campfire |
| Dam Miss Larksfly | Heelfly | Canfli | Flivver |
| Dam Miss Larksfly | Larksnest | Bull Dog (FR) | Teddy |
| Dam Miss Larksfly | Larksnest | Bull Dog (FR) | Plucky Liege (GB) |
| Dam Miss Larksfly | Larksnest | Light Lark | Blue Larkspur |
| Dam Miss Larksfly | Larksnest | Light Lark | Ruddy Light (family 9-c) |
