= Crafty Admiral =

American-bred Thoroughbred racehorse

- Sire: Fighting Fox
- Grandsire: Sir Gallahad III
- Dam: Admiral's Lady
- Damsire: War Admiral
- Sex: Stallion
- Foaled: 1948
- Country: United States
- Colour: Bay
- Breeder: Harry F. Guggenheim
- Owner: 1) Hugh A. Grant; 2) Charfran Stable (Charles & Frances Cohen)
- Trainer: 1) Bert Williams; 2) Robert Odom
- Record: 39: 18-6-4
- Earnings: US$499,200

Major wins
- Brooklyn Handicap (1952); Palm Beach Handicap (1952); Merchants and Citizens Handicap (1952); Whirlaway Handicap (1952); Washington Park Handicap (1952); Gulfstream Park Handicap (1952, 1953); McLennan Handicap (1953); Olympic Handicap (1953); New York Handicap (1953); Royal Palm Handicap (1953); Empire City Gold Cup (1953)

Awards
- American Champion Older Male Horse (1952); Leading broodmare sire in North America (1978)

Crafty Admiral (June 6, 1948 – 1972) was an American Thoroughbred racehorse who was the 1952 American Champion Older Male Horse and Leading broodmare sire in North America in 1978.

== Background ==
A very late foal, Crafty Admiral's dam, Admiral's Lady, died after producing the colt. He was purchased for $6,500 as a yearling by Hugh Grant at a special auction of Harry Guggenheim horses held in the paddock at Belmont Park. In late 1951, Grant sold him to Charles and Frances Cohen, a husband-and-wife team who raced under the name of Charfran Stable.

== Racing career ==
Crafty Admiral set a new track record for seven furlongs in winning the 1952 Palm Beach Handicap at Hialeah Park Race Track.

== At stud ==
Retired to stud in Kentucky in 1954, Crafty Admiral sired twenty-six stakes winners, including Crafty Lace, Crafty Khale and Admiral's Voyage who was the damsire of Danzig. Through his daughter, Won't Tell You, he is the damsire of 1978 U.S. Triple Crown champion Affirmed whose earnings helped make Crafty Admiral that year's Leading broodmare sire in North America.

== Pedigree ==
Pedigree of Crafty Admiral
Sire Fighting Fox	Sir Gallahad	Teddy	Ajax
Sire Fighting Fox	Sir Gallahad	Teddy	Rondeau
Sire Fighting Fox	Sir Gallahad	Plucky Liege	Spearmint
Sire Fighting Fox	Sir Gallahad	Plucky Liege	Concertina
Sire Fighting Fox	Marguerite	Celt	Commando
Sire Fighting Fox	Marguerite	Celt	Maid of Erin
Sire Fighting Fox	Marguerite	Fairy Ray	Radium
Sire Fighting Fox	Marguerite	Fairy Ray	Seraph
Dam Admiral's Lady	War Admiral	Man o' War	Fair Play
Dam Admiral's Lady	War Admiral	Man o' War	Mahubah
Dam Admiral's Lady	War Admiral	Brushup	Sweep
Dam Admiral's Lady	War Admiral	Brushup	Annette K.
Dam Admiral's Lady	Boola Brook	Bull Dog	Teddy
Dam Admiral's Lady	Boola Brook	Bull Dog	Plucky Liege
Dam Admiral's Lady	Boola Brook	Brookdale	Peter Pan
Dam Admiral's Lady	Boola Brook	Brookdale	Sweepaway
