= Arlington Classic =

Arlington Classic Stakes
- Class: Grade III
- Location: Arlington Park; Arlington Heights, Illinois, United States
- Inaugurated: 1929 as Classic Stakes
- Race type: Thoroughbred – Flat racing
- Website: Arlington Park

Race information
- Distance: 1 1/16 miles
- Surface: Turf
- Track: Left-handed
- Qualification: Three-year-olds
- Weight: Scale Weight
- Purse: $100,000

The Arlington Classic Stakes is a Grade III American Thoroughbred horse race for three year old horses over a distance of 1 1/16 miles on the turf held annually in late May at Arlington Park race track near Chicago.

== History ==
The event was inaugurated in 1929 as the Classic Stakes over a distance of 1 1/4 miles on the dirt.

At one time the Arlington Classic was one of the most important races in the United States, drawing the best 3-year-olds in the country. Triple Crown winner Gallant Fox attracted a crowd of 60,000 in 1930 and he continued his six race winning streak in the event. In 1932 when Gusto, a grandson of the great Man o' War won, it was then the richest race for 3-year-olds in America with a purse of $88,100. A noteworthy upset in the Arlington Classic occurred in 1946 when Assault, who had just won the United States Triple Crown, finished last.

The Arlington Classic was run at the now defunct Washington Park Racetrack from 1943 through 1945. It was known as the Grand Prix Stakes in 1971, 1972 and 1973 and in 1977 it was made open to horses three-year-olds and up as was labelled as the Arlington Classic Invitational Handicap. There was no race held in 1974, 1975, 1976, 1988, 1998 and 1999.

The Arlington Classic became part of Arlington Park's "Mid-America Triple" which included the American Derby in July and the Secretariat Stakes in August. The Triple was last won by Honor Glide in 1997.

The event held a Grade I classification between 1981 and 1989.

In 2007, this Grade III stakes race was downgraded to an ungraded stakes by the American Graded Stakes Committee, but it has been returned to its Grade III status.

The Arlington Classic was raced on dirt from 1929–1973, 1977–1987, 1989–1993.

=== Distance ===
Since its inception, the Arlington Classic has been contested over a variety of distances:

- 1929–1951 – 1 1/4 miles (dirt)
- 1952–1972 – 1 mile (dirt)
- 1973 – 1 1/16 miles (dirt)
- 1977–1979 – 1 1/4 miles (dirt)
- 1980–1993 – 1 1/8 miles (dirt)
- 1994–2001 – 1 1/8 miles (turf)
- 2001 onwards – 1 1/16 miles (turf)

== Records ==
Speed record: (at current 1 1/16 miles distance)

- 1:41.87 – Silver Max (2012)

Largest margin of victory:

- 13 lengths – Alydar (1978)

Most wins by an owner:

- 4 – Belair Stud
- 3 – Calumet Farm

Most wins by a jockey:

- 6 – Pat Day
- 4 – Braulio Baeza, René Douglas

Most wins by a trainer:

- 4 – Sunny Jim Fitzsimmons
- 3 – Ben A. Jones, William I. Mott, Max Hirsch

== Winners ==
Year	Winner	Jockey	Trainer	Owner	Time	Purse	Grade
Arlington Classic Stakes
2018	Ezmosh	Jose Valdivia Jr.	Brad H. Cox	Madaket Stables, Zayat Stables, Ten Strike Racing	1:45.52	$100,000	III
2017	Cowboy Culture	Shaun Bridgmohan	Brad H. Cox	Head of Plains Partners/Cheyenne Stables	1:46.81	$100,000	III
2016	Surgical Strike	James Graham	Ben Colebrook	Seltzer/Anderson	1:47.51	$100,000	III
2015	Race not held						
2014	¶Istanford	James Graham	Michael Stidham	Thrash/Alley	1:43.60	$150,000	III
2013	General Election	Joseph Rocco Jr.	Kellyn Gorder	WinStar Farm	1:45.48	$150,000	III
2012	Silver Max	Shaun Bridgmohan	Dale Romans	Bacon/Wells	1:41.87	$125,000	Listed
2011	Willcox Inn	Robby Albarado	Michael Stidham	All In Stable	1:49.51	$100,000	Listed
2010	Workin for Hops	Robby Albarado	Michael Stidham	Estrorace LLC	1:45.43	$100,000	Listed
2009	Giant Oak	Eusebio Razo Jr.	Chris M. Block	Virginia H. Tarra Trust	1:43.59	$150,000	Listed
2008	Meal Penalty	José Vélez Jr.	Todd Pletcher	Sassafras Racing/Gulf Coast Farms	1:41.97	$150,000	Listed
2007	Pleasant Strike	René Douglas	Todd A. Pletcher	Edward P. Evans	1:42.05	$150,000	III
2006	Kingship	Robby Albarado	Ronny Werner	Oxbow Racing	1:43.57	$150,000	III
2005	Purim	Mark Guidry	Thomas F. Proctor	Edward J. Sukley	1:42.65	$150,000	III
2004	Toasted	René Douglas	Laura de Seroux	Sidney L. Port	1:50.91	$200,000	II
2003	Lismore Knight	René Douglas	Todd A. Pletcher	J. J. Pletcher & B. Simon	1:42.73	$175,000	II
2002	Mr. Mellon	René Douglas	W. Elliott Walden	WinStar Farm/T. Van Meter II	1:41.95	$175,000	II
2001	Baptize	Mark Guidry	William I. Mott	Mary & Gary West	1:48.80	$200,000	II
2000	King Cugat	Robby Albarado	William I. Mott	Centennial Farms	1:48.16	$150,000	II
1998–99	Race not held						
1997	Honor Glide	Garrett Gomez	Jim Day	Robert Schaedle III	1:47.59	$125,000	II
1996	Trail City	Pat Day	William I. Mott	W. I. Mott & R. Verchota	1:48.61	$200,000	II
1995	Hawk Attack	Pat Day	W. Elliott Walden	Cavalier Stable	1:48.04	$200,000	II
1994	Eagle Eyed	Corey Nakatani	Robert J. Frankel	Juddmonte Farms	1:48.46	$300,000	II
1993	Boundlessly	Pat Day	Jere R. Smith Jr.	Panic Stable	1:49.89	$300,000	II
1992	Saint Ballado	Julie Krone	Clint Goodrich	Lothenbach/Herold/Goodrich	1:46.82	$300,000	II
1991	Whadjathink	Jorge Velásquez	Michael Whittingham	Richard L. Duchossois	1:49.18	$300,000	II
Arlington Classic
1990	Sound Of Cannons	Pat Day	George R. Arnold II	B. Wilkinson/L.G. Robey	1:47.60	$250,000	II
1989	Clever Trevor	Don Pettinger	Donnie K. Von Hemel	D. C. McNeil	1:49.40	$200,000	I
1988	Race not held						
1987	Lost Code	Gene St. Leon	L. William Donovan	Wendover Stable	1:49.60	$150,000	I
1986	Sumptious	Randy Romero	Phil Hauswald	John A. Bell III	1:49.40	$100,000	I
1985	Smile	Jacinto Vásquez	Frank Gomez	Frances A. Genter	1:51.20	$150,000	I
1984	At The Threshold	Pat Day	Lynn S. Whiting	W. Cal Partee	1:50.20	$100,000	I
1983	Play Fellow	Pat Day	Harvey L. Vanier	Vanier, Lauer, Victor	1:49.00	$100,000	I
1982	Wolfie's Rascal	Ángel Cordero Jr.	Howard Tesher	Sidney L. Port et al.	1:49.00	$125,000	I
1981	Fairway Phantom	John L. Lively	Carl Nafzger	William H. Floyd	1:53.40	$125,000	I
1980	Spruce Needles	Mike Morgan	Smiley Adams	Golden Chance Farm	1:49.20	$125,000	II
1979	Steady Growth	Brian Swatuk	John J. Tammaro Jr.	Kinghaven Farm	2:00.60	$100,000	II
1978	Alydar	Jeffrey Fell	John M. Veitch	Calumet Farm	2:00.40	$100,000	II
Arlington Classic Handicap
1977	Private Thoughts	Ramon Perez	Greg Sanders	Sandera Farm	1:59.40	$150,000	Listed
1974–76	Race not held						
Grand Prix Stakes
1973	Linda's Chief	Braulio Baeza	Al Scotti	Neil Hellman	1:44.60		III
1972	King's Bishop	Eddie Maple	Thomas J. Kelly	Craig F. Cullinan Jr.	1:35.00		
1971	Son Ange	Chuck Baltazar	Reggie Cornell	Calumet Farm	1:36.00		
Arlington Classic
1970	Corn Off The Cob	Eddie Belmonte	Arnold N. Winick	Fence Post Farm	1:35.40		
1969	Ack Ack	Braulio Baeza	Frank A. Bonsal	Cain Hoy Stable	1:34.40		
1968	Exclusive Native	Ismael Valenzuela	Ivan H. Parke	Harbor View Farm	1:36.00		
1967	Dr. Fager	Braulio Baeza	John A. Nerud	Tartan Stable	1:36.00		
1966	Buckpasser	Braulio Baeza	Edward A. Neloy	Ogden Phipps	1:32.60		
1965	Tom Rolfe	Bill Shoemaker	Frank Y. Whiteley Jr.	Powhatan Stable	1:34.80		
1964	¶Tosmah	Sam Boulmetis Sr.	Joseph Mergler	Anthony Imbesi	1:36.20		
1963	Candy Spots	Bill Shoemaker	Mesh Tenney	Rex C. Ellsworth	1:35.80		
1962	Ridan	Avelino Gomez	LeRoy Jolley	J. G. W. Stable	1:38.00		
1961	Globemaster	John L. Rotz	Thomas J. Kelly	Leonard P. Sasso	1:35.40		
1960	T. V. Lark	Johnny Sellers	Paul K. Parker	C. R. Mac Stable	1:36.20		
1959	Dunce	Lois C. Cook	Moody Jolley	Claiborne Farm	1:35.00		
1958	A Dragon Killer	Jimmy Combest	Norman L. Haymaker	Mrs. S. Helene Sadacca	1:36.40		
1957	Clem	Conn McCreary	William W. Stephens	Adele L. Rand	1:36.60		
1956	Swoon's Son	David Erb	Lex Wilson	E. G. Drake	1:36.80		
1955	Nashua	Eddie Arcaro	James E. Fitzsimmons	Belair Stud	1:35.20		
1954	Errard King	Sam Boulmetis Sr.	Thomas J. Barry	Joseph Gavegnano	1:35.00		
1953	Native Dancer	Eric Guerin	William C. Winfrey	Alfred G. Vanderbilt II	1:38.00		
1952	Mark-Ye-Well	Eddie Arcaro	Ben A. Jones	Calumet Farm	1:39.20		
1951	Hall Of Fame	Ted Atkinson	John M. Gaver Sr.	Greentree Stable	2:03.20		
1950	Greek Song	Ovie Scurlock	Virgil W. Raines	Brandywine Stable	2:01.80		
1949	Ponder	Steve Brooks	Horace A. Jones	Calumet Farm	2:03.20		
1948	Papa Redbird	Robert L. Baird	John M. Goode	J. A. Goodwin	2:03.00		
1947	¶But Why Not	Warren Mehrtens	Max Hirsch	King Ranch	2:01.80		
1946	The Dude	Melvin Duhon	Al Gaal	Mrs. Al Gaal	2:02.60		
†1945	Pot O'Luck	Douglas Dodson	Ben A. Jones	Calumet Farm	2:05.80		
†1944	¶Twilight Tear	Leon Haas	Ben A. Jones	Calumet Farm	2:03.60		
†1943	Slide Rule	Ferril Zufelt	Cecil Wilhelm	William E. Boeing	2:04.60		
1942	Shut Out	Eddie Arcaro	John M. Gaver Sr.	Greentree Stable	2:01.40		
1941	Attention	Carroll Bierman	Max Hirsch	Mrs. Parker Corning	2:02.80		
1940	Sirocco	George Woolf	James W. Smith	Dixiana Farm	2:03.00		
1939	Challedon	Harry Richards	Louis Schaefer	William L. Brann	2:02.00		
1938	Nedayr	Wayne D. Wright	William A. Crawford	Willis Sharpe Kilmer	2:06.20		
1937	Flying Scot	John Gilbert	James W. Healy	John Hay Whitney	2:05.80		
1936	Granville	James Stout	James E. Fitzsimmons	Belair Stud	2:03.20		
1935	Omaha	Wayne D. Wright	James E. Fitzsimmons	Belair Stud	2:01.40		
1934	Cavalcade	Mack Garner	Robert A. Smith	Brookmeade Stable	2:02.80		
1933	Inlander	Robert Jones	Robert A. Smith	Brookmeade Stable	2:02.00		
1932	Gusto	Silvio Coucci	Max Hirsch	Morton L. Schwartz	2:03.60	$88,100	
1931	Mate	Alfred Robertson	James W. Healy	Albert C. Bostwick Jr.	2:02.40		
1930	Gallant Fox	Earl Sande	James E. Fitzsimmons	Belair Stud	2:03.80	$78,750	
Classic Stakes
1929	Blue Larkspur	Mack Garner	Herbert J. Thompson	Edward R. Bradley	2:14.40		

Legend:
Turf Dirt Idle Race name
Notes:
¶ Filly
† Held at Washington Park Race Track
