= Nick Wall =

Canadian jockey (1906–1983)

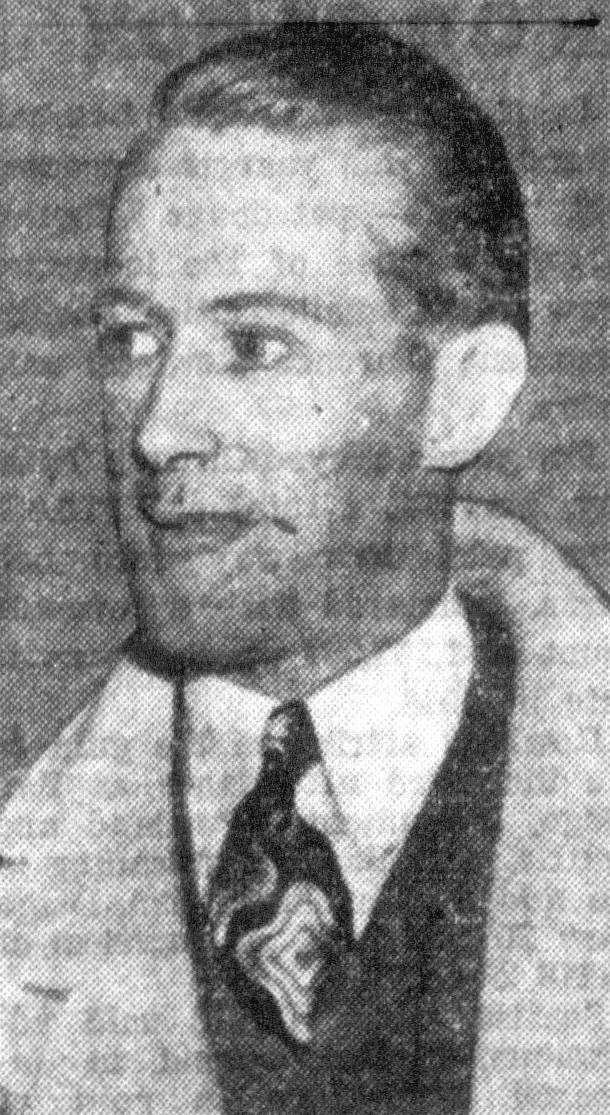
- Wall, circa 1949

Personal information
- Born: December 18, 1906 Conception Bay, Newfoundland Colony
- Died: March 17, 1983 (aged 76)
- Occupation: Jockey

Horse racing career
- Sport: Horse racing
- Career wins: 1,419

Major racing wins
- King Edward Gold Cup (1928); Roger Williams Handicap (1935); Bowie Handicap (1937); Delaware Handicap (1937); Saratoga Handicap (1937); Whitney Handicap (1937); Wilson Stakes (1937); Butler Handicap (1938, 1939); Champlain Handicap (1938); Cowdin Stakes (1938); Dover Stakes (1938); Fleetwing Handicap (1938); Great American Stakes (1938); Hawthorne Gold Cup (1938); Hopeful Stakes (1938); Jamaica Handicap (1938); Junior Champion Stakes (1938); Laurel Handicap (1938); Narragansett Special (1938); Massachusetts Handicap (1938); Santa Anita Handicap (1938, 1941); Saratoga Special Stakes (1938); United States Hotel Stakes (1938); Youthful Stakes (1938); Coaching Club American Oaks (1939); Empire City Handicap (1939, 1950); Toboggan Handicap (1939); Washington Park Handicap (1940); Astoria Stakes (1941); Aqueduct Handicap (1941); Excelsior Handicap (1941); Seminole Handicap (1942, 1946); Valley Forge Handicap (1943, 1953); William Penn Stakes (1943, 1950); San Diego Handicap (1946); Demoiselle Stakes (1950); San Luis Obispo Handicap (1951); Edgemere Handicap (1952); Saranac Handicap (1952); Daingerfield Handicap (1953); Tremont Stakes (1953)

Racing awards
- United States Champion Jockey by earnings (1938)

Honours
- Canada's Sports Hall of Fame (1979)

Significant horses
- El Chico, Esposa, Stagehand, Menow, Jacola

Nicholas J. Wall (December 18, 1906 – March 17, 1983) was a Newfoundland Colony born jockey who competed successfully in Canada and was the 1938 National Champion rider in the United States.

Born in Lower Gully, Kelligrews, Conception Bay, Newfoundland Colony, while still a small boy Nick Wall's family moved to Glace Bay, Nova Scotia. A coal mining town, the diminutive Wall work in the mines as a pony rider. He began his professional jockey career in 1926 and in 1928 scored his first major win in the King Edward Gold Cup at Woodbine Park Racetrack in Toronto. Riding principally in the United States, over the course of his career, Nick Wall had mounts in each of the American Classic Races with his best result in the Kentucky Derby coming in 1936 when he rode Coldstream to a fourth-place finish.

In 1938, Wall had his best year when he was the United States Champion Jockey by earnings. That year he won numerous important races at tracks in the New York and Boston area but earned national headlines for riding Stagehand to a victory over Seabiscuit in the Santa Anita Handicap at Arcadia, California.

Nick Wall continued to race successfully but a serious injury sustained in a 1945 race diminished his riding skills. At the time of his retirement in 1957 he had made 11,164 starts, earning 1,419 firsts, 1,305 seconds, plus 1,352 third-place finishes.

In 1940, Nick appeared in Monogram Pictures Corporation production of That Gang of Mine. He portrayed Jockey Jimmy Sullivan.

In 1979, Nick Wall was Inducted in Canada's Sports Hall of Fame and the Sport Newfoundland and Labrador Hall of Fame. He died in Bellerose, New York in 1983 at age seventy-six.

== Filmography ==
- That Gang of Mine (1940) as Jockey Jimmy Sullivan (uncredited)
