= John A. Nerud =

American racehorse trainer and owner

Personal information
- Full name: John Andrew Nerud
- Born: February 9, 1913 Minatare, Nebraska, U.S.
- Died: August 13, 2015 (aged 102) Old Brookville, New York, U.S.
- Occupations: Trainer & Owner

Horse racing career
- Sport: Horse racing
- Career wins: 1,000+

Major racing wins
- Hialeah Inaugural Handicap (1949); Seminole Handicap (1949, 1962); New Rochelle Handicap (1949); Spinaway Stakes (1951); Palm Beach Handicap (1956, 1957, 1962, 1964); McLennan Handicap (1956); Hibiscus Stakes (1957); Travers Stakes (1957); Peter Pan Stakes (1957); Jockey Club Gold Cup (1957); Royal Palm Handicap (1957, 1975); Hollywood Gold Cup (1958); Metropolitan Handicap (1958); Test Stakes (1960, 1969); Black Helen Handicap (1961); Bay Shore Stakes (1962); Bernard Baruch Handicap (1964); Fall Highweight Handicap (1965); Cowdin Stakes (1966); Arlington Classic (1967); Withers Stakes (1967); Hawthorne Gold Cup (1967); Gotham Stakes (1967); Man O' War Stakes (1967); Vosburgh Stakes (1967, 1968, 1978); Canadian Turf Handicap (1967); Adirondack Stakes (1967); Suburban Handicap (1968); United Nations Handicap (1964, 1968); Whitney Handicap (1968); Gallorette Handicap (1968)); Jasmine Stakes (1969); Prioress Stakes (1969); Comely Stakes (1969); Miss Woodford Stakes (1969); Demoiselle Stakes (1974); Gazelle Handicap (1975); Diana Handicap (1975); Bed O' Roses Handicap (1976); Questionnaire Handicap (1978); Paterson Handicap (1978); Meadowlands Cup Handicap (1978); U.S. Triple Crown wins: Belmont Stakes (1957) Selected wins as an owner: Metropolitan Handicap (1981); Wood Memorial Stakes (1984); Breeders' Cup Mile (1985); Longfellow Handicap (1985); Oceanport Handicap (1985); Fall Highweight Handicap (1986); Top Flight Handicap (1988)

Racing awards
- Big Sport of Turfdom Award (1968); Eclipse Award of Merit (2006)

Honours
- National Museum of Racing and Hall of Fame (1972)

Significant horses
- Delegate, Gallant Man, Intentionally, Dr. Fager, Ta Wee, Dr. Patches, Fappiano, Cozzene

John Andrew Nerud (February 9, 1913 – August 13, 2015) was an American thoroughbred horse trainer and owner, who was inducted in the National Museum of Racing and Hall of Fame in 1972.

== Early years ==
Nerud, who was born on a ranch in Minatare, Nebraska, worked as a rodeo cowboy, groom and most notably as a trainer during his youth. Prior to serving in World War II, he was the agent for Hall of Fame jockey Ted Atkinson in New England. He served with the United States Navy during the war, then returned to racing as an assistant to Frank J. Kearns at Woolford Farm. He eventually took over from Kearns and in 1949 trained his first Champion when Delegate earned American Co-Champion Sprint Horse honors.

== Career ==
Nerud spent the bulk of his 44-year training career (1935–1978) as a trainer, president and general manager for William L. McKnight's Tartan Farms in Ocala, Florida. When Nerud retired from training in 1978, he remained at Tartan as manager of racing and breeding.

As a trainer, Nerud first drew national attention in 1956 after prepping Switch On to win the Palm Beach and McLennan Handicaps. The following season, in 1957, Nerud lost the Kentucky Derby by a nose to Iron Liege after jockey Bill Shoemaker, aboard Gallant Man, misjudged the finish line. Gallant Man later defeated Bold Ruler in a record-breaking Belmont Stakes.

Nerud's most acclaimed runner was Hall of Fame inductee Dr. Fager. In 1968 Dr. Fager became the only thoroughbred to win four Championships in one year: Sprinter, Turf Horse, Handicap Horse and Horse of the Year. In addition to Delegate, Nerud trained champions Intentionally (1959 Sprinter) Ta Wee (1969, 1970 Sprinter and also a Hall of Fame inductee) and Dr. Patches (1978 co-Sprinter). Overall, he is credited with saddling over 1,000 winners including 27 stakes winners.

Nerud helped develop Tartan’s racing and breeding operations. Tartan stood Dr. Fager, Intentionally, In Reality, Hold Your Peace, Codex and Smile. Nerud also bred and owned Fappiano, the sire of Unbridled.[3]

== Founding director of Breeders' Cup ==
During the early 1980s, Nerud assisted in the early development of the Breeders' Cup, helping founder John R. Gaines to sell the concept to horsemen across the nation. As a founding member, Nerud also served as chairman of the Breeders' Cup marketing committee in its formative years. In 1985 Nerud won the Breeders' Cup Mile with his homebred Cozzene, who was trained by his son Jan. Cozzene was voted the 1985 Eclipse Award for Outstanding Male Turf Horse.

== Personal life ==
Nerud's wife of 68 years, Charlotte, died on August 28, 2009. John was a resident of Old Brookville, New York, and turned 100 in February 2013. Nerud remained a director emeritus of Breeders' Cup, Ltd. until his death. Nerud died on August 13, 2015, at the age of 102.
