= Ted Atkinson =

Canadian-born American jockey

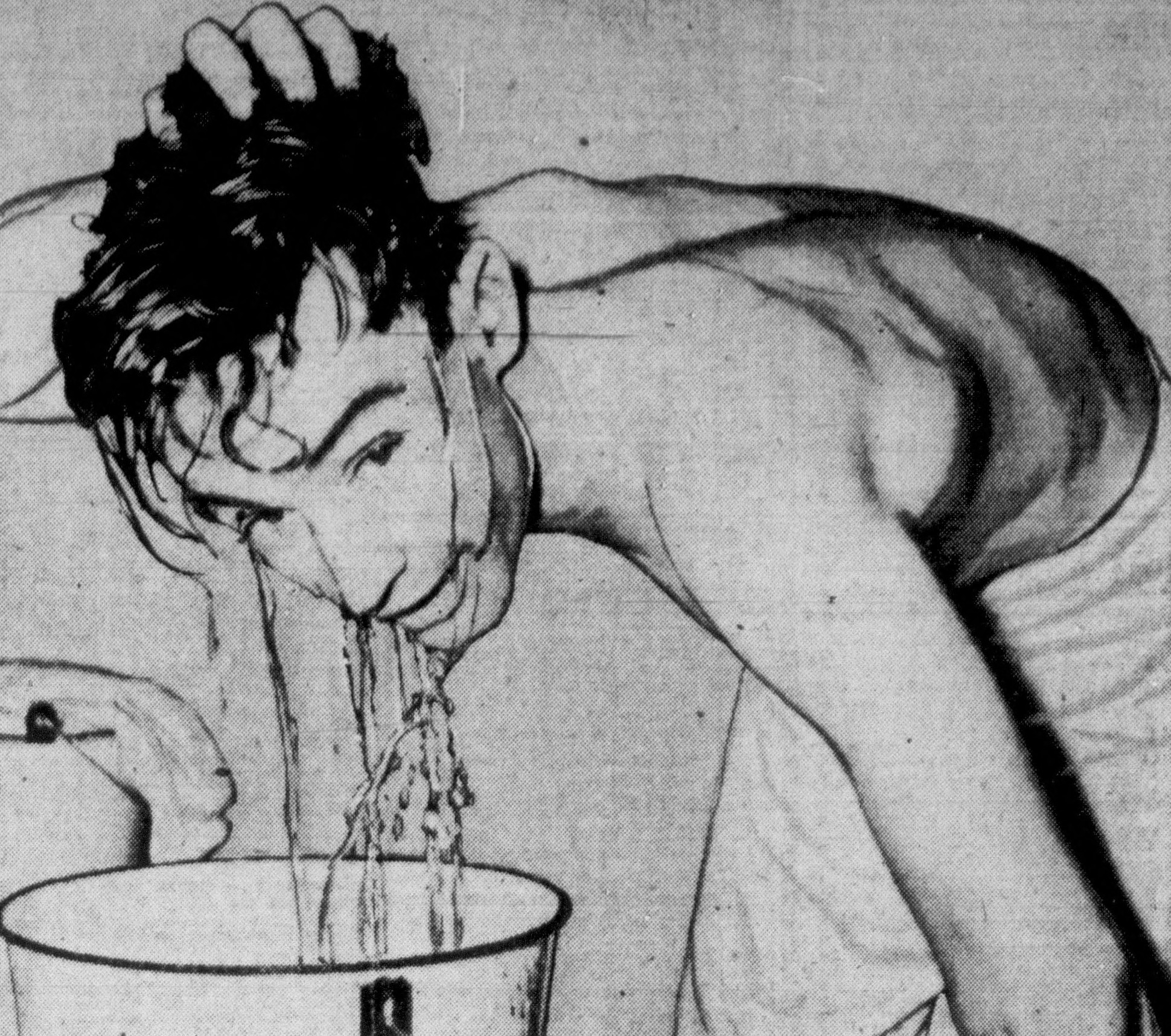
- Atkinson, c. 1946

Personal information
- Born: June 17, 1916 Toronto, Ontario, Canada
- Died: May 5, 2005 (aged 88) Beaverdam, Virginia, US
- Occupation: Jockey

Horse racing career
- Sport: Horse racing
- Career wins: 3,795

Major racing wins
- Massachusetts Handicap (1941, 1951); Narragansett Special (1941, 1951, 1956); Roger Williams Handicap (1941); Fashion Stakes (1942, 1953, 1955); Astoria Stakes (1943, 1948); Champagne Stakes (1943, 1948); Matron Stakes (1943, 1948); National Stallion Stakes (1943); Sanford Stakes (1943, 1949, 1951, 1956); Shevlin Stakes (1943, 1944, 1945, 1947, 1950); Beldame Stakes (1944, 1947); Black Helen Handicap (1944); Cowdin Stakes (1944, 1948); Dwyer Stakes (1944, 1945, 1948, 1956); Hialeah Turf Cup Handicap (1944); Ladies Handicap (1944, 1946, 1947, 1948); McLennan Handicap (1944, 1949); Metropolitan Handicap (1944, 1945, 1953); New York Handicap (1944, 1954); Paumonok Handicap (1944, 1951); Top Flight Handicap (1944, 1947); Tremont Stakes (1944); Vosburgh Stakes (1944, 1946, 1953); Wilson Stakes (1944, 1951, 1952, 1953, 1954); Youthful Stakes (1944, 1945, 1948, 1956); Alabama Stakes (1945, 1948, 1952); Daingerfield Handicap (1945, 1950); East View Stakes (1945, 1951); Test Stakes (1945, 1957); Lawrence Realization Stakes (1946, 1948, 1956); Santa Barbara Handicap (1946); Santa Maria Handicap (1946); Travers Stakes (1946, 1948); Excelsior Stakes (1947); Peter Pan Stakes (1947); Brooklyn Handicap (1948, 1950, 1953); Edgemere Handicap (1948, 1951); Laurel Futurity Stakes (1948, 1950); Manhattan Handicap (1948, 1950, 1956); Palm Beach Handicap (1948, 1949); Remsen Stakes (1948); Saratoga Handicap (1948, 1952, 1958); Vagrancy Handicap (1948); Belmont Futurity Stakes (1949, 1951); Chesapeake Stakes (1949); Diana Stakes (1949, 1952, 1955); Empire City Gold Cup (1949); Jerome Stakes (1949, 1952); Pimlico Special (1949, 1953); Queens County Handicap (1949, 1955); Saratoga Cup (1949, 1952); Spinaway Stakes (1949, 1955); Sysonby Handicap (1949, 1952, 1953); Widener Handicap (1949); Acorn Stakes (1950); Breeders' Futurity Stakes (1950); Carter Handicap (1950, 1951, 1952, 1953, 1957); American Derby (1951); Arlington Classic (1951); Everglades Stakes (1951, 1954); Juvenile Stakes (1951); Monmouth Oaks (1951); Palos Verdes Handicap (1951); Prioress Stakes (1951); Questionnaire Handicap (1951); Whitney Handicap (1951, 1953); Discovery Handicap (1952); Frizette Stakes (1952, 1953); Empire City Handicap (1952); Monmouth Handicap (1952); Santa Anita Derby (1952); Suburban Handicap (1952, 1953, 1954); Adirondack Stakes (1953); Butler Handicap (1953); Delaware Handicap (1953); Miss Woodford Stakes (1953); Firenze Handicap (1954); American Legion Handicap (1955); Coaching Club American Oaks (1955); Providence Stakes (1955); Wood Memorial Stakes (1955); Bahamas Stakes (1957); Jamaica Handicap (1957); Saranac Stakes (1957); Gallant Fox Handicap (1958); National Stallion Stakes (filly division) (1958); U.S. Triple Crown race wins: Preakness Stakes (1949); Belmont Stakes (1949)

Racing awards
- U. S. Champion Jockey by earnings (1944, 1946); U.S. Champion Jockey by wins (1944, 1946); George Woolf Memorial Jockey Award (1957)

Honours
- United States Racing Hall of Fame (1957); Canadian Horse Racing Hall of Fame (2002)

Significant horses
- Ace Admiral, Bold Ruler, Busanda, Capot, Coaltown, Conniver, Devil Diver, Gallorette, Grecian Queen, Honeymoon, Miss Request, Misty Morn, Nashua, One Hitter, Parlo, Tom Fool, War Relic, Windfields
- Updated on August 1, 2018

Theodore Frederick Atkinson (June 17, 1916 – May 5, 2005) was a Canadian-born American thoroughbred horse racing jockey, inducted into the National Museum of Racing and Hall of Fame in 1957.

Born in Toronto, Ontario, Canada. His sister was Ruth Atkinson Ford. Ted Atkinson as a child emigrated with his family across the border to upstate New York. He began his career in thoroughbred horse racing in 1938 and first gained national recognition in 1941, when he rode War Relic to an upset win in the Narragansett Special over the 1941 U.S. Triple Crown winner Whirlaway. For 12 of his 21 years in the sport, Atkinson was contract rider for the wealthy New York City Whitney family's Greentree Stable. In 1944, he was North America's leading jockey in both number of wins and money earned. He repeated the feat in 1946, when he became the first rider to achieve purse earnings of more the $1 million in a single season.

Riding Greentree's colt Capot, Atkinson just missed winning the U.S. triple Crown in 1949 when he finished second in the Kentucky Derby then won both the Preakness and the Belmont Stakes. Capot shared Horse of the Year honors with Coaltown, after beating the older horse in the Pimlico Special. Atkinson was also the jockey for all of Hall of Famer Tom Fool's races, guiding the colt to a perfect season of 10 wins in 10 starts, including the New York Handicap Triple and winning the Horse of the Year honors in 1953.

In 1957, Ted Atkinson was voted the George Woolf Memorial Jockey Award and that same year became the first active jockey elected to the National Museum of Racing and Hall of Fame. He was then invited to appear on the CBS television's The Ed Sullivan Show. In an article on jockey Eddie Arcaro, TIME magazine wrote that: "He [Arcaro] also gives a large share of credit to gentlemanly Jockey Ted Atkinson, who helped raise the standard of sportsmanship on New York tracks."

Following his retirement in 1959 as a result of a back injury, Atkinson became a racing official and served as State Steward in Illinois from 1961 until 1976.

Atkinson, who had been fighting a lengthy cancer-related illness, died at his home near Beaverdam, Virginia after several strokes, a few weeks short of his 89th birthday.
