= Woody Stephens =

American horse trainer (1913–1998)

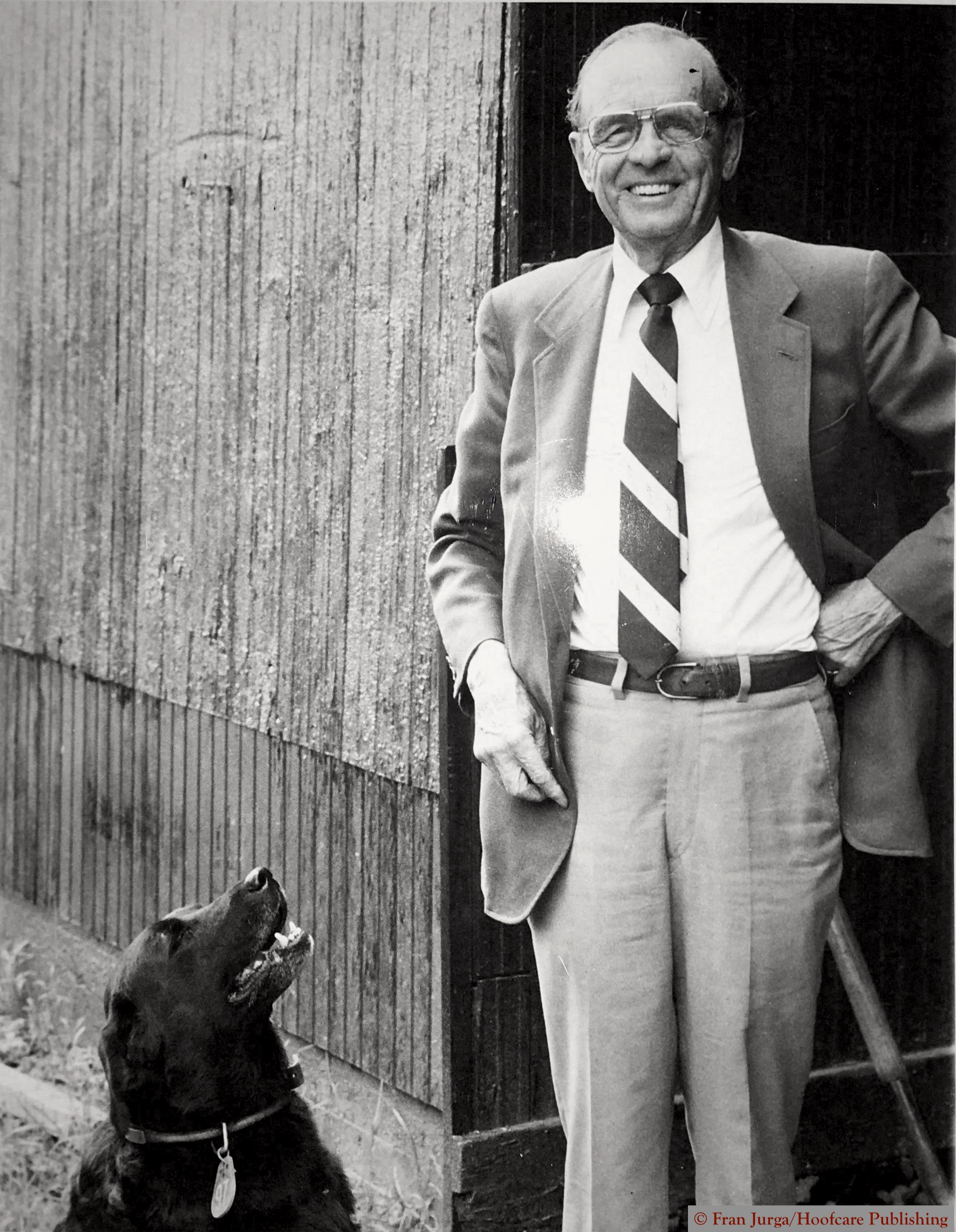
- Woodford Cephis "Woody" Stephens at Saratoga racetrack, circa August 1995 (approx).

Personal information
- Born: September 1, 1913 Stanton, Kentucky, U.S.
- Died: August 22, 1998 (aged 84)
- Occupation: Trainer

Horse racing career
- Sport: Horse racing
- Career wins: 1,937

Major racing wins
- Ashland Stakes (1949, 1957, 1959, 1963); Blue Grass Stakes (1949, 1954, 1974); Sanford Stakes (1954, 1971, 1987); Breeders' Futurity Stakes (1954, 1975, 1983, 1987); Withers Stakes (1955, 1987); Ohio Derby (1955, 1979); Woodward Stakes (1955); Kentucky Oaks (1959, 1960, 1963, 1978, 1981); Saratoga Handicap (1959); Washington, D.C. International Stakes (1959, 1960); Arlington Handicap (1960); Aqueduct Handicap (1960, 1973); Metropolitan Handicap (1960, 1982); Saratoga Special Stakes (1961, 1981, 1983); Belmont Futurity Stakes (1962, 1983, 1986); Champagne Stakes (1962, 1983, 1987); Suburban Handicap (1964); Washington Park Handicap (1966); Jim Dandy Stakes (1982, 1985); Adirondack Stakes (1969, 1979, 1984); Spinaway Stakes (1969, 1976, 1979); Gazelle Stakes (1970, 1984); Hopeful Stakes (1970); Arlington Matron Handicap (1972); Florida Derby (1974, 1984); Remsen Stakes (1975, 1977, 1989); Young America Stakes (1983); Saranac Stakes (1975, 1981, 1983, 1986, 1988); Alabama Stakes (1978); Wood Memorial Stakes (1978); Test Stakes (1978); American Derby (1979, 1985); Pennsylvania Derby (1979, 1984, 1988); Tropical Park Derby (1984, 1988); Acorn Stakes (1981, 1984, 1986); Diana Handicap (1981); E. P. Taylor Stakes (1981); Hollywood Derby (1981); Arlington-Washington Lassie Stakes (1983, 1984); Cotillion Handicap (1983); Hempstead Handicap (1983, 1986); Secretariat Stakes (1984); Yellow Ribbon Stakes (1984); Gardenia Stakes (1985, 1988, 1989); Queen Elizabeth II Challenge Cup (1985, 1986); Jockey Club Gold Cup (1986, 1987); Peter Pan Stakes (1986); Haskell Invitational Handicap (1988); Travers Stakes (1988) American Classic Race wins: Kentucky Derby (1974, 1984); Preakness Stakes (1952); Belmont Stakes (1982, 1983, 1984, 1985, 1986)

Racing awards
- Big Sport of Turfdom Award (1982); Eclipse Award for Outstanding Trainer (1983)

Honours
- Long Island Sports Hall of Fame; United States' Racing Hall of Fame (1976); Woody Stephens Stakes at Belmont Park

Significant horses
- Blue Man, Traffic Judge, Bald Eagle, Never Bend, Bold Bidder, Danzig, Sensational, De La Rose, Devil's Bag, Conquistador Cielo, Caveat, Swale, Creme Fraiche, Danzig Connection, Forty Niner

Woody Stephens (September 1, 1913 – August 22, 1998) was an American Thoroughbred horse racing Hall of Fame trainer.

== Biography ==
Born Woodford Cefis Stephens in Stanton, Kentucky, he had a younger brother named William Ward Stephens who also became a successful trainer. Woody Stephens started in racing as a jockey at age 16 but within a few years switched to training horses. After working as an assistant for several years, in the late 1930s he started training on his own, taking on horses from various owners. Near the end of the 1950s, he was hired by the wealthy Harry Guggenheim as head trainer for his Cain Hoy Stable. The move proved very successful, with Stephens training several champions and winning a number of major stakes races, including the Kentucky Oaks three times. He remained with the Guggenheim operation for ten years before returning to run his own stable again in 1966.

In a career that spanned seven decades, Stephens trained eleven Eclipse Award winners, and his horses won over a hundred Grade 1 stakes races. Among his most notable horses was Henryk de Kwiatkowski's colt Conquistador Cielo, the winner of the 1982 Eclipse Award for Horse of the Year. Although Stephens trained horses that won the Kentucky Oaks for fillies five times, plus the Kentucky Derby twice and the Preakness Stakes once, he is most remembered for winning an unprecedented five straight Belmont Stakes from 1982 to 1986.

Stephens was elected to the National Museum of Racing and Hall of Fame in 1976. In 1983, he won the Eclipse Award as the top trainer in the United States. Although he often wore rumpled clothes, his earnings from racing plus investments in successful breeding stock made him a very wealthy man. In 1985 Doubleday published Guess I'm Lucky, an autobiography he wrote with James Brough.

== Personal life, death ==
Stephens was a resident of Midway, Kentucky, where he started his work with Thoroughbred horses. He died in 1998 in Miami Lakes, Florida, from complications of chronic emphysema 10 days shy of his 85th birthday.

== Awards ==
U.S. Triple Crown race winners

- Kentucky Derby:
  - 1974 : Cannonade
  - 1984 : Swale
- Preakness Stakes:
  - 1952 : Blue Man
- Belmont Stakes:
  - 1982 : Conquistador Cielo
  - 1983 : Caveat
  - 1984 : Swale
  - 1985 : Creme Fraiche
  - 1986 : Danzig Connection
