= 1938 Kentucky Derby =

Horse race

64th Kentucky Derby
- Kentucky Derby
- Grade I stakes race
- Location: Churchill Downs
- Date: May 7, 1938
- Winning horse: Lawrin
- Jockey: Eddie Arcaro
- Trainer: Ben A. Jones
- Owner: Woolford Farm
- Surface: Dirt

The 1938 Kentucky Derby was the 64th running of the Kentucky Derby. The race took place on May 7, 1938.

== Full results ==
| Finished | Post | Horse | Jockey | Trainer | Owner | Time / behind |
|---|---|---|---|---|---|---|
| 1st | 1 | Lawrin | Eddie Arcaro | Ben A. Jones | Woolford Farm | 2:04 4/5 |
| 2nd | 3 | Dauber | Maurice Peters | Richard E. Handlen | Foxcatcher Farms | |
| 3rd | 7 | Can't Wait | Lester Balaski | J. Thomas Taylor | Myron Selznick | |
| 4th | 10 | Menow | Raymond Workman | Duval A. Headley | Hal Price Headley | |
| 5th | 9 | The Chief | Jack Westrope | Earl Sande | Maxwell Howard | |
| 6th | 5 | Fighting Fox | James Stout | James E. Fitzsimmons | Belair Stud | |
| 7th | 2 | Co-sport | George Woolf | R. T. Runnels | Benjamin "Bert" Friend | |
| 8th | 6 | Bull Lea | Irving Anderson | Frank J. Kearns | Calumet Farm | |
| 9th | 4 | Elooto | Fred Faust | Owen Bagley | Blue Ridge Farm | |
| 10th | 8 | Mountain Ridge | Alfred M. Robertson | Robert V. McGarvey | Milky Way Farm Stable | |

- Winning breeder: Herbert M. Woolf (KS)
