= Albert Snider =

American horse racing jockey

Personal information
- Born: October 22, 1921 Calgary, Alberta, Canada
- Died: March 5, 1948 (aged 26) Florida, U.S.
- Resting place: Lost at sea
- Occupation: Jockey

Horse racing career
- Sport: Horse racing

Major racing wins
- Arlington-Washington Lassie Stakes (1940); Lincoln Handicap (1940); Princess Pat Stakes (1941); Stars and Stripes Handicap (1941); Hawthorne Handicap (1942); Rhode Island Handicap (1942); Continental Handicap (1944); East View Stakes (1944); Gallant Fox Handicap (1944); Remsen Stakes (1944); Diana Handicap (1945); Top Flight Handicap (1945); Eastern Shore Stakes (1946, 1947); Everglades Stakes (1946, 1948); Miss America Handicap (1946); Potomac Handicap (1946, 1947); Scarsdale Handicap (1946); Baltimore Spring Handicap (1947); Belmont Futurity Trial (1947); Belmont Futurity (1947); Flamingo Stakes (1947, 1948); Grassland Handicap (1947); Jennings Handicap (1947); Philadelphia Handicap (1947); Pimlico Special (1947); Quck Step Stakes (1947); Sysonby Handicap (1947); Flamingo Stakes (1948); Seminole Handicap (1948); Suwannee River Handicap (1948)

Racing awards
- Gulfstream Park Leading Jockey (1939)

Significant horses
- Armed, Faultless, Fervent, Hoop Jr., Citation, Pellicle, Saggy, War Jeep
- Updated on November 12, 2022

Albert Snider (October 22, 1921 – March 5, 1948) was a jockey in Thoroughbred racing who had success in his native Canada as well as the United States.

== Biography ==
Snider was born in Calgary, Alberta, in 1921. He got his first win as a Thoroughbred jockey on September 1, 1938, at Stamford Park racetrack in Niagara Falls, Ontario. He was riding in the southern United States in the latter part of 1938 where he quickly established a reputation as a capable rider. In the ensuing years, he rode at major tracks in New York, Massachusetts, Rhode Island, Maryland, Kentucky and Illinois. Among his significant wins were the Arlington-Washington Lassie Stakes and the Stars and Stripes Handicap. In his best finish in an American Classic, Snider rode owner Fred W. Hooper's colt Hoop Jr. to second place in the 1945 Preakness Stakes. He won the 1946 inaugural running of the Miss America Handicap with Hal Price Headley's Letmenow.

Signed on to ride for Calumet Farm, Snider became the jockey for future United States' Racing Hall of Fame inductee, Citation. He rode Citation in his career debut on April 22, 1947, winning a 4 1/2 furlong race at Havre de Grace Racetrack and most notably going on to win the Belmont Futurity Stakes en route to Citation being voted the U.S. Champion 2-Year-Old Colt. In all, Snider rode Citation five times at age two and four times at age three. He won all nine races.

Another of Snider's impressive wins in 1947 was aboard Fervent in the mile and three-sixteenths Pimlico Special. Run October 30 at Narragansett Park, stiff competition in the $25,000 winner-take-all race saw the field narrowed to four runners. In addition to Fervent, Calumet Farm also entered their best runner, Armed. Ridden by Douglas Dodson, bettors made Armed the 1-5 favorite in a year the future Hall of Fame gelding would be voted American Horse of the Year honors. The William G. Helis Sr. colt Cosmic Bomb had Ovie Scurlock aboard, Loyal Legion, owned by Walter M. Jeffords, was ridden by Eddie Arcaro.

In the space of two days in May 1947, Snider guided three different horses to wins at Havre de Grace Racetrack in track record time. On two days during July at two racetracks in Chicago he rode two more horses to a track record time, one on turf and the other on dirt.

Date	Horse	Owner	Event	Track	Surface	Dist.	Time	Ref.
May 12, 1947	Airy	Calumet Farm	2yo Maiden Fillies	Havre de Grace	Dirt	5 furlongs	0:58 3/5	
May 12, 1947	Pep Well	Calumet Farm	Philadelphia Handicap	Havre de Grace	Dirt	6 furlong	1:10 1/5	
May 13, 1947	Gorget	Art-Dale Stable (Mrs. George Smith)	Monkton Purse	Havre de Grace	Dirt	1 mile, 70 yards	1:41 3/5	
July 9, 1947	Pellicle	Hal Price Headley	Grassland Handicap	Arlington Park	Turf	1 3/16 miles	1:56 0/5	
July 28, 1947	With Pleasure	Brolite Farm (Oscar E. Breault)	Quick Step Stakes	Washington Park	Dirt	6 furlongs	1:09 4/5	

1948 promised to be a great year as Snider prepared to ride Citation in the U.S. Triple Crown series. At Hialeah Park Race Track, he rode the colt to victory in the 1948 Seminole and Everglades Handicaps. Several days after winning the Flamingo Stakes, Snider used a day off, March 5, to go fishing in the Florida Keys. While out on the water, a sudden storm came up and Snider apparently drowned. His skiff was found eight days later on a small island 10 miles (16 km) south of Everglades City, but search parties found no trace of Snider or the two other men who had been with him.

Calumet Farms head trainer Ben Jones hired Eddie Arcaro to replace Snider on Citation and they won the Kentucky Derby, Preakness Stakes, and Belmont Stakes, making him only the eighth horse in history to win the U.S. Triple Crown. Calumet Farm and winning jockey Arcaro, one of Snider's friends, gave Snider's widow a share of his Kentucky Derby purse money.

In an extensive 1999 interview, Calumet Farm's Hall of Fame trainer Jimmy Jones spoke to Blood-Horse Publications about Snider with "fondness and respect" saying such things as "Albert was a great rider, just as good as Eddie Arcaro", "Albert rode Citation better than anybody", "he was a very intelligent rider, very polished", "he conducted himself like a professional", "with great work habits", "It was just a shame Albert couldn't have gone on with Citation to win the Triple Crown and Horse of the Year and all those races," and "Losing a fine young man like that when he was in his prime, well, it just made us all sick".
