= Ridan (horse) =

American-bred Thoroughbred racehorse

- Sire: Nantallah
- Grandsire: Nasrullah
- Dam: Rough Shod
- Damsire: Gold Bridge
- Sex: Stallion
- Foaled: 1959
- Country: United States
- Color: Bay
- Breeder: Tom M. Girdler
- Owner: Dorothy Jolley, Ernest Woods, John L. Greer
- Trainer: LeRoy Jolley
- Record: 23: 13-6-2
- Earnings: $635,074

Major wins
- Arlington Futurity (1961); Hyde Park Stakes (1961); Washington Park Futurity (1961); Hibiscus Stakes (1962); Florida Derby (1962); Blue Grass Stakes (1962); Arlington Classic (1962); Palm Beach Handicap (1963)

Honors
- Ridan Way in Aiken, South Carolina

Ridan (February 21, 1959 – 1977) was an American Thoroughbred racehorse who in 1961 was one of the best two-year-old colts racing in the United States but lost the 1962 U.S. Champion Three-Year-Old honors by a fraction of a nose.

== Background ==
Ridan was bred by Tom M. Girdler and foaled on February 21, 1959, at Claiborne Farm. A full brother to 1965 U.S. Horse of the Year Moccasin, Ridan was sired by Nantallah out of the Gold Bridge mare, Rough Shod II.

He was sold to trainer Moody Jolley as a yearling for $11,000 before giving ownership to Jolley's wife, Dorothy. Later, Ernest Woods and John L. Greer would each buy a one-third interest in the horse.

Due to the colt's resemblance to Nadir, one of the American Champion Two-Year-Old colts of 1957 who had been trained by Jolley, the horse was given the name Ridan, which is Nadir spelt backwards.

== Racing career ==
=== 1961: Two-year-old season ===
Trained by Jolley's son LeRoy, and ridden by future U.S. Hall of Fame jockey Bill Hartack, the two-year-old Ridan went unbeaten in seven starts in 1961 that included the important Arlington Futurity and Washington Park Futurity. Soreness in a foreleg cut short his season, and although he had handily beaten another two-year-old star, Crimson Satan, the 1961 U.S. Juvenile Champion honors went to Crimson Satan. The choice was hotly debated in racing circles. Hartack said Ridan was the best two-year-old he had ever ridden or seen. A number of expert racing observers agreed, saying that Ridan was the best two-year-old they had ever seen.

=== 1962: Three-year-old season ===
In 1962, Ridan won the Hibiscus Stakes before losing his undefeated title in the Bahamas Stakes to Sir Gaylord, whom Ridan had beaten in his maiden race the previous year. The next time the two colts would go against each other would be at the Everglades Stakes later that month. Ridan would initially place third behind Sir Gaylord and Decidedly, but was soon after disqualified to fourth because of interference in the stretch. LeRoy Jolley would drop Hartack as Ridan's jockey after this race.

After gaining second place following the disqualification of Sunrise County in the Flamingo Stakes, Ridan won his next two starts, defeating Sir Gaylord's stablemate, Cicada, in the Florida Derby before capturing the Blue Grass Stakes over Decidedly.

In the Kentucky Derby, Ridan wound up third after running wide in a hard-fought race in which he and Roman Line finished a neck behind upset winner Decidedly. Disappointment followed in the Preakness Stakes, the second leg of the U.S. Triple Crown. Ridan lost by the then-narrowest margin in Preakness history, beaten by a nose by Brandywine Stable longshot Greek Money.

Ridan would make two more starts after returning to Arlington Park. The first was a win by seven lengths in the Arlington Classic while the next would be an upset from Black Sheep in the American Derby.

On August 18, Ridan and that year's Belmont Stakes winner, the George D. Widener Jr. colt Jaipur, went head-to-head the entire 1 1/4-mile distance of the Travers Stakes at Saratoga, a race that would determine the 1962 U.S. Champion Three-Year-Old Horse. Both horses would break Man o' War's previous race record by 1/5 of a second and the winning margin being a narrow nose. It was so narrow that footage from the photo-finish camera had to be checked before Jaipur was declared the winner.

Ridan would have two more starts that year, third in the Aqueduct Stakes and, after cutting his left hind heel, fifth in the Discovery Handicap. Plans to put him in the Woodward Stakes were cancelled and the colt was retired for the rest of the year.

=== 1963: Four-year-old season ===
Ridan raced only three times at the age of four. After winning an allowance race at Hialeah Park by five lengths, he would then go on to win over Jaipur and Kelso in the Palm Beach Handicap. He would then place second in the Seminole Handicap, suffering an ankle injury during the race and being retired for good.

== Stud career ==
Once he had recovered, Ridan was sent to Claiborne Farm for stud. He would stay there until 1970 when he was moved to Robin's Nest Farm in Ocala, Florida. He eventually would be brought to Ireland in 1972 before finally being sent to a breeding operation in Australia, where he died in 1977 from an intestinal torsion.

== Racing statistics ==
Date	Track	Race	Distance	Finish	Time	Winning (Losing) Margin	Jockey	Winner (2nd Place)	Ref
Feb 10, 1961	Hialeah	Maiden	3 furlongs	1	0:33	2 1/4 lengths	Bill Hartack	(Obey)	
Apr 20, 1961	Keeneland	Allowance	4 furlongs 152 ft	1	0:48 1/5	2 lengths	Johnny Sellers	(I'm For More)	
Jun 14, 1961	Washington Park	Allowance	5 1/2 furlongs	1	1:03 2/5		Johnny Sellers	(Obey)	
Jun 21, 1961	Arlington Park	Hyde Park Stakes	5 1/2 furlongs	1	1:04 2/5	6 lengths	Johnny Sellers	(Green Hornet)	
Jul 29, 1961	Arlington Park	Arlington Futurity	6 furlongs	1	1:09	5 1/2 lengths	Bill Hartack	(Green Ticket)	
Aug 21, 1961	Arlington Park	Prairie State Stakes	6 furlongs	1	1:10 1/5	2 3/4 lengths	Bill Hartack	(Eight Ball)	
Sep 2, 1961	Washington Park	Washington Park Futurity	6 1/2 furlongs	1	1:18	1 length	Bill Hartack	(Obey)	
Jan 20, 1962	Hialeah	Hibiscus Stakes	6 furlongs	1	1:09 1/5	1 1/2 lengths	Bill Hartack	(Rainy Lake)	
Feb 7, 1962	Hialeah	Bahamas Stakes	7 furlongs	2	1:22	(1 3/4 lengths)	Bill Hartack	Sir Gaylord	
Feb 21, 1962	Hialeah	Everglades Stakes	1 1/8 miles	4^{[a]}	1:48 2/5	(4 3/4 lengths)	Bill Hartack	Sir Gaylord	
Mar 3, 1962	Hialeah	Flamingo Stakes	1 1/8 miles	2^{[b]}	1:49	(1 1/4 lengths)	Ismael Valenzuela	Prego	
Mar 31, 1962	Gulfstream Park	Florida Derby	1 1/8 miles	1	1:50 2/5	Nose	Manuel Ycaza	(Cicada)	
Apr 26, 1962	Keeneland	Blue Grass Stakes	1 1/8 miles	1	1:47 3/5	4 lengths	Manuel Ycaza	(Decidedly)	
May 5, 1962	Churchill Downs	Kentucky Derby	1 1/4 miles	3	2:00 2/5	(2 1/4 lengths)	Manuel Ycaza	Decidedly	
May 19, 1962	Pimlico	Preakness Stakes	1 3/16 miles	2	1:56 1/5	(Nose)	Manuel Ycaza	Greek Money	
Jul 14, 1962	Arlington Park	Arlington Classic	1 mile	1	1:38	7 lengths	Avelino Gomez	(Mighty Fennec)	
Aug 4, 1962	Arlington Park	American Derby	1 1/4 miles	2	2:01 3/5	(1 1/4 lengths)	Avelino Gomez	Black Sheep	
Aug 18, 1962	Saratoga	Travers Stakes	1 1/4 miles	2	2:01 3/5	(Nose)	Manuel Ycaza	Jaipur	
Sep 3, 1962	Aqueduct	Aqueduct Stakes	1 1/16 miles	3	1:48 4/5	(1/2 length)	Manuel Ycaza	Crozier	
Sep 24, 1962	Aqueduct	Discovery Handicap	1 1/8 miles	5	1:48 3/5	(1/2 length)	Bill Shoemaker	Comic	
Jan 19, 1963	Hialeah	Allowance	7 furlongs	1	1:22 3/5	5 lengths	Steve Brooks	(Porvenir II)	
Jan 31, 1963	Hialeah	Palm Beach Handicap	7 furlongs	1	1:22 4/5	3 1/2 lengths	Steve Brooks	(Jaipur)	
Feb 9, 1963	Hialeah	Seminole Handicap	1 1/8 miles	2	1:48 4/5	(2 3/4 lengths)	Steve Brooks	Kelso	

^{a} Finished third. Disqualified to fourth.
^{b} Promoted from third place to second after disqualification of Sunrise County.

== Pedigree ==
Pedigree of Ridan, bay colt, 1959
Sire Nantallah	Nasrullah	Nearco	Pharos
Sire Nantallah	Nasrullah	Nearco	Nogara
Sire Nantallah	Nasrullah	Mumtaz Begum	Blenheim
Sire Nantallah	Nasrullah	Mumtaz Begum	Mumtaz Mahal
Sire Nantallah	Shimmer	Flares	Gallant Fox
Sire Nantallah	Shimmer	Flares	Flambino
Sire Nantallah	Shimmer	Broad Ripple	Stimulus
Sire Nantallah	Shimmer	Broad Ripple	Hocus Pocus
Dam Rough Shod	Gold Bridge	Golden Boss	The Boss
Dam Rough Shod	Gold Bridge	Golden Boss	Golden Hen
Dam Rough Shod	Gold Bridge	Flying Diadem	Diadumenos
Dam Rough Shod	Gold Bridge	Flying Diadem	Flying Bridge
Dam Rough Shod	Dalmary	Blandford	Swynford
Dam Rough Shod	Dalmary	Blandford	Blanche
Dam Rough Shod	Dalmary	Simons Shoes	Simon Square
Dam Rough Shod	Dalmary	Simons Shoes	Goody Two-Shoes (family: 5-h)
