= Douglas Dodson =

American horse trainer and jockey

Personal information
- Born: December 21, 1921 Pickardville, Alberta, Canada
- Died: February 4, 1982 (aged 60) Miami, Florida, United States
- Resting place: Vista Memorial Gardens, Miami Lakes, Florida
- Occupation: Jockey / Trainer

Horse racing career
- Sport: Horse racing
- Career wins: Not found

Major racing wins
- Longacres Mile (1939); Santa Margarita Handicap (1940); Laurel Futurity (1944, 1947, 1954); Mardi Gras Handicap (1944); Pimlico Special (1944, 1945); Arlington Classic (1945); Ben Ali Stakes (1945, 1947, 1951, 1958); Cowdin Stakes (1945); Jockey Club Gold Cup (1945); Lawrence Realization Stakes (1945); Derby Trial Stakes (1945, 1947, 1951); Clark Handicap (1946, 1951); Philadelphia Handicap (1946); Suburban Handicap (1946); Walden Stakes (1946); Washington Park Handicap (1946, 1947); Whirlaway Handicap (1946, 1947); Widener Handicap (1946, 1947, 1951); American Derby (1947); Arlington Handicap (1947, 1957); Arlington-Washington Lassie Stakes (1947); Blue Grass Stakes (1947, 1950); Flamingo Stakes (1947); Gulfstream Park Handicap (1947); Lincoln Handicap (1947); Marguerite Stakes (1947); Stars and Stripes Turf Handicap (1947); Widener Handicap (1947); Withers Stakes (1947, 1948); Beldame Stakes (1948); Jamaica Handicap (1948); Royal Palm Handicap (1948, 1949); Wood Memorial Stakes (1948); Acorn Stakes (1949); Canadian Championship Stakes (1949); Fleetwing Handicap (1949); Gazelle Handicap (1949); Prioress Stakes (1949); Bahamas Stakes (1950, 1952); Discovery Handicap (1950); Excelsior Handicap (1950); Fall Highweight Handicap (1950); Phoenix Handicap (1950, 1953); Sysonby Handicap (1950); Lafayette Stakes (1951, 1952); Arlington-Washington Futurity Stakes (1952); Ashland Stakes (1953); Modesty Handicap (1954); Remsen Stakes (1954); Breeders' Futurity (1955); Louisiana Derby (1955); Youthful Stakes (1955) American Classic Race wins: Preakness Stakes (1947) As a trainer: Miss Florida Handicap (1963); Appleton Handicap (1965); Fair Grounds Oaks (1975); Violet Handicap (1978); Youthful Stakes (1979)

Racing awards
- Leading jockey at Arlington Park (1945, 1946); United States Champion Jockey by earnings (1947)

Significant horses
- Arise, Armed, Bewitch, Citation, Faultless, Hill Prince, Pot O'Luck, Twilight Tear, Vulcan's Forge

Douglas Allan Dodson (December 21, 1921 - February, 1982) was a National Champion jockey in American Thoroughbred horse racing.

== Early life ==
Douglas Dodson was born in Pickardville, Alberta, Canada, the son of James Floyd and Emma Dodson. His family moved to a ranch in Elk River, Idaho when he was still a child and as a small boy he learned to ride horses and rope steers. His parents moved to Burns, Oregon where at age fifteen, he was working as a shoeshine boy when trainer Harry Walters told the diminutive boy shining his shoes about racing Thoroughbreds. Deciding that he wanted to try his luck as a jockey, Dodson soon traveled to the Longacres Racetrack in Renton, Washington. There, he was hired by trainer Walter Neilsen and, while still an apprentice jockey in 1939, won the Pacific Northwest's most prestigious race, the Longacres Mile. At age seventeen, he was the youngest jockey to ever win the Longacres Mile.

== Riding career ==
In 1940, the then nineteen-year-old Dodson was signed by Warren Wright, Sr. to join Eddie Arcaro as a rider for his Calumet Farm stable of Lexington, Kentucky. In September of the previous year, Wright had hired Ben Jones as head trainer. The result saw Calumet Farm record the most successful decade of any racing stable in the history of American Thoroughbred racing. Between 1945 and 1961, Douglas Dodson made twelve appearances in the Kentucky Derby without winning. His best result came with his first ride in 1945 aboard Pot O'Luck when he ran second. Later that year, he rode Pot O' Luck to victory in the Jockey Club Gold Cup. Dodson finished third in the Derby on three other occasions. He had much better luck in the second leg of the U.S. Triple Crown, the Preakness Stakes. After finishing second by a neck in 1946 aboard Maine Chance Farm's Lord Boswell, he won the race in 1947 aboard Faultless defeating, among others Phalanx, later to be voted outstanding three-year-old male horse that year. The following year he earned another second-place result with Vulcan's Forge. Dodson made his fourth and last Preakness start in 1956, earning third place aboard No Regrets. His association with Calumet came to a bitter end in 1948 when Dodson quit the racing stable after being denied a mount on Citation, soon to win the Triple Crown, in favor of the colt's regular rider, fellow Canadian Albert Snider.

== Achievements ==
Among Douglas Dodson's other accomplishments in racing, he was the Leading jockey at Arlington Park in 1945 and 1946. In 1949, he made a return visit to his native Canada to ride the future Canadian Horse Racing Hall of Fame colt Arise to a win in the Canadian Championship Stakes. In 1951, Dodson became the first jockey to win three editions of the then richest race in Florida, the Widener Handicap at Hialeah Park. Dodson had his greatest success in 1946 and 1947 with the Calumet colt, Armed. Voted the U.S. Champion Older Male Horse both years, on September 27, 1947, Armed and Dodson defeated U.S. Triple Crown champion Assault in a $100,000 winner take all match race at Belmont Park. That year, Armed received the highest honor in horse racing when he was voted Horse of the Year, and in 1963, would be inducted in the National Museum of Racing and Hall of Fame. For Dodson, he won a National riding title in 1947 when he led all American jockeys in total purses won.

== Retirement ==
Dodson retired from riding at the beginning of the 1960s but remained in the horse racing industry as a trainer. In 1965, he was the top trainer at Hialeah Park Race Track in Hialeah, Florida.

Douglas Dodson was living in Hollywood, Florida at the time of his death in 1982.
