= Parnell, Missouri =

- City
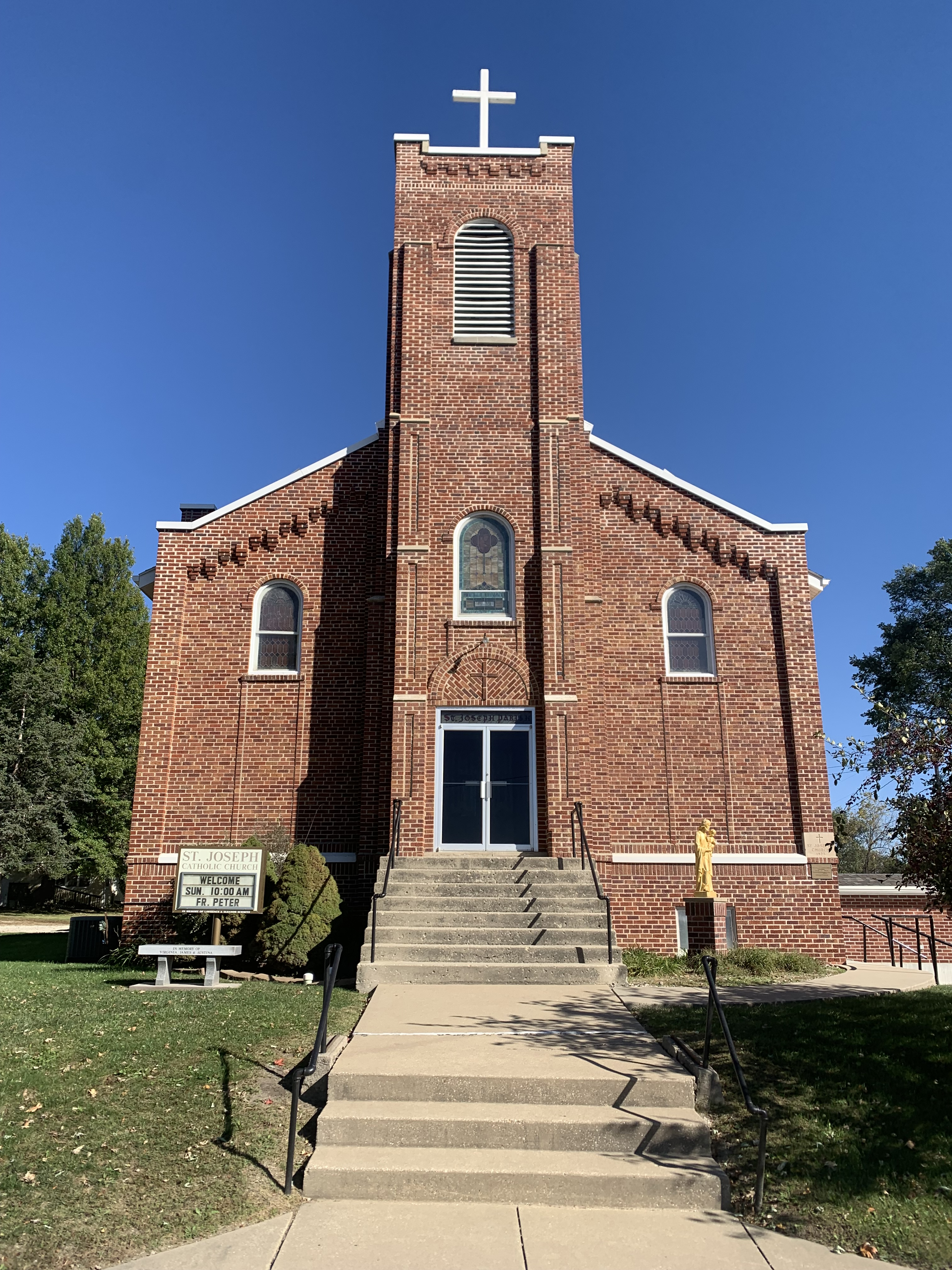
- St. Joseph Catholic Church in Parnell

- Location of Parnell, Missouri
- Coordinates: 40°26′18″N 94°37′20″W
- Country: United States
- State: Missouri
- County: Nodaway
- Township: Independence
- Platted: 1887

Area
  - Total: 0.27 sq mi (0.71 km^{2})
  - Land: 0.27 sq mi (0.71 km^{2})
  - Water: 0 sq mi (0.00 km^{2})
- Elevation: 1,040 ft (320 m)

Population (2020)
  - Total: 135
  - Density: 493/sq mi (190.5/km^{2})
- Time zone: UTC-6 (Central (CST))
  - Summer (DST): UTC-5 (CDT)
- ZIP code: 64475
- Area code: 660
- FIPS code: 29-56360
- GNIS feature ID: 2396157

Parnell is a city in northeast Nodaway County, Missouri, United States, near the Platte River. The population was 135 at the 2020 Census. It was home to the father-son horse trainers Ben and Jimmy Jones, whose horses won eight Kentucky Derbies and two Triple Crowns.

== History ==
Parnell was platted on July 5, 1887 as a station stop on the Chicago Great Western Railway and it was formally incorporated in 1888. The Chicago Great Western route passing through the community was called the Diagonal Route. It ran at northeast direction from Kansas City to Waterloo, Iowa including passing through the community of Diagonal, Iowa. Among the first businesses was the Diagonal Hotel.

Ben Jones father Horace Jones organized the founding of the community and an early proposed names was Jonesville until it was discovered there was another Jonesville in Missouri. The name ultimately chosen was in honor or Irish politician Charles Stewart Parnell who was at the peak of influence in creating Irish homerule when Parnell was incorporated.

The elder Horace Jones started a ranch on the northeast side of Parnell where he raised Angus cattle and saddle horses. At the ranch Ben (along with his son Horace "Jimmy") trained a horse named Seth which was in the top 20 of the national thoroughbred sires list from 1925 to 1928. This in turn got the attention of Herbert M. Woolf, owner of Woolford Farm in Prairie Village, Kansas and Ben trained Lawrin which won the Kentucky Derby in 1938. The two were lured by Warren Wright, Sr. to train horses at Calumet Farm in 1939 where they racked up a record training 7 Kentucky Derby winners (1941, 1944, 1948, 1949, 1952, 1957, 1958) and two Triple Crown winners (Whirlaway and Citation). Ben's record of 6 wins remains a Derby record. He was succeeded by Jimmy as trainer and Jimmy was the trainer of record for the 1957 and 1958 wins although Ben stayed on as Calumet manager until 1961. Jimmy stayed at Calumet until 1964 when he became manager of racing at Monmouth Park.

After he retiring in 1976 Jimmy returned to 1,750 acre ranch in Parnell. He sold the ranch in 1986. He had no children and died in Maryville, Missouri in 2001. He left $7.2 million to St. Francis Hospital there.

== Geography ==
Parnell is located at the junction of routes 46 and NN one-half mile from the Nodaway-Worth county line. The Platte River flows past the west side of the community. Ravenwood is approximately six miles to the south-southwest and Sheridan in northwest Worth County is five miles to the north.

According to the United States Census Bureau, the city has a total area of 0.29 square miles (0.75 km^{2}), all land.

== Demographics ==
Historical population
Census	Pop.	Note	%±
1890	267		—
1900	432		61.8%
1910	438		1.4%
1920	473		8.0%
1930	490		3.6%
1940	450		−8.2%
1950	362		−19.6%
1960	260		−28.2%
1970	232		−10.8%
1980	223		−3.9%
1990	157		−29.6%
2000	197		25.5%
2010	191		−3.0%
2020	135		−29.3%
U.S. Decennial Census

=== 2010 census ===
As of the census of 2010, there were 191 people, 90 households, and 49 families residing in the city. The population density was 658.6 inhabitants per square mile (254.3/km^{2}). There were 127 housing units at an average density of 437.9 per square mile (169.1/km^{2}). The racial makeup of the city was 99.5% White and 0.5% Asian.

There were 90 households, of which 35.6% had children under the age of 18 living with them, 32.2% were married couples living together, 17.8% had a female householder with no husband present, 4.4% had a male householder with no wife present, and 45.6% were non-families. 43.3% of all households were made up of individuals, and 18.9% had someone living alone who was 65 years of age or older. The average household size was 2.12 and the average family size was 2.92.

The median age in the city was 32.8 years. 28.8% of residents were under the age of 18; 9.4% were between the ages of 18 and 24; 22% were from 25 to 44; 24.1% were from 45 to 64; and 15.7% were 65 years of age or older. The gender makeup of the city was 53.4% male and 46.6% female.

=== 2000 census ===
As of the census of 2000, there were 197 people, 93 households, and 47 families residing in the city. The population density was 674.4 inhabitants per square mile (260.4/km^{2}). There were 105 housing units at an average density of 359.5 per square mile (138.8/km^{2}). The racial makeup of the city was 99.49% White and 0.51% African American.

There were 93 households, out of which 25.8% had children under the age of 18 living with them, 35.5% were married couples living together, 9.7% had a female householder with no husband present, and 48.4% were non-families. 43.0% of all households were made up of individuals, and 26.9% had someone living alone who was 65 years of age or older. The average household size was 2.12 and the average family size was 3.00.

In the city the population was spread out, with 21.3% under the age of 18, 14.2% from 18 to 24, 21.3% from 25 to 44, 19.3% from 45 to 64, and 23.9% who were 65 years of age or older. The median age was 41 years. For every 100 females there were 118.9 males. For every 100 females age 18 and over, there were 109.5 males.

The median income for a household in the city was $23,281, and the median income for a family was $33,750. Males had a median income of $21,250 versus $18,125 for females. The per capita income for the city was $13,467. About 2.2% of families and 13.6% of the population were below the poverty line, including 5.3% of those under the age of eighteen and 23.3% of those 65 or over.

== Notable people ==
- Ben Jones (1882–1961), horse trainer
- Horace A. Jones (1906–2001), horse trainer
