= Philadelphia Handicap =

- Class: Discontinued stakes
- Location: Havre de Grace Racetrack, Havre de Grace, Maryland; United States
- Inaugurated: 1913
- Race type: Thoroughbred - Flat racing

Race information
- Distance: 6 furlongs
- Surface: Dirt
- Track: left-handed
- Qualification: Three-year-olds and up

The Philadelphia Handicap was an American Thoroughbred horse race held thirty-eight times between 1913 and 1950 at Havre de Grace Racetrack in Havre de Grace, Maryland. Run on dirt, the race was open to horses of either sex age three and older.

From inception in 1913 through 1919, and again from 1947 through 1950, the event was contested at a sprint distance of six furlongs. In between, it was raced at a mile and a sixteenth.

== Historical notes ==
First run on April 26, 1913, Ten Point easily won the inaugural edition of the Philadelphia Handicap while equaling the track record despite giving weight to the rest of the field. Ten Point went on the run second in the May 10 Kentucky Derby.

In 1919 Commander J. K. L. Ross got the first of his three Philadelphia Handicap wins when Billy Kelly won for him. A gelding Billy Kelly's outstanding career would lead to induction into the U.S. Racing Hall of Fame. Five other horses would also have Hall of Fame careers beginning with Exterminator (1923) then Sun Beau (1931), two-time winner Equipoise (1933–1934), Challedon (1942) and Armed who broke the track record in winning the 1946 race.

Billy Kelly returned to compete in the 1920 Philadelphia Handicap along with stablemate Sir Barton who had won the 1919 U. S. Triple Cown. The race would see an astonishing upset when 106-1 longshot Crystal Ford came home ahead of the nine other runners. Star Master finished second in front of the third- and fourth-place finishers Billy Kelly and Sir Barton who were giving the winner 32 and 26 pounds, respectively.

Thanksgiving, a good runner owned by Anne Corning, had already won a number of races including the Travers Stakes when he won the 1939 Philadelphia Handicap. Thanksgiving's trainer was Mary Hirsch, someone who had overcome many obstacles to become the first woman in the United States licensed to train Thoroughbred racehorses. Mary Hirsch was the only female trainer to win the Philadelphia Handicap and through 2019 remains the only female trainer to have won the Travers Stakes.

World War II saw racing restricted in the United States and Havre de Grace Racetrack was forced to cancel all of its spring races in 1943 which included the Philadelphia Handicap.

In 1945 the Philadelphia Handicap was run at Pimlico Race Course due to Federal government wartime gasoline rationing that saw all four of Maryland's major racetracks consolidate their races into the Pimlico facility.

The following year the distance was changed to a six furlong sprint and was won by another Calumet horse, Pep Well, who was ridden by Albert Snider. Until his untimely death on March 5, 1948, Snider was the regular jockey for the great Citation and had won all nine races he was aboard. Snider was scheduled to ride in the May 1, 1948 Kentucky Derby but after his death Eddie Arcaro was hired to ride Citation and would win that year's Triple Crown.

On April 19, 1950, The Pincher won what would turn out to be the last running of the Philadelphia Handicap as horse racing came to an end at the Havre de Grace Racetrack at the close of that 1950 spring meeting.

== Records ==
Speed record:

- 1:10 2/5 @ 6 furlongs: Pep Well (1947)
- 1:43 1/5 @ 1 1/16 miles Armed (1946)

Most wins:

- 2 - Boniface (1921, 1922)
- 2 - Equipoise (1933, 1934)
- 2 - Pep Well (1947, 1949)

Most wins by a jockey:

- 3 - Maurice Peters (1936, 1939, 1940)

Most wins by a trainer:

- 3 - Henry McDaniel (1921, 1922, 1923)

Most wins by an owner:

- 3 - J. K. L. Ross (1919, 1921, 1922)
- 3 - Calumet Farm (1946, 1947, 1949)

== Winners ==
Year	Winner	Age	Jockey	Trainer	Owner	Dist. (M / F)	Time	Win$
1950	The Pincher	4	John Gilbert	George Mohr	Henry H. Hecht	6 F	1:10.40	$5,795
1949	Pep Well	6	Robert J. Martin	Horace A. Jones	Calumet Farm	6 F	1:11.60	$9,120
1948	Circus Clown	3	Ovie Scurlock	Thomas F. Root Sr.	William J. Walden	6 F	1:12.80	$8,820
1947	Pep Well	4	Albert Snider	Horace A. Jones	Calumet Farm	6 F	1:10.20	$8,960
1946	Armed	5	Douglas Dodson	Ben A. Jones	Calumet Farm	11/16 m	1:43.20	$18,350
1945	Gay Bit	4	Robert J. Martin	Albert Dunne	Bobanet Stable (R. Bruce Livie)	11/16 m	1:46.80	$3,200
1944	Rounders	5	Nick Jemas	William Booth	William G. Helis Sr.	11/16 m	1:45.40	$12,450
1943	Race not held due to wartime restrictions							
1942	Challedon	6	George Woolf	Edward A. Christmas	Branncastle Farm (William L. Brann & Robert S. Castle)	11/16 m	1:45.40	$7,925
1941	Ringie	4	John Gilbert	P. Dallee Watts	Gustave Ring	11/16 m	1:44.60	$7,925
1940	Masked General	6	Maurice Peters	William Mulholland	Brandywine Stable	11/16 m	1:44.20	$8,100
1939	Thanksgiving	4	Maurice Peters	Mary Hirsch	Anne Corning	11/16 m	1:49.20	$7,925
1938	Burning Star	4	Melvin Lewis	John J. Greely	Shandon Farm Stable (Richard L. & Patrick J. Nash)	11/16 m	1:45.80	$7,950
1937	Whopper	5	Harry Richards	Duval A. Headley	Hal Price Headley	11/16 m	1:45.60	$6,400
1936	Black Gift	4	Maurice Peters	Leon Carter	Leon Carter	11/16 m	1:45.80	$6,625
1935	Stand Pat	4	Robert Watson	Frank Gilpin	Edward F. Seagram	11/16 m	1:44.20	$6,550
1934	Equipoise	6	Raymond Workman	Thomas J. Healey	C. V. Whitney	11/16 m	1:44.40	$5,800
1933	Equipoise	5	Raymond Workman	Thomas J. Healey	C. V. Whitney	11/16 m	1:44.60	$6,375
1932	Lightning Bolt	4	Pete Walls	William Brennan	Liz Whitney	11/16 m	1:45.00	$8,850
1931	Sun Beau	6	Charles Kurtsinger	Andy Schuttinger	Willis Sharpe Kilmer	11/16 m	1:44.80	$9,000
1930	Inception	4	Fred Stevens	Oscar Chaney	Mrs. Oscar Chaney	11/16 m	1:52.20	$9,600
1929	Petee-Wrack	4	Steve O'Donnell	William Booth	John R. Macomber	11/16 m	1:45.40	$8,325
1928	Canter	5	Steve O'Donnell	Harry Rites	J. Edwin Griffith	11/16 m	1:46.40	$8,950
1927	Single Foot	5	Jack Chalmers	Harry Rites	J. Edwin Griffith	11/16 m	1:45.40	$8,650
1926	Edisto	4	Edgar Barnes	William H. Bringloe	Edward F. Seagram	11/16 m	1:46.80	$8,725
1925	Leopardess	4	Red Harvey	Clyde S. Phillips	Greentree Stable	11/16 m	1:47.40	$3,950
1924	Spot Cash	4	Fred Stevens	James W. Healy	Albert C. Bostwick Jr.	11/16 m	1:43.40	$3,350
1923	Exterminator	8	Linus McAtee	Henry McDaniel	Willis Sharpe Kilmer	11/16 m	1:45.80	$3,350
1922	Boniface	7	Clarence Turner	Henry McDaniel	J. K. L. Ross	11/16 m	1:45.00	$3,835
1921	Boniface	6	James Butwell	Henry McDaniel	J. K. L. Ross	11/16 m	1:48.20	$3,500
1920	Crystal Ford	4	Laverne Fator	Andrew G. Blakely	Nosreme Stable	11/16 m	1:45.40	$3,700
1919	Billy Kelly	3	Earl Sande	H. Guy Bedwell	J. K. L. Ross	6 F	1:12.40	$1,371
1918	Hauberk	6	Charles Peak	Jake Byer	J. F. Sweeney	6 F	1:12.40	$1,805
1917	Pennant	6	Frank Robinson	James G. Rowe Sr.	Harry Payne Whitney	6 F	1:13.20	$1,770
1916	A. N. Akin	4	Frank Robinson	Edward Trotter	Edward Trotter	6 F	1:13.00	$1,630
1915	Slumber	4	James Groth	James G. Rowe Sr.	Harry Payne Whitney	6 F	1:12.20	$1,645
1914	Sherwood	7	Wilmer Ward	L. Blume	J. W. Hedrick	6 F	1:12.80	$1,735
1913	Ten Point	3	James Butwell	Calvin Banks	Anthony L. Aste	6 F	1:11.60	$1,785
