= Everglades Stakes =

- Class: Defunct Grade III Stakes
- Location: Hialeah Park Race Track; Hialeah, Florida, United States
- Inaugurated: 1939
- Race type: Thoroughbred – Flat racing
- Website: www.hialeahparkracing.com

Race information
- Distance: 1 1/16 miles (8.5 furlongs)
- Surface: Turf
- Track: Left-handed
- Qualification: Three-years-old
- Purse: US$100,000

The Everglades Stakes was an American Thoroughbred horse race run annually at Hialeah Park in Hialeah, Florida. For three-year-old horses, the 1 1/8 mile race was run on dirt until 1994 when it was converted to a race on turf. It was elevated to Grade III status in 1999.

Raced for two-year-old fillies in 1939 and 1940, as a result of World War II, there was no race run between 1941 and 1945. On its return in 1946, it was changed to a race for three-year-olds as an important prep race for the Flamingo Stakes that would attract some of the very best horses in the United States.

In 2000, the race was held on the dirt at Gulfstream Park then was run for the last time ever back at Hialeah in 2001 after which the track closed.

The Everglades Stakes was run in two divisions in 1951.

== Records ==
Most wins by a jockey:

- 3 – Bill Hartack (1956, 1957, 1958)
- 3 – Michael Hole (1972, 1973, 1975)

Most wins by a trainer:

- 4 – Horace A. Jones (1948, 1956, 1957, 1958)

Most wins by an owner:

- 5 – Calumet Farm (1948, 1956, 1957, 1958, 1968)

== Winners ==
Year	Winner	Jockey	Trainer	Owner	Distance (Miles)	Time
2001	Proud Man	René Douglas	Harry Benson	Richard Kauffman & Richard Weiss	1-1/16	1:43.02
2000	Tubrok	Edgar Prado	Mohammed Moubarak	Buckram Oak Farm	1-1/16	1:45.90
1999	Swamp	Richard Migliore	John C. Kimmel	Heiligbrodt Racing Stable	1-1/16	1:42.25
1998	Cryptic Rascal	Julie Krone	William Badget Jr.	Landon Knight	1-1/16	1:43.21
1997	Trample	Pat Day	Todd A. Pletcher	Dogwood Stable	1-1/16	1:42.84
1996	Rough Opening	Eddie Maple	David G. Donk	Ryehill Farm	1-1/16	1:44.05
1995	Native Regent	Dave Penna	David R. Bell	John A. Franks	1-1/16	1:43.73
1994	Mr. Angel	Herb McCauley	Martin D. Wolfson	Mrs. Marian Prince	1-1/8	1:48.17
1993	Hegar	José C. Ferrer	Penny Lewis	James Jundt	1-1/8	1:52.04
1992	Pistols and Roses	Heberto Castillo Jr.	George Gianos	Sheldon Willis	1-1/8	1:51.31
1991	No races					
1990	No races					
1989	Awe Inspiring	Craig Perret	Claude McGaughey III	Ogden Mills Phipps	1-1/8	1:47.80
1988	Sorry About That	Jean Cruguet	Sonny Hine	Carolyn Hine	1-1/8	1:50.00
1987	Cryptoclearance	José A. Santos	Flint S. Schulhofer	Philip Teinowitz	1-1/8	1:48.80
1986	Badger Land	Jorge Velásquez	D. Wayne Lukas	Jeff Lukas & Mel Hatley	1-1/8	1:46.20
1985	Rhoman Rule	Jacinto Vásquez	Angel Penna Jr.	Brownwell Combs II	1-1/8	1:47.80
1984	Time For A Change	Jerry Bailey	Angel Penna Sr.	Ogden Mills Phipps	1-1/8	1:47.80
1983	Genl Practitioner	Juan Santiago	Leo Sierra	William E. Blair	1-1/8	1:48.80
1982	Royal Roberto	Miguel Rivera	James Iselin	Key West Stable	1-1/8	
1981	Highland Blade	Don Brumfield	David A. Whiteley	Pen-Y-Bryn Farm	1-1/8	1:48.60
1980	Rockhill Native	John Oldham	Herbert K. Stevens	Harry A. Oak	1-1/8	1:49.00
1979	Sir Ivor Again	Don MacBeth	LeRoy Jolley	Mrs. Tilyou Christopher	1-1/8	
1978	Quadratic	Eddie Maple	Woody Stephens	August Belmont IV	1-1/8	1:49.20
1977	No race					
1976	Proud Birdie	Jack Fieselman	Rosemary G. Lepera	Diamante Stable	1-1/8	1:49.60
1975	Ascetic	Michael Hole	Woody Stephens	Mill House	1-1/8	1:49.60
1974	Little Current	Ángel Cordero Jr.	Lou Rodinello	Darby Dan Farm	1-1/8	1:49.20
1973	Restless Jet	Michael Hole	Warren A. Croll Jr.	Elkwood Stable	1-1/8	1:48.60
1972	Head of the River	Michael Hole	J. Elliott Burch	Rokeby Stables	1-1/8	1:49.80
1971	His Majesty	Braulio Baeza	Lou Rondinello	Darby Dan Farm	1-1/8	1:50.40
1970	Naskra	John Rotz	Philip G. Johnson	Her-Jac Stable	1-1/8	1:48.80
1969	Arts and Letters	Jean Cruguet	J. Elliott Burch	Rokeby Stables	1-1/8	1:49.60
1968	Forward Pass	Don Brumfield	Henry Forrest	Calumet Farm	1-1/8	1:49.00
1967	Reflected Glory	Bobby Ussery	Hirsch Jacobs	Ethel D. Jacobs	1-1/8	1:49.80
1966	Buckpasser	Bill Shoemaker	Edward A. Neloy	Ogden Phipps	1-1/8	1:47.80
1965	Sparkling Johnny	Mike Venezia	Burley Parke	Harbor View Farm	1-1/8	1:51.00
1964	Roman Brother	Manuel Ycaza	Burley Parke	Harbor View Farm	1-1/8	1:51.80
1963	B Major	Jacinto Vásquez	Joseph H. Pierce Sr.	Elmendorf	1-1/8	1:47.60
1962	Sir Gaylord	Ismael Valenzuela	Casey Hayes	Christopher Chenery	1-1/8	1:48.40
1961	Carry Back	Johnny Sellers	Jack A. Price	Mrs. Katherine Price	1-1/8	1:50.60
1960	Moslem Chief	Johnny Sellers	Norman Haymaker	Mrs. James A. Bohannon	1-1/8	1:48.20
1959	First Landing	Eddie Arcaro	Casey Hayes	Christopher Chenery	1-1/8	1:47.80
1958	Tim Tam	Bill Hartack	Horace A. Jones	Calumet Farm	1-1/8	1:51.40
1957	Gen. Duke	Bill Hartack	Horace A. Jones	Calumet Farm	1-1/8	1:47.40
1956	Liberty Sun	Bill Hartack	Horace A. Jones	Calumet Farm	1-1/8	1:54.00
1955	Prince Noor	John Adams	Harry Trotsek	Hasty House Farm	1-1/8	1:51.00
1954	Maharajah	Ted Atkinson	John M. Gaver Sr.	Greentree Stable	1-1/8	1:49.20
1953	Royal Bay Gem	Jimmy Combest	Clyde Troutt	Eugene Constantin Jr.	1-1/8	1:50.60
1952	One Throw	Keith Stuart	James E. Fitzsimmons	Ogden Phipps	1-1/8	1:52.20
1951	Ken	Ted Atkinson	Jack H. Skirvin	Mrs. Ethel Kendall Weil	1-1/8	
1951	Gray Matter	Logan Batcheller	Frank Barnett	Hal Price Headley	1-1/8	
1950	Oil Capitol	Kenneth Church	Clyde Troutt	Thomas Gray	1-1/8	1:50.00
1949	Reveille	Ovie Scurlock	Winbert F. Mulholland	George D. Widener Jr.	1-1/8	1:51.20
1948	Citation	Albert Snider	Horace A. Jones	Calumet Farm	1-1/8	1:49.00
1947	Riskolater	William Balzaretti	Burton B. Williams	Circle M. Farm	1-1/8	
1946	Alworth	Albert Snider	John B. Partridge	Mrs. Robert D. Patterson	1-1/8	1:51.40
1945	No races					
1941	No races					
1940	Red Mantilla	Alfred Robertson	J. M. Black	Mrs. Hugh Good	0-3/8	0:34.60
1939	Fairy Chant	Maurice Peters	Richard E. Handlen	Foxcatcher Farms	0-3/8	0:34.20
