= Whirlaway Handicap =

- Class: Discontinued stakes
- Location: Washington Park, Chicago, Illinois, USA
- Inaugurated: 1946-1952
- Race type: Thoroughbred - Flat racing

Race information
- Distance: 1 3/16 miles (9.5 furlongs)
- Surface: Dirt
- Track: left-handed
- Qualification: Three-years-old and up
- Purse: U.S.$40,000

The Whirlaway Handicap is a discontinued Thoroughbred horse race run at Washington Park Race Track in Chicago, Illinois. The event was first held on August 21, 1946, and had its final running on August 16, 1952. Open to horses three years of age and older, the race on dirt was run as the Whirlaway Stakes from 1946 to 1951 and for 1952 as the Whirlaway Handicap.

In winning the 1949 race, Coaltown set a new world record for one mile on dirt while beating his Calumet Farm stablemate Ponder who on May 7 had won the 1949 Kentucky Derby.

Race distances:

- 1 3/16 miles : 1952
- 1 1/8 miles : 1946–1948, 1951
- 1 mile : 1949-1950

== Winners ==
| Year | Winner | Age | Jockey | Trainer | Owner | Dist. (Mile) | Time | Purse U.S$. |
|---|---|---|---|---|---|---|---|---|
| 1952 | Crafty Admiral | 4 | Eddie Arcaro | Robert B. Odom | Charfran Stable (Charles & Frances Cohen) | 13/16 M | 1:58.60 | $40,000 |
| 1951 | Wistful | 5 | Steve Brooks | Ben Jones | Calumet Farm | 11/8 M | 1:48.60 | $40,000 |
| 1950 | Curandero | 4 | Darrell Madden | Max Hirsch | King Ranch | 1 M | 1:34.40 | $40,000 |
| 1949 | Coaltown | 4 | Steve Brooks | Jimmy Jones | Calumet Farm | 1 M | 1:34.00 | $40,000 |
| 1948 | Colossal | 5 | Ovie Scurlock | Ivan Parke | Fred W. Hooper | 11/8 M | 1:48.20 | $40,000 |
| 1947 | Armed | 6 | Douglas Dodson | Jimmy Jones | Calumet Farm | 11/8 M | 1:48.60 | $40,000 |
| 1946 | Armed | 5 | Douglas Dodson | Ben Jones | Calumet Farm | 11/8 M | 1:51.20 | $40,000 |
