= Alfred Shelhamer =

American jockey

Al Shelhamer
Personal information
- Born: November 30, 1918 Bayfield, Colorado
- Died: November 7, 1986 (aged 67) Hollywood, California
- Occupations: Jockey, Racetrack Steward

Horse racing career
- Sport: Horse racing

Major racing wins
- Roger Williams Handicap (1938); Santa Maria Stakes (1938); San Vicente Stakes (1938); Eastern Shore Stakes (1939); Laurel Handicap (1939); Old Colony Stakes (1940)

Significant horses
- Level Best, Sun Egret, Whirlaway

Alfred Edwin (Shelly) Shelhamer (November 30, 1918 - November 7, 1986) was an American Thoroughbred horse racing jockey.

Shelhamer rode Sun Egret to a fifth place finish in the 1938 Preakness Stakes won by Dauber. In 1940 he rode Level Best, American Champion Two-Year-Old Filly, to a 5 length victory in the Old Colony Stakes at Narragansett Park. In 1942 he was aboard Sweep Swinger and finished tenth in the Kentucky Derby won by Shut Out. He was under contract to Hall of Fame trainer H. Guy Bedwell and rode most of his races on the Maryland circuit until his retirement in 1945.

The best horse that he rode was U.S. Triple Crown Champion and two time Horse of the Year Whirlaway.

After hanging up his tack, Mr. Shelhamer became a racing official in varying capacities. It was his use of riding knowledge that helped further the use of the Film Patrol in monitoring races at the track. He was one of three stewards at the very first Breeder's Cup at Hollywood Park Racetrack in 1984 that saw the winner Wild Again remain in first position after a roughly run stretch drive. Gate Dancer was taken down from 2nd to 3rd for interference and Slew o' Gold was moved up to second in a race long remembered.

Alfred Shelhamer died in Hollywood, California in 1986.
