= Assault (horse) =

American-bred Thoroughbred racehorse

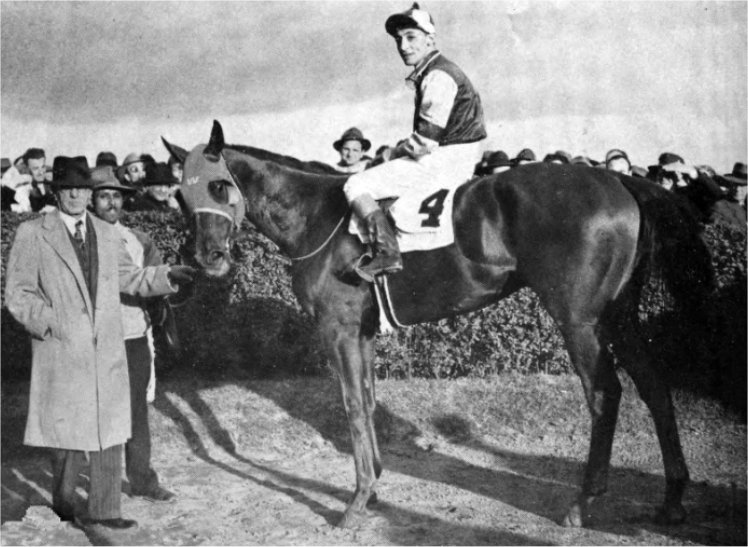
- Assault, with Eddie Arcaro up
- Sire: Bold Venture
- Grandsire: St. Germans
- Dam: Igual
- Damsire: Equipoise
- Sex: Stallion
- Foaled: March 28, 1943
- Died: September 1, 1971 (aged 28)
- Country: United States
- Colour: Chestnut
- Breeder: King Ranch
- Owner: King Ranch
- Trainer: Max Hirsch
- Record: 42: 18-6-7
- Earnings: $675,470

Major wins
- Flash Stakes (1945); Wood Memorial (1946); Dwyer Stakes (1946); Westchester Handicap (1946); Pimlico Special (1946); Butler Handicap (1947); Grey Lag Handicap (1947); Suburban Handicap (1947) Triple Crown race wins: Kentucky Derby (1946); Preakness Stakes (1946); Belmont Stakes (1946)

Awards
- 7th U.S. Triple Crown Champion (1946); U.S. Champion 3-Yr-Old Colt (1946); United States Horse of the Year (1946)

Honours
- United States Racing Hall of Fame (1964) #33 - Top 100 Racehorses of the 20th Century
- Last updated on September 16, 2006

Assault (March 28, 1943 – September 1, 1971) was a champion American Thoroughbred racehorse who is the seventh winner of the American Triple Crown and the only Texas-bred winner of the Triple Crown.

== Early life ==
Assault was bred by Robert J. Kleberg III and sired by Bold Venture, who had won the Kentucky Derby and Preakness Stakes in 1936. His dam was the unraced Igual, by Horse of the Year Equipoise. Assault's third dam was Masda, who was a full sister to Man o' War. His full-brother was Air Lift, who broke a leg in his debut race and was destroyed.

Described as being "on the delicate side" by his later jockey, Eddie Arcaro, Assault was plagued with injuries and illnesses from the start. As a youngster, he stepped on what is believed to have been a surveyor's stake, driving it through his front right hoof. The hoof was permanently deformed, and the colt developed a limp to accommodate the odd shape of his foot; however, the "Club-footed Comet", as he was later dubbed, showed no signs of abnormality when he was at a full gallop. Throughout his career, Assault also overcame kidney, splint bone, fetlock, knee and bleeding problems.

Aside from his physical troubles, Assault faced another major hurdle. He had been foaled and bred at King Ranch, a Texas ranch that primarily raised cattle and Quarter Horses for racing. At the time, the vast majority of major stakes-winners were bred and foaled in Kentucky. To date, Assault remains the only Texas-bred Triple Crown winner.

== Racing career ==
Under Max Hirsch's training, Assault made his racing debut as a two-year-old in 1945, finishing 12th. He had two victories from nine starts that year and won the Flash Stakes in a four-way photo finish. Early in his three-year-old season, he won the Wood Memorial, but his run in the Derby Trial made him an outsider in the Kentucky Derby. With jockey Warren Mehrtens aboard, he raced past rivals to take the first race of the Triple Crown by eight lengths, the largest margin of victory up to that time. Assault was then made the favorite for the Preakness Stakes a week later. Aggravated by traffic early in the race, Mehrtens decided to push Assault earlier than usual. He was four lengths in front with a furlong to go. The tiring Assault scored a neck victory over Lord Boswell.

The handicappers saw this as a stamina issue and made Lord Boswell the favorite in the 1½-mile Belmont Stakes. After stumbling at the start, Assault trailed the field throughout much of the race. In the final 200 yards, he moved past the leaders to win the Belmont by three lengths. He was the seventh Triple Crown winner ever, and the third during the 1940s.

Two weeks after his Belmont victory, Assault won the Dwyer Stakes, and the general public opinion finally conceded that he was the best three-year-old in training (but that it was also a poor crop to choose from). However, his last-place finish in the Arlington Classic made him "just an average horse" again. After the Arlington Classic, it was discovered he had a kidney infection and needed some rest. Assault returned to the track, where he compiled a string of seconds, thirds, and fourths. Trainer Max Hirsch decided to change jockeys. Assault's original rider, Mehrtens, was replaced by Eddie Arcaro. Assault then won the Pimlico Special and Westchester Handicap and was voted 1946 Horse of the Year.

Over the winter, Assault developed into a mature four-year-old. The colt was constantly hungry, charging grooms if he was not fed on time. He paid such close attention to his exercise riders that when it seemed that they were gazing off or not fully attentive, he would leap to the side, leaving them mid-air, and gallop around the track riderless.

As a four-year-old, Assault won five of seven races and never finished worse than third. He was victorious in some of the biggest handicap races in history, including the Brooklyn and Suburban Handicaps, while carrying weights of up to 135 pounds. During 1947, he and his rival Stymie battled for the top money-earner title, swapping it several times. However, in a $100,000 winner-take-all match race at Belmont Park on September 27, 1947, Arcaro and Assault lost by eight lengths to Calumet Farm's Armed, ridden by Douglas Dodson. Armed earned 1947 Horse of the Year honors.

Assault returned to the track as a five-, six-, and seven-year-old, although he did not display the same sort of winning form he showed as a three- and four-year-old.

Assault raced 42 times, with 18 victories (15 in stakes races), 6 second-place finishes, and 7 third-place finishes. He earned $675,470. In 1946, he was voted Horse of the Year, the most prestigious honor in American thoroughbred racing, and won Champion 3-Year-Old honors. In the Horse of the Year poll, conducted by Turf and Sport Digest magazine, Assault received 110 votes to win the title from Armed, who received 37.

== Retirement ==
Assault was originally intended to be retired after his four-year-old season and stand stud alongside his sire at King Ranch. However, none of the mares he was mated with became pregnant; it was apparent that he was sterile. He was returned to racing until the age of seven, where he won a few more races, including one more running of the Brooklyn Handicap. He was then permanently retired to King Ranch. There were some rumors that he was allowed to pasture breed with some of King Ranch's Quarter Horse mares, but there are no records that any of those foals made it to the track. He did sire two Quarter Horse foals, and they were registered with American Quarter Horse Association. Assault was euthanized after falling and breaking his left front leg at the shoulder on September 1, 1971, at age 28. The grave site is on the King Ranch (in Kingsville, Texas).

== Honors ==
Assault was inducted into the National Museum of Racing and Hall of Fame in 1964. In The Blood-Horse ranking of the top 100 U.S. Thoroughbred champions of the 20th Century, Assault was ranked #33.

== Pedigree ==
Pedigree of Assault (USA), chestnut horse, 1943
Sire Bold Venture Ch. 1933	St Germans B. 1921	Swynford	John O' Gaunt
Sire Bold Venture Ch. 1933	St Germans B. 1921	Swynford	Canterbury Pilgrim
Sire Bold Venture Ch. 1933	St Germans B. 1921	Hamoaze	Torpoint
Sire Bold Venture Ch. 1933	St Germans B. 1921	Hamoaze	Maid of the Mist
Sire Bold Venture Ch. 1933	Possible Ch. 1920	Ultimus	Commando*
Sire Bold Venture Ch. 1933	Possible Ch. 1920	Ultimus	Running Stream
Sire Bold Venture Ch. 1933	Possible Ch. 1920	Lida Flush	Royal Flush III
Sire Bold Venture Ch. 1933	Possible Ch. 1920	Lida Flush	Lida H.
Dam Igual Ch. 1937	Equipoise ch. 1928	Pennant	Peter Pan*
Dam Igual Ch. 1937	Equipoise ch. 1928	Pennant	Royal Rose
Dam Igual Ch. 1937	Equipoise ch. 1928	Swinging	Broomstick
Dam Igual Ch. 1937	Equipoise ch. 1928	Swinging	Balancoire II
Dam Igual Ch. 1937	Incandescent B. 1931	Chicle	Spearmint
Dam Igual Ch. 1937	Incandescent B. 1931	Chicle	Lady Hamburg II
Dam Igual Ch. 1937	Incandescent B. 1931	Masda	Fair Play
Dam Igual Ch. 1937	Incandescent B. 1931	Masda	Mahubah

* Assault is inbred 4S x 5D to the stallion Commando, meaning that he appears fourth generation on the sire side of his pedigree, and fifth generation (via Peter Pan) on the dam side of his pedigree.

== See also ==
- List of racehorses
