= Ovie Scurlock =

American jockey (1918–2016)

Personal information
- Born: November 11, 1918 Paintsville, Kentucky, U.S.
- Died: June 14, 2016 (aged 97) Evansville, Indiana, U.S.
- Occupation: Jockey

Horse racing career
- Sport: Horse racing
- Career wins: Not found

Major racing wins
- Arlington Handicap (1946, 1951); Sunset Handicap (1946); Bay Shore Handicap (1947); Correction Handicap (1947, 1953); Discovery Handicap (1947, 1951); Edgemere Handicap (1947); Lawrence Realization Stakes (1947); Trenton Handicap (1947); Roamer Handicap (1947); Empire City Handicap (1948); Philadelphia Handicap (1948); Toboggan Handicap (1948); Whirlaway Handicap (1948); National Stallion Stakes (1949); Remsen Stakes (1949); Washington Park Futurity (1949); Roger Williams Handicap (1949); Arlington Classic (1950); Astoria Stakes (1950); Black Helen Handicap (1950); Comely Stakes (1950); Cowdin Stakes (1950); Dwyer Stakes (1950); Long Branch Stakes (1950); Discovery Handicap (1951); Jerome Handicap (1951); Marguerite Stakes (1951); Pimlico Special (1951); Queens County Handicap (1951); Questionnaire Handicap (1951); Westchester Handicap (1951); Bahamas Stakes (1952); Fashion Stakes (1953); National Stallion Stakes (filly division) (1953); Matron Stakes (1953); Sanford Stakes (1953); Schuylerville Stakes (1953); Spinaway Stakes (1953); Gallant Fox Handicap (1954); Hanshin Cup Handicap (1954); Molly Pitcher Handicap (1956); Champlain Handicap (1957)

Significant horses
- Battlefield, Coaltown, Cochise; Greek Money, Evening Out, Bryan G.

Ovie Scurlock (November 11, 1918 – June 14, 2016) was an American jockey in Thoroughbred horse racing.

Born in Paintsville, Kentucky, Scurlock began his professional riding career in 1938 at Fairmount Park Racetrack in Collinsville, Illinois. A year later, on August 26, 1939, at Ellis Park Racecourse in Henderson, Kentucky, he rode a three-year-old colt, Mr. Ambassador, to a world record time of 1:39 2/5 for a mile and 40 yards.

His career was interrupted during World War II when he served his country in the U.S. Coast Guard during World War II.

During his career, Scurlock rode for prominent owners such as George D. Widener Jr., Harry Guggenheim, Ada L. Rice, and Herbert M. Woolf. He was also a regular rider during the early 1950s for the Brandywine Stable of Donald P. Ross as well as one of the riders for Calumet Farm.

On June 11, 1949, he rode Coaltown, Calumet's Handicap Horse of the Year of 1949, to victory in the Roger Williams Handicap at Narragansett Park.

Scurlock won a number of important races of his era, such as the Lawrence Realization Stakes in New York, the Arlington Classic in Chicago, and the Pimlico Special in Baltimore. He competed in the Kentucky Derby three times and the Preakness Stakes once with his best result a seventh in both races in 1949 aboard Model Cadet.

When his riding days were over, Scurlock worked as an assistant trainer for Warren A. Croll Jr.

Ovie Scurlock died June 14, 2016, at St. Mary's Medical Center in Evansville, Indiana, USA.
