= Coaltown =

American-bred Thoroughbred racehorse

- Sire: Bull Lea
- Grandsire: Bull Dog
- Dam: Easy Lass
- Damsire: Blenheim
- Sex: Stallion
- Foaled: 1945
- Died: 1965 (aged 19–20)
- Country: United States
- Colour: Bay
- Breeder: Calumet Farm
- Owner: Calumet Farm
- Trainer: Ben A. Jones & Horace A. Jones
- Record: 39: 23-6-3
- Earnings: $415,675

Major wins
- Phoenix Handicap (1948); Jerome Handicap (1948); Blue Grass Stakes (1948); Swift Stakes (1948); Stars & Stripes Handicap (1949); Gallant Fox Handicap (1949); Widener Handicap (1949); Gulfstream Park Handicap (1949); Arlington Handicap (1949); McLennan Handicap (1949); Roger Williams Handicap (1949); Washington Park Handicap (1949); Whirlaway Stakes (1949) Triple Crown Races placing: Kentucky Derby 2nd (1948)

Awards
- U.S. Champion Sprint Horse (1948); Handicap Horse of the Year (1949); Turf & Sport Digest Horse of the Year (1949)

Honours
- United States Racing Hall of Fame (1983) #47 - Top 100 U.S. Racehorses of the 20th Century
- Last updated on December 29, 2007

Coaltown (1945–1965) was an American Hall of Fame Champion Thoroughbred racehorse of whom The New York Times said "was probably the most underrated Thoroughbred of the 20th Century."

Coaltown was nicknamed "The Goose" by the stable employees at Calumet Farm for his way of outstretching his long, thin neck when he ran. Racing at age three in 1948, he was overshadowed by stablemate Citation, finishing second to him in the Kentucky Derby. Citation became the 8th U.S. Triple Crown Champion. Coaltown, meanwhile, won eight of his thirteen starts. He won the Blue Grass Stakes in track record time and at the end of the year was voted 1948's U.S. Champion Sprint Horse.

In 1949, injuries kept Citation from racing, allowing Coaltown to show how good he really was. He won twelve of his fifteen races, and set or matched several U.S. and world records including:

1. A new world record for the mile at Washington Park Race Track in the Whirlaway Stakes.
2. Equaled the world record and set a new track record for 1 1/4 miles at Gulfstream Park
3. Equaled the world record and set a new track record for 1 1/8 miles at Hialeah Park
4. Set a new track record for 1 1/8 miles at Arlington Park
5. Equaled the track record for six furlongs at Hollywood Park Racetrack

In his final race of 1949, Coaltown was a badly beaten 2nd to 1949 arch-rival Capot in the Pimlico Special. Nonetheless, his performances that year earned him Handicap Horse of the Year honors. He was voted United States Horse of the Year in a nationwide poll in which he defeated Capot by 102 votes to 71. Capot had earlier been named Horse of the Year by the Daily Racing Form.

After mediocre performances in 1950 and '51, Coaltown was retired to stud at Calumet Farm, where he had only limited success as a sire. In 1955, he was sold to Haras de Jardy in Marnes-la-Coquette, France where he died at the age of 20 in 1965.

Coaltown was inducted into the United States' National Museum of Racing and Hall of Fame in 1983.
