= Hibiscus Stakes =

The Hibiscus Stakes was an American Thoroughbred horse race run annually at Hialeah Park Race Track in Hialeah, Florida from 1936 through 2001 when the racetrack ceased operations. In its final years, the race was run in mid May for fillies and mares, age three and up. Previously, it was a seven furlong race for three-year-old fillies from 1977 to 1994, but before that it was run each January at six furlongs on dirt for three-year-olds of either sex and was one of the first important races for those looking to get to the Kentucky Derby, first leg of the United States Triple Crown of Thoroughbred Racing|U.S. Triple Crown series.

Notable winners of the Hibiscus Stakes include Relic (1948), Gallant Man (1957), Bally Ache (1960), Ridan (1962), Hail To All (1965), Forward Pass (1968), and Riva Ridge (1972).

The race was run as the Hibiscus Handicap on the turf at Gulfstream Park in 2000.
