= Herbert M. Woolf =

American racehorse owner (1880–1964)

Herbert M. Woolf (October 11, 1880 – September 22, 1964) was an American businessman and Thoroughbred racehorse owner.

Herbert Morris Woolf was born on October 11, 1880, and graduated from Central High School in 1898. He was the president of Woolf Brothers, the Kansas City based luxury goods department store founded in 1865 by his father, Alfred Woolf and his uncle, Samuel Woolf. Woolf was also the owner of Woolford Farm, which produced the only ever Kansas bred Kentucky Derby winner, Lawrin of 1938 along with several other champion race horses. Woolf is also a cousin of British political theorist Leonard Woolf, husband of Virginia Woolf.

== Woolf Brothers ==
Samuel and Alfred Woolf came to Leavenworth, Kansas in 1865, after the Civil War, from their native New York. There, they established a store where fine men's shirts were made and sold. By June 1879, Kansas City had become the region's urban commercial center and the business was accordingly relocated there, where it prospered.

Herbert Woolf began working for the business in his twenties, first as a collector, and worked his way up to a window decorator, to a buyer, to a junior partner. He then assumed control of the business in 1915, when his father died.

For over thirty years, Woolf Brothers expanded and thrived under Herbert to become one of the largest and most revered luxury goods department stores in the Midwest, with branches in five other major cities. Alfred Lighton assumed control of the business in 1962 and remained there until 1992 when major changes in the retail clothing industry and other economic factors caused Woolf Brothers to permanently close its doors.

== Woolford Farm ==
Herbert Woolf's greatest accomplishments lay in horse racing which he pursued at his 200-acre (0.81 km^{2}) Woolford Farm in eastern Kansas. In addition to being a Thoroughbred horse farm, it was a country retreat where Woolf threw parties whose guests included Theodore Roosevelt and the infamous Tom Pendergast.

In 1933, Woolf paid $500 for Insco (1928–1939), a son of the great sire Sir Gallahad III. Insco would sire a number of successful stakes winners including two by the mare, Margaret Lawrence. Their first was the 1938 Kentucky Derby winner, Lawrin, and the second the 1940 Kentucky Oaks winner, Inscolassie. Lawrin won the 64th running of the Kentucky Derby, beating C. V. Whitney's colt, Dauber. Lawrin's jockey was U.S. Racing Hall of Fame inductee, Eddie Arcaro. His trainer was another Hall of Fame inductee, Ben A. Jones. Lawrin is buried next to his sire at the former Woolford Farm, now Prairie Village, Kansas.

Woolf had hired Ben Jones after he had established a reputation of training and breeding horses at the family ranch in Parnell, Missouri. Ben was accompanied by his son Jimmy Jones. After Lawrin won the Kentucky Derby the two trainers went to work for Warren Wright, Sr. at Calumet Farm. At Calumet the two trained seven horses that won the Kentucky Derby including two Triple Crown of Thoroughbred Racing winners.
