= Armed =

American-bred Thoroughbred racehorse

- Sire: Bull Lea
- Grandsire: Bull Dog
- Dam: Armful
- Damsire: Chance Shot
- Sex: Gelding
- Foaled: 1941
- Country: United States
- Colour: Brown
- Breeder: Calumet Farm
- Owner: Calumet Farm
- Trainer: Ben A. Jones
- Record: 81: 41-20-10
- Earnings: $817,475

Major wins
- Washington Handicap (1945); Philadelphia Handicap (1946); Suburban Handicap (1946); Widener Handicap (1946, 1947); Washington Park Handicap (1946, 1947); Whirlaway Stakes (1946, 1947); Stars and Stripes Handicap (1947); Gulfstream Park Handicap (1947); Arlington Handicap (1947); McLennan Memorial Handicap (1947)

Awards
- American Champion Older Male Horse (1946, 1947); American Horse of the Year (1947)

Honours
- National Museum of Racing and Hall of Fame (1963) #39 - Top 100 U.S. Racehorses of the 20th Century
- Last updated on October 12, 2007

Armed (May, 1941–1964) was an American Thoroughbred gelding race horse who was the American Horse of the Year in 1947 and Champion Older Male Horse in both 1946 and 1947. He was inducted into the National Museum of Racing and Hall of Fame in 1963.

== Background ==
Armed was sired by the stakes winner Bull Lea, the sire of Citation. His dam was Armful, whose sire was Belmont Stakes winner Chance Shot and whose grandsire was the great Fair Play.

Besides being small for his age and very headstrong, Armed had the habits of biting and kicking hay out of his handler's pitchfork. Since he was also practically untrainable, his trainer, Ben A. Jones, sent him back to Calumet Farm to be gelded and turned out to grow up. He returned to the track late in his two-year-old season and resumed training.

== Racing career ==
His first start was as a three-year-old the following February, and he won at Hialeah Park by eight lengths. He won again less than a week later but then won only once in five more starts and had to be rested due to an ankle injury.

Armed raced for seven seasons, from 1944 to 1950, finishing with a 41–20–10 record in 81 starts. On April 20, 1946, under jockey Douglas Dodson Armed broke the track record for a mile and a sixteenth on dirt with a winning time of 1:43 1/5 in the Philadelphia Handicap at the Havre de Grace Racetrack. In 1947, again ridden by jockey Dodson, he defeated U.S. Triple Crown champion Assault in a match race at Belmont Park and set a track record of 2:01-3/5 for one and one-quarter miles while winning the Widener Handicap and carrying 129 pounds. He repeated as American Champion Older Male Horse and was voted 1947 American Horse of the Year honors. In the Horse of the Year poll conducted by Turf and Sport Digest magazine, he received 151 of a possible 173 votes to win the title from Citation, Stymie, Bewitch and Assault.

== Retirement and death ==
Armed died in 1964 of an intestinal tumor. In 1963, he was inducted into National Museum of Racing and Hall of Fame. In The Blood-Horse ranking of the top 100 U.S. thoroughbred champions of the 20th Century, he was ranked #39.
