= Roger Williams Handicap =

American Thoroughbred horse race

The Roger Williams Handicap was an American Thoroughbred horse race run annually at Narragansett Park in Pawtucket, Rhode Island and named for the founder of the State of Rhode Island. The track sat on land just west of the Ten Mile River which Roger Williams traveled down after being banished from Massachusetts in 1636. The track management had purchased the land from the former What Cheer Airport in 1934. Curiously, “What cheer, Netop” were the words called out by the Narragansett Indians when Roger Williams first set foot in the place he was to call "Providence". Only the word Netop − meaning "friend" − is Indian and the phrase was meant as a greeting.

The first big Saturday stakes race run at Narragansett Park was the $7,500 added Roger Williams Handicap. On August 4, 1934, C.V. Whitney's Roustabout won by a head with jockey Al Robertson aboard. The first five editions were run at one mile.

The 1935 race saw Advising Anna set a track record of 1:37 that would never be broken. As Narragansett was a one-mile track, this led to a short run to the first turn and the one mile distance was seldom used. Fair Knightess, who had gained notoriety for her Massachusetts Handicap battle with Seabiscuit, won the race in 1937 and was soon purchased by Charles S. Howard.

After a two-year hiatus the Roger Williams Handicap was reinstated at the distance of 1 1/16th mile. From 1941 to 1948 the added money event was held at this distance and drew top handicap horses, owners, trainers and jockeys to the track. In 1946 it was W. G. Loew's Helioptic winning the $13,275 event before a post-war crowd of more than 30,000 that bet 1.79 million dollars. Helioptic had been bred by the famous Coldstream Stud of Kentucky.

In 1949, the purse was up to $16,700 and the race was extended to 1 3/16 mile, the same distance as the prestigious Narragansett Special. Before a big weekend gathering it was Calumet Farm's Coaltown winning by 12 lengths in a performance that led trainer H.A. Jones to send Coaltown to Chicago. He proceeded to win four big races of the Midwest, set a new world record for the mile (1:34), and was named Handicap Horse of the Year. Those that saw him run would remember the experience for years. Coaltown would be inducted into the National Museum of Racing and Hall of Fame in 1983.

By its last four runnings, the Roger Williams Handicap served as a prep race for the much richer Narragansett Special as the Rhode Island Handicap was discontinued. On October 30, 1954 the Roger Williams Handicap was dusted off one last time and run at 1 1/16 miles. Red Head Stable's Futuresque, with Paul Bohenko up, won the race by a length and a half in the mud at 8−1 on the tote board.

== Winners ==
Year	Winner	Age	Jockey	Trainer	Owner	Time
1954	Futuresque	7	Paul Bohenko	R. E. Harper	Red Head Stable	1:47
1953	Blue Dare	4	Chris Rogers	A. J. Zolman	Emerald Hill Stable	1:46
1952	Larry Ellis	4	Anthony DeSpirito	J. M. Lingle	Mrs. J. M. Lingle	1:43 4/5
1951	Abstract	4	Gene Peterson	H. J. Stonebridge	Cobble Stable	1:45 3/5
1950	no race
1949	Coaltown	4	Ovie Scurlock	Horace A. Jones	Calumet Farm	1:57
1948	Misleader	5	Walter L. Taylor	A. Dupaquier	Circle K Farm	1:44 1/5
1947	Spangled Game	6	Ray Ranum	Ray Metcalf	Mrs Ray Metcalf	1:44 2/5
1946	Helioptic	4	Joe Licausi	Harris Brown	W. G. Loew	1:48 3/5
1945	Spangled Game	4	Ray Ranum	Ray Metcalf	Mrs Ray Metcalf	1:54 4/5
1944	Loveday	8	George McMullen	W. R. Flemming	Mrs. W. R. Flemming	1:45 3/5
1943	Devalue	5	Marcus Pena	J. Johnson	H. H. Haag	1:44 2/5
1942	Grasshopper II	5	Bobby Strange	Earl H. Beezly	Beezly + Cohen	1:45
1941	Topee	5	Ted Atkinson	W. T. Freeman	Tally Ho Stable	1:45 4/5
1940	no race
1939	no race
1938	Sun Egret	3	Al Shelhamer	H. Guy Bedwell	A. C. Compton	1:40 3/5
1937	Fair Knightess	4	Robert Howell	E. B. McGehee	Hobson C. McGehee	1:37 2/5
1936	Appealing	3	Larry McDermott	H. C. Wolfe	Motor City Stable	1:39 2/5
1935	Advising Anna	5	Nick Wall	E. Haughton	Mrs. Floyd West	1:37 (NTR)
1934	Roustabout	3	Alfred M. Robertson	T. J. Healy	C. V. Whitney	1:39
