= Maurice Peters =

American jockey

Personal information
- Born: May 14, 1917 Brantford, Eddy County, North Dakota
- Died: April 6, 1987 (aged 69) Charles Town, West Virginia
- Resting place: Edge Hill Cemetery, Charles Town, West Virginia
- Occupations: Jockey, Trainer, Owner

Horse racing career
- Sport: Horse racing

Major racing wins
- Astoria Stakes (1936); Chesapeake Stakes (1936); Great American Stakes (1936); Philadelphia Handicap (1936, 1939, 1940); W. P. Burch Memorial Handicap (1936); Christmas Stakes (1936); National Stallion Stakes (1936); New Castle Handicap (1937, 1941); Nursery Handicap (1937); Santa Anita Derby (1937); Prince George Autumn Handicap (1938); Saratoga Cup (1938); Alabama Stakes (1939); Everglades Stakes (1939); Hialeah Stakes (1939); Polly Drummond Stakes (1939); Champlain Handicap (1940); Kent Stakes (1940); Havre de Grace Handicap (1941) American Classic Race wins: Preakness Stakes (1938)

Racing awards
- United States Champion Jockey by wins (1934); Oaklawn Park Champion Jockey (1934)

Significant horses
- Seabiscuit, War Admiral, Dauber, Dotted Swiss, Fairy Hill, Jacola, Mate, Pompoon

Maurice Wilbur "Moose" Peters (May 14, 1917 – April 6, 1987) was a jockey in Thoroughbred horse racing who accomplished the remarkable feat of winning a national riding title while still a seventeen-year-old apprentice.

In 1938, Peters rode Dauber in all three of the U.S. Triple Crown races. They finished second to winner Lawrin in the Kentucky Derby, won the Preakness Stakes by seven lengths, and ran second to Pasteurized in the Belmont Stakes.

Maurice Peters was one of the founding members when the Jockeys Community Fund and Guild was formed in 1940.

In 1945, Peters began working as a trainer.
