= Washington Park Race Track =

Historic horse racetrack in Chicago (1884–1977)

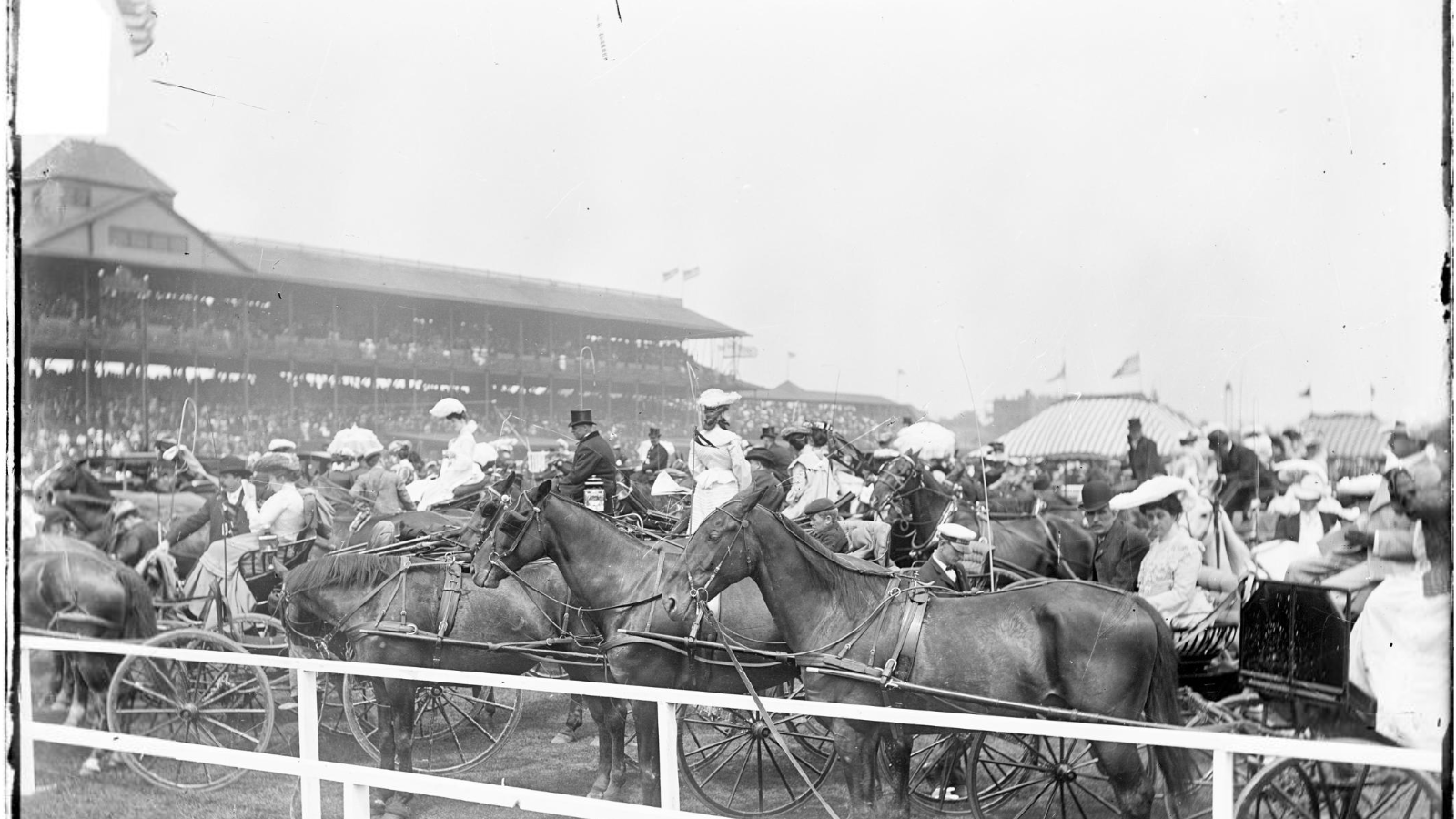
- Washington Park Race Track, Derby Day 1903.
- Interactive map of Washington Park Race Track
- Location: 61st Street and Cottage Grove, Chicago Cook County, Illinois
- Coordinates: 41°46′55″N 87°36′39″W
- Owned by: Washington Park Jockey Club
- Date opened: 1884
- Date closed: 1977

Washington Park Race Track was a popular horse racing venue in the Chicago metropolitan area from 1884 until 1977. It had two locations during its existence. It was first situated at what became the Washington Park Subdivision of the Woodlawn community area of Chicago in Cook County, Illinois, United States. This is immediately south of both the Washington Park community area and Washington Park. The track was later relocated to Homewood, Illinois, which is also in Cook County.

The original track and its accompanying Jockey Club were social draws in the late 19th century, but modern developments and changes in the betting laws led to the decline of both. In its prime, the track was an especially important social gathering place on opening day and the day of the American Derby, which ranked as one of horse racing's highest purses. The Jockey Club, designed by Solon Spencer Beman, hosted a social gathering led by General Philip Sheridan, who was an early leader of the track and club. The track was closed and reopened according to the contemporary state and local laws on gambling and eventually waned in popularity and social importance.

Over the years, numerous famous horses and jockeys appeared at the track. In the 19th century, horses such as Emperor of Norfolk and Domino raced. In the 20th century, some of the Thoroughbreds to race at Washington Park included Triple Crown winners Citation and Whirlaway. Other horses included Native Dancer and Swaps, who each won legs of the Triple Crown. Jockey Eddie Arcaro won both the 1948 and 1953 American Derby races at the track. In addition to the American Derby, several other graded stakes races were run at the track such as the Stars and Stripes Turf Handicap and the Washington Park Handicap. In addition, match races were held at the track.

== Original track ==
In 1883, a group of about 500 Chicagoans, led by General Philip Sheridan, banded together to create the Washington Park Jockey Club. Selecting a location at 61st and Cottage Grove, the Club opened and operated the Washington Park Race Track, valued at $150,000, the following year, claiming it to be "the Midwest's preeminent track." The track was part of the long tradition of constructing special facilities for sporting events and public assembly in the Chicago parks. At that time it was fashionable for the social elite to maintain close ties to equestrian sports. Some owned Thoroughbreds and thus were members of the Washington Park Jockey Club. The track's clubhouse, which was completed in 1896, was designed by Solon Spencer Beman, and C. B. McDonald built a short nine-hole club members' golf course in the infield of the track.

=== Major races ===
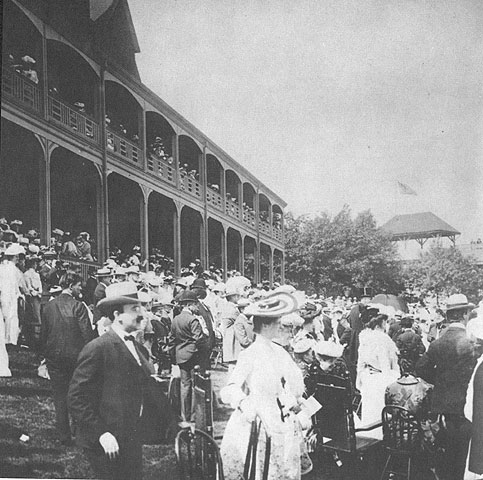
Grandstands at original track, c. 1900

Each June, the track sponsored the American Derby, which had a purse ranked among the highest in the country. When Washington Park Race Track first organized the American Derby in 1883, General Philip Sheridan served as its first President. By 1893, the American Derby was the 2nd richest American race in the 19th century. Both The American Derby and Opening Day (the first race of the season) became important social calendar dates. Residents of elite late 19th century neighborhoods organized a number of related public activities outside the track grounds, including the annual Washington Park Race Track opening day parade.

Horse racing was not the only draw of the track. In 1900, a race was staged at the track between a gasoline-powered automobile and an electrically powered automobile. At the time, there were more electric cars in the country than gasoline-powered ones. The race in Chicago was the first time a gasoline-powered car beat an electric-powered one in a race.

=== Decline and closure of the original track ===
The track ran into difficulties when Hempstead Washburne was elected Mayor of Chicago in 1892. In 1893, he began a gambling reform campaign, which included a goal of closing all race tracks in Chicago. His campaign eventually resulted in the 1894 closure of Washington Park Race Track, although the track reopened in 1898. In 1905, a standing room only crowd at the track watched the finale of the first annual Chicago Marathon foot race. The track closed later in 1905, when the state of Illinois banned gambling and stopped all horse racing. By that time, the prestige of the club had declined, independently of Washburne's reform movement, because more modern and spacious golf courses drew the members to other locations, and the residential dispersion of elite members from the community area made the club less important. However, the stables used by the track were not torn down and currently form a portion of the DuSable Museum of African-American History.

== New track ==
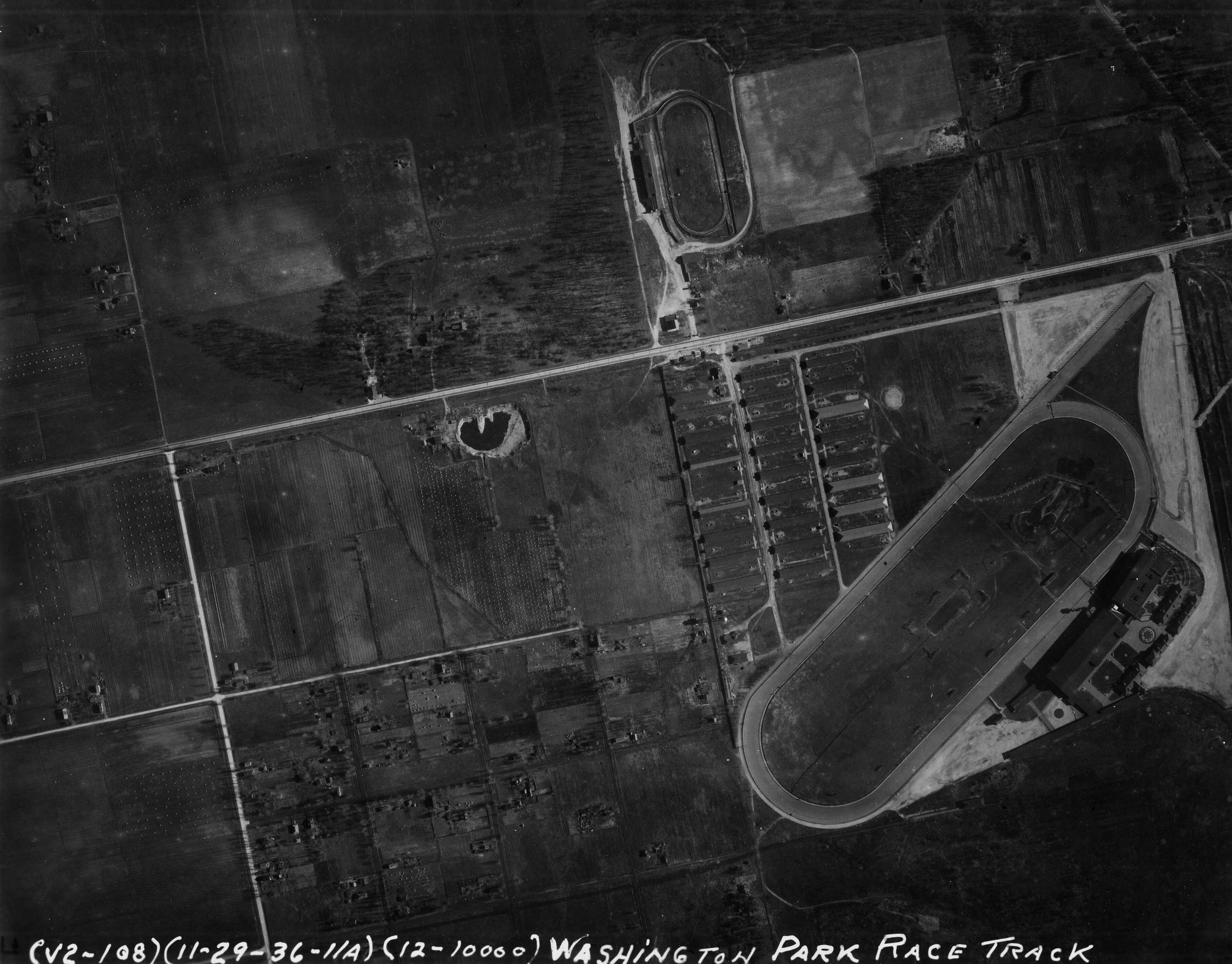
Aerial image of both tracks, 1936

A diagram of the "new" race track in 1977, before the grandstand burned.

In 1926, a second Washington Park Race Track opened up in south suburban Homewood. The new Washington Park Race Track was located west of Halsted Street just outside Homewood village bounds. The Illinois Central Railroad built a spur line from its mainline at Harvey to the newly relocated race track. The relocated track continued to be a famous and popular attraction. The inaugural meeting of organizers was July 3, 1926. The new track was developed during a construction boom of racetracks in the United States during the 1920s, which included fifteen new large racetracks built during the decade. Others constructed at this time were Arlington Park nearby in Chicago and Hialeah Park in Florida.

Benjamin F. Lindheimer purchased Washington Park Race Track in 1935 and owned it until his death in 1960. Long involved with the business, adopted daughter Marjorie Lindheimer Everett then took over management of the racetracks.

The American Derby was also reborn at the new track, and was run at Washington through 1957, when it was moved to Arlington Park, in northwest suburban Arlington Heights. However, racing venues had previously shifted between Chicago-area tracks. For example, in 1943, Arlington Park shifted its major races to Washington Park as a result of curtailed racing due to World War II.

Another significant race run at the new track was the Grade 2 stakes Washington Park Handicap for three-year-olds and up. It was first held at Washington Park in 1926, and continued to be held there until 1958, when it was moved to Arlington Park, where it continues to be held to the present day and commemorates the Washington Park racetrack.

The new track hosted a number of special races between famous horses of the day. On August 29, 1945 a match race between Busher and Durazna was held at the racetrack. The distance was one mile, with a purse of $25,000.00. Busher won by almost two lengths, after the lead changed several times during the race. On August 31, 1955, Washington Park hosted a match race between Nashua and Swaps with a distance of a mile and a quarter. The purse was $100,000.00. Nashua won by several lengths, having led the entire race. The race was well attended, and attracted reporters from across the country. Nashua went on to be named Horse of the Year for 1955.

However, in spite of popular events, the track was not without scandals and allegations of misdeeds. For example, in 1970, Marge Lindheimer Everett, manager of both Arlington and Washington Park, confessed to having bribed Illinois Governor Otto Kerner to gain premium racing dates.

Washington Park Race Track's grandstand burned on the night of February 5, 1977, putting the track out of business. The property was sold and redeveloped in 1992 for commercial and residential use. A plaque was dedicated in 2012 along Halsted Street to commemorate the track.

== Horses who raced at Washington Park ==
- Emperor of Norfolk won the 1888 American Derby
- Domino won the 1893 Hyde Park Stakes
- Whirlaway won the 1941 American Derby
- Citation won the 1948 American Derby in the same year he won the Triple Crown, with Eddie Arcaro up
- Coaltown won the 1949 Whirlaway Stakes, setting a new world mile mark while doing so
- Native Dancer won the 1953 American Derby, with Eddie Arcaro up
- Swaps won the 1956 Washington Park Handicap and the 1955 American Derby, where he set the record for that race that still stood in 2006.
- T. V. Lark won the American Derby and Washington Park Handicap in 1961

== Other stakes races run at the racetrack ==
- Sheridan Stakes began in 1884, ran at the old and new racetracks
- Washington Park Handicap began 1926, moved to Arlington Park in 1958
- Washington Park Futurity Stakes - inaugurated in 1937, it was a race for two-year-olds. In 1959, the race was moved to Chicago's Arlington Park race track, and in 1962 was merged with the Arlington Futurity Stakes to create the Arlington-Washington Futurity Stakes. It is now the Arlington-Washington Futurity.
- Stars and Stripes Handicap only ran at second Washington Park in 1943, 1944 and 1945 and again in 1958 and 1959
- Arlington Handicap ran at Washington Park in 1943, 1944 and 1945
- Misty Isle Handicap from inception in 1946 through 1958 then transferred to Arlington Park
- Whirlaway Handicap run 1946 through 1952.

Preceding station	Illinois Central Railroad	Following station
Terminus	Electric Suburban Washington Park Branch	Harvey Terminus
