= Tom Mercer Girdler =

American industrialist (1877–1965)

Tom Mercer Girdler (19 May 1877 – 4 February 1965) was an American businessman who was the first president of Republic Steel.

== Biography ==
Girdler was born in Silver Creek, Clark County, Indiana in 1877. He graduated with a mechanical engineering degree from Lehigh University. After his graduation, he started his career with Buffalo Forge Company. A year later, he became a foreman for the Oliver Iron and Steel Company.

In 1943, he published his autobiography.

He retired in 1956 as the chairperson of Republic Steel.

== Personal life ==
Girdler married four times and had two sons and two daughters.
