= Lawrin =

American-bred Thoroughbred racehorse

- Sire: Insco
- Grandsire: Sir Gallahad III
- Dam: Margaret Lawrence
- Damsire: Vulcain
- Sex: Stallion
- Foaled: 1935
- Country: United States
- Color: Brown
- Breeder: Woolford Farm
- Owner: Woolford Farm
- Trainer: Ben A. Jones
- Record: 26: 9-8-2
- Earnings: $126,275

Major wins
- Hialeah Stakes (1938); Flamingo Stakes (1938); Hollywood Trial Stakes (1938); American Invitational 3YO Championship (1938); U.S. Triple Crown wins: Kentucky Derby (1938)
- Last updated on October 30, 2020

Lawrin (May 15, 1935 – September 1, 1955) was an American thoroughbred racehorse owned by Herbert M. Woolf who won the 1938 Kentucky Derby. He was the son of Insco. He is the only Kansas-bred winner of the Kentucky Derby and the first Kentucky Derby winner ridden by the great jockey Eddie Arcaro. Lawrin died in 1955 and was buried next to his sire, Insco, on Woolford Farm in what would become Prairie Village, Kansas. One can still visit his grave in the cul-de-sac at 59 Le Mans Court, Prairie Village, just northwest of Mission Road & Somerset.

== Racing career ==
Lawrin was trained by U.S. Racing Hall of Fame Ben Jones He made 23 starts before the Derby in 1938, notably winning the Hialeah Stakes and the Flamingo Stakes at Florida's Hialeah Park. Following his Derby win, Lawrin was raced in California where he won the Hollywood Trial Stakes plus the American Invitational 3-Year-Old Championship at California's newly opened Hollywood Park Racetrack.

== The Kentucky Derby ==
During the race, Arcaro took Lawrin to an early 3-length lead keeping to the rail. However, Lawrin started to tire with an eighth of a mile to go and drifted to the middle of the track. Future Hall of Fame jockey Eddie Arcaro, who got the first of his five Derby wins, urged him on and was able keep the lead from a furiously gaining Dauber. Lawrin won over a field that also included Menow, Fighting Fox, and Bull Lea.

Lawrin did not run in the Preakness and Belmont Stakes, the remaining two U.S. Triple Crown series.

On April 14, 2007, on behalf of the Village Council, the Mayor of Prairie Village, Kansas proclaimed Saturday, May 5, 2007, to be Lawrin's Legacy Day.
