= Flamingo Stakes =

- Class: Defunct Stakes
- Location: Hialeah Park Race Track; Hialeah, Florida, United States
- Inaugurated: 1926
- Race type: Thoroughbred – Flat racing
- Website: N/A

Race information
- Distance: 1 1/8 miles (9 furlongs)
- Surface: Dirt
- Track: left-handed
- Qualification: Three-year-olds
- Weight: Assigned

The Flamingo Stakes was an American Thoroughbred horse race for three-year-old horses run over a distance of a mile and one-eighth. Run as the Florida Derby until 1937, the inaugural event took place at Tampa Downs on February 27, 1926. There was no race in 1927 and 1928 but was revived in 1929 at Hialeah Park Race Track.

== Historical race notes ==
In 1937, Court Scandal won the first edition of the renamed Flamingo Stakes for owner Townsend B. Martin, an investment banker, polo player, and former part owner of the New York Jets football team.

With the introduction of the grading system for races in 1973, the Flamingo Stakes was given Grade I status which it held through 1989. Run in March or early April, for many years it was a very important early prep race for the Kentucky Derby. Nine winners of this race went on to win the Derby: Lawrin (1938), Faultless (1947) Citation (1948), Needles (1956), Tim Tam (1958), Carry Back (1961), Northern Dancer (1964), Foolish Pleasure (1975), Seattle Slew (1977), Spectacular Bid (1979).

In 1948, Citation won the Flamingo Stakes under regular jockey Al Snider. Six days later, Snider drowned while out fishing in the Florida Keys; Eddie Arcaro replaced him on Citation, going on to win the U.S. Triple Crown.

The Flamingo Stakes was run in two divisions in 1952.

Chief's Crown finished first in the 1985 Flamingo Stakes but was disqualified to second. A successful appeal was reported by The Washington Post as "Racing officials in Florida redressed an injustice yesterday and made Chief's Crown the official winner of the Flamingo Stakes."

Hialeah Park racetrack ran into financial problems and in 2001 the facility ceased racing operations. Frank Stronach's Thunder Blitz won the final running of the Flamingo Stakes.

== Records ==
Speed record:

- 1:46.80 @ 1 1/8 miles : Honest Pleasure (1976)

Most wins by a jockey:

- 4 – Eddie Arcaro (1942, 1944, 1955, 1957)
- 4 – Jorge Velásquez (1967, 1978, 1986, 1988)
- 4 – Jacinto Vásquez (1971, 1973, 1975, 1980)

Most wins by a trainer:

- 4 – Ben A. Jones (1938, 1939, 1947, 1948)

Most wins by an owner:

- 4 – Calumet Farm (1947, 1948, 1958, 1978)

== Winners ==
Year	Winner	Age	Jockey	Trainer	Owner	Dist. (Miles)	Time	Grade
2001	Thunder Blitz	3	Edgar Prado	Joe Orseno	Frank Stronach	11/8 M	1:48.23	G3
2000	Trippi	3	Eibar Coa	Todd Pletcher	Dogwood Stable	11/8 M	1:50.04	G3
1999	First American	3	José Vélez Jr.	Eduardo C. Caramori	TNT Stud	11/8 M	1:48.90	G3
1998	Chilito	3	Gary Boulanger	H. Graham Motion	Joe Albritton	11/8 M	1:49.60	G3
1997	Frisk Me Now	3	Edwin L. King Jr.	Robert J. Durso	Carol R. Dender	11/8 M	1:52.32	G3
1996	El Amante	3	Ramon Perez	William I. Mott	Jack H. Smith III	11/8 M	1:49.20	G3
1995	Pyramid Peak	3	Herb McCauley	John T. Ward Jr.	John C. Oxley	11/8 M	1:48.00	G3
1994	Meadow Flight	3	Craig Perret	James T. Ryerson	Ben J. Aliyuee Stables	11/8 M	1:49.60	G3
1993	Forever Whirl	3	Abdiel Toribio	Marty Wolfson	Irving Ellis & Alan Reskin	11/8 M	1:51.20	Listed
1992	Pistols and Roses	3	Heberto Castillo Jr.	George Gianos	Willis Family Stables	11/8 M	1:50.79	Listed
1990	– 1991	Race not held						
1989	Awe Inspiring	3	Craig Perret	Claude R. McGaughey III	Ogden Phipps	11/8 M	1:49.60	G1
1988	Cherokee Colony	3	Jorge Velásquez	John P. Campo	Buckland Farm	11/8 M	1:49.40	G1
1987	Talinum	3	Ángel Cordero Jr.	D. Wayne Lukas	Nelson Bunker Hunt	11/8 M	1:50.00	G1
1986	Badger Land	3	Jorge Velásquez	D. Wayne Lukas	D. Wayne Lukas	11/8 M	1:47.00	G1
1985	Chief's Crown	3	Don MacBeth	Roger Laurin	Star Crown Stable	11/8 M	1:48.40	G1
1984	Time For A Change	3	Jerry Bailey	Angel Penna Sr.	Ogden Mills Phipps	11/8 M	1:47.00	G1
1983	Current Hope	3	Alex Solis	Roger Laurin	Kaskel, Bakera, Levey, Laurin	11/8 M	1:49.40	G1
1982	Timely Writer	3	Jeffrey Fell	Dominic Imprescia	Peter & Francis Martin	11/8 M	1:49.60	G1
1981	Tap Shoes	3	Ruben Hernandez	Horatio Luro	Leone J. Peters	11/8 M	1:49.20	G1
1980	Superbity	3	Jacinto Vásquez	Melvin Calvert	Frances A. Genter	11/8 M	1:51.20	G1
1979	Spectacular Bid	3	Ron Franklin	Bud Delp	Hawksworth Farm (Harry Meyerhoff)	11/8 M	1:48.40	G1
1978	Alydar	3	Jorge Velásquez	John M. Veitch	Calumet Farm	11/8 M	1:47.00	G1
1977	Seattle Slew	3	Jean Cruguet	William H. Turner Jr.	Karen & Mickey Taylor	11/8 M	1:47.40	G1
1976	Honest Pleasure	3	Braulio Baeza	LeRoy Jolley	Bertram R. Firestone	11/8 M	1:46.80	G1
1975	Foolish Pleasure	3	Jacinto Vásquez	LeRoy Jolley	John L. Greer	11/8 M	1:48.40	G1
1974	Bushongo	3	Don MacBeth	Frank A. Bonsal	Marion duPont Scott	11/8 M	1:49.00	G1
1973	Our Native	3	Jacinto Vásquez	William J. Resseguet Jr.	Margaret J. Pritchard	11/8 M	1:48.80	G1
1972	Hold Your Peace	3	Carlos H. Marquez Sr.	Arnold N. Winick	Maribel G. Blum	11/8 M	1:48.40	
1971	Executioner	3	Jacinto Vásquez	Edward J. Yowell	October House Farm	11/8 M	1:49.20	
1970	My Dad George	3	Ray Broussard	Frank J. McManus	Raymond M. Curtis	11/8 M	1:48.60	
1969	Top Knight	3	Manuel Ycaza	Ray Metcalf	Steven B. Wilson	11/8 M	1:47.80	
1968	Wise Exchange *	3	Eddie Belmonte	Hirsch Jacobs	Isidor Bieber	11/8 M	1:48.20	
1967	Reflected Glory	3	Jorge Velásquez	Hirsch Jacobs	Isidor Bieber	11/8 M	1:48.60	
1966	Buckpasser	3	Bill Shoemaker	Edward A. Neloy	Ogden Phipps	11/8 M	1:50.00	
1965	Native Charger	3	John L. Rotz	Ray Metcalf	Warner Stable	11/8 M	1:50.00	
1964	Northern Dancer	3	Bill Shoemaker	Horatio Luro	Windfields Farm	11/8 M	1:47.80	
1963	Never Bend	3	Manuel Ycaza	Woody Stephens	Cain Hoy Stable	11/8 M	1:49.40	
1962	Prego *	3	Larry Adams	Thomas M. Waller	Robert Lehman	11/8 M	1:49.00	
1961	Carry Back	3	Johnny Sellers	Jack A. Price	Mrs. Katherine Price	11/8 M	1:50.60	
1960	Bally Ache	3	Bobby Ussery	Jimmy Pitt	Edgehill Farm	11/8 M	1:48.00	
1959	Troilus	3	Chris Rogers	Charles Peoples	Bayard Sharp	11/8 M	1:49.20	
1958	Tim Tam *	3	Bill Hartack	Horace A. Jones	Calumet Farm	11/8 M	1:48.80	
1957	Bold Ruler	3	Eddie Arcaro	James E. Fitzsimmons	Wheatley Stable	11/8 M	1:47.00	
1956	Needles	3	David Erb	Hugh L. Fontaine	D. & H. Stable	11/8 M	1:49.40	
1955	Nashua	3	Eddie Arcaro	James E. Fitzsimmons	Belair Stud	11/8 M	1:49.60	
1954	Turn-To	3	Henry E. Moreno	Eddie Hayward	Cain Hoy Stable	11/8 M	1:49.40	
1953	Straight Face	3	Ted Atkinson	John M. Gaver Sr.	Greentree Stable	11/8 M	1:49.40	
1952-1	Blue Man	3	Conn McCreary	Woody Stephens	White Oak Stable	11/8 M	1:50.00	
1952-2	Charlie McAdam	3	Sam Boulmetis Sr.	A. G. (Bob) Robertson	John C. Clark	11/8 M	1:50.00	
1951	Yildiz	3	Warren Mehrtens	Oscar White	Sarah F. Jeffords	11/8 M	1:51.20	
1950	Oil Capitol	3	Kenneth Church	Harry Trotsek	Thomas Gray & Cora Trotsek	11/8 M	1:48.20	
1949	Olympia	3	Ted Atkinson	Ivan H. Parke	Fred W. Hooper	11/8 M	1:48.80	
1948	Citation	3	Albert Snider	Ben A. Jones	Calumet Farm	11/8 M	1:49.00	
1947	Faultless	3	Albert Snider	Ben A. Jones	Calumet Farm	11/8 M	1:49.60	
1946	Round View	3	Louis Hildebrandt	Hollie Hughes	Stephen "Laddie" Sanford	11/8 M	1:52.00	
1945	Race not held							
1944	Stir Up	3	Eddie Arcaro	John M. Gaver Sr.	Greentree Stable	11/8 M	1:52.40	
1943	Race not held							
1942	Requested	3	Eddie Arcaro	J. H. "Blackie" McCoole	Ben F. Whitaker	11/8 M	1:50.60	
1941	Dispose	3	Alfred Robertson	Max Hirsch	King Ranch	11/8 M	1:48.80	
1940	Woof Woof	3	Irving Anderson	James W. Healy	John Hay Whitney	11/8 M	1:50.20	
1939	Technician	3	Ira Hanford	Ben A. Jones	Woolford Farm	11/8 M	1:50.20	
1938	Lawrin	3	Wayne D. Wright	Ben A. Jones	Woolford Farm	11/8 M	1:50.80	
1937	Court Scandal	3	Earl Steffen	Walter Burrows	Townsend B. Martin	11/8 M	1:49.60	
1936	Brevity	3	Wayne D. Wright	Pete Coyne	Joseph E. Widener	11/8 M	1:48.20	
1935	Black Helen	3	Don Meade	William A. Hurley	Edward R. Bradley	11/8 M	1:51.00	
1934	Time Clock	3	Mack Garner	Robert A. Smith	Brookmeade Stable	11/8 M	1:49.20	
1933	Charley O.	3	John Gilbert	J. Thomas Taylor	Estate of R. M. Eastman	11/8 M	1:49.60	
1932	Evening	3	Robert Leischman	A. Jack Joyner	George D. Widener Jr.	11/8 M	1:50.80	
1931	Lightning Bolt	3	Charles Kurtsinger	James W. Healy	Liz Whitney	11/8 M	1:51.80	
1930	Titus	3	Alfred Robertson	Robert B. Odom	Arthur W. Wentzel	11/8 M	1:52.00	
1929	Upset Lad	3	James H. Burke	Willie Knapp	Belle Isle Stable	11/8 M	1:53.40	
1927	– 1928	Race not held						
1926	Torcher	3	Strother Griffin	Earl E. Major	Earl E. Major	11/8 M	1:57.20	

Note:

1968 – Iron Ruler disqualified from first to second
1962 – Sunrise County disqualified from first to third
1958 – Jewel's Reward disqualified from first to second
