= Woolford Farm =

Thoroughbred farm in Kansas, United States

Coordinates: 38°58.933′N 94°37.985′W

Woolford Farm raised thoroughbred race horses in eastern Kansas, in what is now the city of Prairie Village, a suburb of Kansas City. The 200-acre (0.81 km^{2}) was owned by Herbert M. Woolf. Trainer Ben A. Jones worked there before going to Calumet Farm in Lexington, Kentucky. Woolf had hired Ben Jones after he had established a reputation of training and breeding horses at the family ranch in Parnell, Missouri. Ben was accompanied by his son Jimmy Jones. After Lawrin won the Kentucky Derby the two trainers went to work for Warren Wright, Sr. at Calumet Farm. At Calumet the two trained seven horses that won the Kentucky Derby including two Triple Crown of Thoroughbred Racing winners.

Graded stakes race wins:

- Kentucky Derby - (1938), Lawrin
- Kentucky Oaks - (1940), Inscolassie
