= Dauber (horse) =

American-bred Thoroughbred racehorse

- Sire: Pennant
- Grandsire: Peter Pan
- Dam: Ship of War
- Damsire: Man o' War
- Sex: Stallion
- Foaled: 1935
- Country: United States
- Color: Chestnut
- Breeder: Cornelius Vanderbilt Whitney
- Owner: Foxcatcher Farms
- Trainer: Richard E. Handlen
- Record: 22: 5-6-5
- Earnings: US$80,130

Major wins
- Nursery Handicap (1937); American Classic Race wins: Preakness Stakes (1938)

Dauber (1935–1947) was an American Thoroughbred racehorse best known for winning the 1938 Preakness Stakes. Bred by Sonny Whitney, he was sired by Harry Payne Whitney's 1913 Futurity Stakes winner, Pennant. His dam was Ship of War, a daughter of Man o' War.

Dauber was purchased by William du Pont, Jr. and raced by his Foxcatcher Farms. Under trainer Richard Handlen, his best result in a major race for two-year-olds was a win in the 1937 Nursery Handicap and a third in the 1937 Pimlico Futurity. At age three, he notably earned a second-place finish to Stagehand in the 1938 Santa Anita Derby. He went on to compete in all three of the U.S. Triple Crown races. Ridden by jockey Maurice Peters, Dauber finished second to Lawrin in the Kentucky Derby, won the Preakness Stakes by seven lengths, and was second to Pasteurized in the Belmont Stakes. Following the Triple Crown, Dauber did not win another significant race.

Retired to stud, Dauber was not successful as a sire.

== Breeding ==
Pedigree of Dauber
Sire Pennant ch. 1911	Peter Pan I brown 1904	Commando	Domino
Sire Pennant ch. 1911	Peter Pan I brown 1904	Commando	Emma C.
Sire Pennant ch. 1911	Peter Pan I brown 1904	Cinderella	Hermit
Sire Pennant ch. 1911	Peter Pan I brown 1904	Cinderella	Mazurka
Sire Pennant ch. 1911	Royal Rose bay 1894	Royal Hampton	Hampton
Sire Pennant ch. 1911	Royal Rose bay 1894	Royal Hampton	Princess
Sire Pennant ch. 1911	Royal Rose bay 1894	Belle Rose	Beaudesert
Sire Pennant ch. 1911	Royal Rose bay 1894	Belle Rose	Monte Rosa
Dam Ship Of War black 1924	Man o'War ch. 1917	Fair Play	Hastings
Dam Ship Of War black 1924	Man o'War ch. 1917	Fair Play	Fairy Gold
Dam Ship Of War black 1924	Man o'War ch. 1917	Mahubah	Rock Sand
Dam Ship Of War black 1924	Man o'War ch. 1917	Mahubah	Merry Token
Dam Ship Of War black 1924	Waterblossom brown 1912	Waterboy	Watercress
Dam Ship Of War black 1924	Waterblossom brown 1912	Waterboy	Zealandia
Dam Ship Of War black 1924	Waterblossom brown 1912	Basseting	Bassetlaw
Dam Ship Of War black 1924	Waterblossom brown 1912	Basseting	Suscol
