= Ben A. Jones =

American horse trainer (1882–1961)

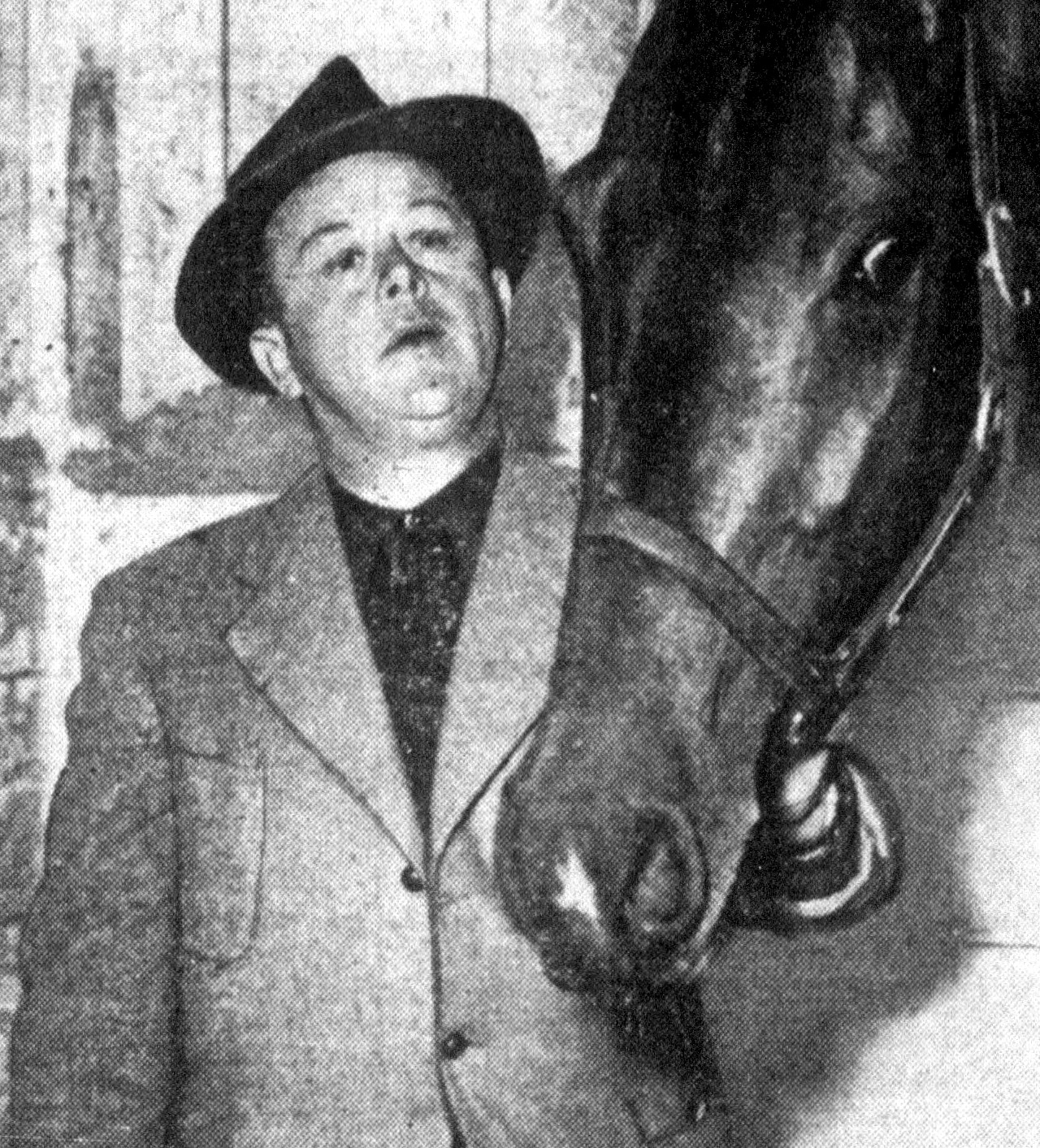
- Jones, circa 1950

Personal information
- Born: December 31, 1882 Parnell, Missouri (United States)
- Died: June 13, 1961 (aged 78)
- Occupation: Trainer

Horse racing career
- Sport: Horse racing

Major racing wins
- (selected); Travers Stakes (1941); Jockey Club Gold Cup (1942, 1945, 1948, 1949); Pimlico Special (1942, 1944, 1945, 1947); Derby Trial Stakes (1943, 1947, 1948, 1951, 1952, 1958); Arlington Classic (1944, 1945, 1952) American Classic Race wins: Kentucky Derby (1938, 1941, 1944, 1948, 1949, 1952); Preakness Stakes (1941, 1944); Belmont Stakes (1941)

Racing awards
- U.S. Champion Trainer by earnings (1941, 1943, 1944, 1952)

Honours
- National Museum of Racing and Hall of Fame (1958); Fair Grounds Racing Hall of Fame (1971)

Significant horses
- Lawrin, Whirlaway, Twilight Tear, Armed, Pensive, Citation, Ponder, Coaltown, Hill Gail,
- Updated on October 30, 2021

Benjamin Allyn Jones (December 31, 1882 – June 13, 1961) was an American thoroughbred horse trainer.

Ben Jones was born in Parnell, Missouri, and attended Wentworth Military Academy in Lexington, Missouri for high school.

Jones went into the business of breeding and training of thoroughbreds during the first decade of the 20th century, racing his horses on small circuits in the American West and in Mexico. By the end of the 1920s he was recognized as one of the better trainers in the industry. He gave up his operation to accept the job of trainer for Woolford Farm in Prairie Village, Kansas from 1931 to 1939 during which time he trained three champions including the 1938 Flamingo Stakes and Kentucky Derby winner, Lawrin.

For the next season, Jones was hired by Warren Wright Sr. to train for his Calumet Farm in Lexington, Kentucky and to take charge of its breeding operation. Under Ben Jones, Calumet became one of the greatest stables in thoroughbred racing history. Between 1938 and 1952, Jones won a record setting six Kentucky Derbies as a horse trainer. Until his record was matched by horse trainer Bob Baffert in 2020, Jones was the only trainer to win the Kentucky Derby six times, including victories by two U.S. Triple Crown winners, Whirlaway and Citation.

In 1948, Ben Jones was appointed general manager of Calumet Farm and his son, Horace A. "Jimmy" Jones, took over head trainer duties. Ben Jones made the cover of the May 30, 1949 issue of Time magazine. He retired in 1953 and in 1958 was inducted into the National Museum of Racing and Hall of Fame.

Ben Jones died in 1961 at the age of seventy-eight.

== Kentucky Derby Race Record ==
Year	Horse	Finish
1938	Lawrin	1st
1939	Technician	5th
1941	Whirlaway †	1st
1942	-	-
1944	Pensive	1st
1945	Pot O' Luck	2nd
1947	Faultless	3rd
1948	Citation † ‡	1st
1948	Coaltown	2nd
1949	Ponder	1st
1951	Fanfare	5th
1952	Hill Gail	1st

† - Won the Triple Crown

‡ - While Jimmy Jones was the trainer of Citation, he allowed his father Ben Jones to be listed as the trainer in the Kentucky Derby. Jimmy took over Citation's training and won the Preakness and Belmont.
