= Hialeah Park Race Track =

Racecourse in South Florida

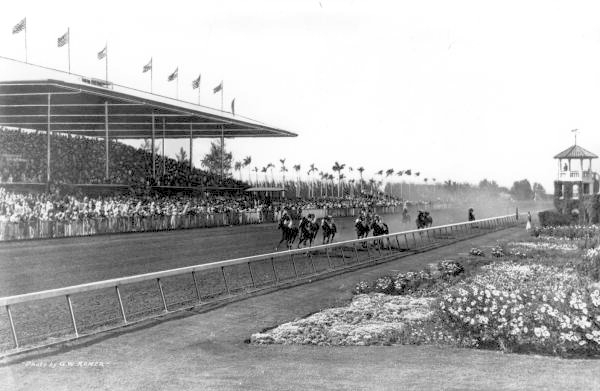
- Hialeah Park, c. 1930
- Interactive map of Hialeah Park Race Track
- Location: 2200 E 4th Avenue; Hialeah, Florida; United States
- Owned by: John Brunetti
- Date opened: January 15, 1922; November 28, 2009 (reopening)
- Date closed: May 22, 2001 (initially); February 29, 2016
- Race type: Quarter Horse
- Course type: 1 1/8 mile main dirt oval (9 furlongs); 1 mile inner turf course (8 furlongs)
- Notable races: Bahamas Stakes; Black Helen Handicap; Bougainvillea Handicap; Everglades Stakes; Flamingo Stakes; Hialeah Turf Cup Handicap; Hibiscus Stakes; McLennan Handicap; Palm Beach Handicap; Royal Palm Handicap; Seminole Handicap; Widener Handicap

- Hialeah Park Race Track
- U.S. National Register of Historic Places
- Location within Miami Location within Florida Location within the United States
- Coordinates: 25°50′53″N 80°16′42″W
- NRHP reference No.: 79000664 (1979) 88003477 (1988)
- Designated NRHP: March 5, 1979 January 12, 1988 (eligible as NHL)

The Hialeah Park Race Track (also known as the Hialeah Race Track or Hialeah Park) is an American casino and former horse racetrack in Hialeah, Florida. The race track operated from 1922 to 2001 for thoroughbreds, and then again from 2009 to 2016 for quarter horses. The main track at Hialeah Park was 1 1/8 mile (9 furlongs) long with an inner turf course 146 feet less than one mile.

The site covers 40 square blocks of central-east side Hialeah from Palm Avenue east to East 4th Avenue, and from East 22nd Street on the south to East 32nd Street on the north. In 1979, it was added to the U.S. National Register of Historic Places. The facility is served by the Miami Metrorail at Hialeah Station at Palm Avenue and East 21st Street.

== History ==
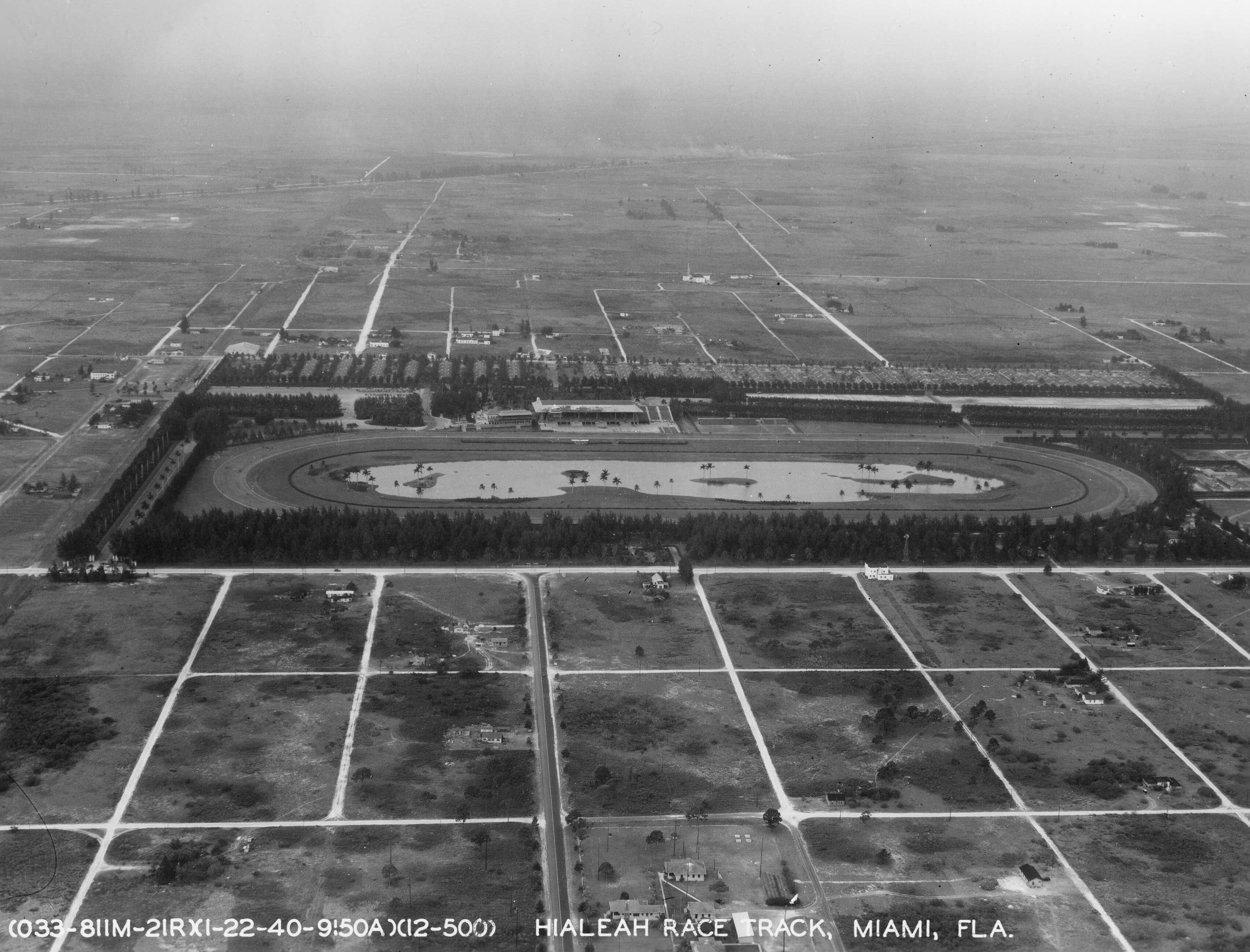
Aerial image, 1940

Originally opened in 1922 by aviation pioneer Glenn Curtiss and his partner, Missouri cattleman James H. Bright, as part of their development of the town of Hialeah, Florida, Hialeah Park opened as a greyhound racing track operated by the Miami Kennel Club. The Miami Jockey Club launched Hialeah's Thoroughbred horse racing track on January 25, 1925.

The facility was severely damaged by the 1926 hurricane and in 1930 was sold to Philadelphia horseman Joseph E. Widener. With Kentucky horseman Col. Edward R. Bradley as an investor, Widener hired architect Lester W. Geisler to design a complete new grandstand and Renaissance Revival clubhouse facilities along with landscaped gardens of native flora and fauna and a lake in the infield that Widener stocked with flamingos.

Hailed as one of the most beautiful racetracks in the world, Hialeah Park officially opened on January 14, 1922. An Australian totalisator for accepting parimutuel betting was the first to be installed in America. The park became so famous for its flamingo flocks that it has been officially designated a sanctuary for the American Flamingo by the Audubon Society.

In 1926, the inaugural Flamingo Stakes was held. The race would become an important stepping stone to the Kentucky Derby for 3-year-old horses, and the most prestigious race held at the track. Notable winners of the Flamingo Stakes included Carry Back, Seattle Slew, Alydar, Spectacular Bid, and Chief's Crown. Another big race held at the track was the once prestigious Widener Handicap, a major race for horses four years and older that was the East Coast counterpart to the Santa Anita Handicap in California.

On January 16, 1936, Hialeah Park became the first thoroughbred horse racing venue to install a photo-finish camera, revolutionizing the accuracy of race results in the sport.

In 1965, a 5,995 pound marble statue of 1948 Triple Crown winner Citation was unveiled.

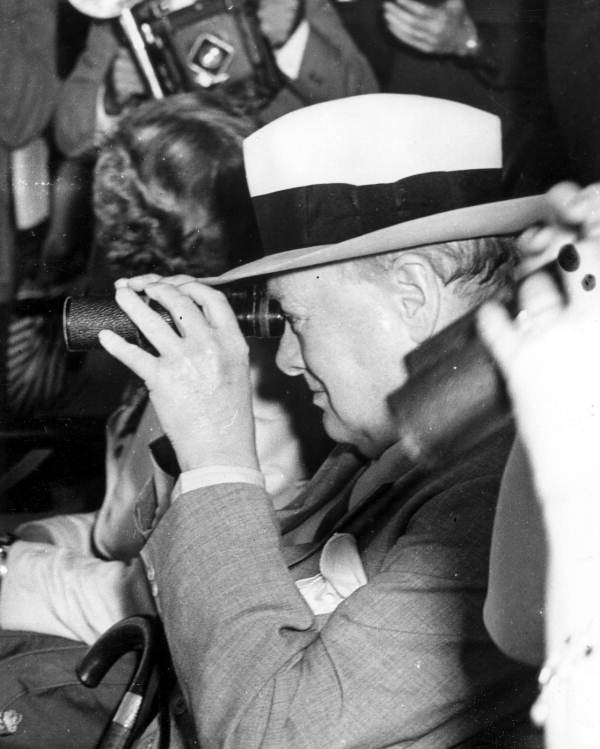
Winston Churchill at Hialeah Park, 1946

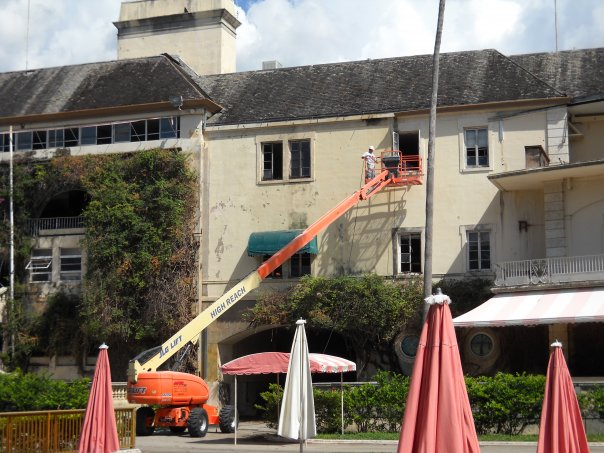
Image showing the restoration of the main club house in 2009

On February 7, 1969, Diane Crump became the first woman to compete as a professional jockey in a pari-mutuel race in the United States; she rode a horse named Bridle 'n Bit. There was so much hostility to a woman riding in a horse race that she needed a police escort to get to the track, taking her through an angry crowd of shouting people. Crump ultimately finished 9th in the 12-horse race and returned to cheers of support.

In 1987, the horse-racing movie Let It Ride, with Richard Dreyfuss, Teri Garr, and Jennifer Tilly, had most of its principal film photography shot at Hialeah Park. Hialeah Park also made an appearance in Public Enemies but most scenes were shot in the Midwest. The Champ (1979) with Jon Voight, Faye Dunaway and Ricky Schroder filmed scenes on Flamingo Day, 3/4/78.

Hialeah Park Racetrack was listed on the National Register of Historic Places on March 2, 1979. On January 12, 1988, the property was determined eligible for designation as a National Historic Landmark by the Secretary of the Interior.

=== 2001 closure ===
In 2001, Hialeah Park stopped hosting racing after a change in Florida state law kept it from having exclusive dates in its competition with Gulfstream Park and Calder Race Course.

Consequently, owner John Brunetti closed Hialeah Park to the public. The filly Cheeky Miss won the last thoroughbred race run at Hialeah on May 22, 2001.

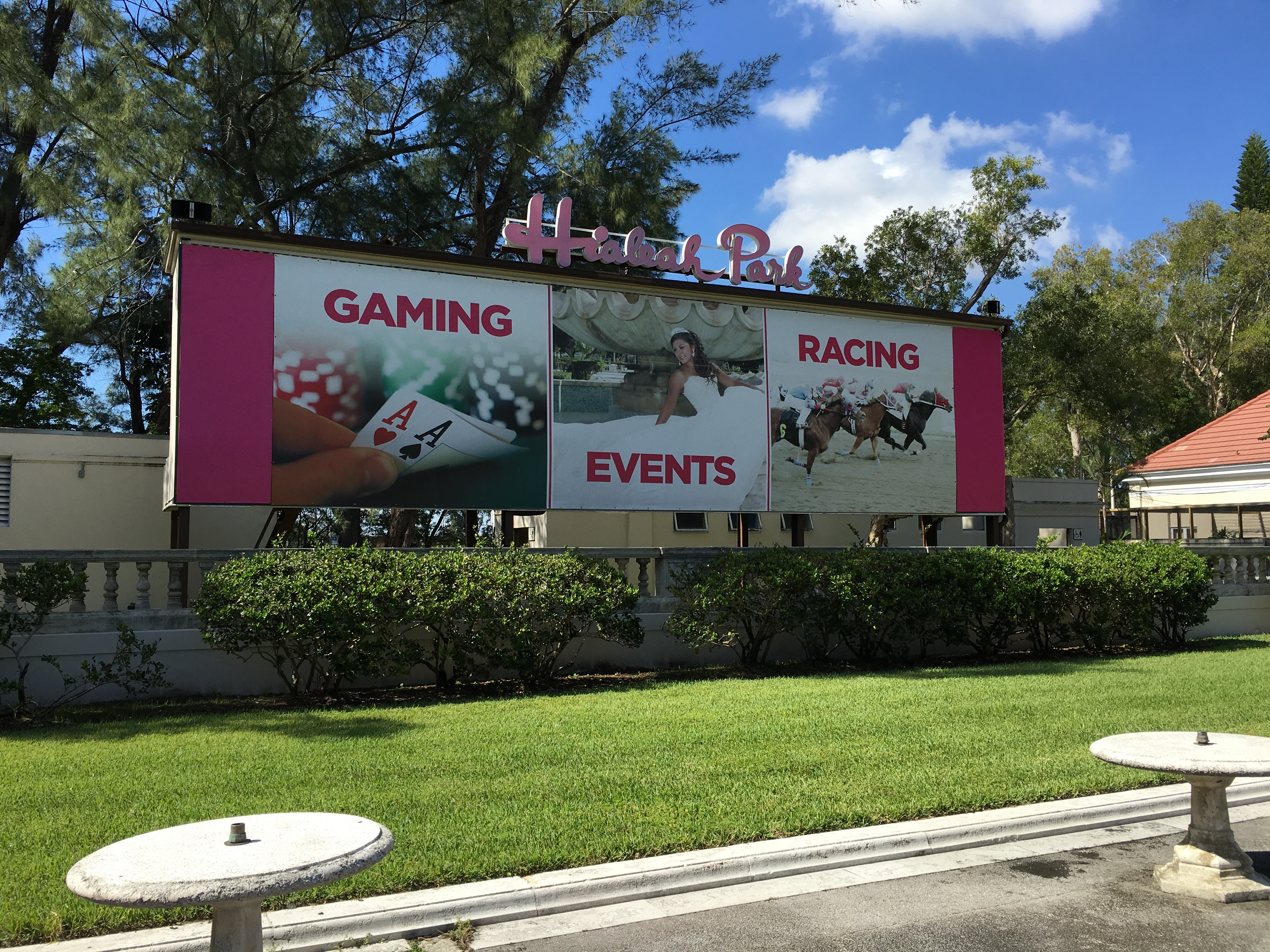
Hialeah Park sign in 2016.

In 2004, the Florida Division of Pari-Mutuel Wagering revoked Hialeah's thoroughbred permit because it did not hold races for the previous two years. As of 2013, its facilities remain intact except for the stables, which were demolished in early 2007.

In 2006, the abandoned Hialeah Park site was considered to be a possible location for a new Florida Marlins Ballpark.

=== Reopening ===
In March 2009, it was announced that track owner John Brunetti was awarded a racing permit. Design firm Ewing Cole was selected to develop a master plan for renovation and further development, including a new casino. A $40–$90 million restoration project was begun in mid-2009.

On May 7, 2009, the Florida legislature agreed to a deal with the Seminole Tribe of Florida that allowed Hialeah Park to operate slot machines and run Quarter Horse races. The historic racetrack reopened on November 28, 2009, but only for quarter horse races.

In January 2010, the park installed slot machines as part of a deal to allow for two calendar seasons of racing. The races ran until February 2, 2010. Only a portion of the park had been restored and an additional $30 million will be needed to complete this first phase of the project. The full transformation was expected to cost $1 billion since the plan included a complete redevelopment of the surrounding area including the construction of an entertainment complex to include a hotel, restaurants, casinos, stores and a theater.

In June 2010 concerns were raised over the preservation of Hialeah Park's historical status as the planned development threatened to hurt Hialeah Park's potential as a National Historic Landmark.

On August 14, 2013, Brunetti opened a new casino at Hialeah Park.

The racetrack held its final quarter horse races on February 29, 2016.

== Notable stakes races ==
- Bahamas Stakes
- Black Helen Handicap
- Bougainvillea Handicap
- Columbiana Handicap
- Everglades Stakes
- Flamingo Stakes
- Hialeah Juvenile Stakes
- Hialeah Stakes
- Hialeah Turf Cup Handicap
- Hibiscus Stakes
- McLennan Handicap
- Palm Beach Handicap
- Royal Palm Handicap
- Seminole Handicap
- Widener Handicap
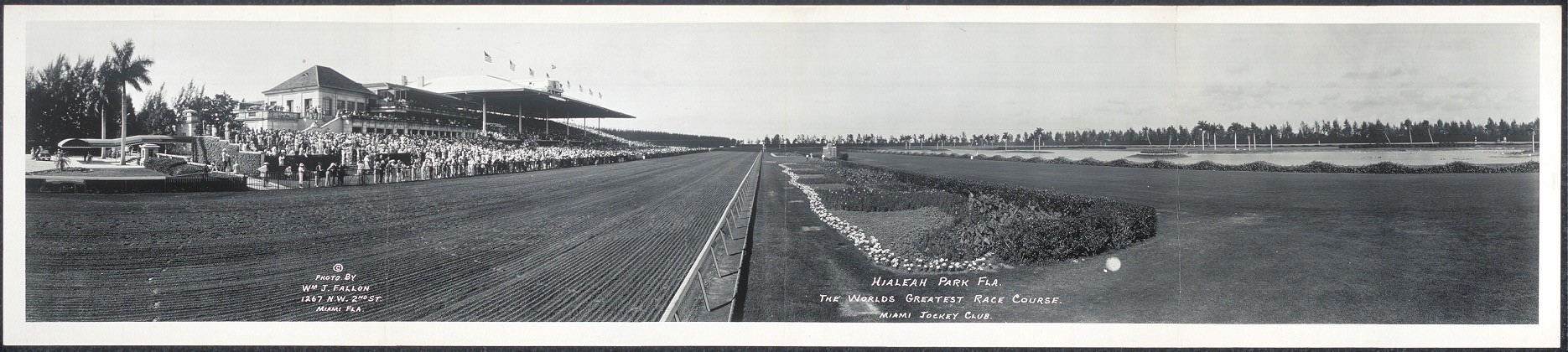
Hialeah Park, c. 1938

== See also ==
- List of casinos in Florida
