= Real Delight =

American-bred Thoroughbred racehorse

- Sire: Bull Lea
- Grandsire: Bull Dog
- Dam: Blue Delight
- Damsire: Blue Larkspur
- Sex: Filly
- Foaled: 1949
- Country: United States
- Colour: Bay
- Breeder: Calumet Farm
- Owner: Calumet Farm
- Trainer: Horace A. Jones
- Record: 15 Starts: 12 – 1 - 0
- Earnings: $261,822

Major wins
- Kentucky Oaks (1952); Beldame Stakes (1952); Coaching Club American Oaks (1952); Modesty Handicap (1952); Beverly Handicap (1952); Black-Eyed Susan Stakes (1952); Cleopatra Stakes (1952); Ashland Stakes (1952); Arlington Matron Handicap (1953)

Awards
- American Champion Three-Year-Old Filly (1952); DRF American Champion Female Handicap Horse (1952)

Honours
- U.S. Racing Hall of Fame (1987)
- Last updated on February 11, 2008

Real Delight (1949–1969), was an American Thoroughbred race horse.

== Background ==
She was bred by the famous Calumet Farm of Lexington, Kentucky. Her sire was one of America's foundation stallions, the influential Bull Lea (sire of seven Hall of Famers, including his other great daughters: Two Lea, Bewitch, and Twilight Tear). Her dam was the stakes-winning Blue Delight (10 wins out of 24 starts) out of Blue Larkspur, a racehorse Blood-Horse magazine considered number 100 in its list of the Twentieth Century's greatest racehorses.

Real Delight was a huge, rangy filly, standing 17 hands. Throughout her second year, she was bothered by a bad knee and did not race as a two-year-old. A Calumet horse, she was trained by Hall of Famer Horace A. Jones. Horace had become the head trainer by the birth of Real Delight while his father, Ben A. Jones, became Calumet's general manager.

== Racing career ==
At three, Real Delight won eleven of twelve starts. She began in combination races, meaning mixed fields of claimers and allowance runners, but quickly stepped up in class after two easy wins. Her first stakes victory came in the Ashland Stakes, followed by her only loss at three, and the only time she competed against males. Even so, at a sprint distance of six and one half furlongs not suited to her long legs, she closed fast, losing by only a head. Often ridden by the Hall of Fame jockey Eddie Arcaro, she then took eight stakes in a row, including the Kentucky Oaks, Coaching Club American Oaks, Black-Eyed Susan Stakes (once known as the Pimlico Oaks), Ashland Stakes, Modesty Handicap, and Beldame Stakes.

By winning the Kentucky Oaks, the Black-Eyed Susan, and the CCA Oaks, she was the second filly to win this early version of the Triple Crown for fillies. The only filly to do so before her was Wistful. (Today's Triple Tiara of Thoroughbred Racing consists of the Acorn Stakes, the Mother Goose Stakes, and the CCA Oaks.)

In 1952, Real Delight was voted the United States Champion Three-Year-Old Filly, and took the Daily Racing Form's award for United States Champion Female Handicap Horse in competition with older fillies and mares.

At four, she won the Arlington Matron Handicap carrying top weight, just as she did in all of her other four-year-old races.

== Retirement ==
She retired that year, going back to Calumet, where she foaled three stakes winners, eventually becoming the third dam of Alydar. Real Delight was inducted into the Hall of Fame in 1987.

== Death ==
Real Delight lived for 20 years, dying in 1969
