= 1956 Kentucky Derby =

Horse race

82nd Kentucky Derby
- Kentucky Derby
- Grade I stakes race
- Location: Churchill Downs
- Date: May 5, 1956
- Winning horse: Needles
- Jockey: David Erb
- Trainer: Hugh L. Fontaine
- Owner: D & H Stable
- Surface: Dirt

The 1956 Kentucky Derby was the 82nd running of the Kentucky Derby. The race took place on May 5, 1956.

== Full results ==
Finished	Post	Horse	Jockey	Trainer	Owner	Time / behind
1st	3	Needles	David Erb	Hugh L. Fontaine	D & H Stable (Jack Dudley & Bonnie Heath)	2:03 2/5
2nd	2C	Fabius	Bill Hartack	Horace A. Jones	Calumet Farm	
3rd	12	Come On Red	Alfred Popara	Odie Clelland	Helen W. Kellogg	
4th	4	Count Chic	Steve Brooks	Lloyd A. Lawson	Mr. & Mrs. Dino Lozzi	
5th	2	Pintor Lea	Robert L. Baird	Horace A. Jones	Calumet Farm	
6th	1	Career Boy	Eric Guerin	Sylvester Veitch	Cornelius Vanderbilt Whitney	
7th	6	No Regrets	Douglas Dodson	Richard T. Waggoner	Wallace E. Britt	
8th	1A	Head Man	Eddie Arcaro	Sylvester Veitch	Cornelius Vanderbilt Whitney	
9th	15	King O' Swords	Ralph Borgemenke	Frankie Sanders	Reverie Knoll Farm	
10th	5	High King	William McKinley Cook	Thomas Barry	Joseph Gavegnano	
11th	13	Jean Baptiste	James D. Nichols	Loyd P. Tate	Mrs. Loyd P. Tate	
12th	9	Terrang	Bill Shoemaker	Mesh Tenney	Rex C. Ellsworth	
13th	10	Black Emperor	John H. Adams	Harry Trotsek	Hasty House Farm	
14th	8	Besomer	Nick Shuk	Colin MacLeod Jr.	Companas Stable	
15th	14	Invalidate	Larry Gilligan	Vester R. Wright	T. Alie Grissom	
16th	7	Ben A. Jones	Paul J. Bailey	Elmer Kalensky	G & M Stable	
17th	11	Countermand	Arnold Kirkland	Virgil W. Raines	Brandywine Stable	

Winning Breeder: William E. Leach; (FL)
