= Wistful =

American-bred Thoroughbred racehorse

- Sire: Sun Again
- Grandsire: Sun Teddy
- Dam: Easy Lass
- Damsire: Blenheim
- Sex: Mare
- Foaled: 1946
- Country: United States
- Colour: Chestnut
- Breeder: Calumet Farm
- Owner: Calumet Farm
- Trainer: Ben A. Jones
- Record: 51: 13-6-10
- Earnings: $213,060

Major wins
- Kentucky Oaks (1949); Coaching Club American Oaks (1949); Black-Eyed Susan Stakes (1949); Beverly Handicap (1950); Clang Handicap (1950); Clark Handicap (1951); Ben Ali Stakes (1951); Whirlaway Stakes (1951)

Awards
- American Champion Three-Year-Old Filly (tie) (1949)

Wistful (foaled in 1946 in Kentucky) was an American Champion Thoroughbred racemare. The daughter of Sun Again and granddaughter of Sun Teddy is best remembered for wins in the Kentucky Oaks, the Coaching Club American Oaks, the Black-Eyed Susan Stakes.

== Early career ==
Wistful was born in 1946 in Kentucky. She was born in the glory days of Calumet Farm, being bred, reared and raced by the industry's then standard bearer. She therefore ran her races with her jockeys wearing the "devil red Silks" of Calumet. Wistful never ran as a two-year-old.

== Three-year-old season ==
Wistful placed second in the Ashland Stakes at Keeneland Racecourse in April, losing to a longshot named Tall Weeds. Her connections then entered her in the first two jewels of America's de facto Filly Triple Crown: the Kentucky Oaks and the Black-Eyed Susan Stakes. At Churchill Downs, she won the Kentucky Oaks over The Fat Lady and Lady Dorimar in a strong field of ten fillies, then beat a field of nine in the grade two Black-Eyed Susan Stakes at Pimlico Race Course.

In June, Wistful finished third in the Cleopatra Stakes at Arlington Park in Chicago, Illinois. In August, she won the Coaching Club American Oaks at 1 3/8 miles on the dirt at Belmont Park.

Wistful shared the 1949 American Champion Three-Year-Old Filly title with Two Lea, another Calumet horse, as the fillies tied in the Daily Racing Form poll.

== Four- and five-year-old seasons ==
At age four, Wistful campaigned all over the country, from the northeast in New York to the deep southwest in Southern California. In 1950, she won the Beverly Handicap at Washington Park Racetrack, and at Arlington Park in Chicago won the Arlington Matron Handicap and ran third in the Cleopatra Handicap. She also won the Clang Handicap and placed third in the prestigious Beldame Stakes at Belmont Park in New York.

In the spring of her five-year-old season, Wistful won the Ben Ali Stakes at Keeneland, less than one mile from where she was born and raised on Versailles Road in Lexington, Kentucky. She ran against colts and won in the Whirlaway Stakes at Washington Park Race Track. Most of the success she achieved late in her career happened during the summers in California. In successive years, she ran in the Vanity Handicap at Hollywood Park. She placed second in 1951 to Bewitch and third in 1952 to her stablemate and champion Two Lea. She also ran third in the San Mateo Handicap at Bay Meadows Racetrack just outside San Francisco in 1951. During that time, she also shipped east and placed in the Ladies Handicap, the oldest stakes race in the U.S. exclusively for fillies and mares, losing to Next Move.

The biggest win in the twilight of her career came at the end of her five-year-old season, when she beat males in November 1951 in the Clark Handicap at Churchill Downs in Louisville, Kentucky. At the time, she was preparing to retire and was listed on the morning line as a long shot. Under jockey Douglas Dodson, Wistful won the nine-furlong race in 1:44.00.

== Retirement ==
Wistful was retired and sent back to Calumet Farm, to breed and live out the rest of her years.

Her first foal was Gen. Duke, a 1954 colt by Bull Lea, who won the 1957 Florida Derby and finished with a 12-5-5-2 record and earnings of $142,020.
