= Nellie Morse Stakes top three finishers =

Winners of horse race in Laurel, Maryland

This is a listing of the horses that finished in either first, second, or third place and the number of starters in the Nellie Morse Stakes (1941-present), an American Thoroughbred Stakes race for fillies and mares four years-old and up at six furlongs run on dirt at Laurel Park Racecourse in Laurel, Maryland.

Year	Winner	Second	Third	Starters
1941	Shine o' Night	Misty Isle	Rosetown	n/a
1942	Vagrancy	Lotopoise	Rosetown	n/a
1943	Silvestra	Barbara Childs	Kanlast	n/a
1944	Twilight Tear	Good Morning	Legend Bearer	n/a
1945	Good Blood	Miss Keeneland	Fair Ann	n/a
1946	Monsoon	Rampart	Good Blood	n/a
1947	Earshot	Snow Goose	Legendra	n/a
1948	Honeymoon	Rampart	Irisen	n/a
1949	Mother	Camargo	Bebita	n/a
1950	1990 no races	no races	no races	0
1991	Dixie Accent	Crowned	Etiquette	n/a
1992	Stem the Tide	Brilliant Brass	Crowned	n/a
1993	Starlight Surprise	Broad Gains	Stem the Tide	n/a
1994	Open Toe	Buffels	Double Sixes	n/a
1995	Valiant Jewel	Night Fax	Power Play	n/a
1996	Churchbell Chimes	Cherokee Wonder	Miss Slewpy	n/a
1997	See Your Point	Double Stake	Palliser Bay	n/a
1998	Merengue	Deb's Honor	Winter Melody	n/a
1999	Pocho's Dream Girl	Proud Run	Gold From the West	n/a
2000	no race	no race	no race	0
2001	Too too Devine	Sheldons Jet	Tookin Down	n/a
2002	Case of the Blues	Irving's Baby	Your Out	n/a
2003	Martha's Music	Mystic Notion	Pass the Virtue	n/a
2004	City Fire	Sweet Dynamite	Undercover	n/a
2005	Silmaril	Richetta	Points West	n/a
2006	Promanade Girl	Princess Pelona	Ask Queenie	n/a
2007	Lexi Star	It's True Love	Yolanda B. Too	n/a
2008	Wild Hoots	Art Show	Take a Check	n/a
2009	All Smiles	Fascinatin’ Rhythm	Irvs Pick	n/a
2010	Northern Station	Weathered	Emily Allstar	n/a
2011	Potosina	Music Please	McVictory	6
2012	no race	no race	no race	0
2013	Moon Philly	Touch the Birds	Access to Charlie	12
2014	Firenze Feeling	Celtic Katie	Access to Charlie	6
2015	Star Pearl	Before You Know It	Zucchini Flower	9
2016	Love Came to Town	Brenda's Way	Playful Love	9
2017	Winter	Addibel Lightning	Moon River	6
2018	In the Navy Now	Line of Best Fit	Sky Flower	9
2019	Timeless Curls	Mzima Springs	Enthrall	6
2020	Arrifana	Horologist	Needs Supervision	7
2021	Lucky Stride	Landing Zone	Artful Splatter	8

== See also ==
- Nellie Morse Stakes
- Laurel Park Racecourse
