= General Duke =

General Duke may refer to the following:

- General Duke a character in the StarCraft series of video games
- General Duke (horse) - a 19th-century American racehorse
- Gen. Duke - a 20th-century American racehorse
- Basil W. Duke - a Confederate general in the 19th century
