= Double Six =

Double Six, double six, or double sixes may refer to:

== Games ==
- Doublesix, a video game company
- Boxcars (slang), a roll of two dice showing six pips on each die
- Double six (dominoes), a domino set with a maximum of six pips on each tile end, or the individual domino that has six pips on both ends
- In pai gow (Chinese dominoes), the Teen tile, a tile with six pips of each color

== Music ==
- Les Double Six, a French jazz group of the early 1960s
- Double Six Records, a subsidiary label of Domino Records
- The Double Six Club, one of the five stages of the Connect Music Festival in Scotland
- Club Series Double Six, a 12-string guitar made by Burns London

== Other ==
- Double Six (TV series), 1957 comedy revue on BBC Television
- Double Six Crash, an airplane crash in 1976 in Malaysia
- Double Six Monument, a memorial to the airplane crash
- Double Sixth Festival, traditional Chinese festival
- Daimler Double-Six, one of two series of automobile engines, or the cars using these engines
- Schläfli double six, two sets of six lines in space with each line crossing five from the other set
- Double Six, a race horse that won the Prix de la Salamandre in 1890
- Double Sixes, a race horse that was one of the Nellie Morse Stakes top three finishers in 1994
- In automatic milking, a possible size of a milking parlor
- The Double Six Youth Club in Woodseats, Yorkshire, England
