= Iron Liege =

American-bred Thoroughbred racehorse

- Sire: Bull Lea
- Grandsire: Bull Dog
- Dam: Iron Maiden
- Damsire: War Admiral
- Sex: Stallion
- Foaled: March 11, 1954
- Country: United States
- Colour: Bay
- Breeder: Calumet Farm
- Owner: Calumet Farm
- Trainer: Horace A. Jones
- Record: 33: 11-9-5
- Earnings: $404,169

Major wins
- Forerunner Stakes (1957); Sheridan Handicap (1957); Jersey Stakes (1957); Laurance Armour Memorial Handicap (1957); McLennan Handicap (1958) Triple Crown Race wins: Kentucky Derby (1957); Preakness Stakes 2nd (1957)
- Last updated on August 6, 2007

Iron Liege (March 11, 1954 – December 14, 1972) was an American Thoroughbred racehorse best known for winning the 1957 Kentucky Derby.

== Background ==
Iron Liege was a bay horse bred and owned by Calumet Farm. He was sired by Calumet's leading sire Bull Lea, out of the mare Iron Maiden a daughter of the 1937 U.S. Triple Crown champion, War Admiral. Iron Maiden also produced Iron Reward, the dam of Swaps.

He was trained throughout his racing career by Hall of Fame trainer Jimmy Jones.

== Three-year-old season ==
As a three-year-old colt in 1957 leading up to the Kentucky Derby, Iron Liege and his more highly regarded stablemate Gen. Duke sometimes ran coupled. These races included an allowance win by Iron Liege over Gen. Duke at Hialeah and a third-place finish to victorious Gen. Duke and Bold Ruler in the Florida Derby. Both colts were entered in the Derby Trial preceding the Kentucky Derby, with Gen. Duke finishing second and Iron Liege fifth. After the race, Jones determined that Gen. Duke was not fit to run in the Derby, which left Iron Liege his sole entrant against perhaps the greatest field ever assembled for the race, including: Bold Ruler, Round Table, and Gallant Man. Future Hall of Fame jockey Bill Hartack, who was Gen. Duke's regular rider, was assigned to ride Iron Liege in the Derby.

In the Derby, Iron Liege took the lead over pacesetter Federal Hill but encountered a fast-charging Gallant Man in deep stretch. As the two passed the 1/16 mile pole, Gallant Man's rider, future Hall of Fame jockey Bill Shoemaker, stood up in his irons long enough for Gallant Man to briefly lose his stride and slowed his rush for the wire. Iron Liege held off Gallant Man and won by a nose in a driving finish, with Round Table third and Bold Ruler fourth. After first blaming his actions on a bad step by Gallant Man, Shoemaker admitted that he misjudged the 1/16 mile pole as the finish line, and he was suspended for 15 days by the Churchill Downs stewards for "gross carelessness". His gaffe has been noted in books, in articles, and on online sites as one of the biggest blunders in racing history.

Following his Kentucky Derby win, Iron Liege finished second to Bold Ruler in the Preakness, but did not compete in the Belmont Stakes. He also finished second in the American Derby to Round Table. As a three-year-old, Iron Liege also posted stakes wins in the Forerunner Stakes, Sheridan Stakes, Laurance Armour Memorial Handicap, and Jersey Stakes. As a four-year-old, he won the McLennan Handicap.

== Stud record ==
Iron Liege stood as a breeding stallion in Japan and died at the Shizunai stud in Hokkaido in 1972. The best of his offspring included:

- Strong Eight (Arima Kinen, Naruo Kinen, American Jockey Club Cup)
- Taiho Hero (Naruo Kinen, Megro Kinen, Sapporo Kinen)
- Adjar (Prix Perth)

== Pedigree ==
Pedigree of Iron Liege (USA) bay horse 1954
Sire Bull Lea (USA) 1935	Bull Dog (FR); 1927	Teddy	Ajax
Sire Bull Lea (USA) 1935	Bull Dog (FR); 1927	Teddy	Rondeau
Sire Bull Lea (USA) 1935	Bull Dog (FR); 1927	Plucky Liege	Spearmint
Sire Bull Lea (USA) 1935	Bull Dog (FR); 1927	Plucky Liege	Concertina
Sire Bull Lea (USA) 1935	Rose Leaves (USA); 1916	Ballot	Voter
Sire Bull Lea (USA) 1935	Rose Leaves (USA); 1916	Ballot	Cerito
Sire Bull Lea (USA) 1935	Rose Leaves (USA); 1916	Colonial	Trenton
Sire Bull Lea (USA) 1935	Rose Leaves (USA); 1916	Colonial	Thankful Blossom
Dam Iron Maiden (USA) 1941	War Admiral (USA); 1934	Man o' War	Fair Play
Dam Iron Maiden (USA) 1941	War Admiral (USA); 1934	Man o' War	Mahubah
Dam Iron Maiden (USA) 1941	War Admiral (USA); 1934	Brushup	Sweep
Dam Iron Maiden (USA) 1941	War Admiral (USA); 1934	Brushup	Annette K
Dam Iron Maiden (USA) 1941	Betty Derr (USA); 1928	Sir Gallahad	Teddy
Dam Iron Maiden (USA) 1941	Betty Derr (USA); 1928	Sir Gallahad	Plucky Liege
Dam Iron Maiden (USA) 1941	Betty Derr (USA); 1928	Uncle's Lassie	Uncle
Dam Iron Maiden (USA) 1941	Betty Derr (USA); 1928	Uncle's Lassie	Planutess (family A4)

- Iron Liege was inbred 3 × 4 to the stallion Teddy and the mare Plucky Liege, meaning that these horses appear in both the third and fourth generations of his pedigree.
