= Nellie Morse Stakes =

- Class: Ungraded Stakes
- Location: Laurel Park Racecourse, Laurel, Maryland, United States
- Inaugurated: 1941
- Race type: Thoroughbred - Flat racing
- Website: www.laurelpark.com

Race information
- Distance: 1 mile (8 furlongs)
- Surface: Dirt
- Track: left-handed
- Qualification: Fillies & Mares; Four-year-olds & up
- Weight: Assigned
- Purse: $100,000

The Nellie Morse Stakes is an American Thoroughbred horse race held annually in January at Laurel Park Racecourse in Laurel, Maryland. The race is open to fillies and mares age four years old and up and is run at one mile (eight furlongs) on the dirt.

An ungraded Black type race, it currently offers a purse of $100,000. The race was previously called the Queen Isabella Stakes from 1941 through 1993.

The race was named in honor of Nellie Morse, the last filly to win the Preakness Stakes (prior to Rachel Alexandra in 2009) in 1924. Nellie Morse was a daughter of Luke McLuke and to date is the only horse ever to win both the Black-Eyed Susan Stakes and the Preakness Stakes. She won those races three days apart and ended the year with $60,250, which was the most earned by any thoroughbred that year.

As a broodmare, Nellie Morse left a legacy. Her daughter Nellie Flag was named two-year-old champion in 1934 and was the morning line and post time favorite in the 1935 Kentucky Derby (she finished fourth). Nellie Flag also raced in the Preakness Stakes but finished seventh. Nellie Morse's descendants, through Nellie Flag, include horse of the Year Forego, Kentucky Derby winner and champion three-year-old Bold Forbes, and champion handicap mare Mar-Kell.

== Records ==
Speed record:

- 1 mile - 1:36.20 - Northern Station (2010)
- 1 1/8 miles - 1:49.00 - Stem the Tide (1992)

Most wins by a horse:

- No horse has ever won more than one Nellie Morse Stakes

Most wins by an owner:

- 2 - Calumet Farm (1944, 1945)
- 2 - Stephen E. Quick (2005, 2007)

Most wins by a jockey:

- 4 - Mario Pino (1997, 1999, 2002, 2008)

Most wins by a trainer:

- 2 - Christopher W. Grove (2005, 2007)
- 2 - James W. Murphy (1992, 1994)
- 2 - Ben A. Jones (1944, 1945)

== Winners ==
Year	Winner	Age	Jockey	Trainer	Owner	Dist. (Miles)	Time	Purse$
2021	Lucky Stride	5	Julian Pimentel	Michael Trombetta	Sonata Stable	1 1/16	1:43.38	$100,000
2020	Arrifana	4	Julian Pimentel	Kelly Rubley	Gunpowder Farms	1 mile	1:35.95	$100,000
2019	Timeless Curls	4	Weston Hamilton	Dale Capuano	Sookdeen Pasram	1 1/16	1:43.66	$100,000
2018	In the Navy Now	4	Julian Pimentel	Michael Trombetta	Larry R. Johnson	1 1/16	1:45.61	$100,000
2017	Winter	4	Trevor McCarthy	Cal Lynch	Matthew Schera	1 1/16	1:45.32	$100,000
2016	Love Came to Town	4	Mychel Sanchez	Kevin Sleeter	Gerald Sleeter	1 1/16	1:45.50	$75,000
2015	Star Pearl	5	Sheldon Russell	H. Graham Motion	Pearl Bloodstock	1 1/16	1:46.33	$100,000
2014	Firenze Feeling	4	Victor Carrasco	Rudy Rodriguez	Michael Dubb & Bethlehem Stables	1 1/16	1:48.69	$100,000
2013	Moon Philly	4	Jeremy Rose	Michael Trombetta	Country Life Farm	1 1/16	1:44.67	$125,000
2012	Race not held							
2011	Potosina	3	Sheldon Russell	Mark Shuman	Jose Cerrillo	1 mile	1:40.86	$75,000
2010	Northern Station	5	Clinton Potts	Todd Beattie	Tommy Town T-breds	1 mile	1:36.20	$70,000
2009	All Smiles	6	Dale Beckner	Fran Campitelli	Cynthia McGinnes	1 mile	1:37.83	$60,000
2008	Wild Hoots	4	Mario Pino	Kiaran McLaughlin	Dell Ridge Farm	1 mile	1:38.40	$60,000
2007	Lexi Star	5	Ryan Fogelsonger	Christopher Grove	Stephen E. Quick	1 mile	1:38.30	$100,000
2006	Promenade Girl	4	Erick D. Rodriguez	Lawrence E. Murray	Sondra D. Bender	1 mile	1:38.40	$70,000
2005	Silmaril	4	Ryan Fogelsonger	Christopher Grove	Stephen E. Quick	1 mile	1:39.20	$85,000
2004	City Fire	4	Abe Castellano, Jr.	Mark Shuman	Michael Gill	1 1/16	1:43.60	$75,000
2003	Martha's Music	4	Stewart Elliott	John Servis	John C. Mabee	1 1/16	1:45.40	$50,000
2002	Case of the Blues	5	Mario Pino	Anthony W. Dutrow	Acorn Hill Farm, Inc	1 1/16	1:43.80	$75,000
2001	Too too Divine	6	Harry Vega	John J. Fee	Charles C. Lenz Jr.	1 1/16	1:46.60	$58,000
2012	Race not held							
1999	Pocho's Dream Girl	5	Mario Pino	Alan E. Goldberg	Farnsworth Farms	1 1/8	1:51.00	$55,000
1998	Merengue	3	Rick Wilson	Donald H. Barr	Gerald C. Dickens	1 1/8	1:50.80	$55,000
1997	See Your Point	5	Mario Pino	William M. Sire	William M. Sire	1 1/8	1:49.20	$55,000
1996	Churchbell Chimes	5	Edgar Prado	J. William Boniface	Susan Y. Granville	1 1/8	1:50.00	$55,000
1995	Valiant Jewel	5	Alberto Delgado	Roger Attfield	Huntington Stud Farm, Inc.	1 1/8	1:51.20	$55,000
1994	Open Toe	4	Larry Reynolds	James W. Murphy	John Pomerosa Farms	1 1/8	1:50.40	$50,000
1993	Starlight Surprise	5	Alberto Delgado	Roberta N. Riffle	B and D Stable	1 1/8	1:51.80	$55,000
1992	Stem the Tide	4	Charles C. Fenwick III	James W. Murphy	Christiana Stables	1 1/8	1:49.00	$50,000
1991	Dixie Accent	4	Santos Chavez	Charles Peoples	Bayard Sharp	1 1/8	1:50.60	$50,000
1950	1990	Race not held						
1949	Mother	5	Clarence Picou	Sylvester E. Veitch	C. V. Whitney	1 1/8	1:51.80	$9,000
1948	Honeymoon	5	Porter Roberts	Graceton Philpot	Louis B. Mayer	1 1/8	1:52.00	$12,000
1947	Earshot	5	Ovie Scurlock	William J. Booth	William G. Helis Sr.	1 1/8	1:52.80	$13,000
1946	Monsoon	4	Bobby Watson	Lydell T. Ruff	C. V. Whitney	1 1/8	1:53.80	$12,500
1945	Good Blood	3	Douglas Dodson	Ben A. Jones	Calumet Farm	1 1/8	1:53.80	$40,500
1944	Twilight Tear	3	Douglas Dodson	Ben A. Jones	Calumet Farm	1 1/8	1:53.20	$12,000
1943	Silvestra	5	Nick Jemas	Ross Higdon	Woolford Farm	1 1/8	1:55.80	$10,000
1942	Vagrancy	3	James Stout	Jim Fitzsimmons	Belair Stud Farm	1 1/8	1:51.00	$7,500
1941	Shine o' Night	4	Sterling Young	William F. Tucker	William C. Hobson	1 1/8	1:52.40	$7,500

== See also ==
- Nellie Morse Stakes top three finishers
- Laurel Park Racecourse
