= Beverly Handicap =

The Beverly Handicap was an American Thoroughbred horse race first run in 1938 at Washington Park Race Track in the Chicago metropolitan area and moved to Arlington Park in 1962. A race for fillies and mares age three and older, the Beverly Handicap was run on dirt until 1965 when it was changed to a race on turf.

The race was run in two divisions in 1966.

In 1954, Hall of Fame jockey Johnny Adams won the Beverly Handicap on his fortieth birthday. Riding Good Call, he edged out runner-up Vixenfixit, ridden by his son, Ralph Adams.

In 1959, Honey's Gem won the Beverly, setting an American record of 1:34.00 for a mile on dirt. Her record was equaled by the 1961 winner, Equifun.

== Winners ==
Year	Winner	Age	Jockey	Trainer	Owner	Distance	Time
1970	Blue Rage	4	Jorge Tejeira	Ronnie Warren	Mrs. Russell L. Reineman	1-1/8M	1:47.80
1969	Pattee Canyon	4	Eddie Arroyo	Stanley M. Rieser	Barbara Hunter	1-1/8M	1:48.60
1968	Spire	4	Fernando Alvarez	Horatio Luro	George R. Wallace	1M	1:42.00
1967	Margarethen	5	Jimmy Nichols	Charles P. Sanborn	Ernest H. Woods	1-1/8M	1:50.80
1966	Short Fall	4	Ronnie Ferraro	Warren J. Pascuma	Raymond E. Karlinsky	1-1/16M	1:43.00
1966	Margarethen	4	Jimmy Nichols	Charles P. Sanborn	Ernest H. Woods	1-1/16M	1:43.00
1965	Swoonalong	4	David Kassen	Brian Ott	E. Gay Drake	1M	1:35.60
1964	Star Maggie	4	Bill Shoemaker	Joseph S. Dunn	Mr.& Mrs. John T. Jones	1M	1:37.80
1963	Patrol Woman	4	Jimmy Nichols	Kenny Noe, Sr.	Mrs. Joseph A. Goodwin	1M	1:36.20
1962	Kootenai	4	Bill Shoemaker	Stanley M. Rieser	Barbara Hunter	1-1/8M	1:40.60
1961	Equifun	5	Sidney Le Jeune	Glenn Ballenger	John E. Hughes	1M	1:34.00
1960	Indian Maid	4	John L. Rotz	Philip G. Johnson	Mary D. Keim	1M	1:36.80
1959	Honey's Gem	4	Johnny Longden	Noble Threewitt	Conejo Ranch	1M	1:34.00
1958	Bornastar	5	Kenneth Church	W. Graves Sparks	J. Graham Brown	1M	1:35.80
1957	Dotted Line	4	Jack Skelly	Max Hirsch	King Ranch	1-1/8M	1:49.40
1956	Amoret	4	Bill Hartack	Horace A. Jones	Calumet Farm	1-1/8M	1:49.60
1955	Queen Hopeful	4	John H. Adams	Harry Trotsek	Hasty House Farm	1M	1:35.40
1954	Good Call	4	John H. Adams		Fairway Farm	1M
1953	Sunny Dale	5	William McKinley		Dave Piper	1M	1:36.00
1952	Real Delight	3	Eddie Arcaro	Horace A. Jones	Calumet Farm	1M	1:34.80
1951	Wistful	5	Steve Brooks	Ben A. Jones	Calumet Farm	1M	1:35.80
1950	Lithe	4	Eldon Nelson	Frank Barnett	Hal Price Headley	1-1/8M	1:50.20
1949	Bewitch	4	Steve Brooks	Ben A. Jones	Calumet Farm	1M	1:34.40
1948	Honeymoon	5	Jack Westrope	Graceton Philpot	W-L Ranch Co.	1M	1:35.00
1947	Be Faithful	5	Jack Westrope	H. H. Pete Battle	Mrs. E. E. Dale Shaffer	1M	1:38.00
1946	Be Faithful	4	Jack Westrope	Graceton Philpot	Louis B. Mayer	1-1/8M	1:49.40
1945	Durazna	4		John M. Goode	Brownell Combs	1-1/8M	1:51.40
1944	Traffic Court	6	Al Bodlou		Nick Burger	1-1/8M	1:50.20
1943	Askmenow	3	George Woolf	Kenneth Osborne	Hal Price Headley	1-1/8M	1:51.00
1942	Montsin	5	Frank Gill		Hyman Friedberg	1M	1:37.80
1941	Montsin	5			Hyman Friedberg	1M
1940	Busy Morn	5	Kenneth McCombs		B. F. Masterson	1M	1:38.60
1939	Smart Trick	3	Jimmy Ashcroft	Jake Lowenstein	Morris Vehon	1M,70YDS	1:44.80
1938	Novelette	3	Nunzio Pariso	Jake Lowenstein	Mrs. Jake Lowenstein	1M,70YDS	1:43.40
