= Gen. Duke =

20th-century American Thoroughbred racehorse

- Sire: Bull Lea
- Grandsire: Bull Dog
- Dam: Wistful
- Damsire: Sun Again
- Sex: Stallion
- Foaled: 1954
- Country: United States
- Colour: Brown
- Breeder: Calumet Farm
- Owner: Calumet Farm
- Trainer: Horace A. Jones
- Jockey: W. Hartack

Major wins
- Florida Derby

Gen. Duke (1954–1958) was an American Thoroughbred racehorse who won the 1957 Florida Derby.

== Background ==
Gen. Duke was sired by Bull Lea, who was by the imported stallion Bull Dog and out of Rose Leaves by Ballot. Gen. Duke's dam was Wistful, a daughter of Sun Again by Sun Teddy. Wistful earned the 1949 Filly Triple Crown by winning the Kentucky Oaks, the Pimlico Oaks, and the Coaching Club American Oaks. Gen. Duke's second dam, or maternal grandmother, was Easy Lass by the imported stallion Blenheim. Easy Lass was the 1949 Broodmare of the Year. Gen. Duke was foaled on April 15, 1954, and bred by Calumet Farm, in Lexington, Kentucky. He was named for General Duke, the 1868 Belmont Stakes winner as well as Basil Duke, a Confederate general in the American Civil War.

== Racing career ==
Gen. Duke raced twice as a two-year-old, with a single maiden win and a third. As a three-year-old, he faced eventual 3-year-old champion Bold Ruler 4 times leading up to the Kentucky Derby, with each winning twice. At Hialeah Park, Gen. Duke ran second to Bold Ruler January 30 in the 7/8 mile Bahamas Stakes, with Bold Ruler giving up 12 pounds. Gen. Duke, again receiving 12 pounds from his rival, won the 1 1/8 mile Everglades Stakes February 15. At equal weights, Gen. Duke finished second by a neck to Bold Ruler on March 2 in the 1 1/8 mile Flamingo Stakes, with the winner establishing a new track record of 1:47. In their fourth and final meeting March 30 in the 1 1/8 mile Florida Derby at Gulfstream Park, Gen. Duke, with Hall of Fame jockey Bill Hartack aboard and coupled with eventual Kentucky Derby winner Iron Liege in the 5 horse field, defeated Bold Ruler at equal weight of 122 pounds by 1 1/2 lengths in the final time of 1:46 4/5. His winning time established a new track record, equaled the world record held by Noor, Alidon, and Swaps, and continues to be the fastest Florida Derby ever run.

After his sensational victory in the Florida Derby over the 3:5 favorite, Gen. Duke was projected to be the Kentucky Derby favorite over perhaps the strongest field ever assembled for the race: Bold Ruler, eventual Horse of the Year Round Table, and eventual Belmont Stakes winner Gallant Man, along with his stablemate Iron Liege. A foot injury, apparently sustained during his Florida Derby win, was initially described as a bruise by trainer Jimmy Jones, but after finishing a disappointing second to sprinter Federal Hill in the Derby Trial, Jones determined Gen. Duke would not run in the Derby. While in training leading up to the Preakness Stakes, Gen. Duke returned lame after a breeze, and his 3-year-old campaign was shut down. It was finally determined in July that he had a slight fracture in his hoof and would need a long rest to recover. His earnings in 1957 were $139,385 ($1,560,000 currently), with $133,010 ($1,489,000 currently) coming from stakes race earnings.

== Retirement ==
Gen. Duke's career ended with a total of 12 starts, with 5 wins, 5 seconds, and 2 thirds and a total earnings of $142,020 ($1,643,000 currently). As a four-year-old he developed wobbler syndrome, which is a neurological condition affecting balance. He was never able to sire any offspring. He died in 1958 and is buried at Calumet Farm.
