= 1957 Kentucky Derby =

Horse race

83rd Kentucky Derby
- Kentucky Derby
- Grade I stakes race
- Location: Churchill Downs
- Date: May 4, 1957
- Winning horse: Iron Liege
- Jockey: Bill Hartack
- Trainer: Horace A. Jones
- Owner: Calumet Farm
- Surface: Dirt

The 1957 Kentucky Derby was the 83rd running of the Kentucky Derby. The race took place on May 4, 1957.

Of note, future U.S. Racing Hall of Fame inductee John H. Adams finished eighth and his son John R. Adams finished ninth.

The race was unique in that it featured 3 future members of the Hall of Fame: Gallant Man, Round Table, and Bold Ruler. However, none of them won the race. It is considered by many to be the greatest Derby field of all time.

One of the most infamous moments in Derby history also occurred during the 1957 stretch run. Bill Shoemaker, aboard Gallant Man, misjudged the finish, mistaking the 16th pole for the wire. He stood in his saddle for just a second, but it was enough to ruin Gallant Man's momentum and allow Iron Liege to rally up the inside and beat Gallant Man by a nose.

Gallant Man won the Belmont Stakes a few weeks later. Fourth place finisher Bold Ruler won the Preakness Stakes and was the sire of the great Secretariat.

== Full results ==
Finished	Post	Horse	Jockey	Trainer	Owner	Time / behind
1st	1A	Iron Liege	Bill Hartack	Horace A. Jones	Calumet Farm	
2nd	5	Gallant Man	Bill Shoemaker	John A. Nerud	Ralph Lowe	
3rd	4	Round Table	Ralph Neves	William Molter	Kerr Stable	
4th	7	Bold Ruler	Eddie Arcaro	James E. Fitzsimmons	Wheatley Stable	
5th	3	Federal Hill	William Carstens	Milton Rieser	Clifford Lussky	
6th	6	Indian Creek	George Taniguchi	James P. Conway	Ada L. Rice	
7th	2	Mister Jive	Hedley Woodhouse	George M. "Bud" Carter	John L. Applebaum	
8th	9	Better Bee	John H. Adams	Del W. Carroll	William S. Miller	
9th	8	Shan Pac	John Ralph Adams	Vester R. Wright	T. Alie Grissom	
