= Bold Ruler =

American-bred Thoroughbred racehorse

- Bold Ruler's grave at Claiborne Farm
- Sire: Nasrullah
- Grandsire: Nearco
- Dam: Miss Disco
- Damsire: Discovery
- Sex: Stallion
- Foaled: 6 April 1954; Claiborne Farm
- Died: 12 July 1971; Claiborne Farm
- Country: United States
- Color: Dark Bay
- Breeder: Wheatley Stable
- Owner: Wheatley Stable
- Trainer: Sunny Jim Fitzsimmons
- Record: 33: 23-4-2
- Earnings: $764,204

Major wins
- Futurity Stakes (1956); Juvenile Stakes (1956); Youthful Stakes (1956); Bahamas Stakes (1957); Flamingo Stakes (1957); Wood Memorial (1957); Jerome Handicap (1957); Vosburgh Handicap (1957); Queens County Handicap (1957); Trenton Handicap (1957); Toboggan Handicap (1958); Carter Handicap (1958); Stymie Handicap (1958); Suburban Handicap (1958); Monmouth Handicap (1958) American Classic Race wins: Preakness Stakes (1957)

Awards
- U.S. 3-Yr-Old Champion Male (1957); American Horse of the Year (1957); U.S. Champion Sprint Horse (1958); Leading sire in North America (1963–1969, 1973)

Honours
- U.S. Racing Hall of Fame (1973); Bold Ruler Handicap at Aqueduct Racetrack #19 - Top 100 U.S. Racehorses of the 20th Century

Bold Ruler (April 6, 1954 – July 12, 1971) was an American Thoroughbred Hall of Fame racehorse who was the 1957 Horse of the Year. This following a three-year-old campaign that included wins in the Preakness Stakes and Trenton Handicap, in which he defeated fellow Hall of Fame inductees Round Table and Gallant Man. Bold Ruler was named American Champion Sprinter at age four, and upon retirement became the leading sire in North America eight times between 1963 and 1973, the most of any sire in the twentieth century.

Bold Ruler sired the 1973 Triple Crown winner Secretariat and was the great-grandsire of 1977 Triple Crown winner Seattle Slew. His descendants include classic winners such as California Chrome.

== Background ==
Bred by the Wheatley Stable of Gladys Mills Phipps, Bold Ruler was foaled on April 6, 1954, at Claiborne Farm in Paris, Kentucky. His sire was Nasrullah, who has the distinction of being a champion sire in both Europe and North America. Bold Ruler's dam was the stakes-winning sprinter Miss Disco, by Discovery. By coincidence, he and rival Round Table were foaled on the same night at Claiborne, and both returned to stand at stud there after their racing careers. He was trained by Sunny Jim Fitzsimmons, and was regularly ridden by Eddie Arcaro.

Bold Ruler was a big, leggy horse, standing 16.1 hands (65 inches, 165 cm) with a great shoulder, powerful hindquarter, and a distinctive long, sloping hip going down to a straight hind leg. This conformation can still be found, especially in horses descended through the Seattle Slew line.

== Racing career ==
The American foal crop of 1954 is considered to be one of the best of the twentieth century, containing three Hall of Fame horses: Bold Ruler, Gallant Man and Round Table, not to mention early standout Gen. Duke and Kentucky Derby winner Iron Liege. Bold Ruler stood out because of his raw speed, combined with courage that allowed him to overcome infirmities ranging from a tender mouth to chronic arthritis and soreness.

At age two, Bold Ruler won seven starts, including the Youthful and Juvenile and the Futurity Stakes. However, he injured his back in the Youthful Stakes when he slammed into the starting gate, then developed a hock problem. He did not race in the Garden State Stakes, then one of the most prestigious races for two-year-olds, and lost the title for champion 2-year-old to the winner of that race, Barbizon.

=== 1957: three-year-old season ===
Bold Ruler began his three-year-old campaign in Florida by winning the Bahamas Stakes on January 30, 1957, while equaling the track record. He then finished second in the Everglade Stakes before taking the Flamingo Stakes while breaking the track record. On March 30, he finished second in the Florida Derby to Gen. Duke, who tied the then-world record of 1:46 4/5 for 9 furlongs.

Bold Ruler was then shipped north to Aqueduct Racetrack in New York for the Wood Memorial Stakes, where he went off as the 1-2 favorite in a field of seven. He opened up an early four-length lead, but Gallant Man gradually closed ground and surged to the front at the top of the stretch. Bold Ruler then fought back and nosed out Gallant Man in the final strides while setting a new track record of 1:48 4/5 for 1 1/8 miles.

The original favorite for the 1957 Kentucky Derby, held on May 4, was the Calumet Farm entry of Gen. Duke, who had defeated Bold Ruler in the Florida Derby, and the more lightly regarded Iron Liege. However, Gen. Duke was scratched after he went lame shortly before the race, so Bold Ruler went off as the 6-5 favorite. He fought against Arcaro's restraint and was carried wide around the first turn while battling for the lead with Federal Hill. He remained in contention until the far turn but faded down the homestretch to finish fourth behind Iron Liege. The race became notorious when Gallant Man, who looked certain to win the race, had his stride briefly checked at the 16th pole by jockey Bill Shoemaker, who had misjudged the position of the finish line.

Fitzsimmons later revealed that Bold Ruler was suffering from a sore mouth, dating back to an incident as a yearling when he nearly tore his tongue in two after catching it on something in his stall. After the Derby, Fitzsimmons decided to use a strip of cloth to tie down the colt's tongue, relieving the pressure caused by the bit. In the Preakness Stakes on May 18, Bold Ruler responded with a front-running victory, with Iron Liege two lengths back in second. Arcaro had let Bold Ruler run at his own pace and later attributed the loss in the Derby to his attempt to restrain the colt.

Gallant Man had bypassed the Preakness, instead winning the Peter Pan Stakes on June 1. The two colts met again in the Belmont Stakes on June 15, with Bold Ruler going off as the 17-20 favorite, while Gallant Man and his stablemate Bold Nero went off at odds of 19-20. Bold Ruler went to the early lead but was closely challenged by Bold Nero. The two set fast early fractions before first Bold Nero then Bold Ruler faltered. Bold Ruler hung on for third but was so tired after the race that he didn't want to return to the unsaddling enclosure. Gallant Man won convincingly and set an American record for 1 1/2 miles of 2:26 3/5. This remained the stakes record until 1973 when Bold Ruler's son Secretariat broke it.

Bold Ruler was given a long layoff to recover from the race and a variety of physical issues. He finally returned to the racetrack in the Times Square Handicap on September 9, in which he carried top weight of 128 pounds. Going off as the 17-20 favorite, he won in front-running fashion by 5 1/2 lengths. He followed this up with a six length victory in the Jerome Handicap on September 14 while carrying 130 pounds. In the Jerome, Arcaro was able to get the colt to settle behind a fast early pace, then took command turning into the stretch. "He's a different colt," said Arcaro. "He's lost all those goofy habits and takes off just when you want him."

On September 28, Bold Ruler entered the Woodward Stakes over a distance of 1 1/4 miles. His three rivals included Gallant Man, who was on a six-race winning streak, and Dedicate, a top-class older horse. Bold Ruler broke well but soon settled into second behind Reneged, who set a brisk early pace. With three furlongs remaining, Bold Ruler moved up to battle for the lead while Gallant Man and Dedicate started to close ground. The four horses were tightly bunched at the eight pole before Dedicate took command to win by 1 1/2 lengths over Gallant Man, with Bold Ruler finishing third.

In the Vosburgh Handicap on October 9, Bold Ruler was assigned the top weight in a field of eight, six of which were older horses. He battled for the early lead with Nearctic, then started to draw away to win by nine lengths. Over a muddy track and despite being eased by Arcaro down the stretch, he set a track record of 1:21 2/5 for seven furlongs.

On October 19, Bold Ruler carried 133 pounds in the Queens County Handicap, giving away from 19 to 23 pounds to his competitors. He went to the early lead and opened up a six length lead before being eased in the stretch. The final margin of victory was 2 1/2 lengths. He followed up with a dominating win in the Benjamin Franklin Handicap on November 2, winning by 12 lengths despite carrying 136 pounds. Jockey Bill Hartack, riding the third-place finisher, commented after the race, "I don't know how good Bold Ruler is. I never got close enough to see."

With a record of ten wins from 15 starts in 1957, Bold Ruler was still considered only the third best three-year-old in the country. Gallant Man had won eight races, including wins over Bold Ruler in the Belmont and Woodward, while Round Table had accumulated 14 wins over dirt and turf surfaces, mainly in California. The battle for Horse of the Year honors would be decided in the Trenton Handicap at 1 1/4 miles on November 9, in what North American racing historians rank among the greatest meetings ever of three horses in one race. Round Table and Gallant Man were both assigned 124 pounds while Bold Ruler carried 122 pounds. Bold Ruler went to the early lead, opening an advantage of seven or eight lengths going into the far turn. Gallant Man closed the lead to four lengths at the top of the stretch and looked like he might mount a challenge. Arcaro then looked back and waved his whip at Bold Ruler, who responded to hold off Gallant Man by 2 1/2 lengths. Round Table was far back in third. "I didn't think they would let me get so far in front," said Arcaro of his racing tactics. "I thought they'd be on me from the half-mile pole on, but they weren't. I stayed out from the rail, out towards the middle of the track, because the going was better there."

His performances that year earned Bold Ruler the title of American Champion Three-Year-Old Male Horse. In the Horse of the Year poll organised by the publishers of Daily Racing Form, he received 16 votes to beat Gallant Man (9 votes) and older horse Dedicate (4 votes). Dedicate was controversially selected over Bold Ruler in the rival Thoroughbred Racing Association award, but Bold Ruler's win in a third poll conducted by Turf and Sport Digest magazine made him the "consensus" choice as Horse of the Year.

=== 1958: four-year-old season ===
At age four, Bold Ruler carried from 133 to 136 pounds in his seven starts, was the odds-on favorite in all seven, and won five. He won at distances from six furlongs in the Toboggan Handicap to 1 1/4 miles in the Suburban and Monmouth Handicaps.

Bold Ruler started the year in Florida, first targeting a seven-furlong sprint in January for his debut, then the Widener Handicap in February. However, in both cases he became injured shortly before the race and was given time off to recover. He was then scheduled to debut at Jamaica Racetrack in late March but suffered another setback. As it turned out, he did not make his first start of the year until May 17 in the Toboggan Handicap, a six-furlong sprint at Belmont Park. Carrying top weight of 133 pounds, he settled into third place in the early running then sprinted clear down the stretch to win by half a length over Clem, who was carrying only 117 pounds.

In the 7-furlong Carter Handicap on May 30, Bold Ruler faced his old rival Gallant Man, who was making his seasonal debut. Bold Ruler was assigned 135 pounds compared to 128 pounds for Gallant Man. Bold Ruler once again rated close behind the early pace, while Gallant Man was far back. Gallant Man made a strong late run to finish third, but never threatened Bold Ruler, who drew off for a 1 1/2 length win.

Gallant Man gained his revenge in the Metropolitan Handicap on June 14, closing from well back to overtake the front-running Bold Ruler in deep stretch. Arcaro attributed the loss to the high weight of 135 pounds combined with a strong headwind, which took its toll in the final furlong of the one-mile race.

For Bold Ruler's next start, Fitzsimmons was faced with the choice of being assigned 138 pounds in the Roseben Handicap, run at Bold Ruler's favorite distance of seven furlongs, or 133 pounds in the Stymie Handicap, over nine furlongs. Fitzsimmon chose the longer race with a lower weight, explaining, "I don't mind horses getting beaten. The only way you can avoid that is to keep them in the barn. But I've got to keep this horse sound and I don't think weight helps me do that." Bold Ruler responded with a front running five-length victory while setting a new track record.

On July 4, Bold Ruler stretched out to a distance of 10 furlongs in the Suburban Handicap while carrying 134 pounds – at least 18 pounds more than any of his rivals. He vied for the lead with Clem and Beau Diable for the first half mile, then cut over to the rail and opened a three length lead as they rounded the final turn. Down the stretch, Clem started to close ground and actually got a head in front before Bold Ruler rallied in the final strides to win by a nose.

Bold Ruler made his next start on July 18 in the Monmouth Handicap, also at a distance of 10 furlongs while carrying 134 pounds. He went straight to the lead and set an even tempo, then "coasted home" to win by three-quarters of a length over Sharpsburg. Despite the apparent ease of the win, Fitzsimmons called it a "real hard race" and said that he might bypass the upcoming Brooklyn Handicap. But he ultimately decided to enter the colt in the race despite being assigned 136 pounds. Bold Ruler settled in third place but was heavily bumped by Sharpsburg on the final turn and faded to seventh. Sharpsburg went on to finish second but was disqualified to last for the interference. Arcaro felt that the bump did not cost Bold Ruler a chance to win, saying "he just wasn't operating right at any point in the race."

Just three weeks later, Fitzsimmons announced that Bold Ruler was being retired because of an ankle injury. "He may have injured the ankle in the Brooklyn, or in training," he said. "I know that something happened to him, but I don't know when it happened or exactly what he's got." Although a return to racing later in the year might have been possible, Fitzsimmons felt Bold Ruler was too valuable to risk. He ended his career with 23 wins, including 17 stakes wins, from 33 starts, with earnings of $764,204.

Despite having made only two starts during the year at distances under a mile, Bold Ruler was still named the American Champion Sprint Horse of 1958.

== Stud record ==
Bold Ruler retired to stud at Claiborne Farm in 1959, where he became the leading sire in North America from 1963 to 1969 and again in 1973. His eight titles were the highest for a North American sire in the twentieth century. Although several of his runners won at 10 furlongs or more, Bold Ruler was best known as a sire of precocious 2-year-olds, leading the juvenile sire list a then-record six times. From 366 named foals, he sired 240 winners (65.6%) and 82 stakes winners (22.4%), including Hall of Famers Gamely and Secretariat.

He sired 11 champions:

1. Lamb Chop (b. 1960) - American Champion Three-Year-Old Filly
2. Bold Bidder (b. 1962) - American Co-champion Older Male Horse (1966)
3. Bold Lad (b. 1962) - American Champion Two-Year-Old Colt
4. Queen Empress (b. 1962) - American Champion Two-Year-Old Filly
5. Gamely (b. 1964) - American Champion Three-Year-Old Filly, American Champion Older Female Horse (1968–69), Hall of Fame (1980)
6. Bold Lad (IRE) (b. 1964) - Top rated British Two-Year-Old, bred and raced by Gladys Phipps' sister, Beatrice Mills Forbes, Countess Granard.
7. Successor (b. 1964) - American Champion Two-Year-Old Colt
8. Queen of the Stage (b. 1965) - American Champion Two-Year-Old Filly
9. Vitriolic (b. 1965) - American Champion Two-Year-Old Colt
10. Secretariat (b. 1970) - 9th U.S. Triple Crown Champion, American Horse of the Year (1972–73), 1972 Champion Two-Year-Old Colt, 1973 Champion Three-Year-Old colt, 1973 American Champion Turf Horse, Hall of Fame (1974)
11. Wajima (b. 1972) - American Champion Three-Year-Old Male Horse

Bold Ruler was also the dominant American sire of sires in the 1970s. His sire line includes:

- Bold and Brave, sire of Bold 'n Determined, elected to the Hall of Fame in 1997
- Bold Bidder, sire of 1974 Kentucky Derby winner Cannonade and Spectacular Bid, who won the 1979 Kentucky Derby and Preakness Stakes and was elected to the Hall of Fame in 1982. Grandsire of Hall of Fame inductee Bayakoa.
- Bold Commander, sire of 1970 Kentucky Derby winner Dust Commander, who would in turn sire 1975 Preakness Stakes winner Master Derby
- Boldnesian, sire of Bold Reasoning, sire of 1977 Triple Crown Winner and Hall of Fame inductee Seattle Slew
- Irish Castle, sire of 1976 Kentucky Derby and Belmont Stakes winner Bold Forbes
- Raja Baba, leading sire of 1980
- Reviewer, sire of 1975 champion 3-year-old filly Ruffian, elected to the Hall of Fame in 1976
- Top Command, sire of Hall of Fame inductee Mom's Command
- Secretariat, sire of Risen Star, winner of the 1988 Preakness and Belmont, and Lady's Secret, 1986 Horse of the Year and Hall of Fame inductee
- What a Pleasure, sire of 1975 Kentucky Derby winner and Hall of Fame inductee Foolish Pleasure

His sire line almost died out in the 1980s but was revived by Seattle Slew's son A.P. Indy (who was also a grandson of Secretariat on his dam's side). Much like Bold Ruler, A.P. Indy was a Horse of the Year, a leading sire and would go on to become an important sire of sires. In 2014, A.P. Indy's great-grandson California Chrome became the 16th male-line descendant of Bold Ruler to capture an American classic. A.P. Indy is also the grandsire of leading sire Tapit, who sired three winners of the Belmont Stakes in the four years between 2014 and 2017.

== Death and legacy ==
Bold Ruler was the first horse to undergo radiation therapy when he was diagnosed with sinus cancer in 1971. At age 17, he died at Claiborne Farm on July 12, 1971, and is interred there. In 1973, he was posthumously inducted into the National Museum of Racing and Hall of Fame. Bold Ruler was listed at No. 19 in the Blood-Horse magazine ranking of the top 100 United States thoroughbred horse racing champions of the 20th century. The Bold Ruler Handicap at Aqueduct is named in his honor.

== Pedigree ==
Pedigree of Bold Ruler
Sire Nasrullah	Nearco	Pharos	Phalaris
Sire Nasrullah	Nearco	Pharos	Scapa Flow
Sire Nasrullah	Nearco	Nogara	Havresac
Sire Nasrullah	Nearco	Nogara	Catnip
Sire Nasrullah	Mumtaz Begum	Blenheim	Blandford
Sire Nasrullah	Mumtaz Begum	Blenheim	Malva
Sire Nasrullah	Mumtaz Begum	Mumtaz Mahal	The Tetrarch
Sire Nasrullah	Mumtaz Begum	Mumtaz Mahal	Lady Josephine
Dam Miss Disco	Discovery	Display	Fair Play
Dam Miss Disco	Discovery	Display	Cicuta
Dam Miss Disco	Discovery	Ariadne	Light Brigade
Dam Miss Disco	Discovery	Ariadne	Adrienne
Dam Miss Disco	Outdone	Pompey	Sun Briar
Dam Miss Disco	Outdone	Pompey	Cleopatra
Dam Miss Disco	Outdone	Sweep Out	Sweep On
Dam Miss Disco	Outdone	Sweep Out	Dugout

== See also ==
- List of racehorses
