= Horace A. Jones =

American horse trainer (1906–2001)

Jimmy Jones
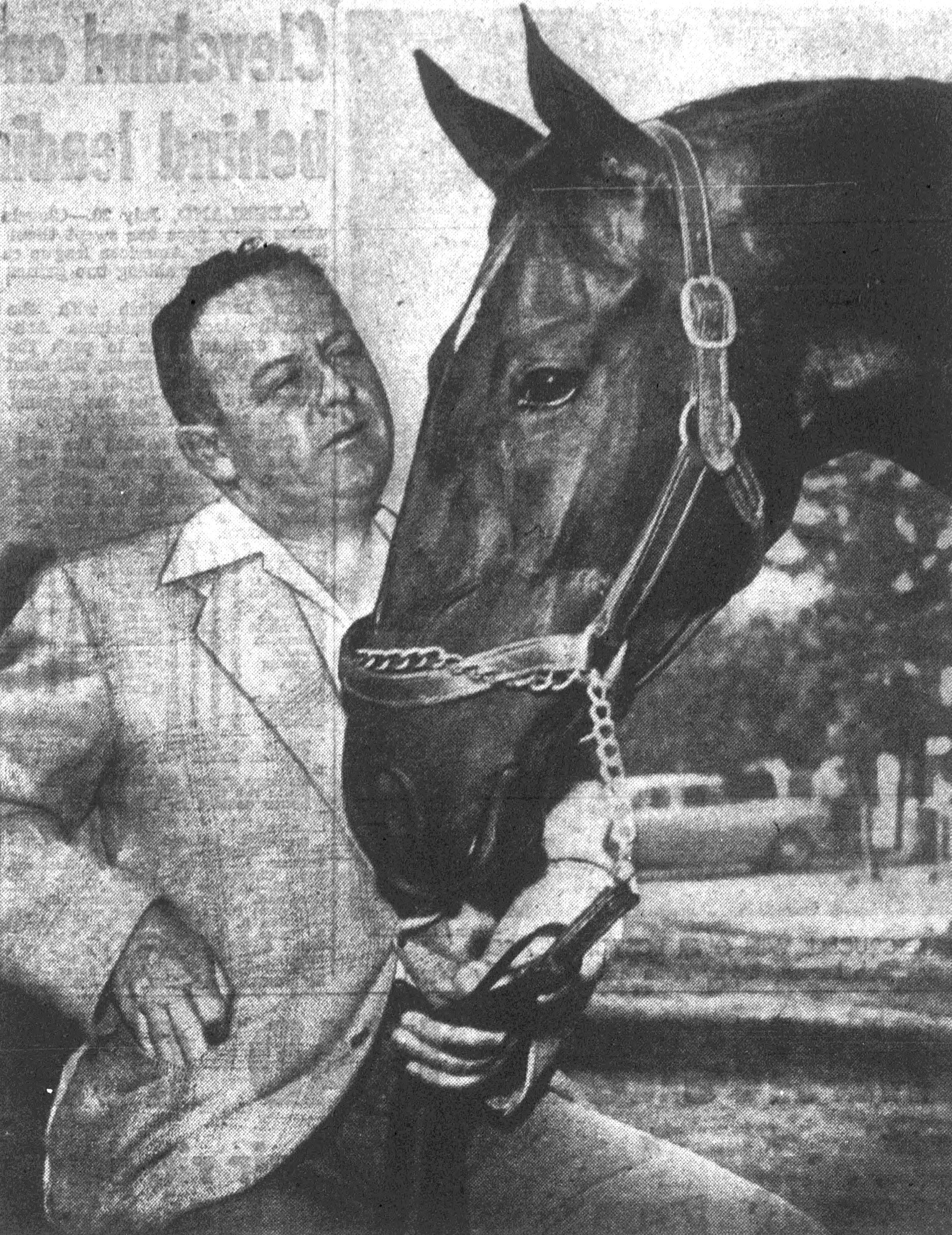
- Jones, circa 1951

Personal information
- Born: November 24, 1906 Parnell, Missouri
- Died: September 2, 2001 (aged 94)
- Occupation: Trainer

Horse racing career
- Sport: Horse racing

Major racing wins
- (selected); Arlington Handicap (1947, 1949, 1950); Pimlico Special (1948 /); Arlington Classic (1949); Hollywood Gold Cup (1951, 1952); Santa Anita Derby (1952, 1953); Santa Anita Handicap (1953); Jersey Derby (1956, 1957); Florida Derby (1957, 1958); Royal Palm Handicap (1961); Travers Stakes (1961) American Classic Race wins: Kentucky Derby (1957, 1958); Preakness Stakes (1947, 1948, 1956, 1958); Belmont Stakes (1948)

Racing awards
- U.S. Champion Trainer by earnings (1947, 1948, 1949, 1957, 1961)

Honours
- National Museum of Racing and Hall of Fame (1959)

Significant horses
- Barbizon, Bewitch, Citation, Fabius, Faultless; Gen. Duke, Hill Gail, Iron Liege, Ponder; Real Delight, Tim Tam, Two Lea

Horace A. "Jimmy" Jones (November 24, 1906 – September 2, 2001) was an American thoroughbred horse trainer.

The son of Hall of Fame horse trainer Ben A. Jones, Jimmy Jones was born in Parnell, Missouri. Raised around horses from infancy, he learned how to train them from his father while working with him at Woolford Farm in Prairie Village, Kansas from 1931 to 1939, after which his father signed on as the head trainer at Calumet Farm in Lexington, Kentucky. There, Jimmy worked as his father's assistant but his career was interrupted when he joined the United States military during World War II. After the war ended he returned to training horses, and in 1948 took over as head trainer from his father, who was appointed Calumet Farm's general manager.

In 1948 Jimmy Jones stepped aside as the trainer of record for Citation to allow his father to be officially designated as the trainer for the Kentucky Derby. Ben Jones wanted the opportunity to equal the record of Herbert J. "Derby Dick" Thompson, who had trained four Derby winners. Citation won the race. Ben Jones later returned to training and won the Derby two more times. Jimmy Jones was named Citation's trainer for the Preakness Stakes and the Belmont Stakes. Citation became the Jones family's second U.S. Triple Crown winner. In 1957, Jimmy Jones won his first "official" Kentucky Derby with Iron Liege, and claimed victory again the next year with future Hall of Fame colt Tim Tam, who also won the Preakness. Many fans and race experts believe Tim Tam would have won the Triple Crown had he not broken a sesamoid bone in his right foreleg coming down the home stretch in the Belmont Stakes, where he finished second.

As head trainer for Calumet Farm, Jimmy Jones trained seven champion horses and won 54 stakes races. In addition to his two Derby wins, he won four Preakness Stakes and one Belmont Stakes. He was the leading trainer in the United States five times (1947, 1948, 1949, 1957, 1961) and was the first trainer to earn more than $1 million in purses in a single season. In 1959, he followed his father as an inductee into the National Museum of Racing and Hall of Fame. He retired from training in 1964 to take over as the Director of Racing at Monmouth Park Racetrack in Oceanport, New Jersey.

Jones spent his final years in full retirement in his native Missouri, where he spent the last few years of his life at St. Francis Hospital and Health Services in Maryville. He bequeathed several million dollars to the hospital, where a new patient wing was erected with several pieces of memorabilia put on display in his memory.

== Kentucky Derby Record ==
Year	Horse	Finish
1948	Citation	1st †
1956	Fabius	2nd
1956	Pintor Lea	5th
1957	Iron Liege	1st
1958	Tim Tam	1st

† - While Jimmy Jones was the trainer of Citation, he allowed his father Ben Jones to be listed as the trainer in the Kentucky Derby. He took over Citation's training and won the Preakness and Belmont.
