= 1948 Kentucky Derby =

Horse race

74th Kentucky Derby
- Kentucky Derby
- Grade I stakes race
- Location: Churchill Downs
- Date: May 1, 1948
- Winning horse: Citation
- Winning time: 2:05 2/5
- Jockey: Eddie Arcaro
- Trainer: Ben A. Jones
- Owner: Calumet Farm
- Conditions: Three-year-olds
- Surface: Dirt

The 1948 Kentucky Derby was the 74th running of the Kentucky Derby. The race took place on May 1, 1948, on a track rated sloppy.

== Full results ==
Finished	Post	Horse	Jockey	Trainer	Owner	Time / behind
1st	1	Citation	Eddie Arcaro	Ben A. Jones	Calumet Farm	2:05 2/5
2nd	1a	Coaltown	Newbold L. Pierson	Ben A. Jones	Calumet Farm	
3rd	5	My Request	Douglas Dodson	James P. Conway	Florence Whitaker	
4th	4	Billings	Melvin Peterson	Howard Wells	Walmac Stable	
5th	3	Grand Pere	John Gilbert	E. H. J. Shaw	Muriel Vanderbilt Adams	
6th	2	Escadru	Arnold Kirkland	Edward A. Christmas	William L. Brann	

- Winning breeder: Calumet Farm (KY)
