= Fabius (horse) =

American-bred Thoroughbred racehorse

- Sire: Citation
- Grandsire: Bull Lea
- Dam: Shameen
- Damsire: Royal Minstrel
- Sex: Stallion
- Foaled: April 6, 1953
- Country: United States
- Colour: Brown
- Breeder: Calumet Farm
- Owner: Calumet Farm
- Trainer: Horace A. Jones
- Rider: Bill Hartack
- Record: 65: 18-9-12
- Earnings: $ 331,384

Major wins
- Forerunner Stakes (1956); Derby Trial Stakes (1956); Jersey Stakes (1956); Armed Handicap (1957) Triple Crown wins: Preakness Stakes (1956)

Fabius (foaled April 6, 1953) was an American Thoroughbred racehorse. In a career that lasted from 1955 through 1957, he ran sixty-two times and won eighteen races. He is best known for his performances in the 1956 Triple Crown: after finishing second in the Kentucky Derby. He won the Preakness Stakes and finished third in the Belmont Stakes.

== Background ==
Fabius was a "delicate-looking" brown horse bred and raced by Lexington, Kentucky's Calumet Farm. He was from the first crop of foals sired by Citation, who won the 1948 U.S. Triple Crown for Calumet in 1948 and became an inductee of the Hall of Fame. Citation was considered a disappointment as a stallion, and Fabius was his only winner of a Triple Crown race. He was out of the mare Shameen, a daughter of British Eclipse Stakes winner Royal Minstrel, who was a son of 2,000 Guineas Stakes winner Tetratema. As a member of Thoroughbred "Family" 3-o, Fabius was distantly related to the British Classic winners Santa Claus, Carrozza and Shahrastani. Although Fabius was bred in Kentucky, his pedigree was overwhelmingly European: of the sixteen horses in the fourth generation of his pedigree, only two were of American origin.

The colt was sent into training with Horace A. "Jimmy" Jones and was usually ridden by Bill Hartack.

== Racing career ==
In his first race of 1956, Fabius won the Florida Purse at Hialeah Park Race Track. He then ran third in both the Fountain of Youth at Gulfstream Park and Hialeah's Flamingo Stakes. Four days before the 1956 Kentucky Derby, Fabius recorded a one-length win in the Derby Trial Stakes at Churchill Downs, leading to his being considered a serious contender for the first leg of the Triple Crown: six of the previous eight Derby winners had finished either first or second in the Trial. In the Derby, Fabius went to the front after a quarter of a mile and held the lead well into the stretch. An eighth of a mile from the finish, he was overtaken by the favorite, Needles, and finished second, beaten three quarters of a length.

In the Preakness Stakes at Pimlico Race Course, Fabius started 2.5/1 second favorite behind Needles in a field of nine colts, with some observers expressing the view that the shorter distance and tighter turns could give him an edge over the Derby winner. Hartack sent Fabius into the lead half a mile from the finish, and the Calumet colt held a clear advantage as the runners turned for home. Needles came from well back in the field to reduce the margin but could not catch Fabius, who won the second leg of the U.S. Triple Crown by one and three quarter lengths.

Fabius was expected to start favorite for the Belmont Stakes, especially after a win in the Jersey Stakes on May 26 which led some commentators to draw comparisons with his sire. In his final prep race, however, he ran was beaten six lengths by 23/1 outsider Ricci Tavi in the Leonard Richards Stakes at Delaware Park Racetrack. In the Belmont, Fabius got the better of a prolonged struggle with Ricci Tavi and Charlevoix to turn into the stretch one and a half lengths in front. As in the Derby, he was overtaken by Needles at the eighth pole and finished third, with the fast-closing Career Boy taking second place.

The rivalry between Fabius and Needles continued into 1957, but early in the year it was another Calumet horse, the five-year-old Bardstown, who proved the best of the handicap division. In early March, Fabius produced a "blazing stretch run" to win the Armed Handicap at Gulfstream Park, but in the climactic race of the Florida campaign, Fabius and Needles were decisively beaten by Bardstown in the Gulfstream Park Handicap.

== Stud record ==
Fabius retired from racing to become a breeding stallion for Calumet Farm, but proved to be a failure as a sire of winners. From his few offspring, the best may have been multiple Canadian stakes winner Fabe Count.

== Pedigree ==
Pedigree of Fabius (USA) brown 1953
Sire Citation (USA) 1945	Bull Lea (USA); 1935	Bull Dog (FR)	Teddy (FR)
Sire Citation (USA) 1945	Bull Lea (USA); 1935	Bull Dog (FR)	Plucky Liege (GB)
Sire Citation (USA) 1945	Bull Lea (USA); 1935	Rose Leaves (USA)	Ballot (USA)
Sire Citation (USA) 1945	Bull Lea (USA); 1935	Rose Leaves (USA)	Colonial (GB)
Sire Citation (USA) 1945	Hydroplane (GB); 1938	Hyperion (GB)	Gainsborough (GB)
Sire Citation (USA) 1945	Hydroplane (GB); 1938	Hyperion (GB)	Selene (GB)
Sire Citation (USA) 1945	Hydroplane (GB); 1938	Toboggan (GB)	Hurry On (GB)
Sire Citation (USA) 1945	Hydroplane (GB); 1938	Toboggan (GB)	Glacier (GB)
Dam Shameen 1939	Royal Minstrel (GB); 1925	Tetratema (GB)	The Tetrarch (IRE)
Dam Shameen 1939	Royal Minstrel (GB); 1925	Tetratema (GB)	Scotch Gift (GB)
Dam Shameen 1939	Royal Minstrel (GB); 1925	Harpsichord (IRE)	Louvois (GB)
Dam Shameen 1939	Royal Minstrel (GB); 1925	Harpsichord (IRE)	Golden Harp (GB)
Dam Shameen 1939	Silver Beauty (USA); 1928	Stefan the Great (GB)	The Tetrarch (IRE)
Dam Shameen 1939	Silver Beauty (USA); 1928	Stefan the Great (GB)	Perfect Peach (GB)
Dam Shameen 1939	Silver Beauty (USA); 1928	Jeanne Bowdre (USA)	Luke McLuke (USA)
Dam Shameen 1939	Silver Beauty (USA); 1928	Jeanne Bowdre (USA)	Black Brocade (GB) (family 3-o)

- Through the influence of his dam, Fabius was inbred 4x4 to The Tetrarch, meaning that this stallion appears twice in the fourth generation of his pedigree.
