= James D. Nichols =

American jockey

James Nichols
Personal information
- Born: March 1928 Las Cruces, New Mexico
- Died: February 27, 2003 (aged 74) Fort Worth, Texas
- Occupation: Jockey

Horse racing career
- Sport: Horse racing
- Career wins: 2,446

Major racing wins
- San Diego Handicap (1947); Osunitas Stakes (1948); San Carlos Handicap (1949); Toboggan Handicap (1950); Aqueduct Handicap (1951); Dixie Handicap (1951); Sanford Stakes (1952); Acorn Stakes (1953); Bay Shore Handicap (1953); Demoiselle Stakes (1953); Paumonok Handicap (1953); Adirondack Stakes (1954); Astoria Stakes (1954); Fashion Stakes (1954); National Stallion Stakes (filly division) (1954); Palm Beach Handicap (1954); Wilson Handicap (1955); Frizette Stakes (1956); Saratoga Special Stakes (1957); Alcibiades Stakes (1958, 1974); John B. Campbell Handicap (1962); New Orleans Handicap (1962, 1963); Beverly Handicap (1963, 1966, 1967); Lafayette Stakes (1963, 1964); Arlington Handicap (1963); Ben Ali Stakes (1963, 1975); Arlington-Washington Lassie Stakes (1965); Ashland Stakes (1965); Breeders' Futurity Stakes (1965, 1966); Clark Handicap (1965); Bewitch Stakes (1966, 1971, 1972, 1973); Modesty Handicap (1966); Arkansas Derby (1967, 1970); Sysonby Handicap (1967); Equipoise Mile (1968); Salvator Mile Handicap (1968); Derby Trial Stakes (1970); Louisiana Handicap (1972, 1973); Apple Blossom Handicap (1975); Fayette Stakes (1975); Hopeful Stakes (1975)

Honours
- Fair Grounds Racing Hall of Fame (1993)

Significant horses
- Bryan G., Decidedly, Graustark, High Voltage, R. Thomas, Susan's Girl

James Dee "Jimmy" Nichols (March 1928 – February 27, 2003) was an American Thoroughbred horse racing jockey and horseman who, after retiring from race-riding, played a key role in the two U.S. Triple Crown race wins of Risen Star.

Known as "Jimmy", and nicknamed "Cowboy," he competed in rodeo bull riding, worked as a stable groom, and then went on to become a successful jockey in Quarter Horse racing before turning to Thoroughbred flat racing.

== Riding career ==
In 1947 Jimmy Nichols was the leading apprentice jockey at Hollywood Park Racetrack and the following year, the leading jockey at Del Mar Racetrack. He went on to ride for major racing stable owners such as Christopher Chenery, George A. Pope Jr., the Phipps family's Wheatley Stable, Fred W. Hooper and John W. Galbreath. During his career, Nichols rode in seven U.S. Triple Crown races, his best finish a third aboard Gentleman James in the 1967 Belmont Stakes.

After thirty-two years, Jimmy Nichols retired from riding in 1979 and went to work as a steward at various racetracks including Fair Grounds Race Course in New Orleans, Waterford Park near Chester, West Virginia and finally at Trinity Meadows Race Track in Willow Park, Texas.

In 1993, Jimmy Nichols was inducted into the Fair Grounds Racing Hall of Fame. He suffered from kidney failure in 1995 and spent his last years working in the jockeys' room at Lone Star Park in Grand Prairie, Texas.

== Risen Star ==
Even after his retirement from riding, Jimmy Nichols was sought out by owners in the horse racing industry for his knowledge of Thoroughbreds. The best known example of this occurred in 1987 with Louie Roussel, an owner/trainer who also owned Fair Grounds Race Course in New Orleans. Roussel hired Nichols to check out approximately twenty two-year-old Thoroughbreds coming up for auction and to make buying recommendations. The result was Nichols recommending a colt that Roussel and partner Ronnie Lamarque would acquire for $300,000 and name Risen Star. At age three, the son of Secretariat just missed out on winning the 1988 U.S. Triple Crown series when he was a narrowly beaten third in the Kentucky Derby then won the Preakness and Belmont Stakes. Throughout Risen Star's campaign, Jimmy Nichols maintained an important role. He turned down a job offer from Ellis Park Race Course to remain as the exercise rider of Risen Star in exchange for a bonus of one lifetime breeding right to the valuable colt.
