= Career Boy =

American-bred Thoroughbred racehorse

- Sire: Phalanx
- Grandsire: Pilate
- Dam: Swanky
- Damsire: Mahmoud
- Sex: Stallion
- Foaled: 1953
- Country: United States
- Colour: Black/Brown
- Breeder: Cornelius Vanderbilt Whitney
- Owner: Cornelius Vanderbilt Whitney
- Trainer: Sylvester Veitch
- Record: 30: 8-5-4
- Earnings: $251,089

Major wins
- Grand Union Hotel Stakes (1955); United States Hotel Stakes (1955); Gotham Stakes (1956); United Nations Handicap (1956)

Awards
- American Champion Male Turf Horse (1956)

Career Boy (foaled 1953 in Kentucky) was an American Champion Thoroughbred racehorse.

== Background ==
He was bred and raced by Cornelius Vanderbilt Whitney, a member of the prominent horse-racing Whitney family. Out of the mare Swanky, whose damsire Mahmoud won the 1936 Epsom Derby, he was sired by Whitney's Phalanx, the 1947 Belmont Stakes winner and American Champion Three-Year-Old Male Horse.

Career Boy was trained by future U.S. Racing Hall of Fame inductee Sylvester Veitch.

== Racing career ==
At age two, Career Boy won important races such as the Grand Union Hotel Stakes and the United States Hotel Stakes. He ran second to Needles in the Hopeful Stakes, then had another second-place result in the Garden State Stakes to winner Prince John but ahead of third-place finisher Needles.

Going into his three-year-old season in 1956, Career Boy was assigned the Experimental Free Handicap's 126 pound high-weight. Under jockey Eric Guerin, Career Boy won the Gotham Stakes and ran second in the Blue Grass Stakes en route to a sixth-place finish in the 1956 Kentucky Derby. He did not run in the Preakness Stakes, but in the ensuing Belmont Stakes, the third leg of the U.S. Triple Crown series, he made a powerful stretch run to finish a neck second to Needles with Preakness winner Fabius in third.

In September 1956, Career Boy showed an affinity for racing on the grass with a one-length win under jockey Sam Boulmetis in the United Nations Handicap at Atlantic City Race Course. Owner C. V. Whitney then decided to send his top two runners to Longchamp Racecourse in Paris, France, to run in the prestigious Prix de l'Arc de Triomphe. Entered with stablemate Fisherman and with Eddie Arcaro riding, Career Boy finished fourth in the 1956 Arc to Ribot. Career Boy's 1956 performances earned him American Champion Male Turf Horse honors.

== Stud record ==
Retired to stud duty, Career Boy stood in the United States until age thirteen when he was sent to a breeding operation in Argentina. He was not successful as a sire.
