= Arlington Matron Stakes =

Matron Stakes
- Class: Grade III
- Location: Arlington Park; Illinois, United States
- Inaugurated: 1930
- Race type: Thoroughbred – Flat racing

Race information
- Distance: 1 1/8 miles (9 furlongs)
- Surface: Dirt
- Track: left-handed
- Qualification: Fillies & Mares, 3-years-old & up
- Weight: Assigned
- Purse: $100,000 (2019)

The Matron Stakes is an American Grade III flat horse race for Thoroughbred fillies and mares, aged three years and upward. Raced over a distance of 9 furlongs on the dirt at Arlington Park, Arlington Heights, Illinois every spring. It currently offers a purse of $100,000.

The event was moved to Churchill Downs in 2017.

Inaugurated in 1930, Hall of Fame member, Bewitch, ran second in 1949. Real Delight won it in 1953.

== Recent winners ==
- 1947 – But Why Not
- 1949 – Lithe
- 1957 – Pucker Up
- 2005 – Indy Groove (Charles Woods)
- 2006 – Sea Siren
- 2007 – Solo Survivor
- 2008 – Indescribable (Jeremy Rose)
- 2009 – Euphony (Cliff Berry)
- 2010 – Tizaqueena (E. T. Baird)
- 2011 – Pachattack (Florent Geroux)
- 2012 – Upperline (James Graham)
- 2013 – Imposing Grace (João Moreira)
- 2014 – La Tia (E. T. Baird)
- 2015 – Race not held
- 2016 – Flipcup (Christopher A. Emigh)
- 2017 – Walkabout
- 2018 – Princess La Quinta
- 2019 – Coachwhip
