= Bewitch =

American-bred Thoroughbred racehorse

- Sire: Bull Lea
- Grandsire: Bull Dog
- Dam: Potheen
- Damsire: Wildair
- Sex: Filly
- Foaled: 1945
- Country: United States
- Colour: Brown
- Breeder: Calumet Farm
- Owner: Calumet Farm
- Trainer: Ben Jones; H. A. "Jimmy" Jones
- Record: 55 Starts: 20-10-11
- Earnings: $462,605

Major wins
- Hyde Park Stakes (1947); Washington Park Futurity (1947); Arlington Lassie Stakes (1947); Princess Pat Stakes (1947); Debutante Stakes (1947); Modesty Stakes (1948); Ashland Stakes (1948); Beverly Handicap (1949); Vineland Handicap (1949); Black Helen Handicap (1949); Vanity Handicap (1950)

Awards
- American Champion Two-Year-Old Filly (1947); American Champion Older Female Horse (1949)

Honours
- U.S. Racing Hall of Fame (1977) #89 - Top 100 U.S. Racehorses of the 20th Century; Bewitch Stakes (1962– )
- Last updated on 29 April 2021

Bewitch (1945–1959) was a Thoroughbred race horse born in 1945 at Calumet Farm, Kentucky, United States in the same crop in which the stallion Bull Lea produced Citation and Coaltown. Each of them was eventually inaugurated into the Thoroughbred Hall of Fame. Bewitch was the only filly of the three.

From her dam, Potheen (purchased by Warren Wright for the small sum of $500), Bewitch inherited the blood of Broomstick, whose sire was the great Ben Brush. On her mother's side also flowed the blood of Peter Pan (sired by Commando) and Hanover (sired by Hindoo).

Trained by the Hall of Famer Ben A. Jones, as a two-year-old Bewitch won her first eight starts, six of them consecutive stakes races. In her first effort, she led throughout and won by six lengths. One of these stakes was the Washington Park Futurity, in which she beat Citation, the only defeat he suffered as a two-year-old.

Before the end of her first season, Ben Jones turned her training over to his son, Jimmy Jones, who also became a member of the Hall of Fame. Bewitch was named the Champion Two-Year-Old Filly for 1947. At the end of her third season, even though she was out of action with bucked shins until late June, she won four of her six starts.

When she was four, she won the Beverly Handicap at the old Washington Park Race Track in Chicago, Illinois, and she ran the fastest mile ever run by a filly.

At the age of five, she raced from one end of the country to the other, unplaced only once. When she was six, she ran fifteen times, twelve of those races against males.

When she retired, Bewitch had earned $462,605, which made her the greatest money-earning filly to date. In 1977, she was inducted into the Hall of Fame along with both her trainers, father and son, as well as her running mates, Citation and Coaltown.

== Racing record ==
- At two: Won the Dixiana Purse, Thoroughbred Club Dinner Purse, Washington Park Futurity, the Arlington Lassie Stakes, the Pollyanna Stakes, the Princess Pat Stakes, the Hyde Park Stakes, and the Debutante Stakes, and came in third in the Futurity Stakes. Also Bewitch was first past the post in the Matron Stakes but was disqualified and placed 4th.
- At four: Won the Misty Isle Handicap, the Beverly Handicap, and the Vineland Handicap, and placed in the Arlington Matron Handicap.
- At five: They won the Black Helen Handicap, placed in the Vanity Handicap and the Columbiana Handicap, and was third in the Premiere Handicap and the Vineland Handicap.
- At six: Won the Vanity Handicap, placed in the Hollywood Gold Cup (on the heels of Citation), placed in the Santa Margarita Handicap, the American Handicap, and the St. Patrick's Day Handicap.

== Assessment ==
In a poll among members of the American Trainers Association, conducted in 1955 by Delaware Park Racetrack, Bewitch was voted the ninth greatest filly in American racing history. Gallorette was voted first.

== Retired ==
Bewitch had only two foals, both of which died before they reached racing age. When she herself died in 1959, she was buried at Calumet.

== Pedigree ==
Pedigree of Bewitch, brown mare, 1945
| Sire Bull Lea | Bull Dog | Teddy | Ajax |
| Sire Bull Lea | Bull Dog | Teddy | Rondeau |
| Sire Bull Lea | Bull Dog | Plucky Liege | Spearmint |
| Sire Bull Lea | Bull Dog | Plucky Liege | Concertina |
| Sire Bull Lea | Rose Leaves | Ballot | Voter |
| Sire Bull Lea | Rose Leaves | Ballot | Cerito |
| Sire Bull Lea | Rose Leaves | Colonial | Trenton |
| Sire Bull Lea | Rose Leaves | Colonial | Thankful Blossom |
| Dam Pothleen | Wildair | Broomstick | Ben Brush |
| Dam Pothleen | Wildair | Broomstick | Elf |
| Dam Pothleen | Wildair | Verdure | Peter Pan |
| Dam Pothleen | Wildair | Verdure | Pastorella |
| Dam Pothleen | Rosie O'Grady | Hamburg | Hanover |
| Dam Pothleen | Rosie O'Grady | Hamburg | Lady Reel |
| Dam Pothleen | Rosie O'Grady | Cherokee Rose | Peter Pan |
| Dam Pothleen | Rosie O'Grady | Cherokee Rose | Royal Rose (family: 8-c) |
