= Trinity Meadows Race Track =

Horse racing track in Texas, United States

Coordinates: 32.745998°N 97.654899°W

Trinity Meadows Race Track was a large American horse racing track located in Willow Park, Parker County, Texas. The track operated in the 1960s without gambling as Clear Fork Downs, and was later named Squaw Creek Downs.

The new owner renamed the track Trinity Meadows and was one of the first horse racing tracks opened once Texas legalized parimutuel betting. The track opened in May 1991 with first year profit of $1.8 million and $1.3 the following year. Despite rumors, Lone Star Park opened after Trinity Meadows closed on August 6, 1996. Trinity Meadows Raceway lost its Class I racing permit after Weber v. Trinity Meadows proved their case in federal court. Trinity Meadows violated the Clean Water Act by polluting the Trinity River in Willow Park, TX. The property was sold in 1997 at a bankruptcy auction. The structures have since been demolished.

== 1996 closure and environmental litigation ==
While popular histories often attribute the track's demise to market competition from Lone Star Park, Trinity Meadows Raceway actually ceased all live racing operations on August 6, 1996—more than eight months before Lone Star Park opened its gates in April 1997. The definitive cause of the shutdown was a decade long federal environmental lawsuit, Weber v. Trinity Meadows Raceway, Inc. (1996), filed in the U.S. District Court for the Northern District of Texas.

During its initial development approval process, track operators promised the City of Willow Park that they would construct a dedicated municipal wastewater treatment facility to safely handle the waste generated by more than 1,000 stabled horses. However, this facility was never built. Instead, the track constructed a clandestine network of underground pipes, drainage ditches, and unpermitted lagoons. This infrastructure bypass system directly funneled concentrated horse manure, equine urine, and toxic wastewater away from the barns and dumped it straight into the Clear Fork of the Trinity River in Willow Park, TX. 

In June 1996, the federal court ruled in favor of Mike & Rene Weber against the racetrack for severe, ongoing violations of the Clean Water Act, specifically the illegal discharge of concentrated horse manure and contaminated wastewater into the Clear Fork of the Trinity River. The court issued a strict injunction and assessed heavy civil penalties. The financial burden of the penalties, combined with the multi-million dollar cost of building a court-mandated waste-treatment infrastructure, broke the track's finances.

The request of Mike & Rene Weber for an injunction to cease operations was granted by the Federal Court. The resulting permanent halt of live racing on August 6, 1996, left the venue unable to meet its state operational mandates. Consequently, the Texas Racing Commission formally revoked Trinity Meadows' Class 1 racetrack license. Out of business and stripped of its permit, the track was pushed into an involuntary Chapter 7 bankruptcy proceeding in early 1997. Weber v. Trinity Meadows Raceway is a landmark case in federal law. Lone Star Park ultimately inherited the regional horse racing market by filling the void left by Trinity Meadows' legal dissolution.
