= Honeymoon (horse) =

American-bred Thoroughbred racehorse

- Sire: Beau Pere
- Grandsire: Son-in-Law
- Dam: Panoramic
- Damsire: Chance Shot
- Sex: Mare
- Foaled: 1943
- Country: United States
- Colour: Bay
- Breeder: Louis B. Mayer
- Owner: 1) Louis B. Mayer; 2) W-L Ranch Co. (1947)
- Trainer: 1) Graceton Philpot; 2) Wayne B. Stucki (1949)
- Record: 78: 20-14-9
- Earnings: US$387,760

Major wins
- California Breeders' Champion Stakes (1945); Cinema Handicap (1946); Drexel Handicap (1946); Golden State Breeders' Handicap (1946); Hollywood Derby (1946); Hollywood Oaks (1946); Santa Maria Handicap (1946); Sequoia Handicap (1946); Vanity Handicap (1947); Beverly Handicap (1948); Top Flight Handicap (1948); Vineland Handicap (1948); Queen Isabella Handicap (1948)

Honours
- California Thoroughbred Hall of Fame (1988); Honeymoon Handicap at Hollywood Park.

Honeymoon (foaled 1943 in California) was an American Thoroughbred race horse who was the first California-bred filly to surpass the $100,000 mark in earnings and who retired with earnings of $387,760. The June 22, 1946 issue of the Los Angeles Times called Honeymoon the "best filly ever bred in California."

== Background ==
Honeymoon was bred and raced by Hollywood movie mogul Louis B. Mayer and was trained by Graceton Philpot.

== Racing career ==
After an outstanding three-year-old campaign in which Honeymoon won seven important California stakes races she was sold for $135,000 in February 1947 as part of Mayer's dispersal sale. Her new owner was W-L Ranch Co., a racing partnership of two other high-profile Hollywood individuals, Harry Warner and Mervyn Le Roy.

In early 1949 a foot injury severely hampered Honeymoon's racing career and after an unsuccessful comeback in 1950 she was retired.

== Retirement and breeding record ==
As a broodmare she produced just three foals. However, her daughter Honey's Gem was a quality runner whose wins included the 1959 Milady Handicap, the 1959 Beverly Handicap in which she set a North American record of 1:34 flat for a mile on dirt, and the 1960 Ramona Handicap. Honeymoon's son, Honey's Alibi, was a multiple graded stakes race winner who was the damsire of the great Dahlia, an international champion and U.S. Racing Hall of Fame inductee.

Harry Warner died in July 1958 and his estate sold off his racing interests in early 1959. As part of the dispersal sale, Honeymoon was purchased for $20,000 by Thomas A. Miller of La Jolla, California.

== Honors ==
Following its creation, in 1988 Honeymoon was inducted in the California Thoroughbred Hall of Fame. In 1956 Hollywood Park Racetrack, the site of a number of her wins, was renamed the Sea Breeze Stakes in her honor.

== Pedigree ==
Pedigree of Honeymoon
Sire Beau Pere	Son-in-Law	Dark Ronald	Bay Ronald
Sire Beau Pere	Son-in-Law	Dark Ronald	Darkie
Sire Beau Pere	Son-in-Law	Mother In Law	Matchmaker
Sire Beau Pere	Son-in-Law	Mother In Law	Be Cannie
Sire Beau Pere	Cinna	Polymelus	Cyllene
Sire Beau Pere	Cinna	Polymelus	Maid Marian
Sire Beau Pere	Cinna	Baroness La Fleche	Landas
Sire Beau Pere	Cinna	Baroness La Fleche	La Fleche
Dam Panoramic	Chance Shot	Fair Play	Hastings
Dam Panoramic	Chance Shot	Fair Play	Fairy Gold
Dam Panoramic	Chance Shot	Quelle Chance	Ethelbert
Dam Panoramic	Chance Shot	Quelle Chance	Quelle Est Belle
Dam Panoramic	Dustwhirl	Sweep	Ben Brush
Dam Panoramic	Dustwhirl	Sweep	Pink Domino
Dam Panoramic	Dustwhirl	Ormonda	Superman
Dam Panoramic	Dustwhirl	Ormonda	Princess Ormonde
