= Citation (horse) =

American-bred Thoroughbred racehorse (1945–1970)

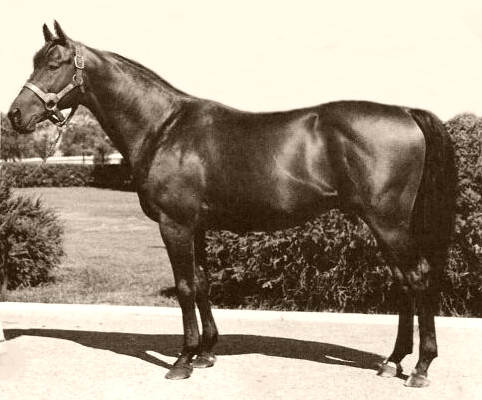
- Sire: Bull Lea
- Grandsire: Bull Dog
- Dam: Hydroplane (GB)
- Damsire: Hyperion
- Sex: Stallion
- Foaled: April 11, 1945; Lexington, Kentucky, U.S.
- Died: August 8, 1970 (aged 25)
- Country: United States
- Color: Bay
- Breeder: Calumet Farm
- Owner: Calumet Farm
- Trainer: Ben A. Jones; Jimmy Jones
- Record: 45: 32–10–2
- Earnings: $1,085,760 (equivalent to $9,001,481 in 2025)

Major wins
- Futurity Stakes (1947); Pimlico Futurity (1947); Chesapeake Stakes (1948); Empire City Gold Cup (1948); Seminole Handicap (1948); Sysonby Handicap (1948); Tanforan Handicap (1948); Flamingo Stakes (1948); Stars and Stripes Handicap (1948); Jockey Club Gold Cup (1948); American Derby (1948); Pimlico Special (1948); Hollywood Gold Cup (1951); Golden Gate Mile Handicap (1950); American Handicap (1951) Triple Crown race wins: Kentucky Derby (1948); Preakness Stakes (1948); Belmont Stakes (1948)

Awards
- 8th U.S. Triple Crown Champion (1948); U.S. Champion 2-Yr-Old Colt (1947); U.S. Champion 3-Yr-Old Colt (1948); DRF Champion Male Handicap Horse (1948); U.S. Horse of the Year (1948); TSD U.S. Champion Older Male Horse (1951); Timeform rating: 142

Honours
- United States Racing Hall of Fame (1959) #3 - Top 100 U.S. Racehorses of the 20th Century; Life-size statue Citation Handicap at Hollywood Park Racetrack; Cessna Citation by Cessna Aircraft Co
- Last updated on 15 September 2010

Citation (April 11, 1945 – August 8, 1970) was a champion American Thoroughbred racehorse who is the eighth winner of the American Triple Crown. He won 16 consecutive stakes races and was the first horse in history to win US$1 million.

== Background ==
Owned and bred by Calumet Farm in Lexington, Kentucky, Citation was a bay colt by Bull Lea from the imported mare Hydroplane (GB), who was by the leading sire Hyperion. Although Citation was bred in Kentucky, his pedigree was largely European. He also traces back through his father Bull Lea to two outstanding horses from New Zealand (Trenton and Carbine), both sired by English sire Musket, the much loved and revered superstar of the late 1800s. As a descendant of the broodmare Glasalt, Citation was related to the 2000 Guineas winner Colorado: the same branch of Thoroughbred "Family" 3-l later produced the Preakness Stakes winner Gate Dancer.

Citation was trained by the Hall of Fame inductee Ben Jones and his son, Hall of Famer Horace A. "Jimmy" Jones. The horse was originally ridden by Al Snider and later by Eddie Arcaro and Steve Brooks.

== Racing career ==
=== 1947: two-year-old season ===
Citation won his first start as a two-year-old at the Havre de Grace racetrack on April 22, 1947. The race was a 4 1/2-furlong sprint on a sloppy track. He won by three-quarters of a length in :54 1/5. He broke the Arlington Park track record over five furlongs in his third start. For the year, he raced nine times, winning eight starts and earning $155,680. His only loss came at the heels of his stablemate, Bewitch, in the Washington Park Futurity, which the filly won in stakes-record time for six furlongs. Citation racked up victories in the Elementary Stakes, Futurity Trial, Futurity Stakes, and Pimlico Futurity. He was named champion two-year-old.

=== 1948: three-year-old season ===
Citation started the 1948 racing season with two victories over older horse Armed, who had been named Thoroughbred racing's 1947 Horse of the Year, in an allowance race and the Seminole Handicap. It is rare for a three-year-old to defeat older horses so early in the year, let alone a top handicap star such as Armed.

After Citation won the Everglades Stakes and the Flamingo Stakes at Hialeah Park, Snider drowned while fishing off the Florida Keys. Calumet Farm hired Arcaro, one of Snider's friends. In Arcaro's first start on Citation, they lost to Saggy in the Chesapeake Trial Stakes. This was the last race that Citation lost for almost two years.

Citation reversed the loss to Saggy in the Chesapeake Stakes at Havre de Grace Racetrack, which he won over Bovard by 4 1/2 lengths, with Saggy well back. "Cy" followed with his final Kentucky Derby prep, a win in the Derby Trial Stakes.

In the Kentucky Derby, ridden by Arcaro, Citation won by 3 1/2 lengths over his stablemate, eventual 1949 Horse of the Year Coaltown, and Arcaro gave the widow of former jockey Al Snider a share of his Derby purse money. Citation was then sent to Baltimore where he won the Preakness Stakes by 5 1/2 lengths. There was a 4-week gap between the Preakness and the Belmont Stakes, and Citation's trainer thought he should run in a race during that time as a "warm-up" for the Belmont. It was decided that Cy would run in the Jersey Stakes, which he won by an easy 11 lengths. On June 12, 1948, Citation became the eighth Triple Crown winner, capturing the Belmont Stakes by 8 lengths and tying the stakes record of 2:28 1/5 set by the sixth Triple Crown winner, Count Fleet.

Citation then won the Stars and Stripes Handicap, equaling Armed's track record. He next won the American Derby and the Sysonby Mile. After that came the Jockey Club Gold Cup at 2 miles (3.2 km), which he won by seven lengths over 1947 Belmont Stakes winner Phalanx. He then won the Empire City Gold Cup.

In Citation's next start, he deterred potential challengers and won the Pimlico Special in a rare walkover. Citation was then sent to California, where he finished the year with two wins, including in the Tanforan Handicap at Tanforan Racetrack.

By the end of his three-year-old season, Citation had a record of 20 starts, 19 wins and $709,470, for a new single-season record. His total career record now stood at 27 victories and two seconds in 29 starts and earnings of $865,150. He had also amassed a 15-race winning streak. For his performances, Citation was named Horse of the Year, gaining 161 of a possible 163 votes in the poll conducted by Turf and Sport Digest magazine. Toward the end of his three-year-old season, he developed an osselet.

=== 1950–1951: later career ===
The osselet injury kept Citation from racing in 1949, but he came back to race in 1950, winning his 16th race in a row at Santa Anita Park (a streak that stood alone among major North American stakes horses until Cigar equaled the feat in 1994–96; Zenyatta and Peppers Pride both later broke the mark by winning their 19th race in a row, Peppers Pride in 2008 and Zenyatta in 2010; Rapid Redux then surpassed their records in 2012 with 22 straight wins, although not against major stakes competition). His owner, Calumet Farm, had brought Citation back from his injury in 1950 with the intention of making him the first horse to earn $1 million, but he came up against the English import Noor, who defeated Citation four times (Citation carrying more weight in the first three encounters), in the Santa Anita Handicap at 1 1/4 miles, the San Juan Capistrano Handicap at 1 3/4 miles in world record time, the Forty Niners Handicap at 1 1/8 miles in track record time, and the Golden Gate Handicap.

In the latter event, Noor conceded weight to Citation and set a world record of 1:58 1/5 which stood as an American record on a dirt track until Spectacular Bid broke it 30 years later. Citation's times in these races would have also been records; he did not become a millionaire at age five solely because Noor ran faster than any horse in history up to that point. Citation himself set a world record in winning the Golden Gate Mile Handicap in 1:33 3/5 in a race that Noor sat out.

Citation was brought back by his owners one more time at age six in 1951 in an attempt to become the first racehorse to win a record one million dollars. After two third-place finishes, Citation finished out of the money for the first time in the Hollywood Premiere Handicap. After another loss in the Argonaut Handicap, he returned to form with victories in the Century Handicap, American Handicap, and Hollywood Gold Cup, winning over his stablemate, the mare Bewitch. He won $100,000 in the Gold Cup, the largest purse of his career; the victory put him over $1 million in career earnings, and he was then retired to stud.

== Stud record ==
As a sire at Calumet Farm, Citation produced a number of noteworthy offspring including the Hall of Fame filly Silver Spoon, Get Around (won $164,868), Guadalcanal (won $243,337), and 1956 Preakness Stakes winner Fabius.

While at stud at Calumet Farm, he was said to be afraid of owner Lucille P. Markey's Yorkshire Terrier, Timmy Tammy. The dog reportedly nipped at him on several occasions.

He died on August 8, 1970, at the age of 25 and was buried in the horse cemetery at Calumet Farm.

== Honors ==
In 1959, Citation was inducted into the National Museum of Racing and Hall of Fame.

In the Blood-Horse magazine ranking of the Top 100 U.S. Thoroughbred champions of the 20th Century, Citation was ranked #3.

Around the time of Citation's death, Jim Taylor, a marketing executive at Cessna Aircraft Company, convinced chairman Dwane Wallace to use Citation's name for the new business jet Cessna was designing. Cessna has continued to use the Citation name and trademark horseshoe logo for an entire series of jet aircraft that comprise the Cessna Citation family.

A famous statue of Citation can be found at Hialeah Park. This statue is shown in The Godfather Part II as Michael Corleone travels to Miami to visit Hyman Roth.

In 2020, as part of a fundraiser for emergency relief efforts due to the COVID-19 pandemic, a "virtual Kentucky Derby" was held wherein the field included all 13 Triple Crown winners. Citation finished second (placed) to Secretariat.

== Pedigree ==
Pedigree of Citation (USA) Bay h. 1945
| Sire Bull Lea (USA) 1935 | Bull Dog (FR) | Teddy (FR) | Ajax (FR) |
| Sire Bull Lea (USA) 1935 | Bull Dog (FR) | Teddy (FR) | Rondeau (GB) |
| Sire Bull Lea (USA) 1935 | Bull Dog (FR) | Plucky Liege (GB) | Spearmint (GB) |
| Sire Bull Lea (USA) 1935 | Bull Dog (FR) | Plucky Liege (GB) | Concertina (GB) |
| Sire Bull Lea (USA) 1935 | Rose Leaves (USA) | Ballot (USA) | Voter (GB) |
| Sire Bull Lea (USA) 1935 | Rose Leaves (USA) | Ballot (USA) | Cerito (GB) |
| Sire Bull Lea (USA) 1935 | Rose Leaves (USA) | Colonial (GB) | Trenton (NZ) |
| Sire Bull Lea (USA) 1935 | Rose Leaves (USA) | Colonial (GB) | Thankful Blossom (GB) |
| Dam Hydroplane (GB) 1938 | Hyperion (GB) | Gainsborough (GB) | Bayardo (GB) |
| Dam Hydroplane (GB) 1938 | Hyperion (GB) | Gainsborough (GB) | Rosedrop (GB) |
| Dam Hydroplane (GB) 1938 | Hyperion (GB) | Selene (GB) | Chaucer (GB) |
| Dam Hydroplane (GB) 1938 | Hyperion (GB) | Selene (GB) | Serenissima (GB) |
| Dam Hydroplane (GB) 1938 | Toboggan (GB) | Hurry On (GB) | Marcovil (GB) |
| Dam Hydroplane (GB) 1938 | Toboggan (GB) | Hurry On (GB) | Tout Suite (GB) |
| Dam Hydroplane (GB) 1938 | Toboggan (GB) | Glacier (GB) | St. Simon (GB) |
| Dam Hydroplane (GB) 1938 | Toboggan (GB) | Glacier (GB) | Glasalt (GB) (family 3-l) |

== See also ==
- List of leading Thoroughbred racehorses
- List of racehorses
