= Bull Lea =

American-bred Thoroughbred racehorse

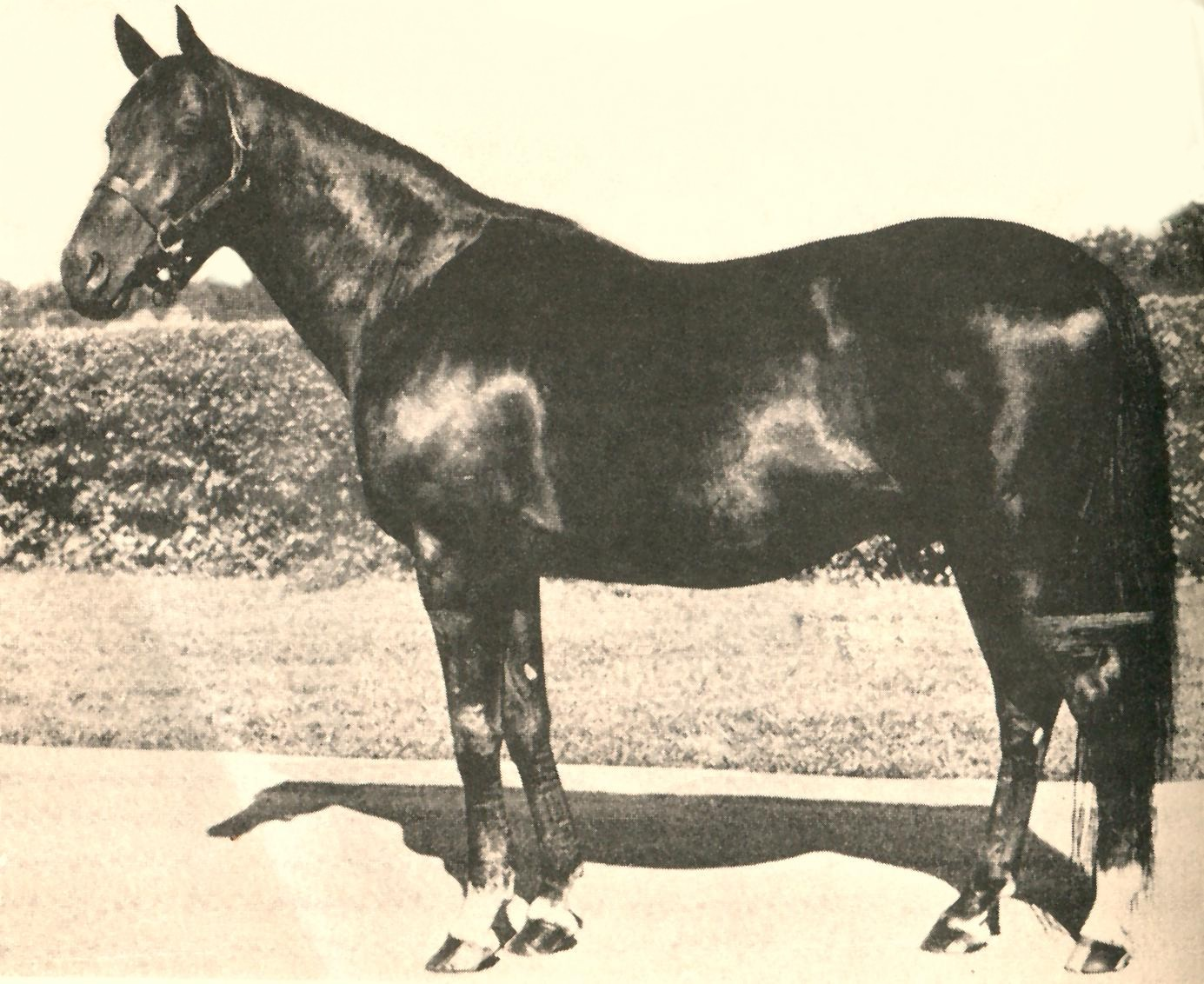
- Sire: Bull Dog
- Grandsire: Teddy
- Dam: Rose Leaves
- Damsire: Ballot
- Sex: Stallion
- Foaled: March 11, 1935
- Died: June 16, 1964 (aged 29)
- Country: United States
- Colour: Brown
- Breeder: Coldstream Farm
- Owner: Calumet Farm
- Trainer: Frank J. Kearns
- Record: 27: 10–7–3
- Earnings: $94,825

Major wins
- Blue Grass Stakes (1938); Kenner Stakes (1938); Widener Handicap (1939)

Awards
- Leading sire in North America (1947, 1948, 1949, 1952, 1953); Leading broodmare sire in North America (1958, 1959, 1960, 1961)

Bull Lea (March 11, 1935 – June 16, 1964) was an American Thoroughbred racehorse who is best known as the foundation sire responsible for making Calumet Farm one of the most successful racing stables in American history. In their article on Calumet Farm, the International Museum of the Horse in Lexington, Kentucky wrote that Bull Lea was "one of the greatest sires in Thoroughbred breeding history."

== Background ==
Bred by E. Dale Schaffer's Coldstream Stud in Lexington, Kentucky, Bull Lea was sired by Bull Dog and out of the mare Rose Leaves by Ballot. He was purchased as a yearling for $14,000 by Calumet Farm's Warren Wright, Sr. and sent to race at age two under trainer Frank J. Kearns.

== Racing career ==
Bull Lea make nine starts at age two, earning two wins, two seconds and two third-place finishes. The highlights were his runner-up performances in both the 1937 Hopeful and Champagne Stakes, two important races for his age group.

At age three, Bull Lea recorded seven wins from sixteen starts. He set a new Keeneland Race Course record for nine furlongs in winning the 1938 Blue Grass Stakes. Made a 3:1 second choice by bettors for the Kentucky Derby, he finished eighth and then ran sixth in the Preakness Stakes.

The following year, the four-year-old's most important win came in the Widener Handicap.

== Stud record ==
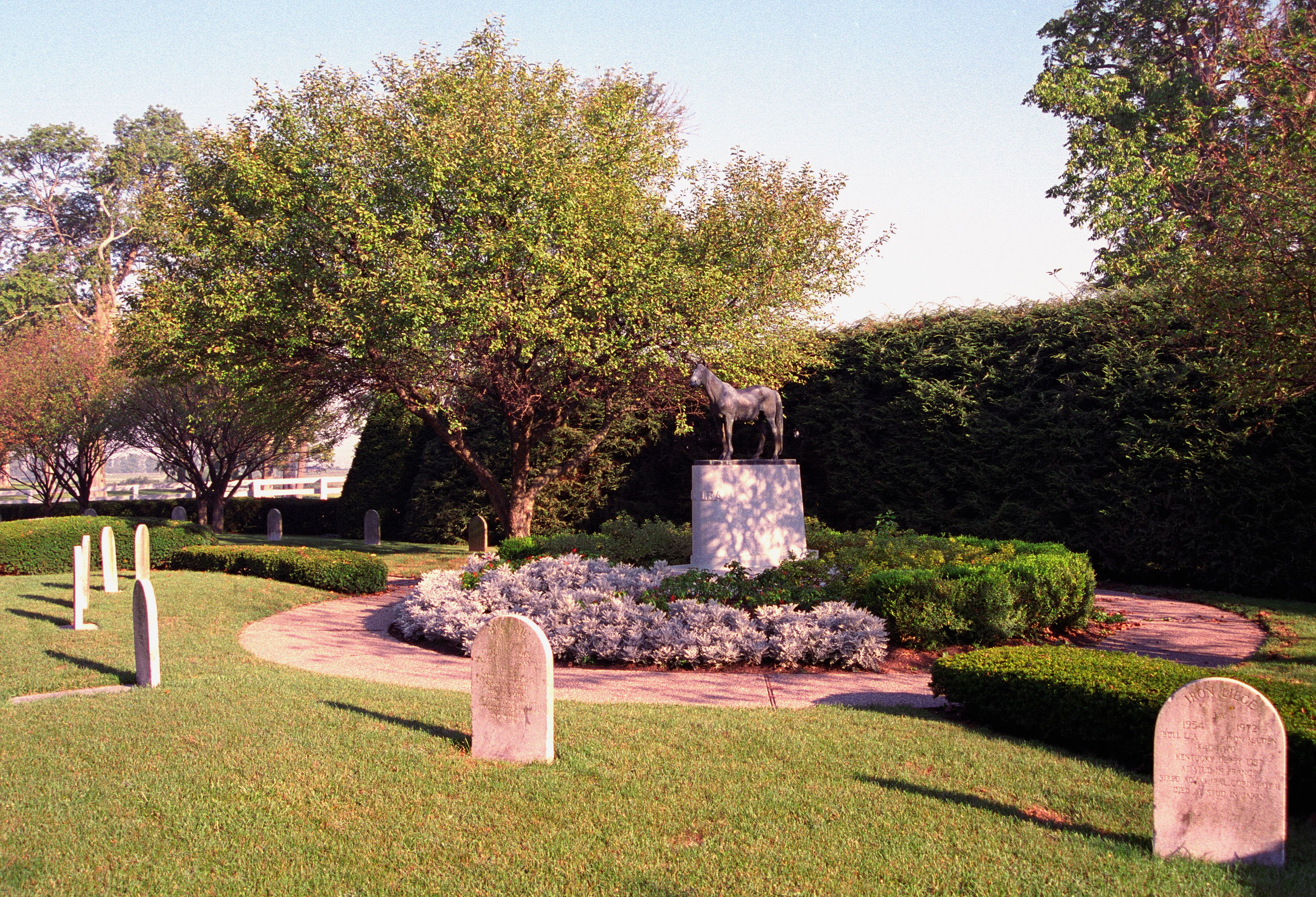
Grave of Bull Lea at Calumet Farm, surrounded by the graves of racehorses he sired; those of Hill Gail and Iron Liege are visible in the foreground.

Bull Lea entered stud in 1940 at Calumet Farm's operation in Lexington, Kentucky. He was the Leading sire in North America for 1947, 1948, 1949, 1952 and 1953. He also was Leading broodmare sire from 1958 to 1961. He was also the first sire in the history of American Thoroughbred horse racing to have offspring with earnings of more than $1 million in a single season.

Bull Lea sired fifty-eight stakes winners, seven of which are Hall of Fame members. His progeny includes:

- Armed (1941–1964): $817,475, U.S. Racing Hall of Fame inductee; 1947 U.S. Horse of the Year
- Twilight Tear (1941–1954): United States Racing Hall of Fame inductee; in 1944 she became the first filly to be voted U.S. Horse of the Year honors
- Faultless (1944): won 1947 Flamingo, Withers and Blue Grass Stakes plus the American Classic, the Preakness Stakes
- Bewitch (1945–1959): $462,605, United States' Racing Hall of Fame inductee; 1947 U.S. Champion 2-Yr-Old Filly; 1949 U.S. Champion Older Female Horse
- Citation (1945–1970): $1,085,760, United States Racing Hall of Fame inductee; 1947 U.S. Champion 2-Yr-Old Colt; 1948 U.S. Triple Crown Champion, 1948 U.S. Horse of the Year; rated #3 - Top 100 U.S. Racehorses of the 20th Century
- Coaltown (1945–1965): $415,676, United States Racing Hall of Fame inductee; 1948 U.S. Champion Sprint Horse; 1949 Handicap Horse of the Year; 1949 Co-United States Horse of the Year; rated #47 - Top 100 U.S. Racehorses of the 20th Century
- Two Lea (1946–1973): United States' Racing Hall of Fame inductee, 1949 Co-Champion 3-Yr-Old Filly, 1950 U.S. Champion Older Female Horse
- Bull Page (1947): Canadian Horse Racing Hall of Fame inductee; 1951 Canadian Horse Of The Year
- Next Move (1947–1968): 1950 Champion 3-Yr-Old Filly; 1951 U.S. Champion Older Female Horse
- Hill Gail (1949–1968): won 1952 Santa Anita Derby, Kentucky Derby
- Mark-Ye-Well (1949–1970): multiple stakes winner including the Arlington Classic, American Derby, Lawrence Realization Stakes, Santa Anita Handicap
- Real Delight (1949–1969): 1952 Champion 3-Yr-Old Filly; 1952 U.S. Co-Champion Older Female Horse
- Gen. Duke (1954–1958): won Everglades Stakes, Florida Derby, Fountain of Youth Stakes
- Iron Liege (1954–1972): won 1957 Kentucky Derby

Damsire of:

- Tim Tam (1955–1982): United States' Racing Hall of Fame inductee, won 1958 Kentucky Derby and Preakness Stakes
- Idun (1955): 1957 U.S. Champion 2-Yr-Old Filly; 1958 U.S. Champion 3-Yr-Old Filly
- Gate Dancer (1981–1998): won 1984 Preakness Stakes

Grandsire of:

- Fabius (1953): won Preakness Stakes
- Silver Spoon (1956–1978): United States Racing Hall of Fame inductee; 1959 U.S. Co-Champion 3-Yr-Old Filly
- New Providence (1956–1981): Canadian Horse Racing Hall of Fame inductee; Canadian Triple Crown Champion
- Flaming Page (1959) : Canadian Horse Racing Hall of Fame inductee; won 1962 Queen's Plate; dam of English Triple Crown Champion, Nijinsky

Bull Lea died on June 16, 1964, aged 29, at Calumet Farm and is buried there with a statue overlooking his grave.

== Pedigree ==
Pedigree of Bull Lea, 1935
Sire Bull Dog	Teddy	Ajax	Flying Fox
Sire Bull Dog	Teddy	Ajax	Amie
Sire Bull Dog	Teddy	Rondeau	Bay Ronald
Sire Bull Dog	Teddy	Rondeau	Doremi
Sire Bull Dog	Plucky Liege	Spearmint	Carbine
Sire Bull Dog	Plucky Liege	Spearmint	Maid of the Mint
Sire Bull Dog	Plucky Liege	Concertina	St. Simon
Sire Bull Dog	Plucky Liege	Concertina	Comic Song
Dam Rose Leaves	Ballot	Voter	Friar's Balsam
Dam Rose Leaves	Ballot	Voter	Mavourneen
Dam Rose Leaves	Ballot	Cerito	Lowland Chief
Dam Rose Leaves	Ballot	Cerito	Merry Dance
Dam Rose Leaves	Colonial	Trenton	Musket
Dam Rose Leaves	Colonial	Trenton	Frailty
Dam Rose Leaves	Colonial	Thankful Blossom	Paradox
Dam Rose Leaves	Colonial	Thankful Blossom	The Apple (family 9-f)
