= Twilight Tear =

American-bred Thoroughbred racehorse

- Sire: Bull Lea
- Grandsire: Bull Dog
- Dam: Lady Lark
- Damsire: Blue Larkspur
- Sex: Filly
- Foaled: 1941
- Country: United States
- Colour: Bay
- Breeder: Calumet Farm
- Owner: Calumet Farm
- Trainer: Ben A. Jones
- Record: 24: 18-2-2
- Earnings: $ 202,165

Major wins
- Arlington Lassie Stakes (1943); Acorn Stakes (1944); Coaching Club American Oaks (1944); Black-Eyed Susan Stakes (1944); Pimlico Special (1944); Arlington Classic (1944)

Awards
- TSD U.S. Champion 2-Yr-Old Filly (1943); U.S. Champion 3-Yr-Old Filly (1944); U.S. Champion Older Mare (1944); United States Horse of the Year (1944)

Honours
- United States Racing Hall of Fame (1963) #59 - Top 100 U.S. Racehorses of the 20th Century
- Last updated on October 8, 2006

Twilight Tear (1941–1954) was an American Hall of Fame Thoroughbred racehorse. At age two, she won four of her six starts, finishing second and third in her other two starts. Her performances earned her the title of 2-year-old filly honors in a poll by Turf and Sports Digest magazine. The rival Daily Racing Form award was won by Durazna.

At three, Twilight Tear won fourteen out of seventeen races including eleven straight, beating both fillies and colts. In the prestigious Pimlico Special she defeated Devil Diver and Kentucky Derby and Preakness Stakes winner Pensive in a time that matched the record set by Seabiscuit in the 1938 race. Her dominating performance in 1944 saw her named Horse of the Year by both the Daily Racing Form and the Turf and Sport Digest. In the latter poll she received 121 of the possible 154 votes, with the second-placed Pavot receiving 20.

In her first race at age four, Twilight Tear suffered respiratory tract problems and was retired to stand as a broodmare at Calumet Farm.

In a poll among members of the American Trainers Association, conducted in 1955 by Delaware Park, she was voted the second greatest filly in American racing history. (Gallorette was voted first.)

== Pedigree ==
Pedigree of Twilight Tear, bay mare, 1941
Sire Bull Lea	Bull Dog	Teddy	Ajax
Sire Bull Lea	Bull Dog	Teddy	Rondeau
Sire Bull Lea	Bull Dog	Plucky Liege	Spearmint
Sire Bull Lea	Bull Dog	Plucky Liege	Concertina
Sire Bull Lea	Rose Leaves	Ballot	Voter
Sire Bull Lea	Rose Leaves	Ballot	Cerito
Sire Bull Lea	Rose Leaves	Colonial	Trenton
Sire Bull Lea	Rose Leaves	Colonial	Thankful Blossom
Dam Lady Lark	Blue Larkspur	Black Servant	Black Toney
Dam Lady Lark	Blue Larkspur	Black Servant	Padula
Dam Lady Lark	Blue Larkspur	Blossom Time	North Star
Dam Lady Lark	Blue Larkspur	Blossom Time	Vaila
Dam Lady Lark	Ladana	Lucullite	Trap Rock
Dam Lady Lark	Ladana	Lucullite	Lucky Lass
Dam Lady Lark	Ladana	Adana	Adam
Dam Lady Lark	Ladana	Adana	Mannie Gray (family: 23-b)
