= Bull Dog (horse) =

French-bred Thoroughbred racehorse

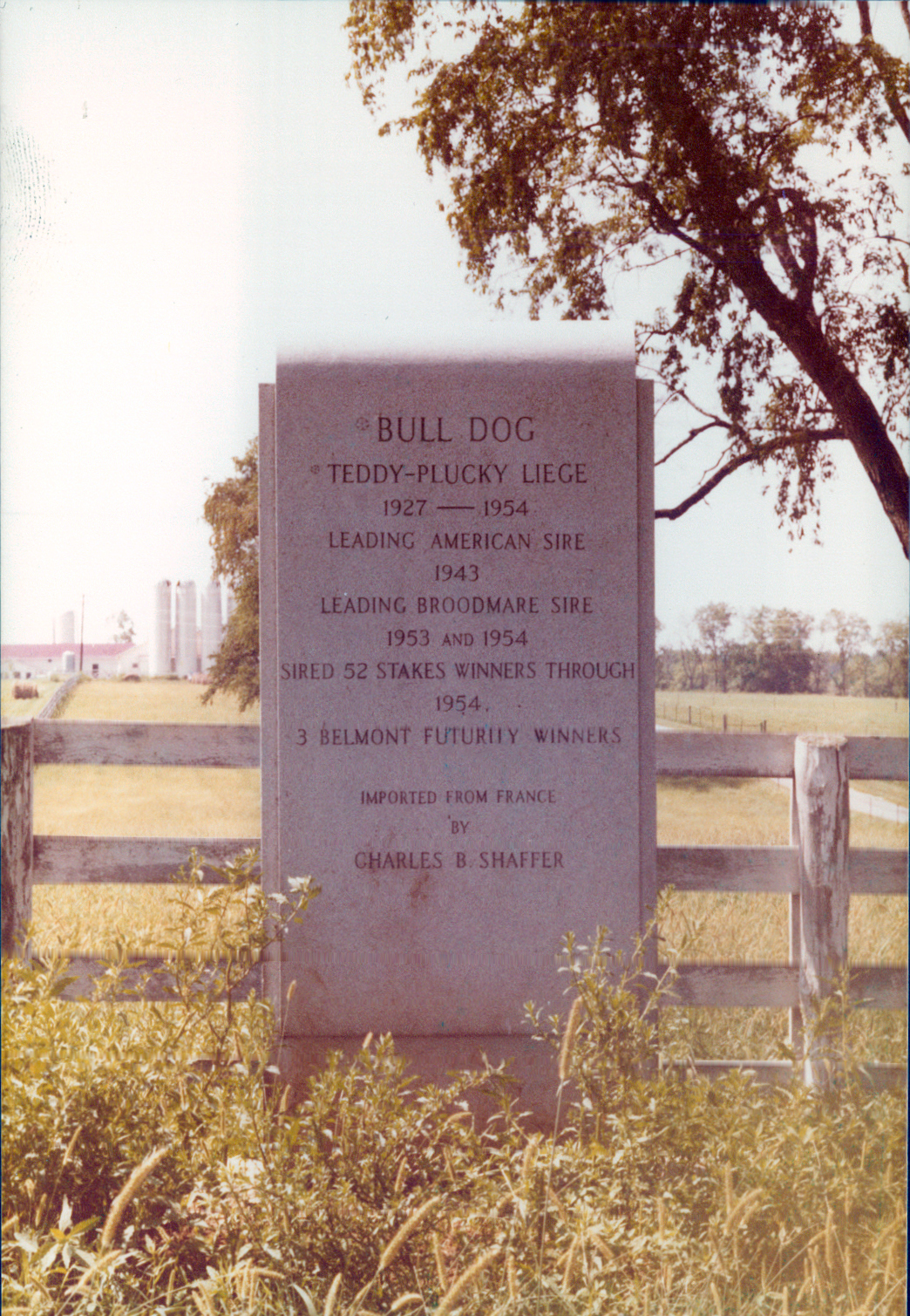
- Bull Dog's burial place at Coldstream Farm
- Sire: Teddy
- Grandsire: Ajax
- Dam: Plucky Liege
- Damsire: Spearmint
- Sex: Stallion
- Foaled: 1927
- Country: France
- Colour: Dark Bay
- Breeder: Capt. Jefferson Davis Cohn
- Owner: Capt. Jefferson Davis Cohn
- Trainer: Robert Denman
- Record: 8: 2-1-0
- Earnings: $7,802

Major wins
- Prix Daphnis (1930); Prix La Flèche d'Or (1930)

Awards
- Leading sire in North America (1943); Leading broodmare sire in North America (1953, 1954, 1956)

Bull Dog (1927–1954) was a French Thoroughbred racehorse who became a North American Champion sire and Champion broodmare sire.

== Background ==
Bull Dog was by American Jefferson Davis Cohn at his Haras du Bois-Roussel in Alençon in France's Lower Normandy region, and raced for him as a homebred. Bull Dog was sired by Teddy, who had been the Leading sire in France in 1923. His dam was Plucky Liege, one of the most important broodmares of the 20th century. Bull Dog was a full brother to Sir Gallahad, who won the Poule d'Essai des Poulains and became a leading sire in North America. Plucky Liege also produced two other colts, Bois Roussel and Admiral Drake, who went on to sire classic winners in Europe. Plucky Liege was sired by Spearmint, a winner of the two most prestigious races in England and France in 1906, The Derby and the Grand Prix de Paris.

Bull Dog was trained by the highly successful Staffordshire-born trainer, Robert Denman,

== Racing career ==
At age two Bull Dog earned a second-place finish in the important Prix Robert Papin at Maisons-Laffitte Racecourse. As a three-year-old he won the 1930 Prix Daphnis and the Prix La Flèche d'Or, but it was his performance off the racetrack for which he is best remembered.

== As a sire ==
Bull Dog's full brother Sir Gallahad was imported to the United States and became an extremely important Champion sire and Champion broodmare sire in North America. Because of his immediate success, American E. Dale Schaffer purchased Bull Dog in late 1930 and brought him to the United States too stand at his Coldstream Stud in Lexington, Kentucky.

At stud, Bull Dog became the Leading sire in North America in 1943 and the Leading broodmare sire in North America in 1953, 1954, and 1956. Bull Dog died at Coldstream Stud in 1954 having sired horses that would win 52 stakes races. His most significant son was Bull Lea, a very influential sire for Kentucky's renowned Calumet Farm whose sons included the 1948 U.S. Triple Crown champion, Citation.

== Pedigree ==
Pedigree of Bull Dog, bay or brown stallion, 1927
Sire Teddy b. 1913	Ajax b. 1901	Flying Fox b. 1896	Orme
Sire Teddy b. 1913	Ajax b. 1901	Flying Fox b. 1896	Vampire
Sire Teddy b. 1913	Ajax b. 1901	Amie b. 1893	Clamart
Sire Teddy b. 1913	Ajax b. 1901	Amie b. 1893	Alice
Sire Teddy b. 1913	Rondeau b. 1900	Bay Ronald b. 1893	Hampton
Sire Teddy b. 1913	Rondeau b. 1900	Bay Ronald b. 1893	Black Duchess
Sire Teddy b. 1913	Rondeau b. 1900	Doremi ch. 1894	Bend Or
Sire Teddy b. 1913	Rondeau b. 1900	Doremi ch. 1894	Lady Emily
Dam Plucky Liege b. 1912	Spearmint b. 1903	Carbine b. 1885	Musket
Dam Plucky Liege b. 1912	Spearmint b. 1903	Carbine b. 1885	Mersey
Dam Plucky Liege b. 1912	Spearmint b. 1903	Maid of the Mint b. 1897	Minting
Dam Plucky Liege b. 1912	Spearmint b. 1903	Maid of the Mint b. 1897	Warble
Dam Plucky Liege b. 1912	Concertina b. 1896	St. Simon b. 1881	Galopin
Dam Plucky Liege b. 1912	Concertina b. 1896	St. Simon b. 1881	St. Angela
Dam Plucky Liege b. 1912	Concertina b. 1896	Comic Song b. 1884	Petrarch
Dam Plucky Liege b. 1912	Concertina b. 1896	Comic Song b. 1884	Frivolity (family 16-a)

Note: b. = Bay, ch. = Chestnut
