= Lawson Products =

U.S. industrial distributor specializing in MRO supplies

Lawson Products, Inc.
- Company type: Public
- Traded as: Nasdaq: DSGR
- Industry: Industrial distribution, MRO supplies
- Founded: 1952
- Founder: Sidney L. Port
- Headquarters: Chicago, Illinois, U.S.
- Parent: Distribution Solutions Group, Inc.
- Website: lawsonproducts.com

Lawson Products, Inc. (now operating as part of Distribution Solutions Group) is an American industrial distributor specializing in maintenance, repair, and operations (MRO) supplies. The company provides products, inventory management services, and technical support to industrial, commercial, institutional, and government customers across North America.

== History ==
Lawson Products was founded in 1952 by Sidney L. Port in Chicago, Illinois. Port named the business after Victor Lawson, owner of the Chicago Daily News and a philanthropist whom Mr. Port admired. Lawson Products' success was built not on Mr. Port's knowledge of its inventory, but on his knack for judging people.

== Operations and business model ==
Lawson Products distributes industrial specialty products and supplies to customers in the maintenance, repair, and operations sector. It serves clients across the United States, Canada, Mexico, and the Caribbean.
