= Distribution Solutions Group =

Specialty distribution company in industrial and technology sectors

Distribution Solutions Group, Inc.
- Company type: Public
- Traded as: Nasdaq: DSGR
- Industry: Specialty distribution, MRO, industrial technologies
- Founded: 1952
- Headquarters: Fort Worth, Texas, U.S.
- Area served: United States, Canada, internationally
- Key people: J. Bryan King (Chairman & CEO)
- Number of employees: ~4,300
- Subsidiaries: Lawson Products, TestEquity, Gexpro Services
- Website: distributionsolutionsgroup.com

Distribution Solutions Group, Inc. (DSG), trading as DSGR on NASDAQ, is a multi-platform specialty distribution company serving Maintenance, Repair, and Operations (MRO), Original Equipment Manufacturer (OEM), and industrial technologies markets. DSG was formed through the strategic combination of Lawson Products, TestEquity, and Gexpro Services.

== History ==
Lawson Products, Inc., an established MRO distributor, changed its corporate name to Distribution Solutions Group, Inc. in May 2022 to reflect its expanded scope across multiple specialty distribution platforms. The ticker symbol was changed from LAWS to DSGR.

DSG's formation integrated three primary operating companies: - Lawson Products, a longstanding distributor of specialty MRO / C-parts - TestEquity, a distributor in test & measurement and electronic components - Gexpro Services, a supply chain and OEM services provider

== Operations and business model ==
DSG operates with a decentralized operating model, allowing each of its platform companies (Lawson, TestEquity, and Gexpro) to maintain its specialized expertise while leveraging shared infrastructure, best practices, and collective scale.

DSG offers value-added distribution services, including product sourcing, inventory management, logistics, technical support, and supply chain solutions aimed at reducing customers' total cost of operation.

DSG serves a broad customer base — the company reported serving approximately 190,000 customers supported by ~4,300 employees and strong vendor relationships.

Digital commerce and automation are increasingly central to DSG's strategic growth, with investments in platforms that enhance order visibility, automation, and customer experience.

== Segments and brands ==
According to public profiles, DSG operates through multiple segments: - Lawson: Specialty MRO products and services for industrial, commercial, institutional, and government customers. - TestEquity: Distributes test and measurement equipment, industrial production supplies, vendor-managed inventory programs, and fabrication/adhesive services under brands like TestEquity, Techni-Tool, Jensen Tools, and more. - Gexpro Services: Provides OEM supply chain solutions, VMI, kitting, logistics, value engineering, and quality/aftermarket services. - Canada Branch Division: Distributes industrial MRO supplies, safety products, fasteners, power tools, and value-added services to the Canadian market.

== Financial performance ==
DSG's public disclosures show that the company has grown through both organic expansion and acquisitions.

In recent quarters, DSG reported notable revenue growth (e.g., Q1 2025 revenue increasing ~14.9% year over year).

== Corporate governance and leadership ==
DSG is headquartered in Fort Worth, Texas.

Its executive leadership includes: - J. Bryan King, Chairman & CEO - Ronald J. Knutson, EVP & CFO

== Recognition, strategy, and market position ==
DSG positions itself as a high-touch specialty distributor that aims to differentiate through product expertise, technical support, and logistics capabilities.

DSG has stated that it intends to expand its digital capabilities and e-commerce systems to enable B2B customers.

== See also ==
- Lawson Products
- TestEquity
- Gexpro Services
