= Tidal Handicap =

- Class: Discontinued
- Location: Belmont Park, Elmont, New York; United States
- Inaugurated: 1964
- Final run: 1993
- Race type: Thoroughbred - Flat racing

Race information
- Distance: 1 3/8 miles
- Surface: Turf
- Track: Left-handed
- Qualification: Three years old and older
- Purse: US$100,000

The Tidal Handicap was an American Thoroughbred horse race on turf run from 1964 through 1993. A race for horses age three and older, it was inaugurated on July 18, 1964, at Aqueduct Racetrack in Ozone Park, Queens, New York. It remained there through 1974 after which it was transferred to Belmont Park in Elmont, New York.

From inception, the Tidal Handicap was run in late June or early July until 1991 when it was moved to a run date in mid-October.

The Tidal Handicap was the third of Belmont Park's four major summer grass races for older horses. The unofficial series began with the Red Smith Handicap (G2) in early June, followed by the Bowling Green Handicap (G1) in mid-June, and finished with the Sword Dancer Handicap (G1) at the end of July.

== History ==
The 1964 inaugural running at Aqueduct Racetrack was won by Master Dennis under jockey Fernando Alvarez for future U.S. Racing Hall of Fame trainer Burley Parke and owner Harbor View Farm, the stable that in 1978 would win the U.S. Triple Crown series.

The 1966 winner Assagai went on to be voted that year's American Champion Male Turf Horse.

Fort Marcy, a multiple National Champion runner, including 1970 American Horse of the Year honors, and a future Hall of Fame inductee for the Rokeby Stables of Paul Mellon, became the first horse to win the Tidal Handicap more than once. He did it for the first time in 1967 on a soft Aqueduct course with future Canadian and U.S. Hall of Fame jockey Ron Turcotte aboard. Carrying high weight, Fort Marcy won it for the second time in 1969 and again over a course soft enough that it resulted in a very slow winning time. This time his jockey was Manny Yacaza, another future Hall of Fame inductee. In the winner's circle, legendary Big Band leader Duke Ellington presented a trophy to each of Fort Marcy's team made up of owner Paul Mellon, one of only five people made an Exemplar of Racing, jockey Ycaza and trainer J. Elliott Burch, a future Hall of Fame inductee and a son and grandson of Hall of Fame trainers.

William Haggin Perry's Tiller would be the only other horse to win the Tidal Handicap twice. Trained by David Whiteley, Tiller came into the July 2, 1978 Tidal Handicap having broken the Belmont Park turf course record with a time of 2:13 flat for the mile and three-eighths in the June 17 Bowling Green Handicap. Tiller was ridden in that race by future Canadian Hall of Fame jockey Jeffrey Fell who was also aboard for his win in the Tidal Handicap. Tiller got his second win in the Tidal in 1980 under jockey Ruben Hernandez.

Trainer Jose Martin, son of U.S. Hall of Fame trainer Pancho Martin of Sham fame, got his first stakes win in a New York Racing Association event when he won the 1973 Tidal Handicap with Jogging.

Noble Dancer broke the Belmont Park course record in winning the 1977 Tidal Handicap. He was ridden by Steve Cauthen whose win was his first ever in a race on grass. A future U.S. Hall of Fame inductee, in 1978 Cauthen would win the U.S. Triple Crown aboard Affirmed.

In 1984, the Tidal Handicap was won by a horse named Win. The race was run over the Belmont Park dirt track after rainy weather resulted in track officials determining the turf course to be unsafe. Trained by Sally Bailie, Win apparently liked the dirt as he beat the closest horse to him by 11 lengths.

The Tidal Handicap of 1986 was won by Darby Dan Farm's Proud Truth. In 1985 Proud Truth had won the Breeders' Cup Classic.

With Approval came into the 1990 Tidal Handicap as the prior year's Canadian Triple Crown winner and Canada's Horse of the Year. The future Canadian Hall of Fame inductee did not disappoint, getting an easy win. Reporting on his performance, the New York Times said "With Approval confirmed his standing as the best grass horse in the East this year."

When last run on 18 October 1993 the event held Grade 2 classification.

== Records ==
Speed record:

- 2:12.23 @ 1-3/8 miles : With Approval (1990)
- 1:51.60 @ 1-3/16 miles : Run the Gantlet (1971)
- 1:47.60 @ 1-1/8 miles: More Scents (1968)

Most wins:

- 2 - Fort Marcy (1967, 1969)
- 2 - Tiller (1978, 1980)

Most wins by a jockey:

- 4 - Angel Cordero Jr. (1968, 1973, 1981, 1985)

Most wins by a trainer:

- 4 - MacKenzie Miller (1966, 1970, 1974, 1987)
- 4 - J. Elliott Burch (1967, 1969, 1971, 1983)

Most wins by an owner:

- 4 - Rokeby Stables (1967, 1969, 1971, 1987)

== Winners ==
Year	Winner	Age	Jockey	Trainer	Owner	Dist. (miles)	Time	Grade	Win $
1993	Mio Robertino	4	Walter Guerra	Nicholas Zito	Robert Perez	1-3/8 m	2:17.82	$71,280	G2
1992	Revasser	3	Thierry Jarnet	Andre Fabre	Juddmonte Farms	1-3/8 m	2:14.52	$74,280	G2
1991	Passagere du Soir	4	Mike E. Smith	Andre Fabre	Paul de Moussac	1-3/8 m	2:15.30	$74,760	G2
1990	With Approval	4	Craig Perret	Roger Attfield	Kinghaven Farms	1-3/8 m	2:12.23	$52,560	G2
1989	Three Engines	4	Jean-Luc Samyn	Michael J. Kelly	Adele L. Rand	1-3/8 m	2:15.67	$72,840	G2
1988	Glaros	6	Robbie Davis	Thomas Skiffington Jr.	Mandysland Farm (Richard Eamer)	1-3/8 m	2:16.40	$103,140	G2
1987	Dance of Life	4	Randy Romero	MacKenzie Miller	Rokeby Stables	1-3/8 m	2:16.00	$105,840	G2
1986	Proud Truth	4	Jorge Velasquez	John M. Veitch	Darby Dan Farm	1-3/8 m	2:13.00		G2
1985	Who's For Dinner	6	Angel Cordero Jr.	Jan H. Nerud	Tartan Stable	1-3/8 m	2:15.40	$89,460	G2
1984	Win †	4	Antonio Graell	Sally A. Bailie	Sally A. Bailie, Frederick Ephraim, Paul Cornman	1-3/8 m	2:18.60	$73,200	G2
1983	Hush Dear	5	Jean-Luc Samyn	J. Elliott Burch	Cornelius Vanderbilt Whitney	1-3/8 m	2:12.80		G2
1982	Nijinsky's Secret	4	Jeffrey Fell	William J. Hirsch Jr.	Hedley McDougald	1-3/8 m	2:12.60		G2
1981	Masked Marvel	5	Angel Cordero Jr.	Angel Penna Sr.	Wildenstein Stable	1-3/8 m	2:13.20	$34,980	G2
1980	Tiller	6	Ruben Hernandez	David A. Whiteley	William Haggin Perry	1-3/8 m	2:12.80	$34,200	G2
1979	Golden Reserve	5	Jean-Luc Samyn	Michael Kay	G. Watts Humphrey	1-3/8 m	2:13.20	$33,150	G2
1978	Tiller	4	Jeffrey Fell	David A. Whiteley	William Haggin Perry	1-3/8 m	2:13.00		G2
1977	Noble Dancer	5	Steve Cauthen	Thomas J. Kelly	Spring Hill Stable (Haakon Fretheim)	1 3/8 m	2:12.60		G2
1976	Erwin Boy	5	Ron Turcotte	James P. Conway	Sea High Stable (Erwin Finsterwald & Fred Baum)	1-3/8 m	2:16.00	$35,100	G2
1975	Brigand	4	Heliodoro Gustines	Leonard Imperio	Nelson Bunker Hunt	1-3/8 m	2:13.80	$34,950	G2
1974	Halo	5	Jorge Velasquez	MacKenzie Miller	Cragwood Stable	1-3/16 m	1:55.00	$35,310	G2
1973	Jogging	6	Angel Cordero Jr.	Jose A. Martin	Phillip Wise	1-3/16 m	1:53.40	$34,920	G2
1972	Droll Role	4	Eddie Maple	Thomas J. Kelly	John M. Schiff	1-3/16 m	1:54.00	$35,460	
1971	Run The Gantlet	3	Robert Woodhouse	J. Elliott Burch	Rokeby Stables	1 3/16 m	1:51.60	$36,600	
1970	Mr. Leader	4	Chuck Baltazar	MacKenzie Miller	Cragwood Stable	1-1/8 m	1:49.80	$40,040	
1969	Fort Marcy	5	Manuel Ycaza	J. Elliott Burch	Rokeby Stables	1-1/8 m	1:55.20	$37,895	
1968	More Scents	4	Angel Cordero Jr.	Philip G. Johnson	Meadowhill Stable (Morton Rosenthal & Alfred Green)	1-1/8 m	1:47.60	$38,220	
1967	Fort Marcy	3	Ron Turcotte	J. Elliott Burch	Rokeby Stables	1-1/8 m	1:52.20	$37,365	
1966	Assagai	3	Larry Adams	MacKenzie Miller	Charles W. Engelhard Jr.	1-1/8 m	1:49.00	$38,805	
1965	Or et Argent	4	Robert Ussery	Wayne Stucki	Colin Campbell	1-1/8 m	1:49.40	$38,155	
1964	Master Dennis	4	Fernando Alvarez	Burley Parke	Harbor View Farm	1-1/8 m	1:49.00	$18,785	

- † Run on the main dirt track.
