= Fort Marcy Stakes =

American horse race

- Class: Grade III
- Location: Belmont Park; Elmont, New York, United States
- Inaugurated: 1975 (as Fort Marcy Handicap)
- Race type: Thoroughbred – Flat racing
- Website: www.nyra.com

Race information
- Distance: 1 1/8 miles (9 furlongs)
- Surface: Turf
- Track: Left-handed
- Qualification: Three-year-olds & older
- Weight: 124 lbs. with allowances
- Purse: $200,000 (2021)

The Fort Marcy Stakes is a Grade III American Thoroughbred horse race for three-years-old and older run over a distance of 1 1/8 miles on the turf annually in early May at Belmont Park, in Elmont, New York. The event currently offers a purse of $200,000 added.

== History ==
It was initially known as the Fort Marcy Handicap but was renamed to the Fort Marcy Stakes beginning with its 2009 running.

The race is named for the U.S. Racing Hall of Fame horse, Fort Marcy.

Inaugurated on 31 August 1975, the event was run at Belmont Park a distance of seven furlongs. It was run in two divisions that year as well as in 1978, 1981, and 1987. The event was not held in 1976 and 1977.

In 1980, the Fort Marcy Handicap was restricted to horses, age four and older. The event was hosted by Belmont Park in 1981, 1987, 1988 and since 2009. In 1998 and 2003, bad weather resulted in the race being contested on the dirt track at a distance of one mile (8 furlongs).

From 2014 the race has been run at 1 1/8 miles on the Inner Turf track.

In 2020 the event was upgraded to Grade II.

In 2024 the event was moved to Aqueduct Racetrack due to infield tunnel and redevelopment work at Belmont Park.

== Records ==
Speed record:

- 1 1/8 miles – 1:45.70 Deterministic (2025) (new track record)
- 1 1/16 miles – 1:40.88 Spindrift (2000)

Margins:

- 8 lengths – Subordination (1998)

Most wins:

- 2 – Adam Smith (1993, 1994)
- 2 - Deterministic (2025, 2026)

Most wins by an owner:

- 3 – Hobeau Farm (1975, 1983, 2004)
- 3 – Rokeby Stable (1981, 1984, 1987)
- 3 – Madaket Stables, (2019, 2021, 2022)

Most wins by a jockey:

- 3 – José A. Santos (1986, 1988, 1995)
- 3 – Jean-Luc Samyn (1993, 1997, 2000)
- 3 – Eric Cancel (2017, 2021, 2022)
- 3 - Kendrick Carmouche (2019, 2025, 2026)

Most wins by a trainer:

- 6 – Chad C. Brown (2015, 2018, 2019, 2020, 2021, 2022)

== Winners ==
Year	Winner	Age	Jockey	Trainer	Owner	Distance	Time	Purse	Grade	Ref
At Aqueduct – Fort Marcy Stakes
2026	Deterministic	5	Kendrick Carmouche	Miguel Clement	St. Elias Stable, Ken Langone, Steven C. Duncker & Vicarage Stable	1 1/8 miles	1:48.44	$169,750	III	
2025	Deterministic	4	Kendrick Carmouche	Christophe Clement	St. Elias Stable, Ken Langone, Steven C. Duncker & Vicarage Stable	1 1/8 miles	1:45.70	$194,000	II	
2024	Master Piece (CHI)	8	Dylan Davis	Richard E. Dutrow Jr.	Michael & Julia C. Iavarone, Nicholas Zoumas & Frank Argano	1 1/8 miles	1:48.68	$194,000	II	
At Belmont Park
2023	Ottoman Empire (GB)	4	Richard Mullen	Charlie Appleby	Godolphin	abt. 1 1/8 miles	1:47.25	$200,000	II	
2022	L'Imperator (FR)	5	Eric Cancel	Chad C. Brown	Madaket Stables, Wonder Stables, & Robert V. LaPenta	abt. 1 1/8 miles	1:59.72	$200,000	II	
2021	Tribhuvan (FR)	5	Eric Cancel	Chad C. Brown	Michael Dubb, Madaket Stables, Wonder Stables & Michael J. Caruso	1 1/8 miles	1:46.11	$194,000	II	
2020	Instilled Regard	5	Irad Ortiz Jr.	Chad C. Brown	OXO Equine	1 1/8 miles	1:47.07	$150,000	II	
2019	Olympico (FR)	4	Kendrick Carmouche	Chad C. Brown	Michael Dubb, Madaket Stables, Wonder Stables, Bethlehem Stables	1 1/8 miles	1:53.92	$150,000	III	
2018	Robert Bruce (CHI)	4	Tyler Gaffalione	Chad C. Brown	Convento Viejo	1 1/8 miles	1:47.56	$150,000	III	
2017	Smooth Daddy	6	Eric Cancel	Thomas Albertrani	Robert Baker & William Mack	1 1/8 miles	1:52.64	$147,000	III	
2016	Ironicus	5	José L. Ortiz	Claude R. McGaughey III	Stuart S. Janney III	1 1/8 miles	1:50.82	$150,000	III	
2015	Big Blue Kitten	7	Joe Bravo	Chad C. Brown	Kenneth and Sarah Ramsey	1 1/8 miles	1:47.97	$150,000	III	
2014	Five Iron	4	Michael J. Luzzi	Brian A. Lynch	Frederick Michael Allor	1 1/8 miles	1:48.30	$150,000	III	
2013	Lubash	5	Junior Alvarado	Christophe Clement	Aliyu Ben J Stables	1 1/16 miles	1:38.89	$150,000	III	
2012	Boisterous	4	Alan Garcia	Claude R. McGaughey III	Phipps Stable	1 1/16 miles	1:44.89	$150,000	III	
2011	Straight Story	5	Carlos H. Marquez Jr.	Alan E. Goldberg	Richard Santulli	1 1/16 miles	1:41.84	$98,000	III	
2010	Baletti	6	Cornelio H. Velasquez	Angel A. Penna Jr.	Castletop Stable	1 1/16 miles	1:40.36	$100,000	III	
2009	Cosmonaut	7	Jose Lezcano	Philip M. Serpe	Flying Zee Stable	1 1/16 miles	1:42.00	$106,500	III	
At Aqueduct – Fort Marcy Handicap
2008	Silver Tree	8	Edgar S. Prado	William I. Mott	Peter Vegso	1 1/16 miles	1:42.07	$110,600	III	
2007	Woodlander	5	Alan Garcia	Gary C. Contessa	Winning Move Stable & Martin J. Minnella	1 1/16 miles	1:44.88	$114,100	III	
2006	Foreverness	7	Eibar Coa	Gregory D. Sacco	Red Oak Stable	1 1/16 miles	1:42.99	$109,000	III	
2005	Better Talk Now	6	Ramon A. Dominguez	H. Graham Motion	Bushwood Stables	1 1/16 miles	1:42.74	$107,400	III	
2004	Chilly Rooster	4	Shannon Uske	H. Allen Jerkens	Hobeau Farm	1 1/16 miles	1:42.47	$111,400	III	
2003	Saint Verre	5	Jose L. Espinoza	H. Allen Jerkens	H. Joseph Allen	1 mile	1:33.77	$117,500	III	
2002	Pyrus	4	Edgar S. Prado	W. Elliott Walden	Jubilee Stable & Peter R. Bradley III	1 1/16 miles	1:44.53	$112,100	III	
2001	Strategic Mission	6	Richard Migliore	William I. Mott	Live Oak Plantation	1 1/16 miles	1:41.62	$112,900	III	
2000	Spindrift (IRE)	5	Jean-Luc Samyn	Kiaran P. McLaughlin	Rashid Al Maktoum	1 1/16 miles	1:40.88	$112,800	III	
1999	Wised Up	4	Michael J. Luzzi	Richard A. DeStasio	Wayne R. Ewald	1 1/16 miles	1:45.03	$116,100	III	
1998	Subordination	4	Jorge F. Chavez	Gary Sciacca	Klaravich Stables	1 mile	1:35.24	$112,700	III	
1997	Influent	6	Jean-Luc Samyn	Howard M. Tesher	Turfnpaddock Farm	1 1/16 miles	1:42.59	$112,400	III	
1996	Warning Glance	5	Mike E. Smith	Claude R. McGaughey III	Stuart S. Janney III	1 1/16 miles	1:42.48	$85,750	III	
1995	Fourstars Allstar	7	José A. Santos	Leo O'Brien	Richard M. Bomze	1 1/16 miles	1:41.69	$83,751	III	
1994	Adam Smith (GB)	6	Mike E. Smith	Christophe Clement	Gordon White	1 1/16 miles	1:42.49	$82,750	III	
1993	Adam Smith (GB)	5	Jean-Luc Samyn	Christophe Clement	Gordon White	1 1/16 miles	1:42.30	$92,100	III	
1992	Maxigroom	4	Julie Krone	Thomas J. Skiffington	John T. L. Jones Jr.	1 1/16 miles	1:42.66	$89,100	III	
1991	Stage Colony	4	Craig Perret	Ross R. Pearce	Buckland Farm	1 1/16 miles	1:42.38	$91,050	III	
1990	Crystal Moment	5	Santos Noe Chavez	Ronald B. Houghton	Shirley N. Lathrop	1 1/16 miles	1:43.40	$88,350	III	
1989	Arlene's Valentine	4	Julie Krone	Daniel Perlsweig	Arlene London	1 1/16 miles	1:50.20	$88,200	III	
At Belmont Park
1988	Equalize	6	José A. Santos	Angel Penna Sr.	Alejandro Menditeguy	1 1/16 miles	1:42.60	$126,400	III	
1987	Dance of Life	4	Randy Romero	MacKenzie Miller	Rokeby Stable	1 1/16 miles	1:45.00	$117,900	III	Division 1
1987	Glaros (FR)	5	Eddie Maple	Thomas J. Skiffington	Mandysland Farm	1 1/16 miles	1:45.00	$119,500	III	Division 2
At Aqueduct
1986	Onyxly	5	José A. Santos	John P. Campo	Luck Si Si Stable	1 1/16 miles	1:42.20	$93,150	III	
1985	Forzando (GB)	4	Jorge Velásquez	John Sullivan	Sherwood C. Chillingworth	1 1/16 miles	1:46.00	$90,300	III	
1984	Hero's Honor	4	Jerry D. Bailey	MacKenzie Miller	Rokeby Stable	1 1/16 miles	1:43.60	$90,450	III	
1983	†John's Gold	4	Antonio Graell	H. Allen Jerkens	Hobeau Farm	1 1/16 miles	1:47.40	$61,000	III	
1982	Folge	4	Jorge Velásquez	Michael Kay	Barbara Rosenthal	1 1/16 miles	1:42.80	$60,100	III	
At Belmont Park
1981	Masked Marvel (IRE)	4	Ramon I. Encinas	Angel Penna Sr.	Rokeby Stable	1 1/16 miles	1:46.00	$55,500	III	Division 1
1981	Key to Content	5	Jeffrey Fell	MacKenzie Miller	Wildenstein Stable	1 1/16 miles	1:44.80	$55,100	III	Division 2
At Aqueduct
1980	Sten	5	Cash Asmussen	Richard T. DeStasio	Michael Berry	1 1/16 miles	1:44.00	$59,100	III	
1979	Uncle Pokey (GB)	5	Jean Cruguet	Jerome C. Meyer	Dogwood Stable	1 1/16 miles	1:45.60	$54,830		
1978	True Colors	4	Eddie Maple	Willard C. Freeman	William Haggin Perry	1 1/16 miles	1:41.80	$42,350		Division 1
1978	Tiller	4	Jeffrey Fell	David A. Whiteley	Robert Billips	1 1/16 miles	1:42.20	$42,350		Division 2
1976–1977		Race not held								
At Belmont Park
1975	Apollo Nine	8	Mike Venezia	Ronald Warren	Audley Farm Stable	7 furlongs	1:23.00	$41,050		Division 1
1975	Beau Bugle	5	Jean Cruguet	H. Allen Jerkens	Hobeau Farm	7 furlongs	1:22.40	$40,850		Division 2

Legend:
Turf Dirt
Notes:
† Ran as an entry

== See also ==
List of American and Canadian Graded races
