= Bernard Baruch Stakes =

- Class: Listed
- Location: Saratoga Race Course; Saratoga Springs, New York, United States
- Inaugurated: 1959
- Race type: Thoroughbred – Flat racing
- Website: NYRA

Race information
- Distance: 1 1/16 miles (8 1/2 furlongs)
- Surface: Turf
- Track: Left-handed
- Qualification: Three years old and older
- Weight: 124 lbs with allowances
- Purse: US$200,000 (2026)

The Bernard Baruch Stakes is a Listed American Thoroughbred horse race for three-years-old and older run over a distance of 1 1/16 miles on the turf annually in early August at Saratoga Race Course in Saratoga Springs, New York. The event was a graded stakes race from 1973 to 2022 and currently offers a purse of $200,000.

== History ==
The event is named in honor of Bernard Baruch who was a statesman, an adviser to various Presidents of the United States, and a lover of horses, thoroughbred horse racing, and the life of America's racetracks.

The inaugural running of the event was on 12 August 1959 as the Bernard Baruch Stakes for three year old horses over a distance of 1 1/8 miles on the dirt and was won by Middle Brother, ridden by Bobby Ussery defeating Howard B. Keck's Bagdad by a neck in a time of 1:49 flat setting a new track record. The event was again held for three year old horses in 1960, but in 1961 the event was moved to the turf.

During the early runnings, the event would have many more nominations than would allow to start in one race forcing Saratoga's administration to either disallow acceptance or splitting the event into two divisions. This happened seven times with the event split into divisions in 1967, 1968, 1969, 1970, 1972, 1973, 1981 and 1983.

The event was classified as Grade III in 1973 with it being upgraded to Grade II in 1983. For two runnings the event was Grade I, in 1988 and 1989 before returning to Grade II in 1990.

In 1975, there was a dead heat for first place between Salt Marsh and War McAllister.

In 1979, the race was switched to dirt due to weather conditions.

In the 1960s the event attracted many high calibre horses. Of these who won the event were crowned US Champion Male Turf Horse. This includes the 1966 winner Assagai, 1967 Division 2 winner Fort Marcy and the South African bred champion Hawaii in 1969.

The event even in today's Breeders' Cup era continues to attract horses who have run in this race. The 2005 winner Artie Schiller went on to win the Breeders' Cup Mile later in the year, while the 2013 US Horse of the Year, Wise Dan won the 2014 event by a nose as an odds-on favorite.

In 2022 the event was downgraded by the Thoroughbred Owners and Breeders Association to Grade III status and once again in 2023 to Listed status.

== Records ==
Speed record:

- 1 1/16 miles: 1:38.29 – Ring Weekend (2016)
- 1 1/8 miles: 1:45.33 – Shakis (2007)

Margins:

- 5 lengths – Steinlen (GB) (1989)

Most wins:

- 2 – Red Reality (1971, 1973)
- 2 – Win (1984, 1985)
- 2 – Fourstars Allstar (1992, 1995)
- 2 – Hap (2000, 2001)
- 2 – Shakis (2007, 2008)
- 2 - Qurbaan (2018, 2019)

Most wins by an owner:

- 6 – Cragwood Stables (1966, 1969 (2), 1971, 1973 (2))

Most wins by a jockey:

- 7 – Jerry Bailey (1983, 1993, 1998, 2000, 2001, 2002, 2004)

Most wins by a trainer:

- 7 – MacKenzie Miller (1966, 1969 (2), 1971, 1973 (2), 1990)

== Winners ==
Year	Winner	Age	Jockey	Trainer	Owner	Distance	Time	Purse	Grade	Ref
Bernard Baruch Stakes
2026	Kupuna	7	Ricardo Santana Jr.	Norm W. Casse	Flying P Stable	1 1/16 miles	1:41.73	$200,000	Listed	
2025	Donegal Momentum	4	Irad Ortiz Jr.	Thomas Morley	Donegal Racing	1 1/16 miles	1:43.05	$145,500	Listed	
2024	Running Bee	4	Irad Ortiz Jr.	Chad C. Brown	Calumet Farm	1 1/16 miles	1:41.86	$150,000	Listed	
2023	Pioneering Spirit	4	Jose Lezcano	Linda L. Rice	A. Bianco Holding Ltd.	1 1/16 miles	1:40.69	$145,500	Listed	
Bernard Baruch Handicap
2022	Emaraaty (GB)	7	Flavien Prat	Chad C. Brown	Michael Dubb, Michael J. Caruso & Madaket Stables	1 1/16 miles	1:41.36	$200,000	III	
2021	Tell Your Daddy	5	John R. Velazquez	Thomas Morley	Flying P Stable	1 1/16 miles	1:44.61	$186,000	II	
2020	Somelikeithotbrown	4	Tyler Gaffalione	Michael J. Maker	Skychai Racing LLC & David Koenig	1 1/16 miles	1:41.32	$150,000	II	
2019	Qurbaan	6	Joel Rosario	Kiaran P. McLaughlin	Shadwell Stable	1 1/16 miles	1:45.20	$250,000	II	
2018	Qurbaan	5	Irad Ortiz Jr.	Kiaran P. McLaughlin	Shadwell Stable	1 1/16 miles	1:40.00	$243,000	II	
2017	Heart to Heart	6	Irad Ortiz Jr.	Brian A. Lynch	Terry Hamilton	1 1/16 miles	1:42.45	$250,000	II	
2016	Ring Weekend	5	John R. Velazquez	H. Graham Motion	St. Elias Stable & West Point Thoroughbreds	1 1/16 miles	1:38.29	$250,000	II	
2015	Ironicus	4	Javier Castellano	Claude R. McGaughey III	Stuart S. Janney III	1 1/16 miles	1:38.54	$250,000	II	
2014	Wise Dan	7	John R. Velazquez	Charles LoPresti	Morton Fink	1 1/16 miles	1:39.08	$250,000	II	
2013	Silver Max	4	Robby Albarado	Dale L. Romans	Mark Bacon & Dana Wells	1 1/16 miles	1:42.31	$245,000	II	
2012	Dominus	4	Julien R. Leparoux	Todd A. Pletcher	George Bolton, Stonestreet Stables & Spendthrift Farm	1 1/16 miles	1:40.32	$250,000	II	
2011	Turallure	4	Julien R. Leparoux	Charles LoPresti	Donna C. Arnold	1 1/8 miles	1:48.75	$202,000	II	
2010	Get Stormy	4	Javier Castellano	Thomas M. Bush	Sullimar Stable	1 1/8 miles	1:46.70	$200,000	II	
2009	Justenuffhumor	4	Alan Garcia	Kiaran P. McLaughlin	Darley Stable	1 1/8 miles	1:47.38	$200,000	II	
2008	Shakis (IRE)	8	Alan Garcia	Kiaran P. McLaughlin	Shadwell Racing	1 1/8 miles	1:46.78	$200,000	II	
2007	Shakis (IRE)	7	Alan Garcia	Kiaran P. McLaughlin	Shadwell Racing	1 1/8 miles	1:45.33	$200,000	II	
2006	§ Ashkal Way (IRE)	4	Garrett K. Gomez	Saeed bin Suroor	Godolphin Racing	1 1/8 miles	1:46.78	$200,000	II	
2005	Artie Schiller	4	Richard Migliore	James A. Jerkens	Timber Bay Farm & Mrs. Thomas J. Walsh	1 1/8 miles	1:47.70	$147,000	II	
2004	Silver Tree	4	Jerry D. Bailey	William I. Mott	Peter Vegso	1 1/8 miles	1:49.60	$150,000	II	
2003	Trademark (SAF)	7	Richard Migliore	Kiaran P. McLaughlin	Mohammed bin Rashid Al Maktoum	1 1/8 miles	1:49.00	$150,000	II	
2002	Del Mar Show	5	Jerry D. Bailey	William I. Mott	Allen E. Paulson Trust	1 1/8 miles	1:48.40	$150,000	II	
2001	Hap	5	Jerry D. Bailey	William I. Mott	Edward White & Michael Paulson	1 1/8 miles	1:47.00	$150,000	II	
2000	Hap	4	Jerry D. Bailey	William I. Mott	Edward White & Michael Paulson	1 1/8 miles	1:45.80	$150,000	II	
1999	Middlesex Drive	4	Shane Sellers	Philip M. Hauswald	C. Steven Duncker	1 1/8 miles	1:46.40	$150,000	II	
1998	Yagli	5	Jerry D. Bailey	William I. Mott	Allen E. Paulson	1 1/8 miles	1:46.20	$142,300	II	
1997	Sentimental Moi	7	Christopher P. DeCarlo	William Badgett Jr.	C. Landon Knight	1 1/8 miles	1:46.00	$110,800	II	
1996	Volochine (IRE)	5	Pat Day	Niall M. O'Callaghan	Stonerside Stable	1 1/8 miles	1:47.40	$114,500	II	
1995	Fourstars Allstar	7	José A. Santos	Leo O'Brien	Richard M. Bomze	1 1/8 miles	1:47.60	$110,400	II	
1994	Lure	5	Mike E. Smith	Claude R. McGaughey III	Claiborne Farm	1 1/8 miles	1:46.00	$108,200	II	
1993	Furiously	4	Jerry D. Bailey	Claude R. McGaughey III	Mill House Stable	1 1/8 miles	1:45.40	$117,200	II	
1992	Fourstars Allstar	4	Mike E. Smith	Leo O'Brien	Richard M. Bomze	1 1/8 miles	1:46.00	$117,800	II	
1991	Double Booked	6	Art Madrid Jr.	Linda L. Rice	Robert Gorham	1 1/8 miles	1:49.00	$119,000	II	
1990	Who's to Pay	4	Jean-Luc Samyn	MacKenzie Miller	Rokeby Stable	1 1/8 miles	1:48.40	$88,200	II	
1989	Steinlen (GB)	6	José A. Santos	D. Wayne Lukas	Wildenstein Stable	1 1/8 miles	1:51.00	$123,200	I	
1988	My Big Boy	5	Randy Romero	Claude R. McGaughey III	Heidi Doubleday	1 1/8 miles	1:46.80	$121,000	I	
1987	Talakeno	7	Ángel Cordero Jr.	Richard E. Dutrow Sr.	Happy Valley Farm	1 1/8 miles	1:47.40	$119,800	II	
1986	Exclusive Partner	4	Jorge Velásquez	Thomas M. Bush	Paul Cornman	1 1/8 miles	1:50.80	$135,400	II	
1985	Win	5	Richard Migliore	Sally A. Bailie	Fredrick Ephraim	1 1/8 miles	1:47.00	$99,000	II	
1984	Win	4	Antonio Graell	Sally A. Bailie	Fredrick Ephraim	1 1/8 miles	1:47.40	$95,850	II	
1983	Tantalizing	5	Jerry D. Bailey	Angel Penna Sr.	Ogden Mills Phipps	1 1/8 miles	1:48.40	$56,900	II	Division 1
1983	Fray Star (ARG)	4	Octavio A. Vergara	John Parisella	Theodore M. Sabarese	1 1/8 miles	1:48.80	$57,300	II	Division 2
1982	Pair of Deuces	4	Ruben Hernandez	Luis Barrera	Happy Valley Farm	1 1/8 miles	1:47.80	$60,500	III	
1981	Native Courier	6	Eddie Maple	Sidney J. Watters Jr.	Stephen C. Clark Jr.	1 1/8 miles	1:47.40	$55,750	III	Division 1
1981	Great Neck	5	Ángel Cordero Jr.	Jan H. Nerud	Tartan Stable	1 1/8 miles	1:47.60	$56,150	III	Division 2
1980	Premier Ministre	4	Ramon I. Encinas	Angel Penna Sr.	Wildenstein Stable	1 3/8 miles	2:13.60	$59,500	III	
1979	Overskate	4	Robin Platts	Gil H. Rowntree	John H. Stafford	1 1/8 miles	1:51.80	$59,350	III	
1978	Dominion (GB)	6	Jean-Luc Samyn	James H. Iselin	Dogwood Stable	1 1/8 miles	1:49.00	$40,800	III	
1977	Majestic Light	4	Sandy Hawley	John W. Russell	Ogden Mills Phipps	1 1/8 miles	1:46.20	$38,625	III	
1976	Intrepid Hero	4	Eddie Maple	John W. Russell	Ogden Mills Phipps	1 1/8 miles	1:50.40	$37,550	III	
1975	Salt Marsh	5	Eddie Maple	Thomas J. Kelly	Brookmeade Stable	1 1/8 miles	1:49.80	$44,050	III	Dead heat
1975	War McAllister	4	Daryl Montoya	John W. Russell	Ogden Phipps	1 1/8 miles	1:49.80	$44,050	III	Dead heat
1974	Golden Don	4	Vincent Bracciale Jr.	Kay E. Jensen	Archie Donaldson	1 1/8 miles	1:46.00	$39,300	III	
1973	Tentam	4	Jorge Velásquez	MacKenzie Miller	Cragwood Stables	1 1/8 miles	1:45.40	$23,775	III	Division 1
1973	Red Reality	7	Jorge Velásquez	MacKenzie Miller	Cragwood Stables	1 1/8 miles	1:46.60	$23,775		Division 2
1972	Scrimshaw	4	Robert Woodhouse	Robert P. Lake	Alfred G. Vanderbilt II	1 1/8 miles	1:46.40	$23,800		Division 1
1972	Chrisaway	4	Robert Howard	Paul R. Fout	Beverly Steinman	1 1/8 miles	1:46.20	$23,925		Division 2
1971	Red Reality	5	Jorge Velásquez	MacKenzie Miller	Cragwood Stables	1 1/16 miles	1:42.20	$35,300		
1970	Big Shot II (ARG)	5	Ángel Cordero Jr.	Thomas M. Walsh	Chance Hill Farm	1 1/16 miles	1:39.40	$24,000		Division 1
1970	Bailar	5	Ángel Cordero Jr.	Sidney J. Watters Jr.	Stephen C. Clark Jr.	1 1/16 miles	1:39.80	$24,250		Division 2
1969	Larceny Kid	3	Laffit Pincay Jr.	MacKenzie Miller	Cragwood Stables	1 1/16 miles	1:41.00	$23,500		Division 1
1969	Hawaii (SAF)	5	Manuel Ycaza	MacKenzie Miller	Cragwood Stables	1 1/16 miles	1:42.00	$23,300		Division 2
1968	Go Marching	3	Larry Adams	Horatio Luro	Warner L. Jones Jr.	1 1/16 miles	1:42.40	$23,125		Division 1
1968	More Scents	4	Ángel Cordero Jr.	Philip G. Johnson	Meadowhill	1 1/16 miles	1:42.60	$23,275		Division 2
1967	Flit-To	4	Hedley Woodhouse	Robert L. Wheeler	Robert E. Lehman	1 1/16 miles	1:40.40	$23,000		Division 1
1967	Fort Marcy	3	Ron Turcotte	J. Elliott Burch	Rokeby Stable	1 1/16 miles	1:40.40	$23,000		Division 2
1966	Assagai	3	Larry Adams	MacKenzie Miller	Cragwood Stables	1 1/16 miles	1:40.00	$30,600		
1965	Quick Pitch	5	Jimmy Combest	E. Barry Ryan	Fortune P. Ryan	1 1/16 miles	1:42.60	$29,750		
1964	Western Warrior	5	Bobby Ussery	John A. Nerud	Tartan Stable	1 1/16 miles	1:42.40	$30,750		
1963	Endymion	4	Mike Sorrentino	Sylvester Veitch	George D. Widener Jr.	1 1/16 miles	1:45.80	$29,200		
1962	Hitting Away	4	Hedley Woodhouse	James Fitzsimmons	Ogden Phipps	1 1/16 miles	1:42.80	$28,850		
1961	Shield Bearer	6	Manuel Ycaza	Sidney J. Watters Jr.	Mrs. Stephen C. Clark	1 1/8 miles	1:47.00	$29,200		
1960	Tompion	3	Manuel Ycaza	Robert L. Wheeler	Cornelius Vanderbilt Whitney	1 1/8 miles	1:50.00	$28,350		3YO only
Bernard Baruch Stakes
1959	Middle Brother	3	Bobby Ussery	E. Barry Ryan	Mrs. E. Barry Ryan	1 1/8 miles	1:49.00	$28,650		3YO only

Legend:
Turf Dirt

== See also ==
List of American and Canadian Graded races
