= Tiller (horse) =

Thoroughbred racehorse

- Sire: Herbager
- Grandsire: Vandale
- Dam: Chappaquiddick
- Damsire: Relic
- Sex: Gelding
- Foaled: 14 April 1974
- Country: United States
- Colour: Chestnut
- Breeder: Claiborne Farm
- Owner: William Haggin Perry
- Trainer: David A. Whiteley
- Record: 40: 16-7-6
- Earnings: $867,988

Major wins
- Fort Marcy Handicap (1978); Edgemere Handicap (1978); Bowling Green Handicap (1978); Tidal Handicap (1978, 1980); San Marcos Handicap (1979); San Antonio Handicap (1979); San Juan Capistrano Handicap (1979); Sword Dancer Invitational Handicap (1980)

Tiller (foaled 14 April 1974) was an American thoroughbred racehorse. Racing mainly on turf he won sixteen of his forty races between February 1977 and September 1980. He was not a champion, but won many important races and defeated many of the best racehorses of his era including Exceller and John Henry.

He was unraced as a two-year-old and won three minor races as a three-year-old in 1977. In the following year he showed much-improved form, winning seven races including the Fort Marcy Handicap, Edgemere Handicap, Bowling Green Handicap and Tidal Handicap as well as finishing second in the Washington D C International. In 1979 he raced in California, winning the San Marcos Handicap and San Antonio Handicap on dirt and the San Juan Capistrano Handicap on turf. He also finished second to Affirmed in that year's Santa Anita Handicap.

As a six-year-old he won the Sword Dancer Invitational Handicap and a second Tidal Handicap before he sustained a career-ending injury in September.

== Background ==
Tiller was a chestnut gelding bred in Kentucky by Claiborne Farm. He was sired by the French stallion Herbager who won the Prix du Jockey Club and the Grand Prix de Saint-Cloud before his racing career was ended by injury. Herbager sired good winners in Europe, including Grey Dawn before being exported to the United States where the best of his other progeny included Big Spruce. Tiller's dam Chappaquiddick produced several other winners including Endear (Hempstead Handicap, Miss Grillo Stakes) who in turn produced the dual Breeders' Cup Mile winner Lure. During his racing career, the gelding was owned by William Haggin Perry and trained by David A. Whiteley.

== Racing career ==
=== 1977: three-year-old season ===
Tiller began his racing career at Aqueduct Racetrack in February winning a maiden race at his second attempt. In the summer on 1977 he won allowance races at Belmont Park in July and Monmouth Park in August. In autumn at Belmont he was moved up in class to finish fourth in both the Lawrence Realization Stakes and the Man o' War Stakes.

=== 1978: four-year-old season ===
As a four-year-old, Tiller emerged as a top-class turf performer. He began the year with four starts in Florida where he won one minor race and finished third to Noble Dancer and That's A Nice in the Hialeah Turf Cup. At Aqueduct in May he won an allowance race and then recorded his first major success as he defeated Noble Dancer in a division of the Fort Marcy Handicap. Tiiler won his next four races, all at Belmont, and being partnered on each occasion by the Canadian jockey Jeff Fell. In June he won the Grade III Edgemere Handicap and then beat Proud Arion in the Grade II Bowling Green Handicap with Bowl Game in third place. In the latter race he established a track record of 2:12.4 for eleven furlongs on turf. He took the Tidal Handicap in July, beating Proud Arion by five and three quarter lengths, to confirm his "domination of turf racing in the East". After a two-month break he returned to win an allowance in September. Tiller was beaten in his last four races of 1978, but was in the money against top-class opposition on each occasion. He finished third in the Manhattan Handicap and then finished second to the mare Waya in the Man o' War Stakes, with the three-year-old Mac Diarmida in third. He again finished second by a nose to Waya in the Turf Classic, with Trillion neck back in third place. He ended his season in the Washington D C International at Laurel Park Racecourse in November. Ridden by Fell he finished very strongly but failed by a head to catch Mac Diarmida.

=== 1979: five-year-old season ===
At the beginning of 1979, Tiller was sent to race in California and began his campaign by finishing third to Fluorescent Light in the San Gabriel Handicap at Santa Anita Park on January 1. His next race, the Grade III San Marcos Stakes three weeks later was scheduled to be run on Santa Anita's turf course but was switched to the main dirt track after heavy rain. Tiller won the race impressively, beating the Chilean-bred six-year-old Palton in track record time. In February, the gelding stayed on the dirt track to contest the Grade I San Antonio Handicap in which he was ridden by Angel Cordero. Starting favorite, he was last of the six runners before taking the lead in the straight and drawing away to win by three and a half lengths from Painted Wagon with the Haskell Invitational Stakes winner Life's Hope in third. He remained on dirt for the Santa Anita Handicap on March 4, and finished second to the Triple Crown winner Affirmed with Exceller in third place. Tiller returned to the turf two weeks later and finished second to Noble Dancer in the San Luis Rey Handicap. On his final Californian start on April 8, Tiller started at odds of 3/1 under a weight of 126 pounds for the San Juan Capistrano Handicap. Ridden by Cordero, he raced in the first five for most of the race before moving up on the outside to take the lead in the straight and got the best of a "battling finish" to win by three quarters of a length from Exceller and three quarters length to Noble Dancer in third. The gelding then returned to the East coast and won an allowance at Belmont in June, but his subsequent form was less impressive. He ran unplaced in the Suburban Handicap and the Brooklyn Handicap (both on dirt), finished third to Native Courier in the Grade III Brighton Beach Handicap, and ended his season by finishing second to Fluorescent Light in the Manhattan Handicap on September 23 with Noble Dancer finishing fourth in his career finale.

=== 1980: six-year-old season ===
After a break of more than eight months, Tiller returned to racing at Belmont and finished unplaced in allowance races in May and June. On June 29 however, he returned to winning form as he won the Tidal Handicap for a second time, beating Scythian Gold into second. On July 12 he was matched against the five-year-old gelding John Henry in the Sword Dancer Invitational Handicap at Belmont. He raced in third place as John Henry duelled for the lead with Marquee Universal before moving forward approaching the final turn. He overtook John Henry in the straight and won by a length and a quarter in a time of 2:25.4, two-fifths of a second outside Secretariat's course record. On his next appearance, the gelding finished third to Premier Ministre and Great Neck in the Bernard Baruch Handicap at Saratoga Race Course in August. On September 7 Tiller faced both John Henry and Premier Ministre in the Brighton Beach Handicap. At the 5/16 pole, Tiller broke his right hip while attempting to overtake the race leader John Henry, causing significant hemorrhaging. He was taken from the track in a horse ambulance. His trainer David Whiteley said, "We don't know what happened. Ruben (Hernandez) said he was not bumped. It was just one of those things that can happen in a race." Tiller was not euthanized immediately after the race and was able to put limited weight on the hip. Whiteley expressed interest in saving the horse, noting "He's one of my favorites."

== Assessment ==
In their book A Century of Champions, based on a modified version of the Timeform system, John Randall and Tony Morris rated Easton the one hundred and eighty-second best racehorse of twentieth century, the fifty-seventh best horse of the century to have been trained in the United States, and the third best horse foaled in 1974 after Seattle Slew and Alleged.

== Pedigree ==
Pedigree of Tiller (USA), chestnut gelding, 1974
Sire Herbager (FR) 1956	Vandale (FR); 1943	Plassy	Bosworth
Sire Herbager (FR) 1956	Vandale (FR); 1943	Plassy	Pladda
Sire Herbager (FR) 1956	Vandale (FR); 1943	Vanille	La Farina
Sire Herbager (FR) 1956	Vandale (FR); 1943	Vanille	Yaya
Sire Herbager (FR) 1956	Flagette (FR); 1951	Escamillo	Firdaussi*
Sire Herbager (FR) 1956	Flagette (FR); 1951	Escamillo	Estoril
Sire Herbager (FR) 1956	Flagette (FR); 1951	Fidgette	Firdaussi*
Sire Herbager (FR) 1956	Flagette (FR); 1951	Fidgette	Boxeuse
Dam Chappaquiddick (USA) 1968	Relic (USA); 1945	War Relic	Man o' War
Dam Chappaquiddick (USA) 1968	Relic (USA); 1945	War Relic	Friars Carse
Dam Chappaquiddick (USA) 1968	Relic (USA); 1945	Bridal Colors	Black Toney
Dam Chappaquiddick (USA) 1968	Relic (USA); 1945	Bridal Colors	Vaila
Dam Chappaquiddick (USA) 1968	Baby Doll (GB); 1956	Dante	Nearco
Dam Chappaquiddick (USA) 1968	Baby Doll (GB); 1956	Dante	Rosy Legend
Dam Chappaquiddick (USA) 1968	Baby Doll (GB); 1956	Bebe Grande	Niccolo dell'Arca
Dam Chappaquiddick (USA) 1968	Baby Doll (GB); 1956	Bebe Grande	Grande Corniche (Family:3-o)

* Tiller is inbred 4S x 4S to the stallion Firdaussi, meaning that he appears fourth generation twice on the sire side of his pedigree.
