= Run the Gantlet =

American-bred Thoroughbred racehorse

- Sire: Tom Rolfe
- Grandsire: Ribot
- Dam: First Feather
- Damsire: First Landing
- Sex: Stallion
- Foaled: 1968
- Country: United States
- Colour: Bay
- Breeder: Paul Mellon
- Owner: Rokeby Stables
- Trainer: J. Elliott Burch
- Record: 21: 9-4-3
- Earnings: US$559,079

Major wins
- Garden State Futurity (1970); Man o' War Stakes (1971); Tidal Handicap (1971); United Nations Handicap (1971); Washington, D.C. International Stakes (1971); Bowling Green Handicap (1972)

Awards
- American Champion Male Turf Horse (1971)

Run the Gantlet (1968–1986) was an American Champion Thoroughbred racehorse and noted sire.

== Background ==
He was out of the mare First Feather, whom owner Paul Mellon had purchased as a yearling at a then record price of $90,000 for a filly. He was sired by the 1965 Preakness Stakes winner, Tom Rolfe, a son of the undefeated European superstar, Ribot. Run the Gantlet is a descendant of Nearco through his damsire First Landing who was the U.S. Champion Two-Year-Old Colt of 1958.

== Racing career ==
Raced under Mellon's Rokeby Stables colors, Run the Gantlet was trained by future U.S. Racing Hall of Fame inductee, Elliott Burch. Sent to the track at age two, Run the Gantlet's most important win in 1970 came in the Garden State Futurity. As a three-year-old, Run the Gantlet excelled in races on turf. The colt won six of his ten starts in 1971, including five stakes in a row. He emerged from the shadow of his more famous stable companion Fort Marcy to win the United Nations Handicap. He capped off the year with a six-length win on a soggy Laurel Park Racecourse in the Washington, D.C. International Stakes. Run the Gantlet's 1971 performances earned him American Champion Male Turf Horse honors.

Run the Gantlet returned to race at age four in 1972, notably winning the Bowling Green Handicap at Belmont Park.

== Stud record ==
Retired to the Gilltown Stud in County Kildare, Ireland, Run the Gantlet was the sire of 39 stakes race winners, including outstanding runners such as:

- Ardross (foaled 1976), multiple Group One winner in England and France, including back-to-back wins of the Ascot Gold Cup
- Providential (1977), won in France and the United States including the 1979 Critérium de Saint-Cloud and the 1981 Washington, D.C. International Stakes
- April Run (1978), multiple Group One winner in France and the United States, two-time Champion in France (1981 & 1982) and American Champion Female Turf Horse (1982)
- Swiftfoot (1979), multiple stakes winner in England and Ireland including Irish Oaks
- Commanche Run (1981), multiple stakes winner in England and Ireland including the Group One Benson & Hedges Gold Cup, Irish Champion Stakes and the Classic St. Leger Stakes.
- Panamint (SAJC Adelaide Cup).

Run the Gantlet was also the damsire of Risk Me, winner of the 1987 Group One Grand Prix de Paris and Prix Jean Prat.

Run the Gantlet died at age 18 on February 28, 1986 at Jerry Hoffberger's breeding farm in Woodbine, Maryland.

== Sire line tree ==
- Run the Gantlet
  - Panamint
  - Ardross
    - Miocamen
    - Karinga Bay
      - Grave Doubts
      - Copsale Lad
      - Karanja
      - Shining Strand
      - Coneygree
    - Alderbrook
      - Baron Windrush
      - Ollie Magern
      - Sh Boom
    - Anzum
    - Young Kenny
    - Ackzo
  - Providential
    - Prorutori
  - Commanche Run
    - Bonny Scot
    - Wavy Run
    - Commanche Court
    - Timbera
