= Sunriver =

American-bred Thoroughbred racehorse

- Sire: Saint Ballado
- Grandsire: Halo
- Dam: Goulash
- Damsire: Mari's Book
- Sex: Stallion
- Foaled: March 17, 2003
- Country: United States (Kentucky)
- Colour: Dark brown, almost black
- Breeder: Jerry & Liz Squyres
- Owner: Aaron and Marie Jones
- Trainer: Todd A. Pletcher
- Record: 16: 6-3-3
- Earnings: $816,414

Major wins
- Peter Pan Stakes (2006); Bowling Green Handicap (2006); Hollywood Turf Cup Stakes (2007)
- Last updated on December 8, 2007

Sunriver (foaled March 17, 2003 in Kentucky, died 2009) was an American Thoroughbred race horse who was a contender for the Triple Crown in 2006.

== Connections ==
Sunriver was owned by Aaron and Marie Jones and trained by Todd Pletcher. Sunriver was bred in Kentucky by Jerry & Liz Squyres.

== Breeding ==
Sired by Saint Ballado, his dam was Goulash by Mari's Book, which made him a full brother to the 2004 Eclipse Award American Champion Three-Year-Old Filly, Ashado.

== Races ==
Finish	Race	Distance	Track	Condition
1st	Hollywood Turf Cup Stakes	12 furlongs	Hollywood Park	soft
2nd	Man o' War Stakes	One and three eighth miles	Belmont Park	?
1st	Bowling Green Handicap	One and three eighth miles	Belmont Park	?
3rd	Belmont Stakes	One and one/half miles	Belmont Park	?
1st	Peter Pan Stakes	9 furlongs	Belmont Park	?
3rd	Florida Derby	One and One-Eighth Miles	Gulfstream Park	Fast
1st	Allowance	One and One-Eighth Miles	Gulfstream Park	Fast
7th	Holy Bull Stakes	One and One-Eighth Miles	Gulfstream Park	Sloppy
2nd	Allowance	One and One-Eighth Miles	Gulfstream Park	Fast
1st	Maiden	One and One-Eighths Miles	Aqueduct Racetrack	Fast
2nd	Maiden	Six and One-Half Furlongs	Belmont Park	Fast

Sunriver died of a suspected heart attack in August 2009.
