= Hawaii (horse) =

South African-bred Thoroughbred racehorse

- Sire: Utrillo
- Grandsire: Toulouse Lautrec
- Dam: Ethane
- Damsire: Mehrali
- Sex: Stallion
- Foaled: 1964
- Country: South Africa
- Colour: Bay
- Breeder: A. L. Dell (Platberg Stud)
- Owner: Cragwood Stables
- Trainer: George Azzie (South Africa), MacKenzie Miller (USA)
- Record: 28: 21-2-3
- Earnings: US$371,292

Major wins
- East Rand Juvenile Stakes (1966); African Breeders' Plate (1966); Chairman's Handicap (1967); South African Guineas (1967); Royal Reserve Guineas (1967); Derby Trial Stakes (1967); Clairwood Winter Handicap (1967); Clairwood Anniversary Plate (1967); Cape Mellow-Wood Guineas (1967); Transvaal Spring Champion Stakes (1968); United Nations Handicap (1969); Man o' War Stakes (1969); Bernard Baruch Handicap (1969); Stars and Stripes Handicap (1969); Sunrise Handicap (1969)

Awards
- South African Champion Two-Year Old (1966/67); South African Champion Three-Year Old (1967/68); American Champion Turf Horse (1969)

Honours
- Aiken Thoroughbred Racing Hall of Fame (1977); Hawaii Stakes Grade 2 (1400m) Turffontein

Hawaii (1964–1990) was a South African-bred Thoroughbred racehorse who was a Champion at age two and three (Southern Hemisphere) in South Africa after which he was sent to race in the United States by owner Charles W. Engelhard, Jr. where he was voted the 1969 American Champion Turf Horse honors, upstaging Fort Marcy who was American Grass Champion or co-Champion in 1967, 1968 and 1970. Among his wins in the United States was a track record setting performance in the mile-and-a-half Man o' War Stakes on turf at Belmont Park. In South Africa he remains the only racehorse to have won all three Guineas staged in Durban, Cape Town and Johannesburg. The Hawaii Stakes (Grade 2) run over 7 furlongs every first Saturday of March at Turffontein Racecourse in Johannesburg, South Africa is named after him.

== Background ==
Hawaii was foaled at the Colesberg, South Africa stud, Platberg Stud, of the Dell Brothers in 1964. He was by the relatively unsuccessful stallion whose first crop he was from Utrillo out of the Mehrali mare Ethane. Ethane produced another great South African racehorse In 1961, William Penn, who raced from two to eleven years of age in South Africa. William Penn won 16 (23 places) of 58 starts including 12 stakes races. He won the 1964 South African Guineas and beat his younger sibling Hawaii in the 1968 Champion Stakes. William Penn also won the 1968 Cape Metropolitan Handicap, The Queens Plate and the Champion Stakes twice. Ethane was South African Broodmare of the Year in 1967. He was sold to Charles Englehard Jr at the 1966 National Yearling Sales in South Africa, for ZAR9030, picked for his owner by trainer George Azzie. He finished his racing career in South Africa in October 1968 and was shipped to the United States where he was trained by MacKenzie Miller. He made his first start in the US in June 1969.

== Racing career ==
Hawaii made his first start in December 1966 at Gosforth Park racecourse in Germiston South Africa and has his last start in November 1969 at Laurel Park in the United States. He record in South Africa (1966-1968) was 18 : 15-1-1 and in the United States (1969) was 10 : 6-1-2. His only unplaced efforts were in the 1968 Rothmans July Handicap in South Africa and his only start on dirt at Monmouth Park in June 1969. He set a course record in the 1969 Man o' War Stakes over 2400m. His record stood until 1973 when it was bested by Secretariat. He was champion in each year he raced in South African and was voted American Champion Turf Horse of 1969. He retired to stud in 1970.

== Tabulated race record ==
At 2	6 starts 5 wins 1 third R10 027 (South Africa)	1966/67
Won	Maiden Juvenile Plate (800m Gosforth Park) by 7 lengths	11/12/1966
Won	Pepsi Cola Cup (1165m Gosforth Park) by 8.5 lengths	12/26/1966
Won	East Rand Juvenile Handicap (1000m Gosforth Park) by 8 lengths in new course record 57.60s	01/28/1967
Won	African Breeders Plate (1200m Greyville) by 1.50 lengths	05/27/1967
3rd	Champion Nursery Stakes (1400m Greyville) beaten 1.50 lengths	07/05/1967
Won	B Division Handicap (1200m Clairwood) by 6 lengths	07/22/1967
At 3	10 starts 9 wins 1 fourth R52 175 (South Africa)	1967/68
Won	B Division Handicap (1200m Turffontein) by 6.50 lengths	09/30/1967
Won	Derby Trial Stakes (1600m Turffontein by 8 lengths	10/10/1967
Won	Chairman's Handicap (1200m Turfontein) by 3.25 lengths	11/25/1967
Won	Royal Reserve Guineas (1600m Germiston) by 4.5 lengths	12/02/1967
Won	Guineas Trial (1400m Kenilworth) by 2.5 lengths	01/20/1968
Won	Cape Mellow-Wood Guineas (1600m Milnerton) by 2 lengths	02/03/1968
Won	South African Guineas (1600m Greyville) by 2.75 lengths	06/08/1968
Won	Clairwood Anniversary Handicap (1200m Clairwood) by 3.75	06/15/1968
4th	Rothmans July Handicap (2100m Greyville) beaten 2 lengths	07/06/1968
Won	Clairwood Winter Handicap (1800m Clairwood) by 2.5 lengths	07/27/1968
At 4	2 starts 1 win 1 second R4 834 (South Africa)	1968
2nd	Champion Stakes (2000m Greyville) beaten a head by his half brother William Penn	08/14/1968
Won	Transvaal Spring Champion Stakes (1400m Turffontein) by 2.5 lengths	10/10/1968
At 5	10 starts 6 wins 1 second 2 thirds US$279,280 (United States)	1969
Won	Montauk Club Purse (1400m Belmont Park) by 7 lengths	06/03/1969
7th	Allowance purse (1600m Belmont Park) only race on dirt in the United States	06/17/1969
Won	Stars and Stripes Handicap (1800m Arlington Park) by 0.75 lengths	07/04/1969
3rd	Tidal Handicap (1800m Aqueduct) beaten by Fort Marcy	07/26/1969
Won	Bernard Baruch Handicap Division 2 (1700m Saratoga) by 4 lengths	08/06/1969
3rd	Kelly-Olympic Handicap (180m Atlantic City) beaten 0.75 lengths by Fort Marcy	08/30/1969
Won	United Nations Handicap (1900m Atlantic City) by 0.5 lengths	09/10/1969
Won	Sunrise Handicap (2400m Atlantic City) by 1.5 lengths	09/20/1969
Won	Man O' War Stakes (2400m Belmont Park) by 2.25 lengths in a new course record 2:27:20	10/18/1969
2nd	Washington DC International Stakes (2400m Laurel Park) beaten 1.25 lengths	11/11/1969

== Assessment ==
Hawaii's chief protagonist in the United States Fort Mercy was rated at 126lbs in 1969 on the DRF Grass Free Handicap, 4 lbs below Hawaii (130lbs). In the 1968 Free Handicap Fort Marcy (124) was rated 12lbs below Dr Fager (136). Dr Fager was rated by Tony Morris at a Timeform rating of 138. This would imply that Hawaii was rated 130-132 on the Timeform scale.

== At stud ==
Hawaii retired from racing after the 1969 racing season having won 21 of 28 career starts with earnings of US$371,292 (equivalent). Syndicated By his owner Charles Engelhard for $1,120,000 and sent to stand at stud at Claiborne Farm in Paris, Kentucky, he sired Henbit, who raced in England and won the 1980 Epsom Derby. His other outstanding progeny were Hawaiian Sound who was second in the Epsom Derby and winner of the Benson & Hedges Gold Cup in 1978, and Hunza Dancer who was third in the 1975 Epsom Derby and went on to win the Manhattan Handicap and the American Handicaps in 1977. He also produced the 1975 Kentucky Oaks winner Sun and Snow and his last group winner was Porter Rhodes(86) who won the 1989 Gallinule Stakes(GP2) in Ireland. His yearlings fetched good prices with the highest being a colt which sold in 1984 for $400,000 at the USA sales. A son of his promptly named Mr. Hawaii was sold at the 1987 South African National yearling Sales for R510 000 a then South African record for a yearling sold at public auction. Several of his descendants have won the Kentucky Derby including Lil E Tee and The last American Triple Crown winner Justify, who has Hawaii twice featured in his pedigree. He produced 39 stakes winners in his stud career winning feature races in the USA, Canada, England, Ireland, France, Italy and South Africa. He is the most successful South African bred sire yet produced.

Hawaii died at Claiborne Farm in 1990 at age twenty-six and was buried in their Marchmont division equine cemetery.

In 1977, Hawaii was elected to the Aiken Thoroughbred Racing Hall of Fame.
