= Majesty's Prince =

American-bred Thoroughbred racehorse

- Sire: His Majesty
- Grandsire: Ribot
- Dam: Pied Princess
- Damsire: Tom Fool
- Sex: Stallion
- Foaled: 1979
- Country: United States
- Colour: Chestnut
- Breeder: John D. Marsh
- Owner: John D. Marsh
- Trainer: Joseph B. Cantey
- Record: 43: 12-10-10
- Earnings: US$2,075,119

Major wins
- Belmont Lexington Stakes (1982); Lamplighter Handicap (1982); Hill Prince Stakes (1982); Rothmans International (1982, 1984); Man o' War Handicap (1983, 1984); Sword Dancer Handicap (1983, 1984)

Majesty's Prince (foaled 1979 in Virginia, euthanized in 2009) was an American Thoroughbred racehorse.

== Background ==
Bred at John D. Marsh's farm in Gainesville, Virginia, he was out of the mare Pied Princess, a daughter of 1953 American Horse of the Year and U.S. Racing Hall of Fame inductee Tom Fool. He was sired by His Majesty, who also sired the 1981 Kentucky Derby and Preakness Stakes winner, Pleasant Colony. Grandsire Ribot was a European superstar runner who went undefeated in sixteen career starts, including back-to-back wins in the Prix de l'Arc de Triomphe, and was a three-time Leading sire in Great Britain & Ireland. He was trained by Joe Cantey.

== Racing career ==
At age two, Majesty's Prince earned his best result when he finished third in the then-Grade I Laurel Futurity Stakes at Maryland's Laurel Park Racecourse. As a three-year-old, in March 1982, he ran second in the Rebel Stakes. Then, after finishing ninth in the Kentucky Derby, he did not run in the remaining two legs of the U.S. Triple Crown series.

With Majesty's Prince unsuccessful on dirt, his handlers decided to try him on turf. Eleven days after the Kentucky Derby, he debuted on grass with a win in the Hill Prince Stakes at Aqueduct Racetrack. He later won the Lexington Stakes at Belmont Park and the Lamplighter Handicap at Monmouth Park Racetrack.

On October 17, 1982, Majesty's Prince won the first major event of his career, the Rothmans International at Woodbine Racetrack in Toronto, Ontario, Canada. The race was the last leg of a series of three turf races that featured top North American and European entrants. Following his Canadian victory, the three-year-old colt ran second to April Run in the next two legs of a series: the October 23 Turf Classic at New York's Belmont Park and the November 7 Washington, D.C. International Stakes at Laurel Park Racecourse in Laurel, Maryland.

Racing at age four in 1983, Majesty's Prince won the Man o' War Stakes and Sword Dancer Invitational Handicap. He ran third to the great filly All Along in the Rothmans International and the Washington D.C. International Stakes. In 1984, Majesty's Prince earned his second consecutive win in both the Man o' War Handicap and Sword Dancer Handicap. He won his second Rothmans International and was third to John Henry in the Turf Classic. He also ran sixth to winner Lashkari in the inaugural running of the Breeders' Cup Turf in 1984.

== Stud record ==
Retired to stud duty, Majesty's Prince met with limited success. Among his racing offspring, he notably sired 1993 Bowling Green Handicap winner Dr. Kiernan.

Majesty's Prince was euthanized at age 30 due to the infirmities of old age.

== Pedigree ==
Pedigree of Majesty's Prince, chestnut stallion, 1979
Sire His Majesty	Ribot	Tenerani	Bellini
Sire His Majesty	Ribot	Tenerani	Tofanella
Sire His Majesty	Ribot	Romanella	El Greco
Sire His Majesty	Ribot	Romanella	Barbara Burrini
Sire His Majesty	Flower Bowl	Alibhai	Hyperion
Sire His Majesty	Flower Bowl	Alibhai	Teresina
Sire His Majesty	Flower Bowl	Flower Bed	Beau Pere
Sire His Majesty	Flower Bowl	Flower Bed	Boudoir
Dam Pied Princess	Tom Fool	Menow	Pharamond
Dam Pied Princess	Tom Fool	Menow	Alcibiades
Dam Pied Princess	Tom Fool	Gaga	Bull Dog
Dam Pied Princess	Tom Fool	Gaga	Alpoise
Dam Pied Princess	Melanie's Girl	Nashua	Nasrullah*
Dam Pied Princess	Melanie's Girl	Nashua	Segula
Dam Pied Princess	Melanie's Girl	Nebroda	Nearco*
Dam Pied Princess	Melanie's Girl	Nebroda	Stafaralla (family: 14-b)

* Majesty's Prince is inbred 5D x 4D to the stallion Nearco, meaning that he appears fifth generation (via Nasrullah) and fourth generation on the dam side of his pedigree.
