= Bowling Green Stakes =

- Class: Grade II
- Location: Saratoga Race Course; Saratoga Springs, New York, United States
- Inaugurated: 1958 (at Belmont Park)
- Race type: Thoroughbred – Flat racing
- Website: NYRA

Race information
- Distance: 1 3/8 miles (11 furlongs)
- Surface: Turf
- Track: Left-handed
- Qualification: Four-year-olds & up
- Weight: 124 lbs with allowances
- Purse: $200,000 (2025)

The Bowling Green Stakes is a Grade II American thoroughbred horse race for horses age four years old and older over a distance of 1 3/8 miles on the turf held annually in late July at Saratoga Race Course in Saratoga Springs, New York.

== History ==
The inaugural running of the event was on 11 June 1958 at Belmont Park as the sixth event on the card that day and was won by the French bred horse, Rafty trained by the US Hall of Fame trainer Hollie Hughes in a time of 2:17 1/5.

The event is named for the area on the lower tip of Manhattan Island, known as Bowling Green.

In 1963 the event was moved to Aqueduct Racecourse and the distance was increased to 13 furlongs (1 5/8 miles). The last running of the event at Aqueduct in 1967 is one of the more notable when Poker defeated champions Assagai and his own stablemate, the 1966 US Horse of the Year, Buckpasser who was entering the race with a fifteen race winning streak.

The 1970 winner Fort Marcy would later that year be crowned US Horse of the Year and the 1972 winner Run the Gantlet was the 1971 US Champion Male Turf Horse.

In 1973 the event was classified as Grade II and for several years in the late 1980s the event held Grade I status.

In winning the Bowling Green Handicap on 17 June 1990 at Belmont Park, the 1989 Canadian champion With Approval set a new World Record of 2:10 1/5 for 1 3/8 miles on turf. As of today, the record remains unmatched.

The 2008 edition was replaced in its summer spot by the Man o' War Stakes. The Man o' War was moved from a fall schedule to improve turf scheduling competition. In 2015 the New York Racing Association moved the Bowling Green to Saratoga.

Two mares have won this race, Drumtop in 1971 setting a new course record for the 1 1/2 miles distance and Summer Guest in 1973. Drumtop also finished second to Fort Marcy in 1970.

In 2024 the British-bred Silver Knott set a new track record at Saratoga Racetrack for the 1 3/8 miles distance winning in 2:11.40 on the inner turf course.

== Records ==
Speed record:

- 1 3/8 miles: 2:10.20 – With Approval (1990) (new World Record)

Margins:

- 4 lengths – Open Call (1982)

Most wins:

- 2 – Whitmore's Conn (2002, 2003)
- 2 – Channel Maker (2018, 2023)
- 2 – Cross Border (2020, 2021)

Most wins by an owner:

- 4 – Rokeby Stables (1970, 1972, 1973, 1984)

Most wins by a jockey:

- 3 – Jorge Velásquez (1969, 1970, 1982)
- 3 – Jerry Bailey (1984, 1991, 2001)
- 3 – John Velazquez (1994, 1998, 2012)
- 3 – Javier Castellano (2013, 2015, 2016)
- 3 – Flavien Prat (2022, 2024, 2026)

Most wins by a trainer:

- 5 – William I. Mott (1987, 2001, 2010, 2018, 2023)

== Winners ==
Year	Winner	Age	Jockey	Trainer	Owner	Distance	Time	Purse	Grade	Ref
At Saratoga – Bowling Green Stakes
2026	Ole Crazy Bone	6	Flavien Prat	Michael J. Maker	Flying P Stable	1 3/8 miles	2:14.18	$250,000	II	
2025	Far Bridge	5	Joe Rosario	Miguel Clement	LSU Stables	1 3/8 miles	2:15.38	$180,000	II	
2024	Silver Knott (GB)	4	Flavien Prat	Charlie Appleby	Godolphin Racing	1 3/8 miles	2:11.03	$242,500	II	
2023	Channel Maker	9	Manuel Franco	William I. Mott	Wachtel Stable, Gary Barber, R. A. Hill Stable & Reeves Thoroughbred Racing	1 3/8 miles	2:15.21	$250,000	II	
2022	Rockemperor	6	Flavien Prat	Chad C. Brown	Madaket Stables, Michael Dubb, Wonder Stables, & Michael E. & Carus Kisber	1 3/8 miles	2:15.81	$242,500	II	
2021	Cross Border	7	Luis Saez	Michael J. Maker	Three Diamonds Farm	1 3/8 miles	2:16.36	$250,000	II	
2020	‡ Cross Border	6	José Ortiz	Michael J. Maker	Three Diamonds Farm	1 3/8 miles	2:14.77	$250,000	II	
2019	Channel Cat	4	Luis Saez	Todd A. Pletcher	Calumet Farm	1 3/8 miles	2:14.43	$250,000	II	
2018	Channel Maker	4	Joel Rosario	William I. Mott	Matthew Schera	1 3/8 miles	2:19.41	$250,000	II	Dead heat
2018	Glorious Empire (IRE)	7	Julien R. Leparoux	James Lawrence II	Gary Barber & Wachtel Stable	1 3/8 miles	2:19.41	$250,000	II	Dead heat
2017	Hunter O'Riley	4	Florent Geroux	James J. Toner	Sean Shay & Michael J. Ryan	1 3/8 miles	2:12.94	$250,000	II	
2016	Flintshire (GB)	6	Javier Castellano	Chad C. Brown	Juddmonte Farms	1 3/8 miles	2:18.24	$237,500	II	
At Saratoga – Bowling Green Handicap
2015	Red Rifle	5	Javier Castellano	Todd A. Pletcher	Twin Creeks Racing	1 3/8 miles	2:13.69	$250,000	II	
At Belmont Park – Bowling Green Handicap
2014	Hangover Kid	6	Jose Lezcano	Jason Servis	Four Tags Stable	1 1/2 miles	2:28.18	$200,000	II	
2013	Hyper	6	Javier Castellano	Chad C. Brown	Kenneth and Sarah Ramsey	1 1/4 miles	2:01.37	$250,000	II	
2012	Air Support	4	John R. Velazquez	Claude R. McGaughey III	Stuart S. Janney III	1 1/4 miles	2:06.12	$196,000	II	
2011	Grassy	5	Garrett K. Gomez	Christophe Clement	Claiborne Farm & Adele Dilschneider	1 3/8 miles	2:19.69	$150,000	II	
2010	Al Khali	4	Alan Garcia	William I. Mott	Brous Stable & Wachtel Stale	1 3/8 miles	2:15.23	$150,000	II	
2009	Grand Couturier (GB)	6	Alan Garcia	Robert Ribaudo	Marc Keller	1 3/8 miles	2:15.86	$158,500	II	
2008	Race not held									
2007	Sunriver	4	Garrett K. Gomez	Todd A. Pletcher	Aaron U. & Marie Jones	1 3/8 miles	2:12.68	$150,000	II	
2006	Go Deputy	6	Fernando Jara	Todd A. Pletcher	Wertheimer et Frère	1 3/8 miles	2:17.49	$147,000	II	
2005	Cacht Wells (ARG)	5	Eibar Coa	Stanley M. Hough	Castletop Stable	1 3/8 miles	2:15.49	$150,000	II	
2004	Kicken Kris	4	Edgar S. Prado	Michael R. Matz	Brushwood Stable	1 3/8 miles	2:12.19	$150,000	II	
2003	Whitmore's Conn	5	Jean-Luc Samyn	Randy Schulhofer	Michael & Lynn Shanley	1 3/8 miles	2:15.92	$150,000	II	
2002	Whitmore's Conn	4	Shaun Bridgmohan	Randy Schulhofer	Michael & Lynn Shanley	1 3/8 miles	2:13.43	$150,000	II	
2001	King Cugat	4	Jerry D. Bailey	William I. Mott	Centennial Farms	1 3/8 miles	2:10.62	$150,000	II	
2000	Elhayq (IRE)	5	Shaun Bridgmohan	Kiaran P. McLaughlin	Shadwell Racing	1 3/8 miles	2:13.81	$150,000	II	
1999	Honor Glide	5	José A. Santos	Christophe Clement	Robert Schaedle III	1 3/8 miles	2:11.07	$150,000	II	
1998	Cetewayo	4	John R. Velazquez	Michael W. Dickinson	John A. Chandler	1 3/8 miles	2:13.45	$150,000	II	
1997	Influent	6	Jean-Luc Samyn	Howard M. Tesher	Turfnpaddock Farm	1 3/8 miles	2:11.06	$150,000	II	
1996	Flag Down	6	José A. Santos	Christophe Clement	Allen E. Paulson	1 3/8 miles	2:13.29	$150,000	II	
1995	Sentimental Moi	5	Ramon B. Perez	William Badgett Jr.	Landon Knight	1 3/8 miles	2:15.48	$150,000	II	
1994	Turk Passer	4	John R. Velazquez	Anthony R. Margotta Jr.	Michael Shanley	1 3/8 miles	2:13.25	$150,000	II	
1993	Dr. Kiernan	4	Chris Antley	Gary Sciacca	Howard T. Whitbred	1 3/8 miles	2:17.70	$150,000	II	
1992	Wall Street Dancer	4	Pat Day	Niall M. O'Callaghan	John D. Gunther	1 3/8 miles	2:12.92	$200,000	II	
1991	Three Coins Up	3	Jerry D. Bailey	John P. Campo	Ol' Pippingrock Farm	1 3/8 miles	2:10.86	$200,000	II	
1990	With Approval	4	Craig Perret	Roger L. Attfield	Kinghaven Farms	1 3/8 miles	2:10.20	$188,800	II	
1989	El Senor	5	Herb McCauley	William W. Wright	Frances W. Luro	1 3/8 miles	2:18.60	$241,600	I	
1988	Coeur de Lion (FR)	4	Craig Perret	William B. Cox	Evergreen Farms	1 3/8 miles	2:13.40	$252,800	I	
1987	Theatrical (IRE)	5	Pat Day	William I. Mott	Bertram R. Firestone	1 3/8 miles	2:14.00	$241,600	I	
1986	Uptown Swell	4	Eddie Maple	Richard J. Lundy	Virginia Kraft Rayson	1 3/8 miles	2:14.80	$223,650	I	
1985	Sharannpour (IRE)	5	Ángel Cordero Jr.	Robert J. Frankel	Jerry Moss	1 3/8 miles	2:18.20	$238,000	I	
1984	Hero's Honor	4	Jerry D. Bailey	MacKenzie Miller	Rokeby Stables	1 3/8 miles	2:14.00	$217,700	I	
1983	Tantalizing	4	Jacinto Vásquez	Angel Penna Sr.	Ogden Mills Phipps	1 3/8 miles	2:14.80	$175,200	I	
1982	Open Call	4	Jorge Velásquez	Robert J. Reinacher Jr.	Greentree Stable	1 3/8 miles	2:24.80	$149,750	II	
1981	Great Neck	5	Ángel Cordero Jr.	Jan H. Nerud	Tartan Farms (James & Virginia Binger)	1 3/8 miles	2:12.00	$140,750	II	
1980	Sten	5	Jeffrey Fell	Richard T. DeStasio	Michael Berry	1 3/8 miles	2:13.20	$144,250	II	
1979	Overskate	4	Robin Platts	Gil H. Rowntree	John H. Stafford	1 3/8 miles	2:11.40	$140,875	II	
1978	Tiller	4	Jeffrey Fell	David A. Whiteley	William Haggin Perry	1 3/8 miles	2:12.40	$117,100	II	
1977	Hunza Dancer	5	Jean Cruguet	Arthur E. Breasley	Ravi Tikkoo	1 1/4 miles	1:58.80	$114,300	II	
1976	Erwin Boy	5	Ron Turcotte	James P. Conway	Sea High Stable	1 1/2 miles	2:26.00	$56,900	II	
1975	Barcas	4	Marco Castaneda	Leonard Imperio	Nelson Bunker Hunt	1 1/2 miles	2:32.20	$55,500	II	
1974	Take Off	5	Ron Turcotte	Frank Catrone	Ada L. Rice	1 1/2 miles	2:26.40	$57,100	II	
1973	† Summer Guest	4	Jacinto Vásquez	J. Elliott Burch	Rokeby Stable	1 1/2 miles	2:29.20	$57,000	II	
1972	Run The Gantlet	4	Robert Woodhouse	J. Elliott Burch	Rokeby Stable	1 1/2 miles	2:27.80	$56,000		
1971	† Drumtop	5	Chuck Baltazar	Roger Laurin	James B. Moseley	1 1/2 miles	2:25.40	$56,800		
1970	Fort Marcy	6	Jorge Velásquez	J. Elliott Burch	Rokeby Stable	1 1/2 miles	2:26.60	$47,400		
1969	Czar Alexander (GB)	4	Jorge Velásquez	Angel Penna Sr.	Gustave Ring	1 1/2 miles	2:27.40	$59,400		
1968	High Hat	4	Eddie Belmonte	Kay E. Jensen	Mrs. Wallace Gilroy	1 1/2 miles	2:27.40	$56,000		
At Aqueduct
1967	§ Poker	4	William Boland	Edward A. Neloy	Ogden Phipps	1 5/8 miles	2:41.40	$55,400		
1966	Moontrip (ARG)	5	Larry Adams	Randy Sechrest	Ewing Kauffman	1 5/8 miles	2:38.80	$59,400		
1965	Or et Argent (FR)	4	Walter Blum	Wayne B. Stucki	Colin Campbell	1 5/8 miles	2:40.60	$59,500		
1964	Cedar Key	4	Manuel Ycaza	Bill Shoemaker	Jerry Basta	1 5/8 miles	2:41.80	$28,850		
1963	Pollingfold (IRE)	4	Willie Harmatz	James E. Fitzsimmons	Mrs. Frank E. Power	1 5/8 miles	2:45.40	$27,800		
At Belmont Park
1962	Royal Record	4	Hedley Woodhouse	John M. Gaver Sr.	Wheatley Stable	1 1/2 miles	2:33.20	$28,850		
1961	Dead Center	4	Jack Yother	Alphonse J. Pupino	Alphonse J. Pupino	1 1/2 miles	2:29.80	$39,650		
1960	Amber Morn	4	Pete Anderson	James R. Hastie	Ken-Love Farm	1 1/2 miles	2:29.20	$59,400		
1959	Bell Hop (FR)	4	Bobby Ussery	Oleg Dubassoff	John M. Schiff	1 3/8 miles	2:14.60	$29,400		
1958	Rafty (FR)	6	Eric Guerin	Hollie Hughes	Sanford Stud Farms	1 3/8 miles	2:17.20	$29,400		

Notes:
† Filly or Mare
§ Ran as part of an entry
‡ In the 2020 running Sadler's Joy was first past the post but was disqualified for interference in the straight and was placed fourth. Cross Border was declared the winner.

== See also ==
List of American and Canadian Graded races
