= Man o' War Stakes =

- Class: Grade II
- Location: Belmont Park; Elmont, New York, United States
- Inaugurated: 1959 (as Man o' War Handicap at Aqueduct Racetrack)
- Race type: Thoroughbred – Flat racing
- Website: NYRA

Race information
- Distance: 1 3/8 miles
- Surface: Turf
- Track: Left-handed
- Qualification: Four-year-olds and older
- Weight: 124 lbs with allowances
- Purse: $400,000 (since 2024)

The Man o' War Stakes is a Grade II American thoroughbred horse race for horses aged four-years-old and older. It is run over a distance of one and three-eighth miles on turf and is scheduled annually for early May at Belmont Park in Elmont, New York. The current purse is $400,000.

== History ==
The event is named in honor of U.S. Racing Hall of Fame Champion Man o' War who was selected as No. 1 in the Blood-Horse magazine List of the Top 100 U.S. Racehorses of the 20th Century.

The inaugural running of the event was on 24 October 1959 at the newly reopened Aqueduct Racetrack as the Man o' War Handicap over a distance of 1 1/2 miles. The event attracted 23 entrants thus enabling NYRA to run the event as two split divisions with a record total purse of $225,100. The event attracted some of the finest long distance turf horses including British bred Tudor Era who was first past the post in the 1958 Washington D.C. International at Laurel but was disqualified. Tudor Era would win the Second Division of the event as the favorite defeating Marlow Road by 3 lengths with Anisado in third place in a time of 2:41 flat. In 1960 the event was held at Belmont Park with the 37-1 Harmonizing defeating Bald Eagle and the 1959 U.S. Horse of the Year Sword Dancer. Bald Eagle would go on and win the Washington D.C. International and would be crowded U.S. Champion Older Male Horse.

The event was moved back Aqueduct in 1961 at a longer distance of one and five-eighths miles with handicap conditions. NYRA by scheduling the event in October established New York as a logical and natural place for international and top US turf runners to prepare for the Washington D.C. International which was considered as the forerunner to the Breeders' Cup Turf and the championship long distance turf race. The 1962 renewal of the event as the Man o' War Stakes at Belmont Park was run with Weight for Age conditions. The winner, 20-1 longshot Beau Purple who set a track record of 2:28.60 for the 1 1/2 miles in defeating a group of highly talented entrants, including 1961 U.S. Horse of the Year and last winner of the Jockey Club Gold Cup Kelso in second, former English based The Axe II in third, who would win this event the following year, Wise Ship in fourth, who won this event in 1961 and the 1961 Kentucky Derby winner Carry Back who finished fifth. Other starters included 1962 Belmont Stakes winner Jaipur, T.V. Lark, Honey Dear, Guadalcanal and the 1960 winner of this event Harmonizing.

The event was held at Aqueduct from 1963 to 1967 while Belmont Park was under reconstruction. On return to Belmont Park in 1968 a host of champions would win the event. In 1969 the South African bred Champion Three-year-old Hawaii would win the event and would be crowned U.S. Champion Turf Horse. The following year, in 1970 Fort Marcy would finally win the event after four tries including twice second (1967, 1968) and third to Hawaii in 1969. In 1970 Fort Marcy also won the Washington D.C. International for the second time and was crowned U.S. Horse of the Year. The 1971 winner Run the Gantlet was also victorious in the Washington D.C. International and was crowned U.S. Champion Turf Horse. In 1972 the event was won by the six year old mare Typecast and she would be crowned U.S. Champion Older Female Horse.

In 1973 the first year the classification system was enacted, the event was set with Grade I status. The 1973 winner was the U.S. Triple Crown Champion, Secretariat. Secretariat was to have his first start on the grass and nine days after he was beaten in the Grade 1 Woodward Stakes over 1 1/2 miles. Nonetheless, Secretariat would win the event by 5 lengths as the 1/2 odds-on favorite setting a new track record of 2:24 4/5. Secretariat would be awarded U.S. Champion Turf Horse and U.S. Horse of the Year.

In 1974 the event was won by the French based mare Dahlia who had earlier campaigned in England and France. Dahlia would win the Canadian International Stakes in her next start and would be crowned U.S. Champion Turf Horse.

In 1977 NYRA introduced the Turf Classic over the same distance of 1 1/2 miles that was held in November. The scheduling of the Man o' War Stakes would be affected in that NYRA would try and space out the time between the dates that the events were held in the fall. In 1978 the distance of the event was decreased by one furlong to the current distance of 1 3/8 miles. The event that year was won by the French bred Waya and would win the Turf Classic two weeks later. In 1979 Bowl Game was able complete the treble in capturing the Man o' War Stakes, Turf Classic and Washington D.C. International. Such a feat earned Bowl Game U.S. Champion Turf Horse honors for 1979.

With the introduction of the Breeders' Cup in 1984 with the Breeders' Cup Turf the Man o' War Stakes become a major preparatory event in the early fall.

Irish bred Theatrical won the event in October 1987 at Aqueduct after also winning the Turf Classic which was scheduled earlier in September and then went on to also win the Breeders' Cup Turf at Hollywood Park. Theatrical was crowned U.S. Champion Turf Horse for 1987. Other fine horses to have completed the Man o' War-Turf Classic double include 1988 winner Sunshine Forever, 1989 winner Yankee Affair and 1991 winner Solar Splendor who set a new stakes record of 2:12:01 as a 24-1 longshot on the inner turf track. Solar Splendor would repeat winning the event the following year on the main turf track this time setting a new course record of 2:12.45. In 1999 Val's Prince also completed the NYRA Turf double but failed to spark in the Breeders' Cup Turf finishing eleventh.

The 2005 winner Better Talk Now won the event setting a new stakes record in 2:11.65. Better Talk Now had won the Breeders' Cup Turf in 2004 at Lone Star Park.

In 2008 the Man o' War was moved from Belmont's fall schedule into its summer schedule, replacing the Bowling Green Handicap in an attempt to more fairly represent turf competition. Also that year the conditions of the event were changed from Weight for Age to stakes with allowances.

In 2014 the event was scheduled in May and the conditions of the event were changed so that three-year-olds would not be allowed to enter.

In 2017 the event was won by the five-year-old Irish bred mare Zhukova who started as the 9/10 odds-on favorite and set a new stakes winning margin by 6 lengths over Taghleeb in a small field of five starters in a time of 2:25.31 on a yielding track in rainy weather. Zhukova was the fifth mare to have had won the event after Dotted Line (1959), Typecast (1973), Dahlia (1974) and Waya (1978).

In 2020 due to the COVID-19 pandemic in the United States, NYRA did not schedule the event in their updated and shortened spring-summer meeting.

In 2024 the event was downgraded by the Thoroughbred Owners and Breeders Association to Grade II status. Also the event was moved to Aqueduct Racetrack due to infield tunnel and redevelopment work at Belmont Park.

== Records ==
Time record:

- 1 3/8 miles – 2:11.65 – Better Talk Now (2005)
- 1 1/2 miles – 2:24.80 – Secretariat (1973)
- 1 5/8 miles – 2:42.60 – Hill Rise (1965)

Margins:

- 6 lengths – Zhukova (IRE) (2017)

Most wins:

- 2 – Majesty's Prince (1983, 1984)
- 2 – Solar Splendor (1991, 1992)
- 2 – Gio Ponti (2009, 2010)
- 2 – With Anticipation (2001, 2002)

Most wins by an owner:

- 3 – Rokeby Stable (1970, 1971, 1986)
- 3 – Phipps Stable (2012, 2013, 2014)
- 3 – Godolphin (1998, 2000, 2024)

Most wins by a jockey:

- 5 – Jorge Velásquez (1968, 1969, 1970, 1975, 1979)

Most wins by a trainer:

- 4 – MacKenzie Miller (1966, 1969, 1975, 1986)

== Winners ==
Year	Winner	Age	Jockey	Trainer	Owner	Distance	Time	Purse	Grade	Ref
At Aqueduct – Man o' War Stakes
2025	Far Bridge	5	Joel Rosario	Christophe Clement	LSU Stables	1 3/8 miles	2:17.24	$388,000	II	
2024	Silver Knott (GB)	4	Flavien Prat	Charlie Appleby	Godolphin Racing	1 3/8 miles	2:13.80	$400,000	II	
At Belmont Park
2023	Red Knight	9	Irad Ortiz Jr.	Michael J. Maker	Trinity Farm	1 3/8 miles	2:13.74	$600,000	I	
2022	Highland Chief (IRE)	5	Trevor McCarthy	H. Graham Motion	Mrs. Fitriani Hay	1 3/8 miles	2:17.04	$651,000	I	
2021	Channel Cat	5	John R. Velazquez	Jack Sisterson	Calumet Farm	1 3/8 miles	2:13.34	$700,000	I	
2020	Race not held									
2019	Channel Maker	5	Joel Rosario	William I. Mott	Wachtel Stable, Gary Barber, R. A. Hill Stable & Reeves Thoroughbred Racing	1 3/8 miles	2:12.43	$700,000	I	
2018	Hi Happy (ARG)	5	Luis Saez	Todd A. Pletcher	Haras La Providencia	1 3/8 miles	2:14.79	$700,000	I	
2017	ƒ Zhukova (IRE)	5	John R. Velazquez	Dermot K. Weld	John D. Murrell	1 3/8 miles	2:25.31	$392,000	I	
2016	Wake Forest (GER)	6	John R. Velazquez	Chad C. Brown	Michael Dubb, Sheep Pond Partners & Bethlehem Stables	1 3/8 miles	2:12.94	$400,000	I	
2015	Twilight Eclipse	6	Javier Castellano	Thomas Albertrani	West Point Thoroughbreds	1 3/8 miles	2:14.44	$400,000	I	
2014	Imagining	6	Joel Rosario	Claude R. McGaughey III	Phipps Stable	1 3/8 miles	2:17.22	$400,000	I	
2013	Boisterous	6	John R. Velazquez	Claude R. McGaughey III	Phipps Stable	1 3/8 miles	2:14.11	$600,000	I	
2012	Point of Entry	4	Jose Lezcano	Claude R. McGaughey III	Phipps Stable	1 3/8 miles	2:13.87	$600,000	I	
2011	Cape Blanco (IRE)	4	Jamie P. Spencer	Aidan P. O'Brien	Derrick Smith, Mrs. John Magnier, Michael Tabor & Mrs. Fitriani Hay	1 3/8 miles	2:14.06	$600,000	I	
2010	Gio Ponti	5	Ramon A. Dominguez	Christophe Clement	Castleton Lyons	1 3/8 miles	2:16.20	$600,000	I	
2009	Gio Ponti	4	Ramon A. Dominguez	Christophe Clement	Castleton Lyons	1 3/8 miles	2:12.56	$500,000	I	
2008	Red Rocks (IRE)	5	Javier Castellano	Brian J. Meehan	J. Paul Reddam	1 3/8 miles	2:12.60	$500,000	I	
2007	Doctor Dino (FR)	5	Olivier Peslier	Richard D. Gibson	Javier Martinez Salmean	1 3/8 miles	2:12.26	$500,000	I	
2006	Cacique (IRE)	5	Edgar S. Prado	Robert J. Frankel	Juddmonte Farms	1 3/8 miles	2:15.68	$500,000	I	
2005	§ Better Talk Now	6	Ramon A. Dominguez	H. Graham Motion	Bushwood Stables	1 3/8 miles	2:11.65	$500,000	I	
2004	Magistretti	4	Edgar S. Prado	Patrick L. Biancone	Michael B. Tabor	1 3/8 miles	2:14.65	$500,000	I	
2003	Lunar Sovereign	4	Richard Migliore	Kiaran P. McLaughlin	Darley Racing	1 3/8 miles	2:17.99	$500,000	I	
2002	With Anticipation	7	Pat Day	Jonathan E. Sheppard	Augustin Stable	1 3/8 miles	2:15.05	$500,000	I	
2001	With Anticipation	6	Pat Day	Jonathan E. Sheppard	Augustin Stable	1 3/8 miles	2:15.11	$500,000	I	
2000	Fantastic Light	4	Jerry D. Bailey	Saeed bin Suroor	Godolphin Racing	1 3/8 miles	2:17.44	$500,000	I	
1999	Val's Prince	7	Jorge F. Chavez	H. James Bond	Robin Martin & Steve Weiner	1 3/8 miles	2:16.69	$500,000	I	
1998	Daylami (IRE)	4	Jerry D. Bailey	Saeed bin Suroor	Godolphin Racing	1 3/8 miles	2:13.18	$400,000	I	
1997	Influent	6	Jerry D. Bailey	Howard M. Tesher	Turfnpaddock Farm	1 3/8 miles	2:11.69	$400,000	I	
1996	Diplomatic Jet	4	Jorge F. Chavez	James E. Picou	Fred W. Hooper	1 3/8 miles	2:14.20	$400,000	I	
1995	Millkom (GB)	6	Gary L. Stevens	Jean-Claude Rouget	Gary A. Tanaka	1 3/8 miles	2:12.80	$400,000	I	
1994	Royal Mountain Inn	5	Julie Krone	Barclay Tagg	Steadfast Stable	1 3/8 miles	2:11.75	$400,000	I	
1993	Star of Cozzene	5	Jose A. Santos	Mark A. Hennig	Team Valor	1 3/8 miles	2:23.14	$400,000	I	
1992	Solar Splendor	5	Herb McCauley	Patrick J. Kelly	Live Oak Plantation	1 3/8 miles	2:12.45	$400,000	I	
1991	Solar Splendor	4	Herb McCauley	Patrick J. Kelly	Live Oak Plantation	1 3/8 miles	2:12.01	$400,000	I	
1990	Defensive Play	3	Pat Eddery	Guy Harwood	Juddmonte Farms	1 3/8 miles	2:17.80	$473,600	I	
1989	Yankee Affair	7	Jose A. Santos	Henry L. Carroll	Ju Ju Gen Stable	1 3/8 miles	2:20.80	$470,400	I	
1988	Sunshine Forever	3	Ángel Cordero Jr.	John M. Veitch	Darby Dan Farm	1 3/8 miles	2:14.40	$596,000	I	
At Aqueduct
1987	Theatrical (IRE)	5	Pat Day	William I. Mott	Bertram R. Firestone	1 3/8 miles	2:15.40	$585,000	I	
At Belmont Park
1986	Dance of Life	3	Pat Day	MacKenzie Miller	Rokeby Stable	1 3/8 miles	2:14.40	$290,000	I	
1985	Win	5	Richard Migliore	Sally A. Bailie	Frederick Ephraim	1 3/8 miles	2:15.40	$306,000	I	
1984	Majesty's Prince	5	Vincent Bracciale Jr.	Joseph B. Cantey	John D. Marsh	1 3/8 miles	2:14.60	$312,000	I	
1983	Majesty's Prince	4	Eddie Maple	Joseph B. Cantey	John D. Marsh	1 3/8 miles	2:23.60	$294,500	I	
1982	Naskra's Breeze	5	Jean-Luc Samyn	Philip G. Johnson	Broadmoor Stable	1 3/8 miles	2:13.00	$173,000	I	
1981	Galaxy Libra (IRE)	5	Bill Shoemaker	Charles E. Whittingham	Louis R. Rowan	1 3/8 miles	2:14.80	$165,300	I	
1980	French Colonial	5	Jacinto Vasquez	David A. Whiteley	Lazy F Ranch	1 3/8 miles	2:15.40	$140,100	I	
1979	Bowl Game	5	Jorge Velásquez	John M. Gaver Jr.	Greentree Stable	1 3/8 miles	2:19.00	$137,375	I	
1978	ƒ Waya (FR)	4	Ángel Cordero Jr.	Angel Penna Sr.	Daniel Wildenstein	1 3/8 miles	2:16.20	$132,875	I	
1977	Majestic Light	4	Sandy Hawley	John W. Russell	Ogden Mills Phipps	1 1/2 miles	2:27.60	$113,100	I	
1976	Effervescing	3	Ángel Cordero Jr.	John W. Russell	Ogden Phipps	1 1/2 miles	2:31.20	$112,500	I	
1975	† Snow Knight (GB)	4	Jorge Velásquez	MacKenzie Miller	Windfields Farm	1 1/2 miles	2:29.20	$114,000	I	
1974	ƒ Dahlia	4	Ron Turcotte	Maurice Zilber	Nelson Bunker Hunt	1 1/2 miles	2:26.60	$119,500	I	
1973	Secretariat	3	Ron Turcotte	Lucien Laurin	Meadow Stable	1 1/2 miles	2:24.80	$113,600	I	
1972	ƒ Typecast	6	Ángel Cordero Jr.	A. Thomas Doyle	Westerly Stud Farms	1 1/2 miles	2:31.80	$117,300		
1971	Run the Gantlet	3	Robert Woodhouse	J. Elliott Burch	Rokeby Stable	1 1/2 miles	2:33.20	$112,000		
1970	Fort Marcy	6	Jorge Velásquez	J. Elliott Burch	Rokeby Stable	1 1/2 miles	2:33.80	$116,100		
1969	Hawaii (SAF)	5	Jorge Velásquez	MacKenzie Miller	Cragwood Stables	1 1/2 miles	2:27.20	$113,300		
1968	Czar Alexander (GB)	3	Jorge Velásquez	Angel Penna Sr.	Gustave Ring	1 1/2 miles	2:30.80	$116,200		
At Aqueduct
1967	Ruffled Feathers	3	David Hidalgo	John A. Nerud	Tartan Stable	1 5/8 miles	2:42.80	$116,100		
1966	Assagai	3	Larry Adams	MacKenzie Miller	Cragwood Stable	1 5/8 miles	2:44.60	$112,100		
1965	Hill Rise	4	Manuel Ycaza	William B. Finnegan	El Peco Ranch	1 5/8 miles	2:42.60	$112,700		
1964	Turbo Jet II (IRE)	4	Howard Grant	Frank A. Bonsal	Barclay Stable	1 5/8 miles	2:42.80	$111,800		
1963	The Axe II	5	John L. Rotz	John M. Gaver, Sr.	Greentree Stable	1 5/8 miles	2:45.60	$113,700		
At Belmont Park
1962	Beau Purple	5	William Boland	H. Allen Jerkens	Hobeau Farm	1 1/2 miles	2:28.60	$114,800		
At Aqueduct – Man o' War Handicap
1961	Wise Ship	4	Heliodoro Gustines	Jacob Byer	Milton J. Ritzenberg	1 5/8 miles	2:50.40	$100,000		
At Belmont Park – Man o' War Stakes
1960	Harmonizing	6	John Ruane	Everett W. King	Sadie L. King	1 1/2 miles	2:33.20	$110,200		
At Aqueduct – Man o' War Handicap
1959	ƒ Dotted Line	6	William Boland	Max Hirsch	King Ranch	1 1/2 miles	2:40.80	$112,050		Division 1
1959	Tudor Era (GB)	6	Bill Hartack	Arnold N. Winick	Minnie G. Herff	1 1/2 miles	2:41.00	$113,050		Division 2

Notes:
§ Ran as an entry
ƒ Filly or Mare
† In the 1975 running of the event One On The Aisle was first past the post but was disqualified for interference in the straight and was placed second. Snow Knight was declared the official winner of the event.

== See also ==
- List of American and Canadian Graded races
