= With Approval =

Canadian-bred Thoroughbred racehorse

- Sire: Caro
- Grandsire: Fortino
- Dam: Passing Mood
- Damsire: Buckpasser
- Sex: Stallion
- Foaled: May 9, 1986
- Country: Canada
- Colour: Gray
- Breeder: Kinghaven Farms
- Owner: Kinghaven Farms
- Trainer: Roger Attfield
- Record: 23: 13–5–1
- Earnings: $2,863,540

Major wins
- Display Stakes (1988); Marine Stakes (1989); Plate Trial Stakes (1989); Queen's Plate (1989); Prince of Wales Stakes (1989); Breeders' Stakes (1989); Connaught Cup Stakes (1990); Bowling Green Handicap (1990); Tidal Handicap (1990)

Awards
- 8th Canadian Triple Crown Champion (1989); Canadian 3-yr-Old Champion Colt (1989); Canadian Horse of the Year (1989)

Honours
- Canadian Horse Racing Hall of Fame (1993)
- Last updated on April 4, 2008

With Approval (May 9, 1986 – June 21, 2010) was a Thoroughbred racehorse who won the Canadian Triple Crown in 1989 under jockey Don Seymour. Even though he missed the rest of his three-year-old season due to injury, he was named the 1989 Canadian Horse of the Year.

At four, With Approval set a new world record of 2:10.26 for 1 3/8 miles on turf while winning the Bowling Green Handicap. He also finished second in the 1990 Breeders' Cup Turf and the Arlington Million. In 1993, With Approval was inducted into the Canadian Horse Racing Hall of Fame.

== Background ==
With Approval raced as a homebred for Donald G. Willmot's Kinghaven Farms. He inherited his gray coat from his sire Caro, an Irish-bred stallion who raced in France and was later imported into the United States. Caro was an important sire whose offspring included Kentucky Derby winning filly Winning Colors and Breeders' Cup Mile winner Cozzene.

With Approval's dam was Passing Mood, a stakes-winning mare by leading broodmare sire Buckpasser. Passing Mood, who was also the dam of Belmont Stakes winner Touch Gold, received the 1989 Sovereign Award for Outstanding Broodmare. With Approval is just one of several outstanding horses descended from Cool Mood, a stakes-winning daughter of Northern Dancer who was inducted into the Canadian Racing Hall of Fame in 2014.

With Approval was trained by Roger Attfield, who was inducted into the Canadian Horse Racing Hall of Fame in 1999 and the American Hall of Fame in 2012. With Approval was known to the racing public as the "Cardiac Kid" for being involved in a number of close finishes. His handlers though called him 'Snoopy'. "He was always a very inquisitive horse and he'd love to stare around all the time and that's how he got the nickname 'Snoopy'," said Attfield in a later interview. "He was just a very inquisitive horse and the more the years went by the more he got to be that way. To get him from his barn to the paddock we'd have to leave a long time before we needed to because it took forever to walk him to the track. Every hundred yards he'd want to stop and look and if you tried to chase him on he'd get really annoyed."

== Racing career ==
Attfield thought that With Approval was a promising colt from the middle of the summer of 1988. While in training for his first race, though, the horse got loose and ran towards the stable, hitting his shoulder going into the barn. Believing he would not quickly recover from the injury, Attfield did not enter him in the prestigious Coronation Futurity. Instead, he gave the horse some extra time and With Approval made his first start on the turf at Woodbine on October 9, winning by two lengths. "When he broke his maiden I said in the papers that I'll win the Coronation," recalled Attfield. "But a friend of mine saw the quote and said to me, 'You'll not win that race because you haven't nominated him'." Instead With Approval was entered in the Display Stakes on the dirt and won by a head.

=== 1989: three-year-old season ===
With Approval started his three-year-old campaign at Gulfstream Park with a fifth-place finish in an allowance race on February 2, 1999, then rebounded three weeks later with a win in another allowance. He next finished second in the Tampa Bay Derby on March 19 before finishing sixth in the Flamingo Stakes.

With Approval was then shipped north to Woodbine Racetrack to begin prepping for the Queen's Plate, finishing second in the Queenston Stakes on May 14 to Domasca Dan. "He was a very proud horse but very frustrating early in his three-year-old year when Domasca Dan beat him in the Queenston," recalled Willmot. "He took the lead at the 3/16 pole and looked like he would win but then he pulled himself up and Domasca Dan beat him. On the dirt he was a tricky horse to ride so Donnie (jockey Don Seymour) learned very quickly that he had to wait until very late in the race to take the lead with him or he would do what his grandsire (Buckpasser) did." With Approval was next entered in the Marine Stakes on June 11 and then the Plate Trial Stakes on June 25, in both cases winning by a head.

The Queen's Plate is Canada's most prestigious race for three-year-olds and is also the first leg of the Canadian Triple Crown. With Queen Elizabeth the Queen Mother in attendance, With Approval entered the race as the favorite in a field of fifteen. He raced near the back of the pack in the early going while trapped on the inside by other horses. He started making up ground down the backstretch and passed the early leaders, then dueled down the stretch with Most Valiant. "I remember that (Hall of Fame trainer) Charlie Whittingham was there in the box next to us as we watched," said Willmot. "Between Most Valiant and With Approval you just couldn't tell who won, it was that close a finish. Of course, Charlie had seen a few races and while we were there fretting about did he get up and did he win it, Whittingham looked over and said, 'grey horse won it'!"

In the second leg of the Canadian Triple Crown, the Prince of Wales Stakes at Fort Erie Racetrack, With Approval was again the favorite. As expected, Domasca Dan set the early pace but this time With Approval stayed much closer to the pace to keep the pressure on the front runner. Entering the stretch, Most Valiant, who had been running to the outside of With Approval, moved to the inside and pulled into the lead. With Approval then started his move on the outside, and the three horses dueled down the stretch. Domasca Dan inched back into the lead, but With Approval kept closing, pulling ahead in the final strides to win by a head. "That's just the way he is," said Seymour. "When it comes down to the last 70 yards, that's when you've got to keep busy on him and make sure that he's paying attention. If you ask him a little too early from the eighth pole to the sixteenth pole, he'll relax on you, he'll think it's all over when he gets a head in front. This time I just decided to sit as long as I can until it's time to move. When I did make my move, I didn't miss a stride, I don't think."

The Canadian Triple Crown had not been won since Canebora in 1963. To raise interest in the series, the Bank of Montreal introduced a $1 million bonus in 1989 to any horse who could sweep the three races. Attfield was optimistic about With Approval's chances, feeling that the colt would improve when switching from the dirt surface on which he had won the first two legs of the Crown to the turf course over which the final race, the Breeders' Stakes, is run. With Approval had run on turf once before, in his first race, and had won by two lengths. "He's been training super," said Attfield. "He's in unbelievably good shape. He couldn't be better." With Approval rewarded Attfield's confidence with a seven-and-a-half-length victory in the Breeders' Stakes.

With Approval was injured after the Breeders' Stakes and finished the season with six wins and two second-place finishes from ten starts. He was named the Canadian Horse of the Year and Champion three-year-old. Kinghaven Farms, Roger Attfield and Don Seymour also earned Sovereign Awards for outstanding owner/breeder, trainer and jockey respectively.

=== 1990: four-year-old season ===
After a long layoff, With Approval returned to the racetrack on March 7, 1990, finishing sixth in an allowance race at Gulfstream Park. He then won an allowance race at Keeneland on April 24 before finishing ninth in the Pimlico Special on May 12. With Approval then headed north to win the Connaught Cup Stakes at Woodbine on June 3.

He was then shipped to Belmont Park for the Bowling Green Handicap on June 17. He raced in third place for the first mile, then moved to the lead on the final turn, drawing away down the stretch to win by 1 1/2 lengths. His time of 2:10.26 for 1 3/8 miles on turf was not only a stakes record, but established a world record. As of December 2016, it remains the official North America record for the distance.

With Approval followed up with a 1 1/4-length win over Alwuhush in the Tidal Handicap on July 7, setting another stakes record. He then finished second behind El Senor in the Sword Dancer Handicap on July 28 before winning an allowance race at Woodbine on August 18. This was his final prep for the Arlington Million, in which he faced a strong field including 1989 Million winner Steinlen and 1989 Breeders' Cup Turf winner Prized. With Approval beat both of these but was caught in the final strides by Golden Pheasant. "Inside the eighth-pole, I said to myself, 'It's all yours'," said jockey Craig Perret. "Then I saw Golden Pheasant coming from the outside. We just couldn't keep up."

With Approval returned to Belmont Park for the Turf Classic Handicap on October 7, finishing third in another close finish to Caoethes. He made his last start in the Breeders' Cup Turf on October 27, facing a top-quality field of horses from around the world that included Saumarez, winner of the Prix de l'Arc de Triomphe, Golden Pheasant, Caoethes, Belmez, Alwuhush, and El Senor. Before the race, Attfield was more concerned about the weather. "The rain will really bother this horse," he said. "He likes a rock-hard turf course. Before, we have pulled him out when the course has come up too soft, but you can't do that in this case. I know the course will be soft; I just hope it won't be too soft." After trailing early, With Approval took the lead coming down the stretch but was caught by French-based In the Wings in the final strides. "He ran a strong, powerful race," said Perret. "He ran really tough down the lane. He just got beat in the last 70 yards."

With Approval finished the year with five wins, three seconds, and a third from eleven starts. Because he spent most of the year racing in the United States, With Approval was not eligible for Sovereign Award voting in 1990, which requires that a horse race three times in Canada.

In 1993, With Approval was inducted into the Canadian Horse Racing Hall of Fame.

== Retirement ==
With Approval was retired from racing after the 1990 season and sent to stud at Live Oak Stud near Ocala, Florida. In 2006, he was acquired by Landwades Stud in Moulton, Suffolk, United Kingdom, where he stood until his death.

As a stallion, he sired Talkin Man, the 1994 Canadian Champion 2-Year-Old Colt and 1995 Wood Memorial Stakes winner who in turn sired Better Talk Now, the 2004 winner of the Breeders' Cup Turf. He is the damsire of Miesque's Approval, winner of the 2006 Breeders' Cup Mile.

With Approval was euthanized on June 21, 2010 due to the infirmities of old age.

== Pedigree ==
Pedigree of With Approval (CAN), gray horse, foaled May 9, 1986
Sire Caro (IRE) gray, 1967	Fortino II (FR) gray, 1959	Grey Sovereign (GB)	Nasrullah (GB)
Sire Caro (IRE) gray, 1967	Fortino II (FR) gray, 1959	Grey Sovereign (GB)	Kong (GB)
Sire Caro (IRE) gray, 1967	Fortino II (FR) gray, 1959	Ranavalo III (FR)	Relic
Sire Caro (IRE) gray, 1967	Fortino II (FR) gray, 1959	Ranavalo III (FR)	Navarra (ITY)
Sire Caro (IRE) gray, 1967	Chambord (GB) chestnut, 1955	Chamossaire (GB)	Precipitation (GB)
Sire Caro (IRE) gray, 1967	Chambord (GB) chestnut, 1955	Chamossaire (GB)	Snowberry (GB)
Sire Caro (IRE) gray, 1967	Chambord (GB) chestnut, 1955	Life Hill (GB)	Solario (GB)
Sire Caro (IRE) gray, 1967	Chambord (GB) chestnut, 1955	Life Hill (GB)	Lady of the Snows (GB)
Dam Passing Mood (CAN) chestnut, 1978	Buckpasser bay, 1963	Tom Fool	Menow
Dam Passing Mood (CAN) chestnut, 1978	Buckpasser bay, 1963	Tom Fool	Gaga
Dam Passing Mood (CAN) chestnut, 1978	Buckpasser bay, 1963	Busanda	War Admiral
Dam Passing Mood (CAN) chestnut, 1978	Buckpasser bay, 1963	Busanda	Businesslike
Dam Passing Mood (CAN) chestnut, 1978	Cool Mood (CAN) chestnut, 1966	Northern Dancer (CAN)	Nearctic (CAN)
Dam Passing Mood (CAN) chestnut, 1978	Cool Mood (CAN) chestnut, 1966	Northern Dancer (CAN)	Natalma
Dam Passing Mood (CAN) chestnut, 1978	Cool Mood (CAN) chestnut, 1966	Happy Mood	Mahmoud (FR)
Dam Passing Mood (CAN) chestnut, 1978	Cool Mood (CAN) chestnut, 1966	Happy Mood	La Reigh (family: 2-n)
