= Larry Adams (jockey) =

American jockey

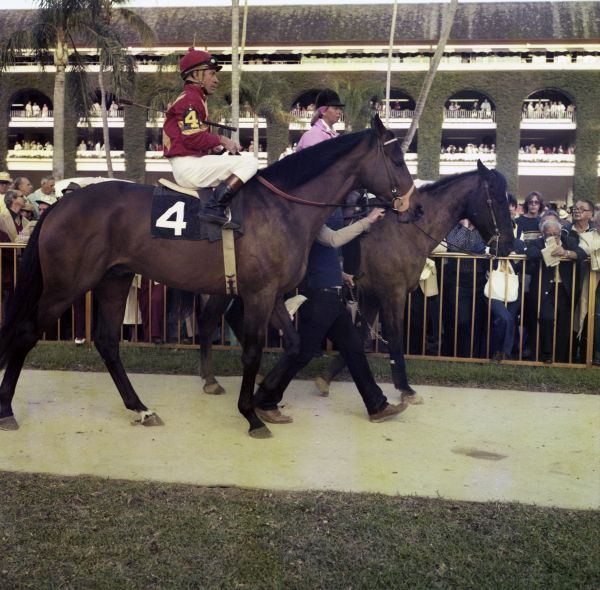
- Larry Adams with "Father Hogan" at Hialeah, February 25, 1978

Personal information
- Born: June 13, 1936 Shreveport, Louisiana, U.S.
- Died: February 27, 2000 (aged 63)
- Occupation: Jockey

Horse racing career
- Sport: Horse racing

Major racing wins
- Carter Handicap (1960, 1980); John B. Campbell Handicap (1960); Excelsior Stakes (1961); Schuylerville Stakes (1961); Westchester Handicap (1961, 1966); Bay Shore Stakes (1962); Bed O' Roses Handicap (1962); Black-Eyed Susan Stakes (1962); Black Helen Handicap (1962); Delaware Handicap (1962); Discovery Handicap (1962); Flamingo Stakes (1962); Hutcheson Stakes (1962, 1964); Jersey Derby (1962); Gallant Fox Handicap (1963); Gotham Stakes (1963); Sapling Stakes (1963); Sheepshead Bay Stakes (1963); Vagrancy Handicap (1963); Youthful Stakes (1963); Matron Stakes (1964); Mother Goose Stakes (1964); New York Stakes (1964, 1966, 1969); Alcibiades Stakes (1965); Fashion Stakes (1965); Gallorette Handicap (1965); Gardenia Stakes (1965); National Stallion Stakes (filly division) (1965); Selima Stakes (1965); Spinaway Stakes (1965); Vosburgh Stakes (1965, 1970); Astoria Stakes (1966); Bernard Baruch Handicap (1966, 1968); Bowling Green Handicap (1966); Man o' War Stakes (1966); Miss Woodford Stakes (1966); Palm Beach Handicap (1966); Princess Elizabeth Stakes (1966); United Nations Stakes (1966); Round Table Handicap (1967); Remsen Stakes (1968); Dwyer Stakes (1969); Queens County Handicap (1969, 1970); Barbara Fritchie Handicap (1970); Canadian Turf Handicap (1970); Politely Stakes (1970); Test Stakes (1970); Haskell Invitational Handicap (1971); Toboggan Handicap (1971); Gulfstream Park Handicap (1973); Illinois Derby (1973); Derby Trial Stakes (1973); Philip H. Iselin Stakes (1973); New Orleans Handicap (1974); Little Silver Handicap (1978)

Racing awards
- Pimlico Champion Jockey (1959)

Significant horses
- Assagai, Cicada, Drumtop, Go Marching, Moccasin, Process Shot, R. Thomas
- Updated on July 4, 2021

Larry Adams (June 13, 1936 – February 27, 2000) was an American jockey who was active from 1960 until 1983. He rode in the Kentucky Derby five times, achieving third place riding High Echelon on May 2, 1970. His greatest successes came in 1965–1966 when he was the favored mount for a horse named Moccasin. From August 6 until November 6, 1965, Moccasin, trained by Harry Trotsek, had a streak of eight wins in a row while ridden by Adams. In 1974, at the age of 38, Adams was denied a jockey's license by the New York State Racing and Wagering Board. His license request was rejected due to his failure to mention on his license application that he had two prior arrests. He was reinstated as a licensed jockey after a lengthy suspension.
