= Commanche Run =

British-bred Thoroughbred racehorse ((1981–2005)

- Racing silks of Mr Ivan Allan
- Sire: Run the Gantlet
- Grandsire: Tom Rolfe
- Dam: Volley
- Damsire: Ratification
- Sex: Stallion
- Foaled: 1981
- Country: Great Britain
- Colour: Bay
- Breeder: Majors Racing International
- Owner: Ivan Allan
- Trainer: Luca Cumani
- Record: 14: 7-2-3
- Earnings: $607,912

Major wins
- March Stakes (1984); Gordon Stakes (1984); St Leger (1984); Brigadier Gerard Stakes (1985); Benson & Hedges Gold Cup (1985); Irish Champion Stakes (1985)

Awards
- Timeform rating: 133
- Last updated on 27 September 2025

Commanche Run (1981– March 2005) was a British Thoroughbred racehorse and sire. He was a versatile top-class colt who won a number of Group One races at from one and a quarter to one and three-quarter miles in the 1980s, including the 1984 St Leger.

== Background ==
Bred in England, he was out of the mare, Volley. His sire was Run the Gantlet, an American multiple Grade I winner and successful sire. He was purchased and raced by Ivan Allan, an owner and preeminent trainer in Asian horse racing for many years. He was trained at Bedford House Stables in Newmarket, Suffolk by Luca Cumani.

== Racing career ==
Commanche Run made his racing debut on 13 October 1983 with second-place finish at Newmarket Racecourse. He next started at age three in May 1984 at York Racecourse, in the Group 2 Dante Stakes, a major trial for the Derby, finishing tenth. He then got his first win twelve days later on 28 May at Doncaster Racecourse. Moving up in company, the colt ran third in the 1984 King Edward VII Stakes at Royal Ascot and the Princess of Wales's Stakes at Newmarket’s July Meeting. Commanche Run then was aimed at the Gordon at Goodwood racecourse. Luca Cumani’s stable jockey Darrell McHargue was suspended and was replaced by Lester Piggott. Ridden positively close to the leaders for the first time, Commanche Run took the lead three furlongs out and won impressively from Shernazar. With McHargue back in the saddle he won the March Stakes also at Goodwood later that month. Shortly before the St. Leger at Doncaster, McHargue was replaced by Piggott at the owner Ivan Allen’s instigation. The horse also suffered an injury scare in the days running up to the race. Always close up, Commanche Run took the lead four furlongs from home and won by a neck from Baynoun with Alphabatim in third.

At four Commanche Run was always ridden by Piggott and he went on to win two Group One races, capturing the Benson & Hedges Gold Cup and the Irish Champion Stakes, making three in total with the Classic, the St. Leger Stakes. He had also been a runaway winner of the Group 3 Brigadier Gerard Stakes at Sandown Park on his first run of the year. He was then third in the Prince of Wales’s Stakes after a duel with the top-class filly Pebbles which saw them beaten by an outsider Bob Back. Commanche Run was withdrawn before the start of the Eclipse Stakes at Sandown Park in early July, and the injury he had sustained there prevented him from running in the King George VI and Queen Elizabeth Diamond Stakes in late July.

In the Benson and Hedges Gold Cup at York he was ridden from the front by Piggott and beat a strong field, including the fillies Triple Crown winner Oh So Sharp and multiple Group 1 winning filly Triptych, with Palace Music the winner of the previous year’s Champion Stakes, and Bob Back well behind.

== Stud career ==
Retired to stud duty at Coolmore Stud in Ireland, Commanche Run met with limited success. In 1999 he was transferred to Astley Grange Stud in Leicestershire where he died in March 2005. The sire of a number of steeplechase runners, he got fifteen stakes winners in all. His best flat racing runner was Lord Weinstock's colt Bonny Scot whose wins included the Great Voltigeur Stakes and the Gordon Stakes at Goodwood.

== Pedigree ==
Pedigree of Commanche Run (GB), bay stallion, 1981
Sire Run the Gantlet (USA) 1968	Tom Rolfe; 1962	Ribot	Tenerani
Sire Run the Gantlet (USA) 1968	Tom Rolfe; 1962	Ribot	Romanella
Sire Run the Gantlet (USA) 1968	Tom Rolfe; 1962	Pocahontas	Roman
Sire Run the Gantlet (USA) 1968	Tom Rolfe; 1962	Pocahontas	How*
Sire Run the Gantlet (USA) 1968	First Feather; 1963	First Landing	Turn-To
Sire Run the Gantlet (USA) 1968	First Feather; 1963	First Landing	Hildene
Sire Run the Gantlet (USA) 1968	First Feather; 1963	Quill	Princequillo*
Sire Run the Gantlet (USA) 1968	First Feather; 1963	Quill	Quick Touch
Dam Volley (GB) 1965	Ratification; 1953	Court Martial	Fair Trial
Dam Volley (GB) 1965	Ratification; 1953	Court Martial	Instantaneous
Dam Volley (GB) 1965	Ratification; 1953	Solesa	Solario
Dam Volley (GB) 1965	Ratification; 1953	Solesa	Mesa
Dam Volley (GB) 1965	Mitrailleuse; 1944	Mieuxce	Massine
Dam Volley (GB) 1965	Mitrailleuse; 1944	Mieuxce	L'Olivete
Dam Volley (GB) 1965	Mitrailleuse; 1944	French Kin	Brantome
Dam Volley (GB) 1965	Mitrailleuse; 1944	French Kin	Keener (Family:16-h)

* Commanche Run is inbred 5S x 4S to the stallion Princequillo, meaning that he appears fifth generation (via How) and fourth generation on the sire side of his pedigree.
