= Assagai (horse) =

American-bred Thoroughbred racehorse

- Sire: Warfare
- Grandsire: Determine
- Dam: Primary
- Damsire: Petition
- Sex: Stallion
- Foaled: 1963
- Country: United States
- Colour: Dark Bay
- Breeder: Robin F. Scully
- Owner: Cragwood Stable
- Trainer: MacKenzie Miller
- Record: 30: 11-7-2
- Earnings: $344,921

Major wins
- Bernard Baruch Handicap (1966); Long Branch Stakes (1966); United Nations Handicap (1966); Tidal Handicap (1966); Man O' War Stakes (1966); Long Island Handicap (1967)

Awards
- United States Champion Male Turf Horse (1966)
- Last updated on July 3, 2007

Assagai (1963–1986) was an American Thoroughbred racehorse.

== Background ==
Assagai was a bay horse bred in Kentucky, he was sired by Warfare and out of the mare, Primary. Purchased by the international business tycoon Charles W. Engelhard, Jr., he was trained by future U.S. Racing Hall of Fame inductee, MacKenzie Miller.

== Racing career ==
At age three, Assagai was the top turf horse in the U.S. whose wins in 1966 in the United Nations Handicap at Atlantic City Race Course and Man o' War Stakes at Aqueduct Racetrack resulted in him being voted the Eclipse Award for Outstanding Male Turf Horse.

Sent back to the track at age four, Assagai's most important win of 1967 came in the Long Island Handicap. He also finished second to Poker in the 1967 Bowling Green Handicap but ahead of the future U.S. Racing Hall of Fame Champion, Buckpasser.

== Stud record ==
Retired to stud duty, Assagai met with some success. His son Big Whippendeal won the G1 Century Handicap at Hollywood Park and another of his colts, Almost Grown, won the Hawthorne Gold Cup Handicap at Hawthorne Race Course near Chicago.

In 1986, at Clear Creek Stud in Folsom, Louisiana, the twenty-three-year-old Assagai was humanely euthanized due to laminitis.
