= Jeffrey Fell =

Canadian jockey

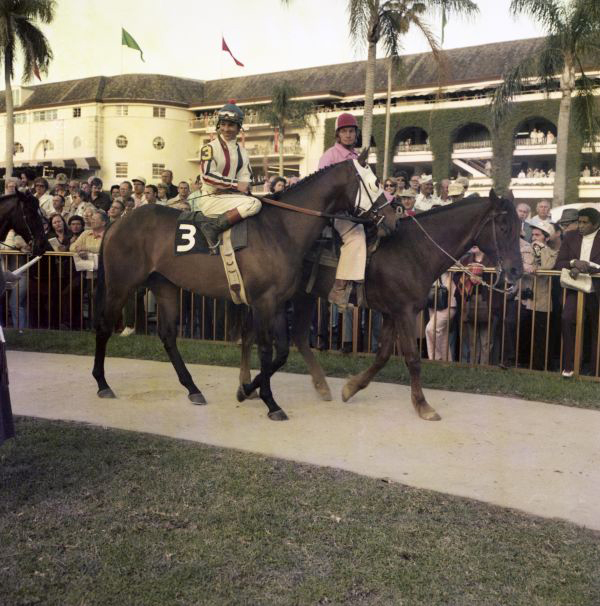
- Jeffrey Fell with "Centennial Pride" at the Hialeah Racetrack, 1978

Personal information
- Born: June 20, 1956 (age 70) Hamilton, Ontario, Canada
- Occupation: Jockey

Horse racing career
- Sport: Horse racing
- Career wins: 2,637

Major racing wins
- Display Stakes (1974, 1976); Grey Stakes (1974, 1984); Cup and Saucer Stakes (1975, 1976, 1984); Plate Trial Stakes (1976, 1986); Sir Barton Stakes (1976, 1984); Canadian Oaks (1976); Marine Stakes (1976, 1977); Seaway Stakes (1976, 1977); Arlington Classic (1978); Bowling Green Handicap (1978, 1980); Dwyer Stakes (1978); Frizette Stakes (1978); Jamaica Handicap (1978); Juvenile Stakes (1978); Tidal Handicap (1978); Top Flight Handicap (1978); Alabama Stakes (1979); Bed O' Roses Handicap (1979); Carter Handicap (1979); Cornhusker Handicap (1979); Donn Handicap (1979); Fashion Stakes (1979); Hempstead Handicap (1979); Jim Dandy Stakes (1979, 1980); Manhattan Handicap (1979); Roamer Handicap (1979); Whitney Handicap (1979); Widener Handicap (1979); Ashland Stakes (1980); Bahamas Stakes (1980); Brooklyn Handicap (1980); Gulfstream Park Handicap (1980); Suburban Handicap (1980); Marlboro Cup (1980); Mother Goose Stakes (1980); Toboggan Handicap (1980); Violet Handicap (1980); Westchester Handicap (1980, 1982); Youthful Stakes (1980); Astoria Stakes (1981); Blue Grass Stakes (1981); Champagne Stakes (1981); Flower Bowl Invitational Stakes (1981); Wood Memorial Stakes (1981); Arkansas Derby (1982); Flamingo Stakes (1982); Florida Derby (1982); Spinaway Stakes (1982); Travers Stakes (1982); Yankee Handicap (1982); Coronation Futurity (1984); Summer Stakes (1984); Tampa Bay Derby (1985) Canadian Classic Race wins: Queen's Plate (1976); Prince of Wales Stakes (1976)

Racing awards
- Canadian Outstanding Apprentice Jockey (1975); Leading jockey at Woodbine Racetrack (1975, 1976, 1977, 1984, 1985); Leading jockey at Hialeah Park (2x); Avelino Gomez Memorial Award (1989)

Honours
- Canadian Horse Racing Hall of Fame (1993)

Significant horses
- Alydar, Dauphin Fabuleux, It's In The Air, Jumping Hill, Norcliffe, Northernette, Pearl Necklace, Pleasant Colony, Plugged Nickle, Princess Rooney, Runaway Groom, Tiller Timely Writer, Winter's Tale
- Updated on June 26, 2021

Jeffrey J. Fell (born June 20, 1956, in Hamilton, Ontario, Canada) is a retired jockey and a Canadian Horse Racing Hall of Fame inductee who was also a successful rider in the United States.

On June 17, 1978, Jeffrey Fell rode Tiller to victory in the Bowling Green Handicap in which the Belmont Park turf course record was broken with a time of 2:13 flat for the mile and three-eighths. At the same racetrack, on July 2 Fell was again aboard Tiller for the win in the Tidal Handicap with a time of 2:13 3/5 for the mile and three-eighths.
