= David A. Whiteley =

American Thoroughbred horse racing trainer (1944–2017)

Personal information
- Born: October 21, 1944 Easton, Maryland, USA
- Died: August 13, 2017 (aged 72) Camden, South Carolina, USA
- Occupation: Trainer

Horse racing career
- Sport: Horse racing
- Career wins: 678

Major racing wins
- Miss Woodford Stakes (1971); Saranac Stakes (1972, 1977); Go For Wand Handicap (1974); San Gabriel Handicap (1973); San Juan Capistrano Handicap (1974, 1979); San Luis Obispo Handicap (1974); San Luis Rey Handicap (1974); Prioress Stakes (1975); San Pasqual Handicap (1975); Withers Stakes (1975); Chick Lang Stakes (1976); Coaching Club American Oaks (1976); Cotillion Handicap (1976); Gazelle Stakes (1976); Gotham Stakes (1976); Monmouth Oaks (1976); Ruffian Handicap (1976); Sword Dancer Invitational Handicap (1976, 1980); Dwyer Stakes (1977, 1979); Bowling Green Handicap (1978); Fort Marcy Handicap (1978); Nashua Stakes (1978); Red Smith Handicap (1978, 1979, 1982); Remsen Stakes (1978); Test Stakes (1978, 1979); Top Flight Handicap (1978, 1979); Beldame Stakes (1979); Haskell Invitational Handicap (1979); Peter Pan Stakes (1979); San Antonio Handicap (1979); San Marcos Stakes (1979); Santa Ana Handicap (1979); Santa Barbara Handicap (1979); Wood Memorial Stakes (1979); Diana Stakes (1980); Dixie Stakes (1980, 1983); Flower Bowl Invitational Stakes (1980); Man o' War Stakes (1980); New York Stakes (1980); Royal Palm Handicap (1980); Suwannee River Stakes (1980, 1983); Everglades Stakes (1981); Shuvee Handicap (1982); Brooklyn Handicap (1983); Delaware Handicap (1983); Marlboro Cup Invitational Handicap (1983) American Classic Race wins: Belmont Stakes (1979)

Honours
- U.S. Racing Hall of Fame (2026)

Significant horses
- Coastal, Astray, Highland Blade, Just A Game, Northernette, Revidere, Tiller, Waya

David Anders Whiteley (October 21, 1944 - August 13, 2017) was an American Thoroughbred horse racing trainer who trained three Champions and who in 1979 won the third leg of the U.S. Triple Crown.

The son of U.S. Racing Hall of Fame inductee Frank Y. Whiteley, Jr. who trained the great filly Ruffian, David grew up in the industry. In a career that began in 1970 he won 678 races, including 45 graded stakes, until his retirement in 1995.

David Whiteley's win with Coastal in the 1979 Belmont Stakes ended the Triple Crown hopes of Spectacular Bid.

His three Champions were all female horses:

1. Revidere, 1976 American Champion Three-Year-Old Filly for William Haggin Perry
2. Waya, 1979 American Champion Older Female Horse for Peter M. Brant and George W. Strawbridge, Jr.
3. Just A Game, 1980 American Champion Female Turf Horse for owners Peter M. Brant and H. Joseph Allen

David A. Whiteley died at his home in Camden, South Carolina on August 13, 2017.
