= J. Elliott Burch =

American horse trainer

Elliott Burch
- Burch with Sword Dancer on the Sports Illustrated issue cover dated February 22, 1960

Personal information
- Born: March 3, 1924 United States
- Died: January 30, 2011 (aged 86)
- Occupation: Trainer

Horse racing career
- Sport: Horse racing
- Career wins: Not found

Major racing wins
- Saranac Stakes (1950, 1951, 1953); Whitney Handicap (1955, 1972, 1980, 1982); Acorn Stakes (1958, 1961); Jockey Club Gold Cup (1959, 1969); Metropolitan Handicap (1959, 1969, 1979); Monmouth Handicap (1959); Top Flight Handicap (1959, 1968, 1969); Travers Stakes (1959, 1964, 1969, 1972); Woodward Stakes (1959, 1960, 1969, 1972); Gardenia Stakes (1960); National Stallion Stakes (filly division) (1960); Suburban Handicap (1960, 1973, 1979, 1982); Coaching Club American Oaks (1961, 1972); Spinster Stakes (1961, 1974); Marguerite Stakes (1962); Dwyer Stakes (1964); Lawrence Realization Stakes (1964); Wood Memorial Stakes (1964); Prioress Stakes (1967); Washington, D.C. International Stakes (1967, 1970, 1971); Blue Grass Stakes (1969); Black Helen Handicap (1969); Firenze Handicap (1969, 1984); Hollywood Invitational Turf Handicap (1969); Bowling Green Handicap (1970, 1972, 1973); Man o' War Handicap (1970, 1971); United Nations Handicap (1970, 1971); Governor Stakes (1971); Alabama Stakes (1972); Brooklyn Handicap (1972); Derby Trial Stakes (1972); Monmouth Oaks (1972); Royal Palm Handicap (1972); Withers Stakes (1972); Excelsior Handicap (1973); Sport Page Handicap (1973); San Juan Capistrano Handicap (1976); Test Stakes (1976) American Classic Race wins: Belmont Stakes (1959, 1964, 1969)

Racing awards
- U.S. Champion Trainer by earnings (1969)

Honours
- United States' Racing Hall of Fame (1980)

Significant horses
- Sword Dancer, Bowl of Flowers, Quadrangle; Fort Marcy, Run the Gantlet, Arts and Letters; Key to the Mint, State Dinner, Silver Buck

John Elliott Burch (March 3, 1924 – January 30, 2011) was an American Horse trainer who worked with Thoroughbred racehorses. He was inducted into the National Museum of Racing and Hall of Fame, and four of his horses were also inducted by the same organization.

== Biography ==
Known by Elliott, he is the son of Preston M. Burch and grandson of William P. Burch who were both Hall of Fame trainers. He served with the United States Army Signal Corps in World War II.

A graduate of Lawrenceville School, Yale University and the University of Kentucky, Elliott Burch worked as a sports writer for the Daily Racing Form before going to work for his father in 1955 at Isabel Dodge Sloane's Brookmeade Stable. In 1957 he took over from his father as head trainer for whom he would have considerable success. The most famous of his Brookmeade horses was 1959 American Horse of the Year and Hall of Fame inductee, Sword Dancer. Elliott Burch and Sword Dancer were on the cover of the February 22, 1960 issue of Sports Illustrated.

In 1966 he went to work for Paul Mellon's Rokeby Stables where he remained until 1977. For Rokeby, he conditioned four Champions including the 1969 American Horse of the Year and Hall of Fame inductee, Arts and Letters and Fort Marcy, a Hall of Fame inductee and a five-time Eclipse Award winner including American Co-Champion Horse of the Year. Burch went on to train for the stable of Sonny Whitney for whom he won a number of important stakes races including the 1982 Suburban Handicap with Silver Buck in which he set a new Belmont Park track record of 1:59.60 for 1 1/4 miles.

== Triple Crown ==
Elliott Burch had four horses who ran in the Kentucky Derby. His best results were a second-place finish in 1959 (Sword Dancer) and again in 1969 (Arts and Letters). He also trained four Preakness Stakes runners, finishing second in 1959 (Sword Dancer) and 1969 (Arts and Letters), third in 1972 (Key To The Mint), and fourth in 1964 (Quadrangle).

In the Belmont Stakes, Burch won three times from the five years in which he had an entrant. He won with Sword Dancer in 1959, with Quadrangle in 1964 when he thwarted Northern Dancer's bid for the 1964 Triple Crown, and his third Belmont in 1969 with Arts and Letters.

In the pre-Breeders Cup era, Burch won such fall classics as the Washington, D.C. International Stakes in 1967, 1970, and 1971 and the Travers Stakes in 1959, 1964, 1969, and 1972.

=== Horses trained ===
- Sword Dancer
  - U.S. Champion 3-Yr-Old Colt (1959)
  - U.S. Champion Male Handicap Horse (1959)
  - American Horse of the Year (1959)
  - United States Racing Hall of Fame (1977)
- Bowl of Flowers
  - U.S. Champion two-year-old filly (1960)
  - U.S. Champion three-year-old filly (1961)
  - United States' Racing Hall of Fame (2004)
- Fort Marcy
  - American Champion Male Turf Horse (1967, 1970)
  - American Co-Champion Male Turf Horse (1968)
  - American Champion Older Male Horse (1970)
  - American Co-Champion Horse of the Year (1970)
  - United States Racing Hall of Fame (1998)
- Arts and Letters
  - U.S. Champion 3-Yr-Old Colt (1969)
  - U.S. Champion Handicap Male Horse (1969)
  - American Horse of the Year (1969)
  - United States Racing and Hall of Fame (1994)
- Run the Gantlet
  - American Champion Male Turf Horse (1971)
- Key to the Mint
  - U.S. Champion 3-Yr-Old Colt (1972)

In 1980, Elliott Burch was inducted in the National Museum of Racing and Hall of Fame. He retired after the 1985 campaign, having won three American Classic Races and the trainer of six Champions who won fifteen titles including three Horse of the Year honors.

Elliott Burch died in a Newport, Rhode Island hospital at age eighty-six following complications from pneumonia.
