= Fort Marcy (horse) =

American-bred Thoroughbred racehorse

- Sire: Amerigo
- Grandsire: Nearco
- Dam: Key Bridge
- Damsire: Princequillo
- Sex: Gelding
- Foaled: 1964
- Country: United States
- Colour: Bay
- Breeder: Paul Mellon
- Owner: Rokeby Stables
- Trainer: J. Elliott Burch
- Record: 75: 21-18-14
- Earnings: $1,109,791

Major wins
- Long Branch Stakes (1967); Washington, D.C. International (1967 & 1970); Bernard Baruch Handicap (1967); Tidal Handicap (1967, 1969); Sunset Handicap (1968); Stars and Stripes Handicap (1968); Hollywood Invitational Turf Handicap (1969); United Nations Handicap (1970); Man O' War Stakes (1970); Bowling Green Handicap (1970)

Awards
- American Champion Male Turf Horse (1967, 1970); TRA American Champion Male Turf Horse (1968); DRF American Champion Older Male Horse (1970); DRF American Horse of the Year (1970)

Honours
- United States Racing Hall of Fame (1998) #86 - Top 100 U.S. Racehorses of the 20th Century; Fort Marcy Handicap at Aqueduct Racetrack
- Last updated on September 17, 2007

Fort Marcy (April 2, 1964 – August 14, 1991) was an American Thoroughbred racehorse. He was a bay gelding, by Amerigo out of Key Bridge, by Princequillo. His grandsire was the important Italian horse Nearco.

In 1970 Fort Marcy earned three Champion titles. He was named Horse of the Year in a poll by the publishers of Daily Racing Form, receiving 21 of the 42 votes ahead of Personality (10 votes) and Ta Wee (9 votes). Personality won a rival poll conducted by the Thoroughbred Racing Association. Fort Marcy competed for six years until his retirement at the end of the 1971 racing season.

He died in 1991 at Rokeby Farm in Upperville, Virginia. In 1998, he was voted into the National Museum of Racing and Hall of Fame, in Saratoga Springs, New York.
