= MacKenzie Miller =

American racehorse trainer

MacKenzie Todd Miller
Personal information
- Full name: MacKenzie Todd Miller
- Born: October 16, 1921 Versailles, Kentucky, United States
- Died: December 10, 2010 (aged 89) Lexington, Kentucky, United States
- Occupation: Trainer/Owner/Breeder

Horse racing career
- Sport: Horse racing
- Career wins: 1,103

Major racing wins
- Champlain Handicap (1955); Arlington Lassie Stakes (1956); Astoria Stakes (1956); Alcibiades Stakes (1956); Falls City Handicap (1957); John A. Morris Handicap (1959, 1974, 1975, 1993); Matron Stakes (1960); Bernard Baruch Handicap (1966, 1969 (2), 1971, 1973 (2), 1990); United Nations Handicap (1966, 1969, 1974, 1981, 1984); Long Island Handicap (1967, 1969, 1970, 1974, 1976); Round Table Handicap (1967, 1969); Lamplighter Handicap (1968); Jerome Handicap (1969, 1982); Man o' War Handicap (1969, 1975); Roamer Handicap (1970); Tremont Stakes (1970, 1992); Hopeful Stakes (1971, 1987); Breeders' Futurity Stakes (1971); Whitney Handicap (1971, 1987); Lawrence Realization Stakes (1972, 1974, 1985); Salvator Mile Handicap (1972); Del Mar Handicap (1973); Governor Stakes (1973); Metropolitan Handicap (1973, 1984); Red Smith Handicap (1973, 1984, 1991); Toboggan Handicap (1973); Manhattan Handicap (1975, 1986); Bowling Green Handicap (1975); Peter Pan Stakes (1976); Diana Handicap (1977, 1984, 1988, 1989); Suburban Handicap (1978, 1980, 1983, 1984); Brooklyn Handicap (1980, 1984); Marlboro Cup Invitational Handicap (1980, 1987); Flower Bowl Invitational Stakes (1981); Travers Stakes (1987, 1993); Bowling Green Handicap (1984); Comely Stakes (1984); Lexington Stakes (1985); Saratoga Special Stakes (1987); Belmont Futurity Stakes (1990); Champagne Stakes (1992); Laurel Dash Stakes (1993); Top Flight Handicap (1993); New York Stakes (1994) International race wins: Canadian International Stakes (1975); Prix d'Aumale (1982, 1983) American Classic Race wins: Kentucky Derby (1993)

Honors
- National Museum of Racing and Hall of Fame (1987)

Significant horses
- Assagai, Fit to Fight, Java Gold, Halo, Hawaii, Leallah, Red Ransom, Sea Hero, Snow Knight, Tentam, Winter's Tale

MacKenzie "Mack" Todd Miller (October 16, 1921 – December 10, 2010) was an American Thoroughbred racehorse trainer and owner/breeder. During his forty-six-year career, he conditioned seventy-two stakes winners, including four Eclipse Award champions.

== Education and military service ==
Mack Miller grew up near the Keeneland Race Course, and attended its first race in 1936. He studied at the Bolles School in Jacksonville, Florida then at the University of Kentucky but interrupted his education to serve with the United States Army Air Forces during World War II. After the war's end, in 1947 he went to work as a stable hand for Calumet Farm. He became involved with conditioning horses, and took out his training license in 1949.

== Hall of Fame training career ==
Miller trained 1974 Epsom Derby winner Snow Knight who had been purchased by E. P. Taylor; Snow Knight was selected 1975's American Champion Male Turf Horse. Miller also trained for Charles W. Engelhard, Jr. He was then hired by Paul Mellon for his Rokeby Stables. He and Mellon had their first Kentucky Derby win in 1993 with Sea Hero. Among their other successes, Winter's Tale won the 1980 Brooklyn Handicap, the Suburban Handicap, and the Marlboro Cup Invitational Handicap. In 1984, Fit to Fight won the New York Handicap Triple, a feat accomplished just three times in the near one hundred years that the three races existed simultaneously. No horse has won the Handicap Triple since.

Miller was inducted in the National Museum of Racing and Hall of Fame in 1987. There is a Mack Miller Exhibit at the Aiken Thoroughbred Racing Hall of Fame and Museum, where he operated a winter training facility for many years before selling to Janice and Robert McNair, the then owners of Stonerside Stable. Other honors he has received include the 1993 Honor Guest at the Thoroughbred Club of America's Testimonial Dinner from the National Turf Writers Association. Following his retirement, he was elected to The Jockey Club in 1997. He was the co-breeder of De La Rose, the 1981 American Champion Female Turf Horse, and Chilukki, the 1999 American Champion Two-Year-Old Filly.

Miller died at the University of Kentucky Hospital. He had been hospitalized on December 5 following a stroke.

== Champions trained by Mack Miller ==
- Leallah – American Champion Two-Year-Old Filly (1956)
- Assagai – American Champion Male Turf Horse (1966)
- Hawaii – American Champion Male Turf Horse (1969)
- Snow Knight – American Champion Male Turf Horse (1975)
- De La Rose – American Champion Female Turf Horse (1981)
- Chilukki – American Champion Two-Year-Old Filly (1999)
