= American Champion Male Turf Horse =

American horse racing award

The American Champion Male Turf Horse award is an American Thoroughbred horse racing honor. The award originated in 1953 when the Daily Racing Form (DRF) named Iceberg II their champion. The Thoroughbred Racing Association (TRA) added the category in 1967. The organisations disagreed only once, in 1968. In 1971 it became part of the Eclipse Awards program and is awarded annually to a Colt or Gelding, regardless of age, for their performance on grass race courses.

The Daily Racing Form, the Thoroughbred Racing Associations, and the National Turf Writers Association all joined forces in 1971 to create the Eclipse Award. From 1953 through 1978 it was awarded to male or female horses although the only female champion was Dahlia in 1974. In 1979 an individual category was created for each of the sexes.

Starting with the 2015 Eclipse Awards it is no longer possible for a Champion Male Turf Horse to also win Champion Older Male Horse, as the latter category is now restricted to horses proficient in dirt or main track races. The last such winner of both awards was Main Sequence in 2014.

== Records ==
Most wins:

- 4 – John Henry (1980, 1981, 1983, 1984)

Most wins by a trainer:

- 6 – Ron McAnally (1980, 1981, 1983, 1984, 1991, 1995)

Most wins by an owner:

- 6 – Godolphin Racing (1999, 2001, 2021, 2022, 2024, 2025)

== Honorees ==
=== Eclipse awards ===
| Year | Horse | Age | Trainer | Owner |
|---|---|---|---|---|
| 2025 | Notable Speech | 4 | Charlie Appleby | Godolphin |
| 2024 | Rebel's Romance | 6 | Charlie Appleby | Godolphin |
| 2023 | Up to the Mark | 4 | Todd A. Pletcher | Repole Stable & St. Elias Stable |
| 2022 | Modern Games (IRE) | 3 | Charlie Appleby | Godolphin |
| 2021 | Yibir (GB) | 3 | Charlie Appleby | Godolphin |
| 2020 | Channel Maker | 6 | William Mott | Wachtel Stable, Gary Barber, R. A. Hill Stable, and Reeves Thoroughbred Racing |
| 2019 | Bricks and Mortar | 5 | Chad C. Brown | Klaravich Stables & William Lawrence |
| 2018 | Stormy Liberal | 6 | Peter Miller | Rockingham Ranch & David A. Bernsen LLC |
| 2017 | World Approval | 5 | Mark E. Casse | Live Oak Plantation |
| 2016 | Flintshire | 7 | Chad Brown | Juddmonte Farms |
| 2015 | Big Blue Kitten | 7 | Chad Brown | Kenneth & Sarah Ramsey |
| 2014 | Main Sequence | 5 | Graham Motion | Flaxman Holdings |
| 2013 | Wise Dan | 6 | Charles Lopresti | Morton Fink |
| 2012 | Wise Dan | 5 | Charles Lopresti | Morton Fink |
| 2011 | Cape Blanco | 4 | Aidan O'Brien | Derrick Smith, Sue Magnier, Michael Tabor, Fitriani Hay |
| 2010 | Gio Ponti | 5 | Christophe Clement | Castleton Lyons |
| 2009 | Gio Ponti | 4 | Christophe Clement | Castleton Lyons |
| 2008 | Conduit | 4 | Michael Stoute | Ballymacoll Stud |
| 2007 | English Channel | 5 | Todd Pletcher | James T. Scatuorchio |
| 2006 | Miesque's Approval | 7 | Martin D. Wolfson | Live Oak Plantation Racing |
| 2005 | Leroidesanimaux | 5 | Robert J. Frankel | T N T Stud |
| 2004 | Kitten's Joy | 3 | Dale Romans | Kenneth & Sarah Ramsey |
| 2003 | High Chaparral | 4 | Aidan O'Brien | Michael Tabor & Sue Magnier |
| 2002 | High Chaparral | 3 | Aidan O'Brien | Michael Tabor & Sue Magnier |
| 2001 | Fantastic Light | 5 | Saeed bin Suroor | Godolphin Racing |
| 2000 | Kalanisi | 4 | Michael Stoute | Aga Khan IV |
| 1999 | Daylami | 5 | Saeed bin Suroor | Godolphin Racing |
| 1998 | Buck's Boy | 5 | P. Noel Hickey | Quarter B Farm |
| 1997 | Chief Bearheart | 4 | Mark Frostad | Sam-Son Farm |
| 1996 | Singspiel | 4 | Michael Stoute | Sheikh Mohammed |
| 1995 | Northern Spur | 4 | Ron McAnally | Charles J. Cella |
| 1994 | Paradise Creek | 5 | William I. Mott | Bertram R. Firestone |
| 1993 | Kotashaan | 5 | Richard E. Mandella | La Presle Farm |
| 1992 | Sky Classic | 5 | James E. Day | Sam-Son Farm |
| 1991 | Tight Spot | 4 | Ron McAnally | Anderson, Winchell & Carradini |
| 1990 | Itsallgreektome | 3 | Wallace Dollase | Jhayare Stables |
| 1989 | Steinlen | 6 | D. Wayne Lukas | Wildenstein Stable |
| 1988 | Sunshine Forever | 3 | John M. Veitch | Darby Dan Farm |
| 1987 | Theatrical | 5 | William I. Mott | Allen E. Paulson |
| 1986 | Manila | 3 | LeRoy Jolley | Bradley M. Shannon |
| 1985 | Cozzene | 5 | Jan H. Nerud | John A. Nerud |
| 1984 | John Henry | 9 | Ron McAnally | Dotsam Stable |
| 1983 | John Henry | 8 | Ron McAnally | Dotsam Stable |
| 1982 | Perrault | 5 | Charles E. Whittingham | Serge Fradkoff & Thierry van Zuylen |
| 1981 | John Henry | 6 | Ron McAnally | Dotsam Stable |
| 1980 | John Henry | 5 | Ron McAnally | Dotsam Stable |
| 1979 | Bowl Game | 5 | John M. Gaver, Jr. | Greentree Stable |
| 1978 | Mac Diarmida | 3 | Flint S. Schulhofer | Jerome M. Torsney |
| 1977 | Johnny D. | 3 | Michael Kay | Dana S. Bray Jr. |
| 1976 | Youth | 3 | Maurice Zilber | Nelson Bunker Hunt |
| 1975 | Snow Knight | 4 | MacKenzie Miller | Windfields Farm |
| 1974 | Dahlia | 4 | Maurice Zilber | Nelson Bunker Hunt |
| 1973 | Secretariat | 3 | Lucien Laurin | Penny Chenery |
| 1972 | Cougar II | 6 | Charles E. Whittingham | Mary F. Jones |
| 1971 | Run the Gantlet | 3 | J. Elliott Burch | Rokeby Stables |

=== Daily Racing Form, Turf & Sport Digest and Thoroughbred Racing Association Awards ===
| Year | Horse | Age | Trainer | Owner |
|---|---|---|---|---|
| 1970 | Fort Marcy | 6 | J. Elliott Burch | Rokeby Stables |
| 1969 | Hawaii | 5 | MacKenzie Miller | Cragwood Stables |
| 1968 | Fort Marcy (TRA) | 4 | J. Elliott Burch | Rokeby Stables |
| 1968 | Dr. Fager (DRF) | 4 | John A. Nerud | William L. McKnight |
| 1967 | Fort Marcy | 3 | J. Elliott Burch | Rokeby Stables |
| 1966 | Assagai | 3 | MacKenzie Miller | Cragwood Stables |
| 1965 | Parka | 7 | Warren A. Croll, Jr. | Pelican Stable (Rachel Carpenter) |
| 1964 | Turbo Jet II | 4 | Frank A. Bonsal | Barclay Stable |
| 1963 | Mongo | 4 | Frank A. Bonsal | Marion duPont Scott |
| 1962 | | | | |
| 1961 | T.V. Lark | 4 | Paul Parker | Chase R. McCoy |
| 1960 | | | | |
| 1959 | Round Table | 5 | William Molter | Brookmeade Stable |
| 1958 | Round Table | 4 | William Molter | Kerr Stable |
| 1957 | Round Table | 3 | William Molter | Brookmeade Stable |
| 1956 | Career Boy | 3 | Sylvester Veitch | Cornelius Vanderbilt Whitney |
| 1955 | St. Vincent | 4 | Vance Longden | George R. Gardiner & Alberta Ranches |
| 1954 | Stan | 4 | Harry Trotsek | Hasty House Farm |
| 1953 | Iceberg II | 5 | Horatio Luro | W. Arnold Hanger |
