= Rokeby Stables =

Thoroughbred racing and breeding operation

Coordinates: 38°57′36″N 77°51′20″W

- Type: Horse breeding/Racing Stable
- Industry: Thoroughbred Horse racing
- Founded: c. 1948
- Headquarters: Upperville, Virginia; United States
- Key people: Paul Mellon, owner Elliott Burch, trainer (USA); Mack Miller, trainer (USA); Ian Balding, trainer (UK)

Rokeby Stables was an American thoroughbred racehorse breeding farm in Upperville, Virginia, involved with both steeplechase and flat racing. The operation was established in the late 1940s by Paul Mellon (1907–1999), who won the Eclipse Award for Outstanding Breeder in 1971 and again in 1986. Under Mellon the stable had more than 1,000 stakes race winners with total earnings in excess of US$30 million.

== Steeplechase racing ==
Rokeby Stables' American Way was the 1948 American Steeplechase Champion and in 1990 Molotov won the American Grand National Steeplechase.

== Flat racing ==
Among its many successful horses, the stable owned the good runner Winter's Tale, Kentucky Derby winner Sea Hero, and the European champions Mill Reef, Glint of Gold, and Gold and Ivory. Mill Reef's wins included The Derby and the Prix de l'Arc de Triomphe. Glint of Gold, a son of Mill Reef, won six European Group One races including the 1981 Derby Italiano, Grand Prix de Paris, and Preis von Europa. Paul Mellon is one of only four men to have raced both a Kentucky Derby winner and an Epsom Derby winner. The others are John W. Galbreath, Michael Tabor, and Prince Ahmed bin Salman. Mellon, however, is the only one ever to win the Kentucky Derby, the Epsom Derby, and the Prix de l'Arc de Triomphe.

In England, Mellon kept his horses at trainer Ian Balding's Park House Stables at Kingsclere and raced under his own name. In the United States, Rokeby Stables employed a number of prominent trainers including Hall of Fame inductee Elliott Burch, who trained the stable's champions Arts and Letters, Quadrangle, Fort Marcy, Run the Gantlet, and Key to the Mint. Another Hall of Fame inductee, Mack Miller, took over as the Rokeby trainer in 1977. Miller's accomplishments include winning the New York Handicap Triple in 1984 with Fit To Fight and the 1993 Kentucky Derby with Sea Hero. Once Miller retired from training, in 1995, the then 88-year-old Paul Mellon decided to give up racing but still maintained his breeding operations.
