= Suburban Handicap top three finishers =

Listing of the horses that finished in first three positions

This is a listing of the horses that finished in either first, second, or third place and the number of starters in the Suburban Handicap, an American Grade 2 race for three-year-olds at 1-1/8 miles on synthetic surface held at Belmont Park in Elmont, New York. (List 1973–present)

Year	Winner	Second	Third	Starters
2026				11
2025	Phileas Fogg	Antiquarian	Locked	7
2024	Crupi	Bendoog	Masqueparade	7
2023	Charge It	Clapton	Unbridled Bomber	5
2022	Dynamic One	First Captain	Untreated	5
2021	Max Player	Mystic Guide	Happy Saver	6
2020	Tacitus	Moretti	Parsimony	6
2019	Presevasionist	Catholic Boy	Pavel	11
2018	Diversify	The Lieutenant	Discreet Lover	10
2017	Keen Ice	Shaman Ghost	Follow Me Crev	5
2016	Effinex	Samraat	Mubtaahij	7
2015	Effinex	Tonalist	Coach Inge	5
2014	Zivo	Moreno	Prayer for Relief	11
2013	Flat Out	Last Gunfighter	Fast Falcon	5
2012	Mucho Macho Man	Hymn Book	Trickmeister	7
2011	Flat Out	Hymn Book	Rodman	6
2010	Haynesfield	Convocation	I Want Revenge	7
2009	Dry Martini	Asiatic Boy	Rising Moon	10
2008	Frost Giant	Solar Flare	Rising Moon	8
2007	Political Force	Fairbanks	Malibu Moonshine	6
2006	Invasor	Wild Desert	Andromeda's Hero	7
2005	Offlee Wild	Tap Day	Pollard's Vision	8
2004	Peace Rules	Newfoundland	Funny Cide	8
2003	Mineshaft	Volponi	Dollar Bill	8
2002	E Dubai	Lido Palace	Macho Uno	7
2001	Albert the Great	Lido Palace	Include	6
2000	Lemon Drop Kid	Behrens	Lager	6
1999	Behrens	Catienus	Social Charter	8
1998	Frisk Me Now	Ordway	Sir Bear	8
1997	Skip Away	Will's Way	Formal Gold	6
1996	Wekiva Springs	Mahogany Hall	L'Carriere	7
1995	Key Contender	Kissin Kris	Federal Funds	10
1994	Devil His Due	Valley Crossing	Federal Funds	5
1993	Devil His Due	Pure Rumor	West by West	8
1992	Pleasant Tap	Strike the Gold	Defensive Play	7
1991	In Excess	Chief Honcho	Killer Diller	7
1990	Easy Goer	De Roche	Montubio	7
1989	Dancing Spree	Forever Silver	Easy N Dirty	12
1988	Personal Flag	Waquoit	Bet Twice	4
1987	Broad Brush	Set Style	Bordeaux Bob	5
1986	Roo Art	Proud Truth	Creme Fraiche	6
1985	Vanlandingham	Carr de Naskra	Dramatic Desire	9
1984	Fit to Fight	Canadian Factor	Wild Again	7
1983	Winter's Tale	Sing Sing	Highland Blade	8
1982	Silver Buck	Aloma's Ruler	It's the One	8
1981	Temperance Hill	Ring of Light	Highland Blade	8
1980	Winter's Tale	State Dinner	Czaravich	7
1979	State Dinner	Mister Brea	Alydar	5
1978	Upper Nile	Nearly On Time	Great Contractor	6
1977	Quiet Little Table	Forego	Nearly On Time	6
1976	Foolish Pleasure	Forego	Lord Rebeau	4
1975	Forego	Arbees Boy	Loud	7
1974	True Knight	Plunk	Forego	10
1973	Key To The Mint	True Knight	Cloudy Dawn	6
