= High Gun =

American Thoroughbred racehorse

- Sire: Heliopolis
- Grandsire: Hyperion
- Dam: Rocket Gun
- Damsire: Brazado
- Sex: Stallion
- Foaled: 1951
- Country: United States
- Colour: Brown
- Breeder: Kellar M. & W. Paul Little & Cary C. Boshamer
- Owner: King Ranch
- Trainer: Max Hirsch
- Record: 24: 11-5-4
- Earnings: US$486,025

Major wins
- Peter Pan Handicap (1954); Dwyer Stakes (1954); Manhattan Handicap (1954); Jockey Club Gold Cup (1954); Sysonby Handicap (1954, 1955); Metropolitan Handicap (1955); Brooklyn Handicap (1955) U.S. Triple Crown wins: Belmont Stakes (1954)

Awards
- American Champion 3-Year-Old Male Horse (1954); American Champion Older Male Horse (1955)

High Gun (foaled 1951 in Kentucky) was an American Champion Thoroughbred racehorse.

== Background ==
High Gun's sire, Heliopolis, was a two-time leading sire in North America. His dam was Rocket Gun whose damsire was Man o' War. Trainer Max Hirsch purchased High Gun for Robert J. Kleberg's King Ranch at the 1952 Keeneland Yearling Sale for $10,200 ($123,665 in 2025).

== Racing career ==
In 1954, High Gun was the best three-year-old colt in the United States, winning the Peter Pan Handicap, Dwyer Stakes, the third leg of the U.S. Triple Crown series, the Belmont Stakes, and then beat older horses in the Manhattan Handicap, Sysonby Handicap, and Jockey Club Gold Cup. In November of that year, an injury kept High Gun out of the prestigious Washington, D.C. International Stakes won by Fisherman, a colt High Gun had beaten in June's Belmont Stakes and October's Jockey Club Gold Cup. High Gun was voted the 1954 American Champion Three-Year-Old Male Horse.

Racing at age four in 1955, High Gun continued his winning ways, capturing two of the New York Handicap Triple races, the Metropolitan and Brooklyn, and was second in the third, the Suburban. That year he followed Tom Fool as the only horses to ever win the Sysonby Handicap twice, doing it by defeating the great Nashua. High Gun was voted his second Champion's title as the 1955 American Champion Older Male Horse.

High Gun was regularly ridden by Anthony DeSpirito, the 1952 United States Champion Jockey.

== Stud record ==
After three years of racing, High Gun was retired to stud duty but was not successful.
