= Roman Brother =

American-bred Thoroughbred racehorse

- Sire: Third Brother
- Grandsire: Princequillo
- Dam: Roman Zephyr
- Damsire: Roman
- Sex: Gelding
- Foaled: May 27, 1961
- Country: United States
- Colour: Bay
- Breeder: Ocala Stud Farm
- Owner: Harbor View Farm
- Trainer: Burley Parke
- Record: 42: 16-10-5
- Earnings: $943,473

Major wins
- Champagne Stakes (1963); Bahamas Stakes (1964); Everglades Stakes (1964); Jersey Derby (1964); American Derby (1964); Discovery Handicap (1964); Jockey Club Gold Cup (1965); Woodward Stakes (1965); Manhattan Handicap (1965)

Awards
- American Champion Older Male Horse (1965); DRF American Horse of the Year (1965)

Roman Brother (May 27, 1961 – March 8, 1991) was an American Champion Thoroughbred racehorse. As a two-year-old, he was initially overshadowed by his stable companion Raise a Native before emerging as one of the year's leading juveniles with a win in the Champagne Stakes. As a three-year-old, he was highly tried, running twenty times and winning six races including the Jersey Derby and the American Derby. He was also placed second in the Belmont Stakes and the Jockey Club Gold Cup. He reached his peak as a four-year-old in 1965 when he was voted American Horse of the Year in a poll conducted by the Daily Racing Form.

== Background ==
Roman Brother was a bay gelding bred by the Ocala Stud Farm in Marion County Florida. He was sired by Third Brother, who won the Long Island Handicap for his owner-breeder Christopher Chenery in 1956. Third Brother showed some promise as a stallion before his death in 1963: in addition to Roman Brother, he sired Exceedingly, who defeated Damascus in the William Dupont Jr. Handicap. Roman Brother's dam, Roman Zephyr, won four races and was a descendant of the influential broodmare Plucky Liege. In January 1963, Roman Brother was sent to the Florida Breeders' sale, where he sold for $23,500 (the second highest price at the sale) to Farnsworth Farm.

He entered into the ownership of Louis Wolfson's Harbor View Farm and was trained by future National Museum of Racing and Hall of Fame inductee Burley Parke. Roman Brother was an unusually small Thoroughbred, standing 15.1 hands high and weighing in at 889 pounds just before the Belmont Stakes. Contemporary newspapers nicknamed him the "Mighty Mite". Roman Brother was described by one of his handlers as "all heart" but also "a mean little devil".

== Racing career ==
=== 1963: two-year-old season ===
In the summer of 1963, the leading two-year-old in Parke's stable was Raise a Native, who was undefeated in four races and was regarded as the best horse of his generation before his career was ended by injury in early August. At the time of Raise a Native's injury, his stable companion, Roman Brother, who had been gelded before the start of his racing career, had appeared only once on the racecourse, winning a maiden race at Aqueduct Racetrack on July 25. The gelding made steady progress before emerging as a top-class horse in autumn. Racing at Aqueduct, Roman Brother won two allowance races before challenging for the Champagne Stakes on October 13. Wolfson paid a supplementary fee of $10,000 to run Roman Brother, as he had not been among the original entries for the race, which carried prize money of $212,150, making it the most valuable race ever run in New York. Ridden by John L. Rotz, Roman Brother tracked the leaders before taking the lead early in the straight and drawing away from his ten opponents to win by four and a half lengths. His win was marked at Ocala Stud Farm by the ringing of the old ship's bell which was used to mark major successes by the stud's produce.

Despite losing his undefeated record when second to Hurry to Market at Garden State Park, Roman Brother started favorite for the Garden State Futurity at the same track on November 9. In a race which carried world record prize money of $317,390, he finished second, beaten a length by Hurry to Market. An objection by Rotz against the winner for causing interference was unsuccessful.

Although Raise a Native and Hurry to Market topped the polls for the title of American Champion Two-Year-Old Colt, Roman Brother was reported to be the biggest money winner of his generation in 1963.

=== 1964: three-year-old season ===
Roman Brother began his season in his native Florida. After finishing third on his debut, he won the seven-furlong Bahamas Stakes over seven furlongs at Hialeah Park, surviving a rough race to win in a time of 1:23.2. By this time, he was regarded as a leading contender for the U.S. Triple Crown series. Later in February, Roman Brother moved up to nine furlongs for the Everglades Stakes, in which he started favorite. Ridden by Manuel Ycaza, the gelding came from well off the pace to catch Mr. Brick in the closing strides and win by a head. After the race, Ycaza described the winner as "an awful willing little horse". In the Flamingo Stakes on March 3, Roman Brother was matched against Northern Dancer, another unusually small thoroughbred, in what was described in the press as a meeting of the "Mighty Mites". Northern Dancer won, with Roman Brother fifth in a dead-heat with Dandy K, beaten more than fifteen lengths by the winner. Three weeks later, Roman Brother failed to concede ten pounds to Dandy K when finishing second in the Fountain of Youth Stakes. On the final start of his Florida campaign, Roman Brother again finished fifth behind Northern Dancer, this time in the Florida Derby.

In April, Roman Brother moved north and finished third to Mr Brick and Quadrangle in the Wood Memorial Stakes at Aqueduct Racetrack. He was then sent to Churchill Downs where he prepared for the Derby by running second to the Californian colt Hill Rise in the Derby Trial Stakes. Four days later, Roman Brother was drawn on the outside of the twelve-runner field for the Kentucky Derby, for which Hill Rise was made favorite ahead of Northern Dancer. Roman Brother was beaten four lengths in fourth place behind Northern Dancer, Hill Rise and The Scoundrel. After finishing fifth in the Preakness Stakes, he broke a run of seven defeats by winning the $125,300 Jersey Derby at Garden State Park. Parke only ran the gelding because The Scoundrel had been injured, but Roman Brother took the lead on the turn into the stretch and drew clear to beat Mr. Brick by three lengths. A week later, he ran second to Quadrangle in the Belmont Stakes, finishing ahead of Northern Dancer and Hill Rise.

At the end of June, Roman Brother was sent to Arlington Park, where he ran second to Dandy K when odds-on favorite for the $100,000 Chicagoan Handicap. Two weeks later, he finished third to Quadrangle in the Dwyer Stakes at Aqueduct. In August, Roman Brother ran fourth behind the filly Tosmah in the Arlington Classic and then contested the American Derby at the same track three weeks later. Starting the 2/1 favorite, he produced a strong finish to win the $134,300 prize by a length from Lt. Stevens. Roman Brother's next target was the inaugural running of the $144,820 New Hampshire Sweepstake at Rockingham Park. Ridden by Fernando Alvarez, he came from last place in the backstretch to win by half a length from Knightly Manner in a track record time of 1:55.8. It was the gelding's fifth win in seventeen runs since the start of the year and took his career earnings to $627,008. Two weeks later, he defeated Lt. Stevens by a nose in the Discovery Handicap at Aqueduct.

In October, Roman Brother was moved up in distance for another meeting with Quadrangle in the Lawrence Realization Stakes over one and five-eighth miles at Aqueduct. He failed by a nose to catch Quadrangle but was blocked on three occasions and was given a "poorly judged" ride by Alvarez. Roman Brother and Quadrangle met again in the two-mile Jockey Club Gold Cup on October 31, but most interest was attracted by Kelso, who was attempting to win the race for a fifth time and to become the biggest money winner in racing history. Kelso won easily, and Roman Brother beat Quadrangle by six lengths for second place.

=== 1965: four-year-old season ===
For the start of his 1965 campaign, Roman Brother was sent to compete in California. He finished last of the ten runners in the Malibu Stakes at Santa Anita Park on January 2 and ninth behind Hill Rise in the San Fernando Stakes two weeks later. A move to Florida in February brought little improvement as he finished seventh to Sunstruck in the Seminole Handicap.

After a five-month break, Roman Brother, ridden by his new regular jockey Braulio Baeza, returned in July to win an allowance race at Aqueduct and then ran second to Pia Star in the Brooklyn Handicap, with Kelso in third. He won a minor race at Saratoga before finishing ahead of Kelso again in the Aqueduct Stakes in September, when the geldings finished third and fourth behind Malicious. Roman Brother then finished second to the mare Old Hat in the Michigan Mile And One-Eighth Handicap.

With Kelso ruled out for the season with an eye injury Roman Brother dominated the rest of America's older horses in October, winning all three of his races. On October 2, he won the Woodward Stakes from Royal Gunner, with Malicious taking third. Ten days later, Roman Brother won the Manhattan Handicap by eight lengths from Hill Rise. According to the New York Times, the manner of his victory "left little doubt of his superiority" over the rest of the handicap division. On October 30 at Aqueduct, Roman Brother appeared for a second attempt at the Jockey Club Gold Cup. Taking the lead on the final turn, he drew away from his rivals to win by five lengths from Berenjenal. According to the Associated Press reporter, Baeza "never had an easier ride".

On his final race of the season, Roman Brother moved onto turf and was made favorite for the Washington, D.C. International Stakes at Laurel Park Racecourse. He was among the leaders from the start and finished third behind the French-trained runners Diatome and Carvin.

Roman Brother was named 1965 Horse of The Year after topping a poll organised by the publishers of Daily Racing Form, becoming the first horse sold at public auction to be so honored. The two-year-old filly Moccasin won the two rival polls organized by the Thoroughbred Racing Association and Turf and Sports Digest, beating Roman Brother by 44 votes to 39 in the latter poll. Roman Brother was named Champion Handicap horse in all three polls.

=== 1966: five-year-old season ===
Roman Brother opened his five-year-old season by winning a seven-furlong race at Hialeah on January 25. The prize took his career earnings to $940,403, leading to speculation that he was poised to become the next equine millionaire. On February 5, Roman Brother, carrying 126 pounds, started 1/2 favorite for the Seminole Handicap at the same track. The gelding was never in contention, finishing fourth to Convex. Roman Brother sustained an injury to his left ankle in the race, which forced him to miss an intended run in the Widener Handicap. The injury did not respond to treatment, and Roman Brother was retired from racing.

== Retirement and death ==
Roman Brother spent his retirement at Harbor View Farm before being moved to Stephen and Gary Wolfson's Happy Valley Farm after the sale of Harbor View. On the afternoon of March 8, 1991, he died after a severe bout with colic, at age 29. His rival Northern Dancer, who like Roman Brother was foaled on May 27, 1961, had been euthanized exactly 16 weeks earlier on November 16, 1990, due to complications also from colic. The two had been one of the only known close rivals ever to have the same foaling date and to die within four months of each other due to the same illness.

The Roman Brother Handicap, a race restricted to Florida-breds and run at Hialeah, was named in the gelding's honor.

== Pedigree ==
Pedigree of Roman Brother (USA) bay gelding 1961
Sire Third Brother (USA) 1953	Princequillo (USA); 1940	Prince Rose	Rose Prince
Sire Third Brother (USA) 1953	Princequillo (USA); 1940	Prince Rose	Indolence
Sire Third Brother (USA) 1953	Princequillo (USA); 1940	Cosquilla	Papyrus
Sire Third Brother (USA) 1953	Princequillo (USA); 1940	Cosquilla	Quick Thought
Sire Third Brother (USA) 1953	Hildene (USA); 1938	Bubbling Over	North Star
Sire Third Brother (USA) 1953	Hildene (USA); 1938	Bubbling Over	Beaming Beauty
Sire Third Brother (USA) 1953	Hildene (USA); 1938	Fancy Racket	Wrack
Sire Third Brother (USA) 1953	Hildene (USA); 1938	Fancy Racket	Ultimate Fancy
Dam Roman Zephyr (USA) 1947	Roman (USA); 1937	Sir Gallahad	Teddy
Dam Roman Zephyr (USA) 1947	Roman (USA); 1937	Sir Gallahad	Plucky Liege
Dam Roman Zephyr (USA) 1947	Roman (USA); 1937	Buckup	Buchan
Dam Roman Zephyr (USA) 1947	Roman (USA); 1937	Buckup	Look Up
Dam Roman Zephyr (USA) 1947	Blois (USA); 1940	Man o' War	Fair Play
Dam Roman Zephyr (USA) 1947	Blois (USA); 1940	Man o' War	Mahubah
Dam Roman Zephyr (USA) 1947	Blois (USA); 1940	Mademoiselle de Valo	Sardanapale
Dam Roman Zephyr (USA) 1947	Blois (USA); 1940	Mademoiselle de Valo	Marguerite de Valois (Family: 16-a)
