= Jerry Bailey =

American jockey (born 1957)

Personal information
- Born: August 29, 1957 (age 68) Dallas, Texas, United States
- Occupations: Broadcaster, former jockey

Horse racing career
- Sport: Horse racing
- Career wins: 5,894

Major racing wins
- New York Handicap Triple (1984); Jaipur Stakes (1984, 1991, 1993, 1998, 2001, 2002); Bonnie Miss Stakes (1993, 1996, 2000, 2001, 2005); Dubai World Cup (1996, 1997, 2001, 2002); Prince of Wales's Stakes (2000); Hollywood Gold Cup (1992, 1995, 1998, 1999, 2003); Pacific Classic Stakes (2004); Del Mar Futurity (2000); Palomar Breeders' Cup Handicap (2005); Madison Stakes (2005); Arkansas Derby (1988); Pimlico Special (1995, 1997, 2001); Jockey Club Gold Cup (1995, 1997, 2001); Arlington Million (2000, 2002); Kentucky Oaks (1993, 2001, 2005); Florida Derby (1992, 2003, 2005) American Classics wins: Kentucky Derby (1993, 1996); Preakness Stakes (1991, 2000); Belmont Stakes (1991, 2003) Breeders' Cup wins: Breeders' Cup Juvenile Fillies (1995, 1999); Breeders' Cup Juvenile (1996, 1998, 2000); Breeders' Cup Filly & Mare Turf (1999, 2000); Breeders' Cup Sprint (2001, 2002); Breeders' Cup Mile (2003); Breeders' Cup Classic (1991, 1993, 1994, 1995, 2005)

Racing awards
- George Woolf Memorial Jockey Award (1992); Mike Venezia Memorial Award (1993); United States Champion Jockey by earnings (1995, 1996, 1997, 2001, 2002, 2003); Big Sport of Turfdom Award (1996); Eclipse Award for Outstanding Jockey (1995, 1996, 1997, 2000, 2001, 2002, 2003)

Honours
- United States Racing Hall of Fame (1995)

Significant horses
- Black Tie Affair, Sea Hero, Fit to Fight; Cigar, Arcangues, My Flag, Skip Away; Royal Anthem, Hansel, Real Quiet; Six Perfections, Dubai Millennium, Grindstone, Concern; Congaree, Victory Gallop, Medaglia d'Oro; Candy Eclair, Empire Maker, Saint Liam
- Updated on July 8, 2007

Jerry D. Bailey (born August 29, 1957) is a retired American Hall of Fame jockey and current NBC Sports thoroughbred racing analyst. He is widely regarded as one of the greatest jockeys of all time.

== Early years ==
Bailey was born in Dallas, Texas but raised in El Paso. He had a pony as a child and became interested in thoroughbred racing at age 11 when his father, James, a dentist, claimed some horses at nearby Sunland Park Racetrack in New Mexico. He began riding Quarter horses at the age of 12 and started riding Thoroughbreds competitively at 17 in 1974.

Bailey took his first racetrack job at Sunland Park as a groom for trainer J.J. Pletcher and an occasional babysitter for Pletcher's son, Todd, then in the second grade, who later would follow in his father's footsteps and eventually become one of America's most successful trainers.

== Career ==
Bailey's first official ride came on November 2, 1974, on Pegged Rate at Sunland. That horse finished unplaced, but Bailey won with both his mounts the next day, scoring his first career victory aboard Fetch. He had no grand ambitions: "I didn't think I'd ever leave New Mexico", he told an ESPN interviewer.

The next year, Bailey was the leading apprentice jockey at Sunland and Ak-Sar-Ben, where he rode his first stakes winner, Pletcher-trained 3-year-old filly Bye Bye Battle, in the $25,000 His Majesty's Council Handicap on May 24, 1975. After briefly attending college that fall at the University of Texas at El Paso, Bailey returned to the saddle to be leading apprentice at Oaklawn Park in 1976.

In the fall of 1976, Bailey moved to the south Florida circuit of Calder Race Course, Gulfstream Park and Hialeah Park, and over the next few years also raced at Hollywood Park, Monmouth Park, Hawthorne Race Course and Arlington Park. In 1982, Bailey began riding regularly at the major New York tracks – Belmont Park, Aqueduct Racetrack, and Saratoga – while returning to Florida in the winters, a popular circuit he would continue riding the remainder of his career, and would later dominate.

== Career accomplishments ==
Regarded as one of the world's all-time greatest jockeys, Bailey's mounts won 5,894 races and more than $296 million during a 31-year riding career, second only to jockey Pat Day at the time of Bailey's retirement.

At the time of his retirement in January 2006, he ranked No. 2 on the career North American money list and still ranks No. 3. He won each Triple Crown race twice (his winning Kentucky Derby rides through traffic on Sea Hero in 1993 and Grindstone in 1996 are considered two of the best in modern Derby history); and scored a record five wins in the Breeders' Cup Classic, the richest race in the U.S., along with other Breeders' Cup categories, totalling 15 victories in all, a record Bailey shares with only Hall of Fame jockey Chris McCarron.

He earned a record four victories in the Dubai World Cup, the world's richest race, and is the only jockey ever to win America's Eclipse Award for Outstanding Jockey seven times, including an unprecedented four straight years (2000–2003).

Bailey had many prominent mounts, but will be best remembered as the regular jockey of Cigar, who tied the modern North American record for sixteen consecutive wins, including an undefeated Horse of the Year campaign in 1995, capped by a win in the Breeders Cup Classic. The next spring, jockey and horse teamed to win the inaugural Dubai World Cup. After Cigar retired to stud, Bailey visited him regularly in Lexington, Kentucky, up until he died in 2014. Bailey said, "He was just a cool horse. He was charismatic and he loved people. We know how good he was on the track, how he dominated horses. I was just always interested in what he was doing at the barn."

Bailey was inducted into the American Racing Hall of Fame in 1995. He was chosen by his peers to receive the George Woolf Memorial Jockey Award in 1992, which honors riders whose careers and personal character earn esteem for the individual and the sport of racing. In 1993, he received the Mike Venezia Memorial Award, honoring jockeys who exemplify extraordinary sportsmanship and citizenship, from the New York Racing Association. Bailey also won the All-Star Jockey Championship in 2001 and 2004 at Lone Star Park.

== 1993 Breeders' Cup Classic ==
Bailey's 1993 win in the Classic, riding French horse Arcangues, ranks as one of the biggest upsets in Thoroughbred racing history. The races were held at the Santa Anita Derby. Arcangues was a tremendous long shot. Bailey had never before ridden Arcangues and was given the ride only nine days before the race. The colt's groom tried to give Bailey instructions in French in the paddock, and Bailey was able to speak only briefly to trainer André Fabre while he was already on Arcangues' back in the walking ring. He had to determine his own race plan. Bailey glanced at the odds board during the post parade and decided he needed to stay close to the rail as long as possible in hopes of cracking the top five positions on the board. Arcangues stormed past favorite Bertrando in the stretch to win comfortably at 133-to-1 odds, paying a Breeders' Cup-record $269.20 for a $2 win ticket. (The odds were so high the tote board at Santa Anita Park could not encapsulate them, reading 99-to-1.)

Bailey described the two-minute race on video later. Among his comments:

When...I broke from the gate, all I did was just ease him back a little bit, try to find a rhythm with him. I had no idea what to expect. My expectations were actually very, very low. ... I had three or four horses beaten, and...I was pleased here, I thought, "This horse is not going to embarrass me." ... Bertrando was on the lead... I've got a lot of horse, and I'm thinking, "Not only can I hit the board, I may actually have a chance to win this thing." ... Arcangues was full of run when I asked him. We went past Bertrando as easy as you can go by a horse. I knew Gary Stevens was probably thinking, as he looked up, "Who in the heck is this horse running by me?" At this point, Arcangues went on and won easily. A shocker.

About Arcangues, "I still don't know how to pronounce his name," Bailey joked afterwards. The Total Horse Channel calls it iconic, one of "four of the best moments that fans still remember," on a par with the Belmont Stakes win of Secretariat in 1973. In 2023, the website America's Best Racing rated it at #1 of "14 Amazing Upsets in the Breeders' Cup." Essentially Sports writes that "his 1993 Breeders Cup win was one-of-a-kind and will forever go down in the annals of history for being his most legendary [win]." The announcer for the race, Tom Durkin called it an "absolutely shocking, impossible victory."

== 2003 season ==
From a statistical perspective, Bailey's best season in the saddle was 2003, due in large part to his growing association with late trainer Robert Frankel, whose stable during that time was one of the most formidable in the modern history of the sport. That year, Bailey won a career-high $23,354,960 million in purses, a North American record that stood until broken in 2012 by Ramon Domínguez. Included in his 2003 victories were 26 wins in Grade 1 stakes races, a record that still stands. Fourteen of those Grade 1 victories were on horses trained by Frankel, including Empire Maker, Medaglia d'Oro, Sightseek and Aldebaran.

== Bailey at Saratoga ==
Through his own words and actions, Bailey was most fond of riding in the summers at Saratoga Race Course – America's most prestigious race meeting. "I am worn out at the end of (Saratoga)", Bailey once said. "I try to pace myself all year to get ready for that one meet." His seven Saratoga riding championships – second only to Ángel Cordero Jr.'s 14 titles – came in an eight-year span between 1994 and 2001, a streak interrupted in 1998 when John Velazquez topped the standings. On August 6, 2004, Bailey rode Taittinger Rose to his 641st Saratoga victory, surpassing Cordero's career record – although Cordero's totals were remarkable considering Saratoga raced only 24 days a year until 1991. Bailey's career total of 693 Saratoga wins lasted until broken in 2013 by Velazquez – whose agent is Cordero.

Bailey scored 109 victories in Saratoga stakes races, including 35 Grade 1 wins: the Test Stakes (six times), Hopeful Stakes (six), Whitney Handicap (five), Alabama Stakes (four), Travers Stakes (three), Forego Handicap (three), Go For Wand Handicap (three), Sword Dancer Invitational Handicap (once), Personal Ensign Stakes (once), Jim Dandy Stakes (once), King's Bishop Stakes (once) and the Ballerina Stakes (once). He also won the Grade 2 Bernard Baruch Handicap seven times, and the Grade 2 Lake Placid Stakes six times.

== Hall of Fame connections ==
Bailey's successful professional relationships were with Hall of Fame trainers MacKenzie Miller, Bill Mott and Frankel, and with Sheikh Mohammed bin Rashid al Maktoum, the ruler of Dubai who with his brothers and family operates a global racing and breeding powerhouse.

Bailey made a stop at Miller's barn every morning for coffee and conversation, and riding for Miller and owner Paul Mellon helped take his career to new heights. He rode Fit to Fight, who in 1984 swept what was then known as the New York Handicap Triple with wins in the Metropolitan Handicap, Suburban Handicap and Brooklyn Handicap. He also would carry Mellon's silks to Grade 1 victories aboard Hero's Honor, Danger's Hour, Eastern Echo, You'd be Surprised – and Sea Hero, who gave Bailey, Miller and Mellon their first Kentucky Derby wins.

Mott began to take closer notice of Bailey in the early 1990s, using him for nine stakes wins in a three-year period. But the combination would begin to soar in the fall of 1994, when Mott picked Bailey to ride his improving 4-year-old Cigar in the NYRA Mile after Mike Smith instead chose to ride multiple stakes winner Devil His Due. At 8-to-1 odds, Cigar romped to a seven-length win over Devil His Due, the 2-to-1 favorite, for the second of his 16 consecutive victories. "I'd been riding Smith", Mott said, "and I was starting to take a back seat to the Phipps outfit. We were running into each other and Jerry wanted to ride a few. I was watching him and I said, 'Man, he laid some good rides on these horses.' That kind of started it out." Bailey would go on to win 96 graded stakes races for Mott, notching Grade 1s (other than Cigar's 11) aboard Fraise, Wekiva Springs, Geri, Escena, Confessional, Yagli, Royal Anthem, Snow Polina, Stroll, Sweet Symphony and Shakespeare.

Bailey began riding regularly for Frankel in 2000, after parting ways with his longtime agent Bob Frieze and hiring Ron Anderson, whose connections and handicapping talents would help fuel Bailey's best seasons. Anderson had developed a friendship with Frankel from his time in Southern California as agent for Gary Stevens. That friendship would pay off handsomely in July, when Bailey watched a Del Mar race in which Frankel-trained turf star Chester House lost a stakes he should have won. Bailey had won only one previous stakes race for Frankel nearly four years earlier, but asked Anderson to contact the trainer and try to get the mount.

Three weeks later, Bailey gave what he called one of the best rides of his life on Chester House in an Arlington Million win that would be the horse's final race. Frankel's stable rapidly developed into one of the strongest in the sport's history, and Bailey became a key element in its success. Together they had a gaudy win rate of 38% in graded stakes races, teaming to take 32 Grade 1s in a five-year span with Flute, Lido Palace, Squirtle Squirt, Aptitude, You, Beat Hollow, Medaglia d'Oro, Empire Maker, Sightseek, Aldebaran, Denon, Spoken Fur, Wild Spirit, Peace Rules, Intercontinental and I'm the Tiger. Bailey won eight stakes races on Sightseek and seven on Intercontinental. Among their many successes were the Belmont Stakes (Empire Maker), Kentucky Oaks (Flute) and Breeders' Cup Sprint (Squirtle Squirt). "Jerry puts a lot of time and effort into what he does", said Frankel, who died in 2009 after a battle with leukemia. "He's very well-prepared going into every race. By the time he gets to the paddock, he knows everything there is to know about the horse he's riding, and he knows everything about the horses he's riding against."

After winning the inaugural Dubai World Cup on American-owned Cigar to help put the event on the international racing map, Bailey returned the next year to ride for Dubai's home team. He won the second running of the then-$4 million race for Sheikh Mohammed aboard Singspiel, who was running on dirt for the first time. The 1997 edition had to be delayed four days due to torrential rains in the desert. Their lucrative partnership continued the next year when Bailey rode Daylami to a win in the 1998 Man O' War Stakes. Bailey rode Godolphin's Worldly Manner to a seventh-place finish in the 1999 Kentucky Derby, giving up the mount on winner Charismatic, whom he had ridden two weeks earlier to win the Lexington Stakes at Keeneland.

In 2000, Sheikh Mohammed flew Bailey to England to ride Godolphin Racing superstar Dubai Millennium in the Prince of Wales's Stakes at Royal Ascot after regular stable rider Frankie Dettori was injured in a plane crash three weeks earlier in Newmarket. Bailey consulted with Dettori about the horse, then rode him to an impressive victory. In the winners' circle, Bailey imitated Dettori's trademark flying dismount and the two jockeys hugged. That fall, Bailey also rode Fantastic Light to a win in the Man O'War.

Bailey teamed with the Maktoums to win the $6 million World Cup in 2002 on Godolphin's Street Cry, when Dettori decided to ride the stable's Sakhee instead. Almost three months later, Street Cry and Bailey won the Grade 1 Stephen Foster Handicap at Churchill Downs. With Bailey's retirement looming in three weeks, he took a January 7, 1996, mount at Gulfstream Park on Bernardini, owned by Sheikh Mohammed's Darley Stable. Trainer Tom Albertrani told Bailey that Bernardini "will make you postpone your retirement", but Bernardini finished fourth that day in his career debut and Bailey retired as planned. Bernardini then reeled off six straight wins, including the Preakness Stakes, Travers Stakes and Jockey Club Gold Cup, ending his championship 3-year-old season and his career with a second-place finish in the Breeders' Cup Classic to Invasor, owned by Sheikh Mohammed's brother, Sheikh Hamdan bin Rashid Al Maktoum.

== 2004 controversies ==
Bailey was vilified by many racing fans for his ride on Eddington in the 2004 Belmont Stakes, which Birdstone won with a late surge to deny wildly popular Smarty Jones a Triple Crown sweep. Smarty Jones was pressured early on the backstretch of the mile-and-a-half race by Bailey from the outside and from the inside by Alex Solis aboard Rock Hard Ten. That pressure caused Smarty Jones to impatiently rush to the front with jockey Stewart Elliott, and he blew a 3½-length lead entering the stretch to lose by a length. Eddington and Rock Hard Ten faded badly to finish a nose apart in fourth and fifth, respectively, beaten 12 lengths. John Servis, trainer of Smarty Jones, accused Bailey of "sacrificing" Eddington. Bailey said, "I'm sorry he feels that way, but that's not the case." Bailey defended his aggressive tactics by saying that to have any chance of winning, he and Solis had to turn up the heat on Smarty Jones, the 1-to-9 favorite who in Bailey's estimation was having an easy trip in slow fractions up to that point.

Three weeks before that Belmont, Bailey and Solis were also involved in a controversy involving advertising patches on jockey pants. They joined four other riders as plaintiffs in a suit against the Kentucky Horse Racing Authority, whose prohibition on such patches they alleged to be a violation of their First Amendment rights. Two days before the Kentucky Derby, U.S. District Judge John G. Heyburn II sided with the jockeys. Bailey, who wore a Wrangler patch on his right leg during his 2003 Belmont Stakes win aboard Empire Maker, was scheduled to wear the same patch in the 2004 Derby but his mount Wimbledon was scratched the day before the race with an injury.

== Retirement ==
Bailey announced his retirement January 19, 2006. His farewell mount was January 28 in a $500,000 stakes at Gulfstream Park aboard Silver Tree – fittingly for Mott, former trainer of Cigar. In the paddock before the race, Silver Tree kicked Bailey in the hip – "I guess I went out with a bang", Bailey said – and they went on to finish second as the odds-on favorites. In the summer of 2006, Bailey began his second career as a thoroughbred racing analyst for ESPN. When ESPN discontinued its horse racing coverage in 2012, Bailey moved to NBC. Bailey's final mount as a jockey would actually come on October 18, 2008, at Santa Anita in the "Living Legends Race", in which he joined seven fellow retired Hall of Fame riders to celebrate the 25th anniversary of the Breeders' Cup. Mounts were selected by random draw for the seven-furlong allowance sprint, which was open to pari-mutuel betting and thus considered an official race and not an exhibition. Bailey rode Dee Dee's Legacy to a second-place finish behind Tribal Chief, ridden by Sandy Hawley.

== Accolades ==
Trainer Bill Mott said of Bailey, "He trains hard. He thinks about it, he works at it, he doesn't smoke, drink or stay up late. He's a dedicated athlete. I think he realizes there's a certain amount of time he can do this, and he's going to make all the best of it. He wants to be as good as he can be for as long as he can do it. He wants to be the best. For my money, day-in and day-out, he's as good as there is." Trainer Bobby Frankel said, "He's very well-prepared going into every race. By the time he gets to the paddock, he knows everything there is to know about the horse he's riding, and he knows everything about the horses he's riding against." Trainer Fred Danley has said that Bailey worked horses perfectly and knew how to handle them because he could analyze the horse's speed and capabilities. He often knew how a race would shape up and what the other riders would do.

== Personal life ==
Bailey met New York-based SportsChannel reporter Suzee Chulick when she interviewed him in the Hialeah Park winners' circle after his victory in the 1984 Flamingo Stakes with Time For a Change. The two were married in Great Neck, New York on December 17, 1985. Their son, Justin Daniel, was born in 1992. In Bailey's autobiography, Against the Odds: Riding for My Life, which he co-wrote with USA Today's Tom Pedulla, he chronicled in great detail his battle with alcoholism that nearly cost him his marriage and his career. Bailey says he took his last drink on January 15, 1989, and continues to regularly attend Alcoholics Anonymous meetings.

Most jockeys become racers because they love horses; Bailey has said that he never really loved horses until he met the champion Cigar. He became a jockey because he enjoyed the thrill of competition more than anything else, and horses were a means to that end.

Bailey earned a reputation for being aloof at times. He was often so focused on recalling the tactics and analyses he had studied to prepare for a race that he didn't socialize beforehand, and chose not to go out partying with other jockeys after races.

He told an interviewer who asked if he bets on races, "I don't go to the track when I'm off. And I wouldn't consider betting. Jockeys are the worst handicappers in the world."

Bailey donated $19,000 to the Jockeys' Guild Disabled Fund when he won the Preakness in 1992, and again the next year after winning the Derby. As President of the Jockey's Guild from 1989 to 1996, Bailey became an official advocate for improved health and safety standards in racing. He also championed the use of flak jackets, protective vests worn by jockeys to protect against injuries to the torso and especially the spine.

Preceded by Bill Shoemaker	Jockeys' Guild President; 1989–1996	Succeeded by Gary Stevens
