= Metropolitan Handicap top three finishers =

This is a listing of the horses that finished in either first, second, or third place and the number of starters in the Metropolitan Handicap, an American Grade 1 race for horses three years old and older at one mile on dirt held at Belmont Park in Elmont, New York. (List 1973–present)

Year	Winner	Second	Third	Starters
2026	Nysos	Knightsbridge	Journalism	7
2025	Raging Torrent	Fierceness	Just a Touch	5
2024	National Treasure	Post Time	Hoist the Gold	6
2023	Cody's Wish	Zandon	White Abarrio	9
2022	Flightline	Happy Saver	Speaker's Corner	5
2021	Sliver State	By My Standards	Mischevious Alex	6
2020	Vekoma	Network Effect	Code of Honor	8
2019	Mitole	McKinzie	Thunder Snow	9
2018	Bee Jersey	Mind Your Biscuits	Limousine Liberal	11
2017	Mor Spirit	Sharp Azteca	Tommy Macho	12
2016	Frosted	Calculator	Upstart	10
2015	Honor Code	Tonalist	Private Zone	10
2014	Palace Malice	Goldencents	Romansh	12
2013	Sahara Sky	Cross Traffic	Flat Out	9
2012	Shackleford	Caleb's Posse	To Honor and Serve	6
2011	Tizway	Rodman	Caixa Eletronica	11
2010	Quality Road	Musket Man	Tizway	8
2009	Bribon	Smooth Air	Driven by Success	12
2008	Divine Park	Commentator	Lord Snowden	9
2007	Corinthian	Political Force	Lawyer Ron	9
2006	Silver Train	Sun King	Mass Media	7
2005	Ghostzapper	Silver Wagon	Sir Shackleton	6
2004	Pico Central	Bowman's Band	Strong Hope	9
2003	Aldebaran	Saarland	Peeping Tom	8
2002	Swept Overboard	Aldebaran	Crafty C. T.	10
2001	Exciting Story	Peeping Tom	Alannan	10
2000	Yankee Victor	Honest Lady	Sir Bear	8
1999	Sir Bear	Crafty Friend	Liberty Gold	8
1998	Wild Rush	Banker's Gold	Accelerator	9
1997	Langfuhr	Western Winter	Northern Afleet	10
1996	Honour and Glory	Lite the Fuse	Afternoon Deelites	9
1995	You And I	Lite the Fuse	Our Emblem	9
1994	Holy Bull	Cherokee Run	Devil His Due	10
1993	Ibero	Bertrando	Alydeed	9
1992	Dixie Brass	Pleasant Tap	In Excess	11
1991	In Excess	Rubiano	Gervazy	14
1990	Criminal Type	Housebuster	Easy Goer	9
1989	Proper Reality	Seeking the Gold	Dancing Spree	8
1988	Gulch	Afleet	Stacked Pack	8
1987	Gulch	King's Swan	Broad Brush	9
1986	Garthorn	Love That Mac	Lady's Secret	8
1985	Forzando	Mo Exception	Track Barron	8
1984	Fit to Fight	A Phenomenon	Moro	10
1983	Star Choice	Tough Critic	John's Gold	13
1982	Conquistador Cielo	Silver Buck	Star Gallant	14
1981	Fappiano	Irish Tower	Amber Pass	7
1980	Czaravich	State Dinner	Silent Cal	8
1979	State Dinner	Dr. Patches	Sorry Lookin	9
1978	Cox's Ridge	Buckfinder	Quiet Little Table	9
1977	Forego	Co Host	Full Out	12
1976	Forego	Master Derby	Lord Rebeau	6
1975	Gold and Myrrh	Stop the Music	Forego	7
1974	Arbees Boy	Forego	Timeless Moment	8
1973	Tentam	Key to the Mint	King's Bishop	8
