= Quadrangle (horse) =

American-bred Thoroughbred racehorse

- Sire: Cohoes
- Grandsire: Mahmoud
- Dam: Tap Day
- Damsire: Bull Lea
- Sex: Stallion
- Foaled: 1961
- Country: United States
- Colour: Bay
- Breeder: Paul Mellon
- Owner: Rokeby Stables
- Trainer: J. Elliott Burch
- Record: 26: 10-5-6,
- Earnings: US$559,386

Major wins
- Pimlico Futurity (1963); Wood Memorial Stakes (1964); Dwyer Handicap (1964); Travers Stakes (1964); Lawrence Realization Stakes (1964) Triple Crown race wins: Belmont Stakes (1964)
- Last updated on March 4, 2010

Quadrangle (April 16, 1961 – September 28, 1978) was an American Thoroughbred racehorse who won the 1964 Belmont Stakes.

== Background ==
Bred by Paul Mellon, Quadrangle was foaled at the Rokeby Farm near Upperville, Virginia. He was out of the mare Tap Day, a daughter of the Calumet Farm champion stallion Bull Lea. His sire was the multiple American stakes winner Cohoes, a son of Mahmoud, the Aga Khan's 1936 Epsom Derby winner.

Quadrangle was trained by future Hall of Fame trainer Elliott Burch,

== Racing career ==
Quadrangle is best known for spoiling Northern Dancer's bid to capture the 1964 U.S. Triple Crown when he won the Belmont Stakes, which was run that year at Aqueduct Racetrack.

In 1964, Quadrangle also faced several other top-quality three-year-olds including Hill Rise and Roman Brother, plus older horses such as Kelso and Gun Bow. Earlier in the 1964 racing season, the colt had won the Wood Memorial Stakes before finishing fifth in the Kentucky Derby and fourth in the Preakness Stakes to winner Northern Dancer. After his upset win in the Belmont Stakes under jockey Manuel Ycaza, Quadrangle won that year's Dwyer Handicap, the prestigious Travers Stakes, and the Lawrence Realization Stakes. At the end of his 3 year old campaign he bowed a tendon and was rested. In 1965, at age four, his best result in a Graded stakes race was a second in the Californian Stakes at Hollywood Park Racetrack.

== Stud record ==
Retired to stud, at the Blueridge Farm near Upperville, Quadrangle was a successful sire of a number of stakes winners plus a Hall of Fame filly and Eclipse Award winners, including:

- Susan's Girl (b. 1969), U.S. Racing Hall of Fame inductee
- Square Angel (b. 1970), Canadian Champion Three-Year-Old Filly
- Angle Light (b. 1973), defeated Secretariat in winning the 1973 Wood Memorial Stakes
- Smart Angle (b. 1977), 1979 American Champion Two-Year-Old Filly

While still at stud, Quadrangle broke a leg and was humanely destroyed in 1978 at age seventeen.
