= Whisk Broom II =

American-bred Thoroughbred racehorse

- Whisk Broom II
- Sire: Broomstick
- Grandsire: Ben Brush
- Dam: Audience
- Damsire: Sir Dixon
- Sex: Stallion
- Foaled: 1907
- Country: United States
- Colour: Chestnut
- Breeder: Senorita Stud Farm
- Owner: Harry Payne Whitney
- Trainer: A. Jack Joyner (UK); James G. Rowe Sr. (USA)
- Record: 26:10-7-1
- Earnings: $37,931

Major wins
- Select Stakes (1910); Trial Stakes (1910); Victoria Cup Handicap (1912); Metropolitan Handicap (1913); Brooklyn Handicap (1913); Suburban Handicap (1913)

Awards
- 1st New York Handicap Triple Crown Champion (1913); Retrospective U.S. Champion Older Male Horse (1913); Retrospective United States Horse of the Year (1913)

Honours
- United States Racing Hall of Fame (1979)

Whisk Broom II (1907–1928) was an American-bred Thoroughbred racehorse who raced in the United Kingdom (under the name Whisk Broom) and in the United States. Whisk Broom showed high class form during four seasons of racing in Europe, but produced his best performances when returning to America in 1913. He claimed the New York Handicap Triple by winning the Metropolitan Handicap, the Brooklyn Handicap, and the Suburban Handicap, a feat unmatched until Tom Fool achieved it forty years later. Kelso in 1961 and Fit To Fight in 1984 later joined them as the only other horses to win the Handicap Triple. Whisk Broom II's career was ended by injury after his triple success, but he went on to become a successful breeding stallion.

== Background ==
A grandson of Ben Brush, Whisk Broom II was sired by the U.S. Hall of Fame stallion Broomstick. He was bred in 1907 by the late Sam S. Brown's Senorita Stud Farm (now the site of the Kentucky Horse Park). In 1908 New York State passed the Hart–Agnew Law, which made betting on horse racing illegal, and led to the closure of many racetracks. Several prominent owners moved the bulk of their operations overseas, with Europe being a popular destination. Harry Payne Whitney, who had purchased Whisk Broom, sent the colt to England to be trained by the American Jack Joyner.

== Racing career ==
=== Britain ===
Whisk Broom was one of the best British-trained two-year-old of 1909. On his second start he earned his first win in the Prince of Wales Plate at York Racecourse, but he showed his best form in autumn at Newmarket, when he finished second to the future Epsom Derby winner Lemberg in two of the season's most important tests for juveniles, the Middle Park Stakes and the Dewhurst Stakes. In the former race he finished a neck behind the future English champion after running "very tenaciously". At the end of the year, he was rated the equal third-best two-year-old colt in England behind Neil Gow and Lemberg.

The following spring, Whisk Broom finished second to Neil Gow in the Craven Stakes and then ran third to Neil Gow and Lemberg in the Classic 2000 Guineas. Later that year he won the Trial Stakes at Royal Ascot. In four years of English racing, Whisk Broom won seven of his twenty-three races, his most important subsequent victory coming in the 1912 Victoria Cup Handicap.

=== United States ===
At age six, he was brought back to race in the United States where the "II" suffix was added to his name to distinguish him from an American racehorse (a mare foaled in 1905) already named Whisk Broom. Under trainer James G. Rowe Sr. Whisk Broom II became the first of only four horses to win the three races that compose the New York Handicap Triple Crown Series. In his American campaign he was ridden by Joe Notter.

Racing in New York State had been severely restricted by the Hart–Agnew Law but in 1913 the sport returned, and the first major event was the Metropolitan Handicap at Belmont Park on May 30. The race was Whisk Broom II's first start in the country of his birth and saw him racing on dirt for the first time. The race attracted a crowd of 25,000 and despite the fact that betting on races was still technically banned there were reports of many "oral wagers" being made. Whisk Broom was left at the start but soon recovered to take the lead entering the straight and won by a length from G. M. Miller and Meridian in a time of 1:39.00.

Having carried 120 pounds in the Metropolitan, Whisk Broom II carried 130 pounds to victory in the Brooklyn Handicap and was then assigned 139 pounds for the Suburban Handicap. In the Suburban on June 28 Whisk Broom II was officially clocked at 2:00 minutes flat for the one and one quarter mile race. This was almost three seconds faster than the record set by his own sire. There was some skepticism of the time, as no other clocker's figures matched that of the official clock, but even at the slowest estimate, however, he had beaten the American record for the distance. Following this win, Whisk Broom was described in the press as "the most talked of horse in America." A month after his win in the Suburban it was reported that Whisk Broom had gone "badly lame" and would be unlikely to run again in 1913: in fact he never raced again and was retired to stud.

== Stud record ==
Retired to stand at stud, Whisk Broom II sired 26 winners of what now would be a considered a graded stakes race, including Kentucky Derby winner Whiskery, Preakness Stakes winner Victorian, and the 1922 U.S. Champion Colt, Whiskaway, As well, Whisk Broom II was the damsire of Seabiscuit and Double Jay.

Whisk Broom II died in May 1928 and was interred at the Whitney Farm at Lexington, Kentucky.

== Honors ==
Whisk Broom's performances have seen him being retrospectively selected as the U.S. Champion Older Male Horse and United States Horse of the Year for 1913, but no formal voting or awards took place at the time.

In 1979, Whisk Broom II was inducted in the National Museum of Racing and Hall of Fame.

== Sire line tree ==
- Whisk Broom
  - John P. Grier
    - Boojum
      - Snark
      - Burg-El-Arab
    - Jack High
      - Knave High
      - Lucky Draw
    - El Chico
  - Upset
    - Misstep
    - Windy City
  - Whiskaway
  - Whiskery
  - Diavolo
    - Teufel
  - Victorian
    - He Did
    - Cant Wait
  - Halcyon

== See also ==
- List of racehorses
