= Kelso (horse) =

American-bred Thoroughbred racehorse

- Sire: Your Host
- Grandsire: Alibhai
- Dam: Maid of Flight
- Damsire: Count Fleet
- Sex: Gelding
- Foaled: 1957
- Country: United States
- Color: Dark Bay
- Breeder: Bohemia Stable
- Owner: Bohemia Stable
- Trainer: Dr. John Lee; Carl Hanford
- Rider: Bill Hartack
- Record: 63: 39–12–2
- Earnings: $1,977,896

Major wins
- Hawthorne Gold Cup Handicap (1960); Jockey Club Gold Cup (1960, 1961, 1962, 1963, 1964); Suburban Handicap (1961, 1963); Woodward Stakes (1961, 1962, 1963); Whitney Stakes (1961, 1963, 1965); Aqueduct Handicap (1963, 1964); Gulfstream Park Handicap (1963); John B. Campbell Handicap (1963); Nassau County Handicap (1963); Seminole Handicap (1963); Washington, D.C. International Stakes (1964)

Awards
- Outstanding U.S. 3-Year-Old Male Horse (1960); 3rd New York Handicap Triple Crown (1961); U.S. Champion Older Male Horse (1961–1964); U.S. Horse of the Year (5 times, 1960–1964)

Honors
- U.S. Racing Hall of Hame (1967); Aiken Thoroughbred Racing Hall of Fame (1977) #4 - Top 100 U.S. Racehorses of the 20th Century; Kelso Stakes at Belmont Park

Kelso (April 4, 1957 – October 16, 1983) was a champion American Thoroughbred racehorse who is considered one of the greatest racehorses in history. He ranks fourth on the Top 100 Racehorses of the 20th Century. He defeated more champions and Hall of Fame horses than any other racehorse, and he often carried great handicaps. Some of the champions he defeated are Carry Back, Gun Bow, Bald Eagle, Tompion, Never Bend, Beau Purple, Quadrangle, Roman Brother, Crimson Satan, Jaipur, Ridan, T.V Lark, Mongo, and Pia Star.

== Background ==
Kelso's pedigree was undistinguished. Born at Claiborne Farm near Paris, Kentucky, he was sired by a well-known racehorse who was an unproven stallion, Your Host. Kelso's dam was the unheralded Maid of Flight (although her sire was Count Fleet and her damsire was Man o' War). Kelso was her first foal; he was scrawny, runty and hard to handle. He was a maternal grandson of U.S. Triple Crown champion Count Fleet, who is ranked #5 by The Blood-Horse. Before he set foot on a track, owner Allaire du Pont had him gelded in the hopes of calming him down. According to many, it did not work; Kelso was never a well-mannered horse. He was named for Mrs. du Pont's friend Kelso Everett and, like Mr. Everett, who went by the nickname of "Kelly", so did the horse.

The Right Rev. Arthur Raymond McKinstry was known as Kelso's chaplain. Talking to reporters, McKinstry said, "On the occasion of President Johnson and Mrs. Johnson's 30th wedding anniversary, the White House reporters asked me if I had any other claim to fame. I thought a little while and then had to confess to them that, among my friends in Wilmington, I am casually spoken of as the private chaplain for the great racehorse, Kelso. Taken aback, one reporter turned and asked me, 'Do you mean to say that you direct heavenly words to God on behalf of a racehorse?' 'I don't have to,' I replied. 'Let's say I just sit there with my fingers crossed and hope a little.'"

== Early races ==
Trained by Dr. John Lee and racing for Ms. du Pont's nom de course Bohemia Stable, Kelso, ridden by John Block, made his two-year-old debut on September 4, 1959, at Atlantic City Race Course (at that time one of the country's premier tracks). The race was an ordinary maiden event (which he won). He was lightly regarded in his second start ten days later, when he finished second. The gelding was the favorite in his third race, which was shortly after his second and in which he again placed second. He did not race again as a two-year-old.

== Championship seasons ==
Kelso's three-year-old season began after the Triple Crown races of 1960 were run. Dr. John Lee had returned to his veterinary practice, and Kelso's new trainer was Carl Hanford (inducted into the National Museum of Racing and Hall of Fame in 2006), who handled him for the remainder of his career. Bill Hartack was his jockey for a short time, followed by Eddie Arcaro, who rode Kelso from mid-1960 to November 1961, when he retired as a jockey. In 1962, Ismael Valenzuela became Kelso's principal rider for more than three years.

Kelso's first start as a three-year-old (and first win for Hanford) was at Monmouth Park. Hanford said, "He was an extremely determined horse. If he saw a horse in front, he wanted to get to him. You could take him back or send him to the front. He was an extremely sound horse who was light on his feet with incredible balance. Kelso could wheel on a dime, spinning round in a circle and never letting his feet touch each other." After the Monmouth race, he won eight of his next nine starts: a mile race at Aqueduct Racetrack in a record for a three-year-old at that distance, the Choice Stakes, the Jerome Handicap, the Discovery Handicap, the Lawrence Realization Stakes, the Hawthorne Gold Cup Handicap and the 2 mile Jockey Club Gold Cup (the latter two against older horses). In the Lawrence Realization, he equaled Man O 'War's time of 2 min 40 4/5 s for 1 5/8 miles (2.6 km). In 1960, Kelso was voted Three-Year-Old Champion Male and received the American Horse of the Year award ahead of Bald Eagle.

At age four in 1961, Kelso won seven of nine starts. That year, he was voted Champion Older Horse and again Horse of the Year. In 1962, he won a third Horse of the Year title, taking 28 of the 32 votes in the Daily Racing Form poll. A year later, he was even more dominant, being a unanimous choice for his fourth DRF title, as well as taking the Horse of the Year awards of the Thoroughbred Racing Association and Turf and Sport Digest magazine. Kelso again swept the Horse of the Year awards by all three organisations in 1964.

=== Career highlights ===
- Won eight of nine races (6 of them stakes) in 1960
- Won eleven consecutive races (his last six of 1960 and first five of 1961)
- Carried 130 pounds or more on 24 occasions, winning 13, placing in 5, and finishing third once
- Won 62% of his starts (39 out of 63 starts)
- Finished in the money in 84% of his starts (53 out of 63)
- In 1961, Kelso joined Whisk Broom II and Tom Fool as the third horse in history to win the New York Handicap Triple, made up of the Metropolitan Handicap – in which he carried 130 pounds (59 kg), the Suburban Handicap – in which he carried 133 pounds (60 kg) – and the Brooklyn Handicap, in which he carried 136 pounds (62 kg).
- Still holds the World Record time for two miles on dirt of 3:19.1 set in the 1964 Jockey Club Gold Cup
- Set a new American record for 1 1/2 miles (2.4 km) on the turf of 2:23.4 in the 1964 Washington, D.C. International, set just 11 days after his Jockey Club Gold Cup victory.
- Won the Stymie Handicap at age five in 1962, and at age eight in 1965
- Won an unprecedented five Horse of the Year titles. No other horse in history has won more than three.
- Set nine track records

== Long career ==
Unlike many top racehorses, Kelso took a while to warm up his career. He competed for eight seasons, from 1959 to 1966. As his career reached its zenith, so did his popularity, and huge crowds flocked to see him. Kelso competed on fourteen tracks, won in six states, set nine track records (plus two American records), was the all-time leading money-winner at his retirement and was beloved by racing fans for his courage and consistency.

In March 1966, Kelso suffered a hairline fracture of the inside sesamoid of his right hind foot. Hanford immediately retired him at age nine. Kelso left the track as racing's all-time leading money winner with lifetime earnings of $1,977,896. This earnings record held for 14 years, until it was surpassed by Affirmed in 1979. Of Kelso's 63 starts, he won 39, placed 12 times and finished third twice. He was out of the money 10 times. His record probably would have been even better if not for the huge weight allowances he spotted his rivals under handicap conditions for much of his career.

Accepting his Hall of Fame award in August 2006, Carl Hanford said, "I am here today because of one horse and one horse only. Although I've had a few stakes horses before, they didn't compare with Kelso. There is an old saying on the racetrack that 'a good horse is dangerous in anybody's hands.' How true that is. Of all the top trainers in the past that have had this honor, I may be a little bit prejudiced, but I don't think any one of them had their hands on a horse like Kelso."

One of the greatest turf writers in history, Joe Hirsch, wrote, "Once upon a time there was a horse named Kelso. But only once."

== Retirement ==
As a gelding, Kelso could not be retired to stud. Instead, he went on to a second career as a hunter and show jumper. In 1967, he was elected to the National Museum of Racing and Hall of Fame.

On October 15, 1983, the 26-year-old Kelso paraded prior to the start of the Jockey Club Gold Cup at Belmont Park along with champion gelding Forego and the still active John Henry in front of a crowd of over 32,000 spectators. It was Kelso's final public appearance – he died the next day on October 16, 1983. He is buried in the equine cemetery at Allaire du Pont's Woodstock Farm in Chesapeake City, Maryland.

== Pedigree ==
Pedigree of Kelso (USA) bay gelding 1957
| Sire Your Host (USA) 1947 | Alibhai (GB); 1938 | Hyperion | Gainsborough* |
| Sire Your Host (USA) 1947 | Alibhai (GB); 1938 | Hyperion | Selene |
| Sire Your Host (USA) 1947 | Alibhai (GB); 1938 | Teresina | Tracery |
| Sire Your Host (USA) 1947 | Alibhai (GB); 1938 | Teresina | Blue Tit |
| Sire Your Host (USA) 1947 | Boudoir (GB); 1938 | Mahmoud | Blenheim |
| Sire Your Host (USA) 1947 | Boudoir (GB); 1938 | Mahmoud | Mah Mahal* |
| Sire Your Host (USA) 1947 | Boudoir (GB); 1938 | Kampala | Clarissimus |
| Sire Your Host (USA) 1947 | Boudoir (GB); 1938 | Kampala | La Soupe |
| Dam Maid of Flight 1951 | Count Fleet (USA); 1940 | Reigh Count | Sun Ray |
| Dam Maid of Flight 1951 | Count Fleet (USA); 1940 | Reigh Count | Contessina |
| Dam Maid of Flight 1951 | Count Fleet (USA); 1940 | Quickly | Haste |
| Dam Maid of Flight 1951 | Count Fleet (USA); 1940 | Quickly | Stephanie |
| Dam Maid of Flight 1951 | Maidoduntreath (USA); 1939 | Man o' War | Fair Play |
| Dam Maid of Flight 1951 | Maidoduntreath (USA); 1939 | Man o' War | Mahubah |
| Dam Maid of Flight 1951 | Maidoduntreath (USA); 1939 | Mid Victorian | Victorian |
| Dam Maid of Flight 1951 | Maidoduntreath (USA); 1939 | Mid Victorian | Black Betty (Family: 20) |

* Kelso is inbred 4S x 5S to the stallion Gainsborough, meaning that he appears fourth generation and fifth generation (via Mah Mahal) on the sire side of his pedigree.

== See also ==
- Repeat winners of horse races
- List of racehorses

== Footnotes ==
1. - A male horse who has been castrated for any number of reasons. In Kelso's case, it was cantankerousness. (As a counterpoint to this theory, in his book, A Sound of Horses, David Alexander, the noted racing columnist, who knew Kelso, and his human entourage, stated that Dr. Lee, his trainer and veterinarian, recommended that he be gelded to correct a problem with his stride. It was also hoped it would help him put on weight. Mr. Alexander said that Kelso was a rather shy, even introverted horse, and that when he seemed to be feeling particularly insecure, Mrs. DuPont would give him a chocolate sundae, of which he was inordinately fond. She kept specially wrapped sugar cubes in her pocket for those times when chocolate sundaes were not available.)
2. That year, Venetian Way won the Kentucky Derby, Bally Ache won the Preakness, and Celtic Ash won the Belmont Stakes.
