= Beau Purple =

American-bred Thoroughbred racehorse

- Sire: Beau Gar
- Grandsire: Count Fleet
- Dam: Water Queen
- Damsire: Johnstown
- Sex: Stallion
- Country: United States
- Colour: Bay
- Breeder: Hobeau Farm
- Owner: Hobeau Farm
- Trainer: George P. Odom; H. Allen Jerkens
- Record: 32: 12-4-2
- Earnings: US$445,785

Major wins
- Derby Trial Stakes (1960); Appleton Handicap (1962); Brooklyn Handicap (1962); Hawthorne Gold Cup Handicap (1962); Man o' War Stakes (1962); Suburban Handicap (1962); Widener Handicap (1963)

Beau Purple (foaled in 1957) was an American Thoroughbred racehorse. He is most famous for defeating the champion gelding Kelso and champion colt Carry Back in three of their four meetings.

== Background ==
Thoroughbred breeder Grayce Mar of Long Island initially sold Wall Street mutual-fund developer Jack Dreyfus the mare Water Queen, out of which Beau Purple was the first horse ever born and bred by Hobeau Farm. He was trained by George P. Odom until mid 1962, when H. Allen Jerkens, a 1975 inductee into the U.S. Racing Hall of Fame, took over.

== Racing career ==
After winning the 1960 Derby Trial Stakes, Beau Purple was withdrawn from the Kentucky Derby as a result of a sore left front shin. This injury kept him out of the U.S. Triple Crown series and severely limited his racing for nearly two years. He ran only four times in 1961, but had his best year at age five in 1962. Among his major wins, Beau Purple set a new track record at Belmont Park for the 1 1/2 miles distance in defeating Kelso in the 1962 Man o' War Stakes, and he twice broke the track record for a mile and a quarter on dirt at Aqueduct Racetrack in winning both the 1962 Suburban Handicap and Brooklyn Handicap. In February 1963, Beau Purple beat Kelso for the third time, making it three of four wins over Kelso in his career, when he won the Widener Handicap at Hialeah Park Race Track in Florida.

== Pedigree ==
Pedigree of Beau Purple
Sire Beau Gar	Count Fleet	Reigh Count	Sunreigh
Sire Beau Gar	Count Fleet	Reigh Count	Contessina
Sire Beau Gar	Count Fleet	Quickly	Haste
Sire Beau Gar	Count Fleet	Quickly	Stephanie
Sire Beau Gar	Bellesoeur	Beau Pere	Son-in-Law
Sire Beau Gar	Bellesoeur	Beau Pere	Cinna
Sire Beau Gar	Bellesoeur	Donatrice	Donatello
Sire Beau Gar	Bellesoeur	Donatrice	Tivoli
Dam Water Queen	Johnstown	Jamestown	St. James
Dam Water Queen	Johnstown	Jamestown	Mille. Dazie
Dam Water Queen	Johnstown	La France	Sir Gallahad III
Dam Water Queen	Johnstown	La France	Flambette
Dam Water Queen	Admiral's Lady	War Admiral	Man o' War
Dam Water Queen	Admiral's Lady	War Admiral	Brushup
Dam Water Queen	Admiral's Lady	Boola Brook	Bull Dog
Dam Water Queen	Admiral's Lady	Boola Brook	Brookdale
