= Suburban Stakes =

- Class: Grade II
- Location: Belmont Park; Elmont, New York, USA
- Inaugurated: 1884
- Race type: Thoroughbred – Flat racing
- Website: Suburban Handicap

Race information
- Distance: 1 1/4 miles (10 furlongs)
- Surface: Dirt
- Track: Left-handed
- Qualification: Four-year-olds and up
- Weight: Handicap
- Purse: $500,000 (2026)

The Suburban Stakes (also known Suburban Handicap) is an American Grade II Thoroughbred horse race run annually at Belmont Park in Elmont, New York. Open to horses age three and older, it is now run at the 1 1/4 mile distance on dirt for a $350,000 purse (as of 2023).

Named after the City and Suburban Handicap in England, the Suburban had its 138th running in 2024.

Inaugurated at the Sheepshead Bay Race Track in 1884, it was run there through 1910. However, the 1908 passage of the Hart–Agnew anti-betting legislation by the New York Legislature under Republican Governor Charles Evans Hughes led to a state-wide shutdown of racing in 1911 and 1912. A February 21, 1913 ruling by the New York Supreme Court, Appellate Division saw horse racing return in 1913. Nevertheless, it was too late for the Sheepshead Bay horse racing facility and it never reopened. The race was picked up by the operators of Belmont Park where it was run in 1913. Not run the following year it was hosted by the Empire City Race Track in 1915 before returning to Belmont Park. It has remained there except for the races of 1961 to 1974 and 1976 when it was run at Aqueduct Racetrack.

The Suburban Handicap was contested at a distance of one and one half miles in 1975 and at a mile and three-sixteenths in 1976. Beginning in 1978, the race was started on Belmont Park's clubhouse turn. The event was renamed from the Suburban Handicap in 2017.

The race is the final of the three races that once composed the New York Handicap Triple series of races as it follows the Metropolitan Handicap and the Brooklyn Handicap. Four horses have won the Handicap Triple:

- Whisk Broom II (1913)
- Tom Fool (1953)
- Kelso (1961)
- Fit to Fight (1984)

The list of former winners is like a who's who of the race horse world, featuring some of American racing's most known champions. The first mare to win the Suburban Handicap was the great Hall of Famer, Imp.

== Records ==
Speed record:

- 1:58.33 – In Excess (1991)
- 1:46.58 – Mucho Macho Man (2012) (At distance of 1 1/8 miles)

Margins:

- 10 lengths – Phileas Fogg (2026)

Most wins:

- 2 – Crusader (1926, 1927)
- 2 – Kelso (1961, 1963)
- 2 – Winter's Tale (1980, 1983)
- 2 – Devil His Due (1993, 1994)
- 2 – Flat Out (2010, 2013)
- 2 – Effinex (2015, 2016)
- 2 – Phileas Fogg (2025, 2026)

Most wins by a jockey:

- 8 – Eddie Arcaro (1945, 1947, 1949, 1956, 1957, 1958, 1960, 1961)

Most wins by a trainer:

- 5 – Sam Hildreth (1909, 1915, 1916, 1923, 1924)
- 5 – James Fitzsimmons (1922, 1938, 1951, 1956, 1958)

Most wins by an owner:

- 5 – Ogden Phipps (1951, 1967, 1988, 1989, 1990)
- 5 – Rokeby Stable (1973, 1978, 1980, 1983, 1984)

== Winners ==
Year	Winner	Age	Jockey	Trainer	Owner	Dist. (Miles)	Time	Purse	Gr.
2026	Phileas Fogg	6	Kendrick Carmouche	Gustavo Rodriguez	Jupiter Stable LLC	11/4	2:01.70	$500,000	G2
2025	Phileas Fogg	5	Kendrick Carmouche	Gustavo Rodriguez	Jupiter Stable LLC	11/4	2:02.97	$400,000	G2
2024	Crupi	4	John Velazquez	Todd Pletcher	Repole Stable and St. Elias Stable	11/4	2:02.71	$400,000	G2
2023	Charge It	4	John Velazquez	Todd Pletcher	Whisper Hill Farm	11/4	2:01.31	$192,500	G2
2022	Dynamic One	4	Irad Ortiz Jr.	Todd Pletcher	Repole Stable, Phipps Stable, and St. Elias Stable	11/4	2:01.26	$220,000	G2
2021	Max Player	4	Ricardo Santana Jr.	Steve Asmussen	George E. Hall and SportBLX Thoroughbreds Corp	11/4	2:01.95	$220,000	G2
2020	Tacitus	4	John Velazquez	William I. Mott	Juddmonte Farms Inc	11/4	1:59.51	$200,000	G2
2019	Preservationist	6	Junior Alvarado	James A. Jerkens	Centennial Farms (Don Little Jr.)	11/4	1:59.99	$375,000	G2
2018	Diversify	5	Irad Ortiz Jr.	Richard Violette Jr.	Lauren & Ralph Evans	11/4	1:59.84	$375,000	G2
2017	Keen Ice	5	José Ortiz	Todd Pletcher	Donegal Racing (syndicate) & Calumet Farm	11/4	2:02.02	$400,000	G2
2016	Effinex	5	Mike E. Smith	James A. Jerkens	Tri-Bone Stables (Bernice Cohen)	11/4	2:01.04	$275,000	G2
2015	Effinex	4	Junior Alvarado	James A. Jerkens	Tri-Bone Stables (Bernice Cohen)	11/4	2:01.55	$275,000	G2
2014	Zivo	5	Jose Lezcano	Chad Brown	Thomas Coleman	11/4	2:00.43	$275,000	G2
2013	Flat Out	7	Junior Alvarado	William I. Mott	Preston Stables LLC (Art Preston)	11/8	1:46.87	$210,000	G2
2012	Mucho Macho Man	4	Mike E. Smith	Kathy Ritvo	Dean Reeves	11/8	1:46.58	$210,000	G2
2011	Flat Out	5	Alex Solis	Charles Dickey	Jack Preston	11/8	1:46.64	$180,000	G2
2010	Haynesfield	4	Ramon Domínguez	Steve Asmussen	Turtle Bird Stable	11/8	1:48.52	$180,000	G2
2009	Dry Martini	6	Edgar Prado	Barclay Tagg	Carol Nyren	11/4	2:00.80	$240,000	G2
2008	Frost Giant	5	Rudy Rodriguez	Rick Dutrow	IEAH Stables	11/4	2:01.58	$240,000	G1
2007	Political Force	4	Cornelio Velásquez	H. Allen Jerkens	H. Joseph Allen	11/4	2:00.50	$240,000	G1
2006	Invasor	4	Fernando Jara	Kiaran McLaughlin	Shadwell Stable	11/4	2:01.23	$300,000	G1
2005	Offlee Wild	5	Edgar Prado	Juan Rodriguez	AZ Azalea Stables LLC	11/4	2:00.40	$300,000	G1
2004	Peace Rules	4	Jerry Bailey	Robert J. Frankel	Edmund A. Gann	11/4	1:59.40	$300,000	G1
2003	Mineshaft	4	Robby Albarado	Neil J. Howard	Farish, Elkins, Webber	11/4	2:01.40	$300,000	G1
2002	E Dubai	4	John Velazquez	Saeed bin Suroor	Godolphin Stable	11/4	2:00.80	$300,000	G2
2001	Albert the Great	4	Jorge F. Chavez	Nick Zito	Tracy Farmer	11/4	2:00.20	$300,000	G2
2000	Lemon Drop Kid	4	Edgar Prado	Scotty Schulhofer	Jeanne G. Vance	11/4	1:58.80	$300,000	G2
1999	Behrens	5	Jorge F. Chavez	H. James Bond	Rudlein Stable (Donald & Anne Rudder)	11/4	2:01.06	$240,000	G2
1998	Frisk Me Now	4	Edwin L. King Jr.	Robert J. Durso	Carol R. Dender	11/4	2:00.45	$210,000	G2
1997	Skip Away	4	Shane Sellers	Sonny Hine	Carolyn Hine	11/4	2:02.20	$210,000	G2
1996	Wekiva Springs	5	Mike E. Smith	William I. Mott	Donald R. Dizney & James English	11/4	2:02.78	$300,000	G1
1995	Key Contender	7	Jerry Bailey	Jose A. Martin	Flying Zee Stables	11/4	2:02.20	$210,000	G1
1994	Devil His Due	5	Mike E. Smith	H. Allen Jerkens	Lion Crest Stable (Edith Libutti)	11/4	2:02.40	$210,000	G1
1993	Devil His Due	4	Herb McCauley	H. Allen Jerkens	Lion Crest Stable (Edith Libutti)	11/4	2:01.20	$180,000	G1
1992	Pleasant Tap	5	Eddie Delahoussaye	Christopher Speckert	Buckland Farm	11/4	2:00.20	$300,000	G1
1991	In Excess	4	Gary Stevens	Bruce L. Jackson	Jack J. Munari	11/4	1:58.20	$300,000	G1
1990	Easy Goer	4	Pat Day	Claude R. McGaughey III	Ogden Phipps	11/4	2:00.00	$239,400	G1
1989	Dancing Spree	4	Ángel Cordero Jr.	Claude R. McGaughey III	Ogden Phipps	11/4	2:02.40	$258,720	G1
1988	Personal Flag	5	Pat Day	Claude R. McGaughey III	Ogden Phipps	11/4	2:01.40	$228,060	G1
1987	Broad Brush	4	Ángel Cordero Jr.	Richard W. Small	Robert E. Meyerhoff	11/4	2:03.00	$232,260	G1
1986	Roo Art	4	Pat Day	D. Wayne Lukas	Barbara A. Holleran	11/4	2:01.20	$170,700	G1
1985	Vanlandingham	4	Don MacBeth	Shug McGaughey	Loblolly Stable	11/4	2:01.00	$180,600	G1
1984	Fit To Fight	5	Jerry Bailey	MacKenzie Miller	Rokeby Stable	11/4	2:00.60	$201,300	G1
1983	Winter's Tale	7	Jeffrey Fell	MacKenzie Miller	Rokeby Stable	11/4	2:01.60	$168,600	G1
1982	Silver Buck	4	Don MacBeth	J. Elliott Burch	C. V. Whitney	11/4	1:59.60	$100,620	G1
1981	Temperence Hill	4	Don MacBeth	Joseph B. Cantey	Loblolly Stable	11/4	2:02.00	$100,620	G1
1980	Winter's Tale	4	Jeffrey Fell	MacKenzie Miller	Rokeby Stable	11/4	2:00.60	$92,920	G1
1979	State Dinner	4	Jorge Velásquez	J. Elliott Burch	C. V. Whitney	11/4	2:01.60	$79,125	G1
1978	Upper Nile	4	Jorge Velásquez	MacKenzie Miller	Rokeby Stable	11/4	2:01.80	$63,840	G1
1977	Quiet Little Table	4	Eddie Maple	Philip G. Johnson	Meadowhill	11/4	2:03.00	$63,840	G1
1976	Foolish Pleasure	4	Eddie Maple	LeRoy Jolley	John L. Greer	13/16	1:55.40	$65,280	G1
1975	Forego	5	Heliodoro Gustines	Sherrill W. Ward	Lazy F Ranch	11/2	2:27.80	$66,840	G1
1974	True Knight	5	Ángel Cordero Jr.	Lou Rondinello	Darby Dan Farm	11/4	2:01.40	$68,880	G1
1973	Key To The Mint	4	Braulio Baeza	J. Elliott Burch	Rokeby Stable	11/4	2:00.80	$65,700	G1
1972	Hitchcock	6	Carlos H. Marquez	Pancho Martin	Sigmund Sommer	11/4	2:00.00	$67,980	
1971	Twice Worthy	4	John Ruane	James P. Conway	Saddle Rock Farm (Al Lippe)	11/4	2:02.20	$69,240	
1970	Barometer	5	Ángel Cordero Jr.	Robert J. Frankel	Marion R. Frankel	11/4	2:01.20	$71,565	
1969	Mr. Right	6	Ángel Cordero Jr.	Evan S. Jackson	Dansar Stable (Frank Sinatra, Daniel Schwartz, Milton Rudin)	11/4	2:04.80	$69,550	
1968	Dr. Fager	4	Braulio Baeza	John A. Nerud	Tartan Stable	11/4	1:59.60	$69,615	
1967	Buckpasser	4	Braulio Baeza	Edward A. Neloy	Ogden Phipps	11/4	2:02.20	$71,370	
1966	Buffle	3	Ron Turcotte	Max Hirsch	King Ranch	11/4	2:02.00	$72,085	
1965	Pia Star	4	Johnny Sellers	Clyde Troutt	Ada L. Rice	11/4	2:01.00	$70,720	
1964	Iron Peg	4	Manuel Ycaza	Woody Stephens	Cain Hoy Stable	11/4	2:01.80	$72,500	
1963	Kelso	6	Ismael Valenzuela	Carl Hanford	Bohemia Stable	11/4	2:01.80	$70,525	
1962	Beau Purple	5	William Boland	H. Allen Jerkens	Hobeau Farm	11/4	2:00.60	$68,380	
1961	Kelso	4	Eddie Arcaro	Carl Hanford	Bohemia Stable	11/4	2:02.00	$72,735	
1960	Sword Dancer	4	Eddie Arcaro	J. Elliott Burch	Brookmeade Stable	11/4	2:01.60	$69,165	
1959	Bald Eagle	4	Manuel Ycaza	Woody Stephens	Cain Hoy Stable	11/4	2:01.60	$71,635	
1958	Bold Ruler	4	Eddie Arcaro	James Fitzsimmons	Wheatley Stable	11/4	2:01.00	$43,360	
1957	Traffic Judge	5	Eddie Arcaro	James W. Maloney	Louis P. Doherty	11/4	2:02.60	$58,450	
1956	Nashua	4	Eddie Arcaro	James Fitzsimmons	Leslie Combs II	11/4	2:00.80	$55,900	
1955	Helioscope	4	Sam Boulmetis	Howard Hausner	William G. Helis Jr.	11/4	2:00.60	$61,150	
1954	Straight Face	4	Ted Atkinson	John M. Gaver Sr.	Greentree Stable	11/4	2:03.20	$44,400	
1953	Tom Fool	4	Ted Atkinson	John M. Gaver Sr.	Greentree Stable	11/4	2:00.60	$40,400	
1952	One Hitter	6	Ted Atkinson	John M. Gaver Sr.	Greentree Stable	11/4	2:02.00	$41,900	
1951	Busanda	4	Keith Stuart	James Fitzsimmons	Ogden Phipps	11/4	2:02.60	$42,100	
1950	Loser Weeper	5	Nick Combest	Bill Winfrey	Alfred G. Vanderbilt II	11/4	2:02.00	$41,400	
1949	Vulcan's Forge	4	Eddie Arcaro	Don Cameron	Isaac J. Collins	11/4	2:03.00	$43,200	
1948	Harmonica	4	Warren Mehrtens	Max Hirsch	W. Arnold Hanger	11/4	2:03.00	$39,700	
1947	Assault	4	Eddie Arcaro	Max Hirsch	King Ranch	11/4	2:01.80	$40,100	
1946	Armed	5	Douglas Dodson	Ben A. Jones	Calumet Farm	11/4	2:02.00	$43,000	
1945	Devil Diver	6	Eddie Arcaro	John M. Gaver Sr.	Greentree Stable	11/4	2:04.00	$34,995	
1944	Aletern	5	Herb Lindberg	John H. Skirvin	Alwin C. Ernst	11/4	2:01.20	$39,210	
1943	Don Bingo	4	Joseph Renick	William Post	Binglin Stock Farm	11/4	2:01.40	$27,600	
1942	Market Wise	4	Basil James	George W. Carroll	Louis Tufano	11/4	2:01.80	$27,800	
1941	Your Chance	4	Don Meade	Bert Mulholland	Jessie Widener	11/4	2:02.60	$25,200	
1940	Eight Thirty	4	Harry Richards	Bert Mulholland	George D. Widener Jr.	11/4	2:01.60	$19,850	
1939	Cravat	4	Jack Westrope	Walter Burrows	Townsend B. Martin	11/4	2:02.80	$17,750	
1938	Snark	5	Johnny Longden	James Fitzsimmons	Wheatley Stable	11/4	2:01.40	$17,050	
1937	Aneroid	4	Charley Rosengarten	Dion K. Kerr	John A. Manfuso	11/4	2:01.60	$10,950	
1936	Firethorn	4	Harry Richards	Preston M. Burch	Walter M. Jeffords	11/4	2:04.60	$12,125	
1935	Head Play	5	Charles Kurtsinger	J. Thomas Taylor	Suzanne B. Mason	11/4	2:02.00	$12,175	
1934	Ladysman	4	Silvio Coucci	Bud Stotler	William R. Coe	11/4	2:02.60	$5,750	
1933	Equipoise	5	Raymond Workman	Thomas J. Healey	C. V. Whitney	11/4	2:02.00	$7,250	
1932	White Clover II	6	Raymond Workman	Preston M. Burch	Foxcatcher Farms	11/4	2:03.40	$11,100	
1931	Mokatam	4	Alfred Robertson	Frank M. Taylor	Rancocas Stable	11/4	2:02.40	$11,200	
1930	Petee-Wrack	5	Earl Sande	Willie Booth	John R. Macomber	11/4	2:07.40	$11,850	
1929	Bateau	4	Eddie Ambrose	Scott P. Harlan	Walter M. Jeffords	11/4	2:03.40	$14,100	
1928	Dolan	4	John Callahan	Edward W. Heffner	Edward F. Cooney	11/4	2:06.60	$13,675	
1927	Crusader	4	Clarence Kummer	George Conway	Glen Riddle Farm	11/4	2:02.40	$11,875	
1926	Crusader	3	John Callahan	George Conway	Glen Riddle Farm	11/4	2:03.00	$13,150	
1925	Sting	4	Bennie Breuning	Jimmy Johnson	James Butler	11/4	2:04.20	$11,300	
1924	Mad Hatter	8	Earl Sande	Sam Hildreth	Rancocas Stable	11/4	2:03.60	$9,150	
1923	Grey Lag	5	Earl Sande	Sam Hildreth	Rancocas Stable	11/4	2:03.00	$7,800	
1922	Captain Alcock	5	Clyde Ponce	James Fitzsimmons	Quincy Stable (James Francis Johnson)	11/4	2:05.40	$8,200	
1921	Audacious	5	Clarence Kummer	Sandy McNaughton	Foreign Stable	11/4	2:02.20	$8,100	
1920	Paul Jones	3	Andy Schuttinger	William M. Garth	Ral Parr	11/4	2:09.60	$6,350	
1919	Corn Tassel	5	Lavelle Ensor	Thomas J. Healey	Richard T. Wilson Jr.	11/4	2:02.20	$5,200	
1918	Johren	3	Frank Robinson	Albert Simons	Harry Payne Whitney	11/4	2:06.00	$5,850	
1917	Boots	6	Johnny Loftus	Walter B. Jennings	A. Kingsley Macomber	11/4	2:05.20	$4,900	
1916	Friar Rock	3	Mack Garner	Sam Hildreth	August Belmont Jr.	11/4	2:05.00	$3,450	
1915	Stromboli	4	Clarence Turner	Sam Hildreth	August Belmont Jr.	11/4	2:05.40	$3,925	
1914	Race not held								
1913	Whisk Broom II	6	Joe Notter	James G. Rowe Sr.	Harry Payne Whitney	11/4	2:00.00	$3,000	
1912	No races held due to the Hart–Agnew Law								
1911	No races held due to the Hart–Agnew Law								
1910	Olambala	4	George Archibald	Thomas J. Healey	Richard T. Wilson Jr.	11/4	2:04.40	$4,800	
1909	Fitz Herbert	3	Eddie Dugan	Sam Hildreth	Sam Hildreth	11/4	2:03.40	$3,850	
1908	Ballot	4	Joe Notter	James G. Rowe Sr.	James R. Keene	11/4	2:03.00	$19,750	
1907	Nealon	4	Willie Dugan	Frank M. Taylor	Charles E. Durnell	11/4	2:06.40	$16,800	
1906	Go Between	5	Willie Shaw	John Shields	Alex Shields	11/4	2:05.20	$16,800	
1905	Beldame	4	Frank O'Neill	John J. Hyland	August Belmont Jr.	11/4	2:05.40	$16,800	
1904	Hermis	5	Arthur Redfern	William Shields	Edward R. Thomas	11/4	2:05.00	$16,800	
1903	Africander	3	Grover Fuller	Richard O. Miller	Hampton Stable (Charles F. Dwyer & Simon Deimel)	11/4	2:10.40	$16,490	
1902	Gold Heels	4	Otto Wonderly	Matthew M. Allen	Fred C. McLewee/Brady	11/4	2:05.20	$7,800	
1901	Alcedo	4	Henry Spencer	James H. McCormick	Louis V. Bell	11/4	2:05.60	$7,800	
1900	Kinley Mack	4	Patrick McCue	Peter Wimmer	Augustus Eastin & Samuel E. Larabie	11/4	2:06.80	$6,800	
1899	Imp	5	Nash Turner	Charles E. Brossman	Daniel R. Harness	11/4	2:05.80	$6,800	
1898	Tillo	4	Alonzo Clayton	John W. Rogers	John W. Rogers & Robert L. Rose	11/4	2:08.20	$6,800	
1897	Ben Brush	4	Willie Simms	Hardy Campbell Jr.	Michael F. Dwyer	11/4	2:07.20	$6,800	
1896	Henry of Navarre	5	Henry Griffin	John J. Hyland	Blemton Stable	11/4	2:07.00	$5,850	
1895	Lazzarone	4	Anthony Hamilton	William Donohue	Eric Stable	11/4	2:07.80	$5,850	
1894	Ramapo	4	Fred Taral	John J. Hyland	David Gideon & John Daly	11/4	2:06.20	$4,730	
1893	Lowlander	5	Patsy McDermott	Fred Lowe	Fred Lowe	11/4	2:06.60	$12,070	
1892	Montana	4	Edward Garrison	Matthew Byrnes	Marcus Daly	11/4	2:07.40	$17,750	
1891	Loantaka	5	Marty Bergen	David W. McConn	David W. McConn	11/4	2:07.00	$9,900	
1890	Salvator	4	Isaac Burns Murphy	Matthew Byrnes	James Ben Ali Haggin	11/4	2:06.80	$6,900	
1889	Raceland	4	Edward Garrison	James G. Rowe Sr.	August Belmont Sr.	11/4	2:09.80	$6,900	
1888	Elkwood	5	Willie Martin	James B. Dyer	Walter Gratz	11/4	2:07.50	$6,812	
1887	Eurus	4	G. Davis	John Huggins	Alexander Cassatt	11/4	2:12.00	$6,065	
1886	Troubadour	4	William Fitzpatrick	John W. Rogers	Samuel S. Brown	11/4	2:12.25	$5,697	
1885	Pontiac	4	Harris Olney	Matthew Byrnes	Rancocas Stable	11/4	2:09.50	$5,855	
1884	General Monroe	6	William Donohue	Walter C. Rollins	Edward J. McElmeel	11/4	2:11.75	$4,945	

== See also ==
- Suburban Stakes top three finishers and starters
