= Clyde Troutt =

American horse trainer

Personal information
- Born: August 23, 1901 Illinois, United States
- Died: October 1979 (aged 78)
- Occupation: Trainer / Owner

Horse racing career
- Sport: Horse racing

Major racing wins
- New Orleans Handicap (1938, 1940); Stars and Stripes Handicap (1942); Lincoln Handicap (1943, 1945, 1949); Meadowland Handicap (1944, 1945, 1947); Everglades Stakes (1950, 1953); Jersey Stakes (1953); Shevlin Stakes (1958, 1959); Top Flight Handicap (1958); Massachusetts Handicap (1959, 1960, 1962); Excelsior Handicap (1960); Fashion Stakes (1960); Jamaica Handicap (1960); Sorority Stakes (1960); Carter Handicap (1961); Sapling Stakes (1962); Fall Highweight Handicap (1964); Gravesend Handicap (1964); Brooklyn Handicap (1965); Cowdin Stakes (1965); Equipoise Mile Handicap (1965); Hanshin Cup (1965); Suburban Handicap (1965); Widener Handicap (1966); Comely Stakes (1967); Seminole Handicap (1967); Toboggan Handicap (1967); Westchester Handicap (1967); Lexington Handicap (1970)

Significant horses
- Air Pilot, Pia Star, Talent Show, Take Wing

Clyde Troutt (August 23, 1901 – October, 1979) was an American trainer of Thoroughbred racehorses. From Benton, Illinois, on March 15, 1938 Troutt replaced Frank Hackett as one of the trainers of the prominent John and Fannie Hertz stable. For his own account, he claimed Take Wing in early July 1942 for $3,000 and who would then earn more than $160,000 and set a new North American record for a mile and three-sixteenths on turf.

== Triple Crown races ==
Among Troutt's other successful horses was Royal Bay Gem (b. 1950). The colt won five stakes races in 1953 including the Everglades Stakes and Jersey Stakes. After finishing fourth to half-brother Dark Star in the Kentucky Derby, he defeated Dark Star in the Preakness Prep before finishing third to Native Dancer in both the Preakness Stakes and Belmont Stakes. Troutt also trained Advocator who ran second to Kauai King in the 1966 Kentucky Derby.

In October 1958 Clyde Troutt entered into his most successful arrangement when he signed on as the head trainer for the racing stable Dan and Ada Rice, owners of Danada Farm in Wheaton in DuPage County, Illinois and its satellite farm near Lexington, Kentucky.
