= Metropolitan Handicap =

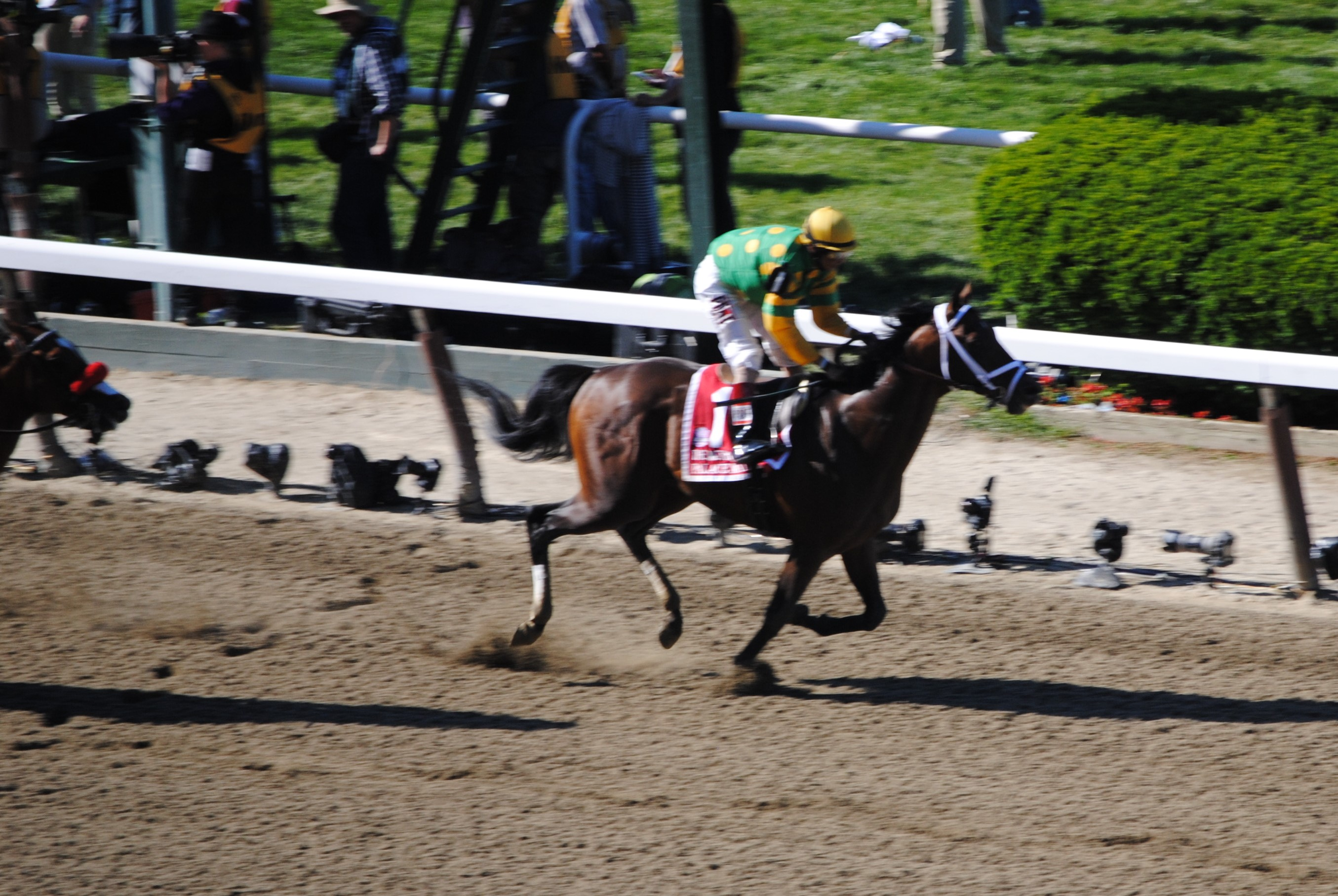
- Palace Malice winning the 2014 Metropolitan Handicap
- Class: Grade 1
- Location: Belmont Park; Elmont, New York, USA
- Inaugurated: 1891
- Race type: Thoroughbred – Flat racing
- Website: Metropolitan (NYRA)

Race information
- Distance: 1 mile (8 furlongs)
- Surface: Dirt
- Track: left-handed
- Qualification: Three-year-olds & up
- Weight: Handicap
- Purse: $1,000,000 (2026)

The Metropolitan Handicap, frequently called the "Met Mile", is an American Grade I Thoroughbred horse race held at Belmont Park in Elmont, New York. Open to horses age three and older, it is contested on dirt over a distance of one mile (8 furlongs). Starting in 2014, it is now run on the same day as the Belmont Stakes in early June.

The Met Mile is one of the most prestigious American races outside of the Triple Crown and Breeders' Cup. It is known as a "stallion-making race" as the distance of a mile often displays the winner's "brilliance", referring to an exceptional turn of foot. Winners of the race who went on to become notable stallions include Tom Fool (1953), Native Dancer (1954), Buckpasser (1967), Fappiano (1981), Gulch (1987–88), and Ghostzapper (2005).

== History ==
The Met Mile was first run in 1891 at Morris Park Racetrack. Prior to 1897, it was run at a distance of 1 1/8 miles. In 1904, its location was moved to Belmont Park. There it remained except for nine years; 1960 to 1967, 1969, and 1975 when it was hosted by Aqueduct Racetrack. It was not run in 1895, 1911, and 1912.

The Met Mile was the first of three races in the New York Handicap Triple series, followed by the Suburban Handicap and Brooklyn Handicap. Four horses have won the Handicap Triple:

- Whisk Broom II (1913)
- Tom Fool (1953)
- Kelso (1961)
- Fit to Fight (1984)

The Met Mile and the Brooklyn are now run on the same day as part of the Belmont Stakes undercard, so it is no longer possible to complete the Handicap Triple.

There was a Dead Heat for first in 1905.

== Records ==
Time record:

- 1:32.73 – Frosted (2016)

Largest Margin

- 14 1/4 – Frosted (2016)

Most wins by an owner

- 6 – Greentree Stable (1940, 1943, 1944, 1945, 1953, 1963)

Most wins by a jockey

- 5 – John Velazquez (1996, 1999, 2010, 2012, 2014)

Most wins by a trainer

- 6 – John M. Gaver Sr. (1940, 1943, 1944, 1945, 1953, 1963)

== Winners ==
Year	Winner	Age	Jockey	Trainer	Owner	Time	Gr.
2026	Nysos	5	Flavien Prat	Bob Baffert	Baoma Corp, Mrs. John Magnier, Michael B. Tabor, Derrick Smith	1:34.85	I
2025	Raging Torrent	4	Frankie Dettori	Doug O'Neill	Yueshang Zhang & Craig Dado	1:35.89	I
2024	National Treasure	4	Flavien Prat	Bob Baffert	SF Racing LLC, Starlight Racing, Madaket Stables LLC, Robert E. Masterson, Stonestreet Stables LLC, Jay A.Schoenfarber, Waves Edge Capital LLC and Catherine Donovan	1:35.12	I
2023	Cody's Wish	5	Junior Alvarado	William I. Mott	Godolphin	1:34.36	I
2022	Flightline	4	Flavien Prat	John W. Sadler	Horonis Racing, Summer Wind Equine, West Point Thoroughbreds, & Siena Farm	1:33.59	I
2021	Silver State	4	Ricardo Santana Jr.	Steve Asmussen	Winchell Thoroughbreds LLC and Willis Horton Racing LLC	1:35.45	I
2020	Vekoma	4	Javier Castellano	George Weaver	R A Hill Stable & Gatsas Stables	1:32.88	I
2019	Mitole	4	Ricardo Santana Jr.	Steven M. Asmussen	William & Corinne Heiligbrodt	1:32.75	I
2018	Bee Jersey	4	Ricardo Santana Jr.	Steven M. Asmussen	Charles E. Fipke	1:33.13	I
2017	Mor Spirit	4	Mike E. Smith	Bob Baffert	Michael Lund Petersen	1:33.71	I
2016	Frosted	4	Joel Rosario	Kiaran McLaughlin	Godolphin	1:32.73	I
2015	Honor Code	4	Javier Castellano	Shug McGaughey	Lane's End Racing	1:33.18	I
2014	Palace Malice	4	John Velazquez	Todd Pletcher	Dogwood Stable	1:33.56	I
2013	Sahara Sky	4	Joel Rosario	Jerry Hollendorfer	Goldmark Farm	1:34.17	I
2012	Shackleford	4	John Velazquez	Dale Romans	Lauffer/Cubbedge	1:33.30	I
2011	Tizway	6	Rajiv Maragh	H. James Bond	William Clifton Jr.	1:32.90	I
2010	Quality Road	4	John Velazquez	Todd Pletcher	Edward P. Evans	1:33.11	I
2009	Bribon	6	Alan Garcia	Rob Ribaudo	Marc Keller	1:34.15	I
2008	Divine Park	4	Alan Garcia	Kiaran McLaughlin	James J. Barry	1:36.91	I
2007	Corinthian	4	Kent Desormeaux	James A. Jerkens	Centennial Farms	1:34.77	I
2006	Silver Train	4	Edgar Prado	Richard E. Dutrow Jr.	Buckram Oak Farm	1:34.27	I
2005	Ghostzapper	5	Javier Castellano	Robert J. Frankel	Stronach Stables	1:33.20	I
2004	Pico Central	5	Alex Solis	Paulo Lobo	Gary A. Tanaka	1:35.40	I
2003	Aldebaran	5	Jerry D. Bailey	Robert J. Frankel	Flaxman Holdings	1:34.00	I
2002	Swept Overboard	5	Jorge F. Chavez	Craig Dollase	J. Paul Reddam	1:33.20	I
2001	Exciting Story	4	Patrick Husbands	Mark E. Casse	Harry T. Mangurian Jr.	1:37.00	I
2000	Yankee Victor	4	Heberto Castillo Jr.	Carlos Morales	Moreton Binn	1:34.60	I
1999	Sir Bear	6	John Velazquez	Ralph Ziade	Barbara Smollin	1:34.40	I
1998	Wild Rush	4	Jerry D. Bailey	Richard Mandella	Stronach Stables	1:33.40	I
1997	Langfuhr	5	Jorge F. Chavez	Mike Keogh	Gus Schickedanz	1:33.00	I
1996	Honour and Glory	3	John Velazquez	D. Wayne Lukas	Michael Tabor	1:32.80	I
1995	You And I	4	Jorge F. Chavez	Robert J. Frankel	Edmund A. Gann	1:34.60	I
1994	Holy Bull	3	Mike E. Smith	Jimmy Croll	Jimmy Croll	1:33.80	I
1993	Ibero	6	Laffit Pincay Jr.	Ron McAnally	Frank E. Whitham	1:34.20	I
1992	Dixie Brass	3	Julio Pezua	Dennis J. Brida	Michael Watral	1:33.60	I
1991	In Excess	4	Pat Valenzuela	Bruce L. Jackson	Jack J. Munari	1:35.40	I
1990	Criminal Type	5	José A. Santos	D. Wayne Lukas	Calumet Farm	1:34.40	I
1989	Proper Reality	4	Jerry D. Bailey	Robert E. Holthus	Mrs. James A. Winn	1:34.00	I
1988	Gulch	4	José A. Santos	D. Wayne Lukas	Peter M. Brant	1:34.60	I
1987	Gulch	3	Pat Day	LeRoy Jolley	Peter M. Brant	1:34.80	I
1986	Garthorn	6	Rafael Meza	Robert J. Frankel	Jerome S. Moss	1:33.60	I
1985	Forzando	4	Don MacBeth	John Sullivan	S. C. Chillingworth	1:34.40	I
1984	Fit to Fight	5	Jerry D. Bailey	MacKenzie Miller	Rokeby Stable	1:34.00	I
1983	Star Choice	4	Jorge Velásquez	John M. Veitch	Frances A. Genter	1:33.80	I
1982	Conquistador Cielo	3	Eddie Maple	Woody Stephens	Henryk de Kwiatkowski	1:33.00	I
1981	Fappiano	4	Ángel Cordero Jr.	Jan H. Nerud	John A. Nerud	1:33.80	I
1980	Czaravich	4	Laffit Pincay Jr.	William H. Turner Jr.	William L. Reynolds	1:35.80	I
1979	State Dinner	4	Chris McCarron	William E. Burch	C. V. Whitney	1:34.00	I
1978	Cox's Ridge	4	Eddie Maple	Joseph B. Cantey	Loblolly Stable	1:34.60	I
1977	Forego	7	Bill Shoemaker	Frank Whiteley	Lazy F Ranch	1:34.80	I
1976	Forego	6	Heliodoro Gustines	Frank Whiteley	Lazy F Ranch	1:34.80	I
1975	Gold and Myrrh	4	Walter Blum	William F. Wilmot	William B. Wilmot	1:33.60	I
1974	Arbees Boy	4	Eddie Maple	George Weckerle	Otly Stable	1:34.40	I
1973	Tentam	4	Jorge Velásquez	MacKenzie Miller	Cragwood Stables	1:35.00	I
1972	Executioner	4	Eddie Belmonte	Eddie Yowell	October House Farm	1:35.40	
1971	Tunex	5	John Ruane	H. Allen Jerkens	Hobeau Farm	1:35.80	
1970	Nodouble	5	Jorge Tejeira	J. Bert Sonnier	Verna Lea Farm	1:34.60	
1969	Arts and Letters	3	Jean Cruguet	J. Elliott Burch	Rokeby Stable	1:34.00	
1968	In Reality	4	John L. Rotz	Melvin Calvert	Frances A. Genter	1:35.00	
1967	Buckpasser	4	Braulio Baeza	Edward A. Neloy	Ogden Phipps	1:34.60	
1966	Bold Lad	4	Braulio Baeza	Edward A. Neloy	Wheatley Stable	1:34.20	
1965	Gun Bow	5	Walter Blum	Edward A. Neloy	Gedney Farm	1:34.40	
1964	Olden Times	6	Henry Moreno	Mesh Tenney	Rex C. Ellsworth	1:34.40	
1963	Cyrano	4	Bobby Ussery	John M. Gaver Sr.	Greentree Stable	1:35.00	
1962	Carry Back	4	John L. Rotz	Jack A. Price	Katherine Price	1:33.60	
1961	Kelso	4	Eddie Arcaro	Carl Hanford	Bohemia Stable	1:35.60	
1960	Bald Eagle	5	Manuel Ycaza	Woody Stephens	Cain Hoy Stable	1:33.60	
1959	Sword Dancer	3	Bill Shoemaker	J. Elliott Burch	Brookmeade Stable	1:35.20	
1958	Gallant Man	4	Bill Shoemaker	John A. Nerud	Ralph Lowe	1:35.60	
1957	Traffic Judge	5	Eddie Arcaro	James W. Maloney	Louis P. Doherty	1:36.00	
1956	Midafternoon	4	William Boland	Thomas M. Waller	Mrs. Edward E. Robbins	1:35.00	
1955	High Gun	4	Anthony DeSpirito	Max Hirsch	King Ranch	1:35.60	
1954	Native Dancer	4	Eric Guerin	Bill Winfrey	Alfred G. Vanderbilt II	1:35.20	
1953	Tom Fool	4	Ted Atkinson	John M. Gaver Sr.	Greentree Stable	1:35.80	
1952	Mameluke	4	Gerald Porch	Sylvester Veitch	C. V. Whitney	1:36.40	
1951	Casemate	4	Dave Gorman	Robert Dotter	James Cox Brady Jr.	1:35.40	
1950	Greek Ship	3	Hedley Woodhouse	Preston M. Burch	Brookmeade Stable	1:36.60	
1949	Loser Weeper	4	Hedley Woodhouse	Bill Winfrey	Alfred G. Vanderbilt II	1:36.40	
1948	Stymie	7	Conn McCreary	Hirsch Jacobs	Ethel D. Jacobs	1:36.80	
1947	Stymie	6	Basil James	Hirsch Jacobs	Ethel D. Jacobs	1:37.40	
1946	Gallorette	4	Job Dean Jessop	Edward A. Christmas	William L. Brann	1:37.00	
1945	Devil Diver	6	Ted Atkinson	John M. Gaver Sr.	Greentree Stable	1:36.40	
1944	Devil Diver	5	Ted Atkinson	John M. Gaver Sr.	Greentree Stable	1:35.80	
1943	Devil Diver	4	George Woolf	John M. Gaver Sr.	Greentree Stable	1:36.60	
1942	Attention	4	Don Meade	Max Hirsch	Mrs. Parker Corning	1:36.40	
1941	Eight Thirty	5	Harry Richards	Bert Mulholland	George D. Widener Jr.	1:37.20	
1940	Third Degree	4	Eddie Arcaro	John M. Gaver Sr.	Greentree Stable	1:35.40	
1939	Knickerbocker	3	Fred A. Smith	Pete Coyne	Joseph E. Widener	1:37.20	
1938	Danger Point	4	Eddie Arcaro	Eddie Hayward	James D. Norris	1:38.00	
1937	Snark	4	Johnny Longden	James Fitzsimmons	Wheatley Stable	1:37.80	
1936	Good Harvest	4	Sam Renick	Bud Stotler	Alfred G. Vanderbilt II	1:36.40	
1935	King Saxon	4	Calvin Rainey	Charles H. Knebelkamp	Charles H. Knebelkamp	1:38.20	
1934	Mr. Khayyam	4	Robert Jones	Matthew P. Brady	Catawba Farm	1:37.00	
1933	Equipoise	5	Raymond Workman	Thomas J. Healey	C. V. whitney	1:37.40	
1932	Equipoise	4	Raymond Workman	Thomas J. Healey	C. V. whitney	1:37.00	
1931	Questionnaire	4	Raymond Workman	Andy Schuttinger	James Butler	1:38.60	
1930	Jack High	4	Linus McAtee	A. Jack Joyner	George D. Widener Jr.	1:35.00	
1929	Petee-Wrack	4	Steve O'Donnell	Willie Booth	John R. Macomber	1:40.00	
1928	Nimba	4	Harold Thurber	George M. Odom	Marshall Field III	1:40.00	
1927	Black Maria	4	Frank Coltiletti	William H. Karrick	William R. Coe	1:37.40	
1926	Sarazen	5	Fred Weiner	Max Hirsch	Fair Stable	1:38.00	
1925	Sting	4	Bennie Breuning	Jimmy Johnson	James Butler	1:37.00	
1924	Laurano	3	Harold Thurber	Johnny Loftus	Oak Ridge Stable	1:38.20	
1923	Grey Lag	5	Earl Sande	Sam Hildreth	Rancocas Stable	1:38.00	
1922	Mad Hatter	6	Earl Sande	Sam Hildreth	Rancocas Stable	1:36.60	
1921	Mad Hatter	5	Earl Sande	Sam Hildreth	Rancocas Stable	1:37.40	
1920	Wildair	3	Eddie Ambrose	James G. Rowe Sr.	Harry Payne Whitney	1:38.80	
1919	Lanius	4	Johnny Loftus	A. Jack Joyner	George D. Widener Jr.	1:42.40	
1918	Trompe La Mort	3	Linus McAtee	Thomas Welsh	Joseph E. Widener	1:38.40	
1917	Ormesdale	4	John McTaggart	Thomas J. Healey	Richard T. Wilson Jr.	1:39.20	
1916	The Finn	4	Andy Schuttinger	Edward W. Heffner	Harry C. Hallenbeck	1:38.00	
1915	Stromboli	4	Clarence Turner	Sam Hildreth	August Belmont Jr.	1:39.80	
1914	Buskin	4	Charles Fairbrother	John Whalen	John Whalen	1:37.80	
1913	Whisk Broom II	6	Joe Notter	James G. Rowe Sr.	Harry Payne Whitney	1:39.00	
1912	no race						
1911	no race						
1910	Fashion Plate	4	Matt McGee	William H. Karrick	Oneck Stable	1:37.80	
1909	King James	4	Guy Burns	John E. Madden	Sam Hildreth	1:40.00	
1908	Jack Atkin	4	Carroll H. Shilling	Herman R. Brandt	Barney Schreiber	1:38.60	
1907	Glorifier	5	Charles Garner	James H. McCormick	James H. McCormick	1:40.80	
1906	Grapple	4	Charles Garner	Enoch Wishard	John A. Drake	1:39.00	
1905	Race King (DH)	4	L. Smith	Jim McLaughlin	Orville L. Richards	1:41.60	
1905	Sysonby (DH)	3	Willie Shaw	James G. Rowe Sr.	James R. Keene	1:41.60	
1904	Irish Lad	4	Willie Shaw	John E. Madden	Herman B. Duryea	1:40.00	
1903	Gunfire	4	Tommy Burns	John W. Rogers	William C. Whitney	1:38.00	
1902	Arsenal	3	J. Daly	Julius Bauer	Arthur L. Featherstone	1:42.50	
1901	Banastar	6	George M. Odom	Charles F. Hill	Charles H. Mackay	1:42.00	
1900	Ethelbert	4	Danny Maher	A. Jack Joyner	Perry Belmont	1:41.00	
1899	Filigrane	4	Richard Clawson	R. Wyndham Walden	A. H. Morris & D. H. Morris	1:39.25	
1898	Bowling Brook	3	Pete Clay	R. Wyndham Walden	A. H. Morris & D. H. Morris	1:44.00	
1897	Voter	3	John Lamley	William Lakeland	James R. Keene	1:40.00	
1896	Counter Tenor	4	Anthony Hamilton	William Lakeland	Jacob Ruppert Jr.	1:53.00	
1895	no race						
1894	Ramapo	4	Fred Taral	John J. Hyland	Gideon & Daly	1:52.50	
1893	Charade	4	Samuel Doggett	William R. Jones	William R. Jones	1:52.25	
1892	Pessara	4	Fred Taral	John S. Campbell	Alfred F. Walcott & J. S. Campbell	1:54.00	
1891	Tristan	3	George Taylor	Louis Stuart	L. Stuart & Co.	1:51.50	

== See also ==
- Metropolitan Handicap top three finishers and starters
