= Gun Bow =

American Thoroughbred racehorse

- Sire: Gun Shot
- Grandsire: Hyperion
- Dam: Ribbons and Bows
- Damsire: War Admiral
- Sex: Stallion
- Foaled: 1960
- Country: United States
- Colour: Bay
- Breeder: Maine Chance Farm
- Owner: Gedney Farms
- Trainer: Edward A. Neloy
- Record: 42: 17-8-4
- Earnings: $798,722

Major wins
- Narragansett Special (1963); Brooklyn Handicap (1964); Gulfstream Park Handicap (1964); San Antonio Handicap (1964, 1965); San Fernando Stakes (1964); Strub Stakes (1964); Washington Park Handicap (1964); Whitney Handicap (1964); Woodward Stakes (1964); Donn Handicap (1965); Metropolitan Handicap (1965)

Honours
- United States' Racing Hall of Fame (1999)
- Last updated on April 15, 2007

Gun Bow (1960 – December 1979) was an American Thoroughbred racehorse. He was one of America's leading older male racehorses in 1964 and 1965 and was later inducted into the Hall of Fame. Gun Bow was noted for his rivalry with five-time American Horse of the Year Kelso.

== Background ==
Owned and bred by cosmetics tycoon Elizabeth Arden at her Maine Chance Farm, Gun Bow was sired by Gun Shot, a son of Hyperion, the 1933 Epsom Derby winner and a six-time leading sire in Great Britain & Ireland. He was out of the mare Ribbons and Bows, a daughter of 1937 U.S. Triple Crown champion War Admiral.

Lameness kept Gun Bow out of racing at age two and as a result of American tax laws at the time, Arden sold Gun Bow in December 1962 to Harry Albert and Mrs. John Stanley of New Jersey, who raced him under the name Gedney Farms. He was conditioned by future Hall of Fame trainer Edward A. Neloy.

== Racing career ==
As a three-year-old in 1963, Gun Bow won six of his eighteen starts. His most significant 1963 win came in the Narragansett Special at Narragansett Park in Pawtucket, Rhode Island. However, by age four he had developed into a powerful runner and a major rival for Kelso.

In his 1964 season, Gun Bow traveled across the United States. He raced in California as well as at Arlington Park in the Midwest, plus at tracks on the East Coast, from New York thorough Florida. He won eight of his sixteen starts, including three important graded stakes races on the West Coast, and had wins in major East Coast races such as the Woodward Stakes. He defeated Kelso by twelve lengths in the Brooklyn Handicap while setting a new track record for 10 furlongs. He gave the U.S. a one-two finish against an international field when he came in second to Kelso in record time in the Washington, D.C. International. In September, his owners syndicated 60% of Gun Bow to a group led by John R. Gaines, which included former owner, Elizabeth Arden. For the 1964 racing year, Gun Bow had earnings of more than $580,000.

Racing at age five, Gun Bow won three of eight starts, claiming his second straight San Antonio Handicap in California plus the Metropolitan and Donn Handicaps in the East.

== Stud career ==
Gun Bow retired to stud duty after his 1965 racing season, but his offspring met with modest racing success. Notably, his outstanding daughter Pistol Packer won several Group One races in France, including the 1971 Prix de Diane. In 1974, Gun Bow was sold to a breeding farm in Japan where he died in December 1979.

In 1999, Gun Bow was inducted into the United States' National Museum of Racing and Hall of Fame.
