= Brooklyn Stakes =

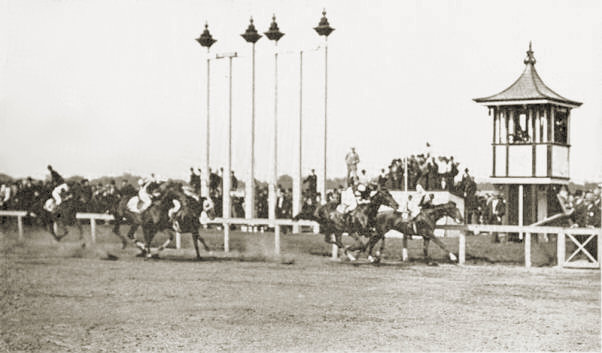
- "The Picket" winning the 1904 Brooklyn Handicap
- Class: Grade II
- Location: Belmont Park; Elmont, New York, USA
- Inaugurated: 1887
- Race type: Thoroughbred – Flat racing
- Website: www.nyra.com/belmont/racing/stakes-schedule/brooklyn-invitational/

Race information
- Distance: 1 1/2 miles (12 furlongs)
- Surface: Dirt
- Track: Left-handed
- Qualification: Four-year-olds & up
- Weight: 124 lbs. with allowances
- Purse: $250,000-added (2023)

The Brooklyn Stakes (formerly known as the Brooklyn Handicap) is an American Thoroughbred horse race run at Belmont Park in Elmont, New York, on Long Island. It currently is a Grade II event open to four-year-olds and up willing to race one and one-half miles on dirt. It was a Grade 1 race prior to 1993.

== Historical notes ==
First run on May 14, 1887, at Gravesend Race Track on Coney Island, New York, it was won by Emery & Cotton's Dry Monopole in track record time for the mile and one-quarter distance. A versatile horse, a year earlier on June 15, 1886, Dry Monopole had won America's first ever Thoroughbred flat race on turf. The Brooklyn Handicap quickly became one of the top attractions on the New York racing circuit, drawing some of the best Thoroughbreds.

The race was once the second leg of what is sometimes referred to as the New York Handicap Triple series of races. It was preceded by the Metropolitan Handicap and followed by the Suburban Handicap. Four horses won the Handicap Triple:

- Whisk Broom II (1913)
- Tom Fool (1953)
- Kelso (1961)
- Fit to Fight (1984)

Since inception the race has been held at:

- Gravesend Race Track : 1887–1910
- Aqueduct Racetrack : 1914–1944, 1946–1955, 1960–1974, 1976, 2024
- Jamaica Race Course : 1956, 1958–1959
- Belmont Park : 1957, 1975, 1977–2023

The Brooklyn Handicap has been contested at a variety of distances:

- 1 1/8 miles : 1915–1939, 1994–2007
- 1 3/16 miles : 1956–1959, 1972–1974
- 1 1/4 miles : 1887–1914, 1940–1955, 1960–1971, 1975–1976
- 1 3/8 miles : 1991–1993, 2024
- 1 1/2 miles : 1977–1990, 2008–2023

The 2024 Brooklyn Stakes was run at Aqueduct Racetrack due to construction at Belmont Park. In May 2025 it was announced that the Brooklyn would not be run that year, with plans to return it to the racing schedule at Belmont in the fall of 2026. The decision would allow the race to retain its Grade II status.

== Records ==
World record: (for 1^{3}/_{16} miles in 1:52^{2}/_{5} (1:52.40) minutes) On July 4, 1973, the four-year-old Riva Ridge set a world record for racing 1^{3}/_{16} miles on dirt when he won the 1973 Brooklyn Handicap (Grade 1) at Aqueduct Racetrack in Queens, New York with a time of 1:52^{2}/_{5}, which was equaled only by Farma Way at Pimlico Race Course in 1991. Their record still stands as of April 2026.

Stakes record: (at current distance of 1 1/2 miles)

- 2:26.00 – Nasty and Bold (1978)
- 2:26.00 – Hechizado (1981)

Most wins:

- 3 – Discovery (1934, 1935, 1936)
- 3 – Forego (1974, 1975, 1976)

Most wins by a jockey:

- 6 – Eddie Arcaro (1944, 1947, 1954, 1955, 1956, 1961)

Most wins by a trainer:

- 7 – Sam Hildreth (1909, 1910, 1916, 1921, 1923, 1925)

Most wins by an owner:

- 5 – James R. Keene (1895, 1901, 1905, 1907, 1908)
- 5 – Greentree Stable (1943, 1944, 1953, 1958, 1963)

== Winners ==
Year	Winner	Age	Jockey	Trainer	Owner	Dist. (Miles)	Time	Win$
2025	Not run							
2024	Next	6	Luan Machado	William Cowans	Michael A. Foster	13/8 M	2:13.68	$200,000
2023	Next	5	Luan Machado	William Cowans	Michael A. Foster	11/2 M	2:31.01	$250,000
2022	Fearless	6	Luis Saez	Todd Pletcher	Repole Stable	11/2 M	2:30.45	$220,000
2021	Lone Rock	6	Ramon Vazquez	Robertino Diodoro	Flying P Stable	11/2 M	2:28.97	$220,000
2019	Marconi	4	Jose Lezcano	Todd Pletcher	Bridlewood Farm, Susan Magnier, Derrick Smith, Michael Tabor	11/2 M	2:28.97	$220,000
2018	Hoppertunity	7	Flavien Prat	Bob Baffert	Karl Watson, M. E. Pegram, Paul Weitman	11/2 M	2:28.61	$220,000
2017	War Story	5	Javier Castellano	Jorge Navarro	Loooch Racing Stables, Glenn K. Ellis, Imaginary Stables	11/2 M	2:31.02	$220,000
2016	Shaman Ghost	4	Joel Rosario	James Jerkens	Stronach Stables	11/2 M	2:28.40	$220,000
2015	Coach Inge	4	John Velazquez	Todd Pletcher	Repole Stable	11/2 M	2:27.17	$220,000
2014	Norumbega	4	Joel Rosario	Claude R. McGaughey III	Stuart S. Janney III	11/2 M	2:27.13	$220,000
2013	Calidoscopio	10	Aaron Gryder	Mike Puype	Dona Pancha	11/2 M	2:31.64	$275,000
2012	Redeemed	4	Ramon Domínguez	Richard E. Dutrow Jr.	Jay Em Ess Stable	11/2 M	2:28.89	$120,000
2011	Birdrun	5	Rajiv Maragh	Bill Mott	Preston Stables (Jack, Art, & J. R. Preston)	11/2 M	2:28.24	$90,000
2010	Alcomo	7	Cornelio Velásquez	Eduardo Caramori	Abdul Rahman Al Jasmi	11/2 M	2:30.07	$90,000
2009	Eldaafer	4	Jorge Chavez	Diane Alvarado	Alghuwayriyah Stable	11/2 M	2:31.58	$120,000
2008	Delosvientos	5	Eibar Coa	Giuseppe Iadisernia	Giuseppe Iadisernia	11/2 M	2:30.96	$120,000
2007	Any Given Saturday	3	Garrett Gomez	Todd Pletcher	WinStar Farm & Padua Stables	11/8 M	1:48.31	$94,320
2006	Wanderin Boy	4	Javier Castellano	Nick Zito	Arthur Hancock III	11/8 M	1:47.94	$95,700
2005	Limehouse	4	John Velazquez	Todd Pletcher	Dogwood Stable	11/8 M	1:46.69	$150,000
2004	Seattle Fitz	5	Richard Migliore	Kiaran McLaughlin	West Point Stable (Terry Finley syndicate)	11/8 M	1:46.20	$150,000
2003	Iron Deputy	4	Richard Migliore	James Jerkens	Susan & John Moore	11/8 M	1:47.80	$150,000
2002	Seeking Daylight	4	Edgar Prado	Mark A. Hennig	Edward P. Evans	11/8 M	1:46.20	$150,000
2001	Albert the Great	4	Jorge Chavez	Nicholas Zito	Tracy Farmer	11/8 M	1:47.40	$150,000
2000	Lemon Drop Kid	4	Edgar Prado	Scotty Schulhofer	Jeanne G. Vance	11/8 M	1:49.80	$150,000
1999	Running Stag	5	Shane Sellers	Philip Mitchell	Richard J. Cohen	11/8 M	1:46.20	$210,000
1998	Subordination	4	Eibar Coa	Gary Sciacca	Klaravich Stables (Seth Klarman & Jeff Ravich)	11/8 M	1:46.60	$180,000
1997	Formal Gold	4	Jerry D. Bailey	William Perry	John D. Murphy	11/8 M	1:46.20	$180,000
1996	Wekiva Springs	5	Mike E. Smith	William I. Mott	Donald R. Dizney & James English	11/8 M	1:46.60	$180,000
1995	You And I	4	Jorge Chavez	Robert J. Frankel	Edmund A. Gann	11/8 M	1:49.00	$150,000
1994	Devil His Due	5	Mike E. Smith	H. Allen Jerkens	Lion Crest Stable (Edith Libutti)	11/8 M	1:46.60	$150,000
1993	Living Vicariously	3	Robbie Davis	Claude R. McGaughey III	Ogden Mills Phipps	13/8 M	2:17.80	$150,000
1992	Chief Honcho	5	Randy Romero	William I. Mott	Matthew K. Firestone	13/8 M	2:16.80	$210,000
1991	Timely Warning	6	Mike Luzzi	Virgil W. Raines	Anderson Fowler	13/8 M	2:14.00	$210,000
1990	Montubio	5	Jacinto Vásquez	Angel Penna Jr.	Dogwood Stable	11/2 M	2:28.60	$241,920
1989	Forever Silver	4	Jacinto Vásquez	Stanley R. Shapoff	Chevalier Stable (Stanley R. Shapoff)	11/2 M	2:28.60	$238,560
1988	Waquoit	6	José A. Santos	Guido Federico	Joseph Federico	11/2 M	2:28.80	$229,740
1987	Waquoit	5	Chris McCarron	Guido Federico	Joseph Federico	11/2 M	2:28.40	$249,480
1986	Little Missouri	4	Jean-Luc Samyn	George R. Arnold II	Loblolly Stable	11/2 M	2:26.40	$168,900
1985	Bounding Basque	5	Antonio Graell	Woody Sedlacek	Jacques Wimpfheimer	11/2 M	2:28.40	$207,300
1984	Fit to Fight	5	Jerry D. Bailey	MacKenzie Miller	Rokeby Stables	11/2 M	2:27.40	$174,000
1983	Highland Blade	5	Jacinto Vásquez	David A. Whiteley	Pen-Y-Bryn Farm	11/2 M	2:31.00	$172,800
1982	Silver Supreme	5	Ángel Cordero Jr.	Richard DeStasio	Michael Berry	11/2 M	2:29.40	$131,700
1981	Hechizado	5	Ruben Hernandez	H. Allen Jerkens	Charles Schmidt Jr.	11/2 M	2:26.00	$138,300
1980	Winter's Tale	4	Jeffrey Fell	MacKenzie Miller	Rokeby Stables	11/2 M	2:28.60	$130,200
1979	The Liberal Member	4	Ramon Encinas	Angel Penna Sr.	Ogden Phipps	11/2 M	2:28.80	$99,000
1978	Nasty And Bold	3	Jean-Luc Samyn	Philip G. Johnson	Meadow Hill Lane Farm	11/2 M	2:26.00	$63,900
1977	Great Contractor	4	Ángel Cordero Jr.	Roger Laurin	Howard Wilson	11/2 M	2:26.20	$66,600
1976	Forego	6	Heliodoro Gustines	Frank Y. Whiteley Jr.	Lazy F Ranch	11/4 M	2:01.20	$67,860
1975	Forego	5	Heliodoro Gustines	Sherrill W. Ward	Lazy F Ranch	11/4 M	1:59.80	$66,780
1974	Forego	4	Heliodoro Gustines	Sherrill W. Ward	Lazy F Ranch	13/16 M	1:54.80	$66,600
1973	Riva Ridge	4	Ron Turcotte	Lucien Laurin	Meadow Stable	13/16 M	1:52.40	$67,200
1972	Key To The Mint	3	Braulio Baeza	J. Elliott Burch	Rokeby Stables	13/16 M	1:54.80	$70,860
1971	Never Bow	5	Bobby Ussery	Pancho Martin	Sigmund Sommer	11/4 M	2:03.60	$69,060
1970	Dewan	5	Laffit Pincay Jr.	James W. Maloney	William Haggin Perry	11/4 M	2:02.80	$69,810
1969	Nodouble	4	Eddie Belmonte	J. Bert Sonnier	Verna Lea Farm	11/4 M	2:00.40	$70,850
1968	Damascus	4	Manuel Ycaza	Frank Y. Whiteley Jr.	Edith W. Bancroft	11/4 M	1:59.20	$71,110
1967	Handsome Boy	4	Eddie Belmonte	H. Allen Jerkens	Hobeau Farm	11/4 M	2:00.20	$69,355
1966	Buckpasser	3	Braulio Baeza	Edward A. Neloy	Ogden Phipps	11/4 M	2:01.80	$69,615
1965	Pia Star	4	John Sellers	Clyde Troutt	Ada L. Rice	11/4 M	2:00.60	$69,680
1964	Gun Bow	4	Walter Blum	Edward A. Neloy	Gedney Farms (Harry Albert & Mrs. John Stanley)	11/4 M	1:59.60	$71,500
1963	Cyrano	4	Bobby Ussery	John M. Gaver Sr.	Greentree Stable	11/4 M	2:01.60	$72,800
1962	Beau Purple	5	William Boland	H. Allen Jerkens	Hobeau Farm	11/4 M	2:00.00	$71,240
1961	Kelso	4	Eddie Arcaro	Carl Hanford	Bohemia Stable	11/4 M	2:01.60	$73,320
1960	On-and-On	4	Ismael Valenzuela	Horace A. Jones	Calumet Farm	11/4 M	2:03.00	$70,010
1959	Babu	5	Conn McCreary	Jack Weipert	W. Cal Partee	13/16 M	1:56.40	$72,545
1958	Cohoes	4	John Ruane	John M. Gaver Sr.	Greentree Stable	13/16 M	1:55.60	$36,450
1957	Portersville	4	Eldon Nelson	Anthony J. Pupino	Clearwater Stable (F.L. Leatherbury & E.A. Roberts)	13/16 M	1:55.20	$37,700
1956	Dedicate	4	Eddie Arcaro	G. Carey Winfrey	Mrs. Jan Burke	13/16 M	1:55.80	$37,600
1955	High Gun	4	Eddie Arcaro	Max Hirsch	King Ranch	11/4 M	2:03.00	$37,900
1954	Invigorator	4	Eddie Arcaro	Edward A. Neloy	Saxon Stables	11/4 M	2:04.40	$40,500
1953	Tom Fool	4	Ted Atkinson	John M. Gaver Sr.	Greentree Stable	11/4 M	2:04.40	$37,900
1952	Crafty Admiral	4	Eric Guerin	Robert B. Odom	Charfran Stable (Charles & Frances Cohen)	11/4 M	2:01.80	$41,700
1951	Palestinian	5	Sam Boulmetis Sr.	Hirsch Jacobs	Isidor Bieber	11/4 M	2:03.80	$39,000
1950	My Request	5	Ted Atkinson	James P. Conway	Ben F. Whitaker	11/4 M	2:03.00	$41,000
1949	Assault	6	Dave Gorman	Max Hirsch	King Ranch	11/4 M	2:02.80	$40,600
1948	Conniver	4	Ted Atkinson	William Post	Harry La Montague	11/4 M	2:05.80	$39,300
1947	Assault	4	Eddie Arcaro	Max Hirsch	King Ranch	11/4 M	2:03.60	$38,100
1946	Gallorette	4	Job Dean Jessop	Edward A. Christmas	William L. Brann	11/4 M	2:05.00	$41,100
1945	Stymie	4	Robert Permane	Max Hirsch	Ethel D. Jacobs	11/4 M	2:02.20	$39,120
1944	Four Freedoms	4	Eddie Arcaro	John M. Gaver Sr.	Greentree Stable	11/4 M	2:02.80	$39,720
1943	Devil Diver	4	Steve Brooks	John M. Gaver Sr.	Greentree Stable	11/4 M	2:03.40	$23,200
1942	Whirlaway	4	George Woolf	Ben A. Jones	Calumet Farm	11/4 M	2:02.40	$23,650
1941	Fenelon	4	James Stout	James Fitzsimmons	Belair Stud	11/4 M	2:03.60	$19,250
1940	Isolater	7	James Stout	James Fitzsimmons	Belair Stud	11/4 M	2:03.00	$16,900
1939	Cravat	4	Basil James	Walter Burrows	Townsend B. Martin	11/8 M	1:48.20	$18,250
1938	The Chief	3	Johnny Longden	Earl Sande	Maxwell Howard	11/8 M	1:48.40	$18,450
1937	Seabiscuit	4	Red Pollard	Tom Smith	Charles S. Howard	11/8 M	1:50.20	$18,025
1936	Discovery	5	Leo Fallon	Bud Stotler	Alfred G. Vanderbilt Jr.	11/8 M	1:50.00	$10,575
1935	Discovery	4	John Bejshak	Bud Stotler	Alfred G. Vanderbilt Jr.	11/8 M	1:48.20	$10,200
1934	Discovery	3	John Bejshak	Bud Stotler	Alfred G. Vanderbilt Jr.	11/8 M	1:49.80	$2,925
1933	Dark Secret	4	Hank Mills	James Fitzsimmons	Wheatley Stable	11/8 M	1:51.20	$3,380
1932	Blenheim III	4	Hank Mills	James Fitzsimmons	Wheatley Stable	11/8 M	1:51.20	$9,800
1931	Questionnaire	4	Raymond Workman	Andy Schuttinger	James Butler	11/8 M	1:49.00	$13,900
1930	Sortie	5	Pete Walls	Max Hirsch	A. Charles Schwartz	11/8 M	1:49.80	$10,800
1929	Light Carbine	6	Georgie Rose	Michael J. Dunleavy	Ira B. Humphreys	11/8 M	1:50.60	$14,300
1928	Black Panther	4	John Maiben	Thomas J. Healey	Walter J. Salmon Sr.	11/8 M	1:51.20	$13,750
1927	Peanuts	5	Harold Thurber	George P. Odom	Aknusti Stable	11/8 M	1:48.80	$13,150
1926	Single Foot	4	Clarence Turner	Harry Rites	J. Edwin Griffith	11/8 M	1:50.40	$11,950
1925	Mad Play	4	Laverne Fator	Sam Hildreth	Rancocas Stable	11/8 M	1:50.00	$7,600
1924	Hephaistos	5	John Maiben	Frank E. Brown	Frank E. Brown	11/8 M	1:50.80	$7,600
1923	Little Chief	4	Earl Sande	Sam Hildreth	Rancocas Stable	11/8 M	1:50.00	$7,600
1922	Exterminator	7	Albert Johnson	Henry McDaniel	Willis Sharpe Kilmer	11/8 M	1:50.00	$7,600
1921	Grey Lag	3	Laverne Fator	Sam Hildreth	Rancocas Stable	11/8 M	1:49.80	$7,600
1920	Cirrus	4	Lavelle Ensor	Sam Hildreth	Sam Hildreth	11/8 M	1:50.00	$5,850
1919	Eternal	3	Andy Schuttinger	Kimball Patterson	James W. McClelland	11/8 M	1:49.80	$4,850
1918	Cudgel	4	Lawrence Lyke	H. Guy Bedwell	J. K. L. Ross	11/8 M	1:50.20	$4,850
1917	Borrow	9	Willie Knapp	James G. Rowe Sr.	Harry P. Whitney	11/8 M	1:49.40	$4,850
1916	Friar Rock	3	Everett Haynes	Sam Hildreth	August Belmont Jr.	11/8 M	1:50.00	$3,850
1915	Tartar	5	John McTaggart	Thomas J. Healey	Richard T. Wilson Jr.	11/8 M	1:50.60	$3,850
1914	Buckhorn	5	Joe McCahey	Jack D. Adkins	Roderick J. Mackenzie	11/4 M	2:08.00	$3,350
1913	Whisk Broom II	6	Joe Notter	James G. Rowe Sr.	Harry P. Whitney	11/4 M	2:03.40	$3,125
1912	No races held due to the Hart–Agnew Law.							
1911	No races held due to the Hart–Agnew Law.							
1910	Fitz Herbert	4	Eddie Dugan	Sam Hildreth	Sam Hildreth	11/4 M	2:05.60	$4,800
1909	King James	4	Eddie Dugan	Sam Hildreth	Sam Hildreth	11/4 M	2:04.00	$3,850
1908	Celt	3	Joe Notter	James G. Rowe Sr.	James R. Keene	11/4 M	2:04.20	$19,750
1907	Superman	3	Walter Miller	James G. Rowe Sr.	James R. Keene	11/4 M	2:05.60	$15,800
1906	Tokalon	5	Richard Bedell	J. W. Fuller	J. W. Fuller	11/4 M	2:05.60	$15,800
1905	Delhi	4	Tommy Burns	James G. Rowe Sr.	James R. Keene	11/4 M	2:06.40	$15,800
1904	The Picket	4	Oscar Helgesen	Carroll B. Reid	Waldeck Stable (John Middleton & Carl Jungbluth)	11/4 M	2:06.60	$15,800
1903	Irish Lad	3	Frank O'Neill	John W. Rogers	Westbury Stable	11/4 M	2:05.40	$14,950
1902	Reina	4	Winfield O'Connor	Julius Bauer	Arthur Featherstone	11/4 M	2:07.00	$7,800
1901	Conroy	3	Winfield O'Connor	James G. Rowe Sr.	James & Foxhall Keene	11/4 M	2:09.00	7,800
1900	Kinley Mack	4	Patrick McCue	Peter Wimmer	Augustus Eastin & Samuel E. Larabie	11/4 M	2:10.00	$7,800
1899	Banastar	4	Danny Maher	Matthew M. Allen	William H. Clark	11/4 M	2:06.25	$7,800
1898	Ornament	4	Tod Sloan	Charles T. Patterson	Hal Price Headley & W. P. Norton	11/4 M	2:10.00	$7,800
1897	Howard Mann	4	Skeets Martin	William C. Smith	George E. Smith	11/4 M	2:09.75	$7,750
1896	Sir Walter	6	Fred Taral	Walter C. Rollins	Oneck Stable	11/4 M	2:08.50	$7,750
1895	Hornpipe	4	Anthony Hamilton	William Lakeland	James & Foxhall Keene	11/4 M	2:11.25	$7,750
1894	Dr. Rice	4	Fred Taral	Fred Foster	Fred Foster	11/4 M	2:07.25	$17,750
1893	Diablo	7	Fred Taral	John S. Campbell	Alfred F. Walcott & John S. Campbell	11/4 M	2:09.00	$17,750
1892	Judge Morrow	5	Alexander Covington	Green B. Morris	Green B. Morris	11/4 M	2:08.75	$17,750
1891	Tenny	5	Shelby Barnes	P. S. Donovan	David T. Pulsifer	11/4 M	2:10.00	$14,800
1890	Castaway II	4	W. Bunn	John Campbell	Beverwyck Stable	11/4 M	2:10.00	$6,900
1889	Exile	7	Anthony Hamilton	William Lakeland	William Lakeland	11/4 M	2:07.50	$6,900
1888	The Bard	5	William Hayward	John Huggins	Alexander Cassatt	11/4 M	2:13.00	$6,925
1887	Dry Monopole	4	Andy McCarthy	Not found	Emery & Co.	11/4 M	2:07.00	$5,850
