= Fit to Fight =

American-bred Thoroughbred racehorse

- Sire: Chieftain
- Grandsire: Bold Ruler
- Dam: Hasty Queen II
- Damsire: One Count
- Sex: Stallion
- Foaled: 1979
- Country: United States
- Colour: Bay
- Breeder: Bob Courtney & Robert Congleton
- Owner: Rokeby Stables
- Trainer: MacKenzie Miller
- Record: 26: 14-3-3
- Earnings: $1,042,075

Major wins
- Jerome Handicap (1982); Stuyvesant Handicap (1983); Metropolitan Handicap (1984); Brooklyn Handicap (1984); Suburban Handicap (1984)

Awards
- 4th New York Handicap Triple winner (1984)
- Last updated on May 30, 2008

Fit to Fight (April 5, 1979 in Kentucky – May 30, 2008) was an American Thoroughbred racehorse who won the Handicap Triple Crown (also called the New York Handicap Triple) in 1984.

== Background ==
Sired by Chieftain, a son of Bold Ruler, in turn a grandson of Nearco, Fit to Fight was out of the mare Hasty Queen II, the 1983 Kentucky Broodmare of the Year. His damsire, One Count, won the 1952 Belmont Stakes and shared U.S. Horse of the Year honors. One Count was a son of the 1943 U.S. triple Crown champion, Count Fleet.

== Racing career ==
Racing at age three, Fit to Fight won his first major graded stakes race, the 1982 Jerome Handicap. The following year he was second to A Phenomenon in the Vosburgh Stakes but ahead of third-place finisher, Deputy Minister. In the Tom Fool Stakes, Fit to Fight took another second but this time to winner Deputy Minister then the two horses reversed their finishes with Fit to Fight capturing the Stuyvesant Handicap.

In 1984, Fit to Fight had his best year. Ridden by Jerry Bailey, the five-year-old became only the fourth horse in history to win the Handicap Triple Crown (also called the New York Handicap Triple), joining U.S. Racing Hall of Famers, Whisk Broom II (1913), Tom Fool (1953), and Kelso (1961). Fit to Fight finished behind winner Slew o' Gold in the voting for 1984's Eclipse Award for Outstanding Older Male Horse.

== Stud career ==
Retired from racing, in 1985 Fit to Fight became one of the original stallions to stand at stud at Lane's End Farm in Versailles, Kentucky. The sire of 39 Stake race winners, he was pensioned in 2005 and sent to retirement at Blue Ridge Farm in Middleburg, Virginia. On May 30, 2008, at the age of 29, he was euthanized due to the infirmities of old age.
