= Highland Blade =

American-bred Thoroughbred racehorse

- Sire: Damascus
- Grandsire: Sword Dancer
- Dam: Misty Bryn
- Damsire: Misty Flight
- Sex: Stallion
- Foaled: 1978
- Country: United States
- Colour: Dark bay
- Breeder: Pen-Y-Bryn Farm
- Owner: Pen-Y-Bryn Farm
- Trainer: David A. Whiteley
- Record: 29: 12-3-3
- Earnings: US$998,888

Major wins
- Everglades Stakes (1981); Golden Grass Stakes (1981); Red Smith Handicap (1982); Brooklyn Handicap (1983); Marlboro Cup Handicap (1983); Pan American Handicap (1983)

Highland Blade (April 26, 1978 – November 4, 1997) was an American Thoroughbred racehorse who won Grade I stakes on both dirt and turf, taking the Brooklyn, Marlboro Cup Invitational, and Pan American Handicaps. He was owned by Pen-Y-Bryn Farm, a partnership founded in 1971 by brothers William W. and Thomas M. Bancroft Jr. of Muttontown, New York. They were sons of Edith Woodward Bancroft, who owned Highland Blade's sire, U.S. Racing Hall of Fame inductee Damascus, and their maternal grandfather was William Woodward Sr., who owned the famous Belair Stud.

Trained by David Whiteley, as a three-year-old Highland Blade ran second by a neck to Summing in the Belmont Stakes, the third leg of the Triple Crown series. In winning the 1983 Marlboro Cup Invitational Handicap under jockey Jacinto Vásquez, he defeated U.S. Racing Hall of Fame inductee Slew o' Gold, Kentucky Derby winner Gato Del Sol, and Preakness Stakes winner Deputed Testamony.

== At stud ==
Highland Blade met with good success as a sire. Among his top runners was the multiple stakes winner Highland Penny.
