= Devil His Due =

American-bred Thoroughbred racehorse

- Sire: Devil's Bag
- Grandsire: Halo
- Dam: Plenty O'Toole
- Damsire: Raise a Cup
- Sex: Stallion
- Foaled: April 18, 1989
- Died: May 22, 2017 (aged 28)
- Country: United States
- Colour: Black
- Breeder: Peter E. Blum
- Owner: Blue Ribbon Farm
- Trainer: H. Allen Jerkens
- Record: 41: 11-12-3
- Earnings: US$3,920,405

Major wins
- Pimlico Special Handicap(1993); Wood Memorial Stakes (1992); Gotham Stakes (1992); Gulfstream Park Handicap (1993); Suburban Handicap (1993 & 1994); Excelsior Handicap (1993); Brooklyn Handicap (1994); Broward Handicap (1994)

Devil His Due (April 18, 1989 – May 22, 2017) was a multimillionaire American Thoroughbred racehorse and successful sire. Bred in Kentucky by Peter E. Blum and raced under the Blue Ribbon Farm banner, he had a record of 41: 11-12-3 with career earnings of $3,920,405. At the time of his retirement, he was fourth on the all-time career earnings list. Devil His Due was best known for his three races in the grade one Pimlico Special (1 win and 2 seconds) and his two wins in the grade one Suburban Handicap. He was registered as a dark bay colt; but was later classified as a "true black."

== Three-year-old season ==
Devil His Due was a late-developing colt and did not race as a two-year-old. As a three-year-old, he started in 15 races. His marquee wins both came at Aqueduct Racetrack when he won both of New York's top Triple Crown prep races. Devil His Due won the $500,000 Grade I Wood Memorial Stakes at nine furlongs on the dirt. Prior to the Wood win, he finished in a dead heat with Lure in the $250,000 Grade II Gotham Stakes.

He also finished eleventh in the Kentucky Derby way behind winner Lil E. Tee. Later that summer, he placed third in the Grade II Jim Dandy Stakes at Saratoga Race Course as a prep race for the $1,000,000 Grade I Travers Stakes. In that race, Devil His Due ran second to Thunder Rumble. He finished the year with a record of (15): 4-2-1 and earnings of $688,365.

== Four-year-old season ==
At age four, Devil His Due posted perhaps the best year of his career when he raced eleven times and won three Grade I and one Grade II stake races. His record was four wins, two seconds, and two thirds in eleven races for earnings of $1,939,120.

In the Pimlico Special, he was a slight favorite at 1.3 to 1 over the prior year's Derby winner, Strike the Gold, at 1.7 to 1. That year, the country's top racetracks, owners, and breeders established a series of seven handicap races for older horses to showcase the industry's top division and called it the American Championship Racing Series or A.C.R.S. The Pimlico Special was the capstone of that series. As they broke from the gate and passed the stands for the first time, Ibex took the lead by a length over Pistols and Roses while Devil His Due trailed two lengths behind him. Jockey Herb McCauley kept Devil His Due in a stalking position of third throughout the first mile. On the far turn, Valley Crossings passed everyone to lead. Devil His Due and Pistols and Roses made a charge at the leader, but only the former got by. Devil His Due finished the race in 1:55.2 on a track listed as fast. Valley Crossing finished second, and Pistols and Roses finished third. Derby winner Strike the Gold was never a factor and finished sixth. That win in the Grade I $600,000 Special was the largest of Devil His Due's career. He received a $150,000 bonus for winning the ACRS series (after four races).

Devil His Due also won the $400,000 Grade I Gulfstream Park Handicap at ten furlongs at Gulfstream Park and the $300,000 Grade I Suburban Handicap at Belmont Park that year. In other races at age four, he won the Grade II Excelsior Handicap, was second in the Grade I Woodward Stakes, finished second in the Grade I Philip H. Iselin Handicap, and ran third in the Grade I Whitney Handicap.

== Five-year-old season ==
Devil His Due won three graded stakes races, placed in six more, and showed in another in twelve races for annual earnings of $1,142,000. At age five, he repeated his win in the prestigious grade one Suburban Handicap and won the grade two Brooklyn Handicap, both at Belmont Park. He also won the grade three Broward Handicap at Gulfstream Park in 1994. His runner-up placings were seconds in the grade one Jockey Club Gold Cup, the grade one Oaklawn Handicap, the grade one Pimlico Special, the grade one Woodward Stakes, the grade one Whitney Handicap, and the grade one NYRA Mile Handicap. In addition, he was third in the grade one Metropolitan Handicap.

== Six-year-old season ==
As a six-year-old, Devil His Due was in the twilight of his career and raced only three times between February and May 1995. In his last year of racing, he placed second in the $110,000 Grade III Westchester Handicap at Aqueduct Racetrack. In his next start, he finished off the board. His trainer and owner then ran him against that decade's super horse, Cigar, in the Pimlico Special. Cigar won by two and 1/4 lengths. Devil His Due earned $120,000 for his second-place performance. In the process, he set a career earnings record that still stands for "Special" runners at $900,000. One of Devil His Due's claims to fame is that in an era of vast Lasix use, he ran Lasix-free in 41 starts for a total of over 44 miles of racing.

== Retirement ==
Devil His Due stood at Margaux Farm, LLC in Midway, Kentucky. As a sire, he was considered a success, as his progeny earned over $35 million. Some of his prominent offspring included: grade one winner Roses in May who earned $5,480,187; graded stakes winner Spite The Devil with earnings of $849,512; grade two-winning filly She's a Devil Due with earnings of $533,820; Devil Time with earnings of $490,351; Hostility with earnings of $401,829; and in 2008, multiple stakes winner Stop a Train with earnings of $482,084. He was pensioned following the 2013 season.

== Death ==
Devil His Due was euthanized on May 22, 2017, due to the infirmities of old age, at the age of 28.
