= James H. McCormick =

American academic administrator

3rd Chancellor of the Minnesota State Colleges and Universities system
- In office July 1, 2001 – July 31, 2011
- Preceded by: Morris Anderson
- Succeeded by: Steven Rosenstone

1st Chancellor of the Pennsylvania State System of Higher Education
- In office July 1, 1983 – June 30, 2001
- Preceded by: Office established
- Succeeded by: Judy Hample

4th President of Bloomsburg University of Pennsylvania
- In office 1973–1983
- Preceded by: Robert Nossen
- Succeeded by: Larry Jones

Personal details
- Born: James Harold McCormick; November 11, 1938 (age 88) Indiana, Pennsylvania, U.S.
- Spouse: Maryan Kough Garner
- Children: 2, including Dave
- Education: Indiana University of Pennsylvania (BA); University of Pittsburgh (MEd, EdD)
- Scientific career
- Fields: Education; Psychology
- Workplaces: Shippensburg University of Pennsylvania; Bloomsburg University of Pennsylvania
- Thesis: Differences in the Relationship Between Achievement and Selected Measures of Aptitude Under Programmed and Non-Programmed Instruction. (1963)

James Harold McCormick (born November 11, 1938) is an American academic administrator who was most recently chancellor of the Minnesota State Colleges and Universities system from 2001 to 2011. He was previously the first chancellor of the Pennsylvania State System of Higher Education for eighteen years. His son, Dave McCormick, is an incumbent United States Senator from Pennsylvania.

== Early life and education ==
McCormick was born in 1938 to Harold Clark and Mary Blanche Truby McCormick. He earned a bachelor's degree from Indiana University of Pennsylvania in 1959. He completed a master's degree in curriculum and administration and a D.Ed. in educational administration from the University of Pittsburgh School of Education. His 1963 dissertation was titled, Differences in the Relationship Between Achievement and Selected Measures of Aptitude Under Programmed and Non-Programmed Instruction.

== Career ==
In 1965, McCormick became part of the faculty at Shippensburg State College, starting as an associate professor in the Department of Education and Psychology. Over the years, he took on various roles within the institution, including assistant dean of academic affairs, acting dean of teacher education, assistant to the president, and vice president for administration. He actively participated in the faculty senate and played a significant role in negotiating the initial faculty contract in from 1971 to 1972 as one of the two vice-presidents on the commonwealth team.

In 1973, McCormick became the president of Bloomsburg State College, succeeding Robert Nossen. He served in the role until 1983. He was later the first chancellor of the Pennsylvania State System of Higher Education for eighteen years. From July 1, 2001, to July 31, 2011, McCormick was the chancellor of the Minnesota State Colleges and Universities system.

== Personal life ==
McCormick married Maryan Kough Garner, a college professor. They are the parents of two children, Douglas Paul and businessman and U.S. Senator Dr. Dave McCormick.
