= Pia Star =

American-bred Thoroughbred racehorse

- Sire: Olympia
- Grandsire: Heliopolis
- Dam: Inquisitive
- Damsire: Mahmoud
- Sex: Stallion
- Foaled: 1961
- Country: United States
- Colour: Bay
- Breeder: Danada Farm
- Owner: Ada L. Rice
- Trainer: Clyde Troutt
- Record: 29: 10-1-4
- Earnings: US$306,240

Major wins
- Brooklyn Handicap (1965); Equipoise Mile Handicap (1965); Suburban Handicap (1965); Widener Handicap (1966)

Pia Star (1961–1978) was an American Thoroughbred racehorse who equaled a world record for one mile on dirt in winning the 1965 Equipoise Mile Handicap at Arlington Park in Chicago. In addition, he won the 1965 Brooklyn and Suburban Handicaps and in 1966, the Widener Handicap at Hialeah Park Race Track in Florida.

He was bred by and raced by Ada L. Rice and trained by Clyde Troutt. When his racing days were over, Pia Star was retired to stud. Among others winners, he sired San Antonio Handicap winner Poley and was the damsire of Mom's Command and of Star of Cozzene.
