= New York Handicap Triple =

The Handicap Triple Crown or New York Handicap Triple are the names used to refer to three American handicap races for older Thoroughbred racehorses run by the New York Racing Association at Belmont Park in Elmont, New York. The three races are (in order):

- Metropolitan Handicap
- Suburban Handicap
- Brooklyn Handicap (now the Brooklyn Invitational Stakes)

Since 2008, the Brooklyn Handicap and Metropolitan Handicap have both been run on Belmont Stakes day, making it impossible for a horse to win all 3 races.

Four horses have won the Handicap Triple Crown:

- Whisk Broom II (1913)
- Tom Fool (1953)
- Kelso (1961)
- Fit to Fight (1984)
