= United Nations Stakes top three finishers =

American horse race winners

This is a listing of the horses that finished in either first, second, or third place and the number of starters in the United Nations Stakes, an American Grade 1 race for three-year-olds at 1-1/8 miles on the turf held at Monmouth Park Racetrack in Oceanport, New Jersey. (List 1973-present)

Year	Winner	Second	Third	Starters
1973	Tentam	Star Envoy	Return to Reality	12
1974	Halo	London Company	Scantling	10
1975	Royal Glint	Stonewalk	R. Tom Can	9
1976	Intrepid Hero	Improviser	Break Up the Game	8
1977	Bemo	Quick Card	Alias Smith	5
1978	Noble Dancer	Upper Nile	Dan Horn	5
1979	Noble Dancer	Dom Alaric	Overskate	6
1980	Lyphard's Wish	Match the Hatch	Scythian Gold	9
1981	Key To Content	Ben Fab	Quality T. V.	9
1982	Naskra's Breeze	Acaroid	Don Roberto	10
1983	Acaroid	Trevita	Majesty's Prince	13
1984	Hero's Honor	Cozzene	Who's for Dinner	11
1985	Ends Well	Who's for Dinner	Cool	11
1986	Manila	Uptown Swell	Lieutenant's Lark	8
1987	Manila	Racing Star	Air Display	5
1988	Equalize	Wanderkin	Bet Twice	9
1989	Yankee Affair	Salem Drive	Simply Majestic	5
1990	Steinlen	Capades	Alwuhush	8
1991	Exbourne	Forty Niner Days	Goofalik	7
1992	Sky Classic	Chenin Blanc	Lotus Pool	9
1993	Star of Cozzene	Lure	Finder's Choice	7
1994	Lure	Fourstars Allstar	Star of Cozzene	5
1995	Sandpit	Celtic Arms	Alice Springs	9
1996	Sandpit	Diplomatic Jet	Northern Spur	8
1997	Influent	Geri	Flag Down	4
1998	no race	no race	no race	0
1999	Yagli	Supreme Sound	Amerique	6
2000	Down the Aisle	Aly's Alley	Honor Glide	7
2001	Senure	With Anticipation	Gritty Sandie	8
2002	With Anticipation	Denon	Sarafan	7
2003	Balto Star	The Tin Man	Lunar Sovereign	7
2004	Request for Parole	Mr. O'Brien	Nothing to Lose	11
2005	Better Talk Now	Silverfoot	Request for Parole	9
2006	English Channel	Cacique	Relaxed Gesture	7
2007	English Channel	Honey Ryder	Better Talk Now	5
2008	Presious Passion	Strike a Deal	Equitable	8
2009	Presious Passion	Lauro	Brass Hat	8
2010	Chinchon	Take the Points	Winchester	
2011	Teaks North	Chinchon	Stacelita	
2012	Turbo Compressor	Air Support	Al Khali	7 (?)
2013	Big Blue Kitten	Teak's North	Hangover Kid	8
2014	Main Sequence	Twilight Eclipse	Side Glance	9
