= Fourstars Allstar =

American-bred Thoroughbred racehorse

- Sire: Compliance
- Grandsire: Northern Dancer
- Dam: Broadway Joan
- Damsire: Courtney's Doll
- Sex: Stallion
- Foaled: April 5, 1988
- Country: United States
- Colour: Bay
- Breeder: Richard Bomze
- Owner: Richard Bomze and Philip Dileo
- Trainer: Leo O'Brien
- Record: 59: 14-14-9
- Earnings: $1,596,760

Major wins
- Pilgrim Stakes (1990); Damon Runyon Stakes (1990); Irish 2,000 Guineas (1991); Elkhorn Stakes (1992); Bernard Baruch Handicap (1992, 1995); Saratoga Breeders' Cup Handicap (1993); New Hampshire Sweepstakes Handicap (1993); Fort Marcy Handicap (1995)

Awards
- New York-bred Horse of the Year (1993); New York-bred Champion 3yo Male (1991); New York-bred Champion Older Male (1992, 1993); New York-bred Champion Turf Male (1992, 1993, 1995)

Fourstars Allstar (April 5, 1988 – March 2005) was an American Thoroughbred racehorse and sire, best known for his win in the Irish 2,000 Guineas. As a two-year-old in 1990 he showed promising form by winning the Pilgrim Stakes and the Damon Runyon Stakes as well as finishing second in the Laurel Futurity. In May of the following year he was shipped to Ireland and became the first American-trained horse to win a European Classic with his win in the Irish 2000 Guineas. Although never returned to Europe he was a consistent performer in major American Turf racing over the next four seasons, winning the Elkhorn Stakes, Saratoga Breeders' Cup Handicap, Fort Marcy Handicap, New Hampshire Sweepstakes Handicap and two editions of the Bernard Baruch Handicap.

After his retirement from racing he spent most of his stud career in Ireland where he was best known as a sire of stayers and steeplechasers. He died in England in March 2005 after a stable yard accident.

== Background ==
Fourstars Allstar was a bay horse with a white blaze and a long white sock on his left foreleg bred in New York by his owner Richard Bomze. The colt was trained throughout his racing career by Leo O'Brien.

His sire Compliance was a full-brother to both Try My Best and El Gran Senor but less successful than his siblings and made little impact when racing in Europe before returning to the United States. He was purchased by Bomze from Windfields Farm to stand as a breeding stallion in New York. He first established his reputation by siring Fourstars Allstar's older brother Fourstardave. Broadway Joan, the dam of both Fourstars Allstar and Fourstardave, was an unraced daughter of the minor stakes winner Bold Arian. She was a great-granddaughter of the American broodmare Wise Ally (foaled 1937) who was the female-line ancestor of Alydeed and Amazing Maria.

== Racing career ==
=== 1990: two-year-old season ===
Fourstars Allstar was placed in his first three races before winning a maiden race at Saratoga Race Course on August 24. He was unplaced in minor stakes events in his next two starts and then won an allowance race at Belmont Park on October 7 at Belmont Stakes. Thirteen days later he was stepped up in class and finished second to River Traffic in the Grade III Laurel Futurity at Laurel Park. He moved to Aqueduct Racetrack for his last three races of the season and recorded his first important success in the Grade III Pilgrim Stakes on October 31, and followed up in the Damon Runyon Stakes five days later. On his final start he failed to finish in the New York Stallion Stakes on December 1.

=== 1991: three-year-old season ===
During the winter of 1990/1991 O'Brien, having already decided to aim Fourstars Allstar at the Irish 2000 Guineas, moved the colt to Florida to train on the turf gallop at Tony Everard's Another Episode Farm. Fourstars Allstar began his second season by finishing second in an allowance at Aqueduct in April and then won a similar event at Belmont on May 5, beating the subsequent Grade I winner Solar Splendor. He was then shipped to Ireland to contest the Irish 2000 Guineas on May 18, arriving three days before the race. Although many horses bred in the United States and owned by Americans had won major races in Europe, no horse trained in the United States had won a European classic race. An additional obstacle was that the race was run around a right-handed (clockwise) circuit: all major tracks in the United States are left-handed (counterclockwise). Ridden by the American jockey Mike Smith he started the 9/1 third favorite behind the French-trained colts Lycius and Ganges who had finished second and third in the English 2000 Guineas. The other fancied runners were the undefeated Kalahari Prince (from the Vincent O'Brien stable), Rinka Das (winner of the Cartier Million), the British-trained challenger Mellaby and Star of Gdansk (Tetrarch Stakes). Racing a set of light blue blinkers the American colt broke quickly from the stalls, took an early lead and maintained his advantage into the straight. Star of Gdansk, ridden by Christy Roche moved up on the inside and went to the front approaching the last quarter mile, but Fourstars Allstar rallied strongly, regained the lead in the closing strides and won by a head. The pair pulled well clear of their rivals and there was a gap of six lengths back to Lycius in third place.

After returning to the United States, the colt failed to win in seven subsequent starts that season but ran well in several good races. He finished second in the Lexington Stakes and third in both the Gallant Man Stakes and the Knickerbocker Handicap.

=== 1992: four-year-old season ===
Fourstars Allstar ran 11 times at age four, winning twice with two second-place finishes and a third. He started the year in the Grade II Elkhorn Stakes at Keeneland on April 10, 1992, where he withstood an early duel for the lead to win by a neck over Slew the Slewor. He then ran four more times in quick succession, finishing third in the Turf Classic Stakes at Churchill Downs, second in the Dixie Handicap at Pimlico, fifth in the Early Times Manhattan Handicap at Belmont and fourth in the New Hampshire Sweepstakes Handicap at Rockingham Park.

He was then given a break of nearly two months, returning on August 3 to finish second in an allowance race at Saratoga. He was next entered in the Bernard Baruch Handicap on August 12, where he was expected to race as an entry with his full brother Fourstardave. However, Fourstardave was scratched, leaving Fourstars Allstar the solo favorite in a field of six. He won by half a length over Lotus Pool in a time of 1:46.06 for 1 1/8 miles.

Bomze and O'Brien contemplated a return to Europe, perhaps for the Queen Elizabeth II Stakes at Ascot. However, they ultimately stayed in the United States, racing four more times without success. The best result was a fourth-place finish in the Keeneland Breeders' Cup Stakes.

=== 1993: five-year-old season ===
Fourstars Allstar began his 1993 campaign in May when he ran fifth in the Fort Marcy Handicap at Aqueduct and third in the Red Bank Handicap at Monmouth Park, both races being won by the British import Adam Smith. On June 19, the horse made his second attempt to win the New Hampshire Sweepstakes Handicap at Rockingham. Ridden by José A. Santos he dead-heated for first place with Idle Son but was awarded the outright victory after the Idle Son was disqualified for causing interference in the straight.

After finishing sixth under top weight of 118 pounds in the Firecracker Handicap at Churchill Downs on July 4, Foourstars Allstar was off the track for seven weeks before returning in the Saratoga Breeders' Cup Handicap on August 28. Starting the 9.6/1 outsider in the six-runner field, he took the lead in the stretch and drew away to win by three lengths and a head from Lech and Cleone with the odds-on favorite Furiously in fourth place. After the race Leo O'Brien said "Well, everything went according to plan. I told (jockey José A. Santos) that the horse has one kick, and to wait until the eighth pole and he'll give you what he has".

The horse was stepped up to Grade I level for his two remaining starts as a five-year-old, starting with the Washington D.C. International Stakes on October 23 in which he made no impact and came home last of the eight runners. The Breeders' Cup Mile at Santa Anita Park two weeks later saw a return to form as Fourstars Allstar, starting a 74/1 outsider, was amongst the leaders from the start and kept on well in the straight to take third behind Lure and the French filly Ski Paradise, with Toussaud, Barathea, Bigstone, Paradise Creek, Flawlessly and Wolfhound finishing behind.

=== 1994: six-year-old season ===
In 1996 Fourstars Allstar finished second to Paradise Creek in the Appleton Handicap at Gulfstream Park in January and was then off the course for almost four months before finishing fourth to Adam Smith in the Fort Marcy Handicap in May. Later that month he was matched against the 1993 Kentucky Derby winner Sea Hero in an allowance race at Belmont. He recorded his only win of the season as he "wore down" the Derby winner in the closing stage and won by a neck.

In his eight subsequent races in 1994, Fourstars Allstar failed to win but ran well in several major races. In June he finished third when odds-on favorite for the New Hampshire Sweepstakes Handicap and then produced one of his best performances when he was beaten a nose by Lure in the Caesars International Handicap at Atlantic City Race Course with Star of Cozzene in third. In late summer at Saratoga he finished third to A In Sociology in the Daryl's Joy Handicap and fourth in the West Point Handicap before moving to Belmont in September where he finished second in the Belmont Breeders' Cup Handicap and seventh in the Man o' War Stakes. In October, he finished eighth in the Keeneland Breeder's Cup Stakes and fifth in the Mohawk Handicap at Belmont.

=== 1995: seven-year-old season ===
Fourstars Allstar began his sixth campaign on April 29, 1995, when he made his third attempt to win the Fort Marcy Handicap. Starting the 6.1/1 third choice in the eight-runner field he moved up on the outside to take the lead entering the straight and drew away to win by four lengths from Chief Master and A In Sociology with the favored Inside The Beltway back in sixth. He followed up a month later by winning an allowance race at Belmont by a neck from Bonus Award, to whom he was conceding ten pounds in weight. In July he ran second in the Poker Stakes at Belmont and the Daryl's Joy Stakes at Saratoga, beaten a head by Pride of Summer in the latter race.

On August 11 on rain-softened ground at Saratoga, Fourstars Allstar was one of seven horses to contest the 1995 edition of the Bernard Baruch Handicap, a race he had won as a four-year-old in 1992. Starting the 1.2/1 favorite under top weight of 120 pounds he raced wide for most of the way but took the lead in the closing stages and won by half a length and a head from Turk Passer and Compadre. Leo OBrien commented "I have to admit that I was very worried when it started to rain. This horse doesn't like the turf when it's soft".

In September Fourstars Allstar finished fifth in the Breeders' Cup Handicap at Belmont and third behind the subsequently disqualified Joker in the Cliff Hanger Handicap at Meadowlands. On October 14 he finished second to Pride of Summer in the Mohawk Handiacap before ending his track career with a run in the Breeders' Cup Mile at the same course two weeks later. After taking an early lead he turned into the straight in third place but faded in the closing stages to finish seventh behind Ridgewood Pearl.

== Assessment and honors ==
Fourstars Allstar received seven awards from the New York Thoroughbred Breeders Inc. In 1991 he was named Best 3 Year Old Male and in the following year he was voted Best Older Male and Best Turf Male. In 1993 he again took the Older Male and Turf Male prizes and was also named New York-bred Horse of the Year. He was named Best Turf Male for a third time in 1995.

== Stud career ==
Fourstars Allstar spent most of his stud career in Ireland where he was a breeding stallion for the Coolmore Stud. In 2004 Fourstars Allstar was sold to the Astley Grange Farm Stud and moved to England. In March 2005 he was being treated for a urinary tract infection when he became agitated and fell, sustaining a broken neck. He was immediately euthanised. On learning of the horse's death Leo O'Brien said "He was a terrific, sound, and gentle horse. You couldn't want to be around a nicer horse".

The best of his flat runners was Jardines Lookout, who won the Goodwood Cup in 2002. He sired several good National Hunt horses including Aces Four, Chomba Womba (ten wins including the Ascot Hurdle), A New Story (Glenfarclas Cross Country Chase).

== Pedigree ==
Pedigree of Fourstars Allstar, bay stallion, 1988
Sire Compliance (USA) 1978	Northern Dancer (CAN); 1961	Nearctic	Nearco
Sire Compliance (USA) 1978	Northern Dancer (CAN); 1961	Nearctic	Lady Angela
Sire Compliance (USA) 1978	Northern Dancer (CAN); 1961	Natalma	Native Dancer
Sire Compliance (USA) 1978	Northern Dancer (CAN); 1961	Natalma	Almahmoud
Sire Compliance (USA) 1978	Sex Appeal (USA); 1970	Buckpasser	Tom Fool
Sire Compliance (USA) 1978	Sex Appeal (USA); 1970	Buckpasser	Busanda
Sire Compliance (USA) 1978	Sex Appeal (USA); 1970	Best in Show	Traffic Judge
Sire Compliance (USA) 1978	Sex Appeal (USA); 1970	Best in Show	Stolen Hour
Dam Broadway Joan (USA) 1979	Bold Arian (USA); 1970	Noble Jay	Double Jay
Dam Broadway Joan (USA) 1979	Bold Arian (USA); 1970	Noble Jay	Noble Nurse
Dam Broadway Joan (USA) 1979	Bold Arian (USA); 1970	Riverval	River War
Dam Broadway Joan (USA) 1979	Bold Arian (USA); 1970	Riverval	Shop Val
Dam Broadway Joan (USA) 1979	Courtney's Doll (USA); 1971	Wakefield Tower	Nashua
Dam Broadway Joan (USA) 1979	Courtney's Doll (USA); 1971	Wakefield Tower	Slave
Dam Broadway Joan (USA) 1979	Courtney's Doll (USA); 1971	Rapport	Nirgal
Dam Broadway Joan (USA) 1979	Courtney's Doll (USA); 1971	Rapport	Wise Ally (Family: 9)
