= Zulu Alpha =

American-bred Thoroughbred racehorse

- Sire: Street Cry
- Grandsire: Machiavellian
- Dam: Zori
- Damsire: A.P. Indy
- Sex: Colt
- Foaled: 2013
- Country: USA
- Color: Dark Bay/Brown
- Breeder: Calumet Farm (Brad M. Kelley)
- Owner: Michael M. Hui
- Trainer: John A. Ortiz; Michael J. Maker (2019)
- Record: 34:12-5-5
- Earnings: $2,165,114

Major wins
- Sycamore Stakes (2018); W. L. McKnight Handicap (2019); Mac Diarmida Stakes (2019,2020); Kentucky Cup Turf Stakes (2019); Pegasus World Cup Turf (2020); Elkhorn Stakes (2020)
- Last updated on July 12, 2020

Zulu Alpha (foaled February 8, 2013) is an American Thoroughbred racehorse and the winner of the 2020 Pegasus World Cup Turf.

== Career ==
Zulu Alpha's first race was on October 20, 2015, at Gowran Park Racecourse in County Kilkenny, Ireland where he came in second.

Returning to the United States, he picked up his first win on July 18, 2017, at Indiana Grand Race Course in Shelbyville, Indiana. He won again that month at the same track. His 2017 season ended with a third-place finish in the Prairie Bayou Stakes.

His 2018 season saw him come in third place at the Mervin H. Muniz Jr. Memorial Handicap on March 24. He picked up some wins during the summer in allowance optimal claiming races and earned his biggest victory at that time in the G3 Sycamore Stakes on October 18.

His 2019 season was his breakthrough year. He started off the season with a win in the G3 W. L. McKnight Handicap on January 26. His next race on March 2, 2019, also ended in a victory when he won the G2 Mac Diarmida Stakes. He came in third place in the G2 Elkhorn Stakes on April 20, 2019, and finished second in the G1 United Nations Stakes. He then won his last race of the 2019 season, capturing the G3 Kentucky Cup Turf Stakes.

Zulu Alpha began his 2020 season with his biggest win to date by winning the January 25, 2020 G1 Pegasus World Cup Turf.

In the 2020 World's Best Racehorse Rankings, Zulu Alpha was rated on 118, making him the equal 80th best racehorse in the world.

== Retirement ==
In 2021, Zulu Alpha was retired to Old Friends in Georgetown, Kentucky.

== Pedigree ==
Pedigree of Zulu Alpha (USA), 2015
Sire Street Cry (IRE) 1998	Machiavellian (USA); 1987	Mr. Prospector	Raise a Native
Sire Street Cry (IRE) 1998	Machiavellian (USA); 1987	Mr. Prospector	Gold Digger
Sire Street Cry (IRE) 1998	Machiavellian (USA); 1987	Coup De Folie	Halo
Sire Street Cry (IRE) 1998	Machiavellian (USA); 1987	Coup De Folie	Raise The Standard
Sire Street Cry (IRE) 1998	Helen Street (GB); 1982	Troy	Petingo
Sire Street Cry (IRE) 1998	Helen Street (GB); 1982	Troy	La Milo
Sire Street Cry (IRE) 1998	Helen Street (GB); 1982	Waterway	Riverman
Sire Street Cry (IRE) 1998	Helen Street (GB); 1982	Waterway	Boulevard
Dam Zori (USA) 1998	A.P. Indy (USA); 1989	Seattle Slew	Bold Reasoning
Dam Zori (USA) 1998	A.P. Indy (USA); 1989	Seattle Slew	My Charmer
Dam Zori (USA) 1998	A.P. Indy (USA); 1989	Weekend Surprise	Secretariat
Dam Zori (USA) 1998	A.P. Indy (USA); 1989	Weekend Surprise	Lassie Dear
Dam Zori (USA) 1998	Winglet (USA); 1988	Alydar	Raise A Native
Dam Zori (USA) 1998	Winglet (USA); 1988	Alydar	Sweet Tooth
Dam Zori (USA) 1998	Winglet (USA); 1988	Highest Trump	Bold Bidder
Dam Zori (USA) 1998	Winglet (USA); 1988	Highest Trump	Dear April
