= Aces Four =

Irish-bred Thoroughbred racehorse

- Sire: Fourstars Allstar
- Grandsire: Compliance
- Dam: Special Trix
- Damsire: Peacock
- Sex: Gelding
- Foaled: 30 March 1999
- Country: Ireland
- Colour: Chestnut
- Breeder: J.R. Cox
- Owner: The DPRP Aces Partnership
- Trainer: Ferdy Murphy
- Record: 20: 6-4-3
- Earnings: £89,190

Major wins
- Mildmay Novices' Chase

Aces Four, foaled on 30 March 1999 in Ireland, is an Irish Thoroughbred racehorse.

== Background ==
Aces Four was sired by Fourstars Allstar out of the mare Special Trix. He was owned by the DPRP Aces Partnership, trained by Ferdy Murphy, and his primary jockey was Graham Lee.

== Racing career ==
Aces Four started racing as a four-year-old in January 2004. In his early years, he was trained by Billy McKeown. In 2005, Ferdy Murphy took over duties and trained Aces Four to six wins in their first 10 races together. He won his first race, the Lugg Maiden Hurdle in February 2006 at Ludlow Racecourse located near Ludlow, Shropshire, England by 7 lengths. He went on to win a number of other novice races, including the Cleanevent Novices' Chase, EBF Future Champions "National Hunt" Novices' Hurdle and the Now Live At WBX Novices' Chase.

The final win in Aces Four’s career was arguably his most significant. At the 2007 Grand National meeting, Aces Four won the Mildmay Novices' Chase at Aintree Racecourse. Entering the race as a 5-2 favourite, he beat Fassel by a remarkable 8 lengths despite a mistake made by Graham Lee’s mount at the onset of the race. After the win at Aintree, Aces Four was on his way to a win in the Punchestown Champion Novice Chase in Punchestown, Ireland, but crashed at the last hurdle, ending hopes for his first Grade 1 race win. While Aces Four was slightly concussed, jockey Graham Lee suffered a broken elbow from the fall. Afterward, Aces Four was never the same, missing a number of races and disappointing in those he did compete. Although a star novice horse, he failed to reach the lofty expectations placed on him after his win in at Aintree. Murphy once said of his prized horse: "He is a horse that I thought could go right to the top."

== Retirement ==
Aces Four was officially retired in December 2009 as a result of lingering injuries. Speaking on the retirement of his horse, Murphy said: "He was a grand horse and the day he won at Aintree he looked very good. I spoke to the owners earlier this month and we agreed it was better to send him to a quiet retirement than possibly break him down trying to bring him back."

His career record finished with 6 wins, 4 places and 3 show. His wins were split with three each coming in hurdling and flat races. In total, he accumulated £89,190 in lifetime earnings.
