= Kentucky Turf Cup =

- Class: Grade II
- Location: Kentucky Downs; Franklin, Kentucky, United States
- Inaugurated: 1990 (as Sam Houston Stakes)
- Race type: Thoroughbred – Flat racing
- Sponsor: AGS (since 2026)
- Website: Kentucky Downs

Race information
- Distance: 1 1/2 miles
- Surface: Turf
- Track: Left-handed
- Qualification: Three-year-olds and older
- Weight: Base weights with allowances: 4-year-olds and up: 126 lbs. 3-year-olds: 122 lbs.
- Purse: US$2,000,000 (since 2026)
- Bonuses: Winner automatic entry into Breeders' Cup Turf

The Kentucky Turf Cup is a Grade II American Thoroughbred horse race for three-year-olds and up, over a distance of 1 1/2 miles on turf. It is held annually in September at Kentucky Downs racetrack in Franklin, Kentucky, during their brief turf racing meet. The event currently carries a purse of $2,000,000, which includes $1,000,000 from the Kentucky Thoroughbred Development Fund.

== History ==
The event was inaugurated on 22 April 1990 as the Sam Houston Stakes on the first ever meeting at the new track, then the Duelling Grounds Racecourse. The race was in honor of Sam Houston, who took part in a duel on the site of where the racetrack is located near the border of Kentucky and Tennessee. The following year, the event was renamed the Sam Houston Handicap, and conditions were changed to a handicap.

In 1996 and 1997, the event was not held because the track was shut down and in bankruptcy proceedings.

When the track reopened in 1998, the race was renamed the Kentucky Cup Turf Handicap as part of the Kentucky Cup Turf Festival. In 2001, the event was classified as a Grade III.

In 2019, the purse was increased to $1,000,000.

In 2021, the Thoroughbred Owners and Breeders Association upgraded the event to a Grade II. For the 2021 running, Kentucky Downs renamed the event The Calumet Turf Cup, which Calumet Farm sponsors. The event winner, Imperador, set a new track record for the distance of 2:25.70.

== Records ==
Speed record

- 1 1/2 miles: 2:24.72 – Ole Crazy Bone (2025) (new track record)

Margins

- 6 3/4 lengths – Silverfoot (2005)

Most wins

- 2 – Rochester (2002, 2003)
- 2 – Da Big Hoss (2015, 2016)
- 2 – Arklow (2018, 2020)

Most wins by an owner

- 2 – Augustin Stable (2002, 2003)
- 2 – Robert E. Courtney Jr. (2011, 2012)
- 2 – Skychia Racing (2015, 2016)
- 2 – Donegal Racing, Joseph Bulger & Peter Coneway (2018, 2020)

Most wins by a jockey

- 4 – Florent Geroux (2014, 2016, 2018, 2020)

Most wins by a trainer

- 6 – Michael J. Maker (2015, 2016, 2017, 2019, 2022, 2025)

== Winners ==
Year	Winner	Age	Jockey	Trainer	Owner	Distance	Time	Purse	Grade	Ref
Kentucky Turf Cup
2026	Tiffany (IRE)	6	Luke Morris	Sir Mark Prescott	Elite Racing 004	1 1/2 miles	2:26.37	$1,095,000	II	
2025	Ole Crazy Bone	5	Flavien Prat	Michael J. Maker	Flying P Stable	1 1/2 miles	2:24.72	$2,496,667	II	
2024	Grand Sonata	5	Tyler Gaffalione	Todd A. Pletcher	Whisper Hill Farm	1 1/2 miles	2:24.93	$1,995,000	II	
2023	Get Smokin	6	Fernando De La Cruz	Mark E. Casse	Ironhorse Racing Stable, BlackRidge Stables, T-N-T Equine Holdings & Saratoga Seven Racing Partners	1 1/2 miles	2:28.66	$1,675,429	II	
2022	Red Knight	8	Gerardo Corrales	Michael J. Maker	Trinity Farm	1 1/2 miles	2:26.96	$694,180	II	
Calumet Turf Cup
2021	Imperador (ARG)	5	Joseph Talamo	Paulo Lobo	Bonne Chance Farm and Stud R D I	1 1/2 miles	2:25.10	$715,105	II	
Kentucky Turf Cup Stakes
2020	Arklow	6	Florent Geroux	Brad H. Cox	Donegal Racing, Joseph Bulger & Peter Coneway	1 1/2 miles	2:28.66	$910,000	III	
2019	Zulu Alpha	6	Jose L. Ortiz	Michael J. Maker	Michael M. Hui	1 1/2 miles	2:28.62	$986,500	III	
2018	Arklow	4	Florent Geroux	Brad H. Cox	Donegal Racing, Joseph Bulger & Peter Coneway	1 1/2 miles	2:30.56	$746,500	III	
2017	Oscar Nominated	4	Julien R. Leparoux	Michael J. Maker	Ken & Sarah Ramsey	1 1/2 miles	2:31.37	$594,000	III	
2016	Da Big Hoss	5	Florent Geroux	Michael J. Maker	Skychai Racing (Harvey Diamond & Jim Shircliff)	1 1/2 miles	2:35.08	$594,180	III	
2015	Da Big Hoss	4	Joseph Rocco Jr.	Michael J. Maker	Skychai Racing (Harvey Diamond & Jim Shircliff)	1 1/2 miles	2:33.40	$600,000	III	
2014	Suntracer	6	Florent Geroux	Chris M. Block	Team Block	1 1/2 miles	2:27.12	$347,400	III	
2013	Temeraine	4	Gary L. Stevens	Thomas F. Proctor	Niall Racing (Timothy B. & Patrick F. Turney)	1 1/2 miles	2:29.18	$399,000	III	
2012	Ioya Bigtime	8	Jeffrey Sanchez	Chris M. Block	Robert E. Courtney Jr.	1 1/2 miles	2:30.06	$200,000	III	
2011	Rahystrada	7	Greta Kuntzweiler	Byron G. Hughes	Robert E. Courtney Jr.	1 1/2 miles	2:32.40	$150,000	III	
2010	Rezif	5	Greta Kuntzweiler	Matthew Jacobson	Donald Sexton, Matthew Jacobson & Thomas Baughman	1 1/2 miles	2:44.74	$150,000	III	
2009	Cloudy's Knight	9	Rosemary Homeister Jr.	Jonathan E. Sheppard	S J Stables (Shirley & Jerrold Schwartz)	1 1/2 miles	2:33.96	$150,000	III	
2008	Rumor Has It	7	Eduardo E. Perez	David H. Hinsley	William S. Patterson & James F. Glenn	1 1/2 miles	2:28.27	$200,000	III	
2007	General Jumbo (GB)	5	Jeremy Rose	H. Graham Motion	Thomas Conway	1 1/2 miles	2:26.98	$200,000	III	
2006	Embossed (IRE)	4	Larry Melancon	Niall M. O'Callaghan	Gary A. Tanaka	1 1/2 miles	2:36.92	$200,000	III	
2005	Silverfoot	5	Rafael Bejarano	Dallas Stewart	Chrysalis Stables (Stephanie S. Clark)	1 1/2 miles	2:30.30	$200,000	III	
Kentucky Turf Cup Handicap
2004	Sabiango (GER)	6	Brice Blanc	Tim Yakteen	Monty Roberts	1 1/2 miles	2:33.70	$200,000	III	
2003	† Rochester	7	Eddie Martin Jr.	Jonathan E. Sheppard	Augustin Stable	1 1/2 miles	2:31.39	$200,000	III	
2002	Rochester	6	Eddie Martin Jr.	Jonathan E. Sheppard	Augustin Stable	1 1/2 miles	2:38.28	$300,000	III	
2001	Chorwon	8	Jon Court	Hal R. Wiggins	Phoebe Ann Mueller	1 1/2 miles	2:28.68	$300,000	III	
2000	Down the Aisle	7	Robby Albarado	William I. Mott	Charles H. Deters	1 1/2 miles	2:27.70	$300,000	Listed	
1999	Fahris (IRE)	5	Shane Sellers	Kiaran P. McLaughlin	Shadwell Stable	1 1/2 miles	2:29.60	$300,000	Listed	
1998	Yaqthan (IRE)	8	Brian Dale Peck	Anthony L. Reinstedler	Merdonmar Stable (Sheikh Abdullah Majid Al Qasin)	1 1/2 miles	2:27.60	$300,000	Listed	
1996–1997		Race not held								
Sam Houston Handicap
1995	Lassigny	4	Pat Day	William I. Mott	Sultan bin Mohammed bin Saud Al Kabeer	abt. 1 1/2 miles	2:30.60	$250,000	Listed	
1994	Lindon Lime	4	Shane Sellers	W. Elliott Walden	Frank ManseII	abt. 1 1/2 miles	2:31.40	$300,000	Listed	
1993	Know Heights (IRE)	4	Kent Desormeaux	Robert B. Hess Jr.	Mike H. Sloan, et al.	abt. 1 1/2 miles	2:25.60	$300,000	Listed	
1992	Drummer Boy	4	Garrett Gomez	Dennis W. Ebert	Elise M. Ebert & Eleanore Cohen	abt. 1 1/2 miles	2:28.40	$300,000	Listed	
1991	Silver Medallion	5	Craig Perret	Philip M. Hauswald	John A. Franks	abt. 1 1/2 miles	2:31.30	$200,000	Listed	
1990	Slow Fuse	6	Randy P. Romero	J. Bert Sonnier	Saron Stable	abt. 1 1/2 miles	2:33.60	$250,000		

Notes:
† In the 2003 running, Art Variety was first past the post but was disqualified for interference in the straight and placed third. Rochester was declared the winner.

== See also ==
List of American and Canadian Graded races
