= Damon Runyon Stakes =

- Class: Restricted stakes
- Location: Aqueduct Racetrack; South Ozone Park, Queens, New York
- Inaugurated: 1979
- Race type: Thoroughbred - Flat racing

Race information
- Distance: 7 Furlongs
- Surface: Dirt
- Track: left-handed
- Qualification: bred in New York State
- Purse: $100,000

The Damon Runyon Stakes is an American Thoroughbred horse race operated by the New York Racing Association (NYRA) at its Aqueduct Racetrack in South Ozone Park, Queens. First run in 1979, the annual event is currently contested on dirt over a distance of 7 furlongs. Restricted to horses bred in New York State, it was usually run in the late fall or early winter and open for two-year-olds only until 2020. With no race in 2019, those two-year-olds who turned three in 2020 competed when it was run on March 15.

One of a series of NYRA races for New York-bred horses, it is an important part of maintaining the significant breeding industry in that state.

The race is named for Damon Runyon, a famous sports reporter and short story writer who created a Broadway all his own during the Twenties and Thirties. From these stories came the musical Guys and Dolls. Runyon loved horse racing and campaigned a small string of his own horses.

== Historical notes ==
The Damon Runyon Stakes was raced on the turf course in 1990, 1991 and 1993. It was hosted by the NYRA's Belmont Park in 1979 and again in 1983-84.

The Inaugural running of the Damon Runyon took place at Belmont Park on October 15, 1979. The feature race of the day, it was won by the Assunta Louis Farm's colt Restrainor under jockey Ruben Hernandez.

Leo O'Brien won this race three times but his 1990 win would come with the best horse he would ever train, Fourstars Allstar. The following year the horse made history when owner Richard Bomze and his Irish-born trainer took the colt to Ireland where he won the May 18, 1991 Irish 2000 Guineas. Although a number of horses bred in the United States and owned by Americans had won top level races in Europe, no horse trained in the United States had ever won a European classic race.

== Records ==
Speed record:

- 1:22.40 @ 7 furlongs: Notebook (1987)
- 1:42.78 @ 1 mile, 70 yards: Ibboye (2009)

Most wins by a jockey:

- 4 - Mike E. Smith (1990, 1992, 1993, 2006)
- 4 - Aaron Gryder (1998, 2000, 2002, 2015)
- 4 - Manuel Franco (2021, 2022, 2023, 2024)

Most wins by a trainer:

- 4 - Rudy R. Rodriguez (2014, 2018, 2020, 2024)

Most wins by an owner:

- 2 - Assunta Louis Farm (1979, 1980)
- 2 - Alfred G. Vanderbilt Jr. (1992, 1998)
- 2 - Michael Dubb (2014, 2021)
- 2 - Chester Broman, Sr. (2016, 2025)

== Winners ==
Year	Winner	Age	Jockey	Trainer	Owner	Dist. (Miles) (Furlongs)	Time	Win $
2025	Sand Devil	3	Jose Lezcano	Linda Rice	Chester Broman, Sr.	7 f	1:24.66	$100,000
2024	Antonio of Venice	3	Manuel Franco	Rudy R. Rodriguez	Michael Imperio, Robert Cotrone, Hibiscus Stables LLC & Rudy R. Rodriguez	6 f	1:10.35	$100,000
2023	Looms Boldly	3	Manuel Franco	Brad H. Cox	Ten Strike Racing	6 f	1:13.75	$100,000
2022	Rotknee	3	Manuel Franco	Michael J. Maker	William J. Butler	7 f	1:27.06	$100,000
2021	Excellent Timing	3	Manuel Franco	Chad C. Brown	Michael Dubb, Wonder Stables, & Madaket Stables	7 f	1:28.02	$55,000
2020	Dream Bigger	3	Junior Alvarado	Rudy R. Rodriguez	Repole Stable	7 f	1:25.89	$55,000
2019	Race not held							
2018	Not That Brady	2	Reylu Gutierrez	Rudy R. Rodriguez	Michael Imperio, Rudy R. Rodriguez, Lianna Stables, Inc.	1 m	1:40.68	$55,000
2017	Empire Line	2	Eric Cancel	George Weaver	West Point Thoroughbreds & RAP Racing	1 m	1:38.75	$60,000
2016	Haul Anchor	2	Cornelio Velásquez	Kiaran P. McLaughlin	Chester Broman Sr. & Mary Broman	1 m	1:45.69	$60,000
2015	Extinct Charm	2	Aaron Gryder	Gary Contessa	John L. Moirano, William Achenbaum, Monty Foss, Steven Wecker	1 m, 70 yds.	1:44.73	$60,000
2014	Good Luck Gus	2	Ruben Silvera	Rudy R. Rodriguez	Michael Dubb, Bethlehem Stables & The Elkstone Group	1 m, 70 yds.	1:45.80	$60,000
2013	Samraat	2	José Santos	Richard Violette Jr.	My Meadowview Farm	1 m, 70 yds.	1:44.09	$60,000
2012	Smooth Bert	2	Mike Luzzi	Leah Gyarmati	Bona Venture Stables	1 m	1:39.70	$48,000
2011	Swag Daddy	2	Junior Alvarado	Richard E. Dutrow Jr.	Eric Fein	1 m, 70 yds.	1:43.90	$39,000
2010	Beau de Beaupre	2	Alan Garcia	James A. Jerkens	Nassau CC Stables	1 m, 70 yds.	1:45.33	$39,000
2009	Ibboyee	2	Ramon Dominguez	Todd A. Pletcher	Anstu Stables, Inc.	1 m, 70 yds.	1:42.78	$41,910
2008	Haynesfield	2	Ramon Dominguez	Steven M. Asmussen	Turtle Bird Stable	1 m, 70 yds.	1:42.95	$50,265
2007	Giant Moon	2	Ramon Dominguez	Richard Schosberg	Albert Fried Jr.	1 m, 70 yds.	1:46.07	$48,270
2006	Lawrence the Roman	2	Mike E. Smith	Richard E. Dutrow Jr.	Lawrence P. Roman	1 m, 70 yds.	1:44.48	$43,236
2005	Platinum Couple	2	Jose Espinoza	Joseph A. Lostritto	Team TriStar Stable	1 m, 70 yds.	1:46.60	$51,150
2004	Naughty New Yorker	2	Jean-Luc Samyn	Patrick J. Kelly	Fox Ridge Farm, Inc.	1 m, 70 yds.	1:44.40	$51,435
2003	West Virginia	2	Richard Migliore	Todd A. Pletcher	Donald Zuckerman & Roberta Mary Zuckerman	1 m, 70 yds.	1:47.80	$50,205
2002	Grey Comet	2	Aaron Gryder	Gary C. Contessa	Star Track Farms	1 m, 70 yds.	1:44.20	$49,575
2001	Eye Of The Comet	2	Robert Messina	Sal Iorio Jr.	Cecil H. Fiske	1 m, 70 yds.	1:46.40	$48,945
2000	Bluesbreaker	2	Aaron Gryder	H. Allen Jerkens	Southbelle Stable	1 m, 70 yds.	1:44.20	$49,560
1999	Kirtons	2	Mike Luzzi	Michael Hushion	Eugene Melnyk	1 m, 70 yds.	1:44.80	$31,950
1998	Ewer All Wet	2	Aaron Gryder	Mary E. Eppler	Alfred G. Vanderbilt Jr.	1 m, 70 yds.	1:46.40	$32,310
1997	Undaunted Mettle	2	Jorge Chavez	Gary C. Contessa	Monty Foss & John Moirano	1 m, 70 yds.	1:46.00	$33,900
1996	Regal Chant	2	Clovis Crane	Richard J. Lugovich	Richard J. Lugovich	1 m, 70 yds.	1:45.80	$32,220
1995	Shoppers Gold	2	José Santos	Kenneth A. Nesky	New River Stable	1 m, 70 yds.	1:45.40	$33,030
1994	Ave's Flag	2	John Velazquez	Leo O'Brien	David McNulty, Josef Omland	1 m, 70 yds.	1:46.80	$33,330
1993	Seminole Spirt	2	Mike E. Smith	Leo O'Brien	Diane K. Bomze	1 m (t)	1:41.80	$44,400
1992	Over the Brink	2	Mike E. Smith	Mary E. Eppler	Alfred G. Vanderbilt Jr.	1 m	1:36.60	$57,330
1991	Montreal Marty	2	Julie Krone	Flint S. Schulhofer	Vendome Stable	1 m ( t)	1:37.60	$56,340
1990	Fourstars Allstar	2	Mike E. Smith	Leo O'Brien	Richard Bomze	1 m ( t)	1:37.20	$56,700
1989	Champagneforashley	2	Jacinto Vasquez	Howard M. Tesher	Lion's Head Farm	1 m	1:35.00	$54,000
1988	Scarlet Ibis	2	Jacinto Vasquez	Richard T. DeStasio	Michael T. Martin	7 f	1:24.00	$54,000
1987	Notebook	2	José Santos	D. Wayne Lukas	Eugene V. Klein	7 f	1:22.40	$42,480
1986	Sweet Envoy	2	Jacinto Vasquez	Richard Violette Jr.	Camgi Stable	1 m	1:36.20	$41,880
1985	Bullet Blade	2	Robbie Davis	Murray M. Garren	Murray M. Garren	1 m	1:37.20	$39,960
1984	Hot Debate	2	Don MacBeth	Del W. Carroll II	William S. Farish III	1 m	1:38.40	$42,180
1983	Donna's World	2	Angel Cordero Jr.	Bruce N. Levine	Betty G. Marcus	1 m	1:39.40	$34,380
1982	Aloha Hawaii	2	Gregg McCarron	Paulino Ortiz	Seven Zee Stable	7 f	1:25.80	$33,840
1981	Guilford Lad	2	Eddie Maple	William H. Turner Jr.	Welcome Farm	7 f	1:24.60	$49,320
1980	Adirondack Holme	2	Ruben Hernandez	Ramon M. Hernandez	Assunta Louis Farm	7 f	1:23.60	$49,770
1979	Restrainor	2	Ruben Hernandez	Ramon M. Hernandez	Assunta Louis Farm	7 f	1:27.60	$47,970
