= Sycamore Stakes =

Grade II American Thoroughbred race in Kentucky

- Class: Grade II
- Location: Keeneland; Lexington, Kentucky, United States
- Inaugurated: 1995
- Race type: Thoroughbred – Flat racing
- Website: www.keeneland.com

Race information
- Distance: 1 1/2 miles (12 furlongs)
- Surface: Turf
- Track: Left-handed
- Qualification: Three-year-olds and older
- Weight: Base weight with allowances 4-year-olds and up: 125 lbs. 3-year-olds: 122 lbs.
- Purse: US$300,000 (since 2022)

The Sycamore Stakes is a Grade II American Thoroughbred horse race for three-year-olds or older, over a distance of 1 1/2 miles on the turf held annually in October at Keeneland Race Course, Lexington, Kentucky during the autumn meeting. The event currently carries a purse of $300,000.

== History ==
The inaugural running of the event was on 12 October 1995 over a distance of 1 5/8 miles and was won by Frank Mansell's five-year-old Lindon Lime who was ridden by US Hall of Fame jockey Craig Perret. Lindon Lime started as the even money favorite and won finishing strongly by 4 1/2 lengths in a time of 2:42.11 setting a new track record for the distance.

In 2001 the distance was reduced one furlong to 1 1/2 miles. The event was won by Rochester who in his career win the event two more times (2002, 2005) and placing third as well in 2004.

In 2015 the event was upgraded to a Grade III.

Due to extremely wet conditions, the Sycamore was run "off the turf" on the polytrack in 2011. The event was also run at 1 5/8 miles, originally scheduled for 1 1/2 miles. The American Graded Stakes Committee determined that the race lose its grade for the 2013 running which was also run on the polytrack.

Between 2001 and 2006 the Breeders' Cup sponsored the event which reflected in the name of the event.

In 2025 the event was upgraded to Grade II by the Thoroughbred Owners and Breeders Association.

== Records ==
Speed record

- 1 1/2 miles: 2:26.08 (new track record) Highway Robber (2024)
- 1 5/8 miles (turf): 2:38.68 Royal Strand (IRE) (1999)
- 1 5/8 miles (polytrack): 2:39.40 Sanagas (GER) (2011)

Margins

- 5 1/2 lengths: Royal Strand (IRE) (1999)

Most wins:

- 3 – Rochester (2001, 2002, 2005)

Most wins by a jockey:

- 4 – Pat Day (1999, 2001, 2002, 2003)

Most wins by a trainer:

- 5 – Jonathan E. Sheppard (2000, 2001, 2002, 2005, 2009)

Most wins by an owner:

- 6 – Augustin Stable (2000, 2001, 2002, 2005, 2014, 2015)

== Winners ==
Year	Winner	Age	Jockey	Trainer	Owner	Distance	Time	Purse	Grade	Ref
2026	Lambeth	5	Jose L. Ortiz	Joe Sharp	Carl R. Moore Management	1 1/2 miles	2:28.08	$400,000	II	
2025	Desvio	4	John R. Velazquez	Madison F. Meyers	Stonelea Stables & Bonnie Rye Stabel	1 1/2 miles	2:29.16	$341,875	II	
2024	Highway Robber	4	Tyler Gaffalione	Brian A. Lynch	Jim & Susan Hill	1 1/2 miles	2:26.08	$289,500	III	
2023	Bold Act (IRE)	3	Jamie Spencer	Charlie Appleby	Godolphin	1 1/2 miles	2:28.08	$269,213	III	
2022	Highland Chief (IRE)	5	John R. Velazquez	H. Graham Motion	Mrs. Fitriani Hay	1 1/2 miles	2:28.87	$266,813	III	
2021	Spooky Channel	6	Julien R. Leparoux	Jason Barkley	NBS Stable	1 1/2 miles	2:29.71	$150,000	III	
2020	Red Knight	6	James Graham	William I. Mott	Trinity Farm	1 1/2 miles	2:28.81	$150,000	III	
2019	Marzo	4	Ricardo Santana Jr.	Michael J. Maker	Three Diamond Farms	1 1/2 miles	2:32.72	$150,000	III	
2018	Zulu Alpha	5	Channing Hill	John Alexander Ortiz	Michael M. Hui	1 1/2 miles	2:34.21	$100,000	III	
2017	Big Bend	3	Drayden Van Dyke	Thomas F. Proctor	Union Rags Racing	1 1/2 miles	2:33.24	$100,000	III	
2016	Renown (GB)	5	Angel Cruz	Elizabeth Voss	Merriebelle Stable	1 1/2 miles	2:35.37	$100,000	III	
2015	Holiday Star	5	Edgar S. Prado	H. Graham Motion	Augustin Stable	1 1/2 miles	2:33.06	$100,000	III	
2014	Holiday Star	4	Rosie Napravnik	H. Graham Motion	Augustin Stable	1 1/2 miles	2:33.83	$100,000	III	
2013	Najjaar	4	James Graham	Daniel C. Peitz	Shadwell Farm	1 5/8 miles	2:41:49	$100,000	Listed	
2012	Kindergarten Kid	5	Julien R. Leparoux	Michael J. Maker	Ken & Sarah Ramsey	1 1/2 miles	2:31.80	$100,000	III	
2011	Sanagas (GER)	5	Rajiv Maragh	H. Graham Motion	Andreas Jacobs	1 5/8 miles	2:39.40	$100,000	III	
2010	Brass Hat	9	Calvin H. Borel	William B. Bradley	Fred Bradley	1 1/2 miles	2:30.73	$100,000	III	
2009	Cloudy's Knight	9	Rosemary Homeister Jr.	Jonathan E. Sheppard	S J Stables	1 1/2 miles	2:30.87	$125,000	III	
2008	Always First (GB)	7	Rene R. Douglas	Thomas H. Voss	Merriefield Farm	1 1/2 miles	2:30.98	$150,000	III	
2007	Transduction Gold	4	James Graham	John Glenney	Kim & John Glenney	1 1/2 miles	2:31.96	$137,500	III	
2006	Revved Up	8	Garrett K. Gomez	Christophe Clement	Live Oak Plantation Racing	1 1/2 miles	2:29.83	$163,800	III	
2005	Rochester	9	Gary L. Stevens	Jonathan E. Sheppard	Augustin Stable	1 1/2 miles	2:34.30	$161,100	III	
2004	Mustanfar	3	Jose A. Santos	Kiaran P. McLaughlin	Shadwell Stable	1 1/2 miles	2:30.88	$162,300	III	
2003	Sharbayan (IRE)	5	Pat Day	Wallace Dollase	Iron County Farms & Miller Trust	1 1/2 miles	2:29.55	$138,200	III	
2002	Rochester	6	Pat Day	Jonathan E. Sheppard	Augustin Stable	1 1/2 miles	2:30.48	$154,400	Listed	
2001	Rochester	5	Pat Day	Jonathan E. Sheppard	Augustin Stable	1 1/2 miles	2:31.29	$166,200	Listed	
2000	Crowd Pleaser	5	Calvin H. Borel	Jonathan E. Sheppard	Augustin Stable	1 5/8 miles	2:44.00	$74,675	Listed	
1999	Royal Strand (IRE)	5	Pat Day	W. Elliott Walden	James H. Stone	1 5/8 miles	2:38.68	$69,375	Listed	
1998	Royal Strand (IRE)	4	Shane Sellers	W. Elliott Walden	James H. Stone	1 5/8 miles	2:41.93	$55,500	Listed	
1997	Gleaming Key	5	Shane Sellers	Hilary A. Pridham	Barry Golden	1 5/8 miles	2:45.86	$54,000	Listed	
1996	Gleaming Key	4	Robby Albarado	P. Noel Hickey	George B. Peterson Jr.	1 5/8 miles	2:44.49	$52,910	Listed	
1995	Lindon Lime	5	Craig Perret	W. Elliott Walden	Frank Mansell	1 5/8 miles	2:42.11	$60,760	Listed	

Legend:
All Weather Track Turf

== See also ==
- List of American and Canadian Graded races
