= Brass Hat =

American-bred Thoroughbred racehorse

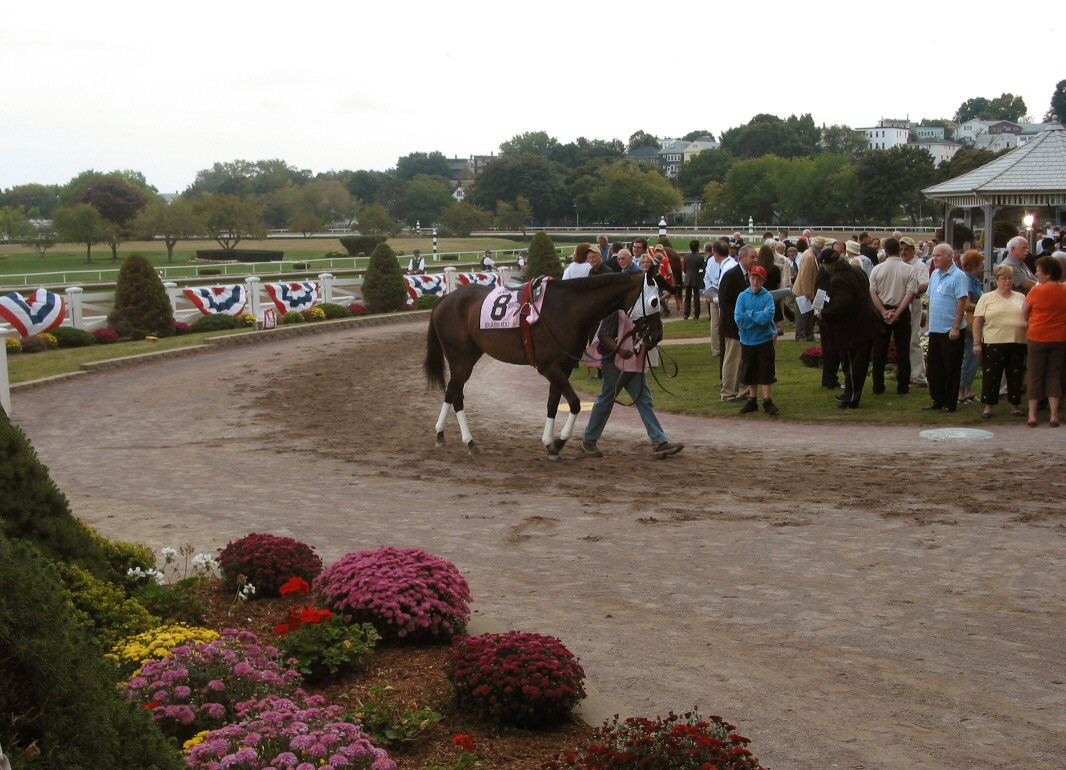
- Brass Hat in the Suffolk Downs paddock before the start of the 2007 Massachusetts Handicap
- Sire: Prized
- Grandsire: Kris S.
- Dam: Brassy
- Damsire: Dixie Brass
- Sex: Gelding
- Foaled: 2001
- Country: United States
- Colour: Bay
- Breeder: Fred F. Bradley
- Owner: Fred F. Bradley
- Trainer: William "Buff" Bradley
- Record: 39-10-8-5-69
- Earnings: $2,167,919

Major wins
- Indiana Derby (2004); Ohio Derby (2004); Rushaway Stakes (2004); New Orleans Handicap (2006); Donn Handicap (2006); Massachusetts Handicap (2007); Louisville Handicap (2009); Sycamore Stakes (2010)
- Last updated on May 23, 2009

Brass Hat (foaled May 22, 2001 in Kentucky) is an American Thoroughbred racehorse.

== Background ==
Brass Hat is out of the mare Brassy and sired by Prized, winner of the 1989 Breeders' Cup Turf and a son of the highly successful sire Kris S.

Bred and raced by Fred F. Bradley of Frankfort, Kentucky, and trained by his son William "Buff" Bradley.

== Racing career ==
After a successful three-year-old season in 2004, Brass Hat won once in two starts in 2005. In 2006 he won two of four starts. He set a new Gulfstream Park track record of 1:47.79 for 9 furlongs in the Grade I Donn Handicap. He finished second to Electrocutionist in the March 25th Dubai World Cup but was disqualified after a post-race test revealed trace amounts of the banned drug methyl prednisolone acetate. While owner Fred Bradley did not dispute the positive test, he asserted that the therapeutic medication given the horse 28 days prior to the World Cup was well within the guidelines put out by the Emirates Racing Association. The disqualification was upheld on appeal. In mid summer, Brass Hat suffered a sesamoid fracture that kept him out of racing for several months.

Returning to the track in 2007, Brass Hat set another track record at Churchill Downs, winning an 8.5 furlong race in 1:41.27. He then finished eighth in the Whitney Handicap and sixth in the Woodward Stakes at Saratoga Race Course but returned to winning form in September when he captured the Massachusetts Handicap. He then finished eighth in the 2007 Fayette Stakes and second Clark Handicap.

Returning to the track in 2008, the then seven-year-old gelding brought in a strong performance in the grade 1 Donn Handicap, a race that he had won two years before, finishing fourth. Then he headed to Fairgrounds, to race in the New Orleans Handicap, where he once again finished fourth.

He also finished third in the Fifth Third Elkhorn Stakes, fourth in the Louisville Handicap, fifth in the Stephen Foster Handicap to two time Horse of the Year Curlin, eighth in the Dust Commander Stakes, and just recently, fifth in the grade 2 Muniz Handicap.

On May 23, 2009, after going winless since September 2007, Brass Hat took the Louisville Handicap under Calvin Borel (winner of 2009's Kentucky Derby, Kentucky Oaks and Preakness Stakes). With this win, the 8-year-old gelding nears the two million mark in earnings. And then at the age of 9, on October 21, 2010, he took the Sycamore Stakes taking him over 2 million dollars.
