= Cloudy's Knight =

American-bred Thoroughbred racehorse

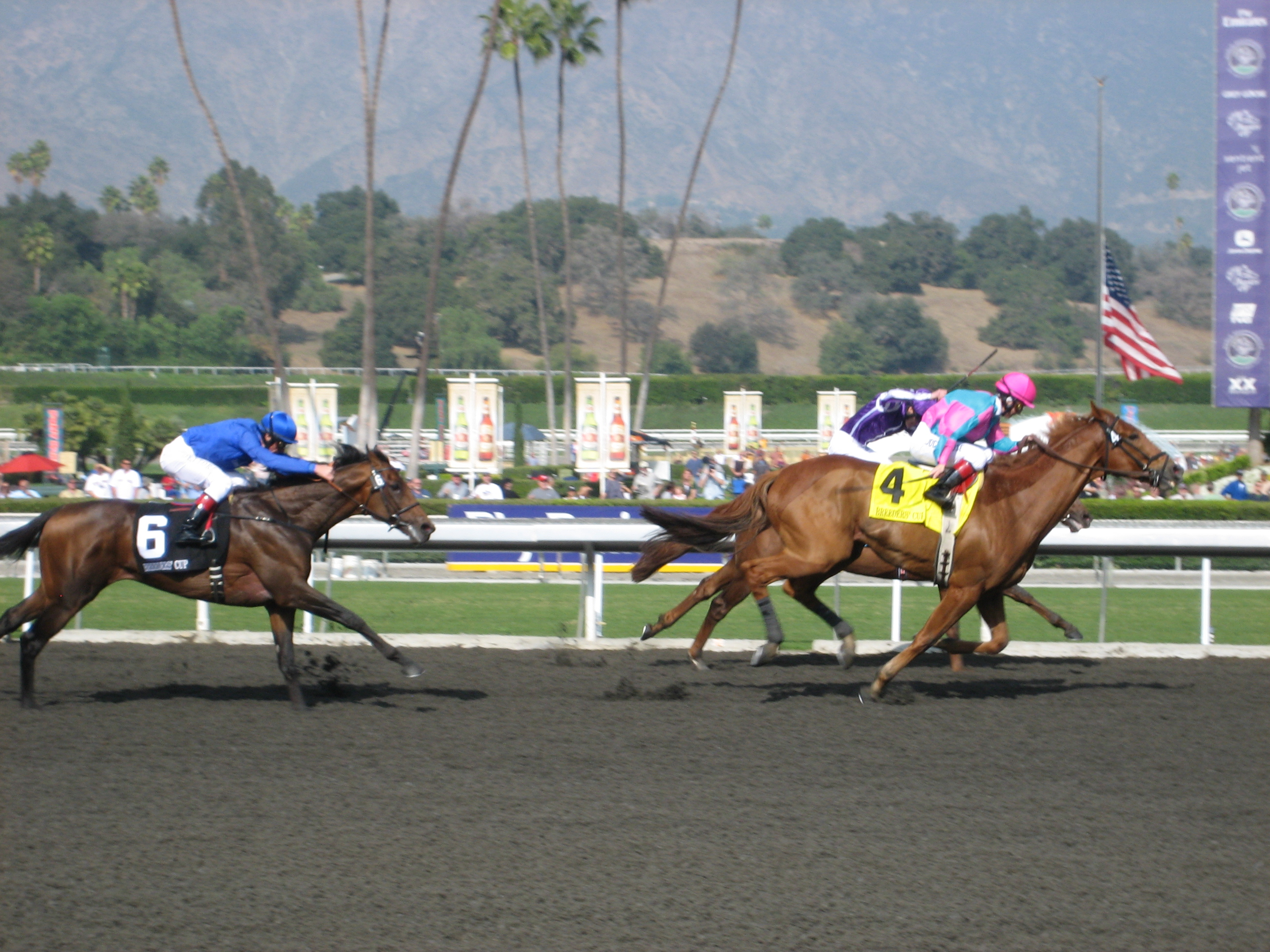
- Cloudy's Knight (#4) in the 2009 Breeders' Cup Marathon
- Sire: Lord Avie
- Grandsire: Lord Gaylord
- Dam: Cloudy Spot
- Damsire: Solar City
- Sex: Gelding
- Foaled: May 2, 2000
- Country: United States
- Colour: Chestnut
- Breeder: Jerrold Schwartz
- Owner: S J Stables LLC
- Trainer: James McMullen; Frank J. Kirby; Jonathan E. Sheppard
- Record: 41: 14-9-4
- Earnings: US$2,491,620

Major wins
- John Henry Stakes (2004); Rossi Gold Stakes (2005); Fair Grounds Handicap (2007); Sky Classic Stakes (2007); Canadian International Stakes (2007); Sycamore Stakes (2009); Kentucky Cup Turf Stakes (2009); Valedictory Stakes (2009); W. L. McKnight Handicap (2009)

Awards
- Canadian Champion Male Turf Horse (2007)

Cloudy's Knight (foaled May 2, 2000 in Kentucky) is an American Thoroughbred racehorse. Out of Northern Dancer's granddaughter Cloudy Spot, he was sired by the 1980 American Champion Two-Year-Old Colt, Lord Avie. The horse has been successful racing on both synthetic dirt and turf.

In 2007, under trainer Frank Kirby, ridden by Ramsey Zimmerman, Cloudy's Knight won the richest and most important race of his career, the $2 million Grade 1 Canadian International Stakes at Woodbine Racetrack in Toronto, Canada. This win combined with his victory in Woodbine's G2 Sky Classic Stakes, contributed to his being voted Canada's Sovereign Award for Champion Male Turf Horse.

In 2009, following a year-long layoff as a result of a serious tendon injury, the nine-year-old gelding came back to another highly successful campaign for trainer Jonathan Sheppard. Under Champion jockey Rosemary Homeister, Jr., Cloudy's Knight raised his career earnings to more than $2.4 million with wins in the Kentucky Cup Turf Stakes and Sycamore Stakes at tracks in Kentucky, a second by a nose in the mile and three-quarter Breeders' Cup Marathon at Santa Anita Park , and on December 6, he won in the mile and three-quarter Valedictory Stakes at Woodbine. . In his final race in the year 2009, the 9-year-old took the W. L. McKnight Handicap from Presious Passion, who had won the race in 2007 & 2008.
