= Red Smith Stakes =

- Class: Grade II
- Location: Belmont Park; Elmont, New York, United States
- Inaugurated: 1960
- Race type: Thoroughbred – Flat racing

Race information
- Distance: 1 3/16 miles (9.5 furlongs)
- Surface: Tapeta
- Track: Left-handed
- Qualification: Three-year-olds & up
- Purse: $250,000 (2026)

The Red Smith Stakes is an American Thoroughbred horse race run annually at Belmont Park in Elmont, New York. The race is run at a distance of 1 3/16 miles over the synthetic Tapeta surface and is open to horses aged three and older. From 1960 until 2025, it was a turf race run at both Belmont and the former Aqueduct Racetrack.

Inaugurated in 1960, it was run as the Edgemere Handicap until 1981. Previously, there had been a race on dirt known as the Edgemere Handicap which was contested at a distance of a mile and one furlong. Last run in 1957, this turf race was renamed the Red Smith Handicap in honor of the late Walter "Red" Smith, an honored and respected sports columnist for over 45 years who won a Pulitzer Prize in 1976. In 2019, it was changed to the Red Smith Stakes.

The Red Smith has been run at various distances:

- 1 3/8 miles : 1960–1962, 1968–1971, 1994–2005, 2007–2025
- 1 3/16 miles : 1963–1967, 2026–present
- 1 1/16 miles : 1977
- 1 1/4 miles : 1972 to 1976, 1978–1993, 2006

The Red Smith was run at Aqueduct Racetrack from 1963 to 1967, and from 1994 until 2025. It was run in two divisions in 1977, 1983, and 1986. There was no race in 1979.

In 1984, 1997, 2006 and 2018, the Red Smith was taken off the turf and run on the dirt. The 1997 race was shortened to 1 1/4 miles, and the 2018 race was shortened to 1 1/8 miles.

With the reopening of Belmont Park in 2026, the New York Racing Association moved the race to Belmont's new winter meet in December, changing it to a 1 3/16-mile race over its new Tapeta racing surface.

== Records ==
Most wins:

- 2 – Boisterous (2011, 2012)
- 2 – Drumtop (1970, 1971)

Most wins by an owner:

- 3 – Phipps Stable (2011, 2012. 2013)

Most wins by a jockey:

- 5 – Ángel Cordero Jr. (1969, 1970, 1977, 1979, 1985)

Most wins by a trainer:

- 6 – Claude R. McGaughey III (2011, 2012, 2013, 2020, 2024, 2025)

== Winners ==
Year	Winner	Age	Jockey	Trainer	Owner	Distance	Time	Win$	Grade
2025	Cugino	4	Flavien Prat	C. R. McGaughey III	West Point Thoroughbreds and Jimmy Kahig LLC	1 3/8	2:17.13	$250,000	G2
2024	Integration	4	Flavien Prat	C. R. McGaughey III	West Point Thoroughbreds & Woodford Racing LLC	13/8	2:13.28	$300,000	G2
2023	Master Piece (CHI)	7	Jose Lezcano	Richard E. Dutrow Jr.	Michael Iavarone, Julia C. Iavarone, Nicholas Zoumas, Dino Baccari, Frank Argano & Peter Douglass	13/8	2:14.56	$300,000	G2
2022	Astronaut	5	Kendrick Carmouche	Thomas Albertrani	John M. B. O'Conner	13/8	2:14.00	$300,000	G2
2021	Serve The King	5	Irad Ortiz Jr.	Chad C. Brown	Peter M. Brant	13/8	2:16.60	$200,000	G3
2020	North Dakota	4	Jose Lezcano	C. R. McGaughey III	Allen Stable Inc.	13/8	2:16.47	$100,000	3
2019	Sadler's Joy	6	Javier Castellano	Thomas Albertrani	Woodslane Farm LLC	13/8	2:15.76	$110,000	G3
2018	Village King	4	John R. Velazquez	Todd A. Pletcher	Angels of Catalina, Inc.	13/8	1:52.95	$110,000	L/R
2017	Spring Quality	5	Edgar Prado	Graham Motion	Augustin Stable	13/8	2:17.72	$120,000	G3
2016	Bigger Picture	5	José Ortiz	Michael J. Maker	Three Diamonds Farm	13/8	2:15.46	$120,000	
2015	Mr. Maybe	4	Irad Ortiz Jr.	Chad C. Brown	Michael Dubb & Highclere America	13/8	2:17.49	$90,000	
2014	Dynamic Sky	4	Cornelio Velásquez	Mark E. Casse	John C. Oxley	13/8	2:18.85	$90,000	
2013	Imagining	5	Joel Rosario	Claude R. McGaughey III	Phipps Stable	13/8	2:18.43	$150,000	
2012	Boisterous	5	Edgar Prado	Claude R. McGaughey III	Phipps Stable	13/8	2:19.38	$150,000	
2011	Boisterous	4	Alan Garcia	Claude R. McGaughey III	Phipps Stable	13/8	2:20.26	$150,000	
2010	Grassy	4	Joe Bravo	Christophe Clement	Claiborne Farm & Adele Dilschneider	13/8	2:20.06	$90,000	
2009	Expansion	4	Channing Hill	Chad C. Brown	Mary & Gary West	13/8	2:18.93	$90,000	
2008	Strike a Deal	4	Chuck C. Lopez	Alan E. Goldberg	Jayeff B Stables	13/8	2:23.28	$90,000	
2007	Dave	6	Joe Bravo	Barclay Tagg	Partingglass Stable et al.	13/8	2:21.45	$90,000	
2006	Naughty New Yorker	5	Jean-Luc Samyn	Patrick J. Kelly	Fox Ridge Farm Inc.	11/4	2:04.52	$90,000	
2005	King's Drama	5	Edgar Prado	Robert J. Frankel	Gary A. Tanaka	13/8	2:15.37	$90,000	
2004	Dreadnaught	4	Jean-Luc Samyn	Thomas Voss	Trillium Stable	13/8	2:18.87	$90,000	
2003	Balto Star	5	John Velazquez	Todd A. Pletcher	Anstu Stables, Inc.	13/8	2:18.86	$90,000	
2002	Evening Attire	4	Shaun Bridgmohan	Patrick J. Kelly	J. M. Grant & T. J. Kelly	13/8	2:14.81	$90,000	
2001	Mr. Pleasentfar	4	José A. Santos	Martin D. Wolfson	Raja Malek	13/8	2:16.94	$90,000	
2000	Cetewayo	6	Richard Migliore	Michael Dickinson	Dr. John Chandler	13/8	2:17.93	$90,000	
1999	Monarch's Maze	3	Joe Bravo	Patrick J. Kelly	Live Oak Racing	13/8	2:14.44	$90,000	
1998	Musical Ghost	6	John Velazquez	Mark A. Hennig	Edward P. Evans	13/8	2:15.53	$90,000	
1997	Instant Friendship	4	John Velazquez	Leo O'Brien	Sultan Al Kabeer	13/8	2:17.08	$90,000	
1996	Mr. Bluebird	5	Mike E. Smith	John C. Kimmel	Thomas R. Warfield	13/8	2:15.35	$87,750	
1995	Flag Down	5	José A. Santos	Christophe Clement	Allen E. Paulson	13/8	2:22.03	$69,900	
1994	Franchise Player	5	Dale Beckner	Philip G. Johnson	Austin K. Smith	13/8	2:20.53	$72,120	
1993	Royal Mountain Inn	4	Julie Krone	Barclay Tagg	Steadfast Stable	11/4	1:59.80	$71,760	
1992	Montserrat	4	Julie Krone	W. Elliott Walden	Preston Madden	11/4	2:00.20	$70,920	
1991	Who's To Pay	5	Jerry Bailey	MacKenzie Miller	Rokeby Stables	11/4	1:58.00	$71,160	
1990	Yankee Affair	8	Jose Santos	Henry L. Carroll	Ju Ju Gen Stable	11/4	2:00.20	$70,560	
1989	Rambo Dancer	5	Jose Santos	LeRoy Jolley	Maktoum Hasher Maktoum Al Maktoum	11/4	2:01.00	$72,360	
1988	Pay the Butler	4	Robbie Davis	Robert J. Frankel	Edmund A. Gann	11/4	2:01.40	$118,620	
1987	Theatrical	5	Pat Day	William I. Mott	Bertram R. Firestone	11/4	2:00.80	$116,460	
1986	Divulge	5	Jean Cruguet	Gasper Moschera	Albert Davis	11/4	1:59.00	$90,150	
1986	Equalize	4	Walter Guerra	Jan H. Nerud	Tartan Farms	11/4	2:02.20	$88,950	
1985	Sharannpour	4	Ángel Cordero Jr.	Robert J. Frankel	Jerry Moss	11/4	2:04.20	$101,100	
1984	Hero's Honor	4	Jerry Bailey	MacKenzie Miller	Rokeby Stables	11/4	2:02.20	$89,400	
1983	Super Sunrise	4	Craig Perret	Warren A. Croll Jr.	Blanche P. Levy	11/4	2:06.80	$67,200	
1983	Thunder Puddles	4	Jean-Luc Samyn	John P. Campo	Rockwood Stable	11/4	2:06.40	$67,200	
1982	Highland Blade	4	Jacinto Vásquez	David A. Whiteley	Pen Y Bryn Farm	11/4	2:06.40	$69,000	
1981	Match the Hatch	5	Kenny Skinner	Philip G. Johnson	Kathy M. Johnson	11/4	1:59.60	$68,160	
1980	Marquee Universal	4	Hector Pilar	Alec Bullock	Gerald Freed	11/4	1:58.80	$67,680	
1979	Waya	5	Ángel Cordero Jr.	David A. Whiteley	Peter M. Brant	11/4	2:04.20	$65,445	
1978	Tiller	4	Jeffrey Fell	David A. Whiteley	William H. Perry	11/4	2:00.20	$33,960	
1977	Clout	5	George Martens	William O. Hicks	Cambridge Stable	11/16	1:40.00	$25,927	
1977	Quick Card	4	Ángel Cordero Jr.	Thomas J. Kelly	John M. Schiff	11/16	1:39.60	$25,687	
1976	Erwin Boy	5	Ron Turcotte	James P. Conway	Sea High Stable	11/4	2:01.20	$28,110	
1975	Telefonico	4	Craig Perret	Lou M. Goldfine	Roberto Barcala	11/4	2:03.00	$17,400	
1974	Take Off	5	Ron Turcotte	Frank Catrone	Ada L. Rice	11/4	2:00.40	$23,070	
1973	Red Reality	7	Jorge Velásquez	MacKenzie Miller	Cragwood Stables	11/4	2:13.20	$16,890	
1972	New Alibhai	4	Frank Iannelli	Ralph W. McIlvain	Elcee H Stable	11/4	2:02.40	$16,935	
1971	Drumtop	5	Chuck Baltazar	Roger Laurin	James B. Moseley	13/8	2:16.60	$19,560	
1970	Drumtop	4	Ángel Cordero Jr.	Roger Laurin	James B. Moseley	13/8	2:20.40	$19,110	
1969	Majetta	5	Ángel Cordero Jr.	Angel Penna Sr.	Gustave Ring	13/8	2:19.00	$18,915	
1968	High Hat	4	Eddie Belmonte	Kay E. Jensen	Mrs. Wallace Gilroy	13/8	2:20.20	$18,330	
1967	Ginger Fizz	5	Fernando Toro	Thomas J. Kelly	Esther D. du Pont	13/16	1:55.00	$19,825	
1966	Spoon Bait	4	John L. Rotz	Ivor G. Balding	Cornelius Vanderbilt Whitney	13/16	1:54.40	$18,557	
1965	Tenacle	5	Bobby Ussery	Homer C. Pardue	Joseph R. Straus	13/16	1:55.40	$19,825	
1964	Will I Rule	5	Braulio Baeza	Joseph Nash	Fitz Eugene Dixon Jr.	13/16	1:55.80	$18,558	
1963	Vimy Ridge	4	Sam Boulmetis	Thomas J. Barry	Frank E. Power	13/16	1:59.40	$18,395	
1962	Wise Ship	5	Heliodoro Gustines	Jacob Byer	Milton J. Ritzenberg	13/8	2:16.00	$18,460	
1961	Wolfram	5	Ismael Valenzuela	Burley Parke	Harbor View Farm	13/8	2:15.00	$18,492	
1960	North Pole II	4	Sam Boulmetis Sr.	Sidney J. Smith	John S. Kroese	13/8	2:15.00	$18,550	
