= San Luis Rey Stakes =

Annual American Thoroughbred horse race in California

- Class: Grade III
- Location: Santa Anita Park; Arcadia, California, United States
- Inaugurated: 1952
- Race type: Thoroughbred – Flat racing
- Website: www.santaanita.com

Race information
- Distance: 1 1/2 miles (12 furlongs)
- Surface: Turf
- Track: downhill chute, left-handed
- Qualification: Four-year-olds & up
- Weight: Assigned
- Purse: $100,000

The San Luis Rey Stakes is an American Thoroughbred horse race run annually at Santa Anita Park in Arcadia, California. Held during the third week of March, the Grade III event is open to horses of either gender, age four and up, willing to race one and one-half miles (12 furlongs) on the turf. The race normally begins on Santa Anita's downhill chute; from this position horses race down the hill and cross the dirt track before running one complete lap of the main turf course.

Prior to 1955, the race was restricted to California-foaled three-year-olds and in 1958 and 1959 to three-year-olds and up. It was contested on dirt at 7 furlongs in 1952, 6 furlongs in 1953, one mile in 1954, and at 1 1/2 miles in 1962. The race was transferred to the dirt track in 1975 and in 1989 was started on the backstretch instead of its normal position on the hillside. Two divisions were run in 1966, 1967, 1968 and 1970.

In its 66th running in 2013, Bright Thought won with a final time of 2:22.72, a world record time for 1 1/2 miles that stood for only one week; Twilight Eclipse lowered the standard at Gulfstream Park one week later.

== Records ==
Speed record: (at current distance of 1 1/2 miles)

- 2:22.72 – Bright Thought (2013)

Most wins:

- 2 – Cedar Key (1965, 1966)
- 2 – Noble Dancer (1978, 1979)
- 2 – John Henry (1980, 1981)
- 2 – Bourbon Bay (2010, 2012)
- 2 – Itsinthepost (2017,2018)

Most wins by a jockey:

- 7 – Bill Shoemaker (1956, 1957, 1961, 1966, 1967 (2), 1970)

Most wins by a trainer:

- 9 – Charlie Whittingham (1970, 1975, 1977, 1982, 1983, 1985, 1986, 1988, 1989)

== Winners ==
Year	Winner	Age	Jockey	Trainer	Owner	Time
2026	Gold Phoenix (IRE)	8	Hector Isaac Berrios	Philip D'Amato	Agave Racing Stable, Little Red Feather Racing, Sterling Stables LLC and Marsha Naify	2:26.79
2025	Atitlan	4	Hector Isaac Berrios	John A. Shirreffs	John M. B. O'Connor	2:24.73
2024	Missed the Cut	5	Antonio Fresu	John W. Sadler	Bee Zee LLC, Lanes End Racing, St. Elias Stables LLC, Edward P. Babington, Edward J. Hudson Jr. and Lynne Hudson	2:26.98
2023	Offlee Naughty	5	Umberto Rispoli	Michael McCarthy	Jim & Donna Daniell	2:24.87
2022	Acclimate	6	Ricardo Gonzalez	Philip D'Amato	The Ellwood Johnston Trust, Timmy Time Racing LLC, Brooke & Ryan Bartlett, and Michel & Tevelde Goritz	2:25.40
2021	United	6	Flavien Prat	Richard Mandella	LNJ Foxwoods	2:25.51
2020	Ward'n Jerry	7	Flavien Prat	Mike Puype	Larry D & Marianne Williams	2:28.67
2019	Epical	4	Tyler Baze	Jim Cassidy	DP Racing LLC	2:24.06
2018	Itsinthepost	6	Tyler Baze	Jeff Mullins	Red Baron's Barn LLC	2:27.73
2017	Itsinthepost (FR)	5	Tyler Baze	Jeff Mullins	Red Baron's Barn LLC	2:25.43
2016	Generosidade (URU)	7	Tiago Josue Pereira	Paulo H. Lobo	Haras Phillipson	2:28.80
2015	Ashleyluvssugar	4	Gary Stevens	Peter Eurton	Alesia/Bran Jam Stable/Ciaglia Racing	2:25.78
2014	Fire With Fire	6	Tyler Baze	Neil D. Drysdale	David Heerensperger	2:25.03
2013	Bright Thought	4	Victor Espinoza	Jorge Gutierrez	Dye and Venneri Racing	2:22.72
2012	Bourbon Bay	6	Joel Rosario	Neil D. Drysdale	David & Jill Heerensperger	2:25.78
2011	Juniper Pass	4	Rafael Bejarano	Thomas Ray Bell II	Betty & Robert G. Irvin	2:32.64
2010	Bourbon Bay	4	Rafael Bejarano	Neil D. Drysdale	David and Jill Heerensberger	2:24.08
2009	Midships	4	Victor Espinoza	Robert J. Frankel	Juddmonte Farms	2:25.63
2008	Boule d'Or	7	Tyler Baze	Jeff Mullins	Robert D. Bone et al.	2:25.48
2007	Forty Niners Son	6	Garrett Gomez	Neil D. Drysdale	El Faruk Stable	2:27.50
2006	King's Drama	6	Jon Court	Robert J. Frankel	Gary A. Tanaka	2:26.50
2005	Stanley Park	5	Gary Stevens	John Shirreffs	Ann & Jerry Moss	2:24.45
2004	Meteor Storm	5	Jose Valdivia Jr.	Wallace Dollase	Jarvis, Margolis, et al.	2:26.03
2003	Champion Lodge	6	Alex Solis	Sanford Shulman	R. Charles & Clear Valley Stable	2:33.48
2002	Continental Red	6	Pat Valenzuela	Ian Jory	Sharon M. Fitzpatrick	2:26.81
2001	Blueprint	6	Gary Stevens	Robert B. Hess Jr.	Fog City Stable	2:28.57
2000	Dark Moondancer	5	Chris McCarron	Ron McAnally	Charles J. Cella	2:26.00
1999	Single Empire	5	Kent Desormeaux	Neil D. Drysdale	Sangster & Tanaka	2:27.97
1998	Kessem Power	6	Frankie Dettori	Mike R. Mitchell	Robert J. Baron	2:28.40
1997	Marlin	4	Chris McCarron	D. Wayne Lukas	Michael Tabor	2:28.14
1996	Windsharp	5	Eddie Delahoussaye	Wallace Dollase	Richard J. & Martha J. Stephen	2:27.91
1995	Sandpit	6	Corey Nakatani	Richard E. Mandella	Sierra Thoroughbreds	2:27.15
1994	Bien Bien	5	Chris McCarron	J. Paco Gonzalez	McCaffery & John Toffan	2:26.65
1993	Kotashaan	5	Kent Desormeaux	Richard E. Mandella	La Presle Farm	2:23.91
1992	Fly Till Dawn	6	Laffit Pincay Jr.	Darrell Vienna	Josephine T. Gleis	2:27.26
1991	Pleasant Variety	7	Gary Stevens	Jerry M. Fanning	Martin B. & Eileen Alpert	2:24.40
1990	Prized	4	Eddie Delahoussaye	Neil D. Drysdale	Clover Racing Stable et al. .	2:25.20
1989	Frankly Perfect	4	Eddie Delahoussaye	Charles E. Whittingham	Summa Stable	2:32.80
1988	Rivlia	6	Chris McCarron	Charles E. Whittingham	Narvick International	2:27.20
1987	Zoffany	7	Eddie Delahoussaye	John Gosden	Speelman, et al.	2:27.20
1986	Dahar	5	Alex Solis	Charles E. Whittingham	Summa Stable (Lessee)	2:26.40
1985	Prince True	4	Chris McCarron	Charles E. Whittingham	Mrs. Howard B. Keck	2:25.40
1984	Interco	4	Pat Valenzuela	Ted West	David I. Sofro	2:26.80
1983	Erins Isle	5	Laffit Pincay Jr.	Charles E. Whittingham	Brian Sweeney	2:26.20
1982	Perrault	5	Laffit Pincay Jr.	Charles E. Whittingham	Thierry van Zuylen & Serge Fradkoff	2:24.00
1981	John Henry	6	Laffit Pincay Jr.	Ron McAnally	Dotsam Stable	2:25.20
1980	John Henry	5	Darrel McHargue	Ron McAnally	Dotsam Stable	2:23.00
1979	Noble Dancer	7	Jacinto Vásquez	Thomas J. Kelly	Haakon Fretheim	2:34.60
1978	Noble Dancer	6	Steve Cauthen	Thomas J. Kelly	Haakon Fretheim	2:24.00
1977	Caucasus	5	Fernando Toro	Charles E. Whittingham	Cardiff Stud Farm	2:25.60
1976	Avatar	4	Laffit Pincay Jr.	Tommy Doyle	Arthur A. Seeligson Jr.	2:24.80
1975	Trojan Bronze	4	Jorge Tejeira	Charles E. Whittingham	Adrian B. Roks	2:29.60
1974	Astray	5	Jacinto Vásquez	David A. Whiteley	William Haggin Perry	2:24.40
1973	Big Spruce	4	Donald Pierce	Victor J. Nickerson	Elmendorf Farm	2:27.60
1972	Nor II	5	Danny Velasquez	John G. Canty	Castlebrook Farm & Canty	2:25.80
1971	Try Sheep	5	Fernando Alvarez	Noble Threewitt	Middle Ranch & LaTourrette	2:26.00
1970	Fiddle Isle	5	Bill Shoemaker	Charles E. Whittingham	Howard B. Keck	2:23.00
1970	Quilche	6	Jerry Lambert	Steve Ippolito	Kerr Stables	2:25.40
1969	Taneb	6	Ángel Cordero Jr.	Al A. Fiore	Barney Lobel	2:29.40
1968	Biggs	8	Jerry Lambert	Farrell W. Jones	Edward F. Gould	2:26.00
1968	Quicken Tree	5	Jerry Lambert	Clyde Turk	Rowan & Whitney	2:24.60
1967	Niarkos	7	Bill Shoemaker	John H. Adams	Hasty House Farm	2:26.00
1967	Fleet Host	4	Bill Shoemaker	Ray Priddy	Westerly Stud Farms	2:23.80
1966	Polar Sea	6	Bill Hartack	John Sullivan	Edward & Harry Seltzer	2:26.40
1966	Cedar Key	6	Bill Shoemaker	Don McCoy	Jerry Basta	2:25.20
1965	Cedar Key	5	Manuel Ycaza	Don McCoy	Jerry Basta	2:24.20
1964	Inclusive	4	Rudy Campas	George D. McIvor	G. D. McIvor & R. M. Foman	2:25.20
1963	The Axe II	5	Peter Moreno	Robert L. Wheeler	Greentree Stable	2:34.60
1962	Vinci	4	Rudy Campas	John H. Adams	Ralph Lowe	2:36.60
1961	Don't Alibi	5	Bill Shoemaker	Matt Dragna	Dragna & Son/ S. E. Santoro	2:26.20
1960	Lookout Point	7	Donald Pierce	J. Benak	Tom D. Atkins	2:33.40
1959	Infantry	6	George Taniguchi	Wayne B. Stucki	Sunny Side Stable	2:31.80
1958	Solid Son	5	Raymond York	Carl A. Roles	M/M Carl A. Roles	2:30.60
1957	Posadas	6	Bill Shoemaker	Willie F. Alvarado	Anita King & Harry Brown	2:27.60
1956	Blue Volt	7	Bill Shoemaker	Edward D. Cox	Altandor Stable & E. D. Cox	2:28.00
1955	Alidon	4	Roy Lumm	William Molter	Louis B. Mayer	2:26.40
1954	Allied	3	Raymond York	William Molter	Andrew J. Crevolin	1:35.60
1953	Tee Dee Gee	3	Johnny Longden	Ted D. Grimes	Mrs. Fred Grimes	1:11.20
1952	Dark Count	3	Gordon Glisson	Norman R. McLeod	L. R. Allison & M. R. Prestridge	1:24.20
