= Balto Star =

American thoroughbred racehorse

- Sire: Blitterman
- Grandsire: Dewan
- Dam: Miss Livi
- Damsire: Devil's Bag
- Sex: Gelding
- Foaled: 1998
- Country: USA
- Color: Dark Bay
- Breeder: Anstu Stables, Inc.
- Owner: Anstu Stables, Inc.
- Trainer: Todd A. Pletcher
- Record: 38:12-7-3
- Earnings: $2,363,780

Major wins
- Turfway Spiral Stakes (2001); Arkansas Derby (2001); Whirlaway Handicap (2003); United Nations Stakes (2003); Red Smith Handicap (2003); W. L. McKnight Handicap (2003)
- Last updated on May 20, 2020

Balto Star (foaled March 7, 1998, in Kentucky) is an American Thoroughbred racehorse and the winner of the 2003 United Nations Stakes.

== Career ==
Balto Star's first race was on September 16, 2000, at Belmont Park, where he finished in 8th place. He did not pick up his first win until January 1st, 2001, at Aqueduct. He picked up another win at the Aqueduct on February 18, 2001, then won his first graded race, the Turfway Spiral Stakes on March 24, 2001.

He then won his next graded race, the 2001 Arkansas Derby. This would be his last graded in for almost two years, until he came back with a win at the 2003 Whirlaway Handicap. In July, he picked up a win at the 2003 United Nations Stakes. In late 2003, he picked up two more graded wins. He won the 2003 Red Smith Handicap in November, and then won the December 27th, 2003 W. L. McKnight Handicap.

His final race was on October 8, 2004, where he won the Breeders' Cup Stakes.

== Pedigree ==
Pedigree of Balto Star (USA), 2015
Sire Glitterman (USA) 1985	Dewan (USA); 1965	Bold Ruler	Nasrullah
Sire Glitterman (USA) 1985	Dewan (USA); 1965	Bold Ruler	Miss Disco
Sire Glitterman (USA) 1985	Dewan (USA); 1965	Sunshine Nell	Sun Again
Sire Glitterman (USA) 1985	Dewan (USA); 1965	Sunshine Nell	Nellie Flag
Sire Glitterman (USA) 1985	Moon Glitter (USA); 1972	In Reality	Intentionally
Sire Glitterman (USA) 1985	Moon Glitter (USA); 1972	In Reality	My Dear Girl
Sire Glitterman (USA) 1985	Moon Glitter (USA); 1972	Foggy Note	The Axe
Sire Glitterman (USA) 1985	Moon Glitter (USA); 1972	Foggy Note	Silver Song
Dam Miss Livi (USA) 1994	Devil's Bag (USA); 1981	Halo	Hail To Reason
Dam Miss Livi (USA) 1994	Devil's Bag (USA); 1981	Halo	Cosmah
Dam Miss Livi (USA) 1994	Devil's Bag (USA); 1981	Ballade	Herbager
Dam Miss Livi (USA) 1994	Devil's Bag (USA); 1981	Ballade	Miss Swapsco
Dam Miss Livi (USA) 1994	Canticle (USA); 1988	Stage Door Johnny	Prince John
Dam Miss Livi (USA) 1994	Canticle (USA); 1988	Stage Door Johnny	Peroxide Blonde
Dam Miss Livi (USA) 1994	Canticle (USA); 1988	Melody Roulette	Northern Dancer
Dam Miss Livi (USA) 1994	Canticle (USA); 1988	Melody Roulette	Musical Chairs
