= Yankee Affair =

American-bred Thoroughbred racehorse

- Sire: Northern Fling
- Grandsire: Northern Dancer
- Dam: My Malchen
- Damsire: Debbysman
- Sex: Stallion
- Foaled: 1982
- Country: United States
- Colour: Bay
- Breeder: Derry Meeting Farm
- Owner: Ju Ju Gen Stable
- Trainer: Henry L. Carroll
- Record: 55: 22-14-8
- Earnings: US$2,282,156

Major wins
- Pennsylvania Sprint Championship (1986); Creme de la Creme Purse (1987); Endurance-By-Name Handicap (1987); Sharanpour Stakes (1987); Tim Tam Purse (1987); Laurel Turf Cup Stakes (1987); Appleton Handicap (1988); Elkhorn Stakes (1988); King Edward Stakes (1988); Fort Harrod Stakes (1989); Turf Classic (1989); Man o' War Stakes (1989); Oceanport Stakes (1989); United Nations Stakes (1989); Red Smith Handicap (1990)

Honours
- Yankee Affair Stakes at Philadelphia Park
- Last updated on 16 July 2021

Yankee Affair (1982–1991) was an American multi-millionaire Thoroughbred racehorse. Foaled May 1, 1982 in Pennsylvania, he was purchased for $10,200 as a yearling by trainer Henry L. Carroll who owned one-third along with partners Jay Garsman and Martin Scheinman. He was raced under the nom de course Ju Ju Gen Stable, his three owners choosing the name as they referred to themselves as two Jews and a Gentile. Yankee Affair began racing on dirt but proved best on the turf.

In 1987 the five-year-old Yankee Affair began showing his ability on the turf, winning three stakes races including the Laurel Turf Cup Stakes at Laurel Park Racecourse near Laurel, Maryland. Among his wins in 1988, Yankee Affair equaled the world record for nine furlongs on turf with a time of 1:45 2/5 in winning the first division of the King Edward Gold Cup at Woodbine Racetrack in Toronto. In 1989 his wins included three Grade I races: the United Nations Handicap, Man o' War Stakes and Turf Classic. Yankee Affair finished second to Steinlen in the voting for the 1989 Eclipse Award for American Champion Male Turf Horse. In 1990, Yankee Affair won the Red Smith Handicap at New York's Belmont Park

On November 6, 1990, Yankee Affair ran his last race at Aqueduct Racetrack in New York, finishing second in the Knickerbocker Handicap. He retired as one of the leading money-earners in Thoroughbred racing history with a lifetime bankroll of $2,282,156. Yankee Affair died in 1991 from complications following surgery for a hairline fracture of the left pastern. Yankee Affair was buried at Henry Carroll's Farm in St. Matthews, SC.
