= Elkhorn Stakes =

- Class: Grade II
- Location: Keeneland; Lexington, Kentucky, United States
- Inaugurated: 1986
- Race type: Thoroughbred – Flat racing
- Sponsor: VisitLex (2026)
- Website: Keeneland

Race information
- Distance: 1 1/2 miles (12 furlongs)
- Surface: Turf
- Track: Left-handed
- Qualification: Four-year-olds and older
- Weight: 123 lbs with allowances
- Purse: $400,000 (since 2025)

The Elkhorn Stakes is a Grade II American Thoroughbred horse race for four-year-olds and older over a distance of 1 1/2 miles on the turf held annually in mid April at Keeneland Race Course, Lexington, Kentucky during the spring meeting. It currently offers a purse of $400,000.

== History ==
The event is named for Elkhorn and area which it is believed that Daniel Boone took his first steps in what is now Kentucky near present-day Elkhorn City on a hunting expedition. Also the name is synonymous with Elkhorn Creek, a stream running through several counties in Central Kentucky.

The event was inaugurated on 20 April 1986 and was won by Lieutenant's Lark, starting 10-1 went wire-to-wire with Frank Lovato Jr. aboard in a time of 1:54 3/5 over the 1 1/8 miles distance. The event was increased to the current distance of a mile and one half in 1996.

A Grade III event from 1988 to 1989 and from 1996 to 2007, it was a Grade II event from 1990 to 1995 and in 2008 was returned to its Grade II status.

Several champions have won this event including the 1986 US Champion Male Turf Horse Manila in his season debut of 1987 and the dual Breeders' Cup Mile winner Lure who won this event in 1994 easily by four lengths as a short priced favorite. Both these champions won the event when it was 1 1/8 miles. Chief Bearhart won this event at the 1 1/2 miles distance in 1997 en route to becoming Canadian Horse of the Year and also US Champion Male Turf Horse.

== Records ==
Speed record

- 1 1/2 miles: 2:27.10 – Channel Maker (2022)
- 1 1/8 miles: 1:47.00 – Marvin's Faith (IRE) (1995)

Margin

- 9 3/4 lengths – Burnham Square (2026)

Most wins

- 2 – African Dancer (1998, 1999)
- 2 – Kim Loves Bucky (2002, 2003)
- 2 – Musketier (GER) (2010, 2011)

Most wins by an owner

- 2 – Pin Oak Stable (1998, 1999)
- 2 – Kim Glenney (2002, 2003)
- 2 – Phipps Stable (2008, 2012)
- 2 – Sam-Son Farm (1997, 2021)

Most wins by a jockey

- 5 – Jerry Bailey (1992, 1998, 1999, 2000, 2004)

Most wins by a trainer

- 4 – Roger Attfield (2006, 2009, 2010, 2011)
- 4 – Michael J. Maker (2013, 2016, 2019, 2020)

== Winners ==
Year	Winner	Age	Jockey	Trainer	Owner	Distance	Time	Purse	Grade	Ref
2026	Burnham Square	4	Brian J. Hernandez Jr.	Ian R. Wilkes	Whitham Thoroughbreds	1 1/2 miles	2:32.55	$389,500	II	
2025	Utah Beach	5	Vincent Cheminaud	Ignacio Correas IV	Jeffrey S. Amling & Merriebelle Stable	1 1/2 miles	2:29.78	$394,188	II	
2024	Silver Knott (GB)	4	Flavien Prat	Charlie Appleby	Godolphin Racing	1 1/2 miles	2:27.37	$313,750	II	
2023	Verstappen	4	Declan Cannon	Brendan P. Walsh	Andrew Farm, For the People Racing Stable, & Windmill Manor Farm	1 1/2 miles	2:29.28	$333,157	II	
2022	Channel Maker	8	Luis Saez	William I. Mott	Wachtel Stable, Gary Barber, R.A. Hill Stable, Reeves Thoroughbred Racing	1 1/2 miles	2:27.10	$310,538	II	
2021	Say the Word	6	Luis Saez	Philip D'Amato	Agave Racing Stable & Sam-Son Farm	1 1/2 miles	2:28.26	$200,000	II	
2020	Zulu Alpha	7	Tyler Gaffalione	Michael J. Maker	Michael M Hui	1 1/2 miles	2:30.82	$175,000	II	
2019	Bigger Picture	6	Tyler Gaffalione	Michael J. Maker	Three Diamonds Farm	1 1/2 miles	2:32.00	$250,000	II	
2018	One Go All Go	6	Chris Landeros	Charles L. Dickey	Rodney Paden	1 1/2 miles	2:30.76	$250,000	II	
2017	Itsinthepost (FR)	5	Tyler Baze	Jeff Mullins	Red Baron's Barn	1 1/2 miles	2:31.22	$250,000	II	
2016	Da Big Hoss	5	Florent Geroux	Michael J. Maker	Skychai Racing	1 1/2 miles	2:31.29	$250,000	II	
2015	Dramedy	6	Joe Bravo	Gerald Russel Aschinger	John James Revocable Trust	1 1/2 miles	2:31.17	$250,000	II	
2014	Unitarian	4	Javier Castellano	Todd A. Pletcher	Robert S. Evans	1 1/2 miles	2:32.60	$250,000	II	
2013	Dark Cove	6	Joel Rosario	Michael J. Maker	Kenneth and Sarah Ramsey	1 1/2 miles	2:30.84	$150,000	II	
2012	Point of Entry	4	John R. Velazquez	Claude R. McGaughey III	Phipps Stable	1 1/2 miles	2:29.45	$150,000	II	
2011	Musketier (GER)	9	John R. Velazquez	Roger L. Attfield	Stella Perdomo	1 1/2 miles	2:32.04	$150,000	II	
2010	Musketier (GER)	8	John R. Velazquez	Roger L. Attfield	Johanna Louise Glen-Teven	1 1/2 miles	2:31.32	$200,000	II	
2009	Spice Route (GB)	5	René R. Douglas	Roger L. Attfield	Attfield, Harlequin & Ralph Johnson	1 1/2 miles	2:29.23	$200,000	II	
2008	Dancing Forever	5	René R. Douglas	Claude R. McGaughey III	Phipps Stable	1 1/2 miles	2:29.79	$200,000	II	
2007	Ascertain (IRE)	6	Jamie Theriot	Niall M. O'Callaghan	Mrs. S. K. Johnston Jr., Paul J. Dixon & Dr. Gene Voss	1 1/2 miles	2:30.40	$200,000	III	
2006	Pellegrino (BRZ)	7	Shaun Bridgmohan	Roger L. Attfield	Gary A. Tanaka	1 1/2 miles	2:29.84	$200,000	III	
2005	Macaw (IRE)	6	Javier Castellano	Angel A. Penna Jr.	George Melillo	1 1/2 miles	2:32.62	$200,000	III	
2004	Epicentre	5	Jerry D. Bailey	Robert J. Frankel	Juddmonte Farms	1 1/2 miles	2:31.96	$150,000	III	
2003	Kim Loves Bucky	6	Kent J. Desormeaux	John Glenney	Kim Glenney	1 1/2 miles	2:29.39	$150,000	III	
2002	Kim Loves Bucky	5	Jorge F. Chavez	John Glenney	Kim Glenney	1 1/2 miles	2:32.49	$150,000	III	
2001	Williams News	6	Robby Albarado	Thomas M. Amoss	On Target Racing Stable	1 1/2 miles	2:29.13	$113,400	III	
2000	Drama Critic	4	Jerry D. Bailey	Mark A. Hennig	Amerman Racing Stables	1 1/2 miles	2:28.00	$112,500	III	
1999	African Dancer	7	Jerry D. Bailey	William I. Mott	Pin Oak Stable	1 1/2 miles	2:27.80	$109,900	III	
1998	African Dancer	6	Jerry D. Bailey	William I. Mott	Pin Oak Stable	1 1/2 miles	2:31.60	$107,600	III	
1997	Chief Bearhart	4	José A. Santos	Mark R. Frostad	Sam-Son Farm	1 1/2 miles	2:28.40	$110,200	III	
1996	Vladivostok	6	Pat Day	Neil J. Howard	Bayard Sharp	1 1/2 miles	2:30.80	$110,100	III	
1995	Marvin's Faith (IRE)	4	Craig Perret	Ian P. D. Jory	Marvin Malmouth	1 1/8 miles	1:47.00	$114,000	II	
1994	Lure	5	Mike E. Smith	Claude R. McGaughey III	Claiborne Farm	1 1/8 miles	1:53.60	$107,300	II	
1993	Coaxing Matt	4	Pat Day	Neil L. Pessin	Elmer E. Miller	1 1/8 miles	1:47.60	$110,650	II	
1992	Fourstars Allstar	4	Jerry D. Bailey	Leo O'Brien	Richard M. Bomze	1 1/8 miles	1:47.60	$112,300	II	
1991	Itsallgreektome	4	Russell Baze	Wallace Dollase	Jhayare Stables	1 1/8 miles	1:51.20	$109,450	II	
1990	Ten Keys	6	Randy Romero	Michael V. Pino	Charles Linhoss	1 1/8 miles	1:51.80	$109,950	II	
1989	Exclusive Partner	7	Fernando Toro	Richard E. Mandella	R. Dee Hubbard	1 1/8 miles	1:50.40	$84,450	III	
1988	Yankee Affair	6	Pat Day	Henry L. Carroll	Ju Ju Jen Stable	1 1/8 miles	1:49.60	$86,900	III	
1987	Manila	4	Jacinto Vásquez	LeRoy Jolley	Bradley M. Shannon	1 1/8 miles	1:48.40	$53,875		
1986	Lieutenant's Lark	4	Frank Lovato Jr.	Howard M. Tesher	Lowell T. Stevens	1 1/8 miles	1:54.60	$55,925		

== See also ==
- List of American and Canadian Graded races
