= Manila (horse) =

American-bred Thoroughbred racehorse

- Sire: Lyphard
- Grandsire: Northern Dancer
- Dam: Dona Ysidra
- Damsire: Le Fabuleux
- Sex: Stallion
- Foaled: 1983
- Country: United States
- Colour: Bay
- Breeder: Eduardo Cojuangco, Jr.
- Owner: Eduardo Cojuangco, Jr. Bradley M. Shannon
- Trainer: LeRoy Jolley
- Record: 18: 12-5-0
- Earnings: $2,692,799

Major wins
- Lexington Handicap (1986); Cinema Handicap (1986); Turf Classic (1986); Breeders' Cup Turf (1986); United Nations Handicap (1986, 1987); Elkhorn Stakes (1987); Turf Classic Stakes (1987); Arlington Million (1987)

Awards
- American Champion Male Turf Horse (1986)

Honours
- United States Racing Hall of Fame (2008); G3 Manila Stakes at Belmont Park (2014– )
- Last updated on 17 May 2021

Manila (February 5, 1983 – February 28, 2009) was an American Thoroughbred Hall of Fame Champion racehorse. He was sired by Northern Dancer's son Lyphard, out of the mare Dona Ysidra. He was bred by Filipino food and beverage magnate Eduardo Cojuangco, Jr. who owned Dona Ysidra and who named her for his grandfather's sister, Dona Ysidra Cojuangco (1867–1960) of Tarlac, reportedly the founder of the Cojuangco family fortune.

Manila was raced by Lexington, Kentucky, thoroughbred agent Bradley M. Shannon and trained by future U.S. Racing Hall of Fame inductee LeRoy Jolley. Considered a very great long-distance turf horse, in his fourteen starts on grass Manila never finished worse than second. In his 2006 book titled THE BEST and Worst of Thoroughbred Racing, author Steve Davidowitz of Daily Racing Form ranks Manila as the best long-distance turf horse in American racing history ahead of No.2, John Henry.

Racing at age three, Manila won the important Grade I Turf Classic at Belmont Park, then in the fall won the Breeders' Cup Turf, defeating the Champion filly, Estrapade, Theatrical, and the 1986 European Horse of the Year, Dancing Brave. For his 1986 performances, Manila was voted the United States' Eclipse Award for Outstanding Male Turf Horse.

In 1987, Manila repeated as the United Nations Handicap winner and defeated Theatrical again to win the Arlington Million. Injured in the fall, he was retired to stud duty at Lane's End Farm in Kentucky, having been syndicated for US$20 million.

Although Manila was reasonably successful as a sire, producing the California multiple graded stakes race winner Bien Bien, none of his offspring achieved his level of success. He stood at stud in İzmit, Turkey between 1999 and 2009. He died on February 28, 2009, due to "Aortic Ring Rupture”.
