= Hero's Honor =

American thoroughbred racehorse

- Sire: Northern Dancer
- Grandsire: Nearctic
- Dam: Glowing Tribute
- Damsire: Graustark
- Foaled: April 28th, 1980
- Country: United States
- Breeder: Paul Mellon
- Owner: Rokeby Stable
- Trainer: MacKenzie Miller
- Record: 18:8-2-3
- Earnings: $499,025

Major wins
- Fort Marcy Handicap (1984); Red Smith Handicap (1984); United Nations Handicap (1984); Bowling Green Handicap (1984)

Hero's Honor (foaled April 28, 1980) is an American Thoroughbred racehorse and the winner of the 1984 United Nations Handicap.

== Career ==
Hero's Honor's first race was on April 30, 1983, at the Aqueduct, where he came in fifth. He picked up his first win in a Maiden Special Weight race at Belmont Park on May 21, 1983.

He went on a three-race win streak in September 1983, grabbing a trio of allowance races at Belmont Park.

On September 29, 1983, in his fourth race that month, he came in 3rd in the Grade-2 Rutger's Handicap.

He scored his biggest win up to that point by winning the May 7th, 1984, Grade-3 Fort Marcy Handicap.

He went on another three-race win streak starting on June 2, 1984. He captured the Grade-2 Red Smith Handicap at Belmont Park. Fifteen days later, he won again at Belmont, this time grabbing a victory at the Grade-1 1984 Bowling Green Handicap. He finished his win streak with a Grade 1 win in the July 14, 1984, United Nations Handicap, which was his third graded win in less than 6 weeks. This was his last victory.

Hero's Honor finished the 1984 season with a 2nd and a 3rd place in September 1984 at Belmont Park, then retired after an October 13, 1984, 7th-place finish at the Ballantine's Scotch Classic Handicap.

== Stud career ==
Pedigree descendants include:

c = colt, f = filly

Foaled	Name	Sex	Major Wins
1988	Hero's Love	c	San Gorgonio Handicap
1995	Khumba Mela	c	Noble Damsel Handicap
1995	Generic	c	Prix Kergorlay
1996	Super Quercus	c	Hollywood Turf Cup Stakes

== Pedigree ==
Pedigree of Hero's Honor (USA), 1980
Sire Northern Dancer (USA) b. 1961	Nearctic (CAN) b. 1954	Nearco	Pharos
Sire Northern Dancer (USA) b. 1961	Nearctic (CAN) b. 1954	Nearco	Nogara
Sire Northern Dancer (USA) b. 1961	Nearctic (CAN) b. 1954	Lady Angela	Hyperion
Sire Northern Dancer (USA) b. 1961	Nearctic (CAN) b. 1954	Lady Angela	Sister Sarah
Sire Northern Dancer (USA) b. 1961	Natalma (USA) b. 1957	Native Dancer	Polynesian
Sire Northern Dancer (USA) b. 1961	Natalma (USA) b. 1957	Native Dancer	Geisha
Sire Northern Dancer (USA) b. 1961	Natalma (USA) b. 1957	Almahmoud	Mahmoud
Sire Northern Dancer (USA) b. 1961	Natalma (USA) b. 1957	Almahmoud	Arbitrator
Dam Glowing Tribute (USA) b. 1973	Graustark (USA) b. 1983	Ribot	Tenerani
Dam Glowing Tribute (USA) b. 1973	Graustark (USA) b. 1983	Ribot	Romanella
Dam Glowing Tribute (USA) b. 1973	Graustark (USA) b. 1983	Flower Bowl	Alibhai
Dam Glowing Tribute (USA) b. 1973	Graustark (USA) b. 1983	Flower Bowl	Flower Bed
Dam Glowing Tribute (USA) b. 1973	Admiring (USA) b. 1962	Hail To Reason	Turn-To
Dam Glowing Tribute (USA) b. 1973	Admiring (USA) b. 1962	Hail To Reason	Nothirdchance
Dam Glowing Tribute (USA) b. 1973	Admiring (USA) b. 1962	Searching	War Admiral
Dam Glowing Tribute (USA) b. 1973	Admiring (USA) b. 1962	Searching	Big Hurry
