= Noble Dancer =

British racehorse

- Sire: Prince de Galles
- Grandsire: Welsh Abbot
- Dam: Helen Traubel
- Damsire: Sing Sing
- Sex: Stallion
- Foaled: 1972
- Country: Great Britain
- Colour: Dark Bay
- Breeder: I. Werry
- Owner: Fretheim
- Trainer: Gordon Smyth (U.K.); Terje Dahl (Norway); Tommy Kelly (U.S.)
- Record: 43: 22-7-5
- Earnings: $939,215

Major wins
- Norway; Braathen Safe (1975); Norsk St. Leger (1975); Oslo Cup (1975, 1976); Bergen Bank Aerespraemie (1976) United States; Tidal Handicap (1977); Bougainvillea Handicap (1978); Hialeah Turf Cup Handicap (1978); San Luis Rey Stakes (1978, 1979); United Nations Handicap (1978, 1979); Canadian Turf Handicap (1979); Florida Turf Cup Handicap (1979); Pan American Handicap (1979)

Awards
- Norwegian Horse of the Year (1975)

Noble Dancer (1972 – June 27, 1994) was a British-born Thoroughbred racehorse who won back-to-back runnings of the Oslo Cup in Norway en route to earning Horse of the Year honors. In 1976 he was sent to compete in the United States where he was a dominant turf runner whose multiple top-level wins included back-to-back runnings of the Grade 1 United Nations Handicap as well as the San Luis Rey Stakes

== Racing career ==
Noble Dancer raced in England at age two where he was trained by Gordon Smyth who had won the 1966 Epsom Derby with Charlottown. Noble Dancer's most significant result was a second place finish in the August 17, 1974 Washington Singer Stakes at Newbury Racecourse. Under the ownership of Haakon Fretheim, an American-based Norwegian shipping executive, in Norway Noble Dancer was trained by former steeplechase jockey, Terje Dahl. Among his important wins there were the 1975 Norsk St. Leger and the Oslo Cup in both 1975 and 1976. Called "the best horse in Norwegian history" by The New York Times, in November of 1976 Noble Dancer was sent to the United States to compete in the Grade 1 Washington D.C. International Stakes at Laurel Park in Laurel, Maryland where he ran fourth to Youth. Remaining in the United States, due to a duplicate name he had to be registered as Noble Dancer II. His training was handled by future U.S. Racing Hall of Fame inductee Tommy Kelly. Noble Dancer competed and won at racetracks from coast to coast in the United States until he suffered a career-ending leg injury on October 17, 1979, while training at Belmont Park. The $8,222 bargain-basement purchase was retired to stud, having earned $939,215, of which $856,245 was in North America. As a sire, Noble Dancer met with modest success.

== Pedigree ==
Pedigree of Noble Dancer, bay colt, 1972
Sire Prince de Galles	Welsh Abbot	Abernant	Owen Tudor
Sire Prince de Galles	Welsh Abbot	Abernant	Rustom Mahal
Sire Prince de Galles	Welsh Abbot	Sister Sarah	Abbot's Trace
Sire Prince de Galles	Welsh Abbot	Sister Sarah	Sarita
Sire Prince de Galles	Vauchellor	Honeyway	Fairway
Sire Prince de Galles	Vauchellor	Honeyway	Honey Buzzard
Sire Prince de Galles	Vauchellor	Niobe	Caracalla
Sire Prince de Galles	Vauchellor	Niobe	Phaetusa
Dam Helen Traubel	Sing Sing	Tudor Minstrel	Owen Tudor
Dam Helen Traubel	Sing Sing	Tudor Minstrel	Sansonnet
Dam Helen Traubel	Sing Sing	Agin The Law	Portlaw
Dam Helen Traubel	Sing Sing	Agin The Law	Revolte
Dam Helen Traubel	Rose Petal	Flocon	Fastnet
Dam Helen Traubel	Rose Petal	Flocon	Fragment
Dam Helen Traubel	Rose Petal	Rose Bay Willow	Fairhaven
Dam Helen Traubel	Rose Petal	Rose Bay Willow	Willow Ann (family: 2-e)
