= Lure (horse) =

American-bred Thoroughbred racehorse

- Sire: Danzig
- Grandsire: Northern Dancer
- Dam: Endear
- Damsire: Alydar
- Sex: Stallion
- Foaled: May 14, 1989
- Died: November 15, 2017 (aged 28)
- Country: United States
- Colour: Bay
- Breeder: Claiborne Farm & the Gamely Corp.
- Owner: Claiborne Farm & Nicole Gorman
- Trainer: Claude R. McGaughey III
- Record: 25: 14-8-0
- Earnings: $2,515,289

Major wins
- Gotham Stakes (1992); Turf Classic Stakes (1993); Dixie Stakes (1993); Daryl's Joy Stakes (1993); Kelso Handicap (1993); Elkhorn Stakes (1994); Caesars International Handicap (1994); Bernard Baruch Handicap (1994); Breeders' Cup wins: Breeders' Cup Mile (1992, 1993)

Honours
- Hall of Fame inductee (2013) #85 - Top 100 U.S. Racehorses of the 20th Century; Lure Stakes at Saratoga (2014)
- Last updated on September 9, 2020

Lure (May 14, 1989 – November 15, 2017) was an American Thoroughbred racehorse who was best known for winning back to back Breeders' Cup Miles in 1992 and 1993. He began his career racing on dirt, and won the Gotham Stakes while on the Triple Crown trail. After losing his next two races though, his trainer decided to try him on the turf. After the switch, Lure won nine stakes races, three of them Grade I, and retired with earnings of over $2.5 million. He was inducted into the National Museum of Racing and Hall of Fame in 2013.

== Background ==
Lure was a bay horse who was bred in Kentucky by a partnership of Claiborne Farm and William Haggin Perry's Gamely Corporation. After Perry died, his share in the horse passed to his widow, Nicole Perry Gorman. Lure was a son of leading sire Danzig, who in turn was sired by Hall of Famer and prominent sire Northern Dancer. He was out of the stakes-winning mare Endear, who was sired by another Hall of Famer, Alydar.

Lure was trained by Hall of Famer Shug McGaughey.

== Racing career ==
Lure made his debut on June 13, 1991, in a maiden special weight over the dirt at Belmont Park, winning in a track record time of :56 1/5 for 5 furlongs. He then finished second in an allowance race before finishing sixth in the Grade I Champagne Stakes. He was then given some time off to recover from sore shins.

=== 1992: three-year-old season ===
Lure began his three-year-old campaign by winning an allowance race at Aqueduct on March 15, 1992, by 8 3/4 lengths. He then entered the Gotham Stakes on April 4, going off as the odds-on favorite despite never having won a stakes race. He and Devil His Due raced heads apart in third and fourth behind the early leaders, who set a rapid pace. Lure and Devil His Due then moved to the lead together and battled down the backstretch, completing the half mile in a "sensational" :43 4/5. McGaughey was concerned that the rapid pace was too much but the two colts continued to vie for the lead around the turn and down the stretch, finishing in a dead-heat at the wire.

Despite the win, McGaughey did not feel Lure was ready for the Kentucky Derby, though he initially thought the Preakness was a possibility. On April 21, Lure finished second in the Lexington Stakes after being passed in the final sixteenth of a mile. He made his next start on June 6 in the Riva Ridge Stakes, finishing sixth.

At this point, McGaughey asked Seth Hancock of Claiborne Farms to let him take Lure up to Saratoga to try training on the turf "and see if that changes him around". After freshening the colt over the summer, McGaughey entered Lure in an allowance race on the turf at Belmont on September 14. Lure responded with a 10 1/4 length win, then followed up with a second-place finish in the Kelso Handicap over a soft turf course.

McGaughey then shipped Lure to Gulfstream Park in Hallandale, Florida where the Breeders' Cup Mile was held on October 30. Lure blossomed during his preparation for the race. "I think with the warm weather and training him on the turf, whatever kinks might have been bothering him went away," recalled McGaughey in 2017. "To this day, I don't think when he ran in the Breeders' Cup that I had ever, or have ever, presented a horse as good as that horse looked in the paddock." Having drawn the inside post, Lure went straight to the lead and set fast opening fractions, then continued to draw away down the stretch to win by three lengths. Despite never being challenged, he set a course record of 1:32 4/5, breaking the existing record by a second.

=== 1993: four-year-old campaign ===
Lure started his four-year-old campaign with three straight wins, starting with an allowance race win at Keeneland on April 4, followed by the Turf Classic Stakes on April 30 at Churchill Downs and the Dixie Handicap at Pimlico on May 14. In the Turf Classic, he beat Star of Cozzene by 3/4 lengths while setting a course record of 1:46.34 for 1 1/8 miles that still stands. In the Dixie Handicap, he stumbled at the start but soon recovered and ran down the field in the stretch to win by 1 1/2 lengths over Star of Cozzene.

He then finished second to Star of Cozzene in the Manhattan Stakes on June 6. The loss prevented Lure from winning a $1 million bonus offered by Early Times, which sponsored the Turf Classic, Dixie and Manhattan at that time. On June 27, Lure again finished second to Star of Cozzene in the Caesars International Handicap after being run down in the stretch. "No big excuse," said jockey Mike Smith. "He just blew past me. The course was a little softer than we like, but they've all got to run on it. You're looking at the two best grass horses in America."

Lure then returned to Saratoga for the Daryl's Joy Stakes on July 30. He rated in fourth place during the early running, then kicked to the lead as they entered the stretch, drawing away to win by three lengths over Fourstardave. Lure next entered the Kelso Handicap on October 16 and won by 3 1/2 lengths over Paradise Creek with similar tactics.

The 1993 Breeders' Cup Mile was held at Santa Anita Park on November 6. Lure drew an outside post position, which was considered a serious disadvantage, but still went off as the betting favorite. He broke quickly but was carried seven wide into the first turn as the horses to his inside jockeyed for position. Lure assumed a narrow lead as they entered the backstretch and then continued to draw away, winning under a hand ride by 2 1/4 lengths over Ski Paradise. He was just the third horse to repeat at the Breeders' Cup.

The performance earned widespread praise, with sportswriter William Nack calling Lure "one of the most gifted horses seen on the American turf in recent years." European trainers Maurice Zilber and John Gosden agreed. "Lure is the best miler we have seen in a very long time, since Miesque," said Zilber. Despite Lure's excellent campaign, he lost the Eclipse Award for Outstanding Turf Horse to California-based Kotashaan, who was also named Horse of the Year.

=== 1994: five-year-old season ===
Lure won three stakes races in 1994: the Grade I Caesars International Handicap plus the Grade II Elkhorn Stakes and Bernard Baruch Handicap. He also finished second in the Turf Classic, Dixie Handicap and Kelso Handicap.

Lure was scheduled to make his international debut in the Sussex Stakes at Goodwood in England on July 27. However, he was unable to ship because of regulations related to equine viral arteritis (EVA): as he had been vaccinated for the disease in 1993, he would have tested positive for the antibodies to the disease.

Lure tried to win his third straight Breeders' Cup Mile at Churchill Downs on November 5, but was never a factor and finished ninth. "We were just hoping against hope in the Breeders' Cup," said McGaughey in 2017, referring to the horse's problems that year with a quarter crack. "He was a very, very good horse. He liked firm turf and he was just fast. He meant a lot to me at that time and he still does."

== Retirement ==
Lure was retired to stud at Claiborne Farm in 1995 but proved to have fertility problems, which resulted in Claiborne's insurance company paying a claim. Coolmore Stud then purchased Lure from the insurance company and stood him in Ireland and then at Ashford Stud (their North American location) for several years. In 2003, Lure was pensioned and returned to Claiborne Farm, where he lived until his death on November 15, 2017, at the age of 28, due to the infirmities of old age.

From nine limited crops, Lure produced 72 winners from 133 foals of racing age, including seven stakes winners. His most successful offspring was Orpen, who won the Group 1 Prix Morny in France and also finished third in the Irish 2000 Guineas. Orpen went on to become a successful international sire, with his 112 stakes winners including champions in Argentina, Peru, Saudi Arabia, Singapore, Slovakia, and Turkey. Lure also sired England's Legend, a stakes winner in France who shipped to the U.S. to capture the Grade 1 Beverly D. Stakes in 2001. Lure also sired Australian Group 3 winner Red Trinket.

In 2013, Lure was inducted into the National Museum of Racing and Hall of Fame in Saratoga Springs, NY. In the Blood-Horse magazine List of the Top 100 U.S. Racehorses of the 20th Century, Lure was ranked number 85.

== Pedigree ==
Pedigree of Lure, bay horse, foaled colt, May 14, 1989
Sire Danzig 1977	Northern Dancer; 1961	Nearctic	Nearco (ITY)
Sire Danzig 1977	Northern Dancer; 1961	Nearctic	*Lady Angela
Sire Danzig 1977	Northern Dancer; 1961	Natalma	Native Dancer
Sire Danzig 1977	Northern Dancer; 1961	Natalma	Almahmoud
Sire Danzig 1977	Pas de Nom; 1968	Admiral's Voyage	Crafty Admiral
Sire Danzig 1977	Pas de Nom; 1968	Admiral's Voyage	Olympia Lou
Sire Danzig 1977	Pas de Nom; 1968	*Petitioner	Petition (GB)
Sire Danzig 1977	Pas de Nom; 1968	*Petitioner	Steady Aim (GB)
Dam Endear 1982	Alydar; 1975	Raise a Native	Native Dancer
Dam Endear 1982	Alydar; 1975	Raise a Native	Raise You
Dam Endear 1982	Alydar; 1975	Sweet Tooth	On-and-On
Dam Endear 1982	Alydar; 1975	Sweet Tooth	Plum Cake
Dam Endear 1982	Chappaquiddick; 1968	Relic	War Relic
Dam Endear 1982	Chappaquiddick; 1968	Relic	Bridal Colors
Dam Endear 1982	Chappaquiddick; 1968	*Baby Doll	Dante (GB)
Dam Endear 1982	Chappaquiddick; 1968	*Baby Doll	Bebe Grande (GB) (family: 3-o)

Lure is inbred 4 x 4 to Native Dancer, meaning this stallion appears twice in the fourth generation of his pedigree.
