= Sandpit (horse) =

Brazilian-bred Thoroughbred racehorse

- Sire: Baynoun
- Grandsire: Sassafras
- Dam: Sand Dancer
- Damsire: Green Dancer
- Sex: Stallion
- Foaled: 1989
- Country: Brazil
- Colour: Chestnut
- Breeder: Haras São José da Serra
- Owner: Sergio Coutinho de Menezes (Sierra Thoroughbreds)
- Trainer: 1) Marcos Carvalho; 2) João Luis Maciel; 3) Richard E. Mandella
- Record: 40: 14-11-6
- Earnings: US$3,782,597

Major wins
- Grande Prêmio Linneo de Paula Machado (1992); Copa ANPC Clássica (1993); Grande Prêmio Cruzeiro do Sul (1993); Grande Prêmio Francisco Eduardo de Paula Machado (1993); Grande Prêmio Jose Paulino Nogueira (1993); Live the Dream Stakes (1994); Oak Tree Invitational Stakes (1994); San Luis Rey Handicap (1995); Caesars International Handicap (1995, 1996); Caesars Palace Turf Championship (1995); Hollywood Turf Handicap (1996); San Marcos Handicap (1997)

Awards
- Brazilian Champion Three-Year-Old Male Horse (1992)
- Last updated on August 28, 2015

Sandpit (1989–2003) was a Brazilian Champion Thoroughbred racehorse that also met with considerable success racing in the United States. In a career that lasted from 1992 until 1997, he ran forty times and won fourteen races. Which is a winning percentage of 35%.

== Background ==
Sandpit was bred by Rio de Janeiro banker Sergio Coutinho de Menezes at Haras São José da Serra in Paraná, who raced him under the name, Sierra Thoroughbreds.

Sandpit was sired by Baynoun, a runner-up in the England's St. Leger Stakes in 1984. His dam was Sand Dancer, a daughter of the 1991 Leading sire in France, Green Dancer, who was a Group One winner in England and France and a son of Nijinsky.

== Racing career ==
=== Brazil ===
Sandpit made twelve starts in Brazil in 1992 and 1993, winning five times. He was conditioned for racing by Marcos Carvalho through part of 1993 when his owner turned him over to one of the country's top trainers, João Luis Maciel.

A Southern Hemisphere two-year-old in 1992, Sandpit won the Grade 1 Grande Prêmio Linneo de Paula Machado and in 1993 added three more Grade 1 races to his résumé by capturing the Copa ANPC Clássica, Grande Prêmio Cruzeiro do Sul and Grande Prêmio Francisco Eduardo de Paula Machado. He was voted the 3-year-old Brazilian champion of 1993.

=== United States ===
==== 1994 ====
Sandpit was sent to compete in the United States in the summer of 1994, where his owner raced him from a base in California under the name of Sierra Thoroughbreds. He was trained by future U.S. Racing Hall of Fame inductee Richard Mandella. Racing on turf, in his American debut Sandpit finished second in an August allowance race at Del Mar Racetrack. He made his next start on September 10, winning Del Mar's Live the Dream Stakes by five lengths and in October won the Grade 1 Oak Tree Invitational Stakes at a mile and a half, earning US$180,000, which was roughly $68,000 more than his total earnings from his previous fourteen lifetime starts. Not eligible for the Breeders' Cup Turf race, Sandpit was taken to Japan to compete in the November 27, 1994, Japan Cup. He ran fifth to winner Marvelous Crown in a field of international stars which included Fraise, Jeune, Paradise Creek, and Raintrap.

==== 1995 ====
Making his first start since the Japan Cup, on March 1, 1995, Sandpit won an allowance race at Santa Anita Park then on March 26 captured the mile and a half Grade 1 San Luis Rey Handicap at the same track. On June 25, he won the Grade 1 Caesars International Handicap at the Atlantic City Race Course in New Jersey, the first of the two races in the East-to-West series, and on July 21 earned a $312,500 bonus for winning the second race of the series, the Caesars Palace Turf Championship at Hollywood Park Racetrack in California.

After his victory in the Caesars Palace Turf Championship, Sandpit went without a win in his next five starts. He finished second to Northern Spur in October's Oak Tree Invitational Stakes and did not compete in the Breeders' Cup since he was ineligible. After Northern Spur won the Breeders' Cup Turf, at the end of the year he won the Eclipse Award for American Champion Male Turf Horse honors with Sandpit as runner-up.

==== 1996 ====
Ten months after he won his last race, Sandpit returned to the winner's circle on May 27, 1996, when he defeated Northern Spur by 3½ lengths in the Hollywood Turf Handicap. On June 22, he won his second straight Caesars International Handicap, In other major races of 1996, Sandpit finished third in the Arlington Million Stakes and third in defending his Caesars Palace Turf Championship.

==== 1997 ====
Eight-year-old Sandpit continued to perform at top levels in 1997. Although his win in the 1997 San Marcos Handicap at Santa Anita Park was the only one of seven starts, he ran second in the Santa Anita Handicap and Arlington Million Stakes, and on dirt he finished third in the Dubai World Cup and the Hollywood Gold Cup.

== Stud record ==
Sandpit was retired after the 1997 racing season and sent to stand at stud at Vinery Farm in Lexington, Kentucky, where he was also shuttled to Australia for four Southern Hemisphere breeding seasons. He remained at Vinery until 2003, when he was sent to stand at Spendthrift Farm. On September 4, fourteen-year-old Sandpit died at the Hagyard-Davidson-McGee equine clinic near Lexington as a result of liver disease and a cancerous tumor. His progeny met with modest success in racing.

In 2007, Sandpit was selected as one of the five horses to be voted on in a Brazilian national poll as best turf horse in the history of that country.
