= United Nations Stakes =

- Class: Grade II
- Location: Monmouth Park Racetrack; Oceanport, New Jersey, USA
- Inaugurated: 1953 (as The United Nations Handicap at Atlantic City Race Course)
- Race type: Thoroughbred – Flat racing
- Website: Monmouth Park Racetrack

Race information
- Distance: 1 3/8 miles
- Surface: Turf
- Track: Left-handed
- Qualification: Three-year-olds & older
- Weight: 124 lbs. with allowances
- Purse: $600,000 (2022)

The United Nations Stakes is a Grade II American Thoroughbred horse race for three-year-olds and older run over a distance of one and three-eighth miles on the turf held annually in July at Monmouth Park Racetrack in Oceanport, New Jersey. The event currently offers a purse of $600,000.

== History ==
The inaugural running of the event was on 26 September 1953 at the Atlantic City Race Course in Mays Landing, New Jersey as an Invitational handicap event, The United Nations Handicap over the distance of 1 3/16 miles. The event was named after the intergovernmental organization United Nations with the idea to promote the internationalization of the sport of horse racing whereby foreign horses bred, owned and trained would compete against each other in the US. The event attracted eight entries - four were foreign bred, including the English-bred Royal Vale and Stan, Chilean-bred Iceberg II, Irish-bred Olympic View and the others were US Bred. The first running was won in track record time of 1:55 4/5 by Iceberg II, who was trained by future U.S. Racing Hall of Fame inductee Horatio Luro and ridden by Jorge Contreras. Later Iceberg II would be enthroned as US Champion Male Turf Horse for 1953.

Within the first few years the event with its impressive stakes gave turf racing a spotlight. After his victory in 1956, Career Boy's owner Cornelius Vanderbilt Whitney then decided to send his top two runners to run in the prestigious Prix de l'Arc de Triomphe at Longchamp Racecourse in Paris, France. Entered with stablemate Fisherman and with Eddie Arcaro riding, Career Boy finished fourth in the 1956 Arc to Ribot. Career Boy's 1956 performances earned him US Champion Male Turf Horse honors.

In 1957 the event was won by Round Table which was his eighth straight victory in the midst of an eleven race winning streak that landed him US Champion Male Turf Horse honors. In 1958 a crowd of 26,444 witnessed a masterful ride by the future U.S. Racing Hall of Fame jockey Bill Shoemaker who rode Clem to a new course record in 1:54 3/5 to a half length victory over Round Table who carried 130 pounds. This was the first defeat on the turf track by Round Table. Nonetheless, Round Table was crowned US Horse of the Year in 1958 even though Clem had defeated him three times during the year. In the 1959 renewal of the event Round Table was assigned a top weight of 136 pounds giving 14 to 22 pounds to his nine rivals. Round Table won the event becoming the first two time winner of the event.

By early 1960s the event had become as a logical and natural place for international and top US turf runners to prepare for the Washington D.C. International which was considered as the forerunner to the Breeders' Cup Turf and the championship long distance turf race. The event was held in September and with NYRA holding the Man o' War Stakes in late October or early November the path to the Washington D.C. International was clear. Although the 1960 winner T.V. Lark did not run in the Washington D.C. International, he did manage to go on as a four-year-old and win that event the following year. The 1962 and 1963 winner Mongo also went on to win the prestigious Washington D.C. International and captured US Champion Male Turf Horse honors.

From 1963 to 1971 the event had a profound bearing on who would be crowned US Champion Male Turf Horse. The 1964 US Champion Male Turf Horse, Irish-bred Turbo Jet II finished third to Western Warrior in the event, but the following start he was victorious in the Man o' War Stakes. The 1964 second place finisher and 1965 winner Parka was crowned US Champion Male Turf Horse. The 1966 winner Assagai would also win the Man o' War Stakes was crowned US Champion Male Turf Horse. Assagai was also second to 1967 longshot winner Flit-to, and third was Fort Marcy who eventually was voted 1967 US Champion Male Turf Horse. Fort Marcy would run four times in the event finishing third three times before finally winning the event in 1970. However, Fort Marcy was not disgraced in defeat. The 1968 winner Dr. Fager who defeated Advocator and Australian champion Tobin Bronze was crowned US Horse of the Year and the 1969 winner, the South African-bred Hawaii was chosen as US Champion Male Turf Horse. In 1970 Fort Marcy won the United Nations Handicap, four weeks later won the Man o' War Stakes at Belmont Park and in early November captured the Washington D.C. International for the second time and was crowned 1970 US Horse of the Year. The 1971 winner Run the Gantlet won the event on the soft track and in October also won the Man o' War Stakes and continued on to win the Washington D.C. International by six lengths. Run the Gantlet's 1971 performances earned him American Champion Male Turf Horse honors.

In 1973 when The American Graded Stakes Committee was founded by the Thoroughbred Owners and Breeders Association the event was immediately given the highest classification of Grade I. By the 1980s the event was scheduled to be run in summer usually in late July or August.

Through the 1970s and 1980s the event produced notable winners. The 1974 winner Halo went on to become twice the Leading sire in North America in the 1980s. The 1978 winner, the English-bred Noble Dancer II was superbly ridden by U. S. Triple Crown winning jockey Steve Cauthen by six lengths which continues to be the largest margin of victory in the event. Noble Dancer II became the third horse to be a dual winner of the event in 1979.

Entering the Breeders' Cup era the event continued to be a notable preparatory event. The 1986 winner as a three-year-old, Manila followed with wins in the Grade I Turf Classic at Belmont Park and Grade I Breeders' Cup Turf at Santa Anita Park and was crowned US Champion Male Turf Horse.

From 1990 through 1997, the event was known as the Caesars International Handicap with sponsorship from Caesars Atlantic City. From 1990 to 1993 the event held a Grade II classification. The 1989 US Champion Male Turf Horse, the English-bred Steinlen set a new track record in 1990 winning in 1:52 flat.

The Canadian-bred Sky Classic won the 1992 renewal and which culminated in him winning US Champion Male Turf Horse honors. Duel Breeders' Cup Mile winner Lure proved that he could also win at a longer distance in 1994. While the Brazilian three-year-old champion from 1992, Sandpit would become the fifth horse to win the event twice in 1996.

With the economic deterioration of the Atlantic City Race Course the event was not held in 1998 in a shortened meeting.

In 1999, the event was moved to Monmouth Park and run over a longer distance of 1 3/8 miles. The event was continued to be well supported stakes reaching $750,000 in 2003. In 2004 the conditions of the event were changed from handicap to stakes allowance and the name of the event was modified to the United Nations Stakes.

Notable winners in the 2000s include 2004 Breeders' Cup Turf winner Better Talk Now winning the event in 2005. English Channel won the event for the second time in 2007. He continued his excellent form and captured the GI Joe Hirsch Turf Classic Invitational Stakes and the Breeders' Cup Turf by 7 lengths at Monmouth Park. English Channel was voted US Champion Male Turf Horse for 2007.

Kenneth and Sarah Ramsey's Big Blue Kitten was the eighth horse to win this event twice in 2015. Big Blue Kitten continued his fine form winning the G1 Joe Hirsch Turf Classic Stakes Those victories were key in Big Blue Kitten being chosen US Champion Male Turf Horse in 2015.

After many years being scheduled close to July 4 weekend, the event is now part of the Haskell Stakes race day card.

In 2024 the event was downgraded by the Thoroughbred Owners and Breeders Association to Grade II status.

== Records ==
Time record:

- 1 3/8 miles – 2:10.81 Bigger Picture (2017) (Track record)
- 1 3/16 miles – 1:52.00 Steinlen (GB) (1990)

Margins:

- 6 lengths – Noble Dancer II (GB) (1978)

Most wins by a jockey:

- 5 – Joe Bravo (2012, 2013, 2015, 2017, 2020)

Most wins by a trainer:

- 7 – Chad C. Brown (2013, 2015, 2018, 2021, 2022, 2025, 2026)

Most wins by an owner:

- 4 – Rokeby Stables (1970, 1971, 1981, 1984)

Most wins:

- 2 – Round Table (1957, 1959)
- 2 – Mongo (1962, 1963)
- 2 – Noble Dancer II (GB) (1978, 1979)
- 2 – Manila (1986, 1987)
- 2 – Sandpit (BRZ) (1995, 1996)
- 2 – English Channel (2006, 2007)
- 2 – Presious Passion (2008, 2009)
- 2 – Big Blue Kitten (2013, 2015)

== Winners ==
Year	Winner	Age	Jockey	Trainer	Owner	Distance	Time	Purse	Grade	Ref
At Monmouth Park – United Nations Stakes
2026	Program Trading (GB)	6	Flavien Prat	Chad C. Brown	Klaravich Stables	1 3/8 miles	2:19.77	$500,000	II	
2025	Redistricting (GB)	5	Flavien Prat	Chad C. Brown	Klaravich Stables	1 3/8 miles	2:13.75	$612,000	II	
2024	Get Smokin	7	Fernando De La Cruz	Mark E. Casse	Ironhorse Racing Stable, BlackRidge Stables, Saratoga Seven Racing & T-N-T Equine Holdings	1 3/8 miles	2:12.57	$624,000	II	
2023	Therapist	8	Javier Castellano	Michael J. Maker	Michael Dubb	1 3/8 miles	2:14.50	$612,000	I	
2022	Adhamo (IRE)	4	Flavien Prat	Chad C. Brown	Madaket Stables, Michael Dubb, & Louis Lazzinnaro	1 3/8 miles	2:12.68	$618,000	I	`
2021	Tribhuvan (FR)	5	Flavien Prat	Chad C. Brown	Michael Dubb, Madaket Stables, Wonder Stables & Michael J. Caruso	1 3/8 miles	2:15.48	$515,000	I	
2020	Aquaphobia	7	Joe Bravo	Michael J. Maker	Paradise Farms, David Staudacher, Hooties Racing & Skychai Racing	1 3/8 miles	2:12.63	$315,000	I	
2019	Hunter O'Riley	6	Paco Lopez	James J. Toner	Sean Shay & Michael J. Ryan	1 3/8 miles	2:17.10	$310,000	I	
2018	Funtastic	4	Antonio A. Gallardo	Chad C. Brown	Three Chimneys Farm	1 3/8 miles	2:12.36	$315,000	I	
2017	Bigger Picture	6	Joe Bravo	Michael J. Maker	Three Diamonds Farm	1 3/8 miles	2:10.81	$321,000	I	
2016	World Approval	4	Florent Geroux	Mark E. Casse	Live Oak Racing	1 3/8 miles	2:14.66	$327,000	I	
2015	Big Blue Kitten	7	Joe Bravo	Chad C. Brown	Kenneth & Sarah Ramsey	1 3/8 miles	2:11.82	$535,000	I	
2014	Main Sequence	5	Rajiv Maragh	H. Graham Motion	Flaxman Holdings	1 3/8 miles	2:14.23	$535,000	I	
2013	Big Blue Kitten	5	Joe Bravo	Chad C. Brown	Kenneth & Sarah Ramsey	1 3/8 miles	2:11.98	$525,000	I	
2012	Turbo Compressor	4	Joe Bravo	Todd A. Pletcher	P and G Stable & Off the Hook	1 3/8 miles	2:12.88	$505,000	I	
2011	Teaks North	4	Eddie Castro	Justin Sallusto	Jules Boutelle	1 3/8 miles	2:13.28	$765,000	I	
2010	Chinchon (IRE)	5	Garrett K. Gomez	Carlos Laffon-Parias	Darpat S. L. Stables	1 3/8 miles	2:11.77	$760,000	I	
2009	Presious Passion	6	Elvis Trujillo	Mary Hartmann	Patricia A. Generazio	1 3/8 miles	2:10.97	$750,000	I	
2008	Presious Passion	5	Eddie Castro	Mary Hartmann	Patricia A. Generazio	1 3/8 miles	2:13.88	$750,000	I	
2007	English Channel	5	John R. Velazquez	Todd A. Pletcher	James T. Scatuorchio	1 3/8 miles	2:12.89	$742,500	I	
2006	English Channel	4	John R. Velazquez	Todd A. Pletcher	James T. Scatuorchio	1 3/8 miles	2:13.24	$750,000	I	
2005	Better Talk Now	6	Ramon A. Dominguez	H. Graham Motion	Bushwood Stables	1 3/8 miles	2:20.57	$750,000	I	
2004	Request for Parole	5	Edgar S. Prado	Stanley M. Hough	Jeri & Sam Knighton	1 3/8 miles	2:13.37	$750,000	I	
United Nations Handicap
2003	Balto Star	5	Jose A. Velez Jr.	Todd A. Pletcher	Anstu Stable	1 3/8 miles	2:12.78	$750,000	I	
2002	With Anticipation	7	Pat Day	Jonathan E. Sheppard	Augustin Stable	1 3/8 miles	2:12.81	$500,000	I	
2001	† Senure	5	Robbie Davis	Robert J. Frankel	Juddmonte Farms	1 3/8 miles	2:13.56	$500,000	I	
2000	Down the Aisle	7	Robbie Davis	William I. Mott	Charles H. Deters	1 3/8 miles	2:13.63	$350,000	I	
1999	Yagli	6	Jerry D. Bailey	William I. Mott	Allen E. Paulson	1 3/8 miles	2:16.02	$250,000	I	
1998	Race not held									
At Atlantic City Race Course – Caesars International Handicap
1997	Influent	6	Jean-Luc Samyn	Howard M. Tesher	Richard Kumble & Michael Becker	1 3/16 miles	1:53.72	$380,000	I	
1996	Sandpit (BRZ)	7	Corey Nakatani	Richard E. Mandella	Sierra Thoroughbreds	1 3/16 miles	1:55.71	$500,000	I	
1995	Sandpit (BRZ)	6	Corey Nakatani	Richard E. Mandella	Sierra Thoroughbreds	1 3/16 miles	1:57.25	$500,000	I	
1994	Lure	5	Mike E. Smith	Claude R. McGaughey III	Claiborne Farm	1 3/16 miles	1:52.66	$490,000	I	
1993	Star of Cozzene	5	Jose A. Santos	Mark A. Hennig	Team Valor, John Amerman, John B. Porter, et al	1 3/16 miles	1:53.22	$500,000	II	
1992	Sky Classic	5	Pat Day	James E. Day	Sam-Son Farm	1 3/16 miles	1:52.53	$500,000	II	
1991	Exbourne	5	Chris McCarron	Robert J. Frankel	Juddmonte Farm	1 3/16 miles	1:52.75	$500,000	II	
1990	Steinlen (GB)	7	Jose A. Santos	D. Wayne Lukas	Daniel Wildenstein	1 3/16 miles	1:52.00	$500,000	II	
United Nations Handicap
1989	Yankee Affair	7	Pat Day	Henry L. Carroll	Ju Ju Gen Stable	1 3/16 miles	1:53.20	$200,000	I	
1988	Equalize	6	Jose A. Santos	Angel Penna Sr.	Alejandro Menditeguy	1 3/16 miles	1:53.60	$200,000	I	
1987	Manila	4	Jacinto Vasquez	LeRoy Jolley	Bradley M. Shannon	1 3/16 miles	1:58.80	$150,000	I	
1986	Manila	3	Jose A. Santos	LeRoy Jolley	Bradley M. Shannon	1 3/16 miles	1:52.60	$176,000	I	
1985	Ends Well	4	Michael R. Morgan	Robert J. Reinacher Jr.	Greentree Stable	1 3/16 miles	1:54.60	$150,000	I	
1984	Hero's Honor	4	Jerry D. Bailey	MacKenzie Miller	Rokeby Stables	1 3/16 miles	1:54.00	$180,000	I	
1983	Acaroid	5	Angel Cordero Jr.	Jan H. Nerud	Tartan Stable	1 3/16 miles	1:53.40	$150,000	I	
1982	Naskra's Breeze	5	Jean-Luc Samyn	Philip G. Johnson	Broadmoor Stable	1 3/16 miles	1:55.60	$150,000	I	
1981	Key to Content	4	George Martens	MacKenzie Miller	Rokeby Stables	1 3/16 miles	1:52.80	$150,000	I	
1980	Lyphard's Wish (FR)	4	Angel Cordero Jr.	Angel Penna Sr.	Daniel Wildenstein	1 3/16 miles	1:53.80	$150,000	I	
1979	Noble Dancer II (GB)	7	Jacinto Vasquez	Thomas J. Kelly	Haakon Fretheim	1 3/16 miles	1:56.40	$125,000	I	
1978	Noble Dancer II (GB)	6	Steve Cauthen	Thomas J. Kelly	Haakon Fretheim	1 3/16 miles	1:56.40	$125,000	I	
1977	Bemo	7	Don Brumfield	James W. Murphy	Hickory Tree Stable	1 3/16 miles	1:54.00	$100,000	I	
1976	Intrepid Hero	4	Sandy Hawley	John W. Russell	Ogden Mills Phipps	1 3/16 miles	1:53.40	$100,000	I	
1975	Royal Glint	5	Jorge Tejeira	Gordon R. Potter	Dan Lasater	1 3/16 miles	1:57.00	$100,000	I	
1974	Halo	5	Jorge Velásquez	MacKenzie Miller	Edward P. Taylor	1 3/16 miles	1:56.80	$100,000	I	
1973	Tentam	4	Jorge Velásquez	MacKenzie Miller	Edward P. Taylor	1 3/16 miles	1:54.60	$125,000	I	
1972	‡ Acclimatization	4	Carlos Barrera	Maurice Zilber	Nelson Bunker Hunt	1 3/16 miles	1:54.00	$100,000		
1971	Run The Gantlet	3	Robert Woodhouse	J. Elliott Burch	Rokeby Stables	1 3/16 miles	2:02.00	$100,000		
1970	Fort Marcy	6	Jorge Velásquez	J. Elliott Burch	Rokeby Stables	1 3/16 miles	1:56.00	$125,000		
1969	Hawaii (SAF)	5	Jorge Velásquez	MacKenzie Miller	Cragwood Stables	1 3/16 miles	2:00.60	$125,000		
1968	Dr. Fager	4	Braulio Baeza	John A. Nerud	Tartan Stable	1 3/16 miles	1:55.20	$100,000		
1967	Flit-to	4	Hedley Woodhouse	James P. Conway	Robert Lehman	1 3/16 miles	1:54.00	$100,000		
1966	Assagai	3	Larry Adams	MacKenzie Miller	Cragwood Stables	1 3/16 miles	1:58.60	$100,000		
1965	Parka	7	Walter Blum	Warren A. Croll Jr.	Pelican Stable (Rachel Carpenter)	1 3/16 miles	1:54.40	$125,000		
1964	Western Warrior	5	Heliodoro Gustines	John A. Nerud	Tartan Stable	1 3/16 miles	1:57.80	$125,000		
1963	Mongo	4	Wayne Chambers	Frank A. Bonsal	Marion duPont Scott	1 3/16 miles	1:54.40	$125,000		
1962	Mongo	3	Charlie Burr	Frank A. Bonsal	Marion duPont Scott	1 3/16 miles	1:56.60	$100,000		
1961	Oink	4	Larry Gilligan	Steve Ippolito	Jacnot Stable	1 3/16 miles	1:56.00	$100,000		
1960	T. V. Lark	3	Johnny Sellers	Paul K. Parker	Preston W. Madden	1 3/16 miles	1:57.00	$100,000		
1959	Round Table	5	Bill Shoemaker	William Molter	Kerr Stable	1 3/16 miles	1:55.20	$100,000		
1958	Clem	4	Bill Shoemaker	William W. Stephens	Adele L. Rand	1 3/16 miles	1:54.60	$100,000		
1957	Round Table	3	Bill Shoemaker	William Molter	Kerr Stable	1 3/16 miles	1:56.20	$100,000		
1956	Career Boy	3	Sam Boulmetis Sr.	Sylvester Veitch	Cornelius Vanderbilt Whitney	1 3/16 miles	1:56.20	$100,000		
1955	Blue Choir (GB)	4	Bill Hartack	Buster Lilly	Mrs. Mary L. Nathenson	1 3/16 miles	2:00.00	$104,600		
1954	Closed Door	5	Bill Hartack	Sidney Jacobs	Jaclyn Stable	1 3/16 miles	1:57.00	$67,500		
1953	Iceberg II (CHI)	5	Jorge Contreras	Horatio Luro	W. Arnold Hanger	1 3/16 miles	1:55.80	$60,550		

Notes:
‡ Ran as a part of a field entry
† In the running of the event in 2001, With Anticipation finished first but after taking the lead in the upper stretch then drifted outward under left handed pressure impeding the progress of Senure, the second place finisher. After a stewards inquiry and a subsequent claim of foul, the stewards disqualified With Anticipation and placed him second. Senure was declared the winner.

== See also ==
- United Nations Stakes top three finishers and starters
- List of American and Canadian Graded races
