= Star of Cozzene =

American Thoroughbred racehorse

- Sire: Cozzene
- Grandsire: Caro
- Dam: Star Gem
- Damsire: Pia Star
- Sex: Stallion
- Foaled: 1988
- Country: United States
- Colour: Dark Bay
- Breeder: Double J Farm
- Owner: 1) Clover Racing Stables; 2) Team Valor; 3) Tomaeato Farm (9/1993)
- Trainer: 1) D. Wayne Lukas, 2) Mark A. Hennig
- Record: 37: 14-8-5
- Earnings: US$$2,308,923

Major wins
- Kelso Handicap (1991); Arlington Million (1993); Caesars International Handicap (1993); San Gabriel Handicap (1993); Manhattan Handicap (1993); Man o' War Stakes (1993); San Marcos Stakes (1993)
- Last updated on March 22, 2010

Star of Cozzene (foaled 1988 in Kentucky - February 5, 2013) was an American Thoroughbred racehorse who won on both dirt and turf.

A descendant of Nearco through both his sire and his dam, he won the 1991 Kelso Handicap at New York's Belmont Park. With Pat Day riding–and with a big late run from off-the-pace, he finished a fast-closing narrowly beaten third in the Breeders' Cup Mile, behind Opening Verse.

In 1992, his owners, Clover Racing Stables, sent him to trainer François Boutin to race in France and England. There, his best result in five starts was a second in the Group 3 Prix du Chemin de Fer du Nord at Chantilly Racecourse. In September, Star of Cozzene returned to race once in the United States, finishing ninth in the Arlington Million.

The following year, under owner Team Valor, trainer Mark Henning and jockey Jose Santos, five-year-old Star of Cozzene had his best year in racing. He won six events, including the Arlington Million, Manhattan Handicap, Caesars International, Man o' War Stakes. In three races in late 1992 and early 1993, he defeated 1993 American Horse of the Year Kotashaan .

In late September 1993, he was sold for $3 million to Tomaeato Farm, owners of breeding farms in Japan. Star of Cozzene was retired from racing in August 1994 with earnings in excess of US$2.3 million. He was sent to stand at stud in Japan.
