= Charles E. Burr =

American jockey (1934–2008)

Charlie Burr
Personal information
- Born: May 14, 1934 Arkansas City, Kansas, United States
- Died: September 16, 2008 (aged 74)
- Occupation: Jockey

Horse racing career
- Sport: Horse racing
- Career wins: Not found

Major racing wins
- Betsy Ross Stakes (1952); Black-Eyed Susan Stakes (1953); Stars and Stripes Turf Handicap (1957); Continental Turf Handicap (1958); Black Helen Handicap (1959); Astoria Stakes (1960); Lexington Handicap (1962); Trenton Handicap (1962); United Nations Handicap (1962); Ventnor Turf Handicap (1962); Arkansas Derby (1964)

Racing awards
- United States Champion Jockey by wins (1951); Leading jockey at Gulfstream Park (1953, 1957)

Significant horses
- Mongo, Ram o' War, Sky Wonder

Charles E. "Charlie" Burr (May 14, 1934 – September 16, 2008) was an American National Champion Thoroughbred horse racing jockey. In 1951, he became the seventh jockey in American Thoroughbred racing history to ride 300 or more winners in a single year.

== Early career ==
Charlie Burr was raised on a farm at Arkansas City, Kansas, where he learned to ride horses at an early age. By age eleven he was competing and winning Quarter-Horse races. He rode for his uncle, Clarence ("Shorty") Burr, in races in his native Kansas as well as in Missouri, Oklahoma, and Texas. He rode professionally for twenty-nine years at Thoroughbred racetracks in New York, the Mid-Atlantic States, as well as the South Florida metropolitan area.

== Achievements ==
In 1951, Charlie Burr led all American jockeys with 310 wins. That Championship year included fourteen times when he won four or more races on a single racecard including three of which he had five wins. In 1953, he won six races on a single racecard at Gulfstream Park in Hallandale Beach, Florida, a record that stood for forty-two years. That same year he won the first of his two Gulfstream Park riding titles. Among Burr's major race wins, in 1958 he won the Continental Turf Handicap at Washington Park Race Track aboard Ada L. Rice's Hoop Band in a time that equaled the American record for six furlongs. In 1962, Burr rode Mongo to wins in the Trenton Handicap at Garden State Park Racetrack, the United Nations Handicap at Atlantic City Race Course and the Lexington Handicap at Aqueduct Racetrack. As well, Charlie Burr had two mounts in the Preakness Stakes, the second leg of the U.S. Triple Crown series. He ran fourth in 1953 aboard Ram o' War and was fifth in 1963 on Sky Wonder.

== Injury ==
An accident while exercising a horse at Maryland's Bowie Race Track left Burr partially paralyzed and he would need a wheelchair for the next twenty-six years until he became bedridden in 2006. Burr remained good friends with the 1973 U.S. Triple Crown winning-jockey Ron Turcotte who also needed to use a wheelchair since 1978 as a result of a racing accident.

Charlie Burr died on September 16, 2008, in Arkansas City at age 74. He was survived by his wife Mildred whom he met while racing in her hometown of Baltimore, Maryland.
