= Bacchanal (horse) =

Irish-bred Thoroughbred racehorse

- Sire: Bob Back
- Grandsire: Roberto
- Dam: Justitia
- Damsire: Dunbeath
- Sex: Gelding
- Foaled: 4 March 1994
- Country: Ireland
- Colour: Chestnut
- Breeder: Martyn J McEnery
- Owner: Lady Lloyd-Webber
- Trainer: Nicky Henderson
- Record: 20: 10-2-2
- Earnings: £262,798

Major wins
- Gerry Feilden Hurdle (1999); Stayers' Hurdle (2000); Feltham Novices' Chase (2000); Reynoldstown Novices' Chase (2001); Aon Chase (2002); Long Distance Hurdle (2002)

Bacchanal (4 March 1994 – 25 January 2003) was an Irish-bred, British-trained Thoroughbred racehorse who competed in National Hunt racing. He was lightly raced, winning ten of his twenty races between January 1999 and January 2003. As a novice hurdler he won two of his four races and in the following season he won the Gerry Feilden Hurdle before recording his biggest win in the Stayers' Hurdle. He later developed into a top class steeplechaser, winning the Feltham Novices' Chase, Reynoldstown Novices' Chase and Aon Chase and twice finishing third in the King George VI Chase. He returned to hurdles to win the Long Distance Hurdle in 2002, but was killed in a fall at Cheltenham in January 2003.

== Background ==
Bacchanal was a chestnut gelding with a large white star, bred in Ireland by Martyn J McEnery's Rossenarra Stud. He was sired by Bob Back, who recorded his most notable success when beating Pebbles and Commanche Run in the Prince of Wales's Stakes in 1985. As a breeding stallion he sire the St Leger winner Bob's Return but is best known for his National Hunt runners, which have included Bobs Worth and Back In Front. His dam, Justitia, was an unraced daughter of the William Hill Futurity winner Dunbeath.

In October 1995, the yearling was sent to the Goffs sale and was bought for IR£12,5000 by Charles Gordon-Watson. The gelding entered the ownership of Lady Lloyd-Webber and was sent into training with Nicky Henderson at Lambourn in Berkshire. Bacchanal was ridden in most of his races by Mick Fitzgerald.

== Racing career ==
=== 1998/1999 National Hunt season: novice hurdles ===
Bacchanal began his racing career in January 1999 in a novice hurdle at Huntingdon Racecourse in which he finished second to Tonoco. He recorded his first success at Sandown Park Racecourse a month later, beating Lordberniebouffant by eleven lengths at odds of 13/8 and followed up with a twenty-three length win over Davoski at Chepstow Racecourse in March. He was moved up in class for the Grade 1 Champion Novice Hurdle at Punchestown Racecourse in April but finished last of five behind the odds-on favourite Cardinal Hill.

=== 1999/2000 National Hunt season: hurdles ===
On his first appearance of the 1999/2000 National Hunt season Bacchanal started favourite for the Gerry Feilden Hurdle at Newbury Racecourse on 27 November in which he was opposed by the Sharp Novices' Hurdle winner Silence Reigns. He did not jump well and appeared to be under pressure from the third last, but stayed on to take the lead on the run-in and won by three quarters of a length from Hit And Run. After racing exclusively over distances of around two miles, Bacchanal was stepped up in trip (and class) for the Grade 1 Cleeve Hurdle over two miles five and a half furlongs at Cheltenham Racecourse in January. He led in the early stages but lost his position and looked beaten before staying on again and failing by only a neck to catch the mare Lady Rebecca.

On 16 March 2000, Bacchanal ran for the first time at the Cheltenham Festival where he contested the Stayers' Hurdle. He was made the 11/2 third choice in the betting behind Lady Rebecca and the Irish gelding Limestone Lad who had beaten Istabraq in the Hatton's Grace Hurdle. The other contenders included Behrajan (Tolworth Hurdle), Mister Morose (Silver Trophy Handicap Hurdle, November Novices' Chase), Galant Moss (Liverpool Hurdle) and Silver Wedge (Tolworth Hurdle, Long Walk Hurdle, West Yorkshire Hurdle). Mick Fitzgerald positioned the gelding in second place behind Limestone Lad, with Silver Wedge also close to the lead. Bacchanal overtook Limestone Lad after the second last, survived a poor jump at the final flight, and despite hanging abruptly to the right on the run-in, stayed on to win by a length, with a gap of three lengths back to Behrajan in third. After the race, Henderson praised the efforts of Yogi Breisner in helping the horse's jumping and said "I find this quite amazing as I always thought he wanted a bog, but he's always been a horse with huge potential and I'm thrilled with him".

For the second year in succession, Bacchanal ran poorly at Punchestown in April, finishing fourth behind Rubhahunish when favourite for the Champion Stayers Hurdle.

=== 2000/2001 National Hunt season: novice chases ===
In the 2000/2001 National Hunt season Bacchanal was campaigned in novice steeplechases. On his debut over the larger obstacles he won the Fulke Walwyn Chase at Newbury, taking the lead at the fourth last and winning by eighteen lengths from Wahiba Sands. At Kempton Park Racecourse in December he was stepped up in class for the Grade 1 Feltham Novices' Chase over three miles. He started the 9/4 second favourite behind the Paul Nicholls-trained Shotgun Willy, who had won his last six races whilst the other three runners were Crocadee (Henry VIII Novices' Chase), Bindaree and Take Control (later to win the Scottish Grand National). Bacchanal disputed the lead for most of the way and was left in front with a big advantage when Crocadee fell at the second last. He won by more than thirty lengths from Take Control with a gap of twenty-one lengths back to Shotgun Willy in third.

At Ascot in February he started 4/11 favourite for the Grade 2 Reynoldstown Novices' Chase and won by thirteen lengths from Bindaree after taking the lead at the thirteenth of the twenty fences. Bacchanal failed to add to his tally in spring, falling at the first fence in the Mildmay Novices' Chase at Aintree Racecourse on 6 April. That year's Cheltenham Festival had been cancelled as a result of 2001 United Kingdom foot-and-mouth outbreak and a series of substitute championship races were run at Sandown Park Racecourse at the end of April. Bacchanal returned to hurdling for the Distance Championship Hurdle (a substitute for the Stayers' Hurdle) but finished tenth of the eleven runners behind Baracouda.

=== 2001/2002 National Hunt season: chases ===
Bacchanal began his fourth season at Sandown in December when he started 4/9 favourite against two opponents and won by twenty-six lengths from Granit d'Estruval. At the end of the month he was moved up to the highest class for the King George VI Chase at Kempton on Boxing Day and finished third behind Florida Pearl and Best Mate with the favourite First Gold twenty-six lengths back in third. At Newbury on 9 February, Bacchanal started 5/4 favourite for the Listed Aon Chase. He took the lead at the fourth last and won by twelve lengths and a neck from Shotgun Willy and Marlborough (winner of the Gold Cup substitute race in April 2001). The other beaten horses included Take Control, Supreme Glory (Welsh National) and What's Up Boys (Hennessy Gold Cup).

On 14 March, Bacchanal started 6/1 second favourite behind Looks Like Trouble for the 2002 Cheltenham Gold Cup. He was in touch with the leaders in the early stages but began to struggle at the fifth last and faded to come home twelfth of the thirteen finishers behind Best Mate.

=== 2002/2003 National Hunt season: chases ===
On his first appearance of the next season, Bacchanal returned to the smaller obstacles for the Long Distance Hurdle over three miles at Newbury on 30 November and started 7/2 third favourite behind Deano's Beeno who had won two of the last three runnings of the race and the West Yorkshire Hurdle winner Brother Joe. Despite repeatedly jumping to the right, he led for most of the way and stayed on in the closing stages to win by five lengths and three lengths from Native Emperor and Deano's Beano. In December, Bacchanal moved back to fences and started 100/30 second favourite as he made his second attempt to win the King George VI Chase. He led in the early stages and was in contention for most of the race before finishing third behind Best Mate and Marlborough. On 25 January, Bacchanal started 3/1 favourite for the Pillar Property Chase at Cheltenham in which he wore blinkers for the first time. After racing in second place behind the eventual winner Behrajan, he was fatally injured when falling at the eighth fence.

After Bacchanal's death, Nicky Henderson said "It was just awful. The frustrating thing was the way he was travelling and jumping in the blinkers, it looked as if we'd found the answer. He was as good as gold. We think it happened as he was taking off and not as a result of the fall. It's desperate. The place is like a morgue today". The Lloyd-Webbers' racing manager described Bacchanal as "a very special friend... it's devastating that this should happen. He was a very popular horse with quite a following. It's very difficult to put into words how one feels but you just take the memories with you".

== Pedigree ==
Pedigree of Bacchanal (IRE), chestnut gelding, 1994
Sire Bob Back (USA) 1981	Roberto (USA); 1969	Hail to Reason	Turn-To
Sire Bob Back (USA) 1981	Roberto (USA); 1969	Hail to Reason	Nothirdchance
Sire Bob Back (USA) 1981	Roberto (USA); 1969	Bramalea	Nashua
Sire Bob Back (USA) 1981	Roberto (USA); 1969	Bramalea	Rarelea
Sire Bob Back (USA) 1981	Toter Back (USA); 1967	Carry Back	Saggy
Sire Bob Back (USA) 1981	Toter Back (USA); 1967	Carry Back	Joppy
Sire Bob Back (USA) 1981	Toter Back (USA); 1967	Romantic Miss	Beauchef
Sire Bob Back (USA) 1981	Toter Back (USA); 1967	Romantic Miss	Roman Zephyr
Dam Justitia (GB) 1987	Dunbeath (USA); 1980	Grey Dawn	Herbager
Dam Justitia (GB) 1987	Dunbeath (USA); 1980	Grey Dawn	Polamia
Dam Justitia (GB) 1987	Dunbeath (USA); 1980	Priceless Fame	Irish Castle
Dam Justitia (GB) 1987	Dunbeath (USA); 1980	Priceless Fame	Comely Nell
Dam Justitia (GB) 1987	Royal Yacht (USA); 1981	Riverman	Never Bend
Dam Justitia (GB) 1987	Royal Yacht (USA); 1981	Riverman	River Lady
Dam Justitia (GB) 1987	Royal Yacht (USA); 1981	Regal Style	Cornish Prince
Dam Justitia (GB) 1987	Royal Yacht (USA); 1981	Regal Style	Capelet (Family:5-g)
