= 1961 Kentucky Derby =

Horse race

87th Kentucky Derby
- Kentucky Derby
- Grade I stakes race
- Location: Churchill Downs
- Date: May 6, 1961
- Winning horse: Carry Back
- Jockey: Johnny Sellers
- Trainer: Jack Price
- Owner: Katherine Price
- Surface: Dirt

The 1961 Kentucky Derby was the 87th running of the Kentucky Derby. The race took place on May 6, 1961.

== Full results ==
Finished	Post	Horse	Jockey	Trainer	Owner	Time / behind
1st	10	Carry Back	Johnny Sellers	Jack Price	Katherine Price	
2nd	8	Crozier	Braulio Baeza	Charles R. Parke	Fred W. Hooper	
3rd	14	Bass Clef	Ronald Baldwin	Anthony W. Rupelt	Mrs. V. E. Smith	
4th	11	Dr. Miller	Bill Shoemaker	John Jacobs	Ethel D. Jacobs	
5th	4	Sherluck	Eddie Arcaro	Harold Young	Jacob Sher	
6th	6	Globemaster	John L. Rotz	Thomas Joseph Kelly	Leonard P. Sasso	
7th	1	Four-and-Twenty	Johnny Longden	Vance Longden	Alberta Ranches, Ltd.	
8th	1A	Flutterby	Henry Moreno	Vance Longden	Alberta Ranches, Ltd.	
9th	5	Loyal Son	Lawrence Hansman	Thomas H. Stevens	Eastwood Stable	
10th	4	On His Metal	Douglas Dodson	Chester F. Bowles	J. Graham Brown	
11th	9	Light Talk	Robert Nono	Steve Ippolito	Jacnot Stable	
12th	7	Ambiopoise	Bobby Ussery	Thomas Mercer Waller	Robert Lehman	
13th	12	Ronnie's Ace	Alexander Maese	Carlton A. Roles	Clark-Radkovich	
14th	2	Dearborn	Bill Phelps	Robert C. Steele	E. A. Dust	
15th	13	Jay Fox	Larry Gilligan	James W. Smith	Brae Burn Farm	
