= Bob's Return =

Irish-bred Thoroughbred racehorse

- Sire: Bob Back
- Grandsire: Roberto
- Dam: Quality of Life
- Damsire: Auction Ring
- Sex: Stallion
- Foaled: 5 March 1990
- Country: Ireland
- Colour: Brown
- Breeder: Baronrath Stud
- Owner: Mrs G A E Smith
- Trainer: Mark Tompkins
- Record: 15: 5-2-0
- Earnings: £537,884

Major wins
- Zetland Stakes (1992); Lingfield Derby Trial (1993); Great Voltigeur Stakes (1993); St. Leger Stakes (1993)

Bob's Return (1990–2008), was an Irish-bred, British-trained Thoroughbred racehorse and sire. In a career which lasted from June 1992 until September 1994, he ran fifteen times and won five races. He recorded his most important success when winning the Classic St. Leger Stakes as a three-year-old in 1993, the same year in which he won the Lingfield Derby Trial and the Great Voltigeur Stakes. In the following season he failed to win in six races, although he finished second in the Eclipse Stakes. He later had some success as a sire of National Hunt winners.

== Background ==
Bob's Return was a dark brown horse with a small white star bred by the Baronrath stud at Straffan in County Kildare. In colouring and markings, he closely resembled his sire Bob Back, who defeated Pebbles at Royal Ascot in 1985, and was a successful sire of both flat racers and jumpers. Bob's Return was the first foal of his dam, Quality of Life, and was described as being "unfashionably bred". He was sent as a yearling to the Goffs sales in October 1991, where he was bought for IR£14,500 by Mark Tompkins who trained him at his Flint Cottage stables. The colt was bought by Mr G. A. E. Smith and given as a present to wis wife Jackie, in whose colours he ran during his racing career. Bob's Return, who usually raced in a sheepskin noseband, was ridden in every one of his fifteen races by Philip Robinson.

== Racing career ==
=== 1992: two-year-old season ===
Bob's Return made his racecourse debut in a five furlong maiden race at Beverley in June 1992 in which he finished fourth behind Rock Symphony. He missed the next three months before starting 9/4 favourite for a maiden race at Yarmouth. He finished fourth of the sixteen runners behind Racing Telegraph. In October, Bob's Return was sent to Pontefract and recorded his first victory, winning by a length from Brown's and nineteen others. On his final race of the season, Bob's Return was moved up in class and sent to Newmarket to contest the Listed Zetland Stakes. He led from the start and won by three quarters of a length from Bobbie Dee.

=== 1993: three-year-old season ===
Bob's Return began his three-year-old season in the Derby Trial at Lingfield Park Racecourse on 8 May. Robinson took Bob's Return to the lead early on, and the colt went clear in the straight before staying on to win by a neck from Tioman Island at odds of 14/1.

Bob's Return made his next appearance in the Derby at Epsom for which he was made the 15/1 fifth choice in the betting in a field of sixteen colts. He led the field into the straight but weakened in the closing stages and finished sixth, fourteen lengths behind the winner Commander in Chief. Bob's Return was off the course for two and a half months before reappearing in the Great Voltigeur Stakes at York Racecourse in August. Although he started a 16/1 outsider he was always among the leaders before taking the lead in the straight and drawing clear of his opponents to win by six lengths from Foresee.

In the Coalite-sponsored St Leger at Doncaster Racecourse on 11 September, Bob's Return started 3/1 favourite ahead of the Henry Cecil-trained Armiger. Robinson tracked the leaders, before moving the favourite into the lead three furlongs from the finish. Bob's Return stayed on strongly in the straight to win by three and a half lengths from Armiger. On his final race of the season, Bob's Return was dropped back in distance to contest the Prix de l'Arc de Triomphe at Longchamp. He briefly led the field in the straight but was outpaced in the closing stages and finished sixth, beaten four lengths behind the winner Urban Sea. Bob's Return was the highest rated European three-year-old at distances of fourteen furlongs and above.

=== 1994: four-year-old season ===
Bob's Return ran six times as a four-year-old without success, beginning with a fourth place behind Romildo in the Prix Ganay. He showed improved form in his next two races, finishing second in the Hardwicke Stakes at Royal Ascot and second to Ezzoud in the Eclipse stakes at Sandown. His remaining starts were disappointing as he finished unplaced in the King George VI and Queen Elizabeth Stakes, the International Stakes and the Irish St. Leger.

== Stud career ==
Bob's Return retired to stand at stud in Britain at a fee of £2,250. The Independent described his "bargain basement" fee as being a reflection of the unfashionable status of proven stayers as stallions. He attracted few mares and was transferred to the Kilbarry Lodge Stud in County Waterford in Ireland where he proved more popular. He sired few flat winners, but was more successful as a National Hunt stallion. His most successful offspring was the Irish steeplechaser Joncol, winner of the Hennessy Gold Cup (Ireland) and the John Durkan Memorial Punchestown Chase. Bob's Return died in 2008.

== Pedigree ==
Pedigree of Bob's Return (IRE), brown stallion, 1990
Sire Bob Back (USA) 1981	Roberto (USA); 1969	Hail to Reason	Turn-To
Sire Bob Back (USA) 1981	Roberto (USA); 1969	Hail to Reason	Nothirdchance
Sire Bob Back (USA) 1981	Roberto (USA); 1969	Bramalea	Nashua
Sire Bob Back (USA) 1981	Roberto (USA); 1969	Bramalea	Rarelea
Sire Bob Back (USA) 1981	Toter Back (USA); 1967	Carry Back	Saggy
Sire Bob Back (USA) 1981	Toter Back (USA); 1967	Carry Back	Joppy
Sire Bob Back (USA) 1981	Toter Back (USA); 1967	Romantic Miss	Beauchef
Sire Bob Back (USA) 1981	Toter Back (USA); 1967	Romantic Miss	Roman Zephyr
Dam Quality of Life (IRE) 1985	Auction Ring (USA); 1972	Bold Bidder	Bold Ruler
Dam Quality of Life (IRE) 1985	Auction Ring (USA); 1972	Bold Bidder	High Bid
Dam Quality of Life (IRE) 1985	Auction Ring (USA); 1972	Hooplah	Hillary
Dam Quality of Life (IRE) 1985	Auction Ring (USA); 1972	Hooplah	Beadah
Dam Quality of Life (IRE) 1985	Flirting Countess (GB); 1975	Ridan	Nantallah
Dam Quality of Life (IRE) 1985	Flirting Countess (GB); 1975	Ridan	Rough Shod
Dam Quality of Life (IRE) 1985	Flirting Countess (GB); 1975	Narrow Escape	Narrator
Dam Quality of Life (IRE) 1985	Flirting Countess (GB); 1975	Narrow Escape	Press Forward (Family:1-w)
