= Bolkonski (horse) =

Irish-bred Thoroughbred racehorse (b. 1972)

- Sire: Balidar
- Grandsire: Will Somers
- Dam: Perennial
- Damsire: Dante
- Sex: Stallion
- Foaled: 15 March 1972
- Country: Ireland
- Colour: Chestnut
- Breeder: Woodpark Stud
- Owner: Carlo d'Alessio
- Trainer: Sergio Cumani; Henry Cecil
- Record: 6:4-1-0 (incomplete)

Major wins
- Premio Tevere (1974); 2000 Guineas (1975); St James's Palace Stakes (1975); Sussex Stakes (1975)

Awards
- Timeform rating: 134
- Last updated on 15 June 2025

Bolkonski (foaled 15 March 1972) was an Irish-bred, British-trained Thoroughbred racehorse and sire. Originally trained in Italy, the colt moved to England for the 1975 season where he recorded an upset victory over Grundy in the classic 2000 Guineas at Newmarket Racecourse. He went on to win two other major British races over one mile, the St James's Palace Stakes at Ascot and the Sussex Stakes at Goodwood. At the end of the season he was retired to stud where he had limited success as a sire of winners.

== Background ==
Bolkonski was a small but powerfully-built chestnut horse with a white star and white socks on his hind feet, bred in Ireland by the Woodpark Stud. He was sired by Balidar, a British sprinter whose most important success came in France in 1970 when he won the Prix de l'Abbaye at Longchamp Racecourse. Apart from Bolkonski the most important of his offspring was the influential broodmare Balidaress. Bolkonski's dam Perennial won one minor race, but was a descendant of the broodmare Calluna, the ancestor of the St Leger winner Athens Wood and the Prix de l'Arc de Triomphe winner Tony Bin.

As a yearling, Bolkonski was offered for sale at Newmarket in December 1973. He was bought for 7,000 guineas by the Newmarket Bloodstock Agency, acting on behalf of the Italian lawyer Carlo d'Alessio. The colt was sent to race in Italy where he was trained by Sergio Cumani.

== Racing career ==
=== 1974: two-year-old season ===
In 1974 Bolkonski was one of the best two-year-old colts in Italy. In October he won the Group Two Premio Tevere at the Capannelle Racecourse at Rome by eight lengths. At the end of the season the colt was transferred to England where he joined the Marriott stable of Henry Cecil at Newmarket, Suffolk.

=== 1975: three-year-old season ===
On his first appearance for his new trainer, Bolkonski was entered in the Craven Stakes at Newmarket on 15 April. He finished second by four lengths, when attempting to concede four pounds to the No Alimony. Two weeks later Bolkonski ran in the 2000 Guineas over Newmarket's Rowley Mile course, where he was ridden by the Italian jockey Gianfranco Dettori. In a race which was delayed because of a protest by striking stable lads he started at odds of 33/1 in a field of twenty-four runners. The closing stages of the race devolved into a prolonged struggle between Bolkonski and the favourite Grundy, with the outsider prevailing by half a length. Grundy went on to win the Derby and the King George VI and Queen Elizabeth Diamond Stakes. Bolkonski's win made d'Alessio the first Italian to own the winner of a British classic since Edoardo Ginistrelli won the Derby and Oaks with Signorinetta in 1908. It was also the first of 25 British classic winners for Henry Cecil, who had previously won the 1973 Irish 1,000 Guineas with Cloonagh.

In June, Bolkonski was sent to Royal Ascot to contest the St James's Palace Stakes (then a Group Two race). Ridden as usual by Dettori, he started at odds of 4/5 and won from Royal Manacle. At Goodwood Racecourse in July he was matched against older horses and fillies for the first time in the Group One Sussex Stakes. He became extremely agitated before the race after being alarmed by a loose horse in the paddock but was nevertheless made favourite at odds of 1/2. He took the lead three furlongs from the finish and held on to win a three-way photo finish from Rose Bowl and the leading sprinter Lianga.

On his only subsequent appearance, Bolkonski ran very poorly when fourth of the five runners behind Rose Bowl in the Queen Elizabeth II Stakes at Ascot. Plans to move him up in distance for the ten furlong Champion Stakes at Newmarket in October were abandoned after a poor performance in a training gallop and the colt was retired from racing at the end of the season.

== Assessment ==
In 1975 the independent Timeform organisation awarded Bolkonski a rating of 134, three pounds behind the top-rated Grundy a colt he had defeated on their only meeting.

In their book, A Century of Champions, based on the Timeform rating system, John Randall and Tony Morris rated Bolkonski an "average" winner of the 2000 Guineas.

== Stud career ==
Bolkonski was retired from racing to become a breeding stallion at the Haras du Val Henry in Normandy. He had little success as a sire of winners, the best of his progeny being Glifahda, a filly who won several races over sprint distances including the Prix de Seine-et-Oise, Prix de Saint-Georges and Prix du Gros Chêne. He was also the sire of Restless Girl, who produced the Prix de Diane winner Restless Kara.

== Pedigree ==
Pedigree of Bolkonski (IRE), chestnut stallion, 1972
Sire Balidar (GB) 1966	Will Somers; 1955	Tudor Minstrel	Owen Tudor*
Sire Balidar (GB) 1966	Will Somers; 1955	Tudor Minstrel	Sansonnet
Sire Balidar (GB) 1966	Will Somers; 1955	Queen's Jest	Nearco*
Sire Balidar (GB) 1966	Will Somers; 1955	Queen's Jest	Mirth
Sire Balidar (GB) 1966	Violet Bank; 1960	The Phoenix	Chateau Bouscaut
Sire Balidar (GB) 1966	Violet Bank; 1960	The Phoenix	Fille de Poete
Sire Balidar (GB) 1966	Violet Bank; 1960	Leinster	Speckled Band
Sire Balidar (GB) 1966	Violet Bank; 1960	Leinster	Garryard
Dam Perennial (FR) 1955	Dante; 1942	Nearco*	Pharos*
Dam Perennial (FR) 1955	Dante; 1942	Nearco*	Nogara*
Dam Perennial (FR) 1955	Dante; 1942	Rosy Legend	Dark Legend
Dam Perennial (FR) 1955	Dante; 1942	Rosy Legend	Rosy Cheeks
Dam Perennial (FR) 1955	Cyphia (GB); 1949	Watling Street	Fairway
Dam Perennial (FR) 1955	Cyphia (GB); 1949	Watling Street	Ranai
Dam Perennial (FR) 1955	Cyphia (GB); 1949	Calluna	Hyperion*
Dam Perennial (FR) 1955	Cyphia (GB); 1949	Calluna	Campanula (Family:19-b)

* Bolkonski is inbred 4S x 3D to the stallion Nearco, meaning that he appears fourth generation on the sire side of his pedigree, and third generation on the dam side of his pedigree.

* Bolkonski is inbred 5S x 4D to the stallion Hyperion, meaning that he appears fifth generation (via Owen Tudor) on the sire side of his pedigree, and fourth generation on the dam side of his pedigree.
