= Lexington Stakes (NYRA) =

- Class: Discontinued stakes
- Location: Aqueduct Racetrack, Queens, New York (1961–1976); Belmont Park, Elmont, New York (1977–2007)
- Inaugurated: 1961
- Race type: Thoroughbred – Flat racing

Race information
- Distance: 1⅛ miles (9 furlongs)
- Surface: Turf
- Track: Left-handed
- Qualification: Three years old & up
- Purse: US$100,000

The Lexington Stakes was an American Thoroughbred horse race for three-year-old horses run between 1961 and 2007. A race on turf, the event was run at Aqueduct Racetrack in Queens, New York from inception through 1976 after which it was moved permanently to Belmont Park in Elmont, New York.

Contested at various middle distances, it was run as the Lexington Handicap from inception in 1961 through 1981.

Named for one of America's greatest race horses as well as foundation sires, Lexington (The Blind Hero of Woodburn), the former Graded stakes race finished classified as a Listed event and offered a purse of $100,000.

== Historical notes ==
The inaugural running of the Lexington Handicap took place on November 10, 1961 and was won by Milton Ritzenberg's Wise Ship. The race run at what would be the longest distance in its history at one and five-eighths miles.

In his first start in a stakes race, Mongo won the second edition of the Lexington in 1962 for the Montpelier stable of Marion duPont Scott from the prominent du Pont family. Mongo's win marked the beginning of a very successful career in which he won a number of top turf races including the prestigious Washington, D.C. International Stakes which led to being voted the 1963 American Champion Male Turf Horse.

The popularity of the Lexington with owners and trainers was such that it had to be run in two divisions in 1970, then four consecutive years from 1974 thru 1977. In 1982 it was again split into two divisions for what would prove to be the last time. The first division was won by Majesty's Prince while in the second part Royal Roberto was declared the winner after Dew Line was disqualified and set back to fifth.

The 1977 U.S. Triple Crown champion jockey Jean Cruguet was aboard Mac Diarmida when he won the 1978 running of the Lexington defeating the now legendary Hall of Fame gelding John Henry.

Jockey Ángel Cordero Jr. won this race in 1977, 1988, and 1991. In1994 the U. S. Racing Hall of Fame jockey was retired from riding and got his fourth win overall with his first as a trainer when Holy Mountain won the Lexington Stakes.

On July 8, 2007 future Hall of Fame jockey John Velazquez rode Distorted Reality to victory in the final edition of the Lexington.

== Records ==
Speed record:

- 1:48.45 @ 11/8 Distorted Reality (2007)
- 1:59.55 @ 11/4 Lech (1991)

Most wins by a jockey:

- 5 – Jerry Bailey (1984, 1985, 1995, 2000, 2002)

Most wins by a trainer:

- 4 – William I. Mott (1993, 1995, 2000, 2006)

Most wins by an owner:

- 2 – John M. Olin (1969, 1976)
- 2 – Tartan Farms (James & Virginia Binger) (1979, 1981)
- 2 – Sheikh Mohammed (1993, 2003)

== Winners ==
Year	Winner	Age	Jockey	Trainer	Owner	Dist. (Miles)	Time	Win$	Gr.
2007	Distorted Reality	3	John Velazquez	Todd Pletcher	Centaur Farms, Inc. (Vernon Heath)	11/8	1:48.45	$64,800	L
2006	After Market	3	Cornelio Velásquez	William I. Mott	Pam & Martin Wygod	11/8	1:48.80	$65,640	G3
2005	Woodlander	3	Edgar Prado	Thomas Albertrani	Darley Stable	11/4	2:01.92	$65,820	G3
2004	Mustanfar	3	Jose Santos	Kiaran P. McLaughlin	Shadwell Stable	11/4	2:01.15	$66,660	G3
2003	Sharp Impact	3	Richard Migliore	Kiaran P. McLaughlin	Sheikh Mohammed	11/4	2:02.62	$90,000	G3
2002	Chiselling	3	Jerry Bailey	Robert J. Frankel	Juddmonte Farms	11/4	2:00.42	$90,000	G3
2001	Sharp Performance	3	John Velazquez	David G. Donk	William Bloom, John T. Behrendt, Charles K. Marquis	11/4	1:58.93	$90,000	G3
2000	Rob's Spirit	3	Jerry Bailey	William I. Mott	Allen E. Paulson	11/4	2:02.87	$90,000	G3
1999	Mythical Gem	3	Jorge Chavez	H. Graham Motion	Dogwood Stable	11/4	2:01.21	$90,000	G3
1998	Parade Ground	3	Mike E. Smith	Neil J. Howard	William S. Farish III	11/4	2:00.55	$84,060	G3
1997	Private Buck Trout	3	Jorge Chavez	Robert D. DeBonis	A. Campagne, Robert Debonis, Joseph R. Sofia	11/4	2:01.29	$90,000	G3
1996	Ok by Me	3	Jorge Chavez	H. James Bond	Rudlein Stable (Donald & Anne Rudder) & William Clifton Jr.	11/4	2:03.58	$68,160	G3
1995	Green Means Go	3	Jerry Bailey	William I. Mott	Pin Oak Stable	11/4	2:01.69	$66,960	G3
1994	Holy Mountain	3	John Velazquez	Ángel Cordero Jr.	Lazer Two Stable	11/4	1:59.74	$50,850	G3
1993	Llandaff	3	Julie Krone	William I. Mott	Sheikh Mohammed	11/4	2:02.93	$52,380	G3
1992	Spectacular Tide	3	Julie Krone	Stanley M. Hough	Royal Lines Stable & David J. Whelan	11/4	2:02.20	$69,120	G3
1991	Lech	3	Ángel Cordero Jr.	David G. Donk	Henryk deKwiatkowski	11/4	1:59.55	$71,160	G3
1990	Solar Splendor	3	Eddie Maple	Patrick J. Kelly	Live Oak Plantation	11/4	2:01.80	$56,640	G3
1989	Coosaragga	3	Richard Migliore	Richard A. Violette Jr.	Morton & Rosalind Rosenthal	11/4	2:00.80	$69,720	G2
1988	Sunshine Forever	3	Ángel Cordero Jr.	John M. Veitch	Darby Dan Farm	11/4	2:03.00	$85,500	G2
1987	Milesius	3	Eddie Maple	Richard J. Lundy	Virginia Kraft Payson	11/4	2:03.20	$89,580	G2
1986	Manila	3	Jose Santos	LeRoy Jolley	Bradley M. Shannon	11/4	2:03.20	$88,980	G2
1985	Danger's Hour	3	Jerry Bailey	MacKenzie Miller	Rokeby Stable	11/4	2:00.40	$71,370	G2
1984	Onyxly	3	Jerry Bailey	John P. Campo	Luck Si Si Stable	11/4	2:01.20	$58,770	G2
1983	Kilauea	3	Jean Cruguet	William H. Turner Jr.	Welcome Farm (Anne & Richard Winn)	11/4	2:00.60	$34,800	G2
1982-1	Majesty's Prince	3	Eddie Maple	Joseph B. Cantey	John Dewitt Marsh	11/4	2:03.00	$50,310	G2
1982-2	Royal Roberto	3	Jeffrey Fell	James H. Iselin	Key West Stable (Mitchell Wolfson Sr.)	11/4	2:01.80	$50,310	G2
1981	Acaroid	3	Cash Asmussen	Jan H. Nerud	Tartan Farms (James & Virginia Binger)	11/4	2:00.20	$52,380	G2
1980	Good Bid	3	Jean-Luc Samyn	H. Allen Jerkens	Paul Tackett	11/4	2:01.00	$50,310	G2
1979	Virilify	3	Roger Velez	Jan H. Nerud	Tartan Farms (James & Virginia Binger)	11/4	2:02.40	$50,895	G2
1978	Mac Diarmida	3	Jean Cruguet	Flint S. Schulhofer	Jerome M. Torsney	11/16	1:41.00	$34,110	G2
1977-1	Swoon Swept	3	Larry Melancon	Michael D. Tinker	W. Cal Partee	11/16	1:41.20	$32,400	G2
1977-2	Johnny D.	3	Ángel Cordero Jr.	Michael Kay	Dana S. Bray Jr.	11/16	1:41.00	$32,100	G2
1976-1	Fabled Monarch	3	Jacinto Vásquez	Woody Stephens	John M. Olin	11/8	1:50.00	$27,450	G2
1976-2	Modred	3	Craig Perret	Willard C. Freeman	Helen E. Hertz Hexter	11/8	1:49.40	$27,300	G2
1975-1	Dr. Emil	3	Mike Venezia	William F. Schmitt	C. Herbert Kaufman	13/16	2:07.00	$27,270	G2
1975-2	Brian Boru	3	Braulio Baeza	Frank I. Wright	Barbara Guggenheim Obre	13/16	2:07.60	$27,270	G2
1974-1	Jack Spratt	3	Ron Turcotte	John M. Gaver Sr.	Greentree Stable	13/16	1:56.40	$28,020	G2
1974-2	Hasty Tudor	3	Vincent Bracciale Jr.	Howard M. Tesher	John D. King	13/16	1:56.80	$27,870	G2
1973	London Company	3	Laffit Pincay Jr.	LeRoy Jolley	Bertram Firestone	13/16	1:56.00	$35,760	G2
1972	Big Spruce	3	Raul Cespedes	Victor J. Nickerson	Elmendorf	13/16	1:56.80	$34,740	
1971	Bold Reason	3	John L. Rotz	Angel Penna Sr.	William A. Levin	13/16	1:54.80	$33,840	
1970-1	Roman Scout	3	Jacinto Vásquez	Clyde Troutt	Ada L. Rice	11/16	1:43.20	$14,771	
1970-2	Naskra	3	Jean Cruguet	Philip G. Johnson	Harry Gordon, Her-Jac Stable (Richard Hersch & Peter Jacobs)	11/16	1:43.40	$15,096	
1969	Eaglesham	3	Pete Anderson	Woody Stephens	John M. Olin	11/16	1:46.60	$18,720	
1965	– 1968	Race not held							
1964	Laugh Aloud	3	Ron Turcotte	Edward A. Christmas	Howell E. Jackson III	11/16	1:43.00	$19,142	
1963	Marlin Bay	3	Johnny Sellers	Arthur W. Beuzeville	Verna Lea Farm (Gene Goff)	11/16	1:41.20	$18,752	
1962	Mongo	3	Charlie Burr	Frank A. Bonsal	Montpelier Stable	1 m	1:34.20	$18,850	
1961	Wise Ship	3	Heliodoro Gustines	Jacob Byer	Milton J. Ritzenberg	15/8 m	2:41.80	$36,335	
