= Gerry Feilden Hurdle =

Hurdle horse race in Britain

Gerry Feilden Hurdle
2025
Tutti Quanti	Indeevar Bleu	Indemnity

Previous years
2024
Navajo Indy	Queens Gamble	Our Champ
2023
Hansard	Bad	Brentford Hope
2022
First Street	Grivetana	Teddy Blue
2021
Onemorefortheroad	Captain Morgs	Gowel Road

2020-2011
2020
Floressa	The Pink'n	Milkwood
2019
Epatante	French Crusader	Elusive Belle
2018
Global Citizen	Lisp	Mont Des Avaloirs
2017
High Bridge	Charli Parcs	Poppy Kay
2016
Who Dares Wins	Theligny	Makethedifference
2015
Sternrubin	John Constable	Ch'tibello
2014
L'ami Serge	Kilcooley	Violet Dancer
2013
Ifandbutwhynot	Chatterbox	Chris Pea Green
2012
Lyvius	Edgardo Sol	Peckhamecho
2011
Rock on Ruby	Empire Levant	Raya Star

2010-2001
2010
Tocca Ferro	Rebel Dancer	Olofi
2009
Fairyland	Frontier Dancer	Trafalgar Road
2008
Helens Vision	Khyber Kim	Prince Taime
2007
Mon Michel	French Saulaie	European Dream
2006
Afsoun	Craven	Iffy
2005
Manorson	Dom d'Orgeval	Only Vintage
2004
Distant Prospect	Albuhera	Howle Hill
2003
Tramantano	Sporazene	Saintsaire
2002
Never	Jaboune	Rainbows Aglitter
2001
Got One Too	Tikram	Fait Le Jojo

2000-1991
2000
Male-Ana-Mou	Mr Cool	Milligan
1999
Bacchanal	Hit And Run	Auetaler
1998
Wahiba Sands	Decoupage	Zafarabad
1997
Sanmartino	I'm Supposin	Finnegan's Hollow
1996
Zabadi	Urubande	Punting Pete
1995
Killone Abbot	Mouse Bird	Kissair
1994
Large Action	Jazilah	Glenstal Flagship
1993
Bold Boss	Winter Squall	Satin Lover
1992
Mighty Mogul	Staunch Friend	Lift And Load
1991
Gran Alba	Oh So Risky	Song of Sixpence

1990-1987
1990
Fidway	Atlaal	Black Humour
1989
Cruising Altitude	Morley Street	Nomadic Way
1988
Kribensis	Calapaez	Decided
1987
Celtic Chief	Osric	Ghofar

The Gerry Feilden Hurdle is a Premier Handicap National Hunt hurdle race in Great Britain which is open to horses aged four years or older. It is run at Newbury over a distance of about 2 miles and half a furlong (2 miles and 69 yards, or 3,282 metres), and it is scheduled to take place each year in late November or early December at the course's Ladbrokes Trophy meeting.

It is currently an Intermediate Hurdle (Limited Handicap) sponsored by Ladbrokes Coral, but in the 1980s and early 1990s it was a Grade 2 race, contested by many of the top hurdlers. It was given Grade 2 status when the National Hunt Pattern was revised in 1989 and was restricted to horses in their second winning season (intermediates) over hurdles – the 1992 running, for example, was restricted to horses which had not won prior to 2 August 1991. Similar conditions still apply – the 2019 running was restricted to horses which had not won before 29 April 2019. The race was subsequently reduced to Listed status and was re-classified as a Premier Handicap from the 2022 running when Listed status was removed from handicap races.

The race was first run in 1954, and is named in honour of General Sir Randle (Gerry) Feilden, one of the great post-war racing administrators.

== Winners ==
Year	Winner	Age	Weight	Jockey	Trainer
1954	Syrte	4	12-02	Fred Winter	Ryan Price
1955	Punjab	4	10-01	Harry Sprague	Tommy Farmer
1956	Hilarion	8	11-04	Michael Scudamore	Bill Wightman
1957	Fare Time	4	10–12	Johnnie Gilbert	Ryan Price
1958	Retour de Flamme	5	12-04	Dave Dick	Syd Warren
1959	Langton Heath	5	11-04	Raymond Martin	T Griffiths
1960	Rough Tweed	6	10-04	Johnny East	Neville Crump
1961	Anzio	4	11-01	Bobby Beasley	Fulke Walwyn
1962	White Park Bay	7	11-04	Josh Gifford	Peter Payne-Gallwey
1963	Salmon Spray	5	10-08	Johnny Haine	Bob Turnell
1964	Golden Sailor	5	10-04	David Nicholson	George Vergette
1965	Lanconello	6	10-05	Johnny Haine	Keith Piggott
1966	Hanassi	6	10-06	Andy Turnell	John Goldsmith
1967	Secret Agent II	5	10-02	Josh Gifford	John Benstead
1968	Bric-Brac	9	11-06	Joe Guest	Harry Hannon
1969	Viroy	5	11-06	Josh Gifford	Ryan Price
1970	Coral Diver	5	12-00	Ken White	Fred Rimell
1971	Eric	4	10-08	Jimmy Nolan	Vernon Cross
1972	Comedy of Errors	5	12-00	Bill Smith	Fred Rimell
1973	Lanzarote	5	11-10	Richard Pitman	Fred Winter
1974	Flash Imp	5	11-06	Jeff King	Ron Smyth
1975	Dramatist	4	11-01	Bill Smith	Fulke Walwyn
1976	Beacon Light	5	12-00	Andy Turnell	Bob Turnell
1977	Decent Fellow	4	11-09	Richard Linley	Toby Balding
1978	Connaught Ranger	4	11-09	John Burke	Fred Rimell
1979	Celtic Ryde	4	11-05	Martin O'Halloran	Peter Cundell
1980	Pollardstown	5	11-08	Philip Blacker	Stan Mellor
1981	Heighlin	5	11-08	Steve Jobar	David Elsworth
1982	Royal Vulcan	4	11-00	Jonjo O'Neill	Neville Callaghan
1983	Buck House	5	11-08	Tommy Carmody	Mouse Morris
1984	Ra Nova	5	11-03	Mark Perrett	Nan Kennedy
1985	Gala's Image	5	11-00	Richard Linley	Mercy Rimell
1986	Barnbrook Again	5	11-00	Ross Arnott	David Elsworth
1987	Celtic Chief	4	11-00	Peter Scudamore	Mercy Rimell
1988	Kribensis	4	11-06	Richard Dunwoody	Michael Stoute
1989	Cruising Altitude	6	11-03	Jamie Osborne	Oliver Sherwood
1990	Fidway	5	11-06	Steve Smith Eccles	Tim Thomson Jones
1991	Gran Alba	5	11-00	Graham McCourt	Richard Hannon, Sr.
1992	Mighty Mogul	5	11-03	Richard Dunwoody	David Nicholson
1993	Bold Boss	4	11-03	Richard Dunwoody	Martin Pipe
1994	Large Action	6	10-09	Jamie Osborne	Oliver Sherwood
1995	Killone Abbot	6	10-03	Jamie Osborne	Jim Old
1996	Zabadi	4	11-06	Norman Williamson	David Nicholson
1997	Sanmartino	5	11-06	Adrian Maguire	David Nicholson
1998	Wahiba Sands	5	11-00	Richard Dunwoody	Martin Pipe
1999	Bacchanal	5	11-09	Mick Fitzgerald	Nicky Henderson
2000	Male-Ana-Mou	7	10-07	Robert Thornton	Jamie Poulton
2001	Got One Too	4	11-00	Norman Williamson	Nicky Henderson
2002	Never	5	11-09	Thierry Doumen	François Doumen
2003	Tramantano	4	10–12	Carl Llewellyn	Nigel Twiston-Davies
2004	Distant Prospect	7	10-04	Timmy Murphy	Andrew Balding
2005	Manorson	6	10-09	Graham Lee	Oliver Sherwood
2006	Afsoun	4	11-10	Mick Fitzgerald	Nicky Henderson
2007	Mon Michel	4	10-04	Jamie Moore	Gary Moore
2008	Helens Vision	5	10-07	Seamus Durack	Tim Vaughan
2009	Fairyland	6	10-08	Barry Geraghty	Nicky Henderson
2010	Tocca Ferro	5	10–13	Sam Thomas	Emma Lavelle
2011	Rock On Ruby	6	11-10	Ruby Walsh	Paul Nicholls
2012	Lyvius	4	10-07	Barry Geraghty	Nicky Henderson
2013	Ifandbutwhynot	7	10–11	Timmy Murphy	David O'Meara
2014	L'Ami Serge	4	10-07	Barry Geraghty	Nicky Henderson
2015	Sternrubin	4	11-01	Richard Johnson	Philip Hobbs
2016	Who Dares Wins	4	11–10	Wayne Hutchinson	Alan King
2017	High Bridge	6	11–03	Alex Ferguson	Ben Pauling
2018	Global Citizen	6	11-10	David Bass	Ben Pauling
2019	Epatante	5	11-06	Aidan Coleman	Nicky Henderson
2020	Floressa	5	11-05	Jeremiah McGrath	Nicky Henderson
2021	Onemorefortheroad	6	10-08	Jack Quinlan	Neil King
2022	First Street	5	12-00	James Bowen	Nicky Henderson
2023	Hansard	5	11-11	Niall Houlihan	Gary Moore
2024	Navajo Indy	5	10-05	Gavin Sheehan	Tom Symonds
2025	Tutti Quanti	5	11-01	Harry Cobden	Paul Nicholls

== See also ==
- Horse racing in Great Britain
- List of British National Hunt races
