= Mongo (horse) =

American-bred Thoroughbred racehorse

- Sire: Royal Charger
- Grandsire: Nearco
- Dam: Accra
- Damsire: Annapolis
- Sex: Stallion
- Foaled: 1959
- Country: United States
- Colour: Chestnut
- Breeder: Marion duPont Scott
- Owner: Marion duPont Scott
- Trainer: Frank A. Bonsal
- Record: 46: 22-10-4
- Earnings: $820,766

Major wins
- Lexington Handicap (1962); Trenton Handicap (1962, 1964); United Nations Handicap (1962, 1963); Ventnor Turf Handicap (1962); Diamond State Handicap (1963, 1964); Washington, D.C. International Stakes (1963); John B. Campbell Handicap (1964); Monmouth Handicap (1964); Widener Handicap (1964)

Awards
- American Champion Male Turf Horse (1963)

Honours
- U.S. Racing Hall of Fame (2026)

Mongo (1959-March 21, 1983) was an American Champion Thoroughbred racehorse that was most notable for his performances in turf races.

== Background ==
He was bred and raced by Marion duPont Scott, a member of the prominent Du Pont family. His sire was imported British stallion Royal Charger, a son of Nearco, which Thoroughbred Heritage says was "one of the greatest racehorses of the Twentieth Century". Mongo's dam was Accra, Ms. Du Pont Scott's foundation mare, who produced at least seven other winners including the three-time American Champion Steeplechase Horse Neji.

== Racing career ==
Frank Bonsal, a former jockey in steeplechase racing, conditioned Mongo for racing. As a three-year-old in 1962, the colt won important races on turf under jockey Charlie Burr. He notably won the Lexington Handicap, the first of two consecutive runnings of both the United Nations Handicap and the Trenton Handicap. The following year was Mongo's most successful. On November 11, he met the reigning American Horse of the Year Kelso, as well as challengers from France, Ireland, Hungary, Venezuela, and Russia in the Washington, D.C. International Stakes. The race evolved into a match between Mongo and Kelso throughout the last half-mile. On the line, Mongo prevailed by half a length, but his win was only confirmed after the track stewards rejected a claim of interference brought by Ismael Valenzuela, the rider of the runner-up. As a result of his successes, Mongo was voted the 1963 American Champion Male Turf Horse.

Mongo also raced successfully at age five. He defeated Kelso again to win the 1964 Monmouth Handicap, defeated the outstanding runner Gun Bow in the John B. Campbell Handicap, and set a new Garden State track record in winning the Trenton Handicap for the second time.

== Stud career ==
Retired to stud at Blue Ridge Farm near Upperville, Virginia, Mongo met with modest success. While none of his progeny met with his level of racing success, Mongo sired some good runners, including:

- Mongongo (1969) - winner of multiple stakes races including the Salvator Mile Handicap
- Bushongo (1971) - won Flamingo Stakes
- Commadore C. (1976) - Long Branch Stakes winner
- Mongo Queen (b. 1976) - won Sorority Stakes

Mongo died at age 24 on March 21, 1983, at Blue Ridge Farm.

== Pedigree ==
Pedigree of Mongo (USA), chestnut stallion, 1959
Sire Royal Charger (GB) 1942	Nearco (ITY); 1935	Pharos	Phalaris
Sire Royal Charger (GB) 1942	Nearco (ITY); 1935	Pharos	Scapa Flow
Sire Royal Charger (GB) 1942	Nearco (ITY); 1935	Nogara	Havresac
Sire Royal Charger (GB) 1942	Nearco (ITY); 1935	Nogara	Catnip
Sire Royal Charger (GB) 1942	Sun Princess (GB); 1937	Solario	Gainsborough
Sire Royal Charger (GB) 1942	Sun Princess (GB); 1937	Solario	Sun Worship
Sire Royal Charger (GB) 1942	Sun Princess (GB); 1937	Mumtaz Begum	Blenheim
Sire Royal Charger (GB) 1942	Sun Princess (GB); 1937	Mumtaz Begum	Mumtaz Mahal
Dam Accra (USA) 1941	Annapolis (USA); 1926	Man o'War	Fair Play
Dam Accra (USA) 1941	Annapolis (USA); 1926	Man o'War	Mahubah
Dam Accra (USA) 1941	Annapolis (USA); 1926	Panoply	Peter Pan
Dam Accra (USA) 1941	Annapolis (USA); 1926	Panoply	Inaugural
Dam Accra (USA) 1941	Ladala (USA); 1927	Ladkin	Fair Play
Dam Accra (USA) 1941	Ladala (USA); 1927	Ladkin	Lading
Dam Accra (USA) 1941	Ladala (USA); 1927	Tonala	Broomstick
Dam Accra (USA) 1941	Ladala (USA); 1927	Tonala	Polly Flinders (Family:21-a)
