= Rickshaw Inn =

Hotel in New Jersey, United States

Coordinates: 39.9206°N 75.0391°W

The Rickshaw Inn was a 180-room hotel with a gold-plated roof, which was situated on Route 70 in Cherry Hill, New Jersey, opposite Garden State Park and adjacent to the Latin Casino, a popular nightclub which had relocated from Philadelphia to nearby Cherry Hill a few years earlier. Frank Sinatra and his Rat Pack entourage, Don Rickles, Steve and Eydie, Smokey Robinson, Diana Ross and other notable acts performed at The Latin, and stayed and drank at The Rickshaw. The hotel was built in 1964.

The celebrities, musicians and their hangers-on from "The Latin" often drank in the lobby bar. The luxury cars of politicians, celebrities and businessmen were parked up front under the Rickshaw's covered entryway. At the time, it was the most luxurious inn and restaurant in the local area.

The gold-roofed pagoda atop the Rickshaw Inn offered a spectacular view of Garden State Park's track and finish line, prompting Garden State owner Eugene Mori to plant a row of tall cypress trees to block the view from the Rickshaw.

In August 1965, Frank Adamucci, a co-owner of the Rickshaw with Dominick Vitese, was shot to death in the lobby of the hotel. Originally thought to be a mob hit due to the single shot and fast departure of a getaway car, investigators linked the killing to a botched robbery. Detectives arrested Bobby Lee Mayberry, William Kestner and John Miller, who had been casing the hotel for weeks and took note of Adamucci's propensity for greeting guests as they entered the hotel's opulent lobby. Mr. Miller was defended by court-appointed attorney Theodore Tarter. Witnesses stated that the fatal shot occurred when Adamucci, angered at Mayberry prodding him toward the office and safe, pushed at Mayberry's arm, causing the pistol to fire a single shot that pierced the businessman's chest.

Investigators later spoke to a bartender at a nearby lounge that remembered the trio, who as he recalled ordered unusual drinks, and alleged the men met frequently in the bar while planning the botched robbery. Camden County Prosecutor Norman Heine lead the state's case at the subsequent trial. Ruring Heine's questioning, Bobby Lee Mayberry abruptly confessed to the murder, shouting "I did it! I shot Adamucci!". The case is still studied in law schools as an example of the prosecution provoking a witness-stand confession.

The onset of casino gambling in Atlantic City brought an end to The Latin Casino; as a result, the hotel saw a steep decline in business.

The massive 1977 fire at Garden State Park's grandstand directly across from the Rickshaw caused extensive damage to the racetrack's gold roofed pagoda, but the Rickshaw was spared from damage.

In the 1980s the Rickshaw was stripped of its Asian-styled decor and golden roof, renovated to externally resemble the new Garden State Park grandstand and renamed the Garden Park Hotel. The re-branded hotel was not financially successful and was later closed due to code violations. A plan to convert it into a senior citizen's residence failed, and it was demolished in 2002. A Mercedes-Benz dealership moved to the site in 2006.

From their photo postcard (1975):

"Route 70 Across from Garden State Race Track The "Shangri-La" of superb hotel living. Maginificent Oriental decor in guest rooms, studios and suites that feature TV, room-controlled air-conditioning and heating, phones. Swimming Pool. Sauna Dry Steam Baths. Solarium. Cocktail Lounge. Gourmet Dining Room. A Temple of Elegance-For Lodgings-For Dining. Telephone Area Code (609) 665-6900"

This hotel was a central part of the history of Garden State Park, the Latin Casino, and Golden Triangle, New Jersey.
