= Premio Guido Berardelli =

- Class: Group 3
- Location: Capannelle Racecourse; Rome, Italy
- Race type: Flat / Thoroughbred
- Website: Capannelle

Race information
- Distance: 1,800 m (1.1 mi; 8.9 furlongs)
- Surface: Turf
- Track: Right-handed
- Qualification: Two-year-olds
- Weight: 56 kg Allowances; 1 1/2 kg for fillies Penalties; 3 1/2 kg for Group 1 winners 2 kg for Group 2 winners 1 kg for Group 3 winners
- Purse: €77,000 (2016); 1st: €23,800

The Premio Guido Berardelli is a Group 3 flat horse race in Italy open to two-year-old thoroughbreds. It is run at Capannelle over a distance of 1,800 metres (about 1 1/8 miles (1.8 km)), and it is scheduled to take place each year in late October or early November.

== History ==
The event was formerly known as the Premio Tevere. It was named after the Tevere, the Italian name of the Tiber river.

The race was given its present title following the death of Guido Berardelli in 1985. Berardelli served as president of UNIRE, a governing body of horse racing in Italy.

For a period the race was contested over 1,600 metres and classed at Group 2 level. It was extended to 2,000 metres in 1988, and shortened to 1,800 metres in 1995. It was relegated to Group 3 status in 2002.

== Records ==
Leading jockey since 1974 (5 wins):

- Gianfranco Dettori – Bolkonski (1974), Caro Bambino (1977), Panjandrum (1980), Miss Gris (1984), Yellow King (1988)

Leading trainer since 1982 (8 wins):

- Stefano Botti – Duck Feet (2011), Never Say Never (2012), Gentleman Only (2013), Misterious Boy (2014), Poeta Diletto (2015), Aethos (2016), Master (2023), Hanting (2024)

== Winners since 1987 ==
| Year | Winner | Jockey | Trainer | Time |
|---|---|---|---|---|
| 1987 | Noldinger | Vincenzo Mezzatesta | Mario Vincis | 1:43.30 |
| 1988 | Yellow King | Gianfranco Dettori | Alduino Botti | 2:10.10 |
| 1989 | Epicarmo | Marco Paganini | Lorenzo Brogi | 2:04.60 |
| 1990 | Fortune's Wheel | Éric Legrix | Robert Collet | 2:02.30 |
| 1991 | Jape | Alan Munro | Paul Cole | 2:10.90 |
| 1992 | Wootton Rivers | Darryll Holland | Peter Chapple-Hyam | 2:10.90 |
| 1993 | Cielo del Nord | Fernando Jovine | Lorenzo Brogi | 2:12.40 |
| 1994 | Court of Honour | John Reid | Peter Chapple-Hyam | 2:04.10 |
| 1995 | Brave Indigo | Fernando Jovine | Giuseppe Botti | 1:51.90 |
| 1996 | Golden Aventura | Frankie Dettori | Giuliano Fratini | 1:54.70 |
| 1997 | Special Nash | Maurizio Vargiu | Pierluigi Guarsegnati | 1:57.80 |
| 1998 | Strawberry Fields | Gabriele Bietolini | Antonio Peraino | 1:54.10 |
| 1999 | Shibuni's Falcon | Marco Monteriso | Maurizio Guarnieri | 1:59.80 |
| 2000 | Mistero | Giampiero Ligas | Gianluigi Crivelli | 1:56.70 |
| 2001 | Fisich | Dario Vargiu | Alduino Botti | 1:52.70 |
| 2002 | Borsieri | Maurizio Pasquale | Lorenzo Brogi | 1:53.30 |
| 2003 | Groom Tesse | Samuele Diana | Luigi Camici | 1:56.10 |
| 2004 | Le Giare ^{[a]} | Otello Fancera | Roberto Brogi | 1:53.70 |
| 2005 | Sunday's Brunch | Edmondo Botti | Alduino Botti | 1:55.70 |
| 2006 | Il Cadetto | Davy Bonilla | Luigi di Dio | 1:55.60 |
| 2007 | Fathayer | Giovanni Forte | Paolo Paciello | 1:52.80 |
| 2008 | no race ^{[b]} |
| 2009 | Tauman | Mirco Demuro | Vittorio Caruso | 1:52.70 |
| 2010 | Duel | Mirco Demuro | Vittorio Caruso | 1:54.10 |
| 2011 | Duck Feet | Claudio Colombi | Stefano Botti |
| 2012 | Never Say Never | Dario Vargiu | Stefano Botti | 1:56.57 |
| 2013 | Gentleman Only ^{[c]} | Fabio Branca | Stefano Botti | 1:48.86 |
| 2014 | Misterious Boy | Dario Vargiu | Stefano Botti | 1:50.10 |
| 2015 | Poeta Diletto | Carlo Fiocchi | Stefano Botti | 1:49.50 |
| 2016 | Aethos | Silvano Mulas | Stefano Botti | 1:53.00 |
| 2017 | Wiesenbach ^{[d]} | Fabio Branca | Il Cavallo In Testa | 1:55.80 |
| 2018 | Atom Hearth Mother | Gerald Mosse | Alessandro Botti | 2:02.37 |
| 2019 | Aurelius In Love | Claudio Colombi | Luciano Vitabile | 1:54.00 |
| 2020 | Isfahani ^{[e]} | Michael Cadeddu | Henk Grewe | 1:47.76 |
| 2021 | Ardakan | Clement Lecoeuvre | Markus Klug | 1:54.92 |
| 2022 | Sirjan | Eduardo Pedroza | Andreas Woehler | 1:48.67 |
| 2023 | Master | Dario Vargiu | Stefano Botti | 1:54.8 |
| 2024 | Hanting | Claudio Colombi | Stefano Botti | 1:50.2 |
| 2025 | Dr Omran | Jamie Spencer | Agostino Affe' | 1:49.10 |

^{a} Bernard finished first in 2004, but he was relegated to third place following a stewards' inquiry.
^{b} The 2008 running was cancelled because of a strike.
^{c} Gentleman Only was exported to Hong Kong and renamed Beauty Only.
^{d} Wiesenbach was exported to Hong Kong and renamed Arcatraz.
^{e} Bell'Imbusto finished first in 2020, but he was relegated to third place following a stewards' inquiry.
^{d} in 2024 the race was held in Milan

== Earlier winners ==
- 1972: Isidoro di Carace
- 1973: Little Boy Blue
- 1974: Bolkonski
- 1975: Bynoderm
- 1976: Baudelaire
- 1977: Caro Bambino
- 1978: Ice Cool
- 1979: Mister Ski
- 1980: Panjandrum
- 1981: Maria Stuarda
- 1982: Hasty Flirt
- 1983: Bob Back
- 1984: Miss Gris
- 1985: Bestebreuje
- 1986: Melbury Lad

== See also ==
- List of Italian flat horse races
