= Bob Back =

Thoroughbred racehorse trained in Britain

- Sire: Roberto
- Grandsire: Hail To Reason
- Dam: Toter Back
- Damsire: Carry Back
- Sex: Stallion
- Foaled: 26 May 1981
- Country: United States
- Colour: Brown
- Breeder: Joseph Allen
- Owner: Antonio Balzarini; Bruce McNall; Allen Paulson
- Trainer: Michael Jarvis; Angel Penna Sr. George W. Scott
- Record: 34: 6-4-6

Major wins
- Premio Tevere (1983); Valdoe Stakes (1984); Premio Presidente della Repubblica (1985); Prince of Wales's Stakes (1985)

Awards
- Timeform rating 110 (1983), 117 (1984), 124 (1985)

Bob Back (26 May 1981 – January 2011) was an American-bred, British-trained Thoroughbred racehorse and sire. He won the Premio Tevere as a two-year-old and the Valdoe Stakes as a three-year-old, but reached his peak in 1985 when he won the Premio Presidente della Repubblica before recording a 33/1 upset win over a very strong field in the Prince of Wales's Stakes. He was later exported to race in the United States but failed to reproduce his European form, winning one minor race from fourteen attempts. He later became a successful breeding stallion, making his biggest impact as a sire of chasers and hurdlers.

== Background ==
Bob Back was a big brown with a faint white star horse bred in Kentucky by Joseph Allen. He was sired by Roberto, an American-bred horse who won the Epsom Derby and the inaugural Benson and Hedges Gold Cup as a three-year-old in 1972. At stud, Roberto sired many important winners including Sunshine Forever, Touching Wood, Real Shadai, At Talaq, Lear Fan, Kris S. and Dynaformer. Bob Back's dam Toter Back was a daughter of the 1961 Kentucky Derby winner Carry Back and a granddaughter of the mare Roman Zephyr who also produced Roman Brother.

As a yearling, Bob Back was sold for $150,000 at the 1982 Fasig-Tipton sale and entered the ownership of Antonio Balzarini. He was sent to Europe and entered training with Michael Jarvis at his Pegasus House table in Newmarket, Suffolk.

== Racing career ==
=== 1983: two-year-old season ===
After finishing unplaced on his racecourse debut, Bob Back started third favourite for a twenty-eight-runner maiden race at Newmarket Racecourse in October and won by a length from Commanche Run. He was then sent to Italy and moved up in class for the Group Two Premio Tevere over 1600 metres and won by two and a half lengths from Life On Mars.

=== 1984: three-year-old season ===
As a three-year-old in 1984, Bob Back won once from ten races. On his seasonal debut he finished third to Trojan Fen in the Feilden Stakes at Newmarket in April and was then sent back to Italy to contest the Derby Italiano and was beaten a short-head into second place by Welnor with At Talaq in third. After being unplaced in his next three starts Bob Back started at odds of 8/1 for the Listed Valdoe Stakes over ten furlongs at Goodwood Racecourse in September. Ridden by Bruce Raymond he took the lead hal a mile from the finish and won by five lengths from Kalim. He went on to finish third to Estrapade in La Coupe de Maisons-Laffitte in September and third to Gay Lemur in the St Simon Stakes at Newbury Racecourse in October.

=== 1985: four-year-old season ===
On his first appearance as a four-year-old, Bob Back finished third behind Elegant Air and Parliament in the Group Three Westbury Stakes at Sandown Park Racecourse in April. After finishing unplaced in his next race he was sent to Italy for the Group One Premio Presidente della Repubblica over 2000 metres at Capannelle Racecourse in May and won by two and a half lengths from Reco. On his return to England Bob Back was one of four horses to contest the Prince of Wales's Stakes at Royal Ascot on 18 June. The race was widely regarded as a match between the classic winners Pebbles and Commanche Run with Bob Back starting a 33/1 outsider. The only other runner was Costly Lesson, who started at 66/1. Bruce Raymond restrained the colt at the back of the field as Commanche Run set the pace before moving up on the outside in the straight. He took the lead approaching the final furlong and recorded an upset victory, beating Pebbles and Commanche Run by one and a half lengths and a short head. Excuses were given for the beaten horses: Pebbles was reported to be in season whilst Commanche Run's connections claimed that he was unsuited by the muddling pace.

Bob Back went on to finish third behind Pebbles and Rainbow Quest in the Eclipse Stakes, but ran poorly when unplaced behind Commanche Run in the Benson and Hedges Gold Cup. On his final European start he finished second, three lengths behind Commanche Run in the Phoenix Champion Stakes. Bob Back was then sold to Bruce McNall and sent to the United States where he was trained by Angel Penna Sr. On his American debut he produced a good performance when finishing second by a neck to the gelding Win in the Man o' War Stakes at Belmont Park. In his two remaining races Bob Back finished unplaced in the Breeders' Cup Turf and the Bay Meadows Handicap.

=== Later career ===
Although it was reported that he would be retired to stud at the end of the 1985 season, Bob Back continued to race for two more years in North America in the ownership of Allen Paulson. He made no impact in 1986, finishing unplaced in all six of his races. He showed slightly better form as a six-year-old, winning an allowance race at Hollywood Park Racetrack in April on the fourth of his five appearances.

== Assessment ==
In the British Free Handicap for 1983, Bob Back was given a weight of 117 pounds, sixteen pounds behind the top-rated two-year-old El Gran Senor. The independent Timeform organisation gave him a rating of 110, twenty-one pounds behind El Gran Senor. In their annual Racehorses of 1983, Timeform described him as "likely to make [a] smart 3-y-o". In 1984 Timeform rated him on 117, nineteen pounds below their top-rated horse El Gran Senor, whilst the official British handicapper rated him twenty pounds inferior to the Irish colt. Bob Back achieved a peak Timeform rating of 124 in 1985, eleven pounds behind the Horse of the Year Pebbles. The official International Classification rated him on 83, making him the fourteenth-best older horse in Europe.

== Stud career ==
On his retirement from racing, Bob Back became a breeding stallion in Ireland, based at the Baroda Stud in County Kildare and the Ballylinch Stud in County Kilkenny before being moved to the Burgage Stud in County Carlow. The best of his flat runners was Bob's Return, who won the St Leger Stakes in 1993 although he also sired the Furstenberg-Rennen winner Big Bad Bob and the Premio Chiusura winner Inner City. He was more successful with his National Hunt runners siring major winner including Bobs Worth, Back In Front, Bacchanal, Burton Port (Mildmay Novices' Chase), Boston Bob (Melling Chase) and Thisthatandtother (Festival Trophy). He is also the damsire of the Grand National winners Synchronised and Many Clouds.

He was retired from stud duty in 2008 and died in January 2011 at the age of thirty.

== Pedigree ==
Pedigree of Bob Back (USA), brown horse, 1981
Sire Roberto (USA) 1969	Hail To Reason (USA); 1958	Turn-To	Royal Charger
Sire Roberto (USA) 1969	Hail To Reason (USA); 1958	Turn-To	Source Sucree
Sire Roberto (USA) 1969	Hail To Reason (USA); 1958	Nothirdchance	Blue Swords
Sire Roberto (USA) 1969	Hail To Reason (USA); 1958	Nothirdchance	Galla Colors
Sire Roberto (USA) 1969	Bramalea (USA); 1959	Nashua	Nasrullah
Sire Roberto (USA) 1969	Bramalea (USA); 1959	Nashua	Segula
Sire Roberto (USA) 1969	Bramalea (USA); 1959	Rarelea	Bull Lea
Sire Roberto (USA) 1969	Bramalea (USA); 1959	Rarelea	Bleebok
Dam Toter Back (USA) 1967	Carry Back (USA); 1958	Saggy	Swing and Sway
Dam Toter Back (USA) 1967	Carry Back (USA); 1958	Saggy	Chantress
Dam Toter Back (USA) 1967	Carry Back (USA); 1958	Joppy	Star Blen
Dam Toter Back (USA) 1967	Carry Back (USA); 1958	Joppy	Miss Fairfax
Dam Toter Back (USA) 1967	Romantic Miss (USA); 1953	Beauchef	Afghan
Dam Toter Back (USA) 1967	Romantic Miss (USA); 1953	Beauchef	Borrascosa
Dam Toter Back (USA) 1967	Romantic Miss (USA); 1953	Roman Zephyr	Roman
Dam Toter Back (USA) 1967	Romantic Miss (USA); 1953	Roman Zephyr	Blois (Family 16-a)
