= Latin Casino =

Nightclub

Coordinates: 39.922479°N 75.043976°W

- "Show Place of the Stars"
- Interactive map of Latin Casino
- Former names: "Carroll's" located at 1309 Walnut Street Philadelphia, Pennsylvania (1944)
- Location: Cherry Hill, New Jersey (1960)
- Owner: Stanley and Beatrice Carroll (1944–1968); Arthur Friedman and Jack Price (1943–1951); David Dushoff and Daniel "Dallas" Gerson (1951–1978)
- Seating type: Showroom tables, booth seating
- Capacity: 1,500
- Type: Dinner theater, nightclub, showroom
- Event: Entertainment

Construction
- Built: 1960
- Cost: $3 million (1960)

The Latin Casino was a Philadelphia-area nightclub that first opened in 1944 as the "Latin" located at 1309 Walnut Street in Philadelphia, Pennsylvania. Many top entertainers performed at the Latin, including Harry Belafonte, Jimmy Durante, Sammy Davis Jr., Dean Martin, Richard Pryor, Jerry Lewis, Milton Berle, Lena Horne, Pearl Bailey, Louis Armstrong, Lionel Hampton, Joey Bishop, and others.

The Latin was a popular Center City Philadelphia nightclub for a decade.

In 1960, owners Stanley and Bea Carroll, David Dushoff, and Daniel "Dallas" Gerson relocated the nightclub to 2235 Route 70 in nearby Cherry Hill, New Jersey, and built a plush 1,500-seat, Vegas-style dinner theater renamed from the "Latin" to the "Latin Casino", although casino gambling was not included. It was considered one of the fanciest, hippest dinner nightclub experiences of that time featuring dinner, drinks and a showcase of top entertainment, and was called "The Showplace of the Stars".

== History ==
In 1943 the first supper club including entertainment was opened by Jack Price and Arthur Friedman in Center City Philadelphia. Friedman was key to the night clubs' start-up because he was a US Army veteran. That status enabled him to obtain the liquor license needed to open and operate the night club. Arthur Friedman was Jack Price's nephew. He was the son of Frieda Friedman who was Jack Price's sister. The night club was then purchased by Stanley and Bea Carroll, David Dushoff and Dallas Gerson in 1951 and was originally located near Juniper and Walnut Streets in Center City, Philadelphia.

Frustrated by Pennsylvania's restrictive liquor laws, conflicts with city officials, the desire for more parking space, and outgrowing its small size, the two owners decided to move across the Delaware River five miles to Delaware Township, New Jersey (soon to be renamed Cherry Hill) in 1960. The new Latin was four times as large and located diagonally across the highway from the Seashore Line tracks and Garden State Park Race Track. Some of the first acts who played The Latin were Patti Page, comedian Sammy Shore, and Johnny Mathis.

== Theatre ==
"The Latin" theatre was a famous showroom for showcasing entertainers, like the area's neighbors of Cherry Hill Estates, the popular singer/performers Bobby Darin, Al Martino, and Frankie Avalon, whose family had ownership interests in a popular pizzeria "King of Pizza" diagonally across Route 70. Stars that appeared on stage and frequented the area were Frankie Valli and The Four Seasons, Richard Pryor, who recorded his 1975 album ...Is It Something I Said? there, Frank Sinatra, Tony Bennett, Pat Cooper, The Temptations, The Supremes, Liza Minnelli, Tom Jones, Donna Summer, B.B. King, Gladys Knight & the Pips, Connie Francis, Joan Rivers, Don Rickles, Gloria Gaynor, Della Reese, Eddie Fisher, Trini Lopez, Allan Sherman, Doris Ruby, Fran Warren, Danny Thomas, and Engelbert Humperdinck. The celebrities and orchestra players performing at the nightclub often drank at the neighboring Rickshaw Inn lobby bar.

There were several celebrity incidents that drew media attention. On September 29, 1975, Jackie Wilson suffered a massive heart attack while playing a Dick Clark show, falling head-first to the stage. He was singing his hit "Lonely Teardrops" and was stricken just after the line "My heart is crying, crying." Wilson became comatose and was taken to Cherry Hill Hospital; he lived in a nursing home until his death at age 49.

Brenda Lee broke her neck onstage during a June 12, 1962, performance, and eventually recovered in time to graduate from high school. Tom Jones was also once jumped outside the back door following one of his performances by two fanatical Italian women going by the name Canni. Mr. Jones was not hurt but the ladies were banned from 'The Latin' and from any Tom Jones performance. Philadelphia-native Bob Saget in 2017 talked about trying to sneak into the Latin Casino to see Don Rickles perform. He was arrested.

Also in 1978, with nightclubs in a general state of decline and competition from casinos in Atlantic City imminent, the Latin Casino was converted to a disco called Emerald City that boasted a neon light show over the dance floor that cost in excess of one million dollars. After a couple years Emerald City shifted from disco to rock club, hosting major and up-and-coming acts of the time such as The Rolling Stones, James Brown & The Famous Flames (who recorded their 1967 album, Live at The Garden, there), Aerosmith, The Ramones, Ultravox, Talking Heads, Elvis Costello, Alice Cooper, Madonna, The B-52's, The Go-Go's, Squeeze, Joan Jett, Dire Straits, The Romantics, UB40, Joe Jackson, Cyndi Lauper, The Psychedelic Furs, George Thorogood & the Destroyers, Blue Öyster Cult, and Prince on his debut tour. The Cure played their first ever U.S. show at this venue on April 10, 1980. It was torn down in the mid-1980s after a fire. The headquarters of Subaru of America was then built on the site, opening in 1986. Upon Subaru moving their headquarters to Camden in 2018, their former headquarters were demolished throughout May 2019.

In November 2019, the club was recreated for the setting of a scene in Martin Scorsese's film The Irishman.

== Restaurant ==
The menu reflected the Pop culture choices of the 1960s. The artwork for the menu cover was an ink drawing of the exterior façade on a background of drink glasses, music notes, and star-like asterisks. In the inside cover the management stated "The Latin Casino offers the ultimate in facilities for Banquets, Conventions, Trade Shows, Fund Raising Events of every type. Group size may be from 20 to 2000."

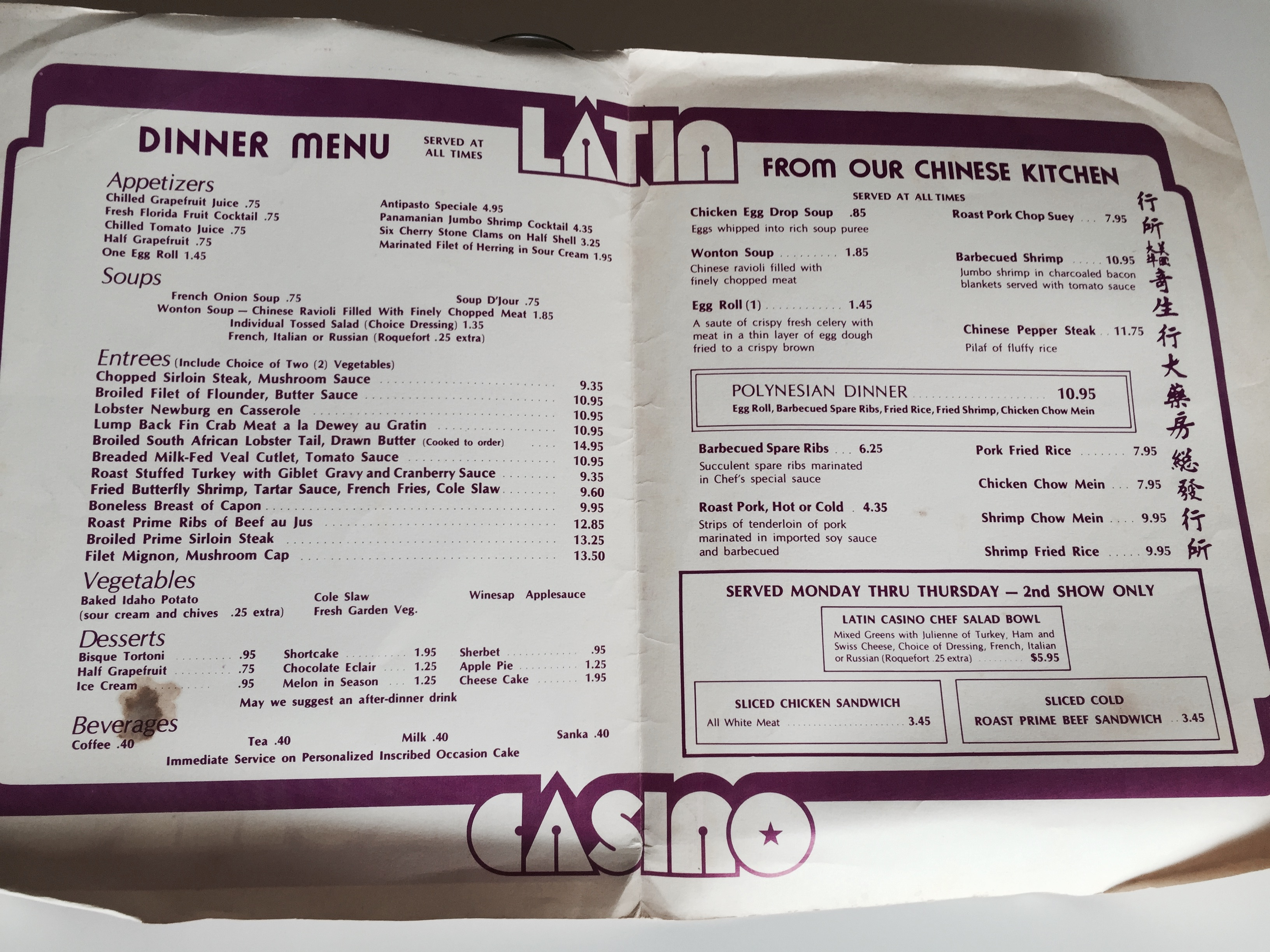
Menu of the Latin Casino, a Philadelphia, PA and Cherry Hill, NJ nightclub. Two shows nightly

The two-page menu had a variety of American-styled selections intended to attract the crowd seeking entertainment excitement, as well as the large groups for banquets or a grand place for various celebrations. On page one of food and listed on the left hand page were six headings that included nine appetizers, two soups/salad, 12 entrees (including lobster and steaks), vegetables, six desserts, and three beverages (no soda), with a final comment by the management: "May we suggest an after-dinner drink?" On the right-hand page of the menu was a section titled, "From Our Chinese Kitchen," which offered 13 Oriental entrees and several side dishes. A final item ending this page outlined in a long rectangle was a special menu selection of a “Complete Polynesian Dinner”.

== See also ==
- Spinners Live!, an album recorded here
