= Sherluck =

American-bred Thoroughbred racehorse

- Sire: Correspondent
- Grandsire: Khaled
- Dam: Samminiato
- Damsire: Dante
- Sex: Stallion
- Foaled: 1958
- Country: United States
- Colour: Dark Bay/Brown
- Breeder: Liz Whitney Lunn
- Owner: Jacob Sher
- Trainer: Harold Young
- Record: 26: 6-1-3
- Earnings: US$239,176

Major wins
- Blue Grass Stakes (1961); Lawrence Realization Stakes (1961); Roamer Handicap (1961); Triple Crown race wins: Belmont Stakes (1961)

Sherluck (foaled 1958 in Virginia) was an American Thoroughbred racehorse best known for winning the 1961 Belmont Stakes and ending Carry Back's chance to win the U.S. Triple Crown.

== Background ==
Bred by renowned horsewoman Liz Whitney Lunn, Sherluck was out of the British mare Samminiato, a daughter of the 1945 Epsom Derby winner, Dante, who in turn was a son of the great Nearco. His sire, Correspondent, was a winner of the 1953 Blue Grass Stakes and the 1954 Hollywood Gold Cup. Grandsire Khaled was also the sire of U.S. Racing Hall of Fame inductee Swaps. Sherluck was conditioned for racing by Harold Young.

== Racing career ==
At age two Sherluck's best result in a major race for his age group was a third-place finish in the Pimlico Futurity. At age three, Sherluck's win in the Blue Grass Stakes under future Hall of Fame jockey Braulio Baeza made him a legitimate contender for the 1961 Kentucky Derby. Under superstar jockey Eddie Arcaro, he finished fifth to Carry Back in the Derby and under Sam Boulmetis, he was fifth again to Carry Back in the Preakness Stakes. Going into the Belmont Stakes, Sherluck had won only once in his ten starts that year but, reunited with Braulio Baeza, the colt gave him the first of his three wins in the Belmont, with Carry Back finishing seventh in the nine-horse field.

With Braulio Baeza again on board, Sherluck won October's Lawrence Realization Stakes at Belmont Park, beating Carry Back again. The following month, jockey Bill Shoemaker rode him to victory in the Roamer Handicap at Aqueduct Racetrack

== Stud record ==
Retired to stud duty in the United States, Sherluck was not successful, and in 1970 was sent to breeders in France and then to Denmark in 1975.

== Sire line tree ==
- Sherluck
  - Dot Ed's Bluesky
    - Hello Hal

== Pedigree ==
Pedigree of Sherluck, Dark Bay/Brown colt, April 20, 1958
Sire Correspondent	Khaled	Hyperion	Gainsborough*
Sire Correspondent	Khaled	Hyperion	Selene
Sire Correspondent	Khaled	Eclair	Ethnarch
Sire Correspondent	Khaled	Eclair	Black Ray
Sire Correspondent	Heather Time	Time Maker	The Porter
Sire Correspondent	Heather Time	Time Maker	Dream of Allah
Sire Correspondent	Heather Time	Heatherland	Crusader
Sire Correspondent	Heather Time	Heatherland	Highland Mary
Dam Samminiato	Dante	Nearco	Pharos
Dam Samminiato	Dante	Nearco	Nogara
Dam Samminiato	Dante	Rosy Legend	Dark Legend
Dam Samminiato	Dante	Rosy Legend	Rosy Cheeks
Dam Samminiato	Life Hill	Solario	Gainsborough*
Dam Samminiato	Life Hill	Solario	Sun Worship
Dam Samminiato	Life Hill	Lady of the Snows	Manna
Dam Samminiato	Life Hill	Lady of the Snows	Arctic Night (family: 3-o)

* Sherluck is inbred 4S x 4D to the stallion Gainsborough, meaning that he appears fourth generation on the sire side of his pedigree, and fourth generation on the dam side of his pedigree.
