= Carry Back =

American-bred Thoroughbred racehorse

- Sire: Saggy
- Grandsire: Swing and Sway
- Dam: Joppy
- Damsire: Star Blen
- Sex: Stallion
- Foaled: April 16, 1958
- Country: United States
- Colour: Brown
- Breeder: Mrs. Katherine Price.
- Owner: Mrs. Katherine Price. Silks: Blue, Silver Hoops and Sleeves, Blue and Silver cap.
- Trainer: Jack A. Price
- Rider: Bill Hartack
- Record: 61: 21-11-11
- Earnings: $1,241,165

Major wins
- Remsen Stakes (1960); Cowdin Stakes (1960); Garden State Futurity (1960); Flamingo Stakes (1961); Florida Derby (1961); Everglades Stakes (1961); Jerome Handicap (1961); Trenton Handicap (1961, 1963); Metropolitan Handicap (1962); Monmouth Handicap (1962); Whitney Stakes (1962) Triple Crown wins: Kentucky Derby (1961); Preakness Stakes (1961)

Awards
- U.S. Champion 3-Yr-Old Colt (1961)

Honours
- United States Racing Hall of Fame (1975) #83 - Top 100 U.S. Racehorses of the 20th Century; Interred - Kentucky Derby Museum, Churchill Downs; Carry Back Stakes at Calder Race Course
- Last updated on October 5, 2006

Carry Back (April 16, 1958 – March 24, 1983) was a champion American Thoroughbred racehorse who won the 1961 Kentucky Derby and Preakness Stakes and was named the 1961 Champion Three-Year-Old. He won 21 of his 61 races, including the Metropolitan Handicap, Monmouth Handicap, Whitney Stakes, and Trenton Handicap. He became only the fourth horse after Citation, Nashua, and Round Table to earn $1 million in prize money. Trained by the outspoken and unconventional Jack Price, Carry Back's modest beginnings and come-from-behind racing style made him one of the most popular racehorses of his era.

== Background ==
Carry Back, a dark brown horse, raced in the blue and silver colors of retired manufacturer Jack Price, who bred the colt at the Ocala Stud in Marion County, Florida. Price trained the colt for his wife, Katherine. In early 1958, Price took over ownership of an obscure mare named Joppy for a fee of $150 plus a $150 overdue board bill at his Ohio farm. Joppy's racing record was poor. In seven starts, she finished second twice and earned only $325. Joppy was eventually banned from racing, a result of her frequent refusals to leave the starting gate. For a modest $400 stud fee, Price bred Joppy to a stallion named Saggy. Saggy's only real claim to fame was that in April 1948 he handed Citation the only loss of his Triple Crown winning season with a one length win in the Chesapeake Trial at Havre de Grace Racetrack.

As a three-year-old, Carry Back was described by an Associated Press reporter as a "little, scrawny" horse who weighed no more than 970 pounds. The horse was sometimes referred to by the nicknames "C. B." and "The People's Choice".

== Racing career ==
=== 1960: two-year-old season ===
Price ran Carry Back twenty-one times as a two-year-old juvenile, beginning in Florida in January, winning five times, with four seconds and four thirds. Even for the time, that was an exceptionally taxing campaign for an immature colt. In his first sixteen starts, Carry Back won two minor races, attracting some press attention when setting a track record for five furlongs at Gulfstream Park in April. He finished third to Hail to Reason in the Sapling Stakes at Oceanport in August and second by a nose to the same colt in the World's Playground Stakes at Atlantic City in September.

Carry Back's first important victory came on his seventeenth run of the season. In the Cowdin Stakes on October 3, ridden by Bill Hartack, he turned into the straight in third before producing a strong late run to win going away by one and a half lengths from Globemaster. He disappointed in the Champagne Stakes after being left at the gate, leading to concerns that he was developing the same problems which ended his mother's career. After being given extra schooling, he was sent to Garden State Park for the $287,000 Garden State Futurity, at that time the most valuable race in America. Price paid a supplementary entry fee of $10,000 to run Carry Back in the race, which he described as "a lot of dough to me." Ridden by Johnny Sellers, Carry Back was fourteenth of the fifteen runners in the early stages but moved into contention on the outside approaching the straight. He took the lead at the sixteenth pole and drew clear to win by three and a half lengths from Ambiopoise. On his final appearance of the season, Carry Back won the Remsen Stakes at Aqueduct Racetrack on November 8, coming from well back in the field to catch Vapor Whirl in the closing stages and win by half a length.

Carry Back's performances made him a championship contender, but Hail to Reason was preferred in the Daily Racing Form poll.

=== 1961: three-year-old season ===
==== Florida ====
Carry Back was sent to his home state of Florida in early 1961 and recorded his first important win of the year on his third start when he produced "one of his blazing finishes" to beat Sherluck in the Everglades Stakes at Hialeah Park Race Track on February 15. Ten days later, he added the Flamingo Stakes in which he got up in the last strides to beat Crozier by a head. On April 1, Carry Back ended his Florida campaign with a repeat win over Crozier in the Florida Derby. According to press reports, the victory established him as "the king of the Eastern three-year-olds" and a leading contender for the Kentucky Derby.

==== Triple Crown campaign ====
Universal Newsreel of the 1961 Belmont Stakes in which Carry Back finished seventh to the outsider Sherluck.

Carry Back then moved north for the Wood Memorial Stakes three weeks later. He started 19/20 favorite in front of a crowd of 57,109 at Aqueduct, but failed to catch the front-running Globemaster and finished second, beaten three and a quarter lengths. Despite his defeat and a poor outside draw, Carry Back was favored to win the Kentucky Derby two weeks later, with his main opposition expected to come from Crozier, Globemaster, and the Alberta Ranches entry of Four-and-Twenty and Flutterby. In the Derby, Carry Back started predictably slowly and was towards the rear, sixteen lengths behind the leaders in the early stages as Globemaster led from Four-and-Twenty and Crozier. Sellers began to move forward in the backstretch and brought the colt around the outside of the field before making his challenge in the stretch. Carry Back produced what reporters described as a "devastating stretch run" to catch Crozier in the closing stages and win by three quarters of a length. The slow winning time of 2:04.00 was accounted for by the "sticky" track conditions.

Two weeks after his Derby win, Carry Back, who was being described as "the most popular colt since Native Dancer" contested the Preakness Stakes at Pimlico Race Course. He produced his now familiar late run to catch Globemaster near the finish and win by three quarters of a length, with Crozier four lengths back in third.

Shortly after winning the Preakness, it was reported that Carry Back was injured while being transported from Pimlico Race Course to Garden State Park Racetrack. A veterinarian for the New York Racing Association gave Carry Back a clean bill of health and said the injury report had been "a cruel hoax".

With few new contenders emerging, Carry Back was an overwhelming favorite to complete the Triple Crown in the Belmont Stakes on June 3. He was sent off at odds of 2/5 in front of a crowd 51,586 which included former President Dwight D. Eisenhower. Globemaster went into the lead, but in contrast to the Derby and Preakness, the early pace was unusually slow. Carry Back was well back in the early stages, but on this occasion his late charge failed to materialize and he finished seventh, fifteen lengths behind the 65/1 outsider Sherluck. As he had done after the two previous legs of the Triple Crown, Price sent a case of champagne to the press box. The accompanying card read, "You hailed me in victory, now drink to me in defeat – Carry Back". It was subsequently revealed that the colt had been carrying an injury to his left front ankle.

==== Autumn ====
After a break of almost three months, Carry Back returned to win an allowance race at Atlantic City and then won the Jerome Handicap at Belmont on 2 September, producing his familiar stretch drive to win a "nerve-tingling battle" by a head from Garwol, with Sherluck unplaced. He was then beaten in the United Nations Handicap, the Woodward Stakes (third to Kelso) and the Lawrence Realization Stakes, leading to speculation that he had not fully recovered from his summer injury. One respected New York expert described Price as a "butcher" for persevering with the colt. On October 28, however, Carry Back returned to the winner's circle with a victory in the $75,000 Trenton Handicap at Garden State Park. Sellers brought the colt through from sixth place to defeat Intentionally and Ambiopoise, and then survived a protest from Ambiopoise's rider Bill Hartack before the result was confirmed. In November, Price announced that the colt would not run again in 1961 and that tax bills were forcing him to sell a 49% share in the horse to a syndicate.

Carry Back was unanimously voted 1961 U.S. Champion 3-Yr-Old Colt by the Thoroughbred Racing Association.

=== 1962: four-year-old season ===
==== Spring ====
Carry Back again began his season in Florida, finishing second to Intentionally in both the Palm Beach Handicap on January 31 and the Seminole Handicap eleven days later. After two further defeats, Price replaced Sellers with Manuel Ycaza but Carry Back was beaten again when third in the Gulfstream Park Handicap in March. After a short break, Carry Back moved north and recorded his first win of the year when taking the $10,000 Marriage Purse at Aqueduct by five lengths from Garwol. With that win, he overtook Stymie to become the fifth biggest money winner in American racing. A week later at the same course, he finished second to Ambiopoise when favorite for the Grey Lag Handicap.

==== Summer ====
On 28 May (Memorial Day), Carry Back contested the Metropolitan Mile for which the American Horse of the Year Kelso was made 3/5 favorite despite carrying 133 pounds. Ridden by Johnny Rotz (Ycaza had been suspended for his ride on Ridan in the Preakness), Carry Back took the lead well inside the final furlong and won by two and a half lengths from Merry Ruler with Kelso in sixth. The prize money of $72,735 enabled him to become the fourth millionaire thoroughbred in American racing history. Carry Back's winning time of 1:33.6 for the mile equaled the track record but Price admitted that Kelso, who was making his first appearance of the year, had not given his true running and was still the better horse. On July 4, Carry Back and Kelso met again in what was expected to be a virtual match race for the Suburban Handicap, but both were well beaten by the surprise winner Beau Purple. Ten days later, Carry Back, Kelso and Beau Purple all ran in the Monmouth Handicap. Carry Back showed his well-being as he "kicked and squirmed" in the paddock before the race and went on to produce his best performance of the year. Rotz produced Carry Back with a late challenge to take the lead halfway down the stretch and win by three lengths from Kelso in a track record time of 2:00.4 for the mile and a quarter. A week later, Carry Back started favorite for the Brooklyn Handicap but finished fourth to Beau Purple, to whom he was conceding ten pounds. With Rotz suspended, Carry Back was reunited with John Sellers in the Whitney Handicap at Saratoga in August. Carrying top weight of 130 pounds, Carry Back started odds-on favorite and won by two lengths from Crozier. By this time, Carry Back's winnings of $1,128,150 had taken him to third place in the all-time earners list, behind only Round Table and Nashua. On August 28 Carry Back easily defeated Beau Purple by eight lengths in the one mile Wilderness Handicap at Aqueduct, but ran a disappointing fourth to Crozier in the Aqueduct Stakes a week later.

==== Autumn ====
In autumn, Price sent Carry Back to France to prepare for a run in Europe's most famous all-aged race, the Prix de l'Arc de Triomphe at Longchamp Racecourse in Paris. This was a very unusual move in 1962, when trans-Atlantic travel for race horses was a difficult process. American horses such as Reigh Count and Omaha had been successful in Europe, but only after long periods of acclimatization. Arriving in France in mid-September, Price had only three weeks to prepare Carry Back for the unfamiliar conditions including the turf surface and clockwise track. Price booked the British-based Australian rider Scobie Breasley to ride the American challenger, a move that attracted the approval of experts including Eddie Arcaro who stated that an American jockey would be "buried riding low on that Longchamp track". Breasley placed Carry Back on the wide outside of the field, (following Price's orders to "stay out of trouble") and was never in contention. He finished tenth, beaten by five and a half lengths by the 40/1 long-shot Soltikoff. Price was unhappy at the result and issued a challenge to the owners of the first five horses for a winner-take-all rematch at $25,000 each. The connections of the filly Monade accepted, but the other owners declined.

Arriving back in America, Price decided not to subject his colt to a run in the two-mile Jockey Club Gold Cup and waited for the Man o' War Stakes on turf later that month. The field included Kelso, Beau Purple, Monade, Jaipur and T.V. Lark. Beau Purple won in record time from Kelso, with Carry Back in fifth. Carry Back was beaten a nose by Mongo, who carried eleven pounds less, in the Trenton Handicap and then raced over one and a half miles on turf again in the Washington, D.C. International. After disputing the lead until entering the straight, he finished third to Match II and Kelso in what reporters described as the "horse championship of the world".

Carry Back's retirement was announced and he returned to Florida for a farewell ceremony at Tropical Park Race Track on December 1 to mark the end of his racing career. In front of a 10,000 crowd, on what was reported to be his final public appearance, the colt galloped a mile around the track before being led into the winner's circle amid "thunderous applause".

=== 1963: five-year-old season ===
Carry Back spent the first part of the year as a breeding stallion at Ocala, standing at a fee of $6,500. In May, Jack Price announced his intention to take the colt back to the racetrack to "show him off to breeders," although he admitted that he was considering a return to competition In July, Carry Back left Ocala for Belmont to begin serious training for his comeback. Price later claimed that he only became intent on bringing his horse back from retirement after a rival breeder told him that it "couldn't be done."

On August 8 at Saratoga Race Course, Carry Back made his first appearance in a specially arranged training match against the 1963 Kentucky Derby winner Chateaugay. Although Carry Back was beaten five lengths, Price claimed that he was "not too disappointed" by the performance. In his first competitive race, he finished second to Gushing Wind in the Buckeye Handicap at Randall Park two weeks later. The comeback appeared to have ended shortly afterwards when Carry Back sustained an injury (described as "a chip in the sesamoid bone of his left ankle") when warming up for the Washington Handicap at Arlington Park. Price announced that the horse would be returned to stud but X-rays revealed that the injury was much less serious than first thought.

On September 6, two weeks after his supposedly career-ending injury, Carry Back, ridden by Howard Grant, recorded his first comeback win as he took a turf race at Atlantic City by six lengths. He then finished third behind Mongo in the United Nations Handicap on September 15. Carry Back finished unplaced behind Kelso in the Woodward Stakes after which Price intended to send the horse to France for a second attempt at the Prix de l'Arc de Triomphe. The second transatlantic trip did not materialize: Carry Back returned "sore" after the Woodward and then ran very poorly when tenth in the Manhattan Handicap. After the race, Price reportedly received 150 letters urging him to retire the horse.

Carry Back's final appearance came in the Trenton Handicap at Garden State Park on November 2. He recorded his most important comeback victory, winning by two lengths from a field which included Mongo and Crimson Satan. Price called the result "complete vindication." A week later, Carry Back had his second "farewell" ceremony as he paraded before the crowds at Garden State Park.

== Stud career ==
Carry Back returned to stud at the end of 1963. Although he was not a great success as a sire, he produced twelve stakes winners and the dams of thirty more. His progeny included Back in Paris (Gallorette Handicap), Sharp Gary (Illinois Derby, Display Handicap, Gallant Fox Handicap) and Toter Back (dam of the Group One winner and sire Bob Back).

Carry Back was voted into the American Hall of Fame in 1975.

After his breeding career ended, he was pensioned at the Ocala Jockey Club farm in Florida. In 1983, preparations were under way for a joint birthday celebration for Carry Back and his fellow Florida-bred Needles, who were then the two oldest surviving Kentucky Derby winners. A month before the "birthday party", however, Carry Back was diagnosed with cancer and euthanized on March 24 at the age of twenty-five. His ashes were originally interred at Ocala Racecourse but were later moved to the Kentucky Derby Museum at Churchill Downs in Louisville, home of his greatest victory. His grave marker carried the words "The People's Choice."

== Pedigree ==
Pedigree of Carry Back (USA), brown colt, 1958
| Sire Saggy (USA) 1945 | Swing and Sway; 1938 | Equipoise | Pennant |
| Sire Saggy (USA) 1945 | Swing and Sway; 1938 | Equipoise | Swinging |
| Sire Saggy (USA) 1945 | Swing and Sway; 1938 | Nedana | Negofol |
| Sire Saggy (USA) 1945 | Swing and Sway; 1938 | Nedana | Adana |
| Sire Saggy (USA) 1945 | Chantress; 1939 | Hyperion | Gainsborough |
| Sire Saggy (USA) 1945 | Chantress; 1939 | Hyperion | Selene |
| Sire Saggy (USA) 1945 | Chantress; 1939 | Surbine | Bachelor's Double |
| Sire Saggy (USA) 1945 | Chantress; 1939 | Surbine | Datine |
| Dam Joppy (USA) 1949 | Star Blen; 1940 | Blenheim | Blandford |
| Dam Joppy (USA) 1949 | Star Blen; 1940 | Blenheim | Malva |
| Dam Joppy (USA) 1949 | Star Blen; 1940 | Starweed | Phalaris |
| Dam Joppy (USA) 1949 | Star Blen; 1940 | Starweed | Versatile |
| Dam Joppy (USA) 1949 | Miss Fairfax; 1943 | Teddy Beau | Teddy* |
| Dam Joppy (USA) 1949 | Miss Fairfax; 1943 | Teddy Beau | Beautiful Lady |
| Dam Joppy (USA) 1949 | Miss Fairfax; 1943 | Bellicent | Sir Gallahad* |
| Dam Joppy (USA) 1949 | Miss Fairfax; 1943 | Bellicent | Whizz Bang (Family: 24) |

* Carry Back is inbred 4D x 5D to the stallion Teddy, meaning that he appears fourth generation and fifth generation (via Sir Gallahad) on the dam side of his pedigree.
