= Trenton Handicap =

- Class: Discontinued horse
- Location: Cherry Hill, New Jersey; United States
- Inaugurated: 1942
- Race type: Thoroughbred - Flat racing

Race information
- Distance: 1 1/8 miles (9 furlongs)
- Surface: Dirt
- Track: left-handed
- Qualification: Three-years-old & up
- Weight: Assigned

The Trenton Handicap was an American Thoroughbred horse race run annually at Garden State Park Racetrack in Cherry Hill, New Jersey. Open to horses age three and older, the race was contested on dirt at various distances during its tenure:

- 1 1/8 miles (9 furlongs) : 1942-1953, 1990–1996
- 1 1/4 miles (10 furlongs) : 1954-1971, 1974, 1989
- 1 1/16 miles (8.5 furlongs) : 1973

The race was part of the inaugural season at Garden State Park Racetrack which opened for business on July 18, 1942. That year's winner was Calumet Farm's 1941 U.S. Triple Crown winner, Whirlaway. In its heyday, Garden State Park Racetrack attracted racing's top stars and as many as 40,000 fans for big races such as the Trenton Handicap.

In 1957, the event was contested between just three horses. Bold Ruler, Gallant Man and Round Table were led to the post on 11/9/57. Bold Ruler went wire to wire on an "off' track and was named U.S. 3-Yr-Old Champion Male (1957) and DRF/TSD U.S. Horse of the Year (1957).

There was no Trenton Handicap from 1977 through 1984 after a fire destroyed the Garden State Park Racetrack grandstand. The business did not reopen until new owners rebuilt the facility in 1984.

There was another Trenton Handicap which was run at Havre de Grace Racetrack.

== Records ==
Speed record:

- 2:00.00 - Mongo (1962) (race and track record for 1 1/4 miles)

Most wins:

- 3 - Mr. Right (1967, 1968, 1969)

== Winners ==
- 1996 - Relentless Star
- 1995 - Poor But Honest
- 1994 - Double Calvados
- 1993 - Dr. Zoom
- 1992 - Fiftysevenvette
- 1991 - Killer Diller
- 1990 - Wind Splitter
- 1989 - Intensive Command
- 1988 - Manzotti
- 1987 - Broad Brush
- 1986 - Land Of Believe
- 1985 - Dr. Carter
- 1984-1977 - Race not Run
- 1976 - Royal Glint
- 1975 - Mongongo
- 1974 - True Knight
- 1973 - Mr. Correlation
- 1972 - Triangular
- 1971 - Tinajero
- 1970 - Ship Leave
- 1969 - Mr. Right
- 1968 - Mr. Right
- 1967 - Mr. Right
- 1966 - Handsome Boy
- 1965 - Slystitch
- 1964 - Mongo
- 1963 - Carry Back
- 1962 - Mongo
- 1961 - Carry Back
- 1960 - Manassa Mauler
- 1959 - Greek Star
- 1958 - Vertex
- 1957 - Bold Ruler
- 1956 - Bardstown
- 1955 - Social Outcast
- 1954 - Helioscope
- 1953 - Olympic
- 1952 - Ken
- 1951 - Call Over
- 1950 - Chicle
- 1949 - Sky Miracle
- 1948 - Double Jay
- 1947 - Cosmic Bomb
- 1946 - Turbine
- 1945 - First Fiddle
- 1944 - Bon Jour
- 1943 - Aonbarr
- 1942 - Whirlaway
