= Ridan =

French singer/songwriter

- Birth name: Nadir Kouidri
- Born: June 23, 1975 (age 49); Brou-sur-Chantereine, Seine-et-Marne, France
- Genres: French hip hop; dancehall; pop rap; reggae
- Occupations: Singer; songwriter; rapper
- Years active: 2004–present
- Labels: Sony BMG

Nadir Kouidri (born 1975 in France) better known by the stage name Ridan, is a French singer, songwriter and rapper of Algerian origin launched into the limelight in 2004. His stage name is the reversal of his real name Nadir.

He is known for his urban poetry in French banlieue (suburbs). A recurring theme in his songs is the difficult life of Arab immigrants in France. One of his most famous and popular songs is "Ulysse".

In 2005 he won "Victoires de la musique" award for "Album revelation of the year" for his album Le Rêve ou la vie. This prize was shared equally with Daniel Darc for the latter's album Crèvecœur.

In 2012, his single Ah les salauds! (Oh the bastards!) was the subject of controversy and was banned by several radio stations, because of the political message disseminated through the song.

== Albums ==
- 2004: Le rève ou la vie [Sony Music)
- 2007: L'ange de mon démon [Sony Music]
- 2009: L'un est l'autre [Sony Music]
- 2012: Madame la République [Les Fleurs, le Béton]
