= Garden State Park Racetrack =

Horse racing venue in Cherry Hill, New Jersey

- Interactive map of Garden State Park Racetrack
- Location: Cherry Hill, New Jersey, U.S.
- Coordinates: 39.926°N 75.036°W
- Date opened: July 18, 1942
- Date closed: May 3, 2001
- Race type: Harness and thoroughbred

Garden State Park was a harness and thoroughbred race track in Cherry Hill, Camden County, New Jersey. It is now the site of a high-end, mixed-use "town center" development of stores, restaurants, apartments, townhouses, and condominiums. Garden State Park's 600 acre (≈1 square mile) land area is roughly bounded by Route 70, Haddonfield Road, Chapel Avenue, and New Jersey Transit's Atlantic City Rail Line.

== History ==
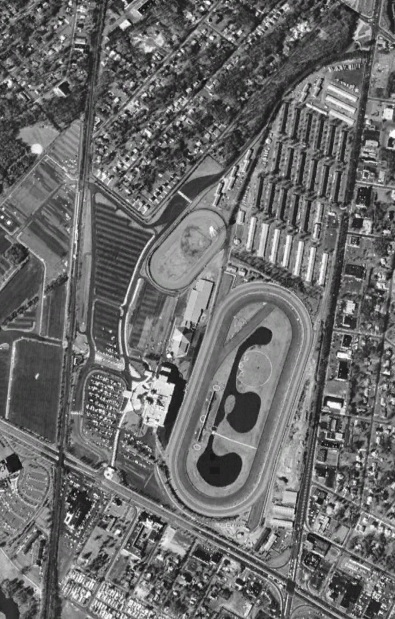
Aerial view of the facility in 1995

Garden State Park opened on July 18, 1942, after delays caused by raw material rationing at the United States' entry into World War II. Due to the seizure of 30,000 tons of structural steel by war authorities, developer Eugene Mori mostly constructed Garden State Park's ornate Georgian-style grandstand of wood. Limited amounts of steel came from the demolition of New York City's elevated railways. Despite this inauspicious start, 'the Garden,' as it was known, was officially 'out of the gate.'

In its heyday, it would host some of the finest thoroughbred racehorses in the nation at the signature Jersey Derby. Its Garden State Stakes and the Gardenia Stakes offered some of the largest purses available for two-year-olds. Horses raced at Garden State Park included Whirlaway, Citation, and Secretariat on a cold, rainy Saturday afternoon in early 1972 in the Garden State Futurity.

Garden State Park's success sparked a wave of entertainment-oriented growth and development in the formerly rural community of Delaware Township, New Jersey (now Cherry Hill Township). Mori followed his achievement at the racetrack with the construction of the Cherry Hill Inn on the site of Abraham Browning's Cherry Hill Farm (at Route 38 and Haddonfield Road); and in 1967 the Cherry Hill Lodge, also on Route 38 to the east of the Cherry Hill Mall. Soon to follow in 1961 was the Cherry Hill Shopping Center (today's Cherry Hill Mall, the first enclosed shopping mall on the East Coast) and the super-luxurious Rickshaw Inn with its gold-plated roof, which was situated on Route 70 opposite Garden State Park.

Diagonally across Route 70 on the map in then-Delaware Township was the Latin Casino, adjacent to the Rickshaw and the Garden. This dinner nightclub hosted acts like Frank Sinatra, Dean Martin, Liberace, Cherry Hill Estates neighbors Al Martino & Frankie Avalon and more; before closing due to competition from casinos in Atlantic City.

Followed later by Atlantic City Race Course and Monmouth Park Racetrack (1946), Garden State Park became a crucial part of what was called the "Golden Triangle" of New Jersey racing.

=== Fire ===
The "Golden Triangle" lost a leg on April 14, 1977, when a fire raged undetected at Garden State Park in the Colonial Room restaurant's kitchen during a racing program. Despite no functional firefighting system, the wooden grandstand lasted long enough to allow more than 11,000 patrons and employees to escape the inferno. At 4:45 p.m., the walls and massive roof overhang of the grandstand gave way to the flames and reduced the structure to a smoking ruin. Despite the flying embers nearly igniting The Rickshaw Inn across the street and the wooden barns and stables on the backstretch, the damage was contained to the massive grandstand complex. Three people died in the fire. One patron (Ed Bucholski) and one employee were later found in the rubble, and one fire officer (John McWilliams) died of a heart attack on-scene. But, the next day, the vault with the previous days' "take" was opened, with the money intact; while outside on the track, horses continued to train.

=== Rebuilding ===
Despite the stables on the east side of the track remaining open for training, Garden State Park no longer held races until securities trader Robert Brennan financed construction of a new $178 million steel and glass grandstand, which opened on April 1, 1985. The first race that day followed the schedule from the day the original track burned. The track, running night programs, provided racing for standardbred harness racing as well as thoroughbred racing. The grandstand also had on the Clubhouse level The Phoenix Room, which also served as a large banquet hall that hosted events year-round.

On May 27, 1985, Eclipse Award for Horse of the Year winner Spend A Buck won the first Jersey Derby at the new Garden State Park, having earlier the same year won the Cherry Hill Mile and the Garden State Stakes, both at Garden State Park, and also the Kentucky Derby. The $2.6 million purse, including a $2 million bonus put up by Brennan for winning the four races, was the largest single purse in American racing history up to that point.

One of the controversial tax breaks the facility enjoyed was a legislative loophole that allowed a near total exemption from what would have been high county property taxes because it was categorized as a "farm." It qualified for this special exemption because its operations generated horse manure that could be sold. The tax classification was allowed because the business "produced over $500 per year in agricultural products."

Some of the annual races at Garden State Park Racetrack included:

- Betsy Ross Handicap
- Camden Handicap
- Gardenia Stakes
- Garden State Stakes (Garden State Futurity)
- Jersey Derby
- Trenton Handicap
- Vineland Handicap
- William Penn Stakes

Garden State Park never re-acquired its glamorous past. Over sixteen years, the track suffered from the apathy of New Jersey horsemen and New Jersey state officials, and unrestrained competition from the Atlantic City casinos. The final straw came when Governor of New Jersey Christine Todd Whitman vetoed legislation that would have permitted slot machines at New Jersey racetracks, a measure that possibly could have saved the Cherry Hill landmark.

=== Demolition ===
On May 3, 2001, 2,000 fans came to see the last racing program at Garden State Park. After 58 years, the Garden ran its last race.

On October 30, 2003, with the property sold to Realen-Turnberry for a mixed-use 'town center' redevelopment, demolition started on the grandstand often referred to as a masterpiece. By late March 2004, all that remained of the racecourse was the original 1942 gatehouse on Route 70.

== Redevelopment ==
Garden State Park was redeveloped into separate retail and residential sections, owned by M & M Realty Partners. The retail section includes Costco, Wegmans, Home Depot, and Best Buy, and restaurants such as Five Guys Burgers & Fries, Panera Bread, Chick-fil-A, and Starbucks Coffee, The Cheesecake Factory, and Brio Tuscan Grille.

There have been plans by Parx Casino and Racing and Penn National Gaming, in a partnership, to build an Off Track Betting Parlor at the site of the former raceway near the lone standing entrance gate. On May 14, 2018, the United States Supreme Court struck down the Professional and Amateur Sports Protection Act of 1992, paving the way for states to legalize sports betting. New Jersey's enabling legislation that regulates and taxes sports betting at casinos and racetracks will include the former racetrack. The planned OTB plans to offer sports betting in Cherry Hill.
