= Carter Handicap =

Horse race in New York, US

- Class: Grade II
- Location: Aqueduct Racetrack; Queens, New York, United States
- Inaugurated: 1895
- Race type: Thoroughbred – Flat racing
- Website: www.nyra.com/aqueduct/racing/stakes-schedule/carter-handicap/

Race information
- Distance: 7 furlongs
- Surface: Dirt
- Track: left-handed
- Qualification: Three-year-olds and up
- Weight: Handicap
- Purse: $300,000 (2020)

The Carter Handicap is a Grade II American Thoroughbred horse race for three-years-old and older run over a distance of seven furlongs run annually in early April at Aqueduct Racetrack.

== Race history ==
First run in 1895, the race was named for Brooklyn contractor and tugboat captain, William Carter, who put up most of the purse money and provided the trophy. The race was hosted by the old Aqueduct race track from 1895 to 1955, except for 1946 when it was held at Belmont Park. It returned to Belmont Park from 1956 to 1959, 1968 to 1974, and again in 1994. In 2020 the event was moved to Belmont Park and held in early June.

There was no race held in 1909, 1911–1913, and 1933–1934. It was run in two divisions in 1977 and 1978.

=== Race distance ===
- 1895 – 1 1/4 miles
- 1896 – 1 1/8 miles
- 1897 – 1 1/16 miles
- 1898 – about 7 furlongs
- 1899–1902 6 1/2 furlongs
- 1903 onwards – 7 furlongs

== Historic notes ==
The Carter Handicap is the only American Thoroughbred stakes race in which a triple dead heat for a win occurred when Brownie, Bossuet and Wait A Bit crossed the finish line at the same time in 1944. There was another dead heat between two horses in 1977, a year when the number of entrants resulted in the race being split into two divisions.

On June 13, 1942, Lillian Christopher's trainee Doublrab defeated the 1941 U.S. Triple Crown winner Whirlaway while equaling the Aqueduct track record of 1:23 flat in winning the seven furlong Carter Handicap.

== Records ==
Time record: (at current 7 furlongs distance)

- 1:20.04 – Artax (1999) (new race and track record)

Most wins:

- 2 – Audacious (1920, 1921)
- 2 – Osmand (1928, 1929)
- 2 – Flying Heels (1930, 1931)
- 2 – Forego (1974, 1975)
- 2 – Lite the Fuse (1995, 1996)
- 2 – Dads Caps (2014, 2015)

Most wins by a trainer:

- 4 – John M. Gaver Sr. (1943, 1950, 1952, 1953)
- 4 – D. Wayne Lukas (1985, 1987, 1988, 1989)

Most wins by an owner:

- 4 – Greentree Stable (1943, 1950,1952, 1953)

Most wins by a jockey:

- 4 – James Stout (1939, 1944, 1945, 1954)
- 4 – Eddie Maple (1973, 1977, 1981, 1986)

== Winners ==
Year	Winner	Age	Jockey	Trainer	Owner	Time
Carter Stakes
2026	Point Dume	5	Edwin Gonzalez	Timothy C. Kreiser	Bush Racing Stable	1:22.53
2025	Crazy Mason	4	Manuel Franco	Gregory D. Sacco	Donna Wright, Reeves Thoroughbred Racing	1:21.95
2024	Post Time	4	Sheldon Russell	Brittany Russell	Hillwood Stable	1:24.00
2023	Doppelganger	4	Jevian Toledo	Brittany Russell	SF Racing, Starlight Racing, Madaket Stables, Robert E. Masterson, Jay A. Schoenfarber, Waves Edge Capital Catherine M. Donovan, Golconda Stable & Siena Farm LLC	1:23.25
Carter Handicap
2022	Speaker's Corner	4	Junior Alvarado	William I. Mott	Godolphin	1:21.34
2021	Mischievous Alex	4	Irad Ortiz Jr.	Saffie A. Joseph Jr.	Cash Is King LLC & LC Racing	1:23.97
2020	Vekoma	4	Javier Castellano	George Weaver	R. A. Hill Stable & Gatsas Stables	1:21.02
2019	World of Trouble	4	Manuel Franco	Jason Servis	Michael Dubb, Madaket Stables, Bethlehem Stables	1:23.28
2018	Army Mule	4	Joe Bravo	Todd A. Pletcher	St. Elias Stable	1:20.94
2017	Green Gratto	7	Christopher DeCarlo	Gaston Grant	Gaston Grant & Anthony Grant	1:23.25
2016	Salutos Amigos	6	Cornelio Velásquez	David Jacobson	David Jacobson & Southern Equine Stable	1:23.15
2015	Dads Caps	5	José Ortiz	Rudy R. Rodriguez	Vincent S. Scuderi	1:23.64
2014	Dads Caps	4	Luis Contreras	Rudy R. Rodriguez	Vincent S. Scuderi	1:22.02
2013	Swagger Jack	5	Irad Ortiz Jr	Martin Wolfson	Silverton Hill	1:21.44
2012	Jackson Bend	5	Corey Nakatani	Nick Zito	Robert V. LaPenta & Fred Brei	1:22.32
2011	Morning Line	4	John Velazquez	Nick Zito	Thoroughbred Legends Racing Stable	1:21.46
2010	Warrior's Reward	4	Julien Leparoux	Ian R. Wilkes	A. Stevens Miles Jr.	1:21.62
2009	Kodiak Kowboy	4	John Velazquez	J. Larry Jones	Vinery Stables / Fox Hill	1:22.47
2008	Bustin Stones	4	Edgar Prado	Bruce N. Levine	Roddy Valente	1:22.91
2007	Silver Wagon	6	Javier Castellano	Richard E. Dutrow Jr.	Four Roses	1:21.46
2006	Bishop Court Hill	6	José A. Santos	Todd A. Pletcher	Melnyk Racing Stables	1:23.27
2005	Forest Danger	4	Rafael Bejarano	Todd A. Pletcher	Aaron & Marie Jones	1:20.46
2004	Pico Central	5	Alex Solis	Paulo Lobo	Gary A. Tanaka	1:20.22
2003	Congaree	5	Gary Stevens	Bob Baffert	Stonerside Stable	1:21.48
2002	Affirmed Success	8	Richard Migliore	Richard Schosberg	Albert Fried Jr.	1:21.84
2001	Peeping Tom	4	Shaun Bridgmohan	Patrick L. Reynolds	Flatbird Stable	1:21.33
2000	Brutally Frank	6	Shaun Bridgmohan	Mitchell Friedman	Sunny Meadow Farm	1:21.66
1999	Artax	4	Jorge Chavez	Louis Albertrani	Paraneck Stable	1:20.04
1998	Wild Rush	4	Kent Desormeaux	Richard Mandella	Stronach Stables	1:21.16
1997	Langfuhr	5	Jorge Chavez	Mike Keogh	Gus Schickedanz	1:22.80
1996	Lite the Fuse	5	Julie Krone	Richard Dutrow Sr.	Richard Dutrow Sr.	1:20.80
1995	Lite the Fuse	4	Ramon Perez	Richard Dutrow Sr.	Richard Dutrow Sr.	1:21.40
1994	Virginia Rapids	4	Jean-Luc Samyn	H. Allen Jerkens	Middletown Stables	1:21.40
1993	Alydeed	4	Craig Perret	Roger Attfield	Kinghaven Farms	1:22.60
1992	Rubiano	5	José A. Santos	Flint S. Schulhofer	Centennial Farm	1:21.20
1991	Housebuster	4	Craig Perret	Warren A. Croll Jr.	Robert P. Levy	1:21.20
1990	Dancing Spree	5	Chris Antley	Shug McGaughey	Ogden Phipps	1:22.00
1989	On The Line	5	Gary Stevens	D. Wayne Lukas	Eugene V. Klein	1:21.40
1988	Gulch	4	José A. Santos	D. Wayne Lukas	Peter M. Brant	1:20.40
1987	Pine Tree Lane	5	Randy Romero	D. Wayne Lukas	Leonard Mathis	1:21.20
1986	Love That Mac	4	Eddie Maple	Wayne Widmer	Tatt Stables	1:21.60
1985	Mt. Livermore	4	Jerry Bailey	D. Wayne Lukas	Lloyd R. French Jr.	1:21.80
1984	Bet Big	4	Jean-Luc Samyn	Hubert Hine	Zelda Cohen	1:21.80
1983	Vittorioso	4	Alfredo Smith Jr.	Reynaldo Nobles	Robert E. Brennan	1:22.80
1982	Pass The Tab	4	Antonio Graell	Albert Barrera	Leopoldo Villareal	1:22.40
1981	Amber Pass	4	Eddie Maple	Hubert Hine	Entremont	1:23.00
1980	Czaravich	4	Larry Adams	William H. Turner Jr.	William L. Reynolds	1:21.00
1979	Star de Naskra	4	Jeffrey Fell	Richard D. Ferris	Carlyle J. Lancaster	1:21.80
1978	Pumpkin Moonshine	4	Dave Borden	Howard M. Tesher	H. Joseph Allen	1:22.20
1978	Jaipur's Gem	5	Jean-Luc Samyn	Philip G. Johnson	Jacqueline Crotty	1:21.60
1977	Quiet Little Table (DH)	4	Eddie Maple	Philip G. Johnson	Meadowhill	1:22.00
1977	Gentle King (DH)	4	Daryl Montoya	W. Preston King	Canam East Stable	1:22.00
1977	Soy Numero Uno	4	Ray Broussard	Homer C. Pardue	Strapro Stable (Joseph R. Straus Sr. & Isadore Proler)	1:22.20
1976	Due Diligence	4	Jose Amy	Lazaro S. Barrera	Harbor View Farm	1:22.40
1975	Forego	5	Heliodoro Gustines	Sherrill W. Ward	Lazy F Ranch	1:21.60
1974	Forego	4	Heliodoro Gustines	Sherrill W. Ward	Lazy F Ranch	1:22.20
1973	King's Bishop	4	Eddie Maple	H. Allen Jerkens	Bohemia Stable	1:20.40
1972	Leematt	4	Michael Venezia	Joseph P. Considine	C. Oliver Goldsmith	1:22.40
1971	Native Royalty	4	John L. Rotz	John T. Davis	Harbor View Farm	1:22.80
1970	Tyrant	4	Bobby Ussery	Frank Y. Whiteley Jr.	Locust Hill Farm	1:21.40
1969	Promise	4	Bobby Ussery	Frank Y. Whiteley Jr.	Locust Hill Farm	1:22.60
1968	In Reality	4	Jorge Velásquez	Melvin Calvert	Frances A. Genter	1:21.80
1967	Tumiga	3	Ben Feliciano	Lucien Laurin	George E. Robb	1:23.80
1966	Davis 2nd	6	Calvin Stone	Arnold N. Winick	Herman Harris	1:22.80
1965	Viking Spirit	5	Kenneth Church	James I. Nazworthy	Dorothy Ann Currie Brittingham	1:21.40
1964	Ahoy	4	Howard Grant	J. Bowes Bond	Jaclyn Stable	1:21.60
1963	Admiral's Voyage	4	Ray Broussard	Charles R. Parke	Fred W. Hooper	1:22.40
1962	Merry Ruler	4	Johnny Sellers	Edward J. Yowell	Harry Freylinghuysen	1:22.00
1961	Chief of Chiefs	4	Jack Leonard	Clyde Troutt	Ada L. Rice	1:22.80
1960	Yes You Will	4	Larry Adams	Jack A. Price	Edith L. Price	1:22.40
1959	Jimmer	4	John Ruane	Harold Goodwin	Myron N. Goodwin	1:22.60
1958	Bold Ruler	4	Eddie Arcaro	James Fitzsimmons	Wheatley Stable	1:22.60
1957	Portersville	5	Ted Atkinson	Alphonse J. Pupino	Clearwater Stable F.L. Leatherbury E.A. Roberts	1:23.00
1956	Red Hannigan	5	Paul J. Bailey	Homer C. Pardue	Woodley Lane Farm	1:23.20
1955	Bobby Brocato	4	Ray Broussard	William Molter	Joe W. Brown	1:23.40
1954	White Skies	5	James Stout	Tommy Root	William. M. Wickham	1:23.60
1953	Tom Fool	4	Ted Atkinson	John M. Gaver Sr.	Greentree Stable	1:22.00
1952	Northern Star	4	Ted Atkinson	John M. Gaver Sr.	Greentree Stable	1:22.00
1951	Arise	5	Eric Guerin	James C. Bentley	Addison Stable (Harry & W. Jack Addison)	1:23.40
1950	Guillotine	3	Ted Atkinson	John M. Gaver Sr.	Greentree Stable	1:23.20
1949	Better Self	4	Dave Gorman	Max Hirsch	King Ranch	1:25.20
1948	Gallorette	6	Job Dean Jessop	Edward A. Christmas	William L. Brann	1:23.40
1947	Rippey	4	Ovie Scurlock	Willie Booth	William G. Helis	1:23.00
1946	Flood Town	4	Warren Mehrtens	Max Hirsch	Edward J. Lasker	1:23.60
1945	Apache	6	James Stout	James Fitzsimmons	Belair Stud	1:24.60
1944	Bossuet	4	James Stout	James Fitzsimmons	Belair Stud	1:23.40
1944	Wait A Bit	5	Gayle Smith	Matthew P. Brady	William Ziegler Jr.	1:23.40
1944	Brownie	5	Eric Guerin	John B. Theall	Joe W. Brown	1:23.40
1943	Devil Diver	4	George Woolf	John M. Gaver Sr.	Greentree Stable	1:24.00
1942	Doublrab	4	Billie Thompson	Harris B. Brown	Lillian Christopher	1:23.00
1941	Parasang	4	Basil James	Edward L. Snyder	Cornelius V. Whitney	1:23.00
1940	He Did	7	George Woolf	J. Thomas Taylor	W. Arnold Hanger	1:23.80
1939	Fighting Fox	4	James Stout	James Fitzsimmons	Belair Stud	1:22.80
1938	Airflame	4	Raymond Workman	Bud Stotler	Alfred G. Vanderbilt II	1:23.60
1937	Aneroid	4	Charley Rosengarten	Dion Kerr	John A. Manfuso	1:23.60
1936	Clang	4	Eddie Litzenberger	William R. Sallee	John F. Clark Jr.	1:24.00
1935	King Saxon	4	Calvin Rainey	Charles H. Knebelkamp	Charles H. Knebelkamp	1:23.80
1934	Open Range	3	Eddie Litzenberger	George E. Phillips	William Graham	1:18.00
1933	Caterwaul	3	Raymond Workman	Thomas J. Healey	Cornelius V. Whitney	1:20.20
1932	Happy Scot	4	Alfred Robertson	Preston M. Burch	Cary T. Grayson	1:24.80
1931	Flying Heels	4	Charley Kurtsinger	J. Simon Healy	John J. Curtis	1:24.20
1930	Flying Heels	3	Willie Kelsay	Henry McDaniel	Gifford A. Cochran	1:24.40
1929	Osmand	5	Willie Garner	Pete Coyne	Joseph E. Widener	1:26.60
1928	Osmand	4	Earl Sande	Pete Coyne	Joseph E. Widener	1:25.00
1927	Happy Argo	4	Fritz Weiner	Max Hirsch	Kershaw Stable	1:24.20
1926	Macaw	3	Linus McAtee	James G. Rowe Sr.	Harry Payne Whitney	1:24.60
1926	Nedana	4	Laverne Fator	Sam Hildreth	Rancocas Stable	1:24.60
1925	Silver Fox	3	Laverne Fator	Sam Hildreth	Rancocas Stable	1:24.40
1924	Sarazen	3	Earl Sande	Max Hirsch	Fair Stable	1:25.60
1923	Little Colt	3	Clarence Turner	Sandy McNaughton	Sandy McNaughton	1:25.40
1922	Knobbie	4	Laverne Fator	Sam Hildreth	Rancocas Stable	1:24.40
1921	Audacious	5	Clarence Kummer	Sandy McNaughton	Foreign Stable	1:23.00
1920	Audacious	4	Frank Keogh	John J. Hastings	Morton L. Schwartz	1:25.00
1919	Naturalist	5	Charles Fairbrother	Thomas Welsh	Joseph E. Widener	1:23.00
1918	Old Koenig	5	George Byrne	George Ziegler	Beverwyck Stable	1:23.80
1917	Old Rosebud	6	Andy Schuttinger	Frank D. Weir	Hamilton C. Applegate	1:25.40
1916	Trial by Jury	4	E. Campbell	J. Simon Healy	Edward B. Cassatt	1:25.40
1915	Phosphor	3	Johnny Loftus	William H. Karrick	Schuyler L. Parsons	1:30.00
1914	Roamer	3	Merritt C. Buxton	A. J. Goldsborough	Andrew Miller	1:24.80
1911	-1913 no race					
1910	Gretna Green	6	Guy Burns	Albert Simons	John W. Schorr	1:27.00
1909	no race					
1908	Jack Atkin	4	Phil Musgrave	Herman R. Brandt	Barney Schreiber	1:27.80
1907	Glorifier	5	George Mountain	James H. McCormick	James H. McCormick	1:28.20
1906	Roseben	5	Lucien Lyne	Frank D. Weir	Davy C. Johnson	1:26.40
1905	Ormonde's Right	4	Willie Davis	A. Jack Joyner	Sydney Paget	1:26.80
1904	Beldame	3	Frank O'Neill	Fred Burlew	Newton Bennington	1:27.00
1903	Ahumada	3	Jack Martin	John A. Kyle	John A. Kyle	1:33.00
1902	Ethics	4	Harry Cochran	Richard O. Miller	Charles F. Dwyer	1:28.20
1901	Motley	4	Willie Shaw	William Lakeland	William Lakeland	1:28.00
1900	Box	6	Danny Maher	E. L. Graves	W. Showalter	1:26.00
1899	Duke of Middleburg	3	John Sullivan	R. Wyndham Walden	G. W. Graydon	1:26.60
1898	The Manxman	4	Harry Lewis	William Oliver	J. J. Harrison	1:29.60
1897	Premier	4	W. Coylie	Jim McLaughlin	Jim McLaughlin	1:49.00
1896	Deerslayer	4	Samuel Doggett	Walter C. Rollins	Walter C. Rollins	1:55.00
1895	Charade	6	Samuel Doggett	William R. Jones	William R. Jones	2:11.60
