= 1972 Preakness Stakes =

97th running of the Preakness Stakes

97th Preakness Stakes
- The Preakness Stakes
- Location: Pimlico Race Course, Baltimore, Maryland, United States
- Date: May 20, 1972
- Winning horse: Bee Bee Bee
- Jockey: Eldon Nelson
- Conditions: Sloppy
- Surface: Dirt

The 1972 Preakness Stakes was the 97th running of the $200,000 Preakness Stakes thoroughbred horse race. The race took place on May 20, 1972, and was televised in the United States on the CBS television network. Bee Bee Bee, who was jockeyed by Eldon Nelson, won the race by one and one half lengths over runner-up No Le Hace. Approximate post time was 5:40 p.m. Eastern Time. The race was run on a sloppy track in a final time of 1:55-3/5. The Maryland Jockey Club reported total attendance of 48,721, this is recorded as third highest on the list of American thoroughbred racing top attended events for North America in 1972.

== Payout ==
The 97th Preakness Stakes Payout Schedule

Program Number	Horse Name	Win	Place	Show
8	Bee Bee Bee	$39.40	$13.80	$4.60
2	No Le Hace	-	$5.40	$3.40
4	Key To The Mint	-	-	$3.60

== The full chart ==
Finish Position	Margin (lengths)	Post Position	Horse name	Jockey	Trainer	Owner	Post Time Odds	Purse Earnings
1st	0	8	Bee Bee Bee	Eldon Nelson	Del W. Carroll	William S Farrish, III	18.70-1	$135,300
2nd	11/2	2	No Le Hace	Phil Rubbicco	Homer C. Pardue	Joseph R. Straus	5.70-1	$30,000
3rd	5	4	Key To The Mint	Braulio Baeza	J. Elliott Burch	Rokeby Stable	4.20-1	$15,000
4th	51/4	1A	Riva Ridge	Ron Turcotte	Lucien Laurin	Meadow Stable	0.30-1 favorite	$7,500
5th	93/4	7	Festive Mood	Sally M. Gibson	William H. Dixon	William A. Levin	65.60-1	
6th	163/4	5	Eager Exchange	Eddie Maple	John P. Campo	John DeWitt Marsh	47.50-1	
7th	201/4	6	Hassi's Image	James Moseley	Juan Arias	Hassi Shina	59.10-1	

- Winning Breeder: William S. Miller; (MD)
- Winning Time: 1:55 3/5
- Track Condition: Sloppy
- Total Attendance: 48,721
