= Questionnaire Handicap =

20th-century American horse race

- Class: Stakes
- Location: Jamaica Race Course; Jamaica, Queens, New York, USA
- Inaugurated: 1938-1953
- Race type: Thoroughbred - Flat racing
- Website: www.empirecitycasino.com/racing/

Race information
- Distance: 1 5/8 miles (13 furlongs)
- Surface: Dirt
- Track: left-handed
- Qualification: Three-year-olds and up

The Questionnaire Handicap was an American Thoroughbred horse race named in honor of the horse Questionnaire who was bred and raced by James Butler, the late president and owner of Empire City Race Track. The race was held from its inception in 1938 through 1942 at the Empire City RaceTrack in Yonkers, New York but with the United States becoming involved in World War II, in 1943 rationing and other wartime limitations resulted in the Empire City Association's decision to go back to hosting only harness racing. The Questionnaire Handicap was then moved to the Jamaica Race Course where it would run under the sponsorship of the Empire City Association through 1953 when it had its final running.

While never a major race, the Questionnaire Handicap drew some of the best horses of the day and from the top racing stables.

Race distances:

- 1938-1943, 1947-1952 : 1 1/16 miles on dirt
- 1944-1946, 1953 : 1 5/8 miles on dirt

== Notable events ==
In 1950, One Hitter set a new Jamaica track record of 1:42 2/5 for a mile and a sixteenth on dirt.

In 1951 there was a dead heat for first between Arise and Bryan G.

The 1953 race was won by 1951 Kentucky Derby winner Count Turf owned by New York City restaurateur Jack Amiel.

== Records ==
Speed record:

- At 1 1/16 miles : One Hitter (1950), 1:42 2/5
- At 1 5/8 miles : Princequillo (1944), 2:43 flat

Most wins by a jockey:

- 2 - Sam Renick (1938, 1939)
- 2 - Don Meade (1940, 1942)
- 2 - Eric Guerin (1949, 1951)
- 2 - Conn McCreary (1952, 1953)

Most wins by a trainer:

- 2 - Max Hirsch (1938, 1940)

== Winners ==
Year	Winner	Age	Jockey	Trainer	Owner	Dist. (Miles)	Time
1953	Count Turf	5	Conn McCreary	William B. Finnegan	Jack J. Amiel	15/8 M	1:43.40
1952	Alerted	4	Conn McCreary	James Penrod	Hampton Stable	11/16 M	1:44.00
1951	Arise †	5	Eric Guerin	James C. Bentley	Addison Stable	11/16 M	1:43.40
1951	Bryan G. †	4	Ovie Scurlock	Casey Hayes	Christopher Chenery	11/16 M	1:43.40
1950	One Hitter	4	Ted Atkinson	John M. Gaver Sr.	Greentree Stable	11/16 M	1:42.40
1949	Royal Governor	5	Eric Guerin	James E. Ryan	Esther D. du Pont	11/16 M	1:45.40
1948	Donor	4	Dick Rozelle	George P. "Maje" Odom	W. Deering Howe	11/16 M	1:44.80
1947	Stymie	6	Robert Permane	Hirsch Jacobs	Ethel D. Jacobs	11/16 M	1:44.00
1946	Trymenow	4	Arnold Kirkland	Oscar White	Walter M. Jeffords	15/8 M	2:44.60
1945	Eurasian	5	Herb Lindberg	Sol Rutchick	Havahome Stable	15/8 M	2:44.40
1944	Princequillo	4	Eddie Arcaro	Horatio Luro	Boone Hall Stable	15/8 M	2:43.00
1943	First Fiddle	4	Warren Mehrtens	Edward L. Mulrenan	Mrs. Edward L. Mulrenan	11/16 M	1:45.00
1942	Argonne Woods	5	Don Meade	Julius J. Bauer	J. H. Miles	11/16 M	1:43.60
1941	Parasang	4	Alfred Robertson	Sylvester E. Veitch	Cornelius Vanderbilt Whitney	11/16 M	1:45.60
1940	Tola Rose	3	Don Meade	Max Hirsch	Arthur J. Sackett	11/16 M	1:46.20
1939	The Chief	4	Sam Renick	Earl Sande	Maxwell Howard	11/16 M	1:45.40
1938	Unfailing	4	Sam Renick	Max Hirsch	Parker Corning	11/16 M	1:45.40

- † In 1951 there was a dead heat for first.
