= Philip H. Iselin Stakes =

Philip H. Iselin Handicap
- Class: Grade III
- Location: Monmouth Park Racetrack; Oceanport, New Jersey, USA
- Inaugurated: 1884
- Race type: Thoroughbred – Flat racing
- Website: www.monmouthpark.com

Race information
- Distance: 1 1/16 miles (8.5 furlongs)
- Surface: Dirt
- Track: Left-handed
- Qualification: Three-year-olds & up
- Weight: Handicap
- Purse: $100,000 (2016)

The Philip H. Iselin Stakes is an American Thoroughbred horse race held annually at Monmouth Park Racetrack in Oceanport, New Jersey. Open to horses three years of age and older, the race was first run in 1884. In 1891, New Jersey state legislators began a move to ban parimutuel betting and the race had to be moved to the Jerome Park Racetrack and the Morris Park Racetrack in The Bronx, New York. With a legislated permanent ban, after the 1893 running the Monmouth Park Racetrack was shut down and the property sold. In 1946 Thoroughbred racing returned to a new Monmouth Park facility, spurred on by the burgeoning American economy after the end of World War II.

From inception until 1966 the race was known as the Monmouth Handicap; then from 1967 through 1980 it was run as the Amory L. Haskell Handicap. In 1981 it reverted to the Monmouth Handicap name, then in 1986, it was given its present name to honor Philip H. Iselin, a founding shareholder and director of the Monmouth Park Racetrack who would serve as its president and chairman of the Board of directors.

Created in the 19th century, when most Thoroughbred horse races were run at much longer distances than they are today, the early Monmouth Handicaps were raced over a distance of 1 1/2 miles.

The Philip Iselin Stakes was the second leg of the Mid Atlantic Thoroughbred Championships Long Dirt Division or MATCh Races. MATCh is a series of five races in five separate thoroughbred divisions run throughout four Mid-Atlantic States including; Pimlico Race Course and Laurel Park Racecourse in Maryland; Delaware Park Racetrack in Delaware; Parx, Philadelphia Park and Presque Isle Downs in Pennsylvania and Monmouth Park in New Jersey. It held this distinction during the 2018 series.

Starting in 2023, the race has been run as part of the Breeders Cup Dirt Dozen racing series, providing bonuses for the top three finishing horses.

== Records ==
Time record (since 1979):

- 1 1/8 miles: 1:46.80 by Spend a Buck (1985), Jolie's Halo (1992)
- 1 1/16 miles: 1:40.20 Formal Gold (1997)

Most wins:

- 2 – West Coast Scout (1972, 1973)

Most wins by a jockey:

- 4 – Eddie Arcaro (1956, 1957, 1958, 1960)
- 4 – Bill Shoemaker (1959,1979, 1980, 1986)

Most wins by a trainer:

- 3 – James E. Fitzsimmons (1954, 1956, 1958)
- 3 – David Jacobson (2014, 2016, 2018)

Most wins by an owner:

- 2 – David Jacobson (2016, 2018)
- 2 – Oxford Stable (1972, 1973)
- 2 – James Ben Ali Haggin (1886, 1888)

== Winners ==
Year	Winner	Age	Jockey	Trainer	Owner	Dist. (Miles)	Time	Purse	Gr.
2026	Bishops Bay	6	Luis R. Rivera Jr.	Brad H. Cox	KAS Stables	1-1/16 m	1:41.92	$150,000	G3
2025	Surface to Air	5	Samuel Marin	Panagiotis Synnefias	Premier Stable	1-1/16 m	1:44.27	$245,000	G3
2024	Subsanador	5	Mike E. Smith	Richard E. Mandella	Wathnan Racing	1-1/16 m	1:42.63	$250,000	G3
2023	Whelen Springs	4	Jose C. Ferrer	Lindsay Schultz	Shortleaf Stable	1-1/16 m	1:44.35	$250,000	G3
2022	Informative	5	Dexter Haddock	Uriah St. Lewis	Trin-Brook Stables, Inc.	1-1/16 m	1:44.22	$250,000	G3
2021	Code of Honor	5	Paco Lopez	Claude R. McGaughey	William Farish	1-1/16 m	1:42.38	$252,000	G3
2020	Warrior's Charge	4	Paco Lopez	Brad H. Cox	Ten Strike Racing & Madaket Stables	1-1/16 m	1:43.37	$200,000	G3
2019	Monongahela	5	Jose Lezcano	Jason Servis	Michael Dubb, Bethlehem Stables, Gary Aisquith	1-1/16 m	1:42.45	$150,000	G3
2018	Harlan Punch	5	Joe Bravo	David Jacobson	David Jacobson	1-1/16 m	1:44.53	$100,000	G3
2017	Just Call Kenny	6	Eddie Castro	Patrick B. McBurney	Dominic Bossone, Peter D. Donnelly, James Cahill, ABL Stable, & Phantom House Farm	1-1/8 m	1:47.73	$100,000	G3
2016	Baccelo	6	Nik Juarez	David Jacobson	David Jacobson	1-1/8 m	1:48.55	$100,000	G3
2015	Valid	5	Nik Juarez	Marcus J. Vitali	Crossed Sabres Farm	1-1/8 m	1:50.14	$150,000	G3
2014	Balance of Power	4	Chuck Lopez	David Jacobson	Drawing Away Stable & David Jacobson	1-1/8 m	1:48.78	$150,000	G3
2013	Last Gunfighter	4	Joe Bravo	Chad C. Brown	John D. Gunther	1-1/8 m	1:52.03	$150,000	G3
2012	San Pablo	4	Christopher DeCarlo	Todd Pletcher	Burning Sands Stable	1-1/8 m	1:49.59	$150,000	G3
2011	Where's Sterling	4	Paco Lopez	Nick Canani	Frank Calabrese	1-1/8 m	1:48.57	$252,500	G3
2010	Duke of Mischief	4	Eibar Coa	David Fawkes	Alex & Joann Lieblong, Fawkes Racing, Marilyn McMaster	1-1/8 m	1:51.15	$300,000	G3
2009	Chirac	4	Elvis Trujillo	Jane Cibelli	Pia M. Kirkham	1-1/8 m	1:49.11	$300,000	G3
2008	Honest Man	4	Terry J. Thompson	J. Larry Jones	WinStar Farm & Foxhill Farms	1-1/8 m	1:49.12	$300,000	G3
2007	Gottcha Gold	4	Chuck Lopez	Edward Plesa Jr.	Centaur Farms Inc.	1-1/8 m	1:48.36	$300,000	G3
2006	Park Avenue Ball	4	Christopher DeCarlo	James T. Ryerson	Char-Mari Stable	1-1/8 m	1:49.73	$250,000	G3
2005	West Virginia	4	José A. Vélez Jr.	Todd Pletcher	Don & Roberta Zuckerman	1-1/8 m	1:50.83	$250,000	G3
2004	Ghostzapper	4	Javier Castellano	Robert J. Frankel	Stronach Stables	1-1/8 m	1:47.66	$200,000	G3
2003	Tenpins	5	Robby Albarado	Donald Winfree	Joseph V. Vitelli	1-1/8 m	1:50.20	$200,000	G3
2002	Cat's At Home	5	José A. Vélez Jr.	Mark A. Hennig	Edward P. Evans	1-1/8 m	1:49.00	$350,000	G2
2001	Broken Vow	4	Ramon Domínguez	H. Graham Motion	Pin Oak Stable	1-1/8 m	1:49.40	$350,000	G2
2000	Rize	4	José C. Ferrer	Norman R. Pointer	Runnin Horse Farm	1-1/8 m	1:48.40	$350,000	G2
1999	Frisk Me Now	5	Edwin L. King Jr.	Robert J. Durso	Carol R. Dender	1-1/8 m	1:49.20	$350,000	G2
1998	Skip Away	5	Jerry Bailey	Sonny Hine	Carolyn H. Hine	1-1/8 m	1:47.20	$500,000	G2
1997	Formal Gold	4	Kent Desormeaux	William W. Perry	John D. Murphy	1-1/16 m	1:40.20	$250,000	G2
1996	Smart Strike	4	Craig Perret	Mark Frostad	Sam-Son Farm	1-1/16 m	1:41.40	$300,000	G1
1995	Schossberg	5	Dave Penna	Phil England	Steve Stavro	1-1/8 m	1:49.20	$300,000	G1
1994	Taking Risks	4	Mark T. Johnston	King T. Leatherbury	Lakeville Stables	1-1/8 m	1:48.20	$250,000	G1
1993	Valley Crossing	5	Chris Antley	Richard W. Small	Robert E. Meyerhoff	1-1/8 m	1:49.20	$500,000	G1
1992	Jolie's Halo	5	Edgar Prado	Robert W. Camac	Arthur I. Appleton	1-1/8 m	1:46.80	$500,000	G1
1991	Black Tie Affair	5	Pat Day	Ernie T. Poulos	Jeff Sullivan	1-1/8 m	1:47.80	$500,000	G1
1990	Beau Genius	5	Ricardo Lopez	Gerald S. Bennett	Brian Davidson	1-1/8 m	1:48.20	$250,000	G1
1989	Proper Reality	4	Jerry Bailey	Robert E. Holthus	Juanita Winn	1-1/8 m	1:48.00	$250,000	G1
1988	Alysheba	4	Chris McCarron	Jack Van Berg	Dorothy & Pamela Scharbauer	1-1/8 m	1:47.80	$500,000	G1
1987	Bordeaux Bob	4	Chris Antley	D. Wayne Lukas	Mark Barge	1-1/8 m	1:48.20	$250,000	G1
1986	Roo Art	4	Bill Shoemaker	D. Wayne Lukas	Barbara Holleran	1-1/8 m	1:48.80	$250,000	G1
1985	Spend a Buck	3	Laffit Pincay Jr.	Cam Gambolati	Hunter Farm	1-1/8 m	1:46.80	$250,000	G1
1984	Believe The Queen	4	Donnie Miller Jr.	H. Allen Jerkens	Bohemia Stable	1-1/8 m	1:48.20	$250,000	G1
1983	Bates Motel	4	Terry Lipham	John Gosden	Jacqueline Getty	1-1/8 m	1:47.20	$250,000	G1
1982	Mehmet	4	Eddie Delahoussaye	Robert J. Frankel	A.J. Chlad, Sam Mevorach, Elizabeth Vallone	1-1/8 m	1:48.20	$250,000	G1
1981	Amber Pass	4	Cash Asmussen	Sonny Hine	Entremont Stable	1-1/8 m	1:47.40	$250,000	G1
1980	Spectacular Bid	4	Bill Shoemaker	Grover G. Delp	Hawksworth Farm	1-1/8 m	1:48.00	$250,000	G1
1979	Text	5	Bill Shoemaker	Vincent Clyne	Elmendorf Farm	1-1/8 m	1:47.40	$100,000	G1
1978	Life's Hope	5	Craig Perret	Laz Barrera	Harbor View Farm	1-1/4 m	2:03.20	$100,000	G1
1977	Majestic Light	4	Sandy Hawley	John W. Russell	Ogden Mills Phipps	1-1/4 m	2:00.40	$100,000	G1
1976	Hatchet Man	5	Vincent Bracciale Jr.	John M. Gaver Jr.	Greentree Stable	1-1/4 m	2:00.60	$100,000	G1
1975	Royal Glint	5	Craig Perret	Gordon R. Potter	Dan Lasater	1-1/4 m	2:00.60	$109,150	
1974	True Knight	5	Miguel A. Rivera	Lou Rondinello	Darby Dan Farm	1-1/4 m	2:02.00	$111,100	
1973	West Coast Scout	5	Larry Adams	Mervin Marks	Oxford Stable	1-1/4 m	2:01.20	$114,300	
1972	West Coast Scout	4	John L. Rotz	Mervin Marks	Oxford Stable	1-1/4 m	2:02.20	$113,500	
1971	Jontilla	4	John Giovanni	Alfred Cleff	William R. Kelly	1-1/4 m	2:01.00	$115,600	
1970	Gladwin	4	Heliodoro Gustines	Evan S. Jackson	Hastings Harcourt	1-1/4 m	2:02.60	$116,400	
1969	Verbatim	4	Pete Anderson	James P. Conway	Elmendorf Farm (Maxwell Gluck)	1-1/4 m	2:02.20	$113,800	
1968	Bold Hour	4	William Boland	Sylvester Veitch	George D. Widener Jr.	1-1/4 m	2:03.00	$111,000	
1967	Handsome Boy	4	Jacinto Vásquez	H. Allen Jerkens	Hobeau Farm	1-1/4 m	2:02.00	$112,400	
1966	Bold Bidder	4	Pete D. Anderson	Woody Stephens	John R. Gaines	1-1/4 m	2:03.60	$114,450	
1965	Repeating	4	Hedley Woodhouse	Lucien Laurin	Mrs. Lucien Laurin	1-1/4 m	2:04.20	$108,300	
1964	Mongo	5	Wayne Chambers	Frank A. Bonsal	Montpelier	1-1/4 m	2:01.80	$107,500	
1963	Decidedly	4	Manuel Ycaza	Horatio Luro	El Peco Ranch	1-1/4 m	2:02.00	$111,300	
1962	Carry Back	4	John L. Rotz	Jack A. Price	Katherine Price	1-1/4 m	2:00.40	$109,150	
1961	Don Poggio	5	Sam Boulmetis Sr.	Pancho Martin	Gustave Ring	1-1/4 m	2:02.40	$122,300	
1960	First Landing	4	Eddie Arcaro	Casey Hayes	Meadow Stable	1-1/4 m	2:02.80	$112,000	
1959	Sword Dancer	3	Bill Shoemaker	J. Elliott Burch	Brookmeade Stable	1-1/4 m	2:05.00	$113,750	
1958	Bold Ruler	4	Eddie Arcaro	James E. Fitzsimmons	Wheatley Stable	1-1/4 m	2:01.60	$110,650	
1957	Dedicate	5	Eddie Arcaro	G. Carey Winfrey	Jan Burke	1-1/4 m	2:01.80	$113,500	
1956	Nashua	4	Eddie Arcaro	James E. Fitzsimmons	Leslie Combs II	1-1/4 m	2:02.80	$114,400	
1955	Helioscope	4	Sam Boulmetis Sr.	Howard Hausner	William G. Helis Jr.	1-1/4 m	2:02.20	$83,550	
1954	Bassanio	4	Sidney Cole	James E. Fitzsimmons	Ogden Phipps	1-1/4 m	2:02.20	$58,800	
1953	My Celeste	7	Logan Batcheller	William S. Cotton	Constance Morabito	1-1/4 m	2:05.20	$34,350	
1952	One Hitter	6	Ted Atkinson	John M. Gaver Sr.	Greentree Stable	1-1/4 m	2:04.20	$28,050	
1951	Arise	5	Sam Boulmetis Sr.	James C. Bentley	Addison Stable (Harry Addison Sr.)	1-1/4 m	2:04.80	$28,500	
1950	Greek Ship	3	Joe Culmone	Preston M. Burch	Brookmeade Stable	1-1/4 m	2:02.40	$30,500	
1949	Three Rings	4	Hedley Woodhouse	Willie Knapp	Evelyn L. Hopkins	1-1/4 m	2:03.60	$29,500	
1948	Tide Rips	4	Porter Roberts	William L. Passmore	Bayard Sharp	1-1/4 m	2:03.20	$29,150	
1947	Round View	4	Louis F. Hildebrandt	Hollie Hughes	Sanford Stud Farms	1-1/4 m	2:01.20	$29,000	
1946	Lucky Draw	5	Conn McCreary	Bert Mulholland	George D. Widener Jr.	1-1/4 m	2:01.80	$22,970	
1894	1945	Race not held							
1893	Gloaming	6	Alonzo Clayton	Harry M. Mason	John G. Follansbee	1-1/2 m	2:33.00	$3,955	
1892	Reckon	4	William Penn	R. Wyndham Walden	John A. & Alfred H. Morris	1-1/2 m	2:33.50	$3,770	
1891	Banquet	4	John Lamley	Hardy Campbell Jr.	Michael F. Dwyer	1-1/2 m	2:40.00	$5,055	
1890	Tea Tray	5	James J. Moore	William Lakeland	William Lakeland	1-1/2 m	2:34.00	$5,335	
1889	Eurus	6	William Hayward	John Huggins	Alexander Cassatt	1-1/2 m	2:50.00	$4,715	
1888	Firenze	4	Edward Garrison	Matthew Byrnes	James Ben Ali Haggin	1-1/2 m	2:36.00	$5,385	
1887	Kaloolah	4	George Church	James Murphy	J. D. Morrissey	1-1/2 m	2:42.25	$3,570	
1886	Hidalgo	4	John Spellman	Matthew Byrnes	James Ben Ali Haggin	1-1/2 m	2:39.50	$3,570	
1885	Richmond	3	Jim McLaughlin	Frank McCabe	Dwyer Brothers Stable	1-1/2 m	2:38.50	$4,025	
1884	Drake Carter	4	William Hayward Sr.	Green B. Morris	Green B. Morris & James D. Patton	1-1/2 m	2:37.75	$3,460	
