= Sanford Stakes =

- Class: Grade III
- Location: Saratoga Race Course; Saratoga Springs, New York, United States
- Inaugurated: 1913
- Race type: Thoroughbred – Flat racing
- Website: www.nyra.com/index saratoga

Race information
- Distance: 6 furlong sprint
- Surface: Dirt
- Track: Left-handed
- Qualification: Two-year-olds
- Weight: 122 lbs. with 2 lbs. allowance for maidens
- Purse: US$225,000 (2026)

The Sanford Stakes is an American Thoroughbred horse race held annually during the third week of July at the Saratoga Race Course in Saratoga Springs, New York. A six furlong sprint race, the Grade III event is open to two-year-old horses.

Inaugurated in 1913 as the Sanford Memorial Stakes, it was modified to its present name in 1927. The race is named for Stephen Sanford and his son John, Amsterdam, New York businessmen from one of Saratoga's original horse racing families. Their horses first appeared in the Saratoga races in 1880. Stephen Sanford named all his best horses after members of the Mohawk nation.

The race was hosted by Belmont Park from 1943 through 1945. It was contested at 5 1/2 furlongs from 1962 through 1968. Held for almost a hundred years, the only three years in which it did not take place was 1961, 2005, and 2020.

Only four horses have ever won all three Saratoga Racecourse events for two-year-olds. Regret (1914), Campfire (1916), Dehere (1993), and City Zip (2000) each swept the Sanford Stakes, Saratoga Special Stakes, and Hopeful Stakes.

It was in the seventh running of the Sanford in 1919 that Man o' War lost his only race to the Harry Payne Whitney colt, Upset.

This race was downgraded to a Grade III for its 2014 running.

== Records ==
Speed record: (at current distance of 6 furlongs)

- 1:09.32 – Afleet Alex (2004)

Most wins by a jockey:

- 7 – John Velazquez (1999, 2001, 2003, 2006, 2007, 2011, 2015)

Most wins by a Trainer

- 8 –Todd A. Pletcher (1999, 2003, 2006, 2007, 2011, 2015, 2018, 2021)

Most wins by an owner:

- 8 – Greentree Stable (1933, 1941, 1950, 1951, 1956, 1959, 1963, 1978)

== Winners ==
Year	Winner	Jockey	Trainer	Owner	Time
2026	Booked	Ricardo Santana Jr.	Steven M. Asmussen	Jackpot Farm, Alvin Fultus, Jason Itkin & Michael D. Smith	1:11.24
2025	Obliteration	Flavien Prat	Steven M. Asmussen	Leland Ackerley Racing	1:10.65
2024	Mo Plex	Irad Ortiz Jr.	Jeremiah C. Englehart	R and H Stable	1:11.72
2023	Yo Yo Candy	Angel Castillo	Daniel Velazquez	Happy Tenth Stable	1:11.83
2022	Mo Strike	Florent Geroux	Brad H. Cox	Nasser Bin Omairah	1:11.35
2021	Wit	Irad Ortiz Jr.	Todd A. Pletcher	Repole Stable, St. Elias Stable, & Gainesway Farm	1:11.12
2019	By Your Side	Irad Ortiz Jr.	Eddie Kenneally	Anderson Stables, LLC	1:10.22
2018	Sombeyay	Javier Castellano	Todd A. Pletcher	Starlight Racing	1:10.35
2017	Firenze Fire	Irad Ortiz Jr.	Jason Servis	Mr. Amore Stable	1:11.50
2016	Bitumen	Javier Castellano	Eddie Kenneally	Joseph W. Sutton	1:10.68
2015	Uncle Vinny	John Velazquez	Todd A. Pletcher	Starlight Racing	1:10.92
2014	Big Trouble	Irad Ortiz Jr.	Anthony W. Dutrow	Team D	1:10.64
2013	Wired Bryan	Shaun Bridgmohan	Michael Dilger	Anstu Stables	1:11.06
2012	Bern Identity	Rosie Napravnik	Kelly J. Breen	George & Lori Hall	1:11.13
2011	Overdriven	John Velazquez	Todd A. Pletcher	Repole Stable	1:10.60
2010	Maybesomaybenot	Elvis Trujillo	Michael J. Maker	Carolyn Scisney & Karen Scisney	1:10.97
2009	Backtalk	Miguel Mena	Thomas M. Amoss	GoldMark Farm	1:10.07
2008	Desert Party	Edgar Prado	Eoin G. Harty	Darley Stable	1:12.23
2007	Ready's Image	John Velazquez	Todd A. Pletcher	James T. Scatuorchio	1:09.90
2006	Scat Daddy	John Velazquez	Todd A. Pletcher	James T. Scatuorchio	1:11.18
2005	no race				
2004	Afleet Alex	Jeremy Rose	Timothy F. Ritchey	Cash is King Stable	1:09.32
2003	Chapel Royal	John Velazquez	Todd A. Pletcher	Derrick Smith & Michael Tabor	1:10.74
2002	Whywhywhy	Edgar Prado	Patrick Biancone	Biancone and Ouaki	1:10.40
2001	Buster's Daydream	John Velazquez	Timothy J. Tullock Jr.	S J Bee Stable	1:10.55
2000	City Zip	José A. Santos	Linda L. Rice	Bowling & Thompson	1:10.69
1999	More Than Ready	John Velazquez	Todd A. Pletcher	James T. Scatuorchio	1:09.65
1998	Time Bandit	Pat Day	D. Wayne Lukas	Padua Stables	1:11.40
1997	Polished Brass	Pat Day	Patrick B. Byrne	Joseph LaCombe	1:10.23
1996	Kelly Kip	Jean-Luc Samyn	H. Allen Jerkens	Hobeau Farm	1:10.20
1995	Maria's Mon	Robbie Davis	Richard E. Schosberg	Mrs. Morton Rosenthal	1:10.80
1994	Montreal Red	José A. Santos	Flint S. Schulhofer	Vendome Stables	1:10.56
1993	Dehere	Chris McCarron	Reynaldo H. Nobles	Due Process Stable	1:10.48
1992	Mountain Cat	Pat Day	D. Wayne Lukas	William T. Young	1:10.60
1991	Caller I. D.	Jerry D. Bailey	Stanley M. Hough	Triumviri Stable	1:10.92
1990	Formal Dinner	José A. Santos	D. Wayne Lukas	Leonard D. Mathis	1:10.20
1989	Bite The Bullet	José A. Santos	D. Wayne Lukas	Eugene V. Klein	1:09.80
1988	Mercedes Won	Robbie Davis	Arnold Fink	Christopher Spencer	1:10.00
1987	Forty Niner	Eddie Maple	Woody Stephens	Claiborne Farm	1:10.00
1986	Persevered	Ángel Cordero Jr.	Laz Barrera	Ethel D. Jacobs	1:10.60
1985	Sovereign Don	Jorge Velásquez	D. Wayne Lukas	Eugene V. Klein	1:10.60
1984	Tiffany Ice	Gregg McCarron	Joseph B. Cantey	Mrs. Charles H. Thieriot	1:10.80
1983	Big Walt	Jeffrey Fell	Joseph Nash	Grandview Stable	1:11.00
1982	Copelan	Jerry D. Bailey	Mitchell Griffin	Fred W. Hooper	1:10.40
1981	Mayanesian	Jacinto Vásquez	Nick Zito	Ernest B. Wright	1:11.20
1980	Tap Shoes	Ruben Hernandez	Howard M. Tesher	Leone J. Peters	1:10.00
1979	I Speedup	Jeffrey Fell	Edward I. Kelly Sr.	Brookfield Farm	1:10.40
1978	Fuzzbuster	Jorge Velásquez	John M. Gaver Jr.	Greentree Stable	1:10.80
1977	Affirmed	Steve Cauthen	Laz Barrera	Harbor View Farm	1:09.60
1976	Turn Of Coin	Ángel Cordero Jr.	William O. Hicks	William O. Hicks	1:10.20
1975	Turn To Turia	Eddie Maple	Reggie Cornell	Calumet Farm	1:10.80
1974	Ramahorn	Chuck Baltazar	Pancho Martin	Sigmund Sommer	1:11.00
1973	Az Igazi	Michael Venezia	Homer C. Pardue	Joseph R. Straus	1:10.60
1972	Secretariat	Ron Turcotte	Lucien Laurin	Meadow Stable	1:10.00
1971	Cohasset Tribe	Manuel Ycaza	Woody Stephens	Louis L. Haggin II	1:10.60
1970	Executioner	Jacinto Vásquez	Edward J. Yowell	October House Farm	1:09.40
1969	Walker's	Ángel Cordero Jr.	Frank I. Wright	Oxford Stable	1:10.40
1968	King Emperor	Braulio Baeza	Edward A. Neloy	Wheatley Stable	1:03.40
1967	Exclusive Native	Ángel Cordero Jr.	Ivan H. Parke	Harbor View Farm	1:03.60
1966	Yorkville	John L. Rotz	Sylvester Veitch	George D. Widener Jr.	1:05.00
1965	Flame Tree	Bobby Ussery	Buddy Jacobson	Samuel J. Lefrak	1:04.60
1964	Cornish Prince	Donald Pierce	Sylvester Veitch	George D. Widener Jr.	1:04.40
1963	Delirium	Braulio Baeza	John M. Gaver Sr.	Greentree Stable	1:05.40
1962	Rash Prince	Ismael Valenzuela	Walter A. Kelley	Elmendorf Farm	1:04.60
1961	no race				
1960	Hail To Reason	Bobby Ussery	Hirsch Jacobs	Patrice Jacobs	1:11.00
1959	Weatherwise	John Ruane	John M. Gaver Sr.	Greentree Stable	1:12.40
1958	Pilot	Eddie Arcaro	William O. Hicks	Cambridge Stable	1:13.40
1957	Louis d'Or	Raul Sterling	Jake Byer	Mrs. W. Thorn Kissel	1:13.20
1956	Thin Ice	Ted Atkinson	John M. Gaver Sr.	Greentree Stable	1:12.60
1955	Head Man	Paul J. Bailey	Sylvester Veitch	C. V. Whitney	1:11.80
1954	Brother Tex	Conn McCreary	Woody Stephens	Woody Stephens	1:12.80
1953	Bobby Brocato	Ovie Scurlock	John B. Theall	Joe W. Brown	1:13.20
1952	Bradley	Jimmy Nichols	William Post	Hope Goddard Iselin	1:14.60
1951	Tom Fool	Ted Atkinson	John M. Gaver Sr.	Greentree Stable	1:12.60
1950	Big Stretch	Eddie Arcaro	John M. Gaver Sr.	Greentree Stable	1:11.60
1949	Detective	Ted Atkinson	George P. "Maj" Odom	Mrs. Aksel Wichfield	1:12.80
1948	Slam Bang	Warren Mehrtens	Morris H. Dixon	C. Mahlon Kline	1:12.00
1947	Inseparable	Job Dean Jessop	Preston M. Burch	Brookmeade Stable	1:11.80
1946	Donor	Job Dean Jessop	George P. "Maj" Odom	W. Deering Howe	1:11.60
1945	Pellicle	Conn McCreary	Knox Osborne	Hal Price Headley	1:10.80
1944	The Doge	Ferrill Zufelt	Frank A. Bonsal	Pentagon Stable	1:10.40
1943	Rodney Stone	Ted Atkinson	Preston M. Burch	Harry La Montagne	1:11.20
1942	Devil's Thumb	Conn McCreary	Cecil Wilhelm	William E. Boeing	1:12.80
1941	Devil Diver	Don Meade	John M. Gaver Sr.	Greentree Stable	1:12.80
1940	Good Turn	Basil James	Lee McCoy	Alfred G. Vanderbilt II	1:13.20
1939	Boy Angler	Fred A. Smith	William A. Hurley	Mr. French †	1:12.20
1938	Birch Rod †	Wayne D. Wright	Bert Mulholland	George D. Widener Jr.	1:14.20
1937	Spillway	Danny Dubois	John B. Theall	Joe W. Brown	1:14.00
1936	Maedic	Eddie Litzenberger	George E. Phillips	Maemere Farm	1:13.00
1935	Crossbow II	Eddie Arcaro	Frank J. Kearns	Calumet Farm	1:12.40
1934	Psychic Bid	Mack Garner	Robert A. Smith	Brookmeade Stable	1:12.20
1933	First Ministrel	Robert Jones	William Brennan	Greentree Stable	1:15.00
1932	Sun Archer	Raymond Workman	Jack Whyte	Willis Sharpe Kilmer	1:12.80
1931	Mad Pursuit	Thomas Malley	Jack R. Pryce	Walter J. Salmon Sr.	1:12.20
1930	Sun Meadow	Eddie Watters	Tommy Rodrock	Katherine E. Hitt	1:12.60
1929	Hi-Jack	Linus McAtee	A. Jack Joyner	George D. Widener Jr.	1:12.00
1928	Chestnut Oak	James H. Burke	Johnny Loftus	Oak Ridge Stable	1:13.00
1927	Nassak	Laverne Fator	Sam Hildreth	Rancocas Stable	1:12.60
1926	Northland	John Maiben	Thomas J. Healey	Walter J. Salmon Sr.	1:13.00
1925	Canter	Clarence Turner	Harry Rites	J. Edwin Griffith	1:12.60
1924	Nicholas	Linus McAtee	William J. Knapp	Frank J. Farrell	1:15.60
1923	Parasol	Earl Sande	A. Jack Joyner	George D. Widener Jr.	1:12.80
1922	Bo McMillan	Fred A. Smith	Louis Cahn	Thomas J. Pendergast	1:18.00
1921	Sir Hugh	Mack Garner	J. Cal Milam	Johnson N. Camden Jr.	1:13.00
1920	Pluribus	José Rodriguez	Thomas J. Shannon	Thomas W. O'Brien	1:15.20
1919	Upset	Willie Knapp	James G. Rowe Sr.	Harry Payne Whitney	1:11.20
1918	Billy Kelly	Earl Sande	H. Guy Bedwell	J. K. L. Ross	1:14.60
1917	Papp	Lawrence Allen	Max Hirsch	George W. Loft	1:15.60
1916	Campfire	John McTaggart	Thomas J. Healey	Richard T. Wilson Jr.	1:13.40
1915	Bulse	Carl Ganz	not found	James W. Parrish	1:16.80
1914	Regret	Joe Notter	James G. Rowe Sr.	Harry Payne Whitney	1:13.40
1913	Little Nephew	Theo Killingworth	Elza Brown	Michael B. Gruber	1:14.80

* † In 1938, Ariel Toy finished first, but was disqualified. † In 1939 the niece of Edward R. Bradley raced Boy Angler under the nom de course "Mr. French."
