= John Gaver =

John Gaver may refer to:

- John M. Gaver Sr., American racehorse trainer
- John M. Gaver Jr., his son, American racehorse trainer
