= American Legion Handicap =

- Class: Discontinued stakes
- Location: Saratoga Race Course, Saratoga Springs, New York
- Inaugurated: 1927
- Race type: Thoroughbred - Flat racing

Race information
- Distance: 7 furlongs
- Surface: Dirt
- Track: left-handed
- Qualification: Three-year-olds and up
- Purse: $20,000 added

The American Legion Handicap was an American Thoroughbred horse race at Saratoga Race Course in Saratoga Springs, New York open to horses of either sex age three and older. It was contested over a distance of seven furlongs on dirt, except for 1948 and 1949 when it was set at one mile (8 furlongs). The race was run for thirty-two years from 1927 through 1948.

== Historical notes ==
The inaugural running took place on August 6, 1927 and was won Cheops, a three-year-old brown colt owned by the very prominent Rancocas Stable. The race was created to honor American war veterans but during World War II also became a fund raising event to support the war effort. In 1943 government wartime restrictions meant the race had to be hosted that year by the Belmont Park racetrack in Elmont, New York.

During the July 26, 1937 racing program that included the American Legion Handicap, tragedy struck the Saratoga facilities when, during a severe electrical storm, a bolt of lightning killed one horse and knocked eight others unconscious. The lightning struck the barn housing Thoroughbreds owned by King Ranch plus those of Anna Corning. The lightning then hit a stall killing the two-year-old filly Gino Vive belonging to Willis Sharpe Kilmer.

The 1938 race was won by Alfred G. Vanderbilt Jr.'s Airflame whose winning time broke an eighteen-year-old track record.

The Canadian owned Arise, who had traveled to Saratoga in 1949 and won the prestigious Travers Stakes, returned to win the 1950 running of the American Legion Handicap and would go on to a career that would see him inducted into the Canadian Horse Racing Hall of Fame in 1983.

The thirty-second and final running of the American Legion Handicap took place on August 8, 1958. On a sloppy racetrack, the five-year-old horse Reneged easily won by five lengths, beating eight other runners.

== Records ==
Speed record:

- 1:22.20 @ 7 furlongs : Greek Warrior (1945)

Most wins:

- 2 - Microphone (1932, 1933)
- 2 - Nedayr (1939, 1940)
- 2 - Tea-Maker (1951, 1952)

Most wins by a jockey:

- 3 - Hedley Woodhouse (1952, 1954, 1956)

Most wins by a trainer:

- 3 - Phillip M. Walker (1932, 1933, 1935)

Most wins by an owner:

- 3 - Joseph E. Widener (1928, 1930, 1941)
- 3 - Greentree Stable (1934, 1944, 1955)
- 3 - Alfred G. Vanderbilt Jr. (1936, 1938, 1940)

== Winners ==
Year	Winner	Age	Jockey	Trainer	Owner	Dist. (Miles)	Time
1958	Reneged	5	Bobby Ussery	Homer C. Pardue	Woodley Lane Farm (Steven Wilson, Joseph Strauss, Lafayette Ward)	7 F	1:24.00
1957	Ricci Tavi	4	Eldon Nelson	Henry S. Clark	Christiana Stables	7 F	1:25.00
1956	Ambergris	4	Hedley Woodhouse	Winbert F. Mulholland	George D. Widener Jr.	7 F	1:24.80
1955	Gold Box	3	Ted Atkinson	John M. Gaver Sr.	Greentree Stable	7 F	1:24.80
1954	Fisherman	3	Hedley Woodhouse	Sylvester E. Veitch	Cornelius Vanderbilt Whitney	7 F	1:24.00
1953	Eatontown	7	Bennie Green	Hugh Dufford	Betty Block Roberts	7 F	1:25.00
1952	Tea-Maker	9	Hedley Woodhouse	J. Dallet Byers	F. Ambrose Clark	7 F	1:25.60
1951	Tea-Maker	8	Warren Mehrtens	J. Dallet Byers	F. Ambrose Clark	7 F	1:25.40
1950	Arise	4	Robert Permane	James C. Bentley	Addison Stable (Harry Addison, Sr. & W. A. "Jack" Addison)	7 F	1:23.60
1949	Manyunk	4	Gordon Glisson	George E. Roberts	Henry W. Collins	7 F	1:25.40
1948	Miss Disco	4	Eric Guerin	Anthony Pascuma	Sydney S. Schupper	7 F	1:25.60
1947	Pujante	6	Ruperto Donoso	Horatio Luro	W. Arnold Hanger	7 F	1:24.40
1946	Scholarship	4	Arnold Kirkland	Kenneth L. W. Force Jr.	George G. Gilbert Jr.	7 F	1:23.40
1945	Greek Warrior	3	Johnny Longden	William M. Booth	William G. Helis Sr.	7 F	1:22.20
1944	Devil Diver	5	Eddie Arcaro	John M. Gaver Sr.	Greentree Stable	7 F	1:23.60
1943	With Regards	4	Johnny Longden	Ted D. Grimes	Josephine Grimes	7 F	1:23.80
1942	Scotland Light	3	Conn McCreary	Eddie Hayward	Barrington Stable (Thomas M. Howell)	7 F	1:24.20
1941	Roman	4	Don Meade	Daniel E. Stewart	Joseph E. Widener	7 F	1:25.00
1940	Nedayr	5	Basil James	Lee McCoy	Alfred G. Vanderbilt Jr.	7 F	1:23.60
1939	Nedayr	4	George Seabo	William A. Crawford	Willis Sharpe Kilmer	7 F	1:24.00
1938	Airflame	4	Lee Fallon	Joseph H. Stotler	Alfred G. Vanderbilt Jr.	7 F	1:23.20
1937	Jay Jay	4	Harry Richards	Frank Garrett	Howard Bruce	7 F	1:25.40
1936	Good Gamble	4	Lee Fallon	Joseph H. Stotler	Alfred G. Vanderbilt Jr.	7 F	1:24.20
1935	Only One	4	Robert Merritt	Phillip M. Walker	Mrs. W. Deering Howe	7 F	1:25.00
1934	Black Buddy	3	Silvio Coucci	William Brennan	Greentree Stable	7 F	1:24.80
1933	Microphone	4	Silvio Coucci	Phillip M. Walker	Sage Stable (Harry W. Sage)	7 F	1:27.20
1932	Microphone	3	John Gilbert	Phillip M. Walker	Sage Stable (Harry W. Sage)	7 F	1:27.20
1931	Con Amore	4	Pat Remillard	William Irvine	John William Young "J. W. Y." Martin	7 F	1:24.00
1930	Mr. Sponge	3	Mack Garner	Peter W. Coyne	Joseph E. Widener	7 F	1:24.20
1929	Buddy Bauer	5	Mack Garner	Herbert J. Thompson	Idle Hour Stock Farm	8 F	1:36.60
1928	Osmand	4	Earl Sande	Peter W. Coyne	Joseph E. Widener	8 F	1:39.20
1927	Cheops	3	Frank Catrone	Sam Hildreth	Rancocas Stable	7 F	1:25.40
