= Sysonby Handicap =

- Class: Discontinued stakes
- Location: Belmont Park; Elmont, New York, United States
- Inaugurated: 1946
- Race type: Thoroughbred - Flat racing

Race information
- Surface: Dirt
- Track: left-handed
- Qualification: Three years old & up
- Weight: weight-for-age

The Sysonby Handicap was an American Thoroughbred horse race first run in 1946 at Belmont Park in Elmont, New York. Placed on hiatus after the 1959 edition, the race was revived in 1967 at Aqueduct Racetrack where it was run one last time. An event for horses of either sex age three and older, it was run on dirt over a distance of a mile through 1958 then the following year increased to a mile and a quarter. For the final running in 1967 it became a sprint race of seven furlongs.

The race was named in honor of U. S. Racing Hall of Fame inductee Sysonby who was selected #30 - Top 100 U.S. Racehorses of the 20th Century.

== Historical race notes ==
Lucky Draw won the 1946 inaugural running in a year in which he set six track records including equaling a World record. He won the Sysonby by 10 lengths and although it was run over a muddy racetrack, it was still in a fast time.

Other notable Sysonby Handicap winners were four American Horse of the Year and U.S. Racing Hall of Fame inductees Armed, Triple Crown winner Citation, and Tom Fool. In addition, Canadian Horse Racing Hall of Fame inductee Arise won this race.

== Records ==
Speed record:

- 1:35.00 @ 1 mile : Cohoes (1958)

Most wins:

- Tom Fool (1952, 1953)
- High Gun (1954, 1955)

Most wins by a jockey:

- 3 - Ted Atkinson (1949, 1952, 1953)

Most wins by a trainer:

- 4 - John M. Gaver Sr. (1949, 1952, 1953, 1958)

Most wins by an owner:

- 4 - Greentree Stable (1949, 1952, 1953, 1958)

== Winners ==
| Year | Winner | Age | Jockey | Trainer | Owner | Dist. (Furlongs) | Time |
|---|---|---|---|---|---|---|---|
| 1967 | R. Thomas | 6 | Jimmy Nichols | David Erb | Roger W. Wilson | 7 F | 1:26.00 |
| 1960 | 1966 | Race not held | | | | | |
| 1959 | The Irishman | 3 | Bobby Ussery | James E. Fitzsimmons | Wheatley Stable | 10 F | 2:02.00 |
| 1958 | Cohoes | 4 | John Ruane | John M. Gaver Sr. | Greentree Stable | 8 F | 1:35.00 |
| 1957 | Tick Tock | 3 | Bill Boland | Edward A. Christmas | Howell E. Jackson | 8 F | 1:36.20 |
| 1956 | Jet Action | 5 | Walter Blum | Lawrence W. Kidd | Maine Chance Farm | 8 F | 1:35.20 |
| 1955 | High Gun | 4 | Bill Boland | Max Hirsch | King Ranch | 9 F | 1:49.20 |
| 1954 | High Gun | 3 | Eddie Arcaro | Max Hirsch | King Ranch | 8 F | 1:36.60 |
| 1953 | Tom Fool | 4 | Ted Atkinson | John M. Gaver Sr. | Greentree Stable | 8 F | 1:36.80 |
| 1952 | Tom Fool | 3 | Ted Atkinson | John M. Gaver Sr. | Greentree Stable | 8 F | 1:36.40 |
| 1951 | Miche | 6 | Conn McCreary | Eddie Hayward | Muriel Vanderbilt Adams | 8 F | 1:35.40 |
| 1950 | Arise | 4 | Douglas Dodson | James C. Bentley | Addison Stable (Harry Addison) | 8 F | 1:36.40 |
| 1949 | Capot | 3 | Ted Atkinson | John M. Gaver Sr. | Greentree Stable | 8 F | 1:35.60 |
| 1948 | Citation | 3 | Eddie Arcaro | Jimmy Jones | Calumet Farm | 8 F | 1:36.00 |
| 1947 | Armed | 6 | Albert Snider | Jimmy Jones | Calumet Farm | 8 F | 1:36.00 |
| 1946 | Lucky Draw | 5 | Conn McCreary | Bert Mulholland | George D. Widener Jr. | 8 F | 1:35.60 |
