= Robert Permane =

American singer and jockey

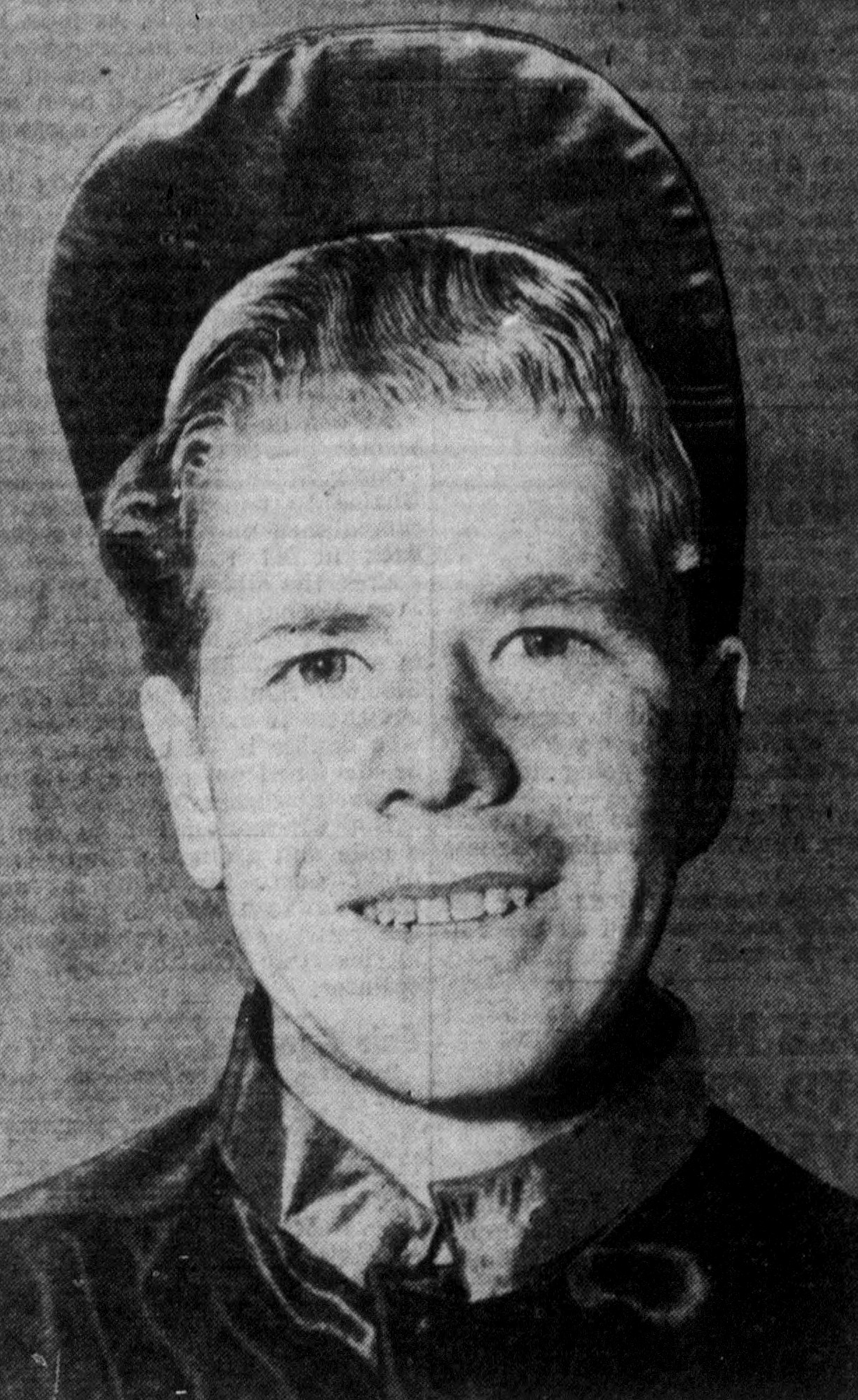
- Permane, circa 1947–48

Personal information
- Born: January 21, 1924 Camden, New Jersey, US
- Died: October 24, 2017 (aged 93) Bradenton, Florida, US
- Occupations: Singer, jockey

Horse racing career
- Sport: Horse racing
- Career wins: 1,121

Major racing wins
- Champagne Stakes (1944); Champlain Handicap (1944); Demoiselle Stakes (1944); Jockey Club Gold Cup (1944); Saratoga Cup (1944); Tropical Handicap (1944); Brooklyn Handicap (1945); Butler Handicap (1945, 1948); Delaware Handicap (1945); Grey Lag Handicap (1945); Westchester Handicap (1945); San Pasqual Handicap (1946); Santa Anita Derby (1946); Hollywood Gold Cup (1947); Sunset Handicap (1947); Aqueduct Handicap (1948); Gazelle Stakes (1948); Prioress Stakes (1948); Santa Anita Oaks (1948); Tremont Stakes (1948); Alabama Stakes (1950); American Legion Handicap (1950); Endurance Handicap (1951); Royal Palm Handicap (1954)

Significant horses
- Arise, Bolingbroke, Busanda, Cover Up, Donor, Knockdown, Stymie

Robert Constantin Permane (January 21, 1924 – October 24, 2017) was an American Thoroughbred horse racing jockey whose successful career included riding future Hall of Fame inductee Stymie to thirteen wins. Fittingly, in 1951 Permane won the Stymie Purse at Bowie Race Track in Maryland.

== Entertainment career ==
Robert Permane was born in Camden, New Jersey, to parents who were vaudeville performers. At age eight he was competing in equestrian events for ponies. Prior to embarking on his career as a jockey in Thoroughbred racing he had success as a singer, performing on radio and touring the United States and Australia.

== Jockey career ==
In August 1943 Permane made his professional riding debut at Garden State Park Racetrack in Cherry Hill, New Jersey, where on August 31 he earned his first win. The following year he was the leading jockey at Tropical Park Race Track in Miami, Florida. In April, during the track's 1944 spring meet, Permane rode a record five winners three days in a row. Permane was also second in total wins in New York State in 1944 and third in 1948. He was severely injured in March 1949 in a racing accident at Gulfstream Park which would require eight operations that put him out of racing for fifteen months, not returning until June 3, 1950.

Among his other major successes, Robert Permane won the 1944 Jockey Club Gold Cup aboard Bolingbroke, and the 1946 Santa Anita Derby for Maine Chance Farm aboard Knockdown. Then, in the U.S. Triple Crown races, he rode Knockdown to a fifth-place finish in the 1946 Kentucky Derby and to fourth in the Preakness Stakes. In 1947 Permane won the Hollywood Gold Cup and Sunset Handicap aboard Cover Up and in 1950 rode the filly Busanda to victory in the Alabama Stakes.

When his racing career was over, Robert Permane and his wife made their home in Florida where they built Carlyn Estates Trailer Park in Palmetto. He died on October 24, 2017, at age 93.
