= Artax =

Artax may refer to:

- Artax, the horse belonging to the main character Atreyu in the children's fantasy novel The Neverending Story
- Artax (horse), an American Champion Thoroughbred racehorse named after the fictional character

== See also ==
- Nova Artax, an Austrian paraglider design
