= One-hitter =

One-hitter may refer to:

- One-hitter (baseball), a baseball game in which one team was limited to one hit
- One-hitter (smoking), a type of smoking apparatus

== See also ==
- One Hitter, a racehorse
