= Casey Hayes =

American racehorse trainer

Personal information
- Born: June 16, 1906 Brevard, North Carolina
- Died: June 25, 1980 (aged 74) Dade County, Florida
- Occupation: Trainer

Horse racing career
- Sport: Horse racing
- Career wins: 550+

Major racing wins
- Cowdin Stakes (1949); Fleetwing Handicap (1949); American Derby (1950); Jerome Stakes (1950); Jockey Club Gold Cup (1950); Sunset Handicap (1950); Withers Stakes (1950); Wood Memorial Stakes (1950); Aqueduct Handicap (1951, 1952); New York Stakes (1951); Pimlico Special (1951); Questionnaire Handicap (1951); Westchester Handicap (1951); San Marcos Stakes (1952); Astoria Stakes (1955); Gazelle Stakes (1955); Ladies Handicap (1955); Vagrancy Handicap (1955, 1963); Long Island Handicap (1956); Roamer Handicap (1956); Coaching Club American Oaks (1957); Molly Pitcher Stakes (1957); Champagne Stakes (1958); Garden State Stakes (1958); Great American Stakes (1958, 1961); Hopeful Stakes (1958); Juvenile Stakes (1958, 1968); Saratoga Special Stakes (1958); Schuylerville Stakes (1958, 1961); Selima Stakes (1958, 1967); Spinaway Stakes (1958, 1961, 1968); Derby Trial Stakes (1959); Everglades Stakes (1959, 1962); Monmouth Handicap (1960); Prioress Stakes (1960, 1963); Strub Stakes (1960); National Stallion Stakes (1961); Tyro Stakes (1961); Astarita Stakes (1961); Blue Hen Stakes (1961); Frizette Stakes (1961); Gardenia Stakes (1961, 1966, 1967); Matron Stakes (1961, 1963); National Stallion Stakes (1961); National Stallion Stakes (filly division) (1961, 1967); Sapling Stakes (1961); Acorn Stakes (1962); Bahamas Stakes (1962); Beldame Stakes (1962); Jersey Belle Stakes (1962); Kentucky Oaks (1962); Mother Goose Stakes (1962); Oaks Prep (1962); Stepping Stone Purse (1962); Columbiana Handicap (1963); Distaff Handicap (1963); Sheepshead Bay Stakes (1963); Sorority Stakes (1964); Demoiselle Stakes (1968); Fashion Stakes (1966); Youthful Stakes (1970) American Classic Race wins: Preakness Stakes (1950)

Significant horses
- Bryan G., Beaugay Cicada, First Landing, Hill Prince, Rich Tradition, Sir Gaylord

James Homer "Casey" Hayes (June 16, 1906 – June 25, 1980) was an American Thoroughbred racehorse trainer whose horses won eight national Championship titles of which two were inducted in the National Museum of Racing and Hall of Fame.

A native of Brevard, North Carolina, after working with show hunters and polo ponies, the twenty-six years between 1943 and 1969 is notable for when he trained Thoroughbreds for flat racing for Christopher Chenery.

For Chenery, Casey Hayes conditioned horses that won more than 550 races, including the second leg of the U.S. Triple Crown series in 1950.

1. 1949 American Champion Two-Year-Old Colt - Hill Prince
2. 1950 American Horse of the Year - Hill Prince
3. 1950 American Champion Three-Year-Old Male Horse - Hill Prince
4. 1951 American Champion Older Male Horse - Hill Prince
5. 1958 American Champion Two-Year-Old Colt 1958 - First Landing
6. 1961 American Champion Two-Year-Old Filly - (Cicada)
7. 1962 American Champion Three-Year-Old Filly - Cicada
8. 1963 American Champion Older Female Horse - Cicada

Both Hill Prince and Cicada were National Museum of Racing and Hall of Fame inductees. Among others, Hayes trained Chenery's runners Sir Gaylord, Rich Tradition, Bryan G., and Hydrologist who, on August 2, 1969, ran third in the Monmouth Invitational Handicap which marked the last time Hayes saddled a horse for Chenery.
