= Shut Out (horse) =

American-bred Thoroughbred racehorse

- Sire: Equipoise
- Grandsire: Pennant
- Dam: Goose Egg
- Damsire: Chicle
- Sex: Stallion
- Foaled: February 27, 1939
- Died: April 23, 1964 (aged 25)
- Country: USA
- Colour: Chestnut
- Breeder: Greentree Stable
- Owner: Helen Hay Whitney
- Trainer: John M. Gaver, Sr.
- Record: 40 Starts: 16 – 6 – 4
- Earnings: $317,507

Major wins
- Grand Union Hotel Stakes (1941); Classic Stakes (1942); Yankee Handicap (1942); Blue Grass Stakes (1942); Travers Stakes (1942); Pimlico Special (1943); Wilson Stakes (1943); Laurel Stakes (1943); American Classic Race wins: Kentucky Derby (1942); Belmont Stakes (1942)
- Last updated on November 20, 2008

Shut Out (February 27, 1939 – April 23, 1964) was an American Thoroughbred racehorse.

== Background ==
Shut Out was a chestnut stallion sired by Hall of Famer Equipoise, the multiple stakes-winning champion his fans called "The Chocolate Soldier." Shut Out was bred by Greentree Stable in Lexington, Kentucky, owned by Mrs. Payne Whitney (Helen Hay Whitney), who had also bred his dam, Goose Egg, by the French stallion Chicle.

== Racing career ==
The year Shut Out was born, Greentree Stables also produced top runner Devil Diver, who beat Shut Out in the 1941 Hopeful Stakes for 2-year-olds. Hall of Fame conditioner John Gaver, training for Greentree, gave Eddie Arcaro his choice of Kentucky Derby mounts: Devil Diver or Shut Out. Arcaro chose Devil Diver, who came in sixth. Shut Out, under jockey Wayne D. Wright, won the race. Arcaro switched mounts for the Belmont Stakes, riding Shut Out to victory.

Shut Out's other main rival that year was Alsab, 1941's U.S. Champion Two-Year-Old Colt. Alsab also took 1942's three-year-old honors. Yet Shut Out came close to winning the 1942 Triple Crown, losing the Preakness Stakes to Alsab while finishing fifth after a troubled trip. He also won the prestigious Travers Stakes, again under Arcaro. Shut Out held a 3 to 2 margin over Alsab when Alsab finished fourth in his career finale, while Shut Out was third in an overnight handicap in 1944.

== Stud record ==
Shut Out died in 1964 after a respectable career at stud, siring a number of stakes winners for Greentree such as One Hitter.

== Pedigree ==
Pedigree of Shut Out, chestnut stallion, foaled February 27, 1939
Sire Equipoise chestnut 1928	Pennant ch. 1911	Peter Pan b. 1904	Commando
Sire Equipoise chestnut 1928	Pennant ch. 1911	Peter Pan b. 1904	Cinderella
Sire Equipoise chestnut 1928	Pennant ch. 1911	Royal Rose b. 1894	Royal Hampton
Sire Equipoise chestnut 1928	Pennant ch. 1911	Royal Rose b. 1894	Belle Rose
Sire Equipoise chestnut 1928	Swinging ch. 1922	Broomstick b. 1901	Ben Brush
Sire Equipoise chestnut 1928	Swinging ch. 1922	Broomstick b. 1901	Elf
Sire Equipoise chestnut 1928	Swinging ch. 1922	Balancoire II b. 1911	Meddler
Sire Equipoise chestnut 1928	Swinging ch. 1922	Balancoire II b. 1911	Ballantrae
Dam Goose Egg bay 1927	Chicle b. 1913	Spearmint b. 1903	Carbine
Dam Goose Egg bay 1927	Chicle b. 1913	Spearmint b. 1903	Maid of the Mint
Dam Goose Egg bay 1927	Chicle b. 1913	Lady Hamburg II dkb/br. 1908	Hamburg
Dam Goose Egg bay 1927	Chicle b. 1913	Lady Hamburg II dkb/br. 1908	Lady Frivoles
Dam Goose Egg bay 1927	Oval ch. 1921	Fair Play ch. 1905	Hastings
Dam Goose Egg bay 1927	Oval ch. 1921	Fair Play ch. 1905	Fairy Gold
Dam Goose Egg bay 1927	Oval ch. 1921	Olympia b. 1911	Rock Sand
Dam Goose Egg bay 1927	Oval ch. 1921	Olympia b. 1911	Orienta (Family 16-g)
