= Sam Renick =

Sammy Renick
Personal information
- Born: May 14, 1910 The Bronx, New York
- Died: October 16, 1999 (aged 89) Manhattan, New York
- Occupation: Jockey / sports commentator

Horse racing career
- Sport: Horse racing

Major racing wins
- Paumonok Handicap (1934); Acorn Stakes (1935); Jerome Handicap (1935); Test Stakes (1935); Toboggan Handicap (1935); Westchester Handicap (1935, 1938); Metropolitan Handicap (1936); Queens County Handicap (1936); Shevlin Stakes (1936); Tremont Stakes (1936); Dwyer Stakes (1937); East View Stakes (1938); Questionnaire Handicap (1938, 1939); Great American Stakes (1939); Santa Margarita Handicap (1939)

Significant horses
- Good Gamble, Good Harvest

Samuel William Renick (May 14, 1910 – October 16, 1999) was an American jockey during the 1920s, 1930s, and 1940s. He was a founder of the Jockeys' Guild. After his career ended, Renick became one of television's first racing announcers.

== Early life ==
Renick was born on May 14, 1910, grew up in the Bronx, and was Jewish. At the age of thirteen he ran away from home and went to New Orleans, where he worked in the stables at the Fair Grounds Race Course.

== Racing career ==
Renick began his racing career at the age of sixteen. He eventually became a contract rider for Alfred Gwynne Vanderbilt Jr. and Harry Warner; racing for Vanderbilt on the East Coast and Warner on the West Coast. Renick was one of America's leading jockeys during the 1930s and 1940s and won a number of stakes races.

=== Jockeys' Guild ===
After Renick broke his leg during a race, he and friend and fellow jockey Eddie Arcaro began discussions that led to the creation of Jockeys' Guild, which aimed to gain some protections for jockeys, who did not have insurance or medical protection, and their families, in case of injury or death. During the early years of the Guild, Renick would usually act as master of ceremonies for the organization's fundraising dances, shows, and dinners.

== Broadcasting ==
After Renick's career as a jockey ended, Alfred Gwynne Vanderbilt suggested that he go into broadcasting due to his talkative nature. His first broadcasting job was as Clem McCarthy's color commentator on races from Belmont Park for the NBC television network. In 1952, Renick served as an announcer for the first network television broadcast of the Kentucky Derby. He set the scene for the race, delivered advertising pitches, and performed prerace interviews. In 1954 he called the Preakness Stakes for CBS Television with Fred Capossela and Mel Allen. He also broadcast races from New York and Florida as a color commentator on the "Race of the Week" and "Schaefer Circle of Sports" with Capossela and Win Elliot, "Racing From Aqueduct" with Elliot, and as the host of his own show, "Racing with Renick".

Renick had a small role in the 1958 motion picture, Wind Across the Everglades.

== Death ==
Renick died on October 16, 1999, at his home in Manhattan from complications of a severe stroke that he had suffered the previous winter.
