= One Hitter =

American-bred Thoroughbred racehorse

- Sire: Shut Out
- Grandsire: Equipoise
- Dam: Bold Anna
- Damsire: Bold Venture
- Sex: Stallion
- Foaled: 1946
- Country: United States
- Colour: Bay
- Breeder: Greentree Stud
- Owner: Greentree Stable
- Trainer: John M. Gaver Sr.
- Record: 88: 18-14-16
- Earnings: US$306,775

Major wins
- Manhattan Handicap (1950); Questionnaire Handicap (1950); Pimlico Special (1950); Massachusetts Handicap (1951); Edgemere Handicap (1951); Whitney Stakes (1951); Suburban Handicap (1952); Saratoga Handicap (1952); Monmouth Handicap (1952); Merchants and Citizens Handicap (1953)

One Hitter (foaled 1946 in Kentucky) was an American Thoroughbred racehorse bred and raced by the Greentree Stable of Joan Whitney Payson and her brother, John Hay Whitney.

== Breeding ==
One Hitter was sired by Shut Out, the Greentree bred and owned Kentucky Derby and Preakness Stakes winner of 1942 who in turn was a son of Equipoise. Owned by Whitney family members Harry Payne Whitney and his son Cornelius Vanderbilt Whitney, Equipoise is a U.S. Racing Hall of Fame inductee who was a six-time U. S. Champion including 1932 and 1933 American Horse of the Year as well as the Leading sire in North America in 1942. Shut Out's dam was the stakes winning Goose Egg, another Greentree homebred.

One Hitter's dam was the Greentree homebred Bold Anna, a daughter of the 1936 Kentucky Derby and Preakness Stakes winner, Bold Venture. Bold Anna's dam was the very good racemare Nedana who frequently raced against, and often beat, her male counterparts.

== Racing career ==
One Hitter raced for six years. Racing at age two and three, he was entered in some of the better races for his age group but did not win. From age four through seven he began winning some of the most prestigious handicaps on the East Coast of the United States.

In winning the Questionnaire Handicap, One Hitter set a new Empire City Race Track speed record of 1:42 2/5 for a mile and a sixteenth on dirt.

Retired to stud for his owners, One Hitter produced several stakes winners but no top level runners.

== Pedigree ==
Pedigree of One Hitter
Sire Shut Out	Equipoise	Pennant	Peter Pan
Sire Shut Out	Equipoise	Pennant	Royal Rose
Sire Shut Out	Equipoise	Swinging	Broomstick
Sire Shut Out	Equipoise	Swinging	Balancoire
Sire Shut Out	Goose Egg	Chicle	Spearmint
Sire Shut Out	Goose Egg	Chicle	Lady Hamburg
Sire Shut Out	Goose Egg	Oval	Fair Play
Sire Shut Out	Goose Egg	Oval	Olympia
Dam Bold Anna	Bold Venture	St. Germans	Swynford
Dam Bold Anna	Bold Venture	St. Germans	Hamoaze
Dam Bold Anna	Bold Venture	Possible	Ultimus
Dam Bold Anna	Bold Venture	Possible	Lida Flush
Dam Bold Anna	Nedana	Negofol	Childwick
Dam Bold Anna	Nedana	Negofol	Nebrouze
Dam Bold Anna	Nedana	Adana	Adam
Dam Bold Anna	Nedana	Adana	Mannie Himyar (family: 23-b)
