= Bee Bee Bee =

American-bred Thoroughbred racehorse

- Sire: Better Bee
- Grandsire: Triplicate
- Dam: Paula
- Damsire: Nizami
- Sex: Stallion
- Foaled: 1969
- Country: United States
- Colour: Dark Bay
- Breeder: William S. Miller
- Owner: 1) William S. Miller; 2) William S. Farish III (at age 3)
- Trainer: Del W. Carroll
- Record: 31: 11-8-2
- Earnings: US$281,098

Major wins
- Hawthorne Juvenile Stakes (1971); Survivor Stakes (1972); Patriot Stakes (1972); American Triple Crown wins: Preakness Stakes (1972)

Bee Bee Bee (foaled 1969 in Maryland) was an American Thoroughbred racehorse best known for winning the 1972 Preakness Stakes. To date Bee Bee Bee is one of only eight Maryland-bred colts to win the Preakness, and one of only eleven from the state to win a triple crown race.

== Background ==
Bee Bee Bee was sired by multiple stakes winner Better Bee, who was a grandson of U.S. Racing Hall of Fame inductee Reigh Count. His dam was Paula, a granddaughter of the great Nearco. Bee Bee Bee was bred by former Illinois racing commissioner William S. Miller of Chicago who dispersed his racing stable following a bribery scandal involving Chicago mayor, Richard J. Daley. As a result, during the 1971-72 winter Bee Bee Bee became the property of William S. Farish III who late in the decade became the owner of Lane's End Farm near Versailles, Kentucky.

== Racing career ==
In the fall of 1971, two-year-old Bee Bee Bee was competing at Timonium Racetrack, a 1/2-mile (0.80 km) track far from the limelight that shone on the best-bred stars at top tracks along the Eastern seaboard. After winter racing in Florida, the colt was brought back to Maryland by his new owner where he won two minor races at Pimlico Race Course in Baltimore

Although nominated for the U.S. Triple Crown series, trainer Del Carroll chose not to run Bee Bee Bee in the Kentucky Derby. However, an impressive seven-length win in the April 29, 1972 Survivor Stakes at 1 1/8 miles (1.8 km) on the Pimlico track convinced him to enter the colt in the May 20 Preakness Stakes.

Bee Bee Bee was confronting Kentucky Derby winner Riva Ridge and standouts Key to the Mint and No Le Hace. On the day preceding the Preakness, Pimlico Race Course was hit by heavy rains. At race time, the track was listed as sloppy. Riva Ridge, who had not previously run on a sloppy track, remained the heavy favorite. Sent off at odds of 19:1, jockey Eldon Nelson sent Bee Bee Bee into an early lead and the duo never looked back. Relishing the muddy conditions, the colt held off a late rally by No Le Hace to earn the most important victory of his career. Riva Ridge proved not to perform well and finished fourth. Bee Bee Bee did not run in the 1 1/2-mile (2.4 km) Belmont Stakes, but his Preakness win turned out to be the one that denied the Triple Crown to Riva Ridge, who won the Belmont Stakes.

In late June 1972, Bee Bee Bee made his first start since the Preakness, winning the Patriot Stakes by five lengths at Liberty Bell Park Racetrack in Philadelphia.

== Stud record ==
Retired to stud, in 1974 Bee Bee Bee was sent to a breeding farm in Japan. As of 1992 he had fathered 404 foals, of which 223 were winners and eight were graded-stake winners.

== Pedigree ==
Pedigree of Bee Bee Bee
Sire Better Bee drk.brn. 1954	Triplicate ch. 1941	Reigh Count	Sunreigh
Sire Better Bee drk.brn. 1954	Triplicate ch. 1941	Reigh Count	Contessina
Sire Better Bee drk.brn. 1954	Triplicate ch. 1941	Fairday	Fair Play
Sire Better Bee drk.brn. 1954	Triplicate ch. 1941	Fairday	Ruthenia
Sire Better Bee drk.brn. 1954	S. Bee black 1943	Haste	Maintenant
Sire Better Bee drk.brn. 1954	S. Bee black 1943	Haste	Miss Malaprop
Sire Better Bee drk.brn. 1954	S. Bee black 1943	Sevres	The Scout
Sire Better Bee drk.brn. 1954	S. Bee black 1943	Sevres	Anna M. Humphrey
Dam Paula brown 1953	Nizami bay 1946	Nearco	Pharos
Dam Paula brown 1953	Nizami bay 1946	Nearco	Nogara
Dam Paula brown 1953	Nizami bay 1946	Mumtaz Begum	Blenheim
Dam Paula brown 1953	Nizami bay 1946	Mumtaz Begum	Mumtaz Mahal
Dam Paula brown 1953	Withdrawn bay 1948	Haltal	The Porter
Dam Paula brown 1953	Withdrawn bay 1948	Haltal	False Modesty
Dam Paula brown 1953	Withdrawn bay 1948	Golden Rose	Sickle
Dam Paula brown 1953	Withdrawn bay 1948	Golden Rose	Nipisiquit
