= 1933 Kentucky Derby =

Horse race

59th Kentucky Derby
- Kentucky Derby
- Grade I stakes race
- Location: Churchill Downs
- Date: May 6, 1933
- Winning horse: Brokers Tip
- Jockey: Don Meade
- Trainer: Henry J. Thompson
- Owner: Edward R. Bradley
- Surface: Dirt

The 1933 Kentucky Derby was the 59th running of the Kentucky Derby. The race took place on May 6, 1933.

The first two finishers of the race were Brokers Tip, ridden by Don Meade, and Head Play, ridden by Herb Fisher. Head Play led early, but Brokers Tip went through an opening on the inside to pull even. As the horses ran side-by-side down the stretch, their jockeys grabbed and whipped each other, and the race became known as the "fighting finish." The racing stewards declared Brokers Tip the winner by a nose. It was the only victory of his career.

Meade and Fisher later fought in the jockey's room; both were suspended for 30 days for their actions during the race. Fisher claimed that Head Play had won and that Brokers Tip should have been disqualified. Meade, when interviewed 50 years later, said, "I couldn't push him away from me because he had ahold of me, so I had to get ahold of him. So from there down to the wire, that's what it was - grab and grab and grab."

== Full results ==
Finished	Post	Horse	Jockey	Trainer	Owner	Time / behind
1st	16	Brokers Tip	Don Meade	Herbert J. Thompson	Edward R. Bradley	2:06.80
2nd	9	Head Play	Herb Fisher	Willie Crump	Suzanne Mason	
3rd		Charley O.	Charles Corbett	J. Thomas Taylor	R. M. Eastman Estate	
4th		Ladysman	Raymond Workman	Joseph H. Stotler	William Robertson Coe	
5th		Pomponius	John Bejshak	Joseph H. Stotler	William Robertson Coe	
6th		Spicson	Reggie Fischer	John S. Skirvin	L. M. Severson	
7th		Kerry Patch	Louis Schaefer	Joe Notter	Lee Rosenberg	
8th		Mr. Khayyam	Pete Walls	Matthew Peter Brady	Catawba Stable	
9th		Inlander	Dominick Bellizzi	J. J. Connor	Brookmeade Stable	
10th		Strideaway	Albert Beck	Richard N. Vestal	Three D's Stock Farm	
11th		Dark Winter	Robert Jones	Bennett W. Creech	Willis Sharpe Kilmer	
12th		Isaiah	Clarence McCrossen	John Milton Goode	James W. Parrish	
13th		Good Advice	Eddie Legere	Matthew Peter Brady	Catawba Stable	
