= James C. Bentley =

Canadian racehorse trainer (1903–1984)

Personal information
- Born: 1903 Ballyglass, County Limerick, Ireland
- Died: July 7, 1984 (aged 80–81) Toronto, Ontario, Canada
- Occupation: Trainer

Horse racing career
- Sport: Horse racing

Major racing wins
- Grey Stakes (1948, 1950, 1952, 1970); Victoria Stakes (1948, 1954, 1972); Canadian International Stakes (1949); Travers Stakes (1949); American Legion Handicap (1950); Excelsior Handicap (1950); Fall Highweight Handicap (1950); King Edward Stakes (1950); Sysonby Handicap (1950); Carter Handicap (1951); Philip H. Iselin Stakes (1951); Questionnaire Handicap (1951); Princess Elizabeth Stakes (1953, 1958); Simcoe Stakes (1953); Clarendon Stakes (1954, 1979); My Dear Stakes (1954); Achievement Stakes (1955); Maple Leaf Stakes (1955, 1972); Niagara Handicap (1955); Highlander Stakes (1956); Stymie Stakes (1957); Colin Stakes (1970); Cup and Saucer Stakes (1970); Alabama Stakes (1971); Bison City Stakes (1971); Delaware Oaks (1971); Plate Trial Stakes (1971); Woodbine Oaks (1971); Dominion Day Stakes (1972); Jockey Club Cup Handicap (1972); Coronation Futurity Stakes (1973); Toronto Cup Stakes (1976); Vandal Stakes (1976); Ohio Derby (1980); Sheridan Handicap (1980); Fanfreluche Stakes (1981); Connaught Cup Stakes (1983); Nassau Stakes (1983) (2 divs.); Shepperton Stakes (1983); Lady Angela Stakes (1984) Canadian Triple Crown series: Queen's Plate (1971, 1981)

Honours
- Canadian Horse Racing Hall of Fame (1981)

Significant horses
- Arise, Fiddle Dancer Boy, Kennedy Road, Lauries Dancer, Military Bearing, Snow Knight, Stone Manor

James Charles Bentley (1903 – July 7, 1984) was a Canadian Horse Racing Hall of Fame trainer of Thoroughbred racehorses who twice won Canada's most prestigious race, the Queen's Plate. During his career he trained horses to win six National Championships, three of which would earn Hall of Fame induction.

== Background ==
Born in Ireland, Jim Bentley exercised and rode horses in both steeplechase and Flat racing for a stable run by his father. In the early 1920s he emigrated to the United States where he found work for Edward R. Bradley's Idle Hour Stock Farm in Lexington, Kentucky. While at New York state's Saratoga Race Course in 1927 he met Canadian trainer John Dixon who encouraged him to come work for him in Canada. Bentley accepted and became part of Ontario racing until he saddled his last horse on April 23, 1984, at Greenwood Raceway. During that long career, Jim Bentley trained for a number of prominent owners including E. P. Taylor and his son Charles, as well as Arthur Stollery and his wife Helen.

== Top horses ==
Jim Bentley runners Arise, Kennedy Road, and Lauries Dancer would each be inducted into the Canadian Horse Racing Hall of Fame. Bentley race conditioned Kennedy Road to three National Championships. The filly Lauries Dancer was voted the 1971 Canadian Champion Three-Year-Old Filly and Canadian Horse of the Year. In the pre Sovereign Award era, the Windfields Farm colt Lord Durham was named the 1973 Canadian Champion Two-Year-Old Colt. With some of his most successful runners, Jim Bentley won top stakes races in Canada as well as in the United States.

With Kennedy Road, Bentley won his first Queen's Plate in 1971 and Fiddle Dancer Boy gave him a second win in 1981.

On July 7, 1984, Jim Bentley died at age 81 in Wellesley Hospital in Toronto.
