= Donor (horse) =

American-bred Thoroughbred racehorse

- Sire: Challedon
- Grandsire: Challenger II
- Dam: Orissa
- Damsire: Purchase
- Sex: Gelding
- Foaled: 1944
- Country: United States
- Colour: Bay
- Breeder: W. Deering Howe
- Owner: W. Deering Howe
- Trainer: George P. "Maje" Odom
- Record: 71: 20-11-6
- Earnings: $367,560

Major wins
- Sapling Stakes (1946); World's Playground Stakes (1946); Sanford Stakes (1946); Champagne Stakes (1946); Yankee Handicap (1947); Jerome Handicap (1947); Questionnaire Handicap (1948); Narragansett Special (1948, 1949); Butler Handicap (1948); Saratoga Handicap (1949); Manhattan Handicap (1949); New York Handicap (1949)

Donor (foaled 1944) was an American Thoroughbred racehorse sired by the champion Challedon. He was bred and owned by W. Deering Howe, the great-grandson of William Deering, founder of the Deering Harvester Company.

Racing at age two, Donor won seven of his twelve races. He won prestigious races such as the Sapling Stakes at Monmouth Park, the Sanford Stakes at Saratoga Race Course, and the Champagne Stakes at Belmont Park to be considered a top 2 year old. He ran third to the 2 yr old champion Double Jay in the James H. Connors at Narragansett Park.

He returned to racing late in the spring at age three and won the Yankee Handicap at Suffolk Downs. The Daily Racing Form reported: "Deering Howe's Donor, one of the leaders in the juvenile division last season, propelled himself into a contending position for sophomore honors when he turned in a sparkling effort to account for the $25,000 Yankee Handicap here this afternoon before a colorful and enthusiastic gathering of 33,196." He also added the Jerome Handicap as a sophomore runner.

As an older horse, he won the Saratoga Handicap, the New York Handicap, and the Manhattan Handicap, and became the first (and only) two-time winner of the Narragansett Special. 70 days after the first Narragansett Special win, W. Deering Howe died at Varadero Beach, Cuba. His second wife continued to campaign Donor until 1952.

In his second Narragansett Special victory, he defeated Calumet Farm's Kentucky Derby winner Ponder and Santa Anita Handicap winner Vulcan's Forge in a three-way photo. An eye-witness account read

Donor hit the home stretch with a clear lead, but Vulcan's Forge was closing the gap. A 3 length lead was down to two with three sixteenths of a mile to race. With 200 yds left the lead was just one and Ponder was roaring down the middle of the track like a freight train. Now 100 yds to go and Vulcan's Forge came up to the neck of Donor who digs in and refuses to yield. All the while Ponder continues to gain with each jump. Three horses across the track reaching for the wire as the roar of the crowd rises to the heights.

I cried, "He didn't get there", as the top three finished virtually together. Donor had kept his head in front and Vulcan's Forge was a neck beyond the Kentucky Derby winner.

I knew Ponder was third as the great thoroughbreds continued past our spot. Yet, I wasn't disappointed. It was a great race...
