= Rich Tradition =

American-bred Thoroughbred racehorse

- Sire: Rosemont
- Grandsire: The Porter
- Dam: Legendra
- Damsire: Challenger
- Sex: Mare
- Foaled: 1956
- Country: United States
- Colour: Bay
- Breeder: Newstead Farm
- Owner: Christopher Chenery
- Trainer: Casey Hayes
- Record: 32: 5-5-4
- Earnings: US$122,749

Major wins
- Schuylerville Stakes (1958); Selima Stakes (1958); Spinaway Stakes (1958)

Rich Tradition (foaled March 13, 1956 in Virginia) was an American Thoroughbred racemare bred by Taylor Hardin's Newstead Farm and raced by Christopher Chenery.

A daughter of Rosemont, Rich Tradition was out of the Challenger mare, Legendra. Trained by Casey Hayes, Rich Tradition was a major competitor in the two-year-old filly ranks in 1958, winning the important Schuylerville, Spinaway and Selima
