= John Ruane =

American jockey

Personal information
- Born: October 4, 1936 County Mayo, Ireland
- Died: September 3, 2006 (aged 69) Somers Point, New Jersey, United States
- Occupation: Jockey

Horse racing career
- Sport: Horse racing
- Career wins: 1,800+

Major racing wins
- John Morris Handicap (1957, 1958, 1964); Long Island Handicap (1957); Firenze Handicap (1957, 1958, 1964); Hialeah Turf Cup Handicap (1958); Test Stakes (1958, 1966); Brooklyn Handicap (1958); Myles Standish Handicap (1958); Prioress Stakes (1958); Whitney Handicap (1958); Remsen Stakes (1958); Sysonby Handicap (1958); Sanford Stakes (1959); Man O' War Stakes (1960); Niagara Handicap (1961); Stymie Handicap (1961); Ladies Handicap (1964); Bed O' Roses Handicap (1965); Delaware Handicap (1965); Diana Handicap (1965); Jersey Belle Stakes (1965); Demoiselle Stakes (1969); Haskell Invitational Stakes (1970); Toboggan Handicap (1970); Knickerbocker Handicap (1971, 1980); Metropolitan Handicap (1971); Suburban Handicap (1971); Vosburgh Stakes (1971); Comely Stakes (1972, 1976); Minuteman Handicap (1972); Paumonok Handicap (1972); John B. Campbell Handicap (1973); Tom Fool Stakes (1975); Massachusetts Handicap (1979); Poinciana Handicap (1976); Bryn Mawr Stakes (1981); Longfellow Handicap (1981); Kelly-Olympic Stakes (1983); Whitemarsh Handicap (1983); New Hope Stakes (1984); Riggs Handicap (1984); Rushing Man Stakes (1986)

Significant horses
- Cohoes, Tunex, Duck Dance, Steeple Jill, Twice Worthy
- Updated on February 27, 2007

John Vincent Ruane (October 4, 1936 – September 3, 2006) was an American jockey in Thoroughbred horse racing.

Ruane began his career in 1957, competing on the New York State racing circuit where he rode for noted U.S. Racing Hall of Fame horse trainers such as John M. Gaver, Sr. and H. Allen Jerkens. He retired after forty-two years having ridden winners of a number of important Graded stakes races.

A native of County Mayo, Ireland, in 1958 John Ruane received recognition for his racing success in America at a ceremony in Belmont Park where Irish government representatives presented him with a piece of Waterford Crystal marked with the official Connaught Crest.

John Ruane was living in Ocean City, New Jersey at the time of his death from pulmonary complications in 2006.
