= Bryan G. =

American-bred Thoroughbred racehorse

- Sire: Blenheim
- Grandsire: Blandford
- Dam: Anthemion
- Damsire: Pompey
- Sex: Stallion
- Foaled: 1947
- Country: United States
- Colour: Chestnut
- Breeder: Christopher Chenery
- Owner: Christopher Chenery
- Trainer: Casey Hayes
- Record: 62: 14-18-4
- Earnings: US$165,625

Major wins
- Pimlico Special (1951); Questionnaire Handicap (1951); Westchester Handicap (1951); Aqueduct Handicap (1951, 1952)

Bryan G. (foaled 1947 in Virginia) was a successful American Thoroughbred racehorse and sire of the great Hall of Fame Champion racemare, Cicada.

Bryan G. was bred by Christopher Chenery at his Meadow Stud in Doswell, Virginia. Raced by Chenery, he was trained by Casey Hayes. Among his most important race wins, Bryan G. won the 1951 Pimlico Special, at the time a prestigious winner-take-all event that became the first ever race to be televised nationally.

Sire of champions Cicada and Sayil who was horse of the year in Mexico.

== Pedigree ==
Pedigree of Bryan G.
Sire Blenheim	Blandford	Swynford	John O'Gaunt
Sire Blenheim	Blandford	Swynford	Canterbury Pilgrim
Sire Blenheim	Blandford	Blanche	White Eagle
Sire Blenheim	Blandford	Blanche	Black Cherry
Sire Blenheim	Malva	Charles O'Malley	Desmond
Sire Blenheim	Malva	Charles O'Malley	Goody Two-Shoes
Sire Blenheim	Malva	Wild Arum	Robert le Diable
Sire Blenheim	Malva	Wild Arum	Marliacea
Dam Anthemion	Pompey	Sun Briar	Sundridge
Dam Anthemion	Pompey	Sun Briar	Sweet Briar
Dam Anthemion	Pompey	Cleopatra	Corcyra
Dam Anthemion	Pompey	Cleopatra	Gallice
Dam Anthemion	Sicklefeather	Sickle	Phalaris
Dam Anthemion	Sicklefeather	Sickle	Selene
Dam Anthemion	Sicklefeather	Fairness	Hourless
Dam Anthemion	Sicklefeather	Fairness	Fair Priscilla
