= Tom Fool =

American Thoroughbred racehorse

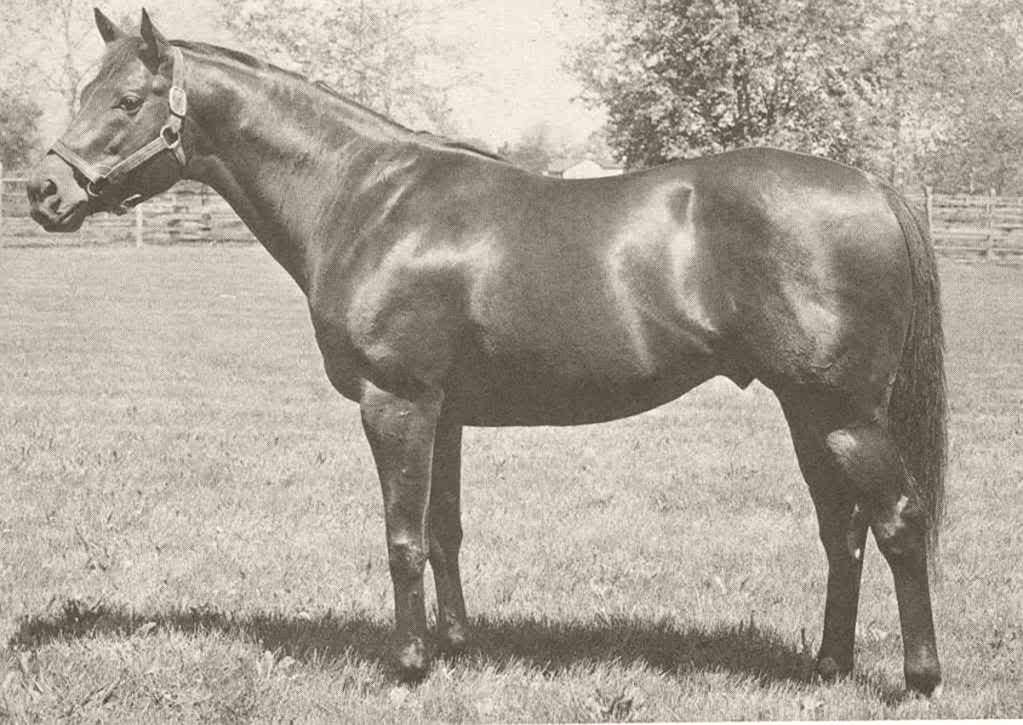
- Sire: Menow
- Grandsire: Pharamond II
- Dam: Gaga
- Damsire: Bull Dog
- Sex: Stallion
- Foaled: March 31, 1949
- Country: United States
- Colour: Bay
- Breeder: Duval A. Headley
- Owner: Greentree Stables; Racing colors: Pink, black stripes on sleeves, black cap.
- Trainer: John M. Gaver, Sr.
- Record: 30: 21–7–1
- Earnings: $570,165

Major wins
- Sanford Stakes (1951); Belmont Futurity Stakes (1951); Grand Union Hotel Stakes (1951); East View Stakes (1951); Jerome Handicap (1952); Grey Lag Handicap (1952); Empire City Handicap (1952); Sysonby Handicap (1952, 1953); Wilson Stakes (1952, 1953); Metropolitan Handicap (1953); Suburban Handicap (1953); Brooklyn Handicap (1953); Whitney Handicap (1953); Carter Handicap (1953); Pimlico Special (1953)

Awards
- U.S. Champion 2-Yr-Old Colt (1951); 2nd New York Handicap Triple (1953); U.S. Champion Older Horse (1953); U.S. Champion Sprint Horse (1953); United States Horse of the Year (1953); Leading broodmare sire in Britain & Ireland (1965)

Honours
- United States Racing Hall of Fame inductee (1960); Aiken Thoroughbred Racing Hall of Fame (1977) #11 – Top 100 U.S. Racehorses of the 20th Century; Tom Fool Handicap at Belmont Park
- Last updated on 25 November 2023

Tom Fool (March 31, 1949 – August 20, 1976) was a champion American Thoroughbred racehorse who was the 1953 American Horse of the Year and was inducted into the Racing Hall of Fame. He sired the champion racehorses Buckpasser and Tim Tam.

== Background ==
Owned by Greentree Stables, Tom Fool was bred by Duval Headley, a Thoroughbred trainer and nephew of prominent Kentucky breeder Hal Price Headley. Tom Fool was a bay colt by the racehorse and sire Menow out of Gaga by Pharamond II. He was a half-brother to the good two-year-old Aunt Jinny, and was a great-grandson of the broodmare Laughing Queen, whose other descendants included the Kentucky Derby winner Dust Commander. Greentree Stables purchased Tom Fool privately as a yearling for $20,000.

== Racing record ==
Tom Fool was trained by John M. Gaver, Sr. and ridden by Ted Atkinson. In his two-year-old season, he had five wins and two seconds in seven starts, which earned him Champion 2-Year-Old Colt honors for 1951.

After he finished second in the Wood Memorial Stakes at age 3, the horse's veterinarian discovered he had raced with a high fever. The illness sidelined Tom Fool for more than two months, and he missed the Triple Crown races. Although his 1952 season was difficult, he won six of his thirteen starts. Along with Tom Fool's many accomplishments, he sired notable champions including Tim Tam and Stop the Music, who was also inducted into the hall of fame.

In 1953, a healthy four-year-old Tom Fool was undefeated in ten races, He won at distances ranging from 5½ furlongs to 1¼ miles and became only the second horse to win New York's Handicap Triple Crown: the Metropolitan, Suburban and Brooklyn Handicaps. Tom Fool also won the Whitney Stakes and captured the Pimlico Special by eight lengths. This final start was a win that concluded a perfect four-year-old campaign with 10 stakes wins in as many starts. The Pimlico Special was his fourth consecutive race start in a non-betting race; by this time, few horses were entered against him. In polls to determine Horse of the Year honors, Tom Fool topped polls by the Thoroughbred Racing Association (34 of a possible 37 votes) and Triangle Publications (30 of 31).

Tom Fool retired with a record of 30 starts for 21 wins, 7 seconds and 1 third for earnings of $570,165.

== Stud career ==
Tom Fool was syndicated for $1,750,000, as a stallion and initially stood for a $5,000 service fee. He sired the winners of over 650 races in America and England, with over 30 stakes winners, including:

- Buckpasser – 1966 U.S. Horse of the Year, U.S. Racing Hall of Fame inductee
- Silly Season (USA), England's leading two-year-old of 1964 and sire of Lunchtime, a good sire in Australia.
- Tim Tam – won Kentucky Derby, Preakness Stakes, U.S. Racing Hall of Fame inductee
- Tompion – multiple stakes winner, including Grade 1 Santa Anita Derby, Blue Grass Stakes and Travers Stakes in 1960

Tom Fool's bloodline endures in the 2015 U.S. Triple Crown winner, American Pharoah, who is both a sixth- and seventh-generation descendant.

== Honors ==
Tom Fool was inducted into the National Museum of Racing and Hall of Fame in 1960. In The Blood-Horse magazine ranking of the Blood-Horse magazine Top 100 Racehorses of the 20th Century, he was ranked #11. The Tom Fool Handicap, contested at Belmont Park, is named in his honor.

Tom Fool retired from stud duties in 1972 and died on 20 August 1976.

== See also ==
- List of leading Thoroughbred racehorses

== Pedigree ==
Pedigree of Tom Fool
Sire Menow Bay 1935	Pharamond II (GB); Bay 1925	Phalaris	Polymelus
Sire Menow Bay 1935	Pharamond II (GB); Bay 1925	Phalaris	Bromus
Sire Menow Bay 1935	Pharamond II (GB); Bay 1925	Selene	Chaucer
Sire Menow Bay 1935	Pharamond II (GB); Bay 1925	Selene	Serenissima
Sire Menow Bay 1935	Alcibiades; Chestnut 1927	Supremus	Ultimus
Sire Menow Bay 1935	Alcibiades; Chestnut 1927	Supremus	Mandy Hamilton
Sire Menow Bay 1935	Alcibiades; Chestnut 1927	Regal Roman (GB)	Roi Herode
Sire Menow Bay 1935	Alcibiades; Chestnut 1927	Regal Roman (GB)	Lady Cicero
Dam Gaga Bay 1942	Bull Dog (FR); Bay 1927	Teddy	Ajax (FR)
Dam Gaga Bay 1942	Bull Dog (FR); Bay 1927	Teddy	Rondeau
Dam Gaga Bay 1942	Bull Dog (FR); Bay 1927	Plucky Liege (GB)	Spearmint
Dam Gaga Bay 1942	Bull Dog (FR); Bay 1927	Plucky Liege (GB)	Concertina
Dam Gaga Bay 1942	Alpoise; Bay 1937	Equipoise	Pennant
Dam Gaga Bay 1942	Alpoise; Bay 1937	Equipoise	Swinging
Dam Gaga Bay 1942	Alpoise; Bay 1937	Laughing Queen	Sun Briar
Dam Gaga Bay 1942	Alpoise; Bay 1937	Laughing Queen	Cleopatra (Family: 3-j)
