= Warren Mehrtens =

American jockey

Personal information
- Born: November 5, 1920 Brooklyn, New York, U.S.
- Died: December 30, 1997 (aged 77) Sarasota, Florida, U.S.
- Resting place: Flushing Cemetery, Flushing, New York
- Occupation: Jockey

Horse racing career
- Sport: Horse racing
- Career wins: 614

Major racing wins
- Butler Memorial Handicap (1942); Gallant Fox Handicap (1942); Havre de Grace Handicap (1942); Washington Park Handicap (1943); Questionnaire Handicap (1943); Juvenile Stakes (1944); Narragansett Special (1944, 1949); National Stallion Stakes (1944); Saratoga Handicap (1944, 1949); New York Handicap (1945, 1949); Dwyer Stakes (1946); Modesty Stakes (1946); Wood Memorial Stakes (1946); Acorn Stakes (1947, 1951); Arlington Matron Stakes (1947); Black-Eyed Susan Stakes (1947, 1948); Westchester Handicap (1947); Arlington Classic (1947); Walden Stakes (1947); Arlington-Washington Lassie Stakes (1948); Sanford Stakes (1948); Suburban Handicap (1948); Manhattan Handicap (1949); Palm Beach Handicap (1950); Acorn Stakes (1951); American Legion Handicap (1951); Spinaway Stakes (1951) American Classic Race wins: Kentucky Derby (1946); Preakness Stakes (1946); Belmont Stakes (1946)

Significant horses
- Assault, But Why Not, Bridal Flower

Warren Mehrtens (November 5, 1920 – December 30, 1997) was an American Thoroughbred horse racing jockey best known for winning the U.S. Triple Crown in 1946.

Born in Brooklyn, New York, Warren Mehrtens graduated from Jamaica High School in 1938. Growing up near Aqueduct Racetrack he was a fan of Thoroughbred racing and after finishing school pursued a career as a professional jockey. Under the guidance of future U.S. Racing Hall of Fame trainer Max Hirsch, he won his first race in 1940 and soon began winning important races at Chicago and New York City area racetracks.

In 1946, twenty-six-year-old Warren Mehrtens rode Assault to victory in the Wood Memorial Stakes, then swept all three of the American Classic Races to become only the seventh jockey in history to win the U.S. Triple Crown Champion.

Mehrtens retired from racing in 1952 and went to work as a race steward at Keeneland Race Course in Lexington, Kentucky and later at Delaware Park Racetrack in Stanton, Delaware before joining the New York Racing Association in 1973.

Warren Mehrtens died in Sarasota, Florida in 1997 at age seventy-seven.
