= Homer C. Pardue =

American horse trainer

Homer Pardue
Personal information
- Born: March 5, 1910 Louisville, Kentucky
- Died: January 5, 1979 (aged 68)
- Occupation: Trainer / Owner

Horse racing career
- Sport: Horse racing

Major racing wins
- Modesty Handicap (1943); Senator Purse (1948); Flash Stakes (1955); Carter Handicap (1956,1977); Discovery Handicap (1956); Jerome Handicap (1956, 1977); Manhattan Handicap (1957); Saratoga Handicap (1957); American Legion Handicap (1958); Camden Handicap (1965); Excelsior Handicap (1965); Red Smith Handicap (1965); Saranac Stakes (1965); Arkansas Derby (1972, 1977); Sanford Stakes (1973); Saratoga Special Stakes (1973); Belmont Futurity Stakes (1975); Lecomte Stakes (1977); Louisiana Derby (1972, 1977); Louisiana Handicap (1977); Oaklawn Handicap (1977); Boojum Handicap (1977)

Honors
- Fair Grounds Racing Hall of Fame (2000)

Significant horses
- Clev Er Tell, No Le Hace, Soy Numero Uno, Broadway Forli

Homer Chesley Pardue (March 5, 1910 – January 5, 1979) was an American trainer and owner of Thoroughbred racehorses.

Born in Louisville, Kentucky, across the street from Churchill Downs, Pardue began working in the racing industry as an exercise rider at the famous track while a fourteen-year-old schoolboy. Twenty years later he had his first Kentucky Derby runner when Red Hannigan finished twelfth in the 1954 running. In the 1940s, under his wife Katy's name, he owned and raced several horses such as Rodger Joe and Doubt Not. 1972 saw Pardue return to the Triple Crown series with his Louisiana and Arkansas Derby winner, No Le Hace. The colt finished second in both the Derby and the Preakness Stakes and then sixth in the Belmont Stakes.

Among Pardue's other important wins, in 1975 he trained two-year-old Soy Numero Uno to a win in the then-most important U.S. race for juveniles, the Futurity Stakes at Belmont Park. With Clev Er Tell, in 1977 Pardue again won the Louisiana and Arkansas Derbys in the same year but did not make it to the Triple Crown events when the horse suffered a fractured knee during training.

On January 5, 1979, Pardue died at age 68 at his home in Louisville, Kentucky. In 2000, he was posthumously inducted into the Fair Grounds Racing Hall of Fame.
