= No Le Hace =

American-bred Thoroughbred racehorse

- Sire: Candy Spots
- Grandsire: Nigromante
- Dam: Tasma
- Damsire: Crafty Admiral
- Sex: Stallion
- Foaled: 1969
- Country: United States
- Colour: Chestnut
- Breeder: Nuckols Brothers
- Owner: Joseph R. Straus Sr.
- Trainer: Homer C. Pardue
- Record: 34: 9-8-4
- Earnings: $239,752

Major wins
- Lecomte Stakes (1972); Louisiana Derby (1972); Arkansas Derby (1972); Sugar Bowl Handicap (1971)

Honors
- Fair Grounds Racing Hall of Fame (1993)
- Last updated on October 30, 2021

No Le Hace was an American Thoroughbred racehorse foaled on March 18, 1969, No Le Hace is best remembered for his runner-up performances in the $200,000 grade 1 Preakness Stakes to Bee Bee Bee and the Kentucky Derby behind Riva Ridge.

== Background ==
No Le Hace was a chestnut horse bred by Nuckols Brothers. He was sired by Candy Spots and was a grandson of Nigromante. He was out of the mare Tasma. He was trained by Homer C. Pardue. After retiring No Le Hace was sold and sent to Japan for stud duty.

== Racing career ==
=== 1971: two-year-old season ===
At age two No Le Hace won four of his first five races including his maiden and two allowance races. In December 1972, his connections ran him in his first stakes race at six furlongs on the dirt in the Sugar Bowl Handicap at Fair Grounds Race Course. He won that race going away by four lengths.

=== 1972: three-year-old season ===
In the lead-up to the 1972 U.S. Triple Crown series, No Le Hace won the Lecomte Stakes at Fair Grounds Race Course in New Orleans, Louisiana. He then won the mile and one sixteenth Louisiana Derby at the Fair Grounds Race Course in late March. In April, he was sent to Oaklawn Park in Hot Springs, Arkansas, where he won the Arkansas Derby.

Ridden by jockey Phil Rubbicco in his prep races, No Le Hace was listed as the third favorite on the morning line of the Kentucky Derby at 9–2. He finished second to 3-2 favorite Riva Ridge. Two weeks later on Saturday, May 20, 1972, No Le Hace was entered in the $200,000 Preakness Stakes run at a mile and three sixteenths on dirt at Pimlico Race Course in Baltimore, Maryland. On the morning line, he was the third favorite at 6–1 in a field of seven. Derby winner Riva Ridge was the prohibitive odds-on favorite as 1–3. No Le Hace broke very poorly in last. Under Rubbicco, he was aggressively rated back going into Pimlico's famous "Clubhouse Turn." No Le Hace was taken to the outside by Rubbicco and moved into sixth going down the backstretch. Fractions were blistering on the front end, with the first quarter in :231/5 and the half in :47 seconds flat. A 19-1 longshot, Bee Bee Bee, led, followed by Key To The Mint one length back.

At three quarters of a mile, No Le Hace was six lengths back, and at the mile he was four lengths back as the leader tipped the clock at 1:362/5. No Le Hace closed steadily to finish second to Bee Bee Bee by a length and a half. He took home 20% of the purse, $30,000, in the 97th running of the Preakness.
