= Del W. Carroll =

American horse trainer and polo player

Del Carroll
Personal information
- Born: October 30, 1919 Chester, Pennsylvania, U.S.
- Died: May 9, 1982 (aged 62) Lexington, Kentucky, U.S.
- Occupation: Trainer

Horse racing career
- Sport: Horse racing
- Career wins: 2,115

Major racing wins
- Hanshin Cup Handicap (1959); Royal Poinciana Handicap (1961); Blue Grass Stakes (1966); Breeders' Futurity Stakes (1966, 1978); Ben Ali Handicap (1967); Juvenile Stakes (1967); Youthful Stakes (1967, 1978); Clark Handicap (1968, 1969); Palm Beach Handicap (1968); Phoenix Handicap (1969); Ashland Stakes (1970); Fashion Stakes (1970); Acorn Stakes (1971); Mother Goose Stakes (1971); Fayette Handicap (1973); Jersey Derby (1974); Astoria Stakes (1979); East View Stakes (1979); Southwest Stakes (1979); Adirondack Stakes (1980); Alcibiades Stakes (1980); Gravesend Handicap (1980, 1981); Razorback Handicap (1980); Schuylerville Stakes (1980, 1981) American Classic Race wins: Preakness Stakes (1972)

Racing awards
- Leading trainer at Oaklawn Park (1979); Leading trainer at Keeneland (Spring & Fall 1981, Spring 1982)

Honours
- Museum of Polo and Hall of Fame (2003)

Significant horses
- Abe's Hope, April Skies, Bee Bee Bee, Deceit, Raja Baba

Delmer W. Carroll (October 30, 1919 – May 9, 1982) was an American champion polo player, Thoroughbred racehorse owner/trainer, and soldier during World War II.

== Biography ==
Delmer W. Carroll was born in Chester, Pennsylvania. He began riding and jumping horses before he was ten years old. He was educated at the Lawrenceville School in New Jersey where he was a member of a championship winning polo team.

Carroll served in the US Army cavalry during World War II. He rose to the rank of first lieutenant. According to a 1945 Pennsylvania Military College article, he "was a member of the mechanized cavalry group that did the dangerous advance scouting during the German campaign."

Carroll's knowledge of horses led to his participation in the game of polo. One of the top twenty-five players in the world during the 1950s and 1960s, he became an eight-goal handicap player. He remained active in the game throughout his life and at the time of his death at age sixty-two still had a four-goal handicap. His interest in horses also led to a career as a professional horse trainer, conditioning Thoroughbreds for friends and fellow polo players, William S. Farish III and Michael Grace Phipps.

=== 1972 Preakness Stakes ===
Del Carroll had four horses run in the Kentucky Derby with his best result a fifth in 1966 with Blue Grass Stakes winner, Abe's Hope. He had had a sixth-place finish in the 1969 Preakness Stakes but on May 29, 1972, he earned the most important win of his career. In that year's Preakness Stakes, run on a sloppy Pimlico Race Course, Carroll's colt Bee Bee Bee took victory in the prestigious U.S. Triple Crown race.

During his career, Del Carroll won three training titles at Keeneland Race Course, one at Oaklawn Park Race Track, and was one of the top trainers at Arlington Park in Chicago where he won 262 races.

Alone in the early morning of May 5, 1982, Del Carroll was galloping one of his horses on the Keeneland track when he was thrown by the horse and suffered severe head injuries. He underwent surgery at St. Joseph's Hospital in Lexington but died four days later.

== Legacy ==
His son, Del Carroll II, who was his assistant from 1970 through 1979, is now a trainer at tracks on the US East Coast.

His daughter, Robin Ann Carroll, who grew up with her father on the race track, is now the owner of Magazin Farms and an established Thoroughbred breeder in the sport of polo. Her son, Del Carroll Walton is an established polo player and horseman.

His youngest daughter, Larkspur Carroll, studied veterinary medicine at Ohio State University, became a doctor of veterinary medicine, is a practice owner/member at CORE Therapies – the Veterinary Acupuncture and Chiropractic Clinic. She is also the mother to Aurea, Del W. Carroll's granddaughter.
