= Don Meade =

American jockey

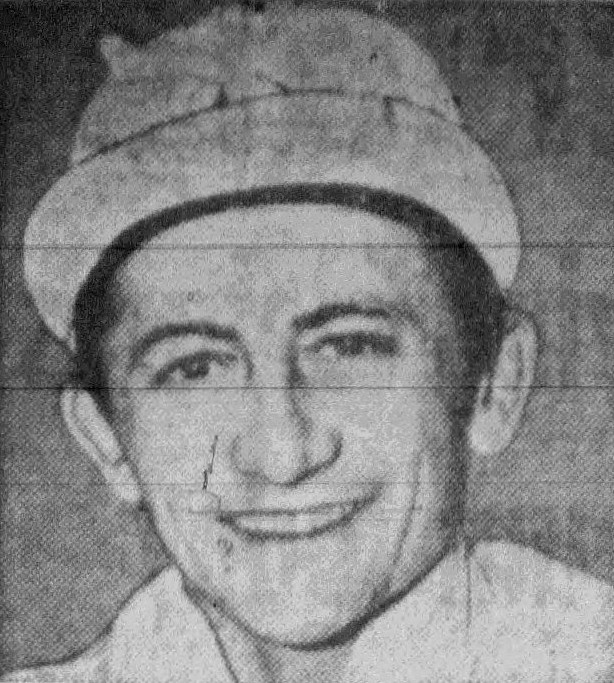
- Meade, circa 1942

Personal information
- Born: December 12, 1913 Plankinton, South Dakota
- Died: December 22, 1996 (aged 83) Hollywood, Florida
- Occupation: Jockey

Horse racing career
- Sport: Horse racing

Major racing wins
- Winnipeg Futurity (1930); Walden Stakes (1932, 1933); Alabama Stakes (1933, 1940); Champlain Handicap (1933, 1934); Havre de Grace Cup Handicap (1933); Bahamas Stakes (1934,1942); Remsen Stakes (1939); Saratoga Handicap (1939); Great American Stakes (1940); Questionnaire Handicap (1940, 1942); American Legion Handicap (1941); Fleetwing Handicap (1941); Rowe Memorial Handicap (1941); Juvenile Stakes (1942); U.S. Triple Crown race wins: Kentucky Derby (1933)

Racing awards
- United States Champion Jockey by wins (1939, 1941); United States Champion Jockey by earnings (1941)

Significant horses
- Brokers Tip, Time Supply, Black Helen, Discovery, Take Wing

Donald Lawrence Meade (December 12, 1913 – December 22, 1996) was an American National Champion jockey. Called the "Bad Boy" of the sport by Time magazine because of his numerous suspensions and fines, he is widely remembered as a result of his win on Brokers Tip in the 1933 Kentucky Derby.

== Background ==
Meade began riding ponies as a child and eventually horses at bush tracks and at county Fair races. In the summer of 1929 he rode horses for the mayor of his hometown who contacted a friend, trainer Sam Orr, who agreed to take Meade on as an apprentice. In July 1930, Meade got his first win aboard Queens Bessie at Lansdowne Park in Richmond, British Columbia.

== The "Fighting Finish" ==
In what became known as the "Fighting Finish", Don Meade on Brokers Tip and jockey Herb Fisher aboard Head Play battled their way to the finish line of the 1933 Kentucky Derby. Head Play was leading when Meade sent Brokers Tip through an opening on the inside to pull even. As the horses ran side by side down the stretch, their jockeys grabbed and whipped each other. The racing stewards declared Brokers Tip the winner by a nose. A photo of the Fighting Finish taken by a photographer for the Louisville Courier-Journal is one of the most widely recognized in Thoroughbred racing.

Meade died on December 22, 1996, in Hollywood, Florida at age 83.
