= Artax (horse) =

American-bred Thoroughbred racehorse

- Sire: Marquetry
- Grandsire: Conquistador Cielo
- Dam: Raging Apalachee
- Damsire: Apalachee
- Sex: Stallion
- Foaled: 1995
- Died: 2012
- Country: United States
- Colour: Dark Bay/Brown
- Breeder: Vinery Stud & Carondelet Farm
- Owner: Paraneck Stable
- Trainer: Louis Albertrani
- Record: 25: 7-9-3
- Earnings: US$1,685,840

Major wins
- Santa Catalina Stakes (1998); San Felipe Stakes (1998); Carter Handicap (1999); Forest Hills Handicap (1999); Vosburgh Stakes (1999) Breeders' Cup wins: Breeders' Cup Sprint (1999)

Awards
- American Champion Sprint Horse (1999)
- Last updated on June 20, 2010

Artax (1995–2012) was a champion American Thoroughbred racehorse who won the 1999 Breeders' Cup Sprint and was the 1999 American Champion Sprint Horse. He also won the Carter Handicap and Vosburgh Stakes and equaled or broke three track records.

Artax was named after a horse featured in the children's fantasy novel The Neverending Story.

During the 1999 running of the Maryland Breeders' Cup, an inebriated man (Lee Chang Ferrell) walked under the rail at Pimlico Racecourse on Preakness Day and stood in front of the field. As Artax came by, he attempted to hit him and the horse moved over several paths, making contact with other horses and wrenching his ankle. Ferrell was not injured. All betting money on the horse, who was the 4/5 favorite, was refunded.

Artax was retired to stud in 2000. He stood at several farms, including Clermont Farm in New York, Taylor Made Farm in Kentucky and Diamond G Ranch in Edmond, Oklahoma, before being moved to Haras Santa Tereza do Bom Retiro in Brazil. His most notable offspring include Diabolical, winner of the Alfred Vanderbilt Handicap, and Grade I winner Friendly Michelle.

Artax died on January 8, 2012, in an equine hospital in Brazil due to complications from colic.
