= Arise (horse) =

American-bred Thoroughbred racehorse

- Sire: He Did
- Grandsire: Victorian
- Dam: Coralie B.
- Damsire: Apprehension
- Sex: Stallion
- Foaled: 1946
- Country: United States
- Colour: Brown
- Breeder: R. M. Wood
- Owner: Addison Stable
- Trainer: James C. Bentley
- Record: 51: 19-8-12
- Earnings: $199,990

Major wins
- Canadian Championship Stakes (1949); Travers Stakes (1949); Sysonby Handicap (1950); Fall Highweight Handicap (1950); American Legion Handicap (1950); Excelsior Handicap (1950); Carter Handicap (1951); Monmouth Handicap (1951); Questionnaire Handicap (1951)

Honours
- Canadian Horse Racing Hall of Fame (1983)

Arise (foaled 1946 at Hamburg Place in Kentucky) was a Canadian Hall of Fame Thoroughbred racehorse.

== Background ==
Arise was sired by the 1936 Santa Anita Derby winner, He Did, a son of the 1928 Preakness Stakes winner, Victorian. Out of the dam Coralie B., his damsire Apprehension was a grandson of English Triple Crown champion, Rock Sand.

Breeder R. M. Wood sold Arise in 1946 to Torontonians Harry Addison Sr. and Mrs. Jack Addison. They entrusted the colt's race conditioning to future Canadian Horse Racing Hall of Fame trainer, Jim Bentley.

== Racing career ==
In 1948 the two-year-old Arise was sent south to race in New York State where he won twice and was notably second in the Youthful Stakes, a race that at the time was one of the most important of the year for juveniles. As a three-year-old in 1949, Arise earned wins of importance in both Canada and the United States. At Toronto's Thorncliffe Park Raceway he set a track record for six furlongs and at Long Branch Racetrack he won the Canadian Championship Stakes. Racing in the United States, at New York's Saratoga Race Course Arise captured the Travers Stakes, marking the first-ever win in that prestigious race by a Canadian-owned horse. In the Jerome Handicap, he finished second by a nose to Capot. At age four, Arise continue to perform with the best. At Aqueduct Racetrack in Queens, New York he won the Excelsior Handicap and the Fall Highweight Handicap plus the American Legion Handicap at Saratoga Race Course.

Arise was sent back to the track at age six and won the 1951 Monmouth Handicap, the Questionnaire Handicap and defeated Piet in winning the Carter Handicap.

== Stud record ==
Retired from racing, in 1953 Arise was sent to stand at stud at Kentucky's renowned Claiborne Farm. His time as a stallion was limited as he produced only a few offspring in 1954 and 1955, non of which met with racing success.
