= Yankee Handicap =

The Yankee Handicap was an American Thoroughbred horse race first run at the 1935 opening meet of Suffolk Downs in East Boston, Massachusetts. A race for three-year-olds, it was contested on dirt at a mile and an eighth. (9 furlongs) and was usually held on the Columbus Day holiday. A February 19, 1989, issue of the Boston Globe said that the Yankee Handicap "used to be the hallmark of the fall [racing] season."

Last run in 1987, the race was won by stars such as Cravat (1938); Challedon (1939); Our Boots (1941); Shut Out (1942), who broke the track record; Never Bend (1963); and Timely Writer (1982).
