= Devil Diver =

American-bred Thoroughbred racehorse

- Sire: St Germans
- Grandsire: Swynford
- Dam: Dabchick
- Damsire: Royal Minstrel
- Sex: Stallion
- Foaled: 1939
- Died: 1961 (aged 21–22)
- Country: United States
- Colour: Bay
- Breeder: Greentree Stable
- Owner: Helen Hay Whitney
- Trainer: John M. Gaver, Sr.
- Record: 47: 22-12-3
- Earnings: US$261,064

Major wins
- Breeders' Futurity Stakes (1941); Hopeful Stakes (1941); Sanford Stakes (1941); Phoenix Handicap (1942); Brooklyn Handicap (1943); Metropolitan Handicap (1943, 1944, 1945); Carter Handicap (1943); Toboggan Handicap (1943, 1944); Whitney Stakes (1944); Wilson Stakes (1944); Manhattan Handicap (1944); Paumonok Handicap (1944, 1945)

Awards
- DRF American Champion Older Male Horse (1943); American Champion Older Male Horse (1944)

Honours
- Aiken Thoroughbred Racing Hall of Fame (1977); United States' Racing Hall of Fame (1980) #55 - Top 100 U.S. Racehorses of the 20th Century

Devil Diver (1939–1961) was an American Thoroughbred racehorse. He was twice voted American Champion Older Male Horse.

== Background ==
Devil Diver was foaled at Mrs. Payne Whitney's Greentree Stable in Lexington, Kentucky. A bay colt by Sir Germans, he was out of Dabchick, and a member of the same foal crop as Shut Out. Devil Diver was trained by Hall of Fame conditioner John M. Gaver, Sr., who also trained Shut Out.

== Racing career ==
Both Shut Out and Devil Diver were pointed towards the 1942 Kentucky Derby, especially as Devil Diver had opened his three-year-old season winning the Phoenix Handicap while beating Whirlaway, who the year before had won the United States Triple Crown of Thoroughbred Racing.

Hall of Fame jockey Eddie Arcaro believed Devil Diver to be the superior horse (he hadn't been out of the money in 13 starts) and chose to ride him in the Derby, only to come in sixth as Shut Out won under jockey Wayne Wright by two lengths over Alsab. At three, of the two best Whitney colts, Shut Out prevailed. But at four, Devil Diver came into his own, living up to the promise of his two-and-three-year-old seasons. At the end of 1943, he was named Champion Handicap Horse by the Daily Racing Form, although the rival Turf & Sports Digest award went to Market Wise. In 1944, he was named Champion Handicap Horse in both major polls. He also came close to American Horse of the Year but lost the Pimlico Special to the filly Twilight Tear in a three-horse race that included the very good Megogo.

Devil Diver holds a record that has never been broken. He won the Metropolitan Handicap in three consecutive years: 1943, 1944, and 1945. One of those wins, 1944, was accomplished under an unbroken record weight of 134 pounds. In his Suburban Handicap win, he gave the champion Stymie thirteen pounds. In 1944, the five-year-old Devil Diver won seven stakes race while carrying more than 130 pounds in each. Better with age, at five he competed at a variety of distances under a variety of weights, all heavy. In his last year, he was voted handicap horse of the season in both polls.

== Stud record ==
Devil Diver stood at stud at Greentree Farm. He was not outstanding but sired 18 stakes winners including Beau Diable, Call Over, Lotowhite, and the good broodmare Anchors Aweigh.

Devil Diver died in 1961.

== Sire line tree ==
- Devil Diver
  - Call Over
  - Lotowhite
  - Crash Dive
  - Beau Diable
    - Dare Devil
