= John M. Gaver Jr. =

Personal information
- Born: September 17, 1940 United States
- Died: January 15, 2002 (aged 61) Hollywood, Florida
- Occupation: Trainer

Horse racing career
- Sport: Horse racing
- Career wins: 580

Major racing wins
- Royal Palm Handicap (1976); New York Handicap (1978); Peter Pan Stakes (1978); Sanford Stakes (1978); Saranac Handicap (1978); Sheepshead Bay Handicap (1978); Arlington Handicap (1979); Black Helen Handicap (1979); Turf Classic Invitational Handicap (1979); Man o' War Stakes (1979); Oaklawn Handicap (1979); Washington, D.C. International Stakes (1979); Louisiana Derby (1980, 1981); Rothmans International Stakes (1981)

Significant horses
- Bowl Game, Late Bloomer, Woodchopper

John Milton "Jack" Gaver Jr. (September 17, 1940 – January 15, 2002) was an American trainer of Thoroughbred racehorses. He was the son of National Museum of Racing and Hall of Fame trainer John M. Gaver Sr., who was head trainer for the Whittney family's Greentree Stable for 38 years. In 1977 his father suffered a stroke and John Jr. took over his responsibilities at Greentree where he would remain for the next fifteen years. For Greentree he trained back-to-back Champions Late Bloomer in 1978 and Bowl Game in 1979.

Among his important wins, John Gaver Jr. won the most important turf races at the time including the 1979 Turf Classic Invitational Handicap and Washington, D.C. International Stakes (Forerunner to the Breeders' Cup), and in 1981 the Rothmans International Stakes.

John Gaver Jr. died at age 61 in Hollywood, Florida where he had been working as a track steward. He was buried in the Lexington Cemetery in Lexington, Kentucky.
