= John M. Gaver Sr. =

American racehorse trainer (1900–1982)

Personal information
- Born: October 29, 1900 Mount Airy, Maryland, U.S.
- Died: July 11, 1982 (aged 81) Aiken, South Carolina
- Occupation: Trainer

Horse racing career
- Sport: Horse racing
- Career wins: Not found

Major racing wins
- Bay Shore Handicap (1939, 1948); Edgemere Handicap (1939, 1940, 1942, 1951); Lawrence Realization Stakes (1939, 1946, 1956); Metropolitan Handicap (1940, 1943, 1944, 1945, 1953, 1963); Narragansett Special (1940, 1951); Empire City Handicap (1941, 1944, 1952); Fashion Stakes (1941); Grand Union Hotel Stakes (1941, 1951, 1956); Hopeful Stakes (1941, 1962); Sanford Stakes (1941, 1951, 1956, 1963); Arlington Classic (1942, 1951); Blue Grass Stakes (1942); Travers Stakes (1942); Whitney Handicap (1942, 1944, 1951, 1953, 1958); Brooklyn Handicap (1943, 1944, 1953, 1958, 1963); Carter Handicap (1943, 1950, 1952, 1953); Champlain Handicap (1943, 1951); American Legion Handicap (1944, 1955); Wood Memorial Stakes (1944, 1963); Suburban Handicap (1945, 1952, 1953, 1954); Great American Stakes (1947); Champagne Stakes (1940, 1948, 1972); Pimlico Futurity (1948); Chesapeake Stakes (1949); Pimlico Special (1949, 1953); Saratoga Cup (1949); Sysonby Handicap (1949, 1952, 1953, 1958); Belmont Futurity Stakes (1951); Massachusetts Handicap (1951); Saratoga Handicap (1952); Dwyer Stakes (1956, 1963, 1968, 1973); Saranac Stakes (1957, 1963, 1968); Juvenile Stakes (1962); Long Island Handicap (1962, 1966, 1969); Man o' War Stakes (1963); Canadian International Stakes (1963); Tremont Stakes (1968) American Classic Race wins: Kentucky Derby (1942); Preakness Stakes (1949); Belmont Stakes (1942, 1949, 1968)

Racing awards
- United States Champion Trainer by earnings (1942, 1951)

Honors
- National Museum of Racing and Hall of Fame (1966)

Significant horses
- Shut Out, Capot, No Robbery, Tom Fool, Stage Door Johnny, Stop The Music, Devil Diver, One Hitter

John Milton Gaver Sr. (October 29, 1900 – July 11, 1982) was an American Hall of Fame Thoroughbred racehorse trainer.

Born in Mount Airy, Maryland, John Gaver graduated from Princeton University then worked as a prep school language teacher before eventually embarking on a career in Thoroughbred racing. In 1929, James G. Rowe Jr., a friend and horse trainer, invited him to join the team managing the Brookdale Farm and racing stable owned by Harry Payne Whitney.

After Harry Payne Whitney died in 1930, James Rowe Jr. took over the running of the Mrs. Payne Whitney family's Greentree Stable and asked John Gaver to come with him. In 1939, Gaver was appointed head trainer for Greentree Stable, a position he would hold for the next thirty-eight years. During his time with Greentree, John Gaver conditioned seventy-three stakes-winning horses, including winners of five American Classic Races. Four of his horses earned Champions honors with Capot and Tom Fool voted Horse of the Year in 1946 and 1953 respectively.

In 1966 John Gaver was inducted into the National Museum of Racing and Hall of Fame. In 1977 he suffered a stroke and his son John Jr. took over as trainer for the Greentree Stable. He retired to Aiken, South Carolina where he had maintained a winter training center for many years. He died there at Aiken Community Hospital in 1982 and was buried in the Lexington Cemetery, Lexington, Kentucky.

Selected other major race wins:

- Lexington Stakes (1936)
- Diana Handicap (1940)
- Breeders' Futurity (1941, 1950, 1952)
- Gazelle Handicap (1941, 1967)
- Top Flight Handicap (1941)
- Phoenix Handicap (1942)
- Widener Handicap (1942)
- Toboggan Handicap (1943, 1944)
- Arlington-Washington Lassie Stakes (1944)
- Manhattan Handicap (1944)
- Paumonok Handicap (1944, 1945)
- Vosburgh Stakes (1946)
- Peter Pan Stakes (1947)
- Jerome Handicap (1949, 1952)
- American Derby (1951)
- Belmont Futurity Stakes (1951)
- Fall Highweight Handicap (1951)
- Monmouth Oaks (1951)
- Empire City Handicap (1952)
- Philip H. Iselin Handicap (1952)
- Wilson Stakes (1952, 1953)
- Miss Woodford Stakes (1953)
- Jim Dandy Stakes (1964)
- Saranac Handicap (1968)
- Aqueduct Handicap (1965)
- Ladies Handicap (1967)
- Tremont Stakes (1968)
- Saratoga Special Stakes (1972)
