= Greentree Stable =

Thoroughbred racehorse stable

- Type: Thoroughbred Racing Stable & Horse breeding Farm
- Industry: Thoroughbred Horse racing
- Founded: 1914
- Defunct: 1989
- Headquarters: Red Bank, New Jersey
Key people
Payne Whitney
(owner 1914–1927)
Helen Hay Whitney
(owner 1927–1944)
Joan & Jock Whitney
(co-owners, 1944–1982)
Trainers: Thomas W. Murphy (1928–1930)
James G. Rowe, Jr. (1931)
William Brennan (1932–1938)
John M. Gaver, Sr. (1939–1977)
John M. Gaver, Jr. (1978–1981)
- Divisions: Aiken, South Carolina (training center); Lexington, Kentucky (breeding farm)

Greentree Stable, in Red Bank, New Jersey, was a major American thoroughbred horse racing stable and breeding farm established in 1914 by Payne Whitney of the Whitney family of New York City. Payne Whitney operated a horse farm and stable at Saratoga Springs, New York with his brother Harry Payne Whitney, who also had a large stable of horses. Greentree Stable had a training base at Aiken, South Carolina, while Greentree Farm in Lexington, Kentucky was established in 1925 as its breeding arm. Its racing colors were pink with black-striped sleeves.

== History ==
After Whitney's steeplechase horse won the 1911 Greentree Cup race at Great Neck, New York, it was decided to use the Greentree name for several of their properties. Following Payne Whitney's death in 1927, his widow, Helen Hay Whitney, took over the operation. Her son John Hay Whitney was also involved in Thoroughbred racing especially so with his wife Liz Whitney. Daughter Joan Whitney Payson raced horses under the nom de course Manhasset Stable. On their mother's death, they continued to build on Greentree Stable's success.

Greentree Stable horses won many important steeplechase and flat races throughout the United States. As part of a program honoring important Thoroughbred tracks and racing stables, the Pennsylvania Railroad named its baggage car #5859 the Greentree Stable. In January 1928, Thomas W. Murphy, a renowned harness racing trainer, became head trainer for Greentree Stable. Murphy stayed until the end of the 1930 Pimlico fall meeting, and was replaced by James G. Rowe, Jr.

Trained by Rowe, the Whitney stable's colt Twenty Grand earned the Eclipse Award for Horse of the Year in 1931 and was inducted into the National Museum of Racing and Hall of Fame in Saratoga Springs, New York in 1957. Hall of Fame trainer John M. Gaver, Sr., who won the Belmont Stakes for the stable three times, trained Devil Diver, Champion Handicap Horse in 1943–1944 and the 1953 Horse of the Year Tom Fool. Both horses were also voted into the Hall of Fame: Devil Diver in 1980 and Tom Fool in 1960. Helen Whitney's steeplechasers won the American Grand National four times (1926–1928 and 1937). Her horse Jolly Roger (who won the Grand National twice) was inducted into the Hall of Fame in 1965. Greentree Stable also had polo ponies and steeplechasers, one of which won the 1946 American Grand National. Other steeplechasers raced in England and Ireland.

After the deaths of John and Joan Whitney, their heirs sold the Kentucky property to its current owners, Gainesway Farm, in 1989. The equestrian estate in Saratoga Springs was offered for sale in 2005.

== U.S. Triple Crown race winners ==
- Kentucky Derby:
  - 1931: Twenty Grand
  - 1942: Shut Out
- Preakness Stakes:
  - 1949: Capot
- Belmont Stakes:
  - 1931: Twenty Grand
  - 1942: Shut Out
  - 1949: Capot
  - 1968: Stage Door Johnny
