= John B. Campbell Handicap top three finishers =

This is a listing of the horses that finished in either first, second, or third place and the number of starters in the John B. Campbell Handicap, an American stakes race for horses three years old and older at 1-1/8 miles (9 furlongs) on the dirt held at Laurel Park Racecourse in Laurel, Maryland. (List 1954-present)

Year	Winner	Second	Third	Starters
2021	Bankit	Galerio	Cordmaker	8
2020	Alwaysmining	Monongahela	Someday Jones	6
2019	Bonus Points	Monongahela	Unbridled Juan	12
2018	Afleet Willy	Zenotti	Dattt Melody	6
2017	Bodhisattva	Page McKinney	Charitable Annuity	9
2016	Kid Cruz	Souper Lucky	Kobel	10
2015	Page McKenney	Behemoth	A. P. Cino	11
2014	Behemoth	Managed Account	Concealed Identity	5
2013	Concealed Identity	Norman Asbjornson	Service for Ten	6
2012	Jimanator	Thunder Lord	Heart Butte	6
2011	Alma d'Oro	Fonda Ronda Won	Auctoritas	6
2010	Redding Colliery	Indian Dance	Atoned	9
2009	Richard's Kid	Bullsbay	PV Lightening	n/a
2008	Nite Light	Happy Sunrise	Angliana	n/a
2007	Future Fantasy	Due	Bank President	n/a
2006	Your Bluffing	Water Cannon	Whats What	n/a
2005	Coast Line	Offlee Wild	Ole Faunty	n/a
2004	Old Faunty	Evening Attire	Rogue Agent	n/a
2003	Tempest Fugit	Quiet Gratitude	Lyracist	n/a
2002	Lyracist	Private Ryan	Top Official	n/a
2001	Do I Ever	Tibado	Top Official	n/a
2000	Salty Note	Leave It to Beezer	Over tu You	n/a
1999	Crosspatch	Waited	Carta de Amor	n/a
1998	Hot Brush	Fireside Brass	Praise Heaven	n/a
1997	Traffic Circle	Clash by Night	Meadow Lad	n/a
1996	Sunny Sunrise	Western Echo	Knockadoon	n/a
1995	Ameri Valay	Dixie Hero	South Bend	n/a
1994	Ameri Valay	Greatsilverfleet	Super Memory	n/a
1993	Sunny Sunrise	Ibex	Ameri Valay	n/a
1992	Sunny Sunrise	Valley Crossing	Makin Money	n/a
1991	J. R.'s Horizon	Reputed Testamony	Loyal Pal	n/a
1990	Jet Stream	Flaming Emperor	Silano	n/a
1989	Little Bold John	Templar Hill	Finder's Choice	n/a
1988	Manzotti	Ron Stevens	Little Bold John	n/a
1987	Broad Brush	Proud Debonair	Little Bold John	n/a
1986	Skip Trial	Regal Count	Majestic Solo	n/a
1985	Imp Society	Moro	Light Spirits	n/a
1984	Island Champ	Forceful Intent	Luxuriant Man	n/a
1983	Recusant	Hail Emperor	Appeal Approved	n/a
1982	Majesty's World	Sunny Winters	Thirty Eight Paces	n/a
1981	Relaxing	Irish Tower	Peat Moss	n/a
1980	Pole Position	Majesty's World	Frejus	n/a
1979	Mister Brea	Ripon	Silent Cal	n/a
1978	Ripon	Resound	Gala Harry	n/a
1977	No Race	No Race	No Race	n/a
1976	Festive Mood	Right Mind	Jolly Johu	n/a
1975	Jolly Johu	Spirit Rock	Continuous Count	n/a
1974	True Knight	Delay	Ecole Etage	n/a
1973 #	Vertee	Amber Hawk	Favorecidian	n/a
1973 #	Delay	Lexington Park	Burning On	n/a
1972 #	Favorecidian	Pro Bidder	Archie Spears	n/a
1972 #	Boone the Great	Never Wink	Towzie Tyke	n/a
1971	Bushido	Never Bow	True North	n/a
1970 #	Best Turn	Sea Castle	North Flight	n/a
1970 #	Mitey Prince	Bushido	Spring Double	n/a
1969	Juvenile John	Barbs Delight	Iron Ruler	n/a
1968	In Reality	Barbs Delight	Peter Piper	n/a
1967	Quinta	Model Fool	Exceedingly	n/a
1966	Tosmah	Just About	Tornado	n/a
1965	Lt. Stevens	Knightly Manner	Viking Spirits	n/a
1964	Mongo	Gun Bow	Uppercut	n/a
1963	Kelso	Crimson Satan	Gushing Wind	n/a
1962	Yorktown	Globemaster	Beau Prince	n/a
1961	Conestoga	April Skies	All Hands	n/a
1960	Yes You Will	Restless Wind	Amerigo	n/a
1959	Vertex	Backbone	Talent Show	n/a
1958	Promised Land	Find	Bernburgoo	n/a
1957	Dedicate	Third Brother	Akbar Khan	n/a
1956	Sailor	Joe Jones	Fisherman	n/a
1955	Social Outcast	Fisherman	Helioscope	n/a
1954	Joe Jones	Impasse	Prince Hill	n/a

A # designates that the race was run in two divisions in 1973, 1972 and 1970.
