= Geisha Stakes =

- Class: Restricted State-bred Stakes
- Location: Pimlico Race Course, Baltimore, Maryland, United States; OR; Laurel Park Racecourse, Laurel, Maryland, United States
- Inaugurated: 1973
- Race type: Thoroughbred – Flat racing
- Website: www.marylandthoroughbred.com/newsindex.php?articleid=953

Race information
- Distance: 1 mile (8 furlongs)
- Surface: Dirt
- Track: left-handed
- Qualification: Three-year-olds & up; fillies and mares
- Purse: $125,000

Geisha Stakes is an American Thoroughbred horse race held annually in April since 1973 primarily at Pimlico Race Course in Baltimore or at Laurel Park Racecourse in Laurel. To be eligible for the Geisha Handicap, a horse must be bred in Maryland. Due to that restriction the race is classified as a non-graded or "listed" stakes race and is not eligible for grading by the American Graded Stakes Committee.

In 2012 the Geisha Stakes is run at one mile. The race was run at 1 1/16 miles for its first 30 years in existence from 1973–2003. The race was run on the turf one year in 1988.

In its 39th running in 2010, the race was named in honor of Alfred G. Vanderbilt's Geisha, a Maryland-bred daughter of Discovery and bred by John P. Grier. She was foaled at the famed Sagamore Farm in Glyndon, Maryland in 1943. She was bred to Preakness Stakes winner Polynesian and produced Native Dancer in 1950, one of the greatest race horses and sires of the 20th century.

== Records ==
Speed record:

- 1 1/16 miles (8.5 furlongs) : 1:42.20 – Any Spray (1984)
- 1 1/8 miles (9 furlongs) : 1:51.40 – Prominade Girl (2004)

Most wins by an owner:

- 4 – Stephen Quick (2004, 2007, 2008 & 2009)

Most wins by a jockey:

- 4 – William J. Passmore (1974, 1975, 1976 and 1980)

Most wins by a trainer:

- 4 – Christopher W. Grove (2004, 2007, 2008 & 2009)

== Winners of the Geisha Stakes ==
Year	Winner	Age	Jockey	Trainer	Owner	Dist. (Miles)	Time	Purse$
2022	Kiss the Girl	5	Victor Carrasco	Michael Trombetta	Three Diamonds Farm	1-1/16	1:40.69	$100,000
2021	Gale	4	Sheldon Russell	Jonathan Thomas	Robert V. LaPenta	1-1/16	1:39.24	$100,000
2020	Artful Splatter	4	Alex Cintron	Kieron Magee	James C. Wolf	1-1/16	1:39.46	$100,000
2019	Race not held							
2018	Victory Rally	4	Jose Vargas	Michael R. Matz	Richard L. Golden	1-1/16	1:38.08	$75,000
2017	My Magician	5	Jomar Torres	Claudio Gonzalez	Euro Stable	1-1/16	1:37.20	$75,000
2016	Rockin Jojo	4	Frankie Pennington	James Ness	Michael Cox	1-1/16	1:39.42	$100,000
2015	Brenda's Way	5	Jevian Toledo	Damon Dilodovico	Big Bertha Stable	1-1/16	1:46.78	$100,000
2014	Celtic Kate	5	Javier Santiago	Christopher W. Grove	Lewis Family Racing	1-1/16	1:46.67	$100,000
2013	Access To Charlie	5	Julian Pimentel	Lawrence E. Murray	Howard M. Bender	1 mile	1:39.56	$125,000
2012	Bold Affair	4	Abel Castellano Jr.	Howard Wolfendale	Charles Reed & M.Zanella	1 mile	1:38.31	$125,000
2011	Baltimore Belle	4	Julian Pimentel	Michael Trombetta	R. Larry Johnson	1 mile	1:37.72	$75,000
2010	Fascinatin' Rhythm	5	Forest Boyce	Richard W. Small	Buckingham Farm	1 mile	1:37.14	$75,000
2009	Princess Nyla	4	Julian Pimentel	Christopher W. Grove	Stephen Quick	1-1/16	1:45.43	$75,000
2008	Lexi Star	6	Jeremy Rose	Christopher W. Grove	Stephen Quick	1-1/16	1:43.76	$75,000
2007	Lexi Star	5	J. D. Acosta	Christopher W. Grove	Stephen Quick	1-1/8	1:53.40	$75,000
2006	Sassy Love	5	Luis Garcia	Casey J. Randall	Michael J. Harrison	1-1/8	1:54.00	$75,000
2005	Promenade Girl	3	Erick Rodriguez	Lawrence E. Murray	Sondra D. Bender	1-1/8	1:51.40	$75,000
2004	Silmaril	3	Abel Castellano Jr.	Christopher W. Grove	Stephen E. Quick	1-1/8	1:53.80	$100,000
2003	Cruise Along	5	Abel Castellano Jr.	Lawrence E. Murray	Sondra D. Bender	1-1/16	1:42.80	$100,000
2002	Shiny Sheet	4	Jeremy Rose	Charles H. Hadry	Henry T. Rathburn	1-1/16	1:44.40	$100,000
2001	Shine Again	4	Jean-Luc Samyn	H. Allen Jerkens	Bohemia Stable	1-1/16	1:43.60	$100,000
2000	Unbridled Lady	4	Mario Pino	Robin L. Graham	Alan S. Kline	1-1/16	1:44.80	$100,000
1999	Truth and Nobility	4	Steve Capanas	Roger J. Seeger	Briter Stable	1-1/16	1:43.60	$100,000
1998	Weather Vane	4	Mario Pino	Richard W. Delp	Par Four Racing Stable	1-1/16	1:43.80	$100,000
1997	Churchbell Chimes	6	Edgar S. Prado	J. William Boniface	Susan Y. Granville	1-1/16	1:42.80	$100,000
1996	Urbane	4	Jose Valdivia Jr.	Randy Bradshaw	Siegel Family	1-1/16	1:44.00	$100,000
1995	Calipha	4	Kent Desormeaux	Grover G. Delp	Nancy Bayard	1-1/16	1:50.00	$100,000
1994	Stars Knockout	5	Richard Migliore	Michael E. Hushion	Liberation Farm	1-1/16	1:43.60	$100,000
1993	Green Darlin	4	Joe Bravo	Lawrence E. Murray	Howard & Sondra Bender	1-1/16	1:43.80	$100,000
1992	Brilliant Brass	5	Edgar Prado	Carlos A. Garcia	Elaine L. Bassford	1-1/16	1:43.00	$100,000
1991	Capp the Power	4	Mike Luzzi	Ronald Cartwright	C. Oliver Goldsmith	1-1/16	1:43.60	$100,000
1990	Thirty Eight Go Go	5	Donnie A. Miller Jr.	King T. Leatherbury	Janet Wayson	1-1/16	1:42.60	$100,000
1989	Thirty Eight Go Go	4	Kent Desormeaux	King T. Leatherbury	Janet Wayson	1-1/16	1:42.40	$100,000
1988	Thirty Eight Go Go	3	Donnie A. Miller Jr.	King T. Leatherbury	Janet Wayson	1-1/16	1:43.20	$80,000
1987	Alden's Ambition	6	Jesse Davidson	Jerry Robb	Hal C. B. Clagett	1-1/16	1:44.00	$60,000
1986	Owned by All	6	Vincent Bracciale Jr.	Richard W. Small	Baird C. Brittingham	1-1/16	1:44.80	$60,000
1985	Owned by All	5	Danny Wright	Richard W. Small	Baird C. Brittingham	1-1/16	1:42.40	$60,000
1984	Any Spray	4	Dave Byrnes	Beverly P. Hacker	John A. Manfuso	1-1/16	1:42.20	$60,000
1983	Kattegat's Pride	4	Donnie A. Miller Jr.	Joseph A. Devereux	Stephen E. Quick	1-1/16	1:45.40	$60,000
1982	Zvetlana	4	Leroy Moyers	Filemon Veriay	Mrs. Augustus Riggs IV	1-1/16	1:45.00	$60,000
1981	Weber City Miss	4	Ángel Cordero Jr.	Howard M. Tesher	H. Joseph Allen	1-1/16	1:44.00	$60,000
1980	Jameela	4	William J. Passmore	Hyman M. Ravich	Richard W. Worthington	1-1/16	1:44.40	$60,000
1979	Pearl Necklace	5	Ruben Hernandez	Roger Laurin	Reginald N. Webster	1-1/16	1:43.20	$60,000
1978	Luck Penny	5	Ronald Ardoin	Bernard P. Bond	Thomas J. Barry	1-1/16	1:47.00	$35,000
1977	Gala Lil	5	George Cusimano	Bernard P. Bond	Mrs. Gertude Leviton	1-1/16	1:42.60	$27,500
1976 #	Gala Lil	4	Leroy Moyers	Bernard P. Bond	Mrs. Gertude Leviton	1-1/16	1:51.00	$100,000
1976 #	Crackerfax	5	William J. Passmore	Thomas C. Patterson	Fourbros Stable	1-1/16	1:44.00	$25,000
1975	Twixt	6	William J. Passmore	Katherine M. Voss	Mrs. John M. Franklin	1-1/16	1:44.60	$35,000
1974	Twixt	5	William J. Passmore	Katherine M. Voss	Mrs. John M. Franklin	1-1/16	1:45.00	$35,000
1973	Alma North	5	Ron Turcotte	Frank J. Zitto	East Acres Farm	1-1/16	1:42.80	$28,000

== See also ==
- Geisha Handicap top three finishers
