= Farda Amiga =

American-bred Thoroughbred racehorse

- Sire: Broad Brush
- Grandsire: Ack Ack
- Dam: Fly North
- Damsire: Pleasant Colony
- Sex: Mare
- Foaled: February 1, 1999
- Country: United States
- Colour: Bay
- Breeder: Payson Stud Inc
- Owner: Jose DeCamargo (Santa Escolastica Stable), Julio Camargo (Old Friends Inc) and Marcos Simon (Winner Silk).
- Trainer: Paulo Lobo
- Record: 8: 4-1-0
- Earnings: $1,282,302

Major wins
- Kentucky Oaks (2002); Alabama Stakes (2002)

Awards
- American Champion Three-Year-Old Filly (2002)

Farda Amiga (foaled February 1, 1999) is an American Thoroughbred racehorse and broodmare. Bred in Kentucky, but owned and trained by Brazilian horsemen, she showed some promise racing on turf as a juvenile in 2001, winning on her racecourse debut and finishing fifth at Grade III level on her only subsequent start. In the following season she won one of her first two races on turf before being switched to run on dirt and showed improved form. After a third-place finish in the Santa Anita Oaks, she recorded an upset win in the Kentucky Oaks and then recovered from illness to win the Alabama Stakes in August. She was retired after finishing second to the American Horse of the Year Azeri in the Breeders' Cup Distaff. Her record as broodmare has not been impressive.

== Background ==
Farda Amiga is a bay mare with no white markings bred in Kentucky by Payson Stud Inc. She was sired by Broad Brush who won the Wood Memorial and the Santa Anita Handicap before becoming a highly successful breeding stallion earning the title of Leading sire in North America in 1994: among his other progeny were the Breeders' Cup Classic winner Concern and the Pimlico Special winner Include. Farda Amiga was the first foal of her dam Fly North, who won three races and finished second up in the 1995 running of the Natalma Stakes. Fly North's dam Dry North was a half-sister of the Kentucky-bred St Jovite, winner of the Irish Derby and the King George VI and Queen Elizabeth Stakes in 1991.

In September 2000, the yearling filly was consigned by the Taylor Made Sales Agency to the Keeneland sale where she was bought for $45,000 by Jose DeCamargo's Santa Escolastica Stable. The filly was sent into training in 2001 with Paulo Lobo, who had recently moved to California from his native Brazil. During her racing career, the filly raced in a partnership involving Jose DeCamargo, Julio Camargo (Old Friends Inc) and Marcos Simon (Winner Silk Inc). Her name means "Friendly Silks" in Portuguese, combining the stable names of two of her owners.

== Racing career ==
=== 2001: two-year-old season ===
On her track debut, Farda Amiga contested a one-mile maiden race on turf at Del Mar on September 3. Ridden by Goncalino Almeida, she was not among the leaders in the early stages but moved up on the outside on the turn, took the lead a furlong and drew clear to win by two and a half lengths from the favored Puff the Magic. On her only other appearance of the season she was moved up in class and started a 24.6/1 outsider for the Grade III Miesque Stakes at Hollywood Park Racetrack on 23 November. She pulled against Almeida's attempts to restrain her in early stages before settling, but lost ground on the backstretch. The filly made some progress in the latter stages to finish fifth, three lengths behind the wire-to-wire winner Forty On Line.

=== 2002: three-year-old season ===
On her first appearance as a three-year-old, in the Blue Norther Stakes at Santa Anita Park on January 9, Farda Amiga was never better than fourth before finishing last of the seven finishers behind Megahertz. Chris McCarron took over the ride from Almeida, when Farda Amiga was dropped in class for an allowance race over the same track a month later. The filly was blocked as McCarron struggled to obtain a clear run before making rapid ground along the rail, taking the lead in the final stride and winning by a head from Ile de France. She was then switched to the dirt for the first time in the Grade I Santa Anita Oaks on March 9 and started a 35.2/1 outsider. After being outpaced and running last of the nine fillies early on she made steady progress on the outside to finish third behind You, Habibti and Ile de France, two lengths behind the winner.

On May 3, in front of a 101,923 at Churchill Downs Farda Amiga, with McCarron again in the saddle, started a 20/1 outsider in a ten-runner field for the 128th running of the Kentucky Oaks. The Ashland Stakes winner Take Charge Lady started favorite ahead of You, the Godolphin Racing filly Imperial Gesture and Habibti. She was not among the early leaders but made progress along the backstretch to join the leaders approaching the final turn. She began to drift to the inside in the stretch, slightly hampering Habibti before McCarron switched his whip to his left hand and sent the filly in pursuit of the leader Take Charge Lady. Farda Amiga caught the favorite inside the final furlong and drew ahead to win by one and a quarter lengths with Habibti third ahead of You, and a gap of twelve lengths back to the other fillies. An objection to the winner by Habibti's rider Victor Espinoza was not upheld by the racecourse stewards. The filly's success attracted interest in Brazil, where the race was broadcast live. Lobo called the winner "an amazing filly", adding "How big is this in Brazil?", whilst McCarron, commenting on the jubilant scenes after the race commented, "I've been involved with a lot of ebullient celebrations, but these people came a long way to be here. They were showing their enthusiasm."

On the morning after the Oaks, Farda Amiga was found to be running a temperature and had an abnormally high white blood cell count. She remained in Kentucky for two weeks before returning to California for further recuperation. After a break of over three months, Farda Amiga returned at Saratoga Race Course on August 17 in the Alabama Stakes, in which she was ridden for the first time by Pat Day. On the day before the race, she gave her owners some concern as she did not eat well and appeared uncomfortable in the hot weather. On a wet, muddy track, Farda Amiga was the 3.35/1 third choice in the betting behind You and the CCA Oaks winner Jilbab. The change of jockey made no difference in the tactics employed, as the filly started slowly before moving up on the outside approaching the stretch. She took the lead in the final strides and won by three-quarters of a length and two and three quarter lengths from the Delaware Oaks winner Allamerican Bertie and You. After the race, the winner was surrounded by celebrating connections who sang and chanted "Fly Farda Amiga". Lobo, struggling to make himself heard over the noise said "I think she proved today that she is the best 3-year-old filly in America. Almost 105 days without a race and to have a sickness after the Kentucky Oaks and she did very well. She's an amazing filly." McCarron said "She wasn't liking the stuff (mud) in her face, which is why I kept her out in the middle of the racetrack. I felt like when I put her to the task she was going to give me a punch. If that was going to be good enough to get the job done, we didn't know. But, she stepped up to the plate and got the job done for us".

Following another lengthy break, Farda Amiga was matched against older fillies and mares in the Breeders' Cup Distaff, run that year at Arlington Park on October 28. Ridden again by Day, she proved no match for the four-year-old Azeri (who won by five lengths), but proved the best of the three-year-olds, finishing second ahead of Imperial Gesture with Take Charge Lady in sixth. In November the filly was retired from racing. Lobo commented "Her owners made the decision. She has one physical problem, and they do not want to put a horse that is only 90 percent on the track... She is an amazing filly, and I think she deserves the title. She gave me a lot of thrills. She has such a big heart and made me well known. We will miss her a lot."

== Assessment and awards ==
In the Eclipse Awards for 2002, Farda Amiga was named American Champion Three-Year-Old Filly. She received 30 votes ahead of Imperial Gesture (7 votes), Take Charge Lady (6) and You (5).

== Breeding record ==
After her retirement from racing, Farda Amiga became a broodmare for her owners' breeding interests. Despite being consistently sent to leading stallions she has not been a success, producing one minor winner from six foals:

- Fardinha, a dark bay or brown filly, foaled in 2004, sired by Gone West, unraced
- Friendly Silk, dark bay or brown filly, 2005, by Gone West, failed to win in three races
- Fenomeno (USA), bay colt (later gelded), 2006, by Elusive Quality, failed to win in three races
- Lovingonyourmind, dark bay or brown mare, 2007, by Storm Cat, unraced
- Viva A Franca, dark bay or brown colt, 2008, by Storm Cat, unraced
- Smart Farda, bay colt, 2009, by Smart Strike, won minor race from ten starts

== Pedigree ==
Pedigree of Farda Amiga (USA), bay mare, 1999
Sire Broad Brush (USA) 1983	Ack Ack (USA); 1966	Battle Joined	Armageddon
Sire Broad Brush (USA) 1983	Ack Ack (USA); 1966	Battle Joined	Ethel Walker
Sire Broad Brush (USA) 1983	Ack Ack (USA); 1966	Fast Turn	Turn-To
Sire Broad Brush (USA) 1983	Ack Ack (USA); 1966	Fast Turn	Cherokee Rose
Sire Broad Brush (USA) 1983	Hay Patcher (USA); 1973	Hoist The Flag	Tom Rolfe
Sire Broad Brush (USA) 1983	Hay Patcher (USA); 1973	Hoist The Flag	Wavy Navy
Sire Broad Brush (USA) 1983	Hay Patcher (USA); 1973	Turn To Talent	Turn-To
Sire Broad Brush (USA) 1983	Hay Patcher (USA); 1973	Turn To Talent	Hidden Talent
Dam Fly North (USA) 1993	Pleasant Colony (USA); 1978	His Majesty	Ribot
Dam Fly North (USA) 1993	Pleasant Colony (USA); 1978	His Majesty	Flower Bowl
Dam Fly North (USA) 1993	Pleasant Colony (USA); 1978	Sun Colony	Sunrise Flight
Dam Fly North (USA) 1993	Pleasant Colony (USA); 1978	Sun Colony	Colonia
Dam Fly North (USA) 1993	Dry North (USA); 1985	Temperence Hill	Stop The Music
Dam Fly North (USA) 1993	Dry North (USA); 1985	Temperence Hill	Sister Shannon
Dam Fly North (USA) 1993	Dry North (USA); 1985	Northern Sunset	Northfields
Dam Fly North (USA) 1993	Dry North (USA); 1985	Northern Sunset	Moss Greine (Family 5-h)

- Farda Amiga was inbred 4 × 4 to Turn-To, meaning that this stallion appears twice in the fourth generation of her pedigree.
