= General George Stakes =

- Class: Listed
- Location: Laurel Park Racecourse, Laurel, Maryland, United States
- Inaugurated: 1973
- Race type: Thoroughbred – Flat racing
- Website: www.laurelpark.com

Race information
- Distance: 7 furlongs
- Surface: Dirt
- Track: left-handed
- Qualification: Four-years-old & up
- Weight: 124 lbs. with allowances
- Purse: US$250,000 (since 2013)

The General George Stakes is an American Thoroughbred horse race run annually on Presidents' Day in mid February at Laurel Park Racecourse in Laurel, Maryland. A Listed event, it is open to horses age three and older. Raced on dirt over a distance of seven furlongs, it currently offers a purse of $250,000. Originally run as a handicap, the race is currently run under allowance weight conditions.

The race is named for General George Washington (1731–1799), first president of The United States and Commanding General of the American Revolutionary Army. The General typically draws the third highest crowd of the year at Laurel Park Race Course, trailing only the Maryland Million and the Frank J. De Francis Memorial Dash Stakes in average attendance.

The race was held at Bowie Race Course from 1973–84 and at Pimlico Race Course in 1986. It was not held in 1979, 1982–83 or 2006. In 2006, the General George Handicap was not run due to concerns over an outbreak of the equine herpesvirus that shut down all racing in Maryland for several weeks.

In 2025 the event was downgraded by the Thoroughbred Owners and Breeders Association to Listed status.

== Records ==
Speed record:

- 7 furlongs – 1:20.95 – Greenspring (2010)
- 1 1/16 miles – 1:44.00 – Templar Hill (1987)

Most wins by a horse:

- No horse has ever won the General George Handicap more than once

Most wins by a jockey:

- 3 – Mike Luzzi (1991, 1999, 2012)

Most wins by a trainer:

- 2 – Bruce N. Levine (2008, 2015)
- 2 – Jerry Robb (1987 & 1989)

Most wins by an owner:

- 2 – Four Roses Thoroughbreds (1998 & 2007)

== Winners of the General George Stakes since 1973 ==
Yr	Winner	Age	Jockey	Trainer	Owner	Dist	Time	Purse	Gr
2023	Eastern Bay	9	William Humphrey	Norman Cash	Built Right Stables	7 F	1:23.29	$250,000	III
2022	Cordmaker	7	Victor Carrasco	Rodney Jenkins	Hillwood Stable LLC	7 F	1:23.82	$250,000	III
2021	Share the Ride	6	Victor Carrasco	Miguel Penaloza	Silvino Ramirez	7 fur	1:22.85	$250,000	III
2020	Firenze Fire	5	Irad Ortiz Jr.	Jason Servis	Mr. Amore Stable	7 fur	1:22.38	$250,000	III
2019	Uncontested	7	Trevor McCarthy	Jennifer Patterson	Robert V. LaPenta	7 fur	1:21.06	$250,000	III
2018	Something Awesome	7	Elvis Trujillo	Jose Corrales	Stronach Stables	7 fur	1:23.31	$250,000	III
2017	Imperial Hint	4	Julian Pimentel	Luis Carvajal, Jr.	Raymond Mamone	7 fur	1:21.20	$250,000	III
2016	Page McKenney	6	Horacio Karamanos	Mary E. Eppler	Jalin & Adam Staple	7 fur	1:24.61	$250,000	III
2015	Misconnect	4	Kendrick Carmouche	Bruce N. Levine	Repole Stable	7 fur	1:24.67	$250,000	III
2014	Bandbox	6	Xavier Perez	Rodney Jenkins	Hillwood Stable, LLC	7 fur	1:24.13	$250,000	II
2013	Javerre	4	J. D. Acosta	Cathal A. Lynch	Smith Farm & Stable	7 fur	1:23.81	$250,000	II
2012	Yawanna Twist	5	Mike Luzzi	Richard Dutrow Jr.	Steel Face Stables	7 fur	1:22.38	$200,000	II
2011	No Advantage	6	Manuel Chaves	Stephanie Beattie	Suarez Racing, Inc.	7 fur	1:24.46	$150,000	II
2010	Greenspring	5	Jeremy Rose	Christopher Grove	Our Chelsea Stable	7 fur	1:20.95	$150,000	II
2009	True Quality	4	Chuck Lopez	John P. Campo Jr.	Paraneck Stable	7 fur	1:22.31	$200,000	II
2008	Bustin Stones	4	Ramon Domínguez	Bruce N. Levine	Roddy Valente	7 fur	1:24.47	$200,000	II
2007	Silver Wagon	6	Edgar Prado	Anthony W. Dutrow	Four Roses T-breds	7 fur	1:23.13	$200,000	II
2006	no race	-	no race	no race	no race	7 fur	0:00.00	$250,000	III
2005	Saratoga County	4	Javier Castellano	George Weaver	Evelyn M. Pollard	7 fur	1:23.43	$200,000	II
2004	Well Fancied	6	Edgar Prado	Richard Dutrow	Sanford Goldfarb	7 fur	1:22.49	$200,000	II
2003	My Cousin Matt	4	Ramon Domínguez	Scott A. Lake	Richard A. Englander	7 fur	1:22.12	$200,000	II
2002	Wrangler	4	Aaron Gryder	James Jerkens	Frank Stronach	7 fur	1:22.53	$200,000	II
2001	Peeping Tom	4	Ariel Smith	Patrick Reynolds	Flatbird Stable	7 fur	1:22.00	$200,000	II
2000	Affirmed Success	6	Jorge F. Chavez	Richard Schosberg	Albert Fried Jr.	7 fur	1:22.02	$200,000	II
1999	Esteemed Friend	5	Mike Luzzi	Joseph Imperio	Chi Ki Liu & J. Imperio	7 fur	1:22.54	$200,000	II
1998	Royal Haven	6	Richard Migliore	Gasper Moschera	Four Roses T-breds	7 fur	1:23.04	$200,000	II
1997	Why Change	4	Mark Guidry	Joseph H. Pierce Jr.	Marvin Delfiner	7 fur	1:22.41	$200,000	II
1996	Moscow Monster	5	Rick Wilson	Benjamin Perkins Jr.	Not Found	7 fur	1:22.11	$200,000	II
1995	Who Wouldn't	6	Joe Rocco	Donald Barr	M. P. Higgins III	7 fur	1:22.08	$200,000	II
1994	Blushing Julian	4	Robert E. Colton	Allen Iwinski	Rosemont Farm, Inc.	7 fur	1:22.91	$200,000	II
1993	Majesty's Turn	4	Alberto Delgado	Luigi Gino	Calgary Stables, Ltd.	7 fur	1:22.66	$200,000	II
1992	Senior Speedy	5	Jorge F. Chavez	Alfredo Callejas	Robert Perez	7 fur	1:21.96	$200,000	II
1991	Star Touch	5	Mike Luzzi	Edmond D. Gaudet	Ted Sabarese	7 fur	1:22.90	$200,000	II
1990	King's Nest	5	Michael T. Hunter	Lawrence E. Murray	Sondra D. Bender	7 fur	1:22.00	$200,000	
1989	Little Bold John	7	Donnie A. Miller Jr.	Jerry Robb	Jack Owens	7 fur	1:22.80	$200,000	
1988	Private Terms	3	Kent Desormeaux	Charles Hadry	Stuart Janney Jr.	1 mile	1:38.80	$125,000	
1987	Templar Hill	3	Greg W. Hutton	Jerry Robb	Paul Seefeldt	1-1/16	1:44.00	$125,000	
1986	Broad Brush	3	Vincent Bracciale	Richard W. Small	Robert E. Meyerhoff	1-1/16	1:44.20	$90,622	
1985	Roo Art	3	Donnie A. Miller Jr.	D. Wayne Lukas	Barbara A. Holleran	1 mile	1:37.60	$89,539	
1984	Judge McGuire	3	Carlos H. Mendoza	Harold Rose	C. A. Cuprill	1-1/16	1:46.60	$92,572	
1983	no race	-	no race	no race	no race	7 fur	0:00.00	$250,000	
1982	no race	-	no race	no race	no race	7 fur	0:00.00	$250,000	
1981	Classic Go Go	3	Bryan Fann	Del W. Carroll	Verne Winchell	7 fur	1:23.20	$61,858	
1980	Galaxy Road	3	Greg McCarron	LeRoy Jolley	Herve Racivitch	7 fur	1:24.60	$61,100	
1979	no race	-	no race	no race	no race	7 fur	0:00.00	$250,000	
1978	Ten Ten	3	William Passmore	King T. Leatherbury	George Cobaugh	1-1/16	1:45.80	$30,333	
1977	Do the Bump	3	Chris McCarron	King T. Leatherbury	Archie Chase	1-1/16	1:47.20	$29,630	
1976	Princely Game	3	Anthony Agnello	Hubert Hine	Zelda Cohen	1-1/16	1:44.60	$29,900	
1975	Pendulum Sam	3	Luigi Gino	H. Stewart Mitchell	Kristos M. Kiriakow	1-1/16	1:48.20	$30,010	
1974	Sharp Gary	3	Carlos Barrera	Joseph DiAngelo	Edward R. Scharps	1-1/16	1:46.60	$31,900	
1973	Ecole Etage	3	George Cusimano	Bud Delp	Bon Etage Farm	1-1/16	1:44.60	$30,440	

== See also ==
- General George Handicap "top three finishers" and starters
