= William Passmore =

William Passmore may refer to:

- William Passmore (boxer) (1915–1986), South African boxer and Olympic competitor
- William J. Passmore (1933–2009), American jockey
- William L. Passmore (1910–2002), American jockey and Thoroughbred trainer
- William T. Passmore (1882–1955), American lacrosse player
- Will Passmore, EastEnders character
