= Jennings Handicap top three finishers =

List of horse race results

This is a listing of the horses that finished in either first, second, or third place and the number of starters in the Jennings Handicap, an American stakes race for horses three years old and older, at four different distances over the years (1-1/8 miles, 1-1/16 miles, 1 mile, and 6 furlongs), on the dirt at Laurel Park Racecourse in Laurel, Maryland. (List 1923–present)

Year	Winner	Second	Third	Starters
2022	Cordmaker	Hanalei's Houdini	Galerio	7
2021	Tattooed	Galerio	Cordmaker	9
2020	Alwaysmining	John Jones	Clubman	6
2018	Cordmaker	Rockinn on Bye	John Jones	8
2017	John Jones	Brigets Big Luvy	Rockinn on Bye	9
2016	John Jones	Rockinn on Bye	Kaitain	8
2015	Noteworthy Peach	Admirals War Chest	Any Court Inastorm	10
2014	Eighttofasttocatch	Larry Le Roi	Concealed Identity	9
2013	Eighttofasttocatch	Wild Louis	Concealed Identity	10
2012	Eighttofasttocatch	Hello Lover	Charge	10
2011	Eighttofasttocatch	Indian Dance	Concealed Identity	6
2010	No Race	No Race	No Race	0
2009	Regal Solo	Distributor	Sarto	n/a
2008	Broadway Producer	P V Lightening	Easy Red	n/a
2007	Digger	Evil Storm	Forty Crowns	n/a
2006	Easy Red	Tartlet	Due	n/a
2005	Cherokee's Boy	George's Gain	Water Cannon	n/a
2004	Aggadan	Irish Colony	New York Hero	n/a
2003	Pickupspeed	Acrolet	Polish Pride	n/a
2002	Include	Lightning Paces	First Amendment	n/a
2001	Include	Waited	Carney's Prospect	n/a
2000	Crosspatch	Greyhound	Main Quest	n/a
1999	Praise Heaven	Perfect to a Tee	Main Quest	n/a
1998	Testafly	Testing	Fireside Brass	n/a
1997	Mary's Buckaroo	Dr. Banning	Perfect to a Tee	n/a
1996	Say Capp	Bay Capp	Den of Thieves	n/a
1995	Tidal Surge	Ameri Valay	Mary's Buckaroo	n/a
1994	Taking Risks	Frottage	Tidal Surge	n/a
1993	Forry Cow How	Ameri Valay	Timely Warning	n/a
1992	Valley Crossing	Gala Spinaway	Baron de Vaux	n/a
1991	Reputed Testamony	Seven Salutes	Jet Stream	n/a
1990	Silano	Jet Stream	Flaming Emperor	n/a
1989	Little Bold John	Due North	Silano	n/a
1988	Little Bold John	Silano	Infirmative Action	n/a
1987	Little Bold John	Sparrowvon	Dancing Hic	n/a
1986	Little Bold John	Majestic Solo	Pat's Addition	n/a
1985	Count My Love	Owned by All	Epilogue	n/a
1984	A Magic Spray	Tim Tamber	Hush Hush Flash	n/a
1983	Kattegat's Pride	Eurodancer	A Magic Spray	n/a
1982	Tim Tamber	Denunciator	Haligoluk	n/a
1981	Gasp	Counter Punch	Advan	n/a
1980	Bold Josh	T. V. Hill	Chennault	n/a
1979	What a Gent	Dave's Friend	Take the Pledge	n/a
1978	Resound	Snappy Chatter	Nashver's Omega	n/a
1977 #	Resound	Jolly Johu	Gala Harry	n/a
1977 #	Splitting Headache	King of Fools	Federation	n/a
1976	Northerly	Winter Fox	Resound	n/a
1975 #	Sherby	On Your Toes	Jolly Johu	n/a
1975 #	Christopher R.	Walk Tall	Gala Double	n/a
1974	Northern Fling	Laplander	Royal J D	n/a
1973	North Sea	Lexington Park	Dundee Marmalade	n/a
1972	Amber Hawk	Rockem Back	Lead Me On	n/a
1971	Laplander	Sport King	Joe Frazier	n/a
1970	Berkley Prince	Peace Corps	Mister Diz	n/a
1969	Promise	Misty Cloud	A Latin Spin	n/a
1968	Rock Talk	Jim J.	Exceedingly	n/a
1967	Bonny Johnny	Gala Performance	Exceedingly	n/a
1966	Duc de Great	Solid Fuel	Bonny Johnny	n/a
1965	Air Spin	Solid Fuel	Repeating	n/a
1964	Bonny Johnny	Double Heritage	Repeating	n/a
1963	Half Breed	One Gallus	Bonny Johnny	n/a
1962	Nickel Boy	Ruffy	Towson Man	n/a
1959	1961 No Race	No Race	No Race	n/a
1958	Madok	Aurecolt	Nickel Boy	n/a
1949	1957 No Races	No Races	No Races	n/a
1948	Nathaniel	Little Harp	Pep Well	n/a
1947	Pep Well	Rippey	Kitchen Police	n/a
1946	New Moon	Brookfield	The Doge	n/a
1945	Director J. E.	Blue Wings	Sophocles	n/a
1944	Sollure	New Moon	Porter's Cap	n/a
1943	No Race	No Race	No Race	n/a
1942	Ocean Blue	Doublrab	Transfigure	n/a
1941	Handy Tom	Third Covey	Honey Cloud	n/a
1940	Battle Jack	Speed to Spare	Slow Motion	n/a
1939	Rough time	Sun Egret	Battle Jack	n/a
1938	Preeminent	Sun Egret	Black Look	n/a
1933	1937 No Race	No Race	No Race	n/a
1932	Sun Meadow	Happy Scot	Microphone	n/a
1931	Ladder	Happy Scot	R. V. Winkle	n/a
1930	Balko	Jock	The Heathen	n/a
1929	Bobashela	Stream Line	Crystal Domino	n/a
1928	Princess Tina	Canter	Sun Meddler	n/a
1927	Single Foot	Canter	Sen. Norris	n/a
1926	Noah	Dress Parade	Single Foot	n/a
1925	Wise Counsellor	Shuffle Along	Scorcher	n/a
1924	Shuffle Along	Big Blaze	Sunspero	n/a
1923	Dinna Care	Champlain	Hildur	n/a

A # indicates that the race was run in two divisions. This occurred in 1975 and 1977.

== See also ==
- Jennings Handicap
- Laurel Park Racecourse
