= General George Handicap top three finishers =

This is a list of horses that finished in first, second and third places, and the number of starters, in the General George Handicap, a Grade 2, seven-furlong American thoroughbred sprint race at Laurel Park Racecourse in Laurel, Maryland.

Year	Winner	Second	Third	Starters
2021	Share the Ride	Tattooed	Laki	9
2020	Firenze Fire	Threes Over Deuces	Still Having Fun	8
2019	Uncontested	Majestic Dunhill	Laki	14
2018	Something Awesome	Fellowship	It's the Journey	10
2017	Imperial Hint	Stallwalkin' Dude	Never Gone South	10
2016	Page McKinney	Majestic Affair	Sonny Inspired	9
2015	Misconnect	Cutty Shark	Souper Knight	12
2014	Bandbox	Tenango	Service for Ten	9
2013	Javerre	Il Villano	Broad Rule	6
2012	Yawanna Twist	This Ones for Phil	Toby's Corner	7
2011	No Advantage	Laysh Laysh Laysh	Heritage Hall	11
2010	Greenspring	Digger	Ah Day	7
2009	True Quality	Fabulous Strike	Malibu Kid	7
2008	Bustin Stones	Lord Snowdon	Premium Wine	8
2007	Silver Wagon	Ah Day	Ryan's for Real	9
2006	No Race	No Race	No Race	0
2005	Saratoga County	Don Six	Gators N Bears	9
2004	Well Fancied	Unforgettable Max	Gators N Bears	9
2003	My Cousin Matt	Peeping Tom	Disturbingthepeace	11
2002	Wrangler	Rusty Spur	Affirmed Success	8
2001	Peeping Tom	Delaware Township	Disco Rico	7
2000	Affirmed Success	Badge	Young At Heart	9
1999	Esteemed Friend	Star of Valor	Purple Passion	9
1998	Royal Haven	Purple Passion	Wire Me Collect	9
1997	Why Change	Appealing Skier	Le Grande Pos	10
1996	Meadow Monster	Splendid Sprinter	Can't Be Nimble	9
1995	Who Wouldn't	Storm Tower	Powis Castle	8
1994	Blushing Julian	Chief Desire	Who Wouldn't	12
1993	Majesty's Turn	Senor Speedy	Ameri Valay	7
1992	Senor Speedy	Sunny Sunrise	Formal Dinner	12
1991	Star Touch	Profit Key	Fire Plug	11
1990	King's Nest	Wind Splitter	Notation	12
1989	Little Bold John	Oraibi	Finder's Choice	13
1988	Private Terms	Dynaformer	Delightful Doctor	13
1987	Templar Hill	Hay Halo	Win Dusty Win	11
1986	Broad Brush	Fast Step	Swallow	7
1985	Roo Art	Joyful John	I Am the Game	8
1984	Judge McGuire	American Artist	S. S. Hot Sause	9
1983	No Race	No Race	No Race	0
1982	No Race	No Race	No Race	0
1981	Classic Go Go	Thirty Eight Paces	Aztec Crown	9
1980	Galaxy Road	Leader of the Pack	Ashanti Gold	7
1979	No race	No race	No race	0
1978	Ten Ten	Game Prince	Gala Forecast	8
1977	Do the Bump	John U to Berry	Steel Bandit	6
1976	Princely Game	On the Sly	Troll By	7
1975	Pendulum Sam	King of Fools	Broadway Reviewer	7
1974	Sharp Gary	Jolly Johu	Ground Breaker	10
1973	Ecole Etage	Big Red L.	Select Performance	9

In 2013, Brigand finished second, but was disqualified to 5th.

† designates an American Champion or Eclipse Award winner.

== See also ==
- General George Handicap
- Laurel Park Racecourse
