= Native Dancer Stakes =

- Class: Ungraded stakes
- Location: Laurel Park Racecourse, Laurel, Maryland, United States
- Inaugurated: 1966
- Race type: Thoroughbred - Flat racing
- Website: www.laurelpark.com

Race information
- Distance: 1 1/8 mile
- Surface: Dirt
- Track: left-handed
- Qualification: Three-years-old & up
- Weight: Assigned
- Purse: $100,000

The Native Dancer Stakes is an American Thoroughbred horse race run annually at Laurel Park Racecourse in Laurel, Maryland. Raced in early January, it is open to horses age three and older and is contested on dirt over a distance of 1 1/8 mile. Its current purse is $75,000.

From 1966 to 2002, the race was known as the Native Dancer Handicap. It has been run at four different distances; for the first eleven years (from 1966 to 1976), the race was run at 6 furlongs, from 1977 to 1984 and in 2005 it was raced at a distance of 1 3/16 miles; in 1985 and from 2006 through 2010 the race was contested at its present distance of 1 mile; and from 1986 through 2003, it was run at a distance of 1 3/8 miles. The race was originally run at Bowie Race Track from 1966 through 1984.

The race is named in honor of Alfred G. Vanderbilt's Native Dancer. Native Dancer was the huge gray son of two of thoroughbred's top racing horses of the decade in Polynesian and Geisha. He was named Horse of the Year as a two-year-old and then named a repeat winner as a four-year-old. He also won the titles of Champion 2-year-old, Champion 3-year-old and Champion older horse in three consecutive years. Native Dancer won 21 of 22 races and earned $785,240. His 18 stakes victories included the Preakness Stakes, the Belmont Stakes and the Travers Stakes. Native Dancer's only loss was in the Kentucky Derby. Following a trip in which he was bumped three times, he finished second, a head behind Dark Star.

Upon his retirement, Native Dancer entered into stud at Vanderbilt's Sagamore Farm in Glyndon, Maryland, where he remained until his death in 1967. He was buried at Sagamore and was the sire of 45 stakes winners including Raise a Native (grandsire to Mr. Prospector), Alydar, Natalma and Northern Dancer.

== Records ==
Speed record:

- 6 furlongs - 1:09.00 - Tap The Tree (1974)
- 1 mile - 1:34.80 - Throng (2008)
- 1 1/16 miles - 1:40.20 - Jims Third Bolero (2005)
- 1 1/8 miles - 1:48.40 - Gulf Reckoning (1996)

Most wins by an owner:

- 2 - Jack Owens (1986, 1987)

Most wins by a jockey:

- 3 - Edgar Prado (1991, 1992, 1995)
- 3 - Vincent Bracciale Jr. (1974, 1981, 1983)

Most wins by a trainer:

- 3 - Michael Trombetta (2006, 2013 & 2014)

== Winners of the Native Dancer Stakes since 1966 ==
| Year | Winner | Age | Jockey | Trainer | Owner | Distance (Miles) | Time | Purse |
|---|---|---|---|---|---|---|---|---|
| 2023 | Nimitz Class | 4 | Jevian Toledo | Bruce M. Kravets | Tom Coulter | 1 1/8 | 1:52.11 | $100,000 |
| 2022 | Rough Sea | 8 | Denis Araujo | Bruno Tessore | Proud Stable Inc | 1 1/8 | 1:51.76 | $100,000 |
| 2021 | No Race | | | | | | | |
| 2020 | Harpers First Ride | 4 | Angel Cruz | Claudio Gonzalez | GMP Stables LLC | 1 1/8 | 1:48.56 | $100,000 |
| 2019 | Someday Jones | 6 | Trevor McCarthy | John Servis | Main Line Racing Stable | 1 1/8 | 1:49.23 | $100,000 |
| 2018 | Afleet Willy | 5 | Jomar Torres | Claudio Gonzalez | B. B. Horses | 1 1/16 | 1:43.78 | $100,000 |
| 2017 | Page McKenney | 7 | Horacio Karamanos | Mary E. Eppler | Staple/Jalin Stable | 1 1/16 | 1:45.01 | $100,000 |
| 2016 | Page McKenney | 6 | Horacio Karamanos | Mary E. Eppler | Staple/Jalin Stable | 1 1/16 | 1:44.70 | $75,000 |
| 2015 | Elnaawi | 5 | Sheldon Russell | Kiaran McLaughlin | Shadwell Stable | 1 1/16 | 1:45.20 | $100,000 |
| 2014 | Bold Curlin | 4 | Victor R. Carrasco | Michael Trombetta | Harry & Tom Meyerhoff | 1 1/16 | 1:43.62 | $100,000 |
| 2013 | Private Tale | 5 | Sheldon Russell | Michael Trombetta | Three Diamonds Farm | 1 1/16 | 1:45.35 | $125,000 |
| 2012 | No Race | | | | | | | |
| 2011 | Laysh Laysh Laysh | 6 | Erick Rodriguez | Richard Dutrow Jr. | Vincent S. Scuderi | 1-mile | 1:37.45 | $75,000 |
| 2010 | Greenspring | 5 | Jeremy Rose | Chris Grove | Our Chelsea Stable | 1-mile | 1:38.18 | $70,000 |
| 2009 | Lord Snowdon | 6 | Jeremy Rose | Anthony W. Dutrow | Kaplan Racing | 1-mile | 1:38.11 | $75,000 |
| 2008 | Throng | 5 | Carlos H. Marquez Jr. | Todd A. Pletcher | Starlight Stable, LLC. | 1-mile | 1:34.80 | $80,000 |
| 2007 | Judith's Wild Rush | 6 | Julian Pimentel | Julian Calet | Harvey Tenenbaum | 1-mile | 1:36.40 | $75,000 |
| 2006 | Your Bluffing | 6 | Mario Pino | Michael Trombetta | R.D.M. Racing Stable | 1-mile | 1:40.20 | $75,000 |
| 2005 | Jim Thirds Bolero | 6 | Ryan Fogelsonger | Annette M. Eubanks | Rev. Mark L. Andrews | 1 1/16 | 1:40.20 | $75,000 |
| 2004 | No Race | | | | | | | |
| 2003 | P Day | 8 | Ryan Fogelsonger | Charles H. Hadry | Adam Russo | 1 1/8 | 1:50.00 | $75,000 |
| 2002 | Private Ryan | 5 | Harry Vega | Timothy Tullock Jr. | Edmund Gann | 1 1/8 | 1:49.00 | $50,000 |
| 2001 | Do I Ever | 6 | Harry Vega | Bessie S. Gruwell | John Morella | 1 1/8 | 1:52.20 | $55,000 |
| 2000 | Montana Dreamin' | - | Joe Rocco | Timothy F. Ritchey | Richard Reveley | 1 1/8 | 1:50.20 | $75,000 |
| 1999 | Waited | - | Alberto Delgado | Barbara M. Kees | Sherry Rudolph | 1 1/8 | 1:49.40 | $80,000 |
| 1998 | Big Rut | - | Larry Reynolds | Hamilton A. Smith | James W. Peters Jr. | 1 1/8 | 1:50.80 | $60,000 |
| 1997 | Mary's Buckaroo | - | Mario Verge | Mary Joanne Hughes | Jackson Bryer | 1 1/8 | 1:49.40 | $80,000 |
| 1996 | Gulf Reckoning | 5 | Carlos H. Marquez Jr. | Ben W. Perkins Jr. | Dr. Charles Staats | 1 1/8 | 1:48.40 | $55,000 |
| 1995 | Dixie Hero | - | Edgar Prado | Charles Peoples | Bayard Sharp | 1 1/8 | 1:51.40 | $90,000 |
| 1994 | No Race | | | | | | | |
| 1993 | Ameri Valay | - | Larry Reynolds | King T. Leatherbury | Elaine & Nick Bassford | 1 1/8 | 1:49.80 | $60,000 |
| 1992 | Valley Crossing | 4 | Edgar Prado | Richard W. Small | Robert Meyerhoff | 1 1/8 | 1:48.60 | $60,000 |
| 1991 | Jet Stream | 5 | Edgar Prado | John C. Mobberly | John C. Mobberly | 1 1/8 | 1:50.80 | $65,000 |
| 1990 | Flaming Emperor | - | Clarence Ladner | Kenny Cox | Hideaway Farms | 1 1/8 | 1:48.60 | $75,000 |
| 1989 | Learned Jake | - | Kent Desormeaux | Art Benjamin | Dick Vermillion | 1 1/8 | 1:48.60 | $60,000 |
| 1988 | Due North | - | Michael Hunter | Katy Voss | Peter McGill | 1 1/8 | 1:49.60 | $60,000 |
| 1987 | Little Bold John | 5 | Donnie Miller Jr. | Jerry Robb | Jack Owens | 1 1/8 | 1:51.60 | $80,000 |
| 1986 | Little Bold John | 4 | Paul A. Nicol Jr. | Jerry Robb | Jack Owens | 1 1/8 | 1:53.20 | $80,000 |
| 1985 | Kaye's Prince | 6 | Donnie Miller Jr. | Kenneth Sumida | Juiles C. | 1-mile | 1:36.60 | $65,000 |
| 1984 | Island Champ | - | Alberto Delgado | Hank Allen | James J. Devaney | 1 1/16 | 1:46.00 | $65,000 |
| 1983 | Hail Emperor | - | Vincent Bracciale Jr. | | | 1 1/16 | 1:46.00 | $65,000 |
| 1982# | Buc 'n Bronc | - | Mario Pino | | | 1 1/16 | 1:44.60 | $50,000 |
| 1982# | Decent Davey | - | Leroy Moyers | | | 1 1/16 | 1:43.60 | $50,000 |
| 1981 | Skippers Friend | - | Vincent Bracciale Jr. | Robert Beale | | 1 1/16 | 1:44.60 | $65,000 |
| 1980 | Pole Position | - | Gunnar Lindberg | Goody Goodman | | 1 1/16 | 1:45.20 | $65,000 |
| 1979 | Isella | - | Mark Drury | | | 1 1/16 | 1:45.60 | $65,000 |
| 1978# | Ripon | - | Kelly Castaneda | | | 1 1/16 | 1:45.60 | $45,500 |
| 1978# | Take the Pledge | - | Jack Kurtz | | | 1 1/16 | 1:45.40 | $45,500 |
| 1977 | Jolly Johu | - | Larry Moyers | | | 1 1/16 | 1:44.20 | $58,900 |
| 1976 | Christopher R. | - | William J. Passmore | Beverly Hacker | Art Rooney | 6 fur. | 1:10.60 | $30,000 |
| 1975 | Christopher R. | - | William J. Passmore | Beverly Hacker | Art Rooney | 6 fur. | 1:09.60 | $30,000 |
| 1974 | Tap the Tree | - | Vincent Bracciale Jr. | | | 6 fur. | 1:09.00 | $30,000 |
| 1973 | Joys Fella | - | C. Jimenez | | | 6 fur. | 1:10.60 | $31,000 |
| 1972 | Pro Bidder | - | George Cusimano | | | 6 fur. | 1:10.40 | $31,000 |
| 1971 | Jaikyl | - | Paul Kallai | | | 6 fur. | 1:10.40 | $30,000 |
| 1970 | Gaelic Dancer | - | Robert Nono | | | 6 fur. | 1:10.20 | $31,000 |
| 1969 | Illustrious | - | Dennis Petrucelli | | | 6 fur. | 1:09.20 | $30,000 |
| 1968 | Understudy | - | Frank Lovato | | | 6 fur. | 1:11.00 | $30,000 |
| 1967 | Sandoval | - | Dave Gorman | | | 6 fur. | 1:10.20 | $30,000 |
| 1966 | Hoist Bar | - | Ismael Valenzuela | | | 6 fur. | 1:10.40 | $30,650 |

A # designates that the race was run in two divisions in 1978 and 1982.

== See also ==
- Native Dancer Stakes top three finishers
- Laurel Park Racecourse
