= Jennings Handicap =

- Class: Restricted stakes
- Location: Laurel Park Racecourse, Laurel, Maryland, United States
- Inaugurated: 1923
- Race type: Thoroughbred - Flat racing
- Website: www.laurelpark.com

Race information
- Distance: 1 miles (8 furlongs)
- Surface: Dirt
- Track: left-handed
- Qualification: Three-years-old & up
- Weight: Assigned
- Purse: $75,000

The Jennings Handicap is an American Thoroughbred horse race run annually at Laurel Park Racecourse in Laurel, Maryland. Raced in December each year, it is open to horses age three and older that are registered Maryland-breds and is contested on dirt over a distance of 1 mile (8 furlongs).

Prior to 1993, the race alternated locations between Laurel Park and Pimlico Race Course in Baltimore. The race has been run at four different distances: 1 1/8 miles, 1 1/16 miles, 1 mile, and 6 furlongs.

The race was named in honor of William Jennings Sr. who was one of Maryland's all-time great horsemen. His Glengar Farm was located six miles from "Old Hilltop" (Pimlico Race Course) on Smith Avenue in Baltimore, Maryland. Jennings achieved national prominence in the late 19th century. Among his good horses was 1887 Preakness Stakes winner Dunboyne, whom he bred, owned and trained. His heritage continued through his grandson, U.S. Racing Hall of Fame trainer Henry S. Clark, regarded by many as the dean of Maryland horse trainers.

== Records ==
Speed record:

- 1 1/8 miles - 1:48.40 - Include (2001)
- 1 1/16 miles - 1:42.20 - Amber Hawk (1972)

Most wins by a horse:

- 4 - Eighttofasttocatch (2011, 2012, 2013, 2014)
- 3 - Little Bold John (1987, 1988 & 1989)

Most wins by a jockey:

- 5 - Donnie Miller Jr. (1983, 1986, 1987, 1988 & 1989)

Most wins by a trainer:

- 4 - Tim Keefe (2011, 2012, 2013, 2014)
- 3 - Jerry Robb (1987, 1988 & 1989)

== Winners of the Jennings Handicap since 1923 ==
Yr	Winner	Age	Jockey	Trainer	Owner	Dist. (Miles)	Time	Purse
2022	Cordmaker	6	Victor Carrasco	Rodney Jenkins	Hillwood Stable, LLC	1 mile	1:39.70	$100,000
2021	Tattooed	6	Angel Cruz	Timothy Keefe	Ken Holt & Palumbo Racing	1 mile	1:37.46	$100,000
2020	Alwaysmining	4	Julian Pimentel	Kelly Rubley	Runnymede Racing	1 mile	1:37.35	$100,000
2019	Alwaysmining	3	Julian Pimentel	Kelly Rubley	Runnymede Racing	1 mile	1:35.84	$100,000
2018	Cordmaker	4	Alex Citron	Rodney Jenkins	Hillwood Stable	1 mile	1:35.84	$75,000
2017	John Jones	6	Edgar Prado	Lacey Gaudet	Matthew Schera	1 mile	1:36.36	$75,000
2016	John Jones	5	Luis Garcia	Lacey Gaudet	Matthew Schera	1 mile	1:36.34	$75,000
2015	Noteworthy Peach	3	J. Toledo	Gary Capuano	Non Stop Stable	1 mile	1:37.20	$60,000
2014	Eighttofasttocatch	8	Forest Boyce	Tim Keefe	Sylvia Heft	1 mile	1:36.70	$125,000
2013	Eighttofasttocatch	7	Forest Boyce	Tim Keefe	Sylvia Heft	1 mile	1:36.76	$100,000
2012	Eighttofasttocatch	6	Sheldon Russell	Tim Keefe	Sylvia Heft	1 mile	1:36.86	$100,000
2011	Eighttofasttocatch	5	Sheldon Russell	Tim Keefe	Sylvia Heft	1 mile	1:35.76	$75,000
2010	No Race	-	No Race	No Race	No Race	no race	0:00.00	no race
2009	Regal Solo	4	Jeremy Rose	Damon Dilodovico	Alvin M. Lapidus	1 1/8	1:53.06	$75,000
2008	Broadway Producer	5	Dale Beckner	John Terranova	Sovereign Stable	1 1/16	1:43.73	$75,000
2007	Digger	3	Horacio Karamonos	Richard Dutrow Jr.	Robert A. Urrutia	1 1/8	1:51.40	$75,000
2006	Easy Red	4	Steve D. Hamilton	James W. Murphy	Dumbarton Farm	1 1/8	1:54.80	$75,000
2005	Cherokee's Boy	5	Travis Dunkelberger	Phillip Capuano	Dave Picarello	1 1/8	1:52.40	$75,000
2004	Aggadan	5	Ariel E. Smith	Richard Dutrow Jr.	Sanford Goldfarb	1 1/8	1:52.80	$100,000
2003	Pickupspeed	6	Ryan Fogelsonger	Lawrence E. Murray	Sondra D. Bender	1 1/8	1:52.00	$100,000
2002	Include	5	Mario Pino	Bud Delp	Brereton C. Jones	1 1/8	1:49.40	$100,000
2001	Include	4	Chris McCarron	Bud Delp	Brereton C. Jones	1 1/8	1:48.40	$100,000
2000	Crosspatch	6	Joe Rocco	Berkley W. Kern	Frank A. Bonsal Jr.	1 1/8	1:51.60	$100,000
1999	Praise Heaven	7	Travis Dunkelberger	Dale Capuano	Louis Jay Ulman	1 1/8	1:49.20	$100,000
1998	Testafly	4	Greg Hutton	Dale L. Mills	Nixon Asomani	1 1/8	1:49.20	$100,000
1997	Mary's Buckaroo	6	Mario Verge	Mary J. Hughes	Jackson Bryer	1 1/8	1:49.00	$100,000
1996	Say Capp	5	Larry Reynolds	Jeff C. Runco	Germania Farms	1 1/8	1:49.20	$100,000
1995	Tidal Surge	5	Jeff Carle	Timothy F. Ritchey	Buddy Cox	1 1/8	1:50.20	$100,000
1994	Taking Risks	4	Mark Johnston	King T. Leatherbury	Riley Mangum	1 1/8	1:49.40	$100,000
1993	Forry Cow How	5	Larry Reynolds	Ronald Cartwright	J.W.Y. "Duck" Martin	1 1/8	1:50.00	$100,000
1992	Valley Crossing	4	Edgar Prado	Richard W. Small	Rockin' River Ranch	1 1/8	1:49.20	$100,000
1991	Reputed Testamony	4	Andrea Seefeldt	Richard Hemmings	Denny Emerson	1 1/8	1:49.80	$100,000
1990	Silano	6	Edgar Prado	Dale Capuano	Constance Capuano	1 1/8	1:49.80	$100,000
1989	Little Bold John	7	Donnie Miller Jr.	Jerry Robb	Jack Owens	1 1/8	1:50.20	$100,000
1988	Little Bold John	6	Donnie Miller Jr.	Jerry Robb	Jack Owens	1 1/8	1:50.40	$100,000
1987	Little Bold John	5	Donnie Miller Jr.	Jerry Robb	Jack Owens	1 1/8	1:50.20	$81,250
1986	Majestic Solo	-	Donnie Miller Jr.	Robert L. Adams	Not Found	1 1/8	1:50.40	$62,300
1985	Count My Love	5	Chris Antley	Richard W. Delp	Quality Hill Stable	1 1/8	1:49.80	$62,000
1984	A Magic Spray	5	Alberto Delgado	Ted West	Adelaide Poore Bolte	1 1/8	1:49.20	$62,300
1983	Kattegat's Pride	4	Donnie Miller Jr.	Joe Devereaux	Stephen E. Quick	1 1/8	1:49.20	$62,300
1982	Tim Tamber	4	Leroy Moyers			1 1/8	1:49.80	$62,000
1981	Gasp	7	Phil Grove			1 1/8	1:49.40	$62,000
1980	Bold Josh	5	R. B. Gilbert			1 1/8	1:50.20	$62,000
1979	What a Gent	5	Earlie Fires	John C. Wozneski	A. J. Wozneski	1 1/8	1:50.60	$62,000
1978	Resound	5	Gregg McCarron			1 1/8	1:51.20	$48,750
1977	Resound	4	Johnny Adams	Judith H. Zouck	Judith H. Zouck	1 1/8	1:49.40	$48,750
1977	Splitting Headache	6	Herb Hinojosa			1 1/8	1:49.00	$48,750
1976	Northerly	4	Ron Turcotte	Pancho Martin	Sigmund Sommer	1 1/8	1:49.20	$62,000
1975	Christopher R.	4	William J. Passmore			1 1/8	1:52.20	$48,750
1975	Sherby	4	Chuck Baltazar			1 1/8	1:51.60	$48,750
1974	Northern Fling	4	Anthony Agnello			1 1/8	1:49.40	$60,000
1973	North Sea	4	Vincent Bracciale Jr.		Alfred G. Vanderbilt II	1 1/16	1:42.40	$35,250
1972	Amber Hawk	4	Barry Alberts	James P. Simpson	Richard S. Reynolds Jr.	1 1/16	1:42.20	$36,000
1971	Laplander	4	Joe Imparato		Buckingham Farm	1 1/16	1:44.40	$36,000
1970	Berkley Prince	4	John Giovanni			1 1/16	1:44.00	$36,000
1969	Promise	4	Bobby Ussery			1 1/16	1:43.20	$35,000
1968	Rock Talk	4	Chuck Baltazar		Mrs. Milton Erlanger	1 1/16	1:44.20	$28,000
1967	Bonny Johnny	-	Garth Patterson	James P. Simpson	Richard S. Reynolds Jr.	1 1/16	1:44.40	$28,000
1966	Duc de Great	-	Chuck Baltazar			1 1/8	1:52.00	$28,000
1965	Air Spun	-	Chuck Baltazar	Brook Price		1 1/16	1:46.20	$29,000
1964	Bonny Johnny	-	Danny French			1 1/16	1:46.40	$29,000
1963	Half Breed	-	Wayne Chambers			1 1/16	1:43.40	$29,000
1962	Nickel Boy	-	Ronnie Ferraro			1 1/16	1:48.00	$28,000
1959	1962	-	no races	no races	no races	no race	0:00.00	no race
1958	Madok	-	Steve Brooks			1 1/8	1:53.40	$12,000
1949	1957	-	no races	no races	no races	no race	0:00.00	no race
1948	Nathaniel	-	Arnold Kirkland			6 fur.	1:11.20	$10,000
1947	Pep Well	-	Albert Snider	Jimmy Jones	Calumet Farm	6 fur.	1:12.40	$10,000
1946	New Moon	-	John Gilbert			6 fur.	1:12.60	$10,000
1945	Director J. E.	-	Tommy Root			6 fur.	1:11.00	$10,000
1944	Sollure	-	Leonard Bowers			6 fur.	1:11.80	$10,000
1943	no race	-	no races	no races	no races	no race	0:00.00	no race
1942	Ocean Blue	-	Tommy Malley	John P. (Doc) Jones	Crispin Oglebay	6 fur.	1:10.80	$6,000
1941	Handy Tom	-	John Harrell			6 fur.	1:11.40	$6,000
1940	Battle Jack	-	Lucas Dupps			6 fur.	1:11.40	$6,000
1939	Rough Time	-	Hilton Dabson			6 fur.	1:12.00	$6,000
1938	Preeminent	-	Earl Steffen			6 fur.	1:11.80	$3,000
1933	1937	-	no races	no races	no races	no race	0:00.00	no race
1932	Sun Meadow	-	Danny McAuliffe			6 fur.	1:12.00	$5,000
1931	Ladder	-	Louis Schaefer			6 fur.	1:11.60	$5,000
1930	Balko	-	John Bejshak			6 fur.	1:11.80	$10,000
1929	Bobashela	-	Clyde Ponce			6 fur.	1:14.80	$9,500
1928	Princess Tina	-	Pete Goodwin			6 fur.	1:14.20	$9,500
1927	Single Foot	-	Louis Schaefer			6 fur.	1:14.20	$10,000
1926	Noah	-	Pete Walls			6 fur.	1:12.80	$10,000
1925	Wise Counsellor	-	Arthur Johnson			6 fur.	1:12.80	$9,500
1924	Shuffle Along	-	Fred J. Stevens			6 fur.	1:11.80	$9,000
1923	Dinna Care	-	Clarence Kummer			6 fur.	1:11.60	$8,000

== See also ==
- Jennings Handicap top three finishers
- Laurel Park Racecourse
