= Geisha Handicap top three finishers =

Horses that finished in Maryland horse race

This is a listing of the horses that finished in either first, second, or third place and the number of starters in the Geisha Handicap, a Restricted Maryland-bred thoroughbred Stakes Race on dirt at 1-1/16 miles (8.5 furlongs) at Pimlico Race Course in Baltimore, Maryland.

Year	Winner	Second	Third	Starters
2022	Kiss the Girl	Artful Splatter	Coconut Cake	7
2021	Gale	Kiss the Girl	Coconut Cake	6
2020	Artful Splatter			-
2019	(No race held)	(No race held)	(No race held)	-
2018	Victory Rally			-
2017	My Magician	Moon Virginia	Lucky in Malibu	9
2016	Rockin Jojo	Candida H	Wowwhatabrat	8
2015	Brenda's Way	Bazinga B.	Celtic Katie	6
2014	Celtic Katie	Brenda's Way	Steady N Love	6
2013	Access to Charlie	Monster Sleeping	Mystic Love	6
2012	Bold Affair	Catch a Thief	Plum	7
2011	Baltimore Belle	Loves Blush	Access to Charlie	7
2010	Fascinatin’ Rhythm	Blind Date	Love's Blush	5
2009	Princess Nyla	All Smiles	Church Bells	6
2008	Lexi Star	Spectacular Malibu	Come Far Away	7
2007	Lexi Star	Katie's Love	Scheing E Jet	n/a
2006	Sassy Love	Best to You	Katie's Love	n/a
2005	Prominade Girl	Take a Check	Dance Fee	n/a
2004	Silmaril	Pour It On	Chrusciki	n/a
2003	Cruise along	Shiny Sheet	Undercover	n/a
2002	Shiny Sheet	Winter Leaf	Stanza	n/a
2001	Shine Again	Unbridled Lady	Case of the Blues	n/a
2000	Unbridled Lady	Proud Owner	Tookin Down	n/a
1999	Truth and Nobility	Proud Run	Merengue	n/a
1998	Weather Vane	Termly	Salute and Run	n/a
1997	Churchbell Chimes	Power Play	Faster and Farther	n/a
1996	Urbane	Julie's Brilliance	Miss Slewpy	n/a
1995	Calipha	Churchbell Chimes	Hold On My Heart	n/a
1994	Stars Knockout	Broad Gains	Fleet Broad	n/a
1993	Green Darlin	Ritchie Trail	Silence Speaks	n/a
1992	Brilliant Brass	Boxwood	Crowned	n/a
1991	Capp the Power	McKilts	Miss Protege	n/a
1990	Thirty Eight Go Go	Double Bunctious	Sanhaedra	n/a
1989	Thirty Eight Go Go	Double Bunctious	Bless You	n/a
1988	Thirty Eight Go Go	Smart 'n Quick	Landaura	n/a
1987	Alden's Ambition	Ann's Bid	Bear Feet	n/a
1986	Owned by All	Scotch Heather	Martins Choice	n/a
1985	Owned by All	Outspoken	Hatched	n/a
1984	Any Spray	Owned by All	Gold Banner	n/a
1983	Kattegat's Pride	Hampton Beach	Storm Petrel	n/a
1982	Zveylana	Scherzo's Last	Lady Dean	n/a
1981	Weber City Miss	Jameela	Contrary Rose	n/a
1980	Jameela	Pro Supper	Nobulee	n/a
1979	Pearl Necklace	Kit's Double	Debby's Turn	n/a
1978	Lucky Penny	Hot Slippers	Glad Appeal	n/a
1977	Gala Lil	Alza	Coral Dawn	n/a
1976 #	Gala Lil	Precious Count	Alza	n/a
1976 #	Crackerfax	War Exchange	Sailingon	n/a
1975	Twixt	Crackerfax	Sailinon	n/a
1974	Twixt	Crooked Answer	Sarah Percy	n/a
1973	Alma North	Twixt	Euonymus	n/a

A # signifies that the race was run in two divisions in 1976.
