= 1952 Kentucky Derby =

Horse race

78th Kentucky Derby
- Kentucky Derby
- Grade I stakes race
- Location: Churchill Downs
- Date: May 3, 1952
- Winning horse: Hill Gail
- Jockey: Eddie Arcaro
- Trainer: Ben A. Jones
- Owner: Calumet Farm
- Surface: Dirt

The 1952 Kentucky Derby was the 78th running of the Kentucky Derby. The race took place on May 3, 1952.

== Full results ==
Finished	Post	Horse	Jockey	Trainer	Owner	Time / behind
1st	1	Hill Gail	Eddie Arcaro	Ben A. Jones	Calumet Farm	2:01.60
2nd	5	Sub Fleet	Steve Brooks	Jack C. Hodgins	Dixiana	
3rd	9	Blue Man	Conn McCreary	Woody Stephens	White Oak Stable	
4th	2C	Master Fiddle	Dave Gorman	Sol Rutchick	Myhelyn Stable	
5th	2	Count Flame	Bill Shoemaker	Sol Rutchick	Jack J. Amiel	
6th	11	Arroz	Raymond York	T. Wallace Dunn	Mrs. Gordon Guiberson	
7th	8	Happy Go Lucky	Anthony Ferraiuolo	Harold G. Bockman	Harold G. Bockman	
8th	10	Hannibal	William J. Passmore	William L. Passmore	Bayard Sharp	
9th	7	Cold Command	Gerald Porch	Sylvester Veitch	Cornelius Vanderbilt Whitney	
10th	6	Smoke Screen	John H. Adams	John W. Burton	Reverie Knoll Farm	
11th	4	Gushing Oil	Ted Atkinson	Joseph Jansen	Sam E. Wilson Jr.	
12th	3	Pintor	Henri Mora	Dion K. Kerr Jr.	Montpelier Stable	
13th	14	Shag Tails	John Nazareth	Loyd Gentry Jr.	Milton Shagrin	
14th	15	Eternal Moon	J. Raymond Layton	Daverne Emery	Emerald Hill	
15th	13	Brown Rambler	Douglas Dodson	Russell L. Mitchell	Mildred F. Underwood	
16th	12	Swoop	Kenneth Church	Otto C. Rasch Jr.	High Tide Stable	
