= Native Dancer Stakes top three finishers =

This is a listing of the horses that finished in either first, second, or third place and the number of starters in the Native Dancer Stakes (1966-present), an American Thoroughbred Stakes race at seven furlongs run on dirt at Laurel Park Racecourse in Laurel, Maryland.

Year	Winner	Second	Third	Starters
2020	Harpers First Ride	Forewarned	Cordmaker	7
2019	Someday Jones	Alwaysmining	Monongahela	7
2018	Afleet Willy	Bodhisattva	John Jones	7
2017	Page McKenney	Bodhisattva	Cosmic Destiny	8
2016	Page McKenney	Golden Glint	Warrioroftheroses	6
2015	Elnaawi	Turco Bravo	Cosmic Gold	10
2014	Bold Curlin	Indian Jones	Managed Account	9
2013	Private Tale	Javerre	Adirondack King	9
2012	No Race	No Race	No Race	0
2011	Laysh Laysh Laysh	No Advantage	Global Force	9
2010	Greenspring	Encaustic	Ah Day	10
2009	Lord Snowdon	Sharps Island	P V Lightening	7
2008	Throng	Judith's Wild Rush	Barracuda Boy	9
2007	Judith's Wild Rush	Your Bluffing	Easy Red	9
2006	Your Bluffing	Aggadan	Marina Minister	8
2005	Jim Thirds Bolero	Little Matth Man	Tidal Wave	6
2004	No Race	No Race	No Race	0
2003	P Day	Full Brush	Hay Getoutofmyway	7
2002	Private Ryan	P Day	Cowboy Magic	n/a
2001	Do I Ever	Ewer All Wet	Tibado	n/a
2000	Montana Dreamin	S W Clarence	Copy Cat	n/a
1999	Waited	Algar	Warrenpeace	n/a
1998	Big Rut	Dr. Banting	Algar	n/a
1997	Mary's Buckaroo	Western Echo	Devil's Honor	n/a
1996	Gulf Reckoning	Sunny Sunrise	Greatsilverfleet	n/a
1995	Dixie Hero'	Rugged Bugger	Super Memory	n/a
1994	No Race	No Race	No Race	0
1993	Ameri Valay	Baron de Vaux	Forry Cow How	n/a
1992	Valley Crossing	Gala Spinaway	Midas	n/a
1991	Jet Stream	Reputed Testamony	Temper Time	n/a
1990	Flaming Emperor	Baldski's Choice	Overnight Hero	n/a
1989	Learned Jake	Ten Keys	Due North	n/a
1988	Due North	Entertain	Ridge Review	n/a
1987	Little Bold John	Sparrowvon	Due North	n/a
1986	Little Bold John	Cywan	Sparrowvon	n/a
1985	Kaye's Prince	Computer's Choice	Never Cye	n/a
1984	Island Champ	Forceful Intent	Double Door Prize	n/a
1983	Hail Emperor	Appeal Approved	Boston Tea	n/a
1982 #	Buck 'n Bronc	Boston Tea	Luxuriant Man	n/a
1982 #	Decent Davey	Blackie Daw	Sunny Winters	n/a
1981	Skipper's Friend	Bankers Sun	Sunny Winters	n/a
1980	Pole Position	The Cool Virginian	Telly Hill	n/a
1979	Isella	T. V. Hill	Chati	n/a
1978 #	Ripon	Parnis	Snappy Chatter	n/a
1978 #	Take the Pledge	Resound	Do the Bump	n/a
1977	Jolly Johu	Ripon	Go Go Roger	n/a
1976	Christopher R.	North Call	Jimbosanda	n/a
1975	Christopher R.	Double Edge Sword	King of Cornish	n/a
1974	Tap the Tree	Dr. Hurt	Mo Bay	n/a
1973	Joys Fella	Lucky Lord	Tsunami	n/a
1972	Pro Bidder	Joys Fella	Tsunami	n/a
1971	Jaikyl	Bushido	Mister Diz	n/a
1970	Gaelic Dancer	Fleet Admiral	Bushido	n/a
1969	Illustrious	American Native	Sub Call	n/a
1968	Understudy	Decacean	Sub Call	n/a
1967	Sandoval	Hansom Harve	Sub Call	n/a
1966	Hoist Bar	Glassell B.	Davis II	n/a

A # designates that the race was run in two divisions in 1978 and 1982.

== See also ==
- Native Dancer Stakes
- Laurel Park Racecourse
