= Bowl of Flowers =

American-bred Thoroughbred racehorse

- Sire: Sailor
- Grandsire: Eight Thirty
- Dam: Flower Bowl
- Damsire: Alibhai
- Sex: Filly
- Foaled: 1958
- Country: United States
- Colour: Chestnut
- Breeder: Brookmeade Stud
- Owner: Brookmeade Stable
- Trainer: J. Elliott Burch
- Record: 16: 10-3-3
- Earnings: $398,504

Major wins
- National Stallion Stakes (filly division) (1960); Gardenia Stakes (1960); Frizette Stakes (1960); Spinster Stakes (1961); Acorn Stakes (1961); Coaching Club American Oaks (1961)

Awards
- U.S. Champion two-year-old filly (1960); U.S. Champion three-year-old filly (1961)

Honours
- United States' Racing Hall of Fame (2004)
- Last updated on March 10, 2007

Bowl of Flowers (foaled 1958 in Virginia) was an American Hall of Fame Thoroughbred Champion racehorse.

== Background ==
Bowl of Flowers was the product of two horses owned by Isabel Dodge Sloane. Bred at Ms Sloane's Brookmeade Stud in Upperville, Virginia, her sire was Sailor, winner of the 1955 Pimlico Special, and her dam was Flower Bowl, for whom the Flower Bowl Invitational Stakes at Belmont Park is named. Bowl of Flowers was a half-sister to the successful racehorses and sires Graustark and His Majesty (both by Ribot).

Racing under the banner of Ms Sloane's Brookmeade Stable, Bowl of Flowers was trained by Elliott Burch.

== Racing career ==
At age two, in her eight starts the filly won six races and finished second twice. Her performances earned her 1960 Champion Two-Year-Old Filly honors. At age three, she continued her winning ways, capturing two of the Triple Tiara of Thoroughbred Races and finishing second in the third. Once again, Bowl of Flowers' performances earned her the U.S. Champion three-year-old filly title.

== Retirement ==
While training at Hialeah Park Race Track in Florida for the 1962 racing season, Bowl of Flowers fractured a sesamoid bone and was retired. As a broodmare, she produced seven foals including the colt Spruce Bouquet (by Big Spruce), who won the 1981 Hawthorne Gold Cup Handicap, and the sire Whiskey Road (by Nijinsky), whose progeny included the 1981 Melbourne Cup winner Just A Dash and the international champion Strawberry Road.

== Honors ==
In 2004, Bowl of Flowers was inducted in the United States' National Museum of Racing and Hall of Fame.
