= John B. Campbell Handicap =

- Class: Ungraded stakes
- Location: Laurel Park Racecourse, Laurel, Maryland, United States
- Inaugurated: 1954
- Race type: Thoroughbred – Flat racing
- Website: www.laurelpark.com

Race information
- Distance: 1 1/8 miles (9 furlongs)
- Surface: Dirt
- Track: left-handed
- Qualification: Three-years-old & up
- Weight: Assigned
- Purse: $100,000

The John B. Campbell Handicap is an American thoroughbred horse race run annually at Laurel Park Racecourse, in Laurel, Maryland, United States. Run in mid-February, it is open to horses age three and older and is contested on dirt over a distance of 1 1/8 miles (9 furlongs). The purse is $100,000.

== Honoree and inaugural ==
The race was named for John Blanks Campbell, an internationally noted racing secretary and the handicapper who set the annual Experimental Free Handicap weights, who died at age 77 on July 7, 1954. The inaugural edition of the John B. Campbell race was run on December 4, 1954, as the John B. Campbell Memorial Handicap at Bowie Race Track.

After the inaugural running, the race was set for the spring of each year beginning in 1955. From 1986 until 2001, it was held at Pimlico Race Course, in Baltimore, and was raced at a distance of 1 3/16 miles.

In his book Legacies of the Turf, prominent racing historian Edward L. Bowen says that at one time the John B. Campbell Handicap was a race of national importance. During the mid-1950s and 1960s the race was won by outstanding horses such as Sailor, Dedicate, Mongo, and the great U.S. Racing Hall of Fame inductee, Kelso.

== Records ==
Speed record:

- 1 1/4 miles – 2:01.80 – Manzotti
- 1 1/16 miles – 1:40.00 – In Reality (1968)
- 1 1/8 miles – 1:47.35 – Redding Colliery (2010)

Most wins by an horse:

- 3 – Sunny Sunrise (1992, 1993 & 1996)

Most wins by a jockey:

- 3 – Rick Wilson (1993, 1998 & 1999)

Most wins by a trainer:

- 4 – Richard W. Small (1976, 1987, 1998, 2009)

== Winners of the John B. Campbell Handicap since 1962 ==
Yr	Winner	Age	Jockey	Trainer	Owner	Dist. (Miles)	Time	Purse	Gr
2022	Galerio	6	J. D. Acosta	John E. Salzman Jr.	Bird Mobberley & G.Griffin	1 1/16	1:43.67	$100,000	
2021	Bankit	5	Sheldon Russell	Steven M. Asmussen	Winchell Thoroughbreds LLC	1 1/16	1:42.07	$100,000	
2020	Alwaysmining	4	Julian Pimentel	Kelly Rubley	Runnymoore Racing	1 1/16	1:42.46	$100,000	
2019	Bonus Points	5	Feargal Lynch	Todd A. Pletcher	Three Diamonds Farm	1 1/8	1:48.93	$100,000	
2018	Afleet Willy	5	Jomar Torres	Claudio Gonzalez	B. B. Horses	1 1/8	1:50.58	$100,000	
2017	Bodhisattva	5	Carlos Quinones	Jose Corrales	Jose Corrales	1 1/8	1:50.78	$100,000	
2016	Kid Cruz	5	José Ortiz	Linda Rice	Vina Del Mar T-breds	1 1/8	1:52.40	$75,000	
2015	Page McKenney	5	Horacio Karamanos	Mary Eppler	Adam Staple, Jalin Stable	1 1/8	1:51.88	$100,000	
2014	Behemoth	5	Victor Santiago	Claudio Gonzalez	Michelle&Claudio Stable	1 1/8	1:51.59	$100,000	
2013	Concealed Identity	5	Trevor McCarthy	Linda Gaudet	L.Gaudet & M.Bailey	1 1/8	1:52.29	$125,000	
2012	Jimanator	6	Junior Alvarado	Michael Trombetta	3 Diamonds Farm	1 1/8	1:49.95	$100,000	
2011	Alma d'Oro	5	Cornelio Velásquez	Todd Pletcher	Bourque Goldstein	1 1/8	1:53.18	$75,000	
2010	Redding Colliery	4	Anna Napravnik	Kiaran McLaughlin	Mrs. Fitriani Hay	1 1/8	1:47.39	$70,000	
2009	Richard's Kid	4	Jenna Joubert	Richard W. Small	Fitzhugh LLC	1 1/8	1:50.01	$75,000	
2008	Nite Light	4	Mike Luzzi	Todd Pletcher	Edward P. Evans	1 1/8	1:50.33	$75,000	
2007	Future Fantasy	6	Winston Thompson	Leona McKanas	Andrew Perkins	1 1/8	1:53.74	$75,000	
2006	Your Bluffing	6	Mario Pino	Michael Trombetta	R.D.M. Racing Stable	1 1/8	1:51.30	$75,000	
2005	Coast Line	4	John Velazquez	Todd Pletcher	Overbrook Farm	1 1/8	1:50.09	$125,000	
2004	Ole Faunty	5	Mike Luzzi	W. Elliott Walden	T. Van Meter/D. Hend	1 1/8	1:49.05	$150,000	
2003	Tempest Fugit	6	Jose Caraballo	John Servis	Dennis A. Drazin	1 1/8	1:49.90	$75,000	
2002	Lyracist	6	Jeremy Rose	Michael P. Petro	Timothy Cunningham	1 1/8	1:50.10	$75,000	
2001	Do I Ever †	6	Harry Vega	Bessie S. Gruwell	John Morella	1 3/16	1:55.37	$100,000	
2000	Salty Note	5	Mario Pino	Alec Fehr	Bruno Schickedanz	1 3/16	1:56.45	$75,000	III
1999	Crosspatch	5	Rick Wilson	Berkley Kern	Frank A. Bonsal Jr.	1 3/16	1:56.67	$100,000	III
1998	Hot Brush	4	Rick Wilson	Richard W. Small	Robert Meyerhoff	1 3/16	1:56.00	$100,000	III
1997	Traffic Circle	5	Heberto Castillo	John C. Kimmel	Kimmel/Moelis	1 3/16	1:55.00	$100,000	III
1996	Sunny Sunrise	5	Jeff D. Carle	Grover G. Delp	Harry Meyerhoff	1 3/16	1:55.00	$100,000	III
1995	Ameri Valay	6	Mark T. Johnston	King T. Leatherbury	Elaine & Nick Bassford	1 3/16	1:54.60	$100,000	III
1994	Ameri Valay	5	Alberto Delgado	King T. Leatherbury	Elaine & Nick Bassford	1 3/16	1:56.20	$100,000	III
1993	Sunny Sunrise	5	Rick Wilson	Grover G. Delp	Harry Meyerhoff	1 1/8	1:49.80	$100,000	III
1992	Sunny Sunrise	4	Mike Smith	Grover G. Delp	Harry Meyerhoff	1 1/8	1:49.20	$100,000	III
1991	J.R.'s Horizon	5	Calixto Juarez	W. Meredith Bailes	Marvin Champion	1 1/8	1:50.20	$125,000	III
1990	Jet Stream	4	Donnie A. Miller	W. Meredith Bailes	John Mobberley	1 1/8	1:50.80	$150,000	III
1989	Little Bold John	5	Donnie A. Miller	Jerry Robb	Jack Owens	1 1/8	1:49.20	$150,000	III
1988	Manzotti	5	Eddie Maple	Michael Stidham	Stuart Janney	1 1/4	2:01.80	$80,000	III
1987	Broad Brush	5	Vincent Bracciale	Richard W. Small	Robert E. Meyerhoff	1 1/4	2:05.60	$170,000	III
1986	Skip Trial	4	Jean-Luc Samyn	Sonny Hine	Ben Cohen	1 1/4	2:03.20	$175,000	III
1985	Imp Society	4	Pat Day	D. Wayne Lukas	Heslop Stable	1 1/4	2:03.00	$190,000	III
1984	Island Champ	4	Alberto Delgado	Hank Allen	James J. Devaney	1 1/4	2:04.40	$182,500	II
1983	Recusant	5	Jorge Velásquez	Mike Ball	Fred W. Hooper	1 1/4	2:05.60	$155,000	II
1982	Majesty's World	7	Anthony Black	John Tammaro Jr.	John D. Marsh	1 1/4	2:03.40	$152,750	II
1981	Relaxing	5	Ángel Cordero Jr.	Angel Penna	Carl Lizza	1 1/4	2:04.60	$152,500	II
1980	Pole Position	4	Gunnar Lindberg	Goody Goodman	Edward DeBartolo	1 1/4	2:05.40	$121,000	II
1979	Mister Brea	5	Ruben Hernandez	Floreano Fernandez	Cayetana Diaz	1 1/4	2:04.60	$100,000	II
1978	Ripon	5	Kelly Casteneda	Jonathan Sheppard	Augustin Stable	1 1/4	2:05.00	$122,000	II
1977	No Race	-	No Race	No Race	No Race	no race	0:00.00	no race	II
1976	Festive Mood	7	Herberto Hinojosa	Richard W. Small	Sally M. Gibson	1 1/4	2:05.40	$125,000	II
1975	Jolly Johu	7	Ben Feliciano	Robert L. Adams	Thomas N. Nichols	1 1/4	2:05.20	$125,000	II
1974	True Knight	5	Ángel Cordero Jr.	Lou Rondinello	Darby Dan Farm	1 1/4	2:05.40	$125,000	II
1973 *	Delay	5	Javier Canessa	Morris H. Dixon	William C. Wright	1 1/16	1:43.60	$100,000	III
1973 *	Vertee	4	John Ruane	H. Allen Jerkens	Hobeau Farm	1 1/16	1:42.80	$100,000	III
1972 *	Favorecidian	5	William Passmore	J. Woods Garth	Hickory Tree Stable	1 1/16	1:46.80	$100,000	
1972 *	Boone the Great	4	Anthony Agnello	John P. Campo	Al-Jo Stable	1 1/16	1:48.00	$100,000	
1971	Bushido	5	Eldon Nelson	Heather Buchanan	Susan B. Fisher	1 1/16	1:44.60	$125,000	
1970 *	Best Turn	5	Chuck Baltazar	Frank A. Bonsal	Calumet Farm	1 1/16	1:43.60	$66,500	
1970 *	Mitey Prince	5	Paul Kallai	William H. Dixon	Baird C. Brittingham	1 1/16	1:43.00	$66,500	
1969	Juvenile John	4	John Giovanni	Donald C. Bradley	John A. Hersberger	1 1/16	1:43.00	$125,000	
1968	In Reality	4	Chuck Baltazar	Melvin C. Calvert	Frances A. Genter	1 1/16	1:42.00	$125,000	
1967	Quinta	4	Steve Brooks	Bernard P. Bond	R. D. Bokum & D. W. Scott	1 1/16	1:43.60	$125,000	
1966	Tosmah	5	Sam Boulmetis Sr.	Joseph W. Mergler	Briardale Farms	1 1/16	1:44.40	$125,000	
1965	Lt. Stevens	4	Tommy Barrow	Charles P. Sanborn	Ernest Woods	1 1/16	1:46.20	$125,000	
1964	Mongo	5	John L. Rotz	Frank A. Bonsal	Marion duPont Scott	1 1/16	1:44.80	$120,000	
1963	Kelso	7	Ismael Valenzuela	Carl Hanford	Bohemia Stable	1 1/16	1:43.00	$120,000	

* † In 2001, Top Official won but was disqualified to third.
A * designates that the race was run in two divisions in 1972 and 1973.

== Earlier winners ==
- 1962 – Yorktown (Jimmy Nichols)
- 1961 – Conestoga (Roy L. Gilbert)
- 1960 – Yes You Will (Larry Adams)
- 1959 – Vertex (Sam Boulmetis Sr.)
- 1958 – Promised Land (Ismael Valenzuela)
- 1957 – Dedicate (William Boland)
- 1956 – Sailor (Bill Hartack)
- 1955 – Social Outcast (Eric Guerin)
- 1954 – Joe Jones (Conn McCreary)

== See also ==
- John B. Campbell Handicap top three finishers
