= Fisherman (American horse) =

American-bred Thoroughbred racehorse

- Sire: Phalanx
- Grandsire: Pilate
- Dam: Crawfish
- Damsire: Halcyon
- Sex: Stallion
- Foaled: 1951
- Country: United States
- Colour: Brown
- Breeder: Cornelius Vanderbilt Whitney
- Owner: Cornelius Vanderbilt Whitney
- Trainer: Sylvester Veitch
- Record: 45: 13-12-4
- Earnings: $436,050

Major wins
- Champagne Stakes (1953); Cowdin Stakes (1953); East View Stakes (1953); Great American Stakes (1953); American Legion Handicap (1954); Gotham Stakes (1954); Lawrence Realization (1954); Travers Stakes (1954); Washington, D.C. International Stakes (1954); Excelsior Handicap (1955); John B. Campbell Handicap (1955)

Fisherman (foaled 1951 in Kentucky) was an American Thoroughbred racehorse.

== Background ==
Fisherman was bred and raced by Cornelius Vanderbilt Whitney, a member of the prominent horse-racing Whitney family. He was out of the mare Crawfish and sired by Whitney's Phalanx, the winner of the 1947 Belmont Stakes voted American Champion Three-Year-Old Male Horse.

Fisherman was trained by future U.S. Racing Hall of Fame inductee, Sylvester Veitch.

== Racing career ==
Sent to the racetrack at age two, Fisherman won a number of races for his age group including the important Champagne Stakes. Despite Fisherman's performances in 1953, in the balloting for American Champion Two-Year-Old Colt he finished behind Hasty Road in one major poll and Porterhouse in the other two.

In 1954, under regular jockey Hedley Woodhouse, three-year-old Fisherman won the Gotham Stakes. In the U.S. Triple Crown series he finished seventh in the Kentucky Derby and did not run in the Preakness Stakes. But, in the ensuing Belmont Stakes he ran second to High Gun. From there, Fisherman went on to win two very important races. First, he won the Travers Stakes at Saratoga Race Course then, following the withdrawal of an injured High Gun, C. V. Whitney was invited to run Fisherman in the November Washington, D.C. International Stakes. In the mile and a half weight-for-age race on the grass at Laurel Park Racecourse in Laurel, Maryland, he was up against older horses and some of the best from Europe including Queen Elizabeth's colt Landau and the betting favorite, the French filly, Banassa. Ridden by Eddie Arcaro, Fisherman remained within striking distance of the pacesetter before taking the lead and holding off a charge in the homestretch by Banassa to win the race.

In 1955, Fishermen continued to win New York races, capturing the Excelsior Handicap and earning a second in the John B. Campbell Handicap. Encouraged by the performance on grass by Fisherman and another of his top runners, the three-year-old Career Boy, C. V. Whitney decided to send the two horses to compete in the 1956 Prix de l'Arc de Triomphe at Longchamp Racecourse in Paris, France. Fisherman finished off the board with Career Boy taking fourth behind winner, Ribot, one of the best horses in European racing history.

== Stud record ==
Fisherman was retired to stud but met with limited success as a breeding stallion.
