= Flower Bowl (horse) =

American-bred Thoroughbred racehorse

- Sire: Alibhai
- Grandsire: Hyperion
- Dam: Flower Bed
- Damsire: Beau Pere
- Sex: Filly
- Foaled: 1952
- Country: United States
- Colour: Bay
- Breeder: Brookmeade Stable
- Owner: Brookmeade Stable
- Trainer: Preston M. Burch
- Record: 32: 7-4-3
- Earnings: US$174,625

Major wins
- Delaware Handicap (1956); Ladies Handicap (1956)

Honours
- Flower Bowl Invitational Stakes at Belmont Park

Flower Bowl (1952–1968) was an American Thoroughbred racehorse and an outstanding broodmare. Bred and raced by Isabel Dodge Sloane's Brookmeade Stable, she was out of the mare Flower Bed and sired by the unraced British stallion Alibhai, who became a significant sire in the United States of other good runners such as 1954 Kentucky Derby winner Determine, the 1958 American Champion Older Female Horse Bornastar, as well as Your Host and Traffic Judge, among others.

Conditioned for racing by U.S. Racing Hall of Fame trainer Preston Burch, Flower Bowl was an excellent runner at longer distances. She notably won the then richest race for female horses, the 1¼ mile Delaware Handicap, in June and then October's 1½ mile Ladies Handicap at Belmont Park.

== Breeding record ==
Flower Bowl was retired to broodmare duty at Darby Dan Farm in the spring of 1957. Her top foals were:

- Bowl of Flowers (b. 1958) by Sailor - U.S. Racing Hall of Fame inductee who was the 1960 American Champion Two-Year-Old Filly and the 1961 American Champion Three-Year-Old Filly;
- Graustark (b. 1963) by Ribot - outstanding runner whose career was cut short by injury. 1985 Leading broodmare sire in Great Britain & Ireland;
- His Majesty (b. 1968) by Ribot - Graded stakes winner and the Leading sire in North America in 1982.

On the morning of 18 April 1968, one day after giving birth to His Majesty, Flower Bowl began hemorrhaging and died after efforts to save her proved futile. She is buried in the Darby Dan Farm equine cemetery. The Grade 1 Flower Bowl Invitational Stakes at Belmont Park is named in her honor.
