= Calipha =

American-bred Thoroughbred racehorse

- Sire: Two Punch
- Grandsire: Mr. Prospector
- Dam: Rajputana
- Damsire: Raja Baba
- Sex: Mare
- Foaled: 1991
- Country: United States
- Colour: Gray
- Breeder: Nancy Bayard
- Owner: Nancy Bayard
- Trainer: Bud Delp
- Record: 19: 8-0-2
- Earnings: $378,739

Major wins
- Black-Eyed Susan Stakes (1994); Geisha Handicap (1995); Caesar's Wish Stakes (1994); Reeve Schley, Jr. Stakes (1994)
- Last updated on July 3, 2011

Calipha (foaled in 1991 in Maryland) is an American Thoroughbred racehorse. The daughter of Two Punch is best remembered for posting a two-length score over the favorite, Bunting, in the mile and an eighth Grade II $200,000 Black-Eyed Susan Stakes at Pimlico Race Course on May 20, 1994.

== Black-Eyed Susan Stakes ==
Mid-May was a successful time of year for Calipha's owner, Nancy Bayard, and eventual Hall of Fame trainer, Bud Delp, who ran the filly in the de facto second jewel of the filly Triple Crown in the Grade II $200,000 Black-Eyed Susan Stakes. In that race, the Maryland-bred Calipha beat a near-capacity field of 13 stakes winners. The gray filly did this in wire-to-wire fashion as she broke well and established the lead running into the clubhouse turn. She won over favorite Bunting and Golden Braids, who finished second and third respectively. Her final time for the mile and one eighth race on dirt was 1:51.12 under Maryland jockey Rick Wilson.

== Racing career ==
Calipha also won the inaugural running of the Caesar's Wish Stakes at Pimlico Race Course in April 1994, beating Dance a Go Go and Simoom over the mile and a sixteenth. Later in the summer of 1994, Calipha won the Reeve Schley, Jr. Stakes at Monmouth Park, New Jersey beating her Black-Eyed Susan rival Golden Braids. In 1995, she won the $100,000 Geisha Handicap under jockey Kent Desormeaux. She won the 1-1/16 mile feature race at Laurel Park Racecourse in 1:50.00 flat. In May 1995, Calipha raced on the Preakness Stakes undercard and came in second in the grade two Allaire duPont Distaff Stakes.
