= Pearl Necklace (horse) =

American-bred Thoroughbred racehorse

- Sire: Ambernash
- Grandsire: Nashua
- Dam: Another Jane
- Damsire: Traffic Judge
- Sex: Mare
- Foaled: 1974
- Country: United States
- Colour: Chestnut
- Breeder: Reginald N. Webster
- Owner: Reginald N. Webster
- Trainer: Roger Laurin
- Record: 48: 21-11-6
- Earnings: US$737,862

Major wins
- Tempted Stakes (1976); Gazelle Handicap (1977); Long Island Handicap (1977); Maskette Handicap (1978); New York Handicap (1978); Flower Bowl Handicap (1979); Geisha Handicap (1979); Shuvee Handicap (1979); Hempstead Handicap (1979); Diana Handicap (1979)

Pearl Necklace (1974–1991) was an American Thoroughbred racing mare bred and raced by Reginald N. Webster. She was sired by Ambernash, a son of U.S. Racing Hall of Fame inductee, Nashua, and her dam was Another Jane, a daughter of Traffic Judge, a top runner whose wins included the Woodward Stakes and the Metropolitan and Suburban Handicaps.

== Racing career ==
Trained by Roger Laurin, Pearl Necklace raced for four years from 1976 through 1979. At age three she won the Long Island Handicap and Gazelle Handicap and at four the important Maskette Stakes and the New York Handicap but had her best year at age five when she captured the Flower Bowl, Geisha, Shuvee, Hempstead, and Diana Handicaps.

== Broodmare ==
Pearl Necklace was bred to several top horses such as Alydar, His Majesty, Lyphard and Conquistador Cielo, among others. However, none met with racing success.
