= Riggs Handicap =

American Thoroughbred horse race

- Class: Discontinued
- Location: Pimlico Race Course; Baltimore, Maryland, USA
- Inaugurated: 1926 - 2000
- Race type: Thoroughbred - Flat racing

Race information
- Distance: 1 1/2 miles (12 furlongs)
- Surface: Turf
- Track: left-handed
- Qualification: Three-year-olds and up

The Riggs Handicap is a discontinued American Thoroughbred horse race at the Pimlico Race Course in Baltimore, Maryland which was first run in 1926 as a race for horses age three and older and named in honor of the late William P. Riggs, Secretary of the Maryland Jockey Club.

The Riggs Handicap was run on dirt until 1949 when it was placed on hiatus. It was revived in 1956 as a race on turf. The race had its final running in 2000. Following the introduction of the Graded stakes system in the United States, the Riggs would be a Grade III event from 1973 through 1992.

Among the Riggs winners are Buck's Boy (1998); Little Bold John (1987, 1988), who won it twice on the turf; and Ecole Etage (1975). On dirt, the race attracted top runners such as Pilaster (1949), Stymie (1945), Polynesian (1946), Double Jay, (1947), Seabiscuit (1937) in track record time, Crusader (1926) and Bostonian (1927) won it on dirt.
