= Best Turn =

American thoroughbred racehorse

- Sire: Turn-to
- Grandsire: Royal Charger
- Dam: Sweet Clementine
- Damsire: Swaps
- Sex: Stallion
- Foaled: May 7, 1966
- Died: February 10, 1984
- Country: USA
- Color: Dark bay or brown
- Breeder: Calumet Farm
- Owner: Calumet Farm
- Record: 28: 15-5-2
- Earnings: $270,339

Major wins
- Saranac Handicap (1969) John B. Campbell Handicap (1970); Queens County Handicap (1970); Vosburgh Handicap (1970) Paumonok Handicap (1970)

Awards
- DRF 1969 American 3yo Males Free Handicap: 115 lbs DRF 1970 American Older Males Free Handicap: 122 lbs

Best Turn (May 7, 1966–February 10, 1984) was an American-bred thoroughbred racehorse and Classic Chef-de-race sire.

== Background ==
Best Turn was a dark bay or brown stallion bred and owned by the famous Calumet Farm.

Best Turn's sire, Turn-to, was a high-class racehorse, despite an abbreviated career on the track in which he won the Garden State Stakes, Saratoga Special, and Flamingo Stakes. He became a noted sire.

Best Turn was the first of his dam Sweet Clementine's four foals, and the most successful on the racetrack. Sweet Clementine had won one of her six starts for Calumet. Her dam and Best Turn's second dam was Miz Clementine, who won multiple stakes races and was a full sister to champion racer Two Lea.

Best Turn was very large (up to 17.3 hands). He was sickle-hocked behind and pigeon-toed in front. Due to his large size, he had difficulty in close quarters and ran best when able to get an open track on the outside.

== Racing career ==
Best Turn was a decent racehorse, although he wasn't of the highest class. As a three-year-old, he won the Saranac Handicap at Belmont Park and ran second in the Patriot Stakes.

Best Turn's best year was a four-year-old, during which he turned in a campaign that included wins in the John B. Campbell Handicap, Vosburgh Handicap, Paumonok Handicap, and Queens County Handicap as well as a second-place finish in the Carter Handicap.

Best Turn's four-year-old season concluded with three consecutive wins, in which he won the Vosburgh Handicap on October 24 and Queens County Handicap on November 14, with an additional allowance race win in between. He came from behind in the Queens County Handicap, running in tenth place a half-mile into the race and moving up to third at the head of the stretch. In winning the Queens County Handicap, Best Turn injured a foot, leading to his retirement from racing.

== Stud career ==
Best Turn retired to stand stud at Calumet Farm, where he enjoyed considerable success as a sire, peaking at ninth on the American sire list in 1979. He sired 346 foals, including 35 black-type winners (10.1%). His AEI was 2.81. As a broodmare sire, he sired 136 dams of 890 foals, including 33 black-type winners (3.7%), with an AEI of 1.28.

Best Turn also was a successful sport horse sire.

Best Turn died in February, 1984. He was euthanized due to complications from foot surgery. Best Turn was buried at Calumet Farm, along with his dam, Sweet Clementine.

By 2015, Best Turn's sire line was effectively extinct.

Best Turn was named a Classic Chef-de-race in the Roman-Miller dosage system.

=== Notable progeny ===
- Cox's Ridge, winner of the Metropolitan Handicap, Suburban Handicap, and Excelsior Handicap; noted sire
- Davona Dale, winner of the New York Triple Tiara, Kentucky Oaks, Fantasy Stakes, etc.; Hall of Fame member

== Pedigree ==
Pedigree of Best Turn (USA), dark bay or brown stallion, foaled 1966
Sire Turn-to (IRE) 1951	Royal Charger (GB); 1942	Nearco (ITY)	Pharos (GB)
Sire Turn-to (IRE) 1951	Royal Charger (GB); 1942	Nearco (ITY)	Nogara (ITY)
Sire Turn-to (IRE) 1951	Royal Charger (GB); 1942	Sun Princess (GB)	Solario (IRE)
Sire Turn-to (IRE) 1951	Royal Charger (GB); 1942	Sun Princess (GB)	Mumtaz Begum (GB)
Sire Turn-to (IRE) 1951	Source Sucree (FR); 1940	Admiral Drake (FR)	Craig an Eran (GB)
Sire Turn-to (IRE) 1951	Source Sucree (FR); 1940	Admiral Drake (FR)	Plucky Liege (GB)
Sire Turn-to (IRE) 1951	Source Sucree (FR); 1940	Lavendula (FR)	Pharos (GB)
Sire Turn-to (IRE) 1951	Source Sucree (FR); 1940	Lavendula (FR)	Sweet Lavender (GB)
Dam Sweet Clementine (USA) 1960	Swaps (USA); 1952	Khaled (GB)	Hyperion (GB)
Dam Sweet Clementine (USA) 1960	Swaps (USA); 1952	Khaled (GB)	Eclair (GB)
Dam Sweet Clementine (USA) 1960	Swaps (USA); 1952	Iron Reward (USA)	Beau Pere (GB)
Dam Sweet Clementine (USA) 1960	Swaps (USA); 1952	Iron Reward (USA)	Iron Maiden (USA)
Dam Sweet Clementine (USA) 1960	Miz Clementine (USA); 1951	Bull Lea (USA)	Bull Dog (FR)
Dam Sweet Clementine (USA) 1960	Miz Clementine (USA); 1951	Bull Lea (USA)	Rose Leaves (USA)
Dam Sweet Clementine (USA) 1960	Miz Clementine (USA); 1951	Two Bob (USA)	The Porter (USA)
Dam Sweet Clementine (USA) 1960	Miz Clementine (USA); 1951	Two Bob (USA)	Blessings (USA)

Best Turn is inbred 4S × 4D to Pharos, meaning Pharos appears in the fourth generation on both the sire and dam's side of the pedigree. Gun Runner is also inbred to Plucky Liege 4S × 5D and Gainsborough 5S × 5D.
