= Donald Miller Jr. =

American jockey

Personal information
- Full name: Donald Andrew Miller Jr.
- Nickname: Donnie
- Nationality: American
- Born: 11 June 1963 (age 63) Laurel, Maryland
- Occupation: Jockey

Horse racing career
- Sport: Horse racing
- Career winnings: US$37,000,000+
- Career wins: 2,856

Major racing wins
- Distaff Handicap (1982); Barbara Fritchie Handicap (1982, 1984, 1985); Longfellow Handicap (1982); Long Look Handicap (1982); Sapling Stakes (1983); Gallorette Handicap (1984); Monmouth Handicap (1984); Woodlawn Stakes (1985, 1988); Anne Arundel Handicap (1985); Chrysanthemum Handicap (1986); Betsy Ross Handicap (1987); Riggs Handicap (1987, 1988); Hempstead Handicap (1987); Baltimore Budweiser Breeders' Cup Handicap (1988); John B. Campbell Handicap (1989, 1990); Ak-Sar-Ben Oaks (1992) American Classics: Preakness Stakes (1983)

Significant horses
- Deputed Testamony

Donald "Donnie" Andrew Miller Jr. (born June 11, 1963) is a retired thoroughbred horse racing jockey who competed from the 1980s to mid 1990s. Miller started racing in the early 1980s and had the most wins as an apprentice jockey in 1981. As a jockey, Miller won twenty three graded stakes races from 1982 to 1992. Of his wins, Miller won the 1983 Preakness Stakes with Deputed Testamony as part of the Triple Crown of Thoroughbred Racing.

In Grade I races, Miller won the 1983 Sapling Stakes, 1984 Monmouth Handicap and the 1987 Hempstead Handicap. Apart from winning the 1982 Long Look Handicap as his sole Grade II win, Miller won the Barbara Fritchie Handicap four times during his eighteen wins as a Grade III racer. After retiring from horse racing in September 1996, Miller had received over US$37 million in prize winnings and had 2,856 race wins. After ending his horse racing career, Miller became a real estate agent. In 2012, The Baltimore Sun named Miller as one of the top 125 athletes of Maryland.

== Early life ==
On June 11, 1963, Miller was born outside of Laurel, Maryland. His father, Donnie Miller worked in horse racing as a trainer. Miller started his experience with horses at the age of five and became a thoroughbred rider at the age of fourteen. While growing up with a hearing disability, Miller became partially deaf in one ear and fully deaf in the other ear by the age of sixteen. When he was nineteen, Miller had already moved from Laurel to Jessup, Maryland and Columbia, Maryland.

== Career ==
=== Apprentice jockey ===
In September 1980, Miller began his horse racing career in Laurel. As an apprentice jockey, Miller won his first race in November 1980. In 1981, Miller appeared in his first graded stakes races held as Grade III handicaps. His best performance in graded races that year was a second-place finish at the Marylander Handicap.

During a fall at Laurel in late November 1981, Miller experienced loss of consciousness while also injuring his shoulder and neck. A few days later, Miller resumed his racing career in early December 1981 following his accident. With 296 wins, Miller was the highest ranked apprentice jockey in 1981 and fourth overall of all jockeys.

=== Journeyman jockey and later career ===
On December 16, 1981, Miller became a journeyman jockey. By the end of 1981, Miller had received three separate suspensions during his racing career. In the overall rankings for all jockeys in 1982, Miller finished the year in third place.

Between 1982 and 1992, Miller won eighteen Grade III races, one Grade II race and four Grade I races. For his Grade III wins, Miller won the Barbara Fritchie Handicap four times, including both of the races held in the 1984 edition. Other Grade III wins that Miller won more than once were the Woodlawn Stakes, Riggs Handicap and John B. Campbell Handicap. In Grade II races, Miller won the 1982 Long Look Handicap with Lady Dean.

As a Grade I racer, Miller's first win was with Smart n Slick at the 1983 Sapling Stakes. He also won the 1984 Monmouth Handicap with Believe the Queen and the 1987 Hempstead Handicap with Catatonic. At Triple Crown of Thoroughbred Racing events, Miller won the 1983 Preakness Stakes with Deputed Testamony. Miller rode the horse as Billy Boniface's third backup after Herb McCauley decided to ride Parfaitement instead of Deputed Testamony. At the next three editions of the Preakness editions, Miller's highest finish was fourth in 1985. In other events, Miller was sixth at the 1983 Belmont Stakes and eleventh at the 1989 Kentucky Derby. At the 1989 Breeders' Cup Mile, Miller finished in tenth place.

Throughout his career, Miller primarily raced in Maryland while also competing in Kentucky, Arkansas and Delaware. During the early to mid 1980s, Miller had the most wins in multiple seasons at Pimlico Race Course. In June 1996, Miller lost all of his hearing in a horse racing accident. After his hearing was partially restored, Miller retired in September 1996 to prevent himself from "[losing his] hearing for good". Overall, Miller received over $37 million of prize winnings and had 2,856 race wins. Of his wins, Miller was a five time Jennings Handicap winner and rode Little Bold John during 21 wins in stakes races.

After ending his horse racing career in 1996, Miller started working in real estate. From the late 1990s to 2010s, Miller was a real estate agent. During this time period, Miller started a website in 1999 about jockeys.

== Awards and honors ==
In 2012, Miller was named one of the top 175 athletes of Maryland by The Baltimore Sun.
