= Sailor II =

American-bred Thoroughbred racehorse

Sailor
- Sire: Eight Thirty
- Grandsire: Pilate
- Dam: Flota
- Damsire: Jack High
- Sex: Stallion
- Foaled: 1952
- Country: United States
- Colour: Chestnut
- Breeder: Brookmeade Stable
- Owner: Isabel Dodge Sloane
- Trainer: Preston M. Burch
- Record: 21: 12-3-1
- Earnings: $321,075

Major wins
- Pimlico Special (1955); Roamer Handicap (1955); Toboggan Handicap (1955); Fall Highweight Handicap (1955); Gulfstream Park Handicap (1956); John B. Campbell Handicap (1956)

Sailor (foaled 1952 in Kentucky) was an American Thoroughbred racehorse. Bred and raced by heiress Isabel Dodge Sloane's Brookmeade Stable, he was out of the Brookmeade mare Flota and sired by U.S. Racing Hall of Fame inductee Eight Thirty.

Sailor was conditioned for racing by Hall of Fame trainer Preston Burch. As a three-year-old in 1955, the colt did not run in any of the U.S. Triple Crown races. However, under regular rider Hedley Woodhouse he won four major races that year, including the prestigious Pimlico Special at Pimlico Race Course in Baltimore. At age four, he began the year competing in Florida, where he won the Gulfstream Park Handicap, then back at Pimlico Race Course he captured the John B. Campbell Handicap, at the time a race of national importance.

== As a sire ==
Retired to stud duty at Darby Dan Farm in Lexington, Kentucky, Sailor sired a number of stakes winners, notably the outstanding Hall of Fame filly Bowl of Flowers, Travers Stakes winner Crewman, and 1964 American Champion Sprint Horse Ahoy.
