= William L. Passmore =

American jockey, trainer and horse racing (1910–2002)

Personal information
- Born: Manhasset, New York
- Occupations: Jockey, Horse trainer

Horse racing career
- Sport: Horse racing

William L. Passmore (March 19, 1910 – November 7, 2002) was a jockey and trainer in both flat and steeplechase Thoroughbred horse racing. He rode horses professionally from the late 1920s until about 1946 when he took up training.

During his career he conditioned horses for prominent owners such as John Sanford, Deborah Rood, Morris Dixon and Bayard Sharp. As a trainer, among his important flat racing wins was the 1948 Monmouth Handicap. In 1952 he trained the colt Hannibal for Sharp with whom he finished eighth in the Kentucky Derby.

Passmore retired in 1963. He was inducted into the Delaware Sports Museum and Hall of Fame in 1992. He died in 2002 at age 92 near Seaford, Delaware. His son, William J. Passmore, had a successful career as a jockey and has served as a steward at racetracks in Maryland. Daughter Patricia Passmore married Eclipse Award winning jockey, Darrel McHargue.
