= Concern (horse) =

American-bred Thoroughbred racehorse

- Sire: Broad Brush
- Grandsire: Ack Ack
- Dam: Fara's Team
- Damsire: Tunerup
- Sex: Stallion
- Foaled: 1991
- Country: United States
- Colour: Bay
- Breeder: Robert E. Meyerhoff
- Owner: Robert E. Meyerhoff
- Trainer: Richard W. Small
- Record: 30: 7-7-11
- Earnings: $3,079,350

Major wins
- Arkansas Derby (1994); Californian Stakes (1995); New Orleans Handicap (1995) Breeders' Cup wins: Breeders' Cup Classic (1994)

Honors
- Fair Grounds Racing Hall of Fame (2004)

Concern (February 14, 1991 – March 26, 2015) was a multi-millionaire American Thoroughbred racehorse. He was sired by top stallion Broad Brush, who in turn was a son of Ack Ack. His dam was Fara's Team. Foaled in Maryland, Concern was best known for his wins in the 1994 Breeders' Cup Classic and the grade two Arkansas Derby. Born at owner Robert Meyerhoff's Fitzhugh Farm in Phoenix, Maryland. To date, Concern is one of only four Maryland-bred horses ever to surpass the three million dollar mark in earnings. The other three were Cigar, Knicks Go and Awad. He finished racing with a record of 7–7–11 in 30 starts and career earnings of $3,079,350.

== Two-year-old season ==
At age two, Concern developed late in the year. He raced a total of four times winning both a maiden special weight race in his second attempt and an allowance race. He placed third in the $60,000 Rollicking Stakes for 2-year-old Maryland-breds at Laurel Park Racecourse.

== Three-year-old season ==
Concern established himself as one of his crop's top three-year-olds by winning two big races and finishing in the money in each of his twelve starts as a sophomore. He started the season with three stakes placings in the spring at Oaklawn Park in Arkansas. In each successive stakes, he improved, beginning with a third-place finish in the Great West Stakes. He followed that up with a runner-up finish under jockey Francine Villeneuve in the grade three Rebel Stakes to Judge T. C. In April, Concern scored the second-biggest win of his career under Garrett Gomez in the $500,000 Grade II Arkansas Derby. He ran the 1-1/8 mile distance in 1:48.1 in a field of nine, defeating Blumin Affair and Silver Goblin.

His connections then bypassed the Kentucky Derby in favor of the hometown $750,000 Grade I Preakness Stakes at Pimlico Race Course. In the second leg of the Triple Crown, Concern was taken back early, trailing by 15 lengths down the backstretch. Then he unleashed his late rush and made up about a dozen lengths, finishing third behind Tabasco Cat and Derby winner Go for Gin.

After his Preakness placing, Concern wheeled back in three weeks to place third in the Grade III Round Table Stakes at Arlington Park. Two weeks later, he raced in the $300,000 grade two Ohio Derby and finished second in the field of nine to Exclusive Praline. He then finished third in the $500,000 Haskell Invitational to Holy Bull. Later that summer, he attempted to run down Holy Bull again in the $750,000 grade one Travers Stakes at Saratoga Race Course. He finished second by a neck but came in ahead of dual Classic winner Tabasco Cat.

In the autumn of 1994, he shipped to Canada to race in the nine furlong Grade II Molson Export Million Stakes, placing third to Dramatic Gold. Two weeks later, he lost narrowly to Soul of the Matter in the $750,000 grade one Super Derby.

Concern rallied from last to first, beating Tabasco Cat and Dramatic Gold, in the 1994 Breeders' Cup Classic.

== Four-year-old season ==
At age four, Concern won the $200,000 grade two New Orleans Handicap in March at Fair Grounds Race Course. Mike Smith piloted him to the win over Fly Cry and Tossofthecoin. In the summer of 1995, he won the $275,000 grade one Californian Stakes at Hollywood Park, beating Tossofthecoin and Tinners Way. He also placed third in three grade one races: the Pimlico Special Handicap to Cigar, the Oaklawn Handicap to Cigar again, and the Meadowlands Cup to Peaks and Valleys. After finishing eighth to Cigar in the muddy Breeder's Cup Classic at Belmont Park, Concern returned to the Fair Grounds Race Course, where he had begun the year with a win in the New Orleans Handicap, to win an allowance on November 24, 1995, two days after Thanksgiving, in his career finale.

== Retirement ==
A descendant of the great sire Nearco, Concern was retired to stud in 1996 at Northview Stallion Station in Chesapeake City, Maryland until 2003. He then moved to the Oklahoma Equine Reproductive Center in Washington, Oklahoma, where he stood from 2004 until being pensioned in 2011. While Concern has sired a number of winners, his offspring have had some success in graded stakes races but never to the level that their sire accomplished. The best of his progeny has actually been Good Night Shirt, a steeplechase runner who was voted the 2007 and 2008 Eclipse Award as American Champion Steeplechase Horse and was elected to the National Museum of Racing and Hall of Fame in 2017.

A press release on March 26, 2015, announced Concern's death at the age of 24. He was buried at Oklahoma Equine.

== Pedigree ==
Pedigree of Concern, bay colt, February 14, 1991
| Sire Broad Brush | Ack Ack | Battle Joined | Armageddon |
| Sire Broad Brush | Ack Ack | Battle Joined | Ethel Walker |
| Sire Broad Brush | Ack Ack | Fast Turn | Turn-to* |
| Sire Broad Brush | Ack Ack | Fast Turn | Cherokee Rose |
| Sire Broad Brush | Hay Patcher | Hoist The Flag | Tom Rolfe |
| Sire Broad Brush | Hay Patcher | Hoist The Flag | Wavy Navy |
| Sire Broad Brush | Hay Patcher | Turn to Talent | Turn-to* |
| Sire Broad Brush | Hay Patcher | Turn to Talent | Hidden Talent |
| Dam Fara's Team | Tunerup | The Pruner | Herbager |
| Dam Fara's Team | Tunerup | The Pruner | Punctilious |
| Dam Fara's Team | Tunerup | Our Girl | Rocky Royale |
| Dam Fara's Team | Tunerup | Our Girl | Nell Girl |
| Dam Fara's Team | Specialization | Princely Native | Raise a Native |
| Dam Fara's Team | Specialization | Princely Native | Charlo |
| Dam Fara's Team | Specialization | Special Vintage | Specialmante |
| Dam Fara's Team | Specialization | Special Vintage | Dark Duet (family: A5) |

* Concern is inbred 4S x 4S to the stallion Turn-To, meaning that he appears fourth generation twicw on the sire side of his pedigree.
