= Include (horse) =

American-bred Thoroughbred racehorse

- Sire: Broad Brush
- Grandsire: Ack Ack
- Dam: Illeria
- Damsire: Stop The Music
- Sex: Stallion
- Foaled: 1997
- Country: United States
- Colour: Bay
- Breeder: Robert E. Meyerhoff
- Owner: Robert E. Meyerhoff
- Trainer: Bud Delp
- Record: 20: 10-1-4
- Earnings: US$1,659,560

Major wins
- Whirlaway Handicap (2001); Pimlico Special Handicap(2002); New Orleans Handicap (2001); Massachusetts Handicap (2001); Vincent A. Moscarelli Memorial Stakes (2001); Jennings Handicap (2001, 2002)

Honours
- Maryland Horse Of The Year (2001); Maryland Champion Older Male (2002); Champion Sire in Argentina (2015)

Include (foaled in 1997) is a millionaire American Thoroughbred racehorse and successful sire. Bred in Maryland by Robert E. Meyerhoff and raced under the Fitzhugh LLC banner as his owner, he had a record of 20: 10-1-4 with career earnings of $1,659,560. Include was best known for his wins in the G1 Pimlico Special, the G2 New Orleans Handicap, and the G2 Massachusetts Handicap. His trainer Bud Delp considered him second only to Spectacular Bid among the horses he had trained, and jockey Mario Pino called him one of the best horses he'd ever ridden. Include is 16.1 hands high.

During the last two years of his career, he earned 13 triple-digit Beyer speed figures in his final 15 starts, among which were back-to-back speed figures of 117.

== Two-year-old season ==
Include was a slow-developing colt early in his career and raced only two times as a two-year-old, finishing out of the money once and finishing third in his second start for annual earnings of $4,280. These were the only starts made under his first trainer Small Richard W.

== Three-year-old season ==
At age three, Include won his first start by 9 1/2 lengths, a seven furlong maiden special weight at Laurel Park Racecourse. He followed the win up with wins in an allowance and an allowance optional claiming in the summer in his home state of Maryland, both contested at Laurel Park. The first was a nine furlong dirt race that he won by three lengths, and the second was an eight and half furlong race that he won by 8 1/4 lengths over a field of multiple winners. Include also won the $100,000 Vincent A. Moscarelli Memorial Stakes at nine furlongs at Delaware Park by 9 1/2 lengths, defeating Judge's Case and Lightning Paces. The four straight wins with an average margin of 7 1/2 lengths earned him favoritism in the G3 Pennsylvania Derby against graded stakes winners Hal's Hope and Pine Bluff amongst others. He ran wide and finished sixth, pulling a muscle while running on the sloppy track. Include finished his sophomore season with a record of four wins in five starts and annual earnings of $92,880.

== Four-year-old season ==
2001 was the best year of Include's career, culminating in his being named Maryland's Champion Older Male and Horse Of The Year. As a four-year-old, he finished in the money in eight of nine races. His first race was the $125,000 Whirlaway Handicap now renamed the Mineshaft Stakes over eight and a half furlongs at Fair Grounds Race Course, which he won by two lengths. Include spent the next three weeks breezing and doing two mile gallops in preparation for this next start in the G2 New Orleans Handicap, a race he won by 1 1/4 lengths, beating well-regarded horses such as Nite Dreamer and Arkansas Derby winner Valhol. After his New Orleans success, he shipped north to Baltimore, Maryland and scored a 3 1/4 length win in the $100,000 Jennings Handicap, a nine furlong race on dirt at Pimlico Race Course restricted to Maryland-bred horses. After his Jennings score, his connections decided to take a step up in class and compete in the G1 Pimlico Special Handicap. Bred and trained in Maryland, Include was the local favorite for the race, and the overall 5/2 co-second choice on the morning line in a field of seven graded stakes horses from around the country, including G3 Widener Handicap winner Albert the Great, G1 Gulfstream Park Handicap placed Pleasant Breeze, and Milwaukee Brew, winner of the prior year's G2 Ohio Derby. He broke slowly but made up ground before the first turn and placed himself third rounding the track. He made a move at the top of the stretch, going through a narrow opening between horses to win the nine and a half furlong race in 1:55.61, despite drifting out in the stretch.

Include's next race was the $500,000 G2 Massachusetts Handicap at Suffolk Downs just outside Boston, Massachusetts, with other entries including three time G1 winner Sir Bear and G3 Ben Ali Stakes winner Broken Vow. He was the morning line favorite for the nine furlong race and assigned a weight of 118 pounds, being by then considered one of the top older horses in the country. When the weather turned rainy before the race, trainer Bud Delp almost scratched Include due to his poor performance in a similarly water-logged Pennsylvania Derby the year prior, but after jockey Jerry Bailey confirmed that the track was safe and that the inner track had stabilized, decided to remain in the race. By the time the race started, Include was the second choice behind Broken Vow. Include won easily by four lengths in a time of 1:48.61. He recorded a Rogozin figure of 1 in the race.

In his next race, he ran in the G2 Suburban Handicap at Belmont Park against a field considered small but talented. Include finished third to wire-to-wire winner Albert the Great and the Chilean horse Lido Palace. Include irritated a splint bone during the race, resulting in a three-month break before he raced again. At the end of the summer, Include placed third in the $500,000 G2 Meadowlands Cup, losing to Gander and Broken Vow by a neck in a "tremendous stretch battle." Include ran in the G1 Breeders' Cup Classic, but failed to produce a notable run, finishing seventh. In the late autumn, as his last race of the year, Include entered the $450,000 G2 Clark Handicap at Churchill Downs as the morning line favorite and highweight at 120 pounds, in which he was once again matched up against Gander. Include finished second by a neck to Ubiquity, who set a stakes record of 1:48 1/5.

Include ended his four-year-old season with a record of 9: 5-1-2 and annual earnings of $1,435,400. He was the unanimous selection as Maryland Champion Older Male and Horse of the Year.

== Five-year-old season ==
In Include's first race at age five, he recorded a repeat victory in the Jennings Handicap, winning by nine lengths as the favorite in 1:49.97 for the nine furlongs. The race ended up being his last win. Include was the morning line favorite and highweight for the G2 Massachusetts Handicap. He was in the lead coming into the final stretch, but was passed by Evening Attire and eventual winner Macho Uno to finish third, beaten by two lengths. Due to a cough, it was eleven weeks until Include raced again, in the G2 Phillip H. Iselin Handicap, once again assigned the top weight at 120 pounds the 1-2 favorite, but he bobbled at the start and was clearly not in a position to win in the final stretch, finishing sixth in the seven horse field. It later turned out that Include had, for the first time, displaced his soft palate during the race. Due to the soft palate displacement, Include's noseband was changed to a figure-eight noseband for the G2 Meadowlands Cup in what ended up being his final race. Racing wide around the final turn, Include ended up finishing fifth.

Include's final record at age five was 4: 1-0-1 and annual earnings of $127,000.

== Retirement and stud career ==
Include was retired to Airdrie Stud in 2003 at an initial fee of $12,500. As a son of Broad Brush out of a mare by Stop the Music, he was an outcross sire for Northern Dancer and Mr. Prospector blood with three crosses to Turn-to in his first four generations. Include was considered to be the last good chance for the Domino sire line to continue. As a sire, Include was noted for passing on a consistent look to his foals. In the sales ring, Include's first few crops included multiple sales toppers, and his stud fee was doubled in 2007 to $25,000. By the end of 2007, Include was considered a promising sire from two crops of racing age, including G1 winners Cash Included and Panty Raid among five other stakes winners. His stud fee was increased to $35,000 for 2008. After his initial success, Include's next three crops were all absent of any stakes winners, and his stud fee began to decrease: to $17,500 in 2009, $10,000 in 2010, and $7,500 in 2011. Include's following crops contained multiple stakes winners, including G1 Prioress Stakes winner Her Smile and G1 Kentucky Oaks runner-up St. John's River, resulting in an increase in Include's stud fee to $12,500 in 2013. In 2015, his stud fee was decreased back down to $10,000, where it stayed until 2018 when it was lowered to $7,500, where it remained for the rest of his stud career in North America.

He shuttled to Haras La Biznaga in 2009, 2010, and 2011 and to Haras La Providencia in 2013, both in Argentina, eventually resulting in him being named the 2015 Champion Sire in Argentina. After the 2021 breeding season, Include was pensioned, although he still has a fee listed for 2022.

Other notable progeny include G1 Gran Premio Latinoamericano winner Don Inc, Canadian champion Riker, Argentinian champions Sobradora Inc and Sociologa Inc, and multiple G1 winner Include Me Out. Include's son Redeemed was the leading first-, second-, and third-crop sire in the Midatlantic region.
