= Little Bold John =

American-bred Thoroughbred racehorse

- Sire: John Alden
- Grandsire: Speak John
- Dam: Little Bold Sphinx
- Damsire: Bold Ambition
- Sex: Gelding
- Foaled: January 19, 1982; Weston Farm, Upper Marlboro, Maryland
- Died: January 21, 2003 (aged 21); Weston Farm, Upper Marlboro, Maryland
- Country: United States
- Colour: Dark Brown
- Breeder: Hal C.B. Clagett
- Owner: 1) Hidden Hill Farm; 2) Jack Owens
- Trainer: Jerry Robb
- Record: 105: 38-16-14
- Earnings: US$$2,056,406

Major wins
- Jennings Handicap (1986, 1987 ,1988, 1989); Donn Handicap(1987); General George Handicap (1989); Maryland Million Classic (1987); John B. Campbell Handicap (1987); Native Dancer Handicap (1987, 1988); Riggs Handicap (1987, 1988)

Honours
- Maryland Thoroughbred Hall of Fame (2015)

Little Bold John (1982–2003) was an American Thoroughbred racehorse.

== Background ==
He was bred in Maryland by Hal C.B. Clagett and raced under the Hidden Hill Farm's banner as his owner. He finished racing with a record of 38-16-14 in 105 starts with career earnings of $2,056,406. Little Bold John was best known for his wins in the grade one Donn Handicap and the grade two General George Handicap.

In 1997, he became the first Maryland-bred horse to accumulate $1 million in career earnings, and he remains only one of six horses to have multimillion-dollar earnings from the state of Maryland. The others are Cigar, Awad, Concern, Broad Brush and the filly Safely Kept.

== Racing career ==
Little Bold John competed 105 times during nine seasons, winning 38 races, of which 25 were stakes. That ranks him fourth in stakes victories among thoroughbreds in North America behind Native Diver with 34 stakes wins, John Henry with 30 stakes wins, and Who Doctor Who with 26. In a 1997 interview with the Baltimore Sun, Robb said that Little Bold John, who earned $2,056,406, was the best horse he had ever trained. "Not only that," Robb said. "I think he's the best horse we ever had in Maryland. I could run him short, long, on the turf, the dirt, in the mud, and he'd win anyway. That makes him special over any horse I've ever seen."

Little Bold John overcame injuries and retirement to return to the races. In 1992, though, Robb retired the gelding permanently. "In his last race, he hurt himself about the quarter pole and dropped back to third or fourth," Robb said. "He pulled his suspensory ligament. Most horses, when they get hurt, pull up. But he came back to win the race, like he was three-legged. After that, I knew he'd end up killing himself if I kept running him."

Little Bold John's final race was on Halloween 1992 at Pimlico Race Course. He was 10, having raced every year since 1984 when he was two. His biggest win came at Gulfstream Park in the Donn Handicap a grade one stakes worth $175,000. Little Bold John paid a record $113.80 to win that race. He also won two $200,000 stakes in Maryland, including the grade two General George Handicap and the Maryland Million Classic, both at Laurel Park Racecourse.

Breeder Clagett sold Little Bold John to Anne Arundel County businessman Jack Owens after his fourth start. Robb remained as trainer and bought Little Bold John from Owens in 1990. In 1996, he gave the horse back to Clagett.

== Retirement ==
Following his retirement, owner-trainer Jerry Robb sent Little Bold John to live at Hidden Hill Farm in Edgewater, Maryland. The horse spent the last few years of his life at Weston Farm in Upper Marlboro, Maryland. After suffering an attack of colic, he died at age 21 on January 21, 2003, in the same field where he had lived as a youngster. He was inducted into the Maryland Throughbred Hall of Fame in 2015.

== Pedigree ==
Pedigree of Little Bold John, Dark Brown gelding, 1982
Sire John Alden	Speak John	Prince John	Princequillo
Sire John Alden	Speak John	Prince John	Not Afraid
Sire John Alden	Speak John	Nuit de Foiles	Tornado
Sire John Alden	Speak John	Nuit de Foiles	Folle Nuit
Sire John Alden	Nicoma	Nashua	Nasrullah
Sire John Alden	Nicoma	Nashua	Segula
Sire John Alden	Nicoma	Hasty Flirt	Hasty Road
Sire John Alden	Nicoma	Hasty Flirt	Chantress
Dam Little Bold Sphinx	Bold Ambition	Bold Ruler	Nasrullah
Dam Little Bold Sphinx	Bold Ambition	Bold Ruler	Miss Disco
Dam Little Bold Sphinx	Bold Ambition	Be Ambitious	Ambiorix
Dam Little Bold Sphinx	Bold Ambition	Be Ambitious	Be Faithful
Dam Little Bold Sphinx	Restless Sphinx	Restless Native	Native Dancer
Dam Little Bold Sphinx	Restless Sphinx	Restless Native	Next Move
Dam Little Bold Sphinx	Restless Sphinx	Inscrutable	Hafiz
Dam Little Bold Sphinx	Restless Sphinx	Inscrutable	Little Sphinx (family: 4-r)
