= Broad Brush =

American-bred Thoroughbred racehorse

- Sire: Ack Ack
- Grandsire: Battle Joined
- Dam: Hay Patcher
- Damsire: Hoist The Flag
- Sex: Stallion
- Foaled: April 16, 1983
- Country: United States
- Colour: Brown
- Breeder: Robert E. Meyerhoff
- Owner: Robert E. Meyerhoff
- Trainer: Richard W. Small
- Record: 27: 14-5-5
- Earnings: $2,656,793

Major wins
- Inner Harbor Stakes (1985); Meadowlands Cup (1986); Wood Memorial (1986); Jim Beam Stakes (1986); Pennsylvania Derby (1986); Ohio Derby (1986); Federico Tesio Stakes (1986); General George Handicap (1986); Santa Anita Handicap (1987); Suburban Handicap (1987); John B. Campbell Handicap (1987); Trenton Handicap (1987)

Awards
- Leading sire in North America (1994)

Broad Brush (April 16, 1983 – May 15, 2009) was an American thoroughbred racehorse foaled in Maryland. He was by the Hall of Fame stallion Ack Ack out of the Hoist The Flag mare Hay Patcher.

Bred and owned by Robert E. Meyerhoff and trained by Richard W. Small, Broad Brush won a number of stakes races at age two before being prepped for the 1986 Kentucky Derby.

== Three-year-old season ==
At age three, Broad Brush won a number of stakes races, including the Inner Harbor Stakes at Pimlico Race Course, the grade two Jim Beam Stakes at Turfway Park, the grade one Wood Memorial Stakes at Aqueduct Racetrack, the grade three Federico Tesio Stakes (also called the "Preakness Trial") at Pimlico, the grade two Pennsylvania Derby at Philadelphia Park, the grade two Ohio Derby at Thistledown, and the grade one Meadowlands Cup. The Pennsylvania Derby win was notable for Broad Brush bolting to the outside rail on the final turn, seemingly costing him the race as several competitors passed him. Jockey Angel Cordero Jr gathered the colt and directed him along the outside rail to pass his rivals late in the stretch for the win.

Broad Brush also placed third in two of the most coveted races in the country in the United States Triple Crown of Thoroughbred Racing, showing in both the Kentucky Derby and Preakness Stakes. He finished a close third behind Ferdinand two lengths back and Bold Arrangement (by a head) in the grade one Kentucky Derby in 1986 in a field of 16 colts. Broad Brush also was third as the local Maryland favorite in the $1,000,000 grade one Preakness Stakes behind eventual Eclipse Award winner Snow Chief and Derby champ Ferdinand. Snow Chief was named the American Champion Three-Year-Old Male Horse in large part due to his Preakness win.

== Four-year-old season ==
At age four, Broad Brush won some of the most prestigious races in the handicap division, including the $1,000,000 grade one Santa Anita Handicap and the grade one Suburban Handicap at Belmont Park. He placed second in the Massachusetts Handicap and Grade I San Fernando Stakes, and he was third in the Grade I Metropolitan Handicap, Grade I Strub Stakes, and Grade I Whitney Handicap.

== Retirement ==
After his retirement in April 1988, Broad Brush became a very successful sire, being awarded Leading sire in North America for 1994. He was one of the leading draws for Gainesway Farm's Kentucky breeding operation and was ranked in the top 10 leading sires for four straight years. His progeny include the stakes-winning Concern, Include, Farda Amiga, Hesanoldsalt, Nobo True, Best Of Luck, the Japanese champion mare Broad Appeal, Justenuffheart (dam of the champion filly Dreaming of Anna) and Arlucea (dam of 2012 Breeders' Cup Classic winner Fort Larned). Broad Brush was pensioned in 2004 and was euthanized on May 15, 2009.

== Sire line tree ==
- Broad Brush
  - Schossberg
  - Concern
    - Good Night Shirt
  - Best Of Luck
  - Nobo True
  - Include
    - Ferox
    - Redeemed
    - Don Inc
    - Mishegas
    - Riker
  - Mongoose
  - Quest Star
  - Hesanoldsalt

== Pedigree ==
Pedigree of Broad Brush, bay stallion, foaled April 16, 1983
Sire Ack Ack bay 1966	Battle Joined b. 1959	Armageddon b. 1949	Alsab
Sire Ack Ack bay 1966	Battle Joined b. 1959	Armageddon b. 1949	Fighting Lady
Sire Ack Ack bay 1966	Battle Joined b. 1959	Ethel Walker b. 1953	Revoked
Sire Ack Ack bay 1966	Battle Joined b. 1959	Ethel Walker b. 1953	Ethel Terry
Sire Ack Ack bay 1966	Fast Turn b. 1959	Turn-to* b. 1951	Royal Charger*
Sire Ack Ack bay 1966	Fast Turn b. 1959	Turn-to* b. 1951	Source Sucree*
Sire Ack Ack bay 1966	Fast Turn b. 1959	Cherokee Rose b. 1951	Princequillo
Sire Ack Ack bay 1966	Fast Turn b. 1959	Cherokee Rose b. 1951	The Squaw II
Dam Hay Patcher bay 1973	Hoist The Flag b. 1968	Tom Rolfe b. 1962	Ribot
Dam Hay Patcher bay 1973	Hoist The Flag b. 1968	Tom Rolfe b. 1962	Pocahontas
Dam Hay Patcher bay 1973	Hoist The Flag b. 1968	Wavy Navy b. 1954	War Admiral
Dam Hay Patcher bay 1973	Hoist The Flag b. 1968	Wavy Navy b. 1954	Triomphe
Dam Hay Patcher bay 1973	Turn to Talent b. 1963	Turn-to* b. 1951	Royal Charger*
Dam Hay Patcher bay 1973	Turn to Talent b. 1963	Turn-to* b. 1951	Source Sucree*
Dam Hay Patcher bay 1973	Turn to Talent b. 1963	Hidden Talent b. 1956	Dark Star
Dam Hay Patcher bay 1973	Turn to Talent b. 1963	Hidden Talent b. 1956	Dangerous Dame (family: 21-a)

* Broad Brush is inbred 3S x 3D to the stallion Turn-To, meaning that he appears third generation on the sire side of his pedigree, and third generation on the dam side of his pedigree.
