= Bud Delp =

American horse trainer (1932–2006)

Personal information
- Born: September 7, 1932 Creswell, Maryland, U.S.
- Died: December 29, 2006 (aged 74) Ellicott City, Maryland, U.S.
- Occupation: Trainer

Horse racing career
- Sport: Horse racing
- Career wins: 3,674

Major racing wins
- Black-Eyed Susan Stakes (1976, 1994); Massachusetts Handicap (1976, 2001); Kentucky Oaks (1977); Blue Grass Stakes (1979); Florida Derby (1979); Santa Anita Handicap (1980); Louisiana Handicap (1982, 1984, 1985); Cornhusker Handicap (1984, 1990); Cigar Mile Handicap (1989); Woodward Stakes (1990); Hawthorne Gold Cup Handicap (1991); Pimlico Special (2001) American Classics wins: Kentucky Derby (1979); Preakness Stakes (1979)

Racing awards
- Eclipse Award for Outstanding Trainer (1980)

Honours
- National Museum of Racing and Hall of Fame (2002); Fair Grounds Racing Hall of Fame (2002)

Significant horses
- Spectacular Bid, Include, Dispersal, What A Summer, Sweet Alliance, Concerned Minister, Calipha, Western Echo, Sunny Sunrise, Timeless Native, Aspro, Truly Bound, Perfect Score
- Updated on January 27, 2007

Grover Greer "Bud" Delp (September 7, 1932 – December 29, 2006) was an American Hall of Fame Thoroughbred racehorse trainer best remembered for his conditioning of Hall of Fame colt, Spectacular Bid, who according to Delp was "The greatest horse to ever look through a bridle".

Bud Delp began his career as a Thoroughbred trainer in 1962 and in 1980 was voted the Eclipse Award for Outstanding Trainer. Delp, along with John J. Tammaro, Jr., King T. Leatherbury and Richard E. Dutrow, Sr. were known as Maryland racing's "Big Four" who dominated racing in that state during the 1960s and 1970s and who helped modernize thoroughbred racing.

During his career, Bud Delp's horses won 3,674 races and earned purses totaling nearly $41 million. He ended his career at a 20.5 win percentage. In 2002, an honor he said he was most proud of, Delp was inducted into the United States' National Museum of Racing and Hall of Fame.
