= William J. Passmore =

American jockey (1933–2009)

Personal information
- Born: March 8, 1933 West Chester, Pennsylvania, United States
- Died: May 14, 2009 (aged 76)
- Occupation: Jockey/Racing Steward

Horse racing career
- Sport: Horse racing
- Career wins: 3,531

Major racing wins
- Woodlawn Stakes (1969, 1981 (2x)); John B. Campbell Handicap (1972); Firenze Handicap (1974); Top Flight Handicap (1975); Gravesend Handicap (1976); Hirsch Jacobs Stakes (1979); Fashion Stakes (1982); Sorority Stakes (1982); Pennsylvania Derby (1983); Morven Stakes (1984)

Significant horses
- Dixieland Band, Cure the Blues

William J. "Bill" Passmore Sr. (March 8, 1933 – May 14, 2009) was an American jockey and racing steward who raced thoroughbred horses for 38 years, including at the Kentucky Derby, Preakness Stakes, and Belmont Stakes, winning 3,531 races and $23 million in prize money before spending 20 years as a steward.

The 5-foot-5-inch (165 cm), 99-pound (45 kg) jockey was born in West Chester, Pennsylvania, where Passmore's father, William L. Passmore, was a successful steeplechase jockey and trainer who worked for area horse breeder Bayard Sharp. Passmore's first mount was on May 23, 1948, at the age of 15, one year below the legal minimum, aboard Minneapolis at the now-defunct Jamaica Race Course in Queens, New York. Passmore's father pulled him out of school at age 16 so that he could help support the family.

He rode Hannibal to an eighth-place finish in a field of 16 at the running of the 1952 Kentucky Derby, the only time he rode in that race. His only appearance in the Belmont Stakes was in 1983 when he finished in 14th aboard Dixieland Band. He rode in the Preakness Stakes three times, finishing seventh aboard Galdar in 1954, riding Knight Landing to a seventh-place finish in 1980, and finishing fourth atop Thirty Eight Paces in 1981.

In 1981, Passmore became the 32nd jockey in North American racing to win 3,000 races, part of a career in which he won 3,531 races and $23 million in purses out of 29,490 mounts. He retired from racing in 1986, having interrupted his 38-year career in the early 1960s for a year and a half when he worked as a jockey's valet while trying to break out of a slump. During his years as a jockey, Mr. Passmore regularly rode for King T. Leatherbury, Jim McKay, and Art Rooney. Among the notable horses that Passmore rode were Christopher R, Cure the Blues, Jameela, and Twixt.

Racing editor and historian Joseph B. Kelly of the Washington Star described Passmore as having a "great sense of pace and a great touch with horses" and as a jockey "who never seemed to get too excited and was always very calm when aboard a horse." Passmore himself told the Baltimore Sun in 1971 that he would infrequently use a whip during a stretch run, "preferring to urge his mount with his hands and body as if he were a part of the horse", as "the whip isn't going to do any good" if the horse is already giving his best.

He used his experience as a jockey to serve as a steward for the Maryland Racing Commission, starting from when he left riding in 1986 until his deteriorating health forced him to retire a year before his death. Former racing writer Ross Peddicord of the Baltimore Sun described Passmore's honesty and fairness in his role as a steward making him one of the "pillars that perpetuated the reputation of Maryland racing for world-class horsemanship, undisputed class and quality...". Passmore was leery of accepting betting suggestions from jockeys who he characterized as "the worst touts at the track. I think the track makes a big mistake not installing a mutuel window in the jocks' room."

Passmore died at age 76 in his home in Millersville, Maryland, on May 14, 2009, due to complications from emphysema.
