= 1939 Kentucky Derby =

Horse race

65th Kentucky Derby
- Kentucky Derby
- Grade I stakes race
- Location: Churchill Downs
- Date: May 6, 1939
- Winning horse: Johnstown
- Jockey: James Stout
- Trainer: James E. Fitzsimmons
- Owner: Belair Stud
- Surface: Dirt

The 1939 Kentucky Derby was the 65th running of the Kentucky Derby. The race took place on May 6, 1939.

== Full results ==
Finished	Post	Horse	Jockey	Trainer	Owner	Time / behind
1st		Johnstown	James Stout	James E. Fitzsimmons	Belair Stud	2:03 2/5
2nd		Challedon	George Seabo	Louis Schaefer	William L. Brann	
3rd		Heather Broom	Basil James	Earl Sande	John Hay Whitney	
4th		Viscounty	Carroll Bierman	John J. Flanigan	Valdina Farms Stable	
5th		Technician	Johnny Adams	Ben A. Jones	Woolford Farm	
6th		El Chico	Nick Wall	Matthew P. Brady	William Ziegler Jr.	
7th		T. M. Dorsett	Leon Haas	John B. Theall	Joe W. Brown	
8th		On Location	Alfred M. Robertson	Roy Waldron	Milky Way Farm Stable	

- Winning breeder: Claiborne Farm (KY)
