= 1948 Belmont Stakes =

American horse race

80th Belmont Stakes
- Belmont Stakes
- Grade I stakes race
- Location: Belmont Park; Elmont, New York, U.S.
- Date: June 12, 1948
- Distance: 1 1/2 mi (12 furlongs; 2,414 m)
- Winning horse: Citation
- Winning time: 2:28 1/5
- Jockey: Eddie Arcaro
- Trainer: Horace A. "Jimmy" Jones
- Owner: Calumet Farm
- Conditions: Fast
- Surface: Dirt

The 1948 Belmont Stakes was the 80th running of the Belmont Stakes. It was the 42nd Belmont Stakes held at Belmont Park in Elmont, New York and was run on June 12, 1948. With a field of eight horses, after Coaltown was scratched, eight runners remained. Citation, the winner of that year's Kentucky Derby and Preakness Stakes won the 1 1/2–mile race (12 f; 2.4 km) by 8 lengths over Better Self.

With the win, Citation became the eighth Triple Crown champion.

== Results ==
| Finish | PP | Horse | Jockey | Trainer | Owner | Final odds | Earnings US$ |
|---|---|---|---|---|---|---|---|
| 1 | 1 | Citation | Eddie Arcaro | Horace A. Jones | Calumet Farm | .20 | $77,000 |
| 2 | 8 | Better Self | Warren Mehrtens | Max Hirsch | King Ranch | 12.50 | $20,000 |
| 3 | 3 | Escadru | Arnold Kirkland | Edward A. Christmas | William L. Brann | 6.85 | $10,000 |
| 4 | 5 | Vulcan's Forge | Douglas Dodson | Sylvester Veitch | Cornelius Vanderbilt Whitney | 15.10 | $5,000 |
| 5 | 7 | Gasparilla | Ruperto Donoso | Max Hirsch | Arthur J. Sackett | 12.50 | |
| 6 | 6 | Salmagundi | Eric Guerin | Willie Booth | William G. Helis Sr. | 22.45 | |
| 7 | 4 | Golden Light | Nick Combest | James E. Fitzsimmons | Belair Stud | 82.50 | |
| 8 | 2 | Faraway | Ted Atkinson | Clay Sutphin | Glen Riddle Farm | 28.10 | |

- Winning breeder: Calumet Farm (KY)

== Payout ==
| Horse | Straight | Place | Show |
|---|---|---|---|
| Citation | $2.40 | $2.30 | $2.10 |
| Better Self | – | $3.70 | $2.10 |
| Escadru | – | – | $2.10 |

- Based on a $2 wager.
