= New England Futurity =

- Class: Discontinued stakes
- Location: Narragansett Park; Pawtucket, Rhode Island, USA
- Inaugurated: 1936-1940
- Race type: Thoroughbred - Flat racing

Race information
- Distance: 6 furlongs (3/4 mile)
- Surface: Dirt
- Track: left-handed
- Qualification: Two-years-old

The New England Futurity was a short-lived Thoroughbred stakes race at Narragansett Park in Pawtucket, Rhode Island which the Daily Racing Form reported it to be "New England's richest and most important stake" For two-year-old entire colts and fillies, it was first run on October 28, 1936.

== The Races ==
In a major upset, the Ethel V. Mars colt Reaping Reward ($25.20) defeated Jerome H. Loucheim's overwhelming favorite Pompoon to win the inaugural running.

The second edition of the New England Futurity was never run due to in what became known as The Race Track War. It had been scheduled to run on Saturday, October 23, 1937 but in the days leading up to the race, a dispute got out of hand between Rhode Island Governor Robert Quinn and Walter E. O'Hara, Managing Director of the Narragansett Racing Association which owned and operated Narragansett Park. The Rhode Island state Horse Racing Division ordered O'Hara's removal as a track official and revoked the track's license at the close of the summer race meet. On October 17, Quinn declared that Narragansett Park was "in a state of insurrection," and ordered the National Guard to enforce martial law and lock down the track. There would be no fall racing, and the situation would not be resolved until February 9, 1938 when a court order resulted in law enforcement seizing the racetrack's record books. O'Hara then resigned and was replaced by track secretary Judge James Dooley.

When racing resumed at Narragansett Park, the 1938 edition provided racing fans with a glimpse of the greatness to come from the Maryland owned, bred and raced Challedon who beat a strong field.

On September 28, 1939, over a muddy track, Parker Corning's Straight Lead won. Trained by future National Museum of Racing and Hall of Fame inductee Max Hirsch, the colt beat Fenelon from the powerful Belair Stud stable.

In 1940, Robert W. McIlvain's Walmac Farm won the race with the colt Bushwhacker. At the new distance of six furlongs, he beat Anne Corning's colt Attention who had twice beaten Whirlaway, the Calumet Farm colt who would go on to win the 1941 U.S. Triple Crown.

== Winners ==
| Year | Winner | Age | Jockey | Trainer | Owner | Dist. (Miles) (Furlongs) | Time | Win$ |
|---|---|---|---|---|---|---|---|---|
| 1940 | Bushwhacker | 2 | Arthur Craig | Howard Wells | Walmac Farm | 6 F | 1:11.80 | $38,060 |
| 1939 | Straight Lead | 2 | Ronnie Nash | Max Hirsch | Parker Corning | 1 mi, 70 yds | 1:46.60 | $37,900 |
| 1938 | Challedon | 2 | George Seabo | Louis Schaefer | William L. Brann | 1 mi, 70 yds | 1:46.40 | $33,410 |
| 1937 | No race | | | | | | | |
| 1936 | Reaping Reward | 2 | Charlie Stevenson | Robert V. McGarvey | Milky Way Farm Stable | 1 mi, 70 yds | 1:41.60 | $36,850 |
