= Wilson Handicap =

- Class: Discontinued stakes
- Location: Jamaica Racetrack; Jamaica, Queens, New York
- Inaugurated: 1930
- Race type: Thoroughbred - Flat racing

Race information
- Distance: 6 furlong sprint
- Track: Dirt, left-handed
- Qualification: Three-years-old & up

The Wilson Handicap was an American Thoroughbred horse race run from 1930 through 1958. Inaugurated as the Wilson Stakes at the Saratoga Race Course in Saratoga Springs, New York, it was named in honor of the late Richard Thornton Wilson Jr., a prominent Thoroughbred owner and president of Saratoga Race Course.

== Historical notes ==
The first running took place on August 2, 1930 and was contested at a distance of one mile (8 furlongs). It was won by the Glen Riddle Farm colt Battleship Gray who owned his sire, the legendary Man o' War.

Due to government wartime restrictions, the 1943 to 1945 runnings of the Wilson Stakes took place at Belmont Park. In July 1954, the race was shifted permanently to Jamaica Racetrack in Jamaica, New York where it was renamed the Wilson Handicap and run as a six furlong sprint. The event remained at the Jamaica track through 1958 and was then canceled due to the closure of the Jamaica facility on August 1, 1959.

In 1946 the future Hall of Fame filly Gallorette ran second in the Wilson Stakes but came back the next year to win the August 4, 1947 edition in a Saratoga track record time of 1:35 2/5 for the mile on dirt. In 1948 Gallorette returned to compete and her second straight Wilson Stakes.

The final running of the Wilson was held on July 29, 1958 and was won by Nahodah, a Marion duPont Scott homebred gelding.

Seven horses that won the Wilson Stakes, Devil Diver, Discovery, Eight Thirty, Equipoise, Gallorette, Tom Fool, War Admiral, all went on to have racing careers that would earn them induction into the U.S. Racing Hall of Fame.

== Records ==
Speed record:

- 1:10.40 @ 6 furlongs : Nahodah (1950)
- 1:35.40 @ 1 mile (8 furlongs) : Gallorette (1947)

Most wins:

- 2 - Equipoise (1932, 1933)
- 2 - Discovery (1935, 1936)
- 2 - Eight Thirty (1939, 1940)
- 2 - Gallorette (1947, 1948)
- 2 - Tom Fool (1952, 1953)

Most wins by a jockey:

- 5 - Ted Atkinson (1944, 1951, 1952, 1953, 1954)

Most wins by a trainer:

- 6 - John M. Gaver Sr. (1943, 1944, 1950, 1951, 1952, 1953)

Most wins by an owner:

- 6 - Greentree Stable (1943, 1944, 1950, 1951, 1952, 1953)

== Winners ==
Year	Winner	Age	Jockey	Trainer	Owner	Dist. (Furlongs) (Miles)	Time
1958	Nahodah	5	Joe Culmone	Frank A. Bonsal	Montpelier Stable	6 f	1:10.40
1957	Jovial Jove	4	Sam Boulmetis Sr.	Charles P. Sanborn	Bwamazon Farm	6 f	1:11.20
1956	Ambergris	4	Hedley Woodhouse	Winbert F. Mulholland	George D. Widener Jr.	6 f	1:10.60
1955	Mr. Turf	6	James D. Nichols	Francis J. Horan	Jack J. Amiel	6 f	1:11.60
1954	First Glance	7	Hedley Woodhouse	William C. Winfrey	Alfred G. Vanderbilt Jr.	6 f	1:11.60
1953	Tom Fool	4	Ted Atkinson	John M. Gaver Sr.	Greentree Stable	1 m	1:37.20
1952	Tom Fool	3	Ted Atkinson	John M. Gaver Sr.	Greentree Stable	1 m	1:39.40
1951	Hall of Fame	3	Ted Atkinson	John M. Gaver Sr.	Greentree Stable	1 m	1:37.60
1950	Capot	4	Ted Atkinson	John M. Gaver Sr.	Greentree Stable	1 m	1:38.40
1949	Manyunk	4	Gordon Glisson	George E. Roberts	Barney Foster & Henry W. Collins	1 m	1:40.00
1948	Gallorette	6	Job Dean Jessop	Edward A. Christmas	William L. Brann	1 m	1:38.40
1947	Gallorette	5	Job Dean Jessop	Edward A. Christmas	William L. Brann	1 m	1:35.40
1946	Pavot	4	Arnold Kirkland	Oscar White	Walter M. Jeffords Sr.	1 m	1:36.60
1945	Brownie	6	Eric Guerin	John B. Theall	John B. Theall	1 m	1:37.00
1944	Devil Diver	5	Ted Atkinson	John M. Gaver Sr.	Greentree Stable	1 m	1:36.20
1943	Shut Out	4	Wayne D. Wright	John M. Gaver Sr.	Greentree Stable	1 m	1:36.40
1942	Apache	3	James Stout	James E. Fitzsimmons	Belair Stud Stable	1 m	1:37.00
1941	Parasang	4	Basil James	Edward L. Snyder	Cornelius Vanderbilt Whitney	1 m	1:38.80
1940	Eight Thirty	4	Harry Richards	Winbert F. Mulholland	George D. Widener Jr.	1 m	1:39.00
1939	Eight Thirty	3	Harry Richards	Winbert F. Mulholland	George D. Widener Jr.	1 m	1:37.00
1938	War Admiral	4	Charles Kurtsinger	George H. Conway	Glen Riddle Farm	1 m	1:39.40
1937	Esposa	5	Nick Wall	Matthew P. Brady	Middleburg Stable (William Ziegler Jr.)	1 m	1:38.40
1936	Discovery	5	John Bejshak	Joseph H. Stotler	Alfred G. Vanderbilt Jr.	1 m	1:38.80
1935	Discovery	4	John Bejshak	Joseph H. Stotler	Alfred G. Vanderbilt Jr.	1 m	1:37.20
1934	Observant	3	Silvio Coucci	Max Hirsch	Morton L. Schwartz	1 m	1:37.60
1933	Equipoise	5	Raymond Workman	Thomas J. Healey	Cornelius Vanderbilt Whitney	1 m	1:39.00
1932	Equipoise	4	Raymond Workman	Thomas J. Healey	Cornelius Vanderbilt Whitney	1 m	1:38.20
1931	Blind Bowboy	3	Laverne Fator	Herbert J. Thompson	Edward R. Bradley	1 m	1:38.00
1930	Battleship Gray	4	Henry Erickson	William R. Midgley	Glen Riddle Farm	1 m	1:38.60
