= Challenger (horse) =

Irish-bred Thoroughbred racehorse

Challenger II
- Sire: Swynford
- Grandsire: John O'Gaunt
- Dam: Sword Play
- Damsire: Great Sport
- Sex: Stallion
- Foaled: 1927
- Country: Ireland
- Colour: Bay
- Breeder: The National Stud
- Owner: 1) Lord Dewar; 2) William L. Brann & Robert S. Castle
- Trainer: Fred Darling
- Record: 12: 2-0-1
- Earnings: US$

Major wins
- Clearwell Stakes (1929); Richmond Stakes (1929)

Awards
- Leading sire in North America (1939)

Challenger (1927–1948) was an Irish Thoroughbred racehorse who became a Leading sire in North America.

== Background ==
Challenger was a bay horse bred by The National Stud at Tully in County Kildare, Ireland. As a yearling, Challenger was bought for 5,000 guineas by Lord Dewar.

== Racing career ==
At age two, Challenger made two starts, winning both the Richmond and Clearwell Stakes. Following the death of Lord Dewar, his nephew John Arthur Dewar inherited his horses and, in 1930, he sold Challenger for £10,000, the then equivalent of US$100,000, to the American racing partnership of William Brann and Robert Castle.

Registered in the United States as Challenger II, the expensive colt never fully recovered from an injury to his hocks and had no success on American racetracks. However, as a sire, he would prove to be more than worth the price Brann and Castle paid for him.

== Stud record ==
Challenger stood at stud at his owners Branncastle Farm near Walkersville, Maryland, where he proved a very successful sire and was the leading sire in North America in 1939. His best son was Challedon, a colt born in 1936 whose major wins included the Preakness Stakes, the Pimlico Special, and the Hollywood Gold Cup. Challedon was voted American Horse of the Year in 1939 and 1940 and, following its formation, was inducted into the National Museum of Racing and Hall of Fame. In 1942, Challenger sired Gallorette, a filly who regularly beat her male counterparts while winning major events, such as the Brooklyn and Metropolitan Handicaps. Gallorette was voted the American Champion Older Female Horse of 1946 and, following its formation, was inducted into the National Museum of Racing and Hall of Fame. The following year, Challenger sired Bridal Flower who was voted the 1946 American Champion Three-Year-Old Filly.

In addition, Challenger's 1937 son, Pictor, was a multiple stakes winner. Another son born in 1941, Challenge Me, won top races in 1944, such as the Oaklawn Handicap, which he won by ten lengths while setting a new track record. He followed up with a win in the Arkansas Derby. In 1945, he added to his win total with a victory in that fall's Hollywood Gold Cup.

Through his daughter Gallita, Challenger was damsire of Nadir, the American Co-Champion Two-Year-Old Colt of 1957. Other good runners that Challenger was the damsire for included two racemares. The first was Christopher Chenery's Rich Tradition (1954) and the second, Harry Guggenheim's Ashland Stakes winner Jota Jota (1956).

Challenger died at age twenty-one in 1948 and was buried in the Branncastle farm (renamed the Glade Valley Farm) equine cemetery.

== Sire line tree ==
- Challenger
  - Challedon
    - Donor
    - Shy Guy
    - Sabaean
    - Ancestor
  - Pictor
  - Vincentive
  - Challenge Me
  - Errard
    - Southharlington
    - Laffango
    - Errard King
  - Escadru

== Pedigree ==
Pedigree of Challenger II
Sire Swynford	John O'Gaunt	Isinglass	Isonomy*
Sire Swynford	John O'Gaunt	Isinglass	Dead Lock
Sire Swynford	John O'Gaunt	La Fleche	St Simon*
Sire Swynford	John O'Gaunt	La Fleche	Quiver
Sire Swynford	Canterbury Pilgrim	Tristan	Hermit*
Sire Swynford	Canterbury Pilgrim	Tristan	Thrift
Sire Swynford	Canterbury Pilgrim	Pilgrimage*	The Palmer*
Sire Swynford	Canterbury Pilgrim	Pilgrimage*	Lady Audley*
Dam Sword Play	Great Sport	Gallinule	Isonomy*
Dam Sword Play	Great Sport	Gallinule	Moorhen*
Dam Sword Play	Great Sport	Gondolette	Loved One*
Dam Sword Play	Great Sport	Gondolette	Dongola
Dam Sword Play	Flash of Steel	Royal Realm	Persimmon*
Dam Sword Play	Flash of Steel	Royal Realm	Sand Blast
Dam Sword Play	Flash of Steel	Flaming Vixen	Flying Fox
Dam Sword Play	Flash of Steel	Flaming Vixen	Amphora

* Challenger is inbred 3S x 5D to the mare Pilgrimage, meaning that she appears third generation on the sire side of his pedigree, and fifth generation (via Loved One) on the dam side of his pedigree.

* Challenger is inbred 4S x 4D to the stallion Isonomy, meaning that he appears fourth generation on the sire side of his pedigree, and fourth generation on the dam side of his pedigree.

* Challenger is inbred 4S x 5D to the stallion St Simon, meaning that he appears fourth generation on the sire side of his pedigree, and fifth generation (via Persimmon) on the dam side of his pedigree.

* Challenger is inbred 4S x 5D to the stallion Hermit, meaning that he appears fourth generation on the sire side of his pedigree, and fifth generation (via Moorhen) on the dam side of his pedigree.
