= Social Outcast =

American-bred Thoroughbred racehorse

- Sire: Shut Out
- Grandsire: Equipoise
- Dam: Pansy
- Damsire: Sickle (GB)
- Sex: Gelding
- Foaled: 1950
- Died: 1969
- Country: United States
- Colour: Chestnut
- Breeder: Mrs. Raymond A. Van Clief
- Owner: Alfred Gwynne Vanderbilt Jr.
- Trainer: William C. Winfrey
- Record: 58: 18-9-6
- Earnings: $668,300

Major wins
- Remsen Handicap (1952); Whitney Handicap (1954); Rhode Island Special (1954); Narragansett Special ((1954)); Gallant Fox Handicap (1954); McLennan Handicap (1955); John B. Campbell Handicap (1955); Lincoln Special (1955); Sunset Handicap (1955); Saratoga Handicap (1955); Manhattan Handicap (1955); Trenton Handicap (1955)

Social Outcast (foaled 1950) was an American Thoroughbred racehorse sired by Shut Out (a son of Equipoise) out of the mare Pansy (by the English import Sickle). He was bred in Maryland by Mrs. Raymond A. Van Clief. Social Outcast was owned and named by Alfred Gwynne Vanderbilt Jr., who often played with the names of the sire and dam to provide a name for his horse. Thus, a mating of Shut Out and Pansy produced Social Outcast.

== The First Third ==
At age 2, Social Outcast won 5 of 10 races. His first year of racing culminated in a win at Jamaica Race Course in the Remsen Handicap. He dropped a nose decision but was placed first by the stewards via the disqualification of Jamie K. When Social Outcast was three, he was overshadowed by his more famous stable-mate, Native Dancer, who became a national fan favorite. The exploits of the "Grey Ghost" were chronicled on television, and he was one of its first stars. Still, Social Outcast made it to the starting gate of the Kentucky Derby at Churchill Downs and was coupled as an entry with Native Dancer. They went off as 7-10 favorites and "the Grey Ghost of Sagamore" lost for the only time in his 22-race career. Social Outcast came home 7th and went 0 for 9 for 1953. His overall record dropped to 5 wins in 19 starts.

== Handicap Star ==
Social Outcast found increased success as a four-year-old. In 1954, he ran twelve times with 5 wins, four in stakes. Vanderbilt had a 1-2 punch in the handicap division, and Native Dancer was the consensus Handicap Champion as well as Horse of the Year despite an abbreviated campaign due to a forefoot injury. He added those crowns to his 2 year old and 3 year old titles. With wins in the Whitney Handicap at historic Saratoga Race Course and the Narragansett Special, Social Outcast was the 2nd best handicap horse in the country. The hard-hitting gelding won a poll conducted by the Thoroughbred Record which was a mathematical scoring system based on stakes races. "Old Sosh", as he was known in the barn, ran in more races, so he had more points. He earned over 190k that season.

In 1955, Social Outcast went 8 for 22 with 7 stake wins and several track records. After winning the McLennan at Hialeah Park and Race Course, he went back to Maryland and set a track record of 1:42 2/5 for 1 1/16 miles in the John B. Campbell Handicap at Bowie Race Course. He next went out west to Hollywood Park Racetrack and won the 100k Sunset Handicap in a record time of 2:40 3/5 for the 1 5/8s mile contest. His last track record came at Garden State Park in the Trenton Handicap, where he ran 1 1/4 miles in 2:01. His earnings for the year hit $390,775.

Social Outcast came back at age six and ran second in three stakes at Hialeah. He faced 1955 Horse of the Year Nashua in the 129k Widener Handicap, the East Coast's biggest race of the winter. It was the year's first start for Nashua, and he was the 127 lb. high-weight. And in the end, it was four horses across the track with jockey Eddie Arcaro having Nashua's head in front of Social Outcast.

== Retirement ==
The gelding was soon retired to Alfred G. Vanderbilt II's Sagamore Farm in Glyndon, Maryland.

His final record reads; 58 starts: 19 - 9 - 6 - $668,300 in earnings. He won twelve stake races at nine different tracks from coast to coast and ran at many more.

Social Outcast died in 1969 at the age of 19.
