= Arnold Kirkland =

American jockey (1921–1969)

Personal information
- Born: November 11, 1921 Petersburg, Virginia, US
- Died: March 15, 1969 (aged 47)
- Occupation: Jockey

Horse racing career
- Sport: Horse racing

Major racing wins
- Delaware Handicap (1944); Astoria Stakes (1945); Beldame Stakes (1945); Belmont Futurity Stakes (1945); Demoiselle Stakes (1945); Discovery Handicap (1945); Hopeful Stakes (1945); Interborough Handicap (1945); Ladies Handicap (1945); Manhattan Handicap (1945); Marguerite Stakes (1945); Matron Stakes (1945); National Stallion Stakes (1945); Pimlico Futurity (1945); Wood Memorial Stakes (1945); American Legion Handicap (1946); Rowe Memorial Handicap (1946); Fashion Stakes (1946); Fleetwing Handicap (1946); Massachusetts Handicap (1946); Questionnaire Handicap (1946); Rhode Island Handicap (1946); Santa Susana Stakes (1946); Wilson Stakes (1946); Champagne Stakes (1947); Jennings Handicap (1948); Narragansett Special (1948); Peter Pan Stakes (1948); Salvator Mile Handicap (1948); Schuylerville Stakes (1948); Whitney Handicap (1948); Butler Handicap (1949); East View Stakes (1949); Astarita Stakes (1951); Attorney General Purse (1952); Midwest Handicap (1954); Sheridan Handicap (1954); Mayflower Stakes (1955); Exterminator Handicap (1956); Gallorette Handicap (1956)

Significant horses
- Gallorette, Pavot, Star Pilot, First Flight

Arnold Kirkland (November 11, 1921 – March 15, 1969) was an American Thoroughbred horse racing jockey. He was from Petersburg, Virginia and became one of the nation's top jockeys in the 1940s and 1950s.

== Riding career ==
Arnold Kirkland rode in the Kentucky Derby five times. His best finish was a 3rd on Hasseyanda in the 1954 edition won by Determine. Kirkland won the 1948 Peter Pan Stakes on Escadu and with that same horse he challenged Citation on the far turn in the 1948 Belmont Stakes. Kirkland and Escadru made a bold run where the lead was whittled to 2 lengths with just 3/8 of a mile to go. Citation then spurted clear and became the eighth Triple Crown winner while the team of Kirkland and Escadru settled for 3rd.

Kirland rode for many famous owners such as C. V. Whitney and Elizabeth Arden. He won the 1945 Wood Memorial Stakes on Jeep and rode 1946 American Champion Two-Year-Old Filly First Flight to victory in the Fashion Stakes.

Arnold Kirkland won a number of the east coast's important stakes races. They included the 1944 Delaware Handicap on Everget, the 1946 Massachusetts Handicap on Pavot and the Rhode Island Handicap of that year on Man O' Glory. In 1948, he had two signature wins on Gallorette in the Whitney Handicap at Saratoga Race Course and Donor in the Narragansett Special at Narragansett Park just in the month of August.

His last Kentucky Derby mount was on Countermand in the 1956 Kentucky Derby where he drew the #17 post, was extremely wide on the first turn, and came home last (17th) to winner Needles.

Arnold Kirkland died on March 15, 1969, and was interred in the Woodland Cemetery in Richmond, Virginia.
