= Job Dean Jessop =

American jockey (1926–2001)

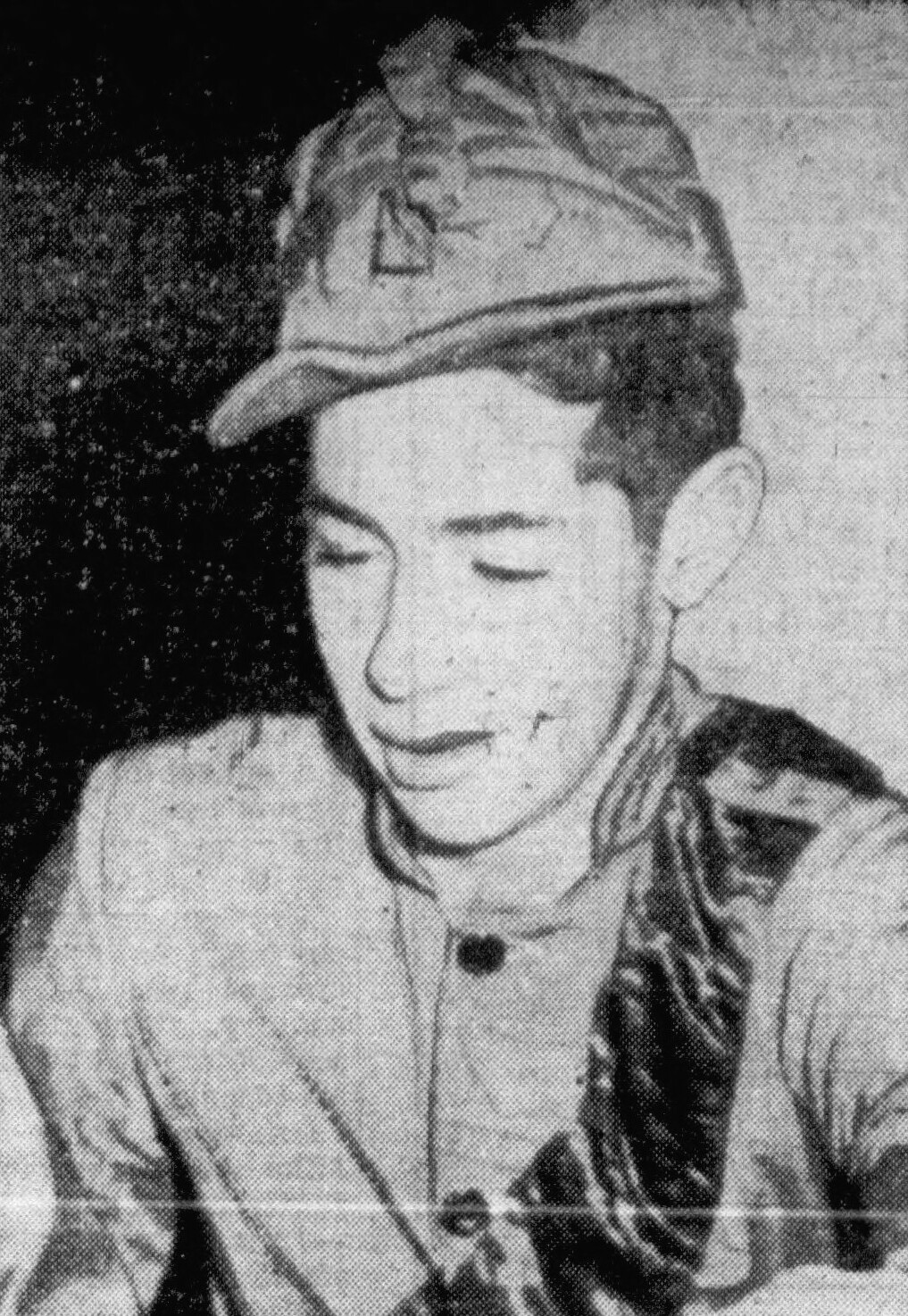
- Jessop, circa 1945

Personal information
- Born: December 4, 1926 Logan, Utah
- Died: January 30, 2001 (aged 74) Boerne, Texas
- Resting place: Boerne Cemetery

Horse racing career
- Sport: Horse racing
- Career wins: Not found

Major racing wins
- Bay Shore Handicap (1946); Beldame Stakes (1946); Brooklyn Handicap (1946); Champagne Stakes (1946); Metropolitan Handicap (1946); Sanford Stakes (1946, 1947); San Juan Capistrano Handicap (1946); Sapling Stakes (1946); Saratoga Special Stakes (1946); Arlington-Washington Futurity Stakes (1947); Jerome Handicap (1947); Matron Stakes (1947); Queens County Handicap (1947); Tremont Stakes (1947); Wilson Stakes (1947, 1948); Carter Handicap (1948); Saratoga Cup (1948); Ashland Stakes (1950); Lafayette Stakes (1950, 1955); Jerome Handicap (1951); Blue Grass Stakes (1951); Southland Handicap (1955); Oaklawn Handicap (1958); British Columbia Oaks (1961)

Racing awards
- United States Champion Jockey by wins (1945)

Significant horses
- Donor, Gallorette, Triplicate, Windfields
- Updated on August 18, 2020

Job Dean Jessop (December 4, 1926 - January 30, 2001) was an American National Champion Thoroughbred racing jockey.

Born in Logan, Utah, Jessop was eighteen when on August 9, 1944, as an apprentice jockey he won six races in one program at Ellis Park Racecourse in Henderson, Kentucky. In 1945 he won more races than any other jockey in the United States, finishing the year with 290 victories. His accomplishment was most impressive as a result of government wartime restrictions which had limited the racing year to approximately seven and one-half months.

Of Jessop's four mounts in the Kentucky Derby, his best result was two third-place finishes. In 1946, he was third on Hampden behind eventual Triple Crown winner, Assault. Guiding the great Hall of Fame mare Gallorette, he won the Queens County Handicap against male horses in 1947. In 1950, he won the Ashland Stakes and the following year rode Ruhe to victory in the Blue Grass Stakes, then finished third with the colt in that year's Derby. Among his other victories, Jessop rode in Vancouver, British Columbia, winning the 1961 B.C. Oaks with the filly Be Famous. He was also the regular rider of Triplicate.

Jessop retired from riding in 1970 and settled in Texas where for a short time he was involved with training horses. He died in 2001 in Boerne, in Kendall County, Texas.
