= Peanuts (horse) =

- Sire: Ambassador IV
- Grandsire: Dark Ronald
- Dam: Agnes Sard
- Damsire: Sardanapale
- Sex: Stallion
- Foaled: 1922
- Country: United States
- Color: Bay
- Breeder: Belair Stud
- Owner: Robert L. Gerry
- Trainer: George P. Odom
- Record: 52: 18-9-6
- Earnings: US$96,915

Major wins
- Mahopac Handicap (1925); Huron Handicap (1925); Knickerbocker Handicap (1925); Edgemere Handicap (1925, 1926); Saranac Handicap (1925); Bowie Handicap (1926); Champlain Handicap (1926); Pierrepont Handicap (1926); Empire City Handicap (1926, 1927); Brookdale Handicap (1927); Brooklyn Handicap (1927)

Peanuts (foaled 1922 in Kentucky) was an American Thoroughbred racehorse who, despite being small in size, successfully competed in top-level events at distances from a mile to a mile and one-quarter. During his four years in racing for prominent New York owner Robert L. Gerry, "little Peanuts," as the press frequently labeled him, would reach elite status when he won a race in world record time.

== Background ==
Peanuts was sired by Ambassador IV who had been imported from England in the fall of 1919 by Belair Stud owner William Woodward Sr. in partnership with Arthur B. Hancock to stand at Hancock's Claiborne Farm in Kentucky. Ambassador IV sired Constancy while at stud in England and had been purchased by Hancock in 1917. She would be named the 1919 American Champion Two-Year-Old Filly. In addition, Ambassador IV also sired St. James, an American Champion Two-Year-Old Colt, as well as the very good runners Priscilla Ruley (1921) and Herrick (1926).

Grandsire Dark Ronald was the Leading Sire in Germany for five straight years from 1918 thru 1922. Dark Ronald was also the sire of Son-in-Law who was a two-time Leading sire in Great Britain and Ireland.

The dam of Peanuts was Agnes Sard who was bred in France by Maurice de Rothschild. She was acquired by Delbert Reiff who brought her to the United States as a yearling. Of her eight foals, Peanuts was the most successful. Agnes Sard's sire was Sardanapale, an outstanding runner and the Leading sire in France in 1927.

== Racing career ==
Throughout his career Peanuts was trained by "Maje" Odom, son of the former jockey and future U.S. Racing Hall of Fame inductee, George Odom.

=== 1924: two-year-old season ===
As a two-year-old, Peanuts' best effort in a stakes race was a third-place finish in the Oakdale Handicap run on a muddy surface at New York's Aqueduct Racetrack.

=== 1925: three-year-old season ===
While Peanuts did not qualify for the 1925 Kentucky Derby, he won five of New York's top level events including the first of two consecutive editions of the Edgemere Handicap in which he was ridden by Harry Richards.

=== 1926: four-year-old World Record season ===
Peanuts won three more important New York races in 1926 including the Empire City Handicap. In winning the Edgemere Handicap at Aqueduct Racetrack for the second time, Peanuts was ridden by Harold Thurber to a new world record time for a mile and one-eighth on dirt with a clocking of 1:48.60. Then, in November at Pimlico Race Course in Baltimore, Peanuts won the Bowie Handicap against a very strong field. He defeated ten other starters including the future U.S. Racing Hall of Fame inductee Princess Doreen, that year's Preakness Stakes winner Display as well as that year's American Champion Three-Year-Old Filly Edith Cavell. In the Brooklyn Handicap, Peanuts finished second by a nose to Single Foot, and had another runner-up result in the Brookdale, Thanksgiving, and Merchants and Citizens Handicaps.

=== 1927: five-year-old season ===
In his final year of racing at age five, Peanuts won three more big New York races. He earned victory in the Brookdale Handicap, his second Empire City Handicap, and the most important of 1927, the Brooklyn Handicap. In this mile and one-eighth race, Chance Play took the lead and ran the opening mile in track record time leaving Peanuts two lengths behind. Chance Play increased his lead to five lengths by the time he reached the top of the stretch. Hand ridden by Harold Thurber as they headed for the finish, yard-by-yard Peanuts closed the gap and won by a head. Other star runners behind the two included Display, who would be that year's American Horse of the Year, as well as the 1926 American Horse of the Year and future Hall of Fame inductee, Crusader, plus two other National Champions, Pompey and Black Maria.

== At stud ==
Retired from racing, in 1928 Peanuts stood at his owner's Aknusti Farm in Delaware County, New York.

During his years at stud, Peanuts was the sire of a limited number of offspring, two of which met with racing success. His best was Top Row, a 1931 foal that set two track records, one of which was a world record. Among Top Row's wins were the Massachusetts Handicap and the Narragansett Special in 1935 and in 1936 the Santa Anita Handicap, the then world's richest horse race.

Young Peter was a 1944 foal that raced for Cornelia Gerry, wife of Peanuts' owner. He was also trained by "Maje" Odom. Among Young Peter's stakes successes, in 1947 he won the prestigious Travers Stakes.

== Pedigree ==
Pedigree of Peanuts, bay stallion, 1922
Sire Ambassador IV	Dark Ronald	Bay Ronald	Hampton
Sire Ambassador IV	Dark Ronald	Bay Ronald	Black Duchess
Sire Ambassador IV	Dark Ronald	Darkie	Thurio
Sire Ambassador IV	Dark Ronald	Darkie	Insignia
Sire Ambassador IV	Excellenza	Haut Brion	St. Simon
Sire Ambassador IV	Excellenza	Haut Brion	Bonnie Lassie
Sire Ambassador IV	Excellenza	Gulbeyaz	Bend Or
Sire Ambassador IV	Excellenza	Gulbeyaz	Sultana
Dam Agnes Sard	Sardanapale	Prestige	Le Pompon
Dam Agnes Sard	Sardanapale	Prestige	Orgueilleuse
Dam Agnes Sard	Sardanapale	Gemma	Florizel
Dam Agnes Sard	Sardanapale	Gemma	Agnostic
Dam Agnes Sard	Noreen Agnes	Juggler	Touchet
Dam Agnes Sard	Noreen Agnes	Juggler	Enchantress
Dam Agnes Sard	Noreen Agnes	Red Agnes	Hagioscope
Dam Agnes Sard	Noreen Agnes	Red Agnes	Dolly Agnes (family: 16-c)
