= Harry C. Richards =

American jockey

Harry Richards
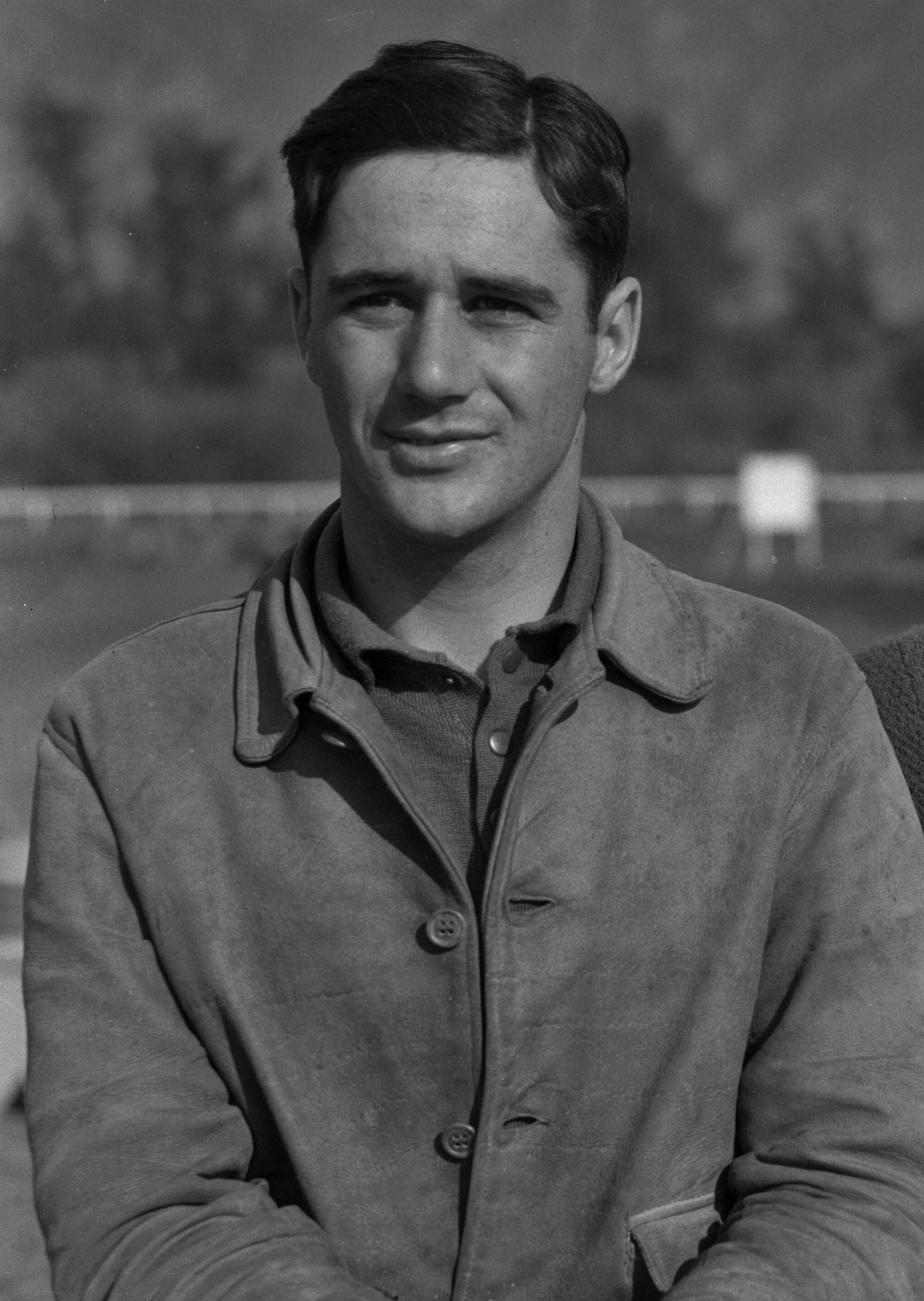
- Richards in 1934

Personal information
- Born: March 24, 1908 Brooklyn, New York, United States
- Died: January 11, 1980 (aged 71) San Diego, California, United States
- Resting place: Eternal Hills Memorial Park, Oceanside, California
- Occupation: Jockey / trainer

Horse racing career
- Sport: Horse racing

Major racing wins
- Cowdin Stakes (1925, 1936); Edgemere Handicap (1925); Walden Stakes (1925); Champlain Handicap (1926); Empire City Handicap (1926); Toboggan Handicap (1926, 1937, 1940, 1941); Dixie Handicap (1928, 1938); Santa Catalina Handicap (1935, 1937); Aberdeen Stakes (1936); Belmont Futurity Stakes (1936); Junior Champion Stakes (1936); Juvenile Stakes (1936); Huron Handicap (1936); Matron Stakes (1936); Narragansett Special (1936); Rowe Memorial Handicap (1936); Suburban Handicap (1936, 1940); American Legion Handicap (1937); Jamaica Handicap (1937); Jockey Club Gold Cup (1937); Paumonok Handicap (1937); Philadelphia Handicap (1937); Santa Anita Handicap (1937); San Antonio Handicap (1937); Schuylerville Stakes (1937); San Juan Capistrano Handicap (1938); Adirondack Stakes (1939); Arlington Classic (1939); Hawthorne Gold Cup Handicap (1939); Travers Stakes (1939); Whitney Handicap (1939); Wilson Stakes (1939, 1940); Flash Stakes (1940); Massachusetts Handicap (1940); Wilson Stakes (1940); Derby Trial Stakes (1941); Metropolitan Handicap (1941)

Significant horses
- Challedon, Eight Thirty, Firethorn, Peanuts, Pompoon

Harry Clayton Richards (March 24, 1908 - January 11, 1980) was an American Thoroughbred horse racing jockey and the first president of the Jockeys' Guild. Hall of Fame jockey Eddie Arcaro said Richards: "was strong in character and who maintained a steady belief in our organization [Jockeys' Guild]. Incidentally, he was one of the greatest riders of my time, the first switch-hitter in our business and the one from whom I copied switch-hitting."

Born in Brooklyn, New York, Richards began riding professionally in 1924. During his career he rode for prominent owners such as Walter Jeffords, George Widener and William duPont Jr. In 1937 he rode duPont's colt Rosemont to victory in the Santa Anita Handicap, defeating Seabiscuit, a scene used in the 2003 motion picture Seabiscuit in which Richards was portrayed by jockey Corey Black.

In 1936, Harry Richards rode Jeome Louchheim's colt Pompoon to victory in the richest and most prestigious race for juveniles, the Futurity Stakes at Belmont Park. Pompoon was voted American Champion Two-Year-Old Colt honors. In 1937, he rode Pompoon to a second-place finish in the Kentucky Derby to War Admiral, finishing a length and a half back.

Among his other top grade horses, Richards was the regular jockey for George Widener's future Hall of Fame inductee Eight Thirty on whom he won the 1939 Travers Stakes, the 1940 Suburban Handicap and in his final year as a jockey, the Metropolitan Handicap.

In 1940, Harry Richards was a founding member of the Jockeys' Guild and served as the organization's first president.

Retired from riding, Harry Richards owned and trained horses for several years. He and his wife Daisy were living in Solana Beach, California when he died at age seventy-two in January 1980.
