= Vincentive =

American-bred Thoroughbred racehorse

- Sire: Challenger
- Grandsire: Swynford
- Dam: Phenomenon
- Damsire: Scotch Broom
- Sex: Stallion
- Foaled: 1940
- Country: United States
- Colour: Bay
- Breeder: William L. Brann
- Owner: William L. Brann
- Trainer: Edward A. Christmas

Major wins
- Dwyer Stakes (1943)

Vincentive (foaled 1940) was an American Thoroughbred racehorse from Maryland who won the 55th running of the Dwyer Stakes at Belmont Park on June 19, 1943. Owned by William Leavitt Brann, the colt defeated Famous Victory, owned by Mrs. Payne Whitney. Vincentive was ridden by jockey Johnny Gilbert, who weighed 111 pounds. The win was worth $19,600.

A son of Challenger (Great Britain) and Phenomenon (United States), the thoroughbred attained career earnings of $36,935. In 16 starts he had 5 wins, 2 places, and 4 shows. He won by seven lengths as a juvenile in the October 10, 1942 Maryland Futurity. The $5,000 race was held at Laurel Park Racecourse. Ridden by George Woolf, Vincentive ran the six furlongs in record time for the stake, 1:11 3/5. This was merely 4/5 of a second behind the track record held by Star Porter. Vincentive earned $4,290.

In 1943 Vincentive skipped the Kentucky Derby and prepared for the Preakness Stakes. He won a six furlong event at Pimlico Race Course on May 3, 1943, defeating Noonday Sun. In the 53rd running of the Preakness, on May 8, 1943, Vincentive finished a disappointing 3rd to winner Count Fleet and second place Blue Swords. Before 29,381 spectators, Count Fleet's time of 1:57 2/5 did not eclipse the record of 1:56 2/5 set by Riverland in the Dixie Handicap, run at Pimlico a week earlier.
