= McLennan Handicap =

Discontinued American horse race

- Class: Discontinued stakes
- Location: Hialeah Park Race Track; Hialeah, Florida, United States
- Inaugurated: 1934
- Race type: Thoroughbred - Flat racing

Race information
- Distance: 1 1/8 miles (9 furlongs)
- Surface: Dirt
- Track: left-handed
- Qualification: Three-years-old & up
- Weight: Assigned

The McLennan Handicap was an American thoroughbred horse race run annually each February from 1934–1961 at Hialeah Park Race Track in Hialeah, Florida. First run in 1934 as the Joseph McLennan Memorial Handicap, the race was named In honor of the late Joseph "Sandy" McLennan, the former racing secretary at Hialeah Park and at Chicago's Arlington Park who died in December 1933. In winning the first edition in 1934, Col. Edward R. Bradley's Blessed Event equaled the world record for a mile and an eighth on dirt. In 1938 the race name was shortened to the McLennan Memorial Handicap and shortened again in 1948 to the McLennan Handicap.

In 1941 the race had twenty-five entries and had to be run in two divisions.

== Records ==
Speed record:

- Spartan Valor - 1:47.20

Most wins by a jockey:

- 2 - James Stout (1938, 1952)
- 2 - Ted Atkinson (1944, 1949)

Most wins by a trainer:

- 5 - Horace A. Jones (1947, 1949, 1958, 1960, 1961)

Most wins by an owner:

- 6 - Calumet Farm (1944, 1947, 1949, 1958, 1960, 1961)

== Winners ==
Year	Winner	Age	Jockey	Trainer	Owner	Dist. (Miles)	Time
1961	Yorky	4	Johnny Sellers	Horace A. Jones	Calumet Farm	1 1/8 m.	1:48.00
1960	On-and-On	4	Steve Brooks	Horace A. Jones	Calumet Farm	1 1/8 m.	1:48.80
1959	Sharpsburg	6	Howard Grant	Tony Puglisi	Roy E. Faircloth	1 1/8 m.	1:49.00
1958	Iron Liege	4	Bill Hartack	Horace A. Jones	Calumet Farm	1 1/8 m.	1:48.00
1957	Summer Tan	5	David Erb	Sherrill W. Ward	Dorothy Firestone Galbreath	1 1/8 m.	1:48.80
1956	Switch On	5	Bobby Ussery	John A. Nerud	Gerald S. Colella	1 1/8 m.	1:49.40
1955	Social Outcast	5	Eric Guerin	William C. Winfrey	Alfred G. Vanderbilt II	1 1/8 m.	1:49.40
1954	Elixir	6	Sam Boulmetis	David J. Schneider	David J. Schneider	1 1/8 m.	1:49.00
1953	Crafty Admiral	5	Kenneth Church	Robert B. Odom	Charfran Stable (Charles & Frances Cohen)	1 1/8 m.	1:53.40
1952	Spartan Valor	4	James Stout	Frank Catrone	William G. Helis Jr.	1 1/8 m.	1:47.20
1951	Gangway	6	Logan Batcheller	Paul L. Kelley	Paul L. Kelley	1 1/8 m.	1:49.40
1950	Three Rings	5	Hedley Woodhouse	Willie Knapp	Evelyn L. Hopkins	1 1/8 m.	1:50.20
1949	Coaltown	4	Ted Atkinson	Horace A. Jones	Calumet Farm	1 1/8 m.	1:48.40
1948	El Mono	4	Porter Roberts	Roscoe Troxler	Daniel Lamont	1 1/8 m.	1:48.40
1947	Armed	6	Douglas Dodson	Horace A. Jones	Calumet Farm	1 1/8 m.	1:50.00
1946	Concordian	4	Joe Renick	Robert B. Odom	Barney A. Murphy	1 1/8 m.	1:48.60
1945	Race not held						
1944	Sun Again	5	Ted Atkinson	Ben A. Jones	Calumet Farm	1 1/8 m.	1:52.20
1943	Race not held						
1942	Market Wise	4	Wendell Eads	George Carroll	Louis Tufano	1 1/8 m.	1:50.80
1941	Haltal	4	Conn McCreary	Steve Judge	Woodvale Farm	1 1/8 m.	1:49.00
1941	Big Pebble	5	George Seabo	William B. Finnegan	Circle M Ranch	1 1/8 m.	1:48.80
1940	Many Stings	5	Ruperto Donoso	Mose Shapoff	Leo J. Marks	1 1/8 m.	1:50.60
1939	Stagehand	4	Jack Westrope	Earl Sande	H. Maxwell Howard	1 1/8 m.	1:48.20
1938	Piccolo	5	James Stout	Walter A. Carter	R. A. Moore	1 1/8 m.	1:50.60
1937	Finance	5	Charles Kurtsinger	Bert S. Michell	Mrs. Emil Denemark	1 1/8 m.	1:48.80
1936	Sablin	4	John Longden	Frank Gilpin	Edward F. Seagram	1 1/8 m.	1:49.20
1935	Stand Pat	4	John Gilbert	Frank Gilpin	Edward F. Seagram	1 1/8 m.	1:49.20
1934	Blessed Event	3	Don Meade	Herbert J. Thompson	Edward R. Bradley	1 1/8 m.	1:48.40
