= Pimlico Spring Handicap =

Horses run

- Class: Discontinued
- Location: Pimlico Race Course; Baltimore, Maryland, USA
- Inaugurated: 1917–1932
- Race type: Thoroughbred - Flat racing

Race information
- Distance: 1 1/16 miles (8.5 furlongs)
- Surface: Dirt
- Track: left-handed
- Qualification: Three-year-olds & up

The Pimlico Spring Handicap was a race for Thoroughbred horses run annually from 1917 through 1932 at Pimlico Race Course racetrack in Baltimore, Maryland. The mile and one-sixteenth race on dirt was open to horses of either sex age three and older.

== Historic notes ==
For most of its duration, the event attracted top-level horses such as inaugural winner Pennant, the 1913 Belmont Futurity winner and sire of U.S. Racing Hall of Fame inductee, Equipoise. Others include 1918 winner Cudgel, who beat that year's American Champion Older Male Horse, Omar Khayyam. In 1921 Sandy Beal won the Pimlico Spring Handicap beating 1920 Kentucky Derby winner Paul Jones, and 1922 winner Exterminator had already won a Kentucky Derby and by the time he retired from racing had been named a five-time Champion as well as a U.S. Racing Hall of Fame inductee.

The Pimlico Spring Handicap was a victim of the Great Depression in the United States which brought much consolidation of races at every track and a dramatic reduction in purse money.

== Records ==
Speed record: (at 1 1/16 miles)

- 1:45 0/0 - Edisto (1926)

Most wins by a jockey:

- 2 - Fred Stevens (1924, 1930)

Most wins by a trainer:

- 2 - H. Guy Bedwell (1918, 1920)

Most wins by an owner:

- 2 - Harry Payne Whitney (1917, 1923)
- 2 - J. K. L. Ross (1918, 1920)

== Winners ==
Year	Winner	Age	Jockey	Trainer	Owner	Dist. (Miles)	Time	Win$
1932	Sun Meadow	4	Jimmy Smith	Thomas D. Rodrock	Katherine E. Hitt	11/16 M	1:51.20	$2,910
1931	Frisius	5	Anthony Pascuma	George Tappen	Belair Stud	11/16 M	1:47.60	$2,750
1930	Grey Coat	4	Fred Stevens	J. Woods Garth	Samuel Ross	1 M, 70 yds	1:43.80	$7,280
1929	Sortie	4	Pete Walls	Max Hirsch	A. Charles Schwartz	11/16 M	1:46.60	$7,230
1928	Canter	5	Steve O'Donnell	Harry Rites	J. Edwin Griffith	11/16 M	1:46.20	$7,430
1927	Dangerous	5	Edgar Barnes	Walter A. Carter	Rosedale Stable	11/16 M	1:47.20	$7,100
1926	Edisto	4	Henry Erickson	William H. Bringloe	Seagram Stables	11/16 M	1:45.00	$6,900
1925	General Thatcher	5	Louis Schaefer	Preston M. Burch	Nevada Stock Farm	11/16 M	1:45.20	$6,070
1924	Spot Cash	4	Fred Stevens	James W. Healy	Albert C. Bostwick	11/16 M	1:48.00	$6,150
1923	Bunting	4	Linus McAtee	James G. Rowe Sr.	Harry Payne Whitney	11/16 M	1:45.40	$6,250
1922	Exterminator	7	Albert Johnson	Eugene Wayland	Willis Sharpe Kilmer	11/16 M	1:45.80	$3,650
1921	Sandy Beal	4	Steve Wida	Robert B. Jackson	W. S. Murray	11/16 M	1:52.00	$3,650
1920	Boniface	5	Earl Sande	H. Guy Bedwell	J. K. L. Ross	11/16 M	1:46.80	$3,650
1919	Royce Rools	4	Tommy Nolan	Andrew G. Blakely	Thomas H. Cross	11/16 M	1:48.40	$3,650
1918	Cudgel	4	Lawrence Lyke	H. Guy Bedwell	J. K. L. Ross	1 M, 70 yds	1:43.40	$4,150
1917	Pennant	6	Frank Robinson	Albert Simons	Harry Payne Whitney	1 M, 70 yds	1:46.00	$2,200
