= Inspector B =

American-bred Thoroughbred racehorse

- Sire: Enquirer
- Grandsire: Leamington
- Dam: Colossa
- Damsire: Colossus
- Sex: Stallion
- Foaled: 1883
- Country: United States
- Breeder: William Giles Harding
- Owner: Dwyer Brothers
- Trainer: James G. Rowe Sr. Frank McCabe

Major wins
- Tidal Stakes (1886); Harvest Handicap (1886); Lorillard Stakes (1886); United States Hotel Stakes (1886); Travers Stakes (1886); Bay Ridge Handicap (1889); Brookdale Handicap (1889); Lawnview Handicap (1889) American Classics wins: Belmont Stakes (1886)
- Last updated on March 8, 2022

Inspector B was an American Thoroughbred racehorse best known for winning the 1886 Belmont Stakes.

== Background ==
Inspector B was bred at Belle Meade Stud in Tennessee by William Giles Harding. His sire was Enquirer, and his dam was Colossa. He was previously registered as Envoleur, but his name was later changed to Inspector B. He was named after the head of the New York City Police Department detective department, Thomas F. Byrnes. He was later sold to the Dwyer Brothers, Philip J. Dwyer and Michael F. Dwyer.

== Racing career ==
As a two-year-old, Inspector B came second in the August Stakes, the Champagne Stakes, and the Great Eastern Handicap.

At age three, Inspector B ran in the Belmont alongside another horse owned by the Dwyer Brothers, Buffalo. Buffalo's purpose was to act as a rabbit, setting the pace early in hopes of tiring out other horses and allowing Inspector B to win. The horse to beat was The Bard, who'd won that year's Preakness Stakes. Inspector B was sent off as the favorite, with The Bard as a second choice. During the race, Buffalo set a quick pace, which The Bard matched at first, taking the lead. Towards the end of the race, Buffalo started to tire, and Inspector B took the lead. The Bard almost caught up with him with a furlong to go, but ultimately lost. Inspector B won the race by a length, beating four other horses.

11 days after his victory in the Belmont, Inspector B won the Tidal Stakes. During the rest of the season, he won the Harvest Handicap, the Lorillard Stakes, the United States Hotel Stakes, and the Travers Stakes. He came second in the Green Grass Stakes and the Coney Island Derby, and came third in the Sequel Stakes.

Inspector B continued racing for several more years. At age six, he won the Bay Ridge Handicap, the Brookdale Handicap, and the Lawnview Handicap. He also came second in the Green Grass Stakes.

== Later life ==
Following the 1889 season, Inspector B was retired to stud, where he had a respectable career. In 1907, he was sold to a farmer for $15 after his owner deemed him no longer useful. The farmer stated he intended to geld Inspector B and use him to plow his crops.

== Pedigree ==
Pedigree of Inspector B
Sire Enquirer 1867	Leamington 1853	Faugh-a-Ballagh	Sir Hercules
Sire Enquirer 1867	Leamington 1853	Faugh-a-Ballagh	Guiccioli
Sire Enquirer 1867	Leamington 1853	Pantaloon Mare	Pantaloon
Sire Enquirer 1867	Leamington 1853	Pantaloon Mare	Daphne
Sire Enquirer 1867	Lida 1858	Lexington	Boston
Sire Enquirer 1867	Lida 1858	Lexington	Alice Carneal
Sire Enquirer 1867	Lida 1858	Lize	American Eclipse*
Sire Enquirer 1867	Lida 1858	Lize	Gabriella
Dam Colossa 1869	Colossus 1856	Sovereign*	Emilius*
Dam Colossa 1869	Colossus 1856	Sovereign*	Fleur-de-lis*
Dam Colossa 1869	Colossus 1856	Sister One to Pryor	Glencoe
Dam Colossa 1869	Colossus 1856	Sister One to Pryor	Gipsy*
Dam Colossa 1869	Rurica 1861	Ruric	Sovereign*
Dam Colossa 1869	Rurica 1861	Ruric	Levity
Dam Colossa 1869	Rurica 1861	Eleanor Margrave	Margrave
Dam Colossa 1869	Rurica 1861	Eleanor Margrave	Fanny Wright

* Inspector B is inbred 3D x 4D to the stallion Sovereign, meaning that he appears third generation and fourth generation on the dam side of his pedigree.

* Inspector B is inbred 4S x 5D to the stallion American Eclipse, meaning that he appears fourth generation on the sire side of his pedigree, and fifth generation (via Gypsy) on the dam side of his pedigree.
