= Lafayette Stakes =

- Class: Non-graded Stakes
- Location: Keeneland Race Course; Lexington, Kentucky, United States
- Inaugurated: 1937
- Race type: Thoroughbred - Flat racing
- Website: www.keeneland.com

Race information
- Distance: 7 furlongs
- Surface: dirt
- Track: left-handed
- Qualification: Three-year-olds
- Weight: Assigned
- Purse: $400,000

The Lafayette Stakes is an American Thoroughbred horse race run annually at Keeneland Race Course in Lexington, Kentucky. Open to three-year-old horses, it is contested on the dirt track over a distance of seven furlongs. There is a Lafayette Stakes horse race for three year olds run at six furlongs at in on Evangeline Downs dirt Race Track.

A Listed race from 1983 through 1989, it was elevated to a Grade III event in 1990 then modified to a non-graded status for 2006.

Since inception, the Lafayette Stakes has been raced at a variety of distances:

- 40 feet less than 4 furlongs : 1937–1942, 1946–1953
- 4 1/2 furlongs : 1943–1944, 1965–1981
- 4 furlongs, 152 feet : 1954–1964
- 6 furlongs : 1982–1985, 2005–2006
- 7 furlongs : 1986–2004, 2007 to present

The Lafayette Stakes was run in two divisions in 1951, 1952, 1958, 1959, 1960, and 1968.

Due to wartime restrictions, the race was hosted by Churchill Downs in 1943 and 1944. There was no race run in 1945.

Two horses set new Keeneland course records in winning this race: Mals Boy in 1950 and Loom in 1964.

== Records ==
Speed record: (at current distance of 7 furlongs)

- 1:21.05 - Carnack's Choice (2007) on Polytrack
- 1:21.20 - Cherokee Run (1993) (on dirt)

Most wins by a jockey

- 4 - Pat Day (1988, 1992, 1993, 2002)

Most wins by a trainer

- 4 - Anthony L. Basile (1967, 1971, 1979, 1983)

Most wins by an owner

- 5 - Bwamazon Farm (1967, 1971, 1977, 1979, 1983)

== Winners ==
Year	Winner	Jockey	Trainer	Owner	Time
2025	Colloquial	Manuel Franco	George Weaver	Harrell Ventures & Starlight Racing	1:23.92
2024	Glengarry	Luis Saez	Doug L. Anderson	Aaron Kennedy, Toby Joseph & Doug L. Anderson	1:22.91
2023	Corona Bolt	Florent Geroux	Brad H. Cox	Stonestreet Stables	1:23.21
2022	Old Homestead	Thomas L. Pompell	Brett A. Brinkman	Marablue Farm & Pegasus Stud	1:22.98
2021	Race not held				
2020	Sleepy Eyes Todd	Joel Rosario	Miguel Angel Silva	Thumbs Up Racing	1:21.77
2016 - 2019	Race not held				
2015	Falling Sky	Julien Leparoux	Martin D. Wolfson	Newtown Anner Stud & Joseph Bulger	1:22.53
2009 - 2014	Race not held				
2008	Keep Laughing	John R. Velazquez	Kiaran McLaughlin	Vision Racing LLC	1:22.26
2007	Carnack's Choice	Julien Leparoux	Gregory D. Foley	Sassafras Racing I, LLC	1:21.05
2006	Likely	Julien Leparoux	Patrick Biancone	Maurice Miller III & Thomas F. Van Meter II	1:09.32
2005	More Smoke	Clinton Potts	John C. Zimmerman	Thomas McClay & Harry Nye	1:09.88
2004	Bwana Charlie	Shane Sellers	Steven M. Asmussen	Heiligbrodt Racing Stable	1:24.73
2003	Posse	Corey Lanerie	Steven M. Asmussen	Heiligbrodt Racing Stable	1:23.14
2002	Cashel Castle	Pat Day	Chris M. Block	Sandbar Farms (William Kilgore)	1:24.47
2001	Griffinite	José A. Santos	Jennifer Pedersen	Paraneck Stable	1:22.61
2000	Caller One	Robbie Davis	James K. Chapman	Theresa McArthur & Carolyn M. Chapman	1:21.73
1999	Yes It's True	Jerry Bailey	D. Wayne Lukas	Padua Stables	1:22.15
1998	Dontletthebigonego	Willie Martinez	Richard Suttle	Paraneck Stable	1:23.00
1997	Trafalger	Jerry Bailey	D. Wayne Lukas	Beverly Lewis & Robert Lewis	1:21.60
1996	Wire Me Collect	Kristi Chapman	Kim Chapman	Arthur I. Appleton	1:21.80
1995	Mr. Greeley	Julie Krone	Nick Zito	William J. Condren & Joseph M. Cornacchia	1:21.40
1994	Exclusive Praline	José A. Santos	Steve Towne	Frank C. Calabrese	1:23.80
1993	Cherokee Run	Pat Day	Frank A. Alexander	Jill Robinson	1:21.20
1992	American Chance	Pat Day	Niall O'Callaghan	John D. Gunther	1:22.00
1991	To Freedom	Chris Antley	John Tammaro Jr.	Herman Heinlein & Prestonwood Farm	1:22.80
1990	Housebuster	Craig Perret	Warren A. Croll Jr.	Robert P. Levy	1:22.80
1989	Belek	Shane Romero	Louie J. Roussel III	Louie J. Roussel III	1:23.00
1988	Forty Niner	Pat Day	Woody Stephens	Claiborne Farm	1:22.00
1987	Trick Card	Donald Miller Jr.	Del W. Carroll II	William S. Farish & E. J. Hudson Jr.	1:23.80
1986	Numero Uno Pass	Craig Perret	James J. Crupi	Joel Sharenow	1:23.60
1985	Proudest Hour	Randy Romero	Joseph M. Bollero	Patrick J. Flavin et al.	1:10.80
1984	Delta Trace	Keith Allen	Harold Jordan Jr.	Harold Jordan	1:10.40
1983	Freezing Rain	Don Brumfield	Anthony L. Basile	Bwamazon Farm	1:11.20
1982	Jungle Blade	Jack Neagle	Richard P. Hazelton	M/M Robert Bensinger	1:10.20
1981	Grey Bucket	John Oldham	Magnus A. Fairley	Akuma Stable	0:53.20
1980	Firm Boss	Michael Morgan	James E. Morgan	George Steinbrenner	0:53.00
1979	Raised Socially	Michael Morgan	Anthony L. Basile	Bwamazon Farm	0:52.20
1978	Spy Charger	Gary Mahon	John Vass	M/M John Vass	0:53.20
1977	Fiddle Faddle †	William Gavidia	William R. O'Neill	Bwamazon Farm	0:52.80
1976	United Holme	William Gavidia	Robert E. Holthus	Robert E. Holthus	0:52.00
1975	Inca Roca	Terry Warner	Albert T. "Tom" Skinner	Charles Raymond Jarrell	0:52.80
1974	Paris Dust	Craig Perret	Smiley Adams	Golden Chance Farm	0:51.00
1973	Mr. A.Z.	Bobby Ussery	Thomas Heard Jr.	Ben Cohen	0:52.60
1972	Cari County	Phil Rubbicco	H. W. Shadowens	T. Alie & J. E. Grissom	0:52.00
1971	Busted	Mickey Solomone	Anthony L. Basile	Bwamazon Farm	0:51.60
1970	Seen A lot	Mike Manganello	Thomas Stevens Sr.	Mrs. William H. May	0:53.00
1969	Spotted Line	David Whited	Dewey Smith	T. Alie & J. E. Grissom	0:51.80
1968	Santiago Road	Kenny Knapp	Harry Trotsek	Hasty House Farm	0:52.00
1968	Traffic Mark	Mike McDowell	Ronnie Warren	M/M Robert F. Roberts	0:52.60
1967	T.V. Commercial	Kenny Knapp	Anthony L. Basile	Bwamazon Farm	0:52.00
1966	Quick Swoon	Earlie Fires	S. Bryant Ott	E. Gay Drake	0:51.40
1965	He Jr.	Jack Fieselman	Dick Posey	Everett Lowrance	0:52.00
1964	Loom	Jimmy Nichols	Burton B. Williams	Hugh A. Grant	0:48.00
1963	Amastar	Jimmy Nichols	Norman A. McMaster	Grace Creek Farm	0:48.20
1962	Dontstopnow	Melvin Duhon	L. G. Culver	M/M J. D. Askew	0:48.60
1961	Crimson Satan	Willie Carstens	Gordon R. Potter	Crimson King Farm	0:49.00
1960	Bright Silver	John L. Rotz	John J. Greely Jr.	C. V. Whitney	0:49.60
1960	Sal's Beau	Braulio Baeza	Frank A. Kurinec	Harold M. Florsheim	0:48.80
1959	Vital Force	Johnny Sellers	Wilma Kennedy	Tinkham Veale II et al.	0:49.00
1959	Chuckabuck	William Hartack	Chester F. Bowles	Chester F. Bowles	0:49.80
1958	Grand Wizard	Vidal Guajardo	Monte Preston	E. H. Lane	0:50.80
1958	Bagdad	John Heckmann	Moody Jolley	Claiborne Farm	0:50.60
1957	Bumpy Road	William Hartack	Edwin P. Anspach	Mrs. Irving Gushen	0:48.40
1956	Round stable	Steve Brooks	Moody Jolley	Claiborne Farm	0:49.60
1955	First Lap	Job Dean Jessop	Milt Resseguet	R. A. Lewis	0:50.00
1954	Royal Note	Henry E. Moreno	Frank Gilpin	Wilton Stable	0:49.40
1953	Everett Jr.	Al Popara	Dick Posey	Everett Lowrance	0:45.40
1952-1	Happy Carrier	Gerald Porch	Robert A. Mattingly	William H. Veeneman	0:46.00
1952-2	Aerolite	Douglas Dodson	Dee Brooks	Hal Price Headley	0:45.80
1951	Recover	Douglas Dodson	Dee Brooks	Hal Price Headley	0:46.60
1951	Crownlet	Robert L. Baird	Duval A. Headley	Duval A. Headley	0:46.60
1950	Mals Boy	Job Dean Jessop	Robert V. McGarvey	Mrs. Emil Denemark	0:45.40
1949	Black Sambo	Robert L. Baird	William J. Resseguet Jr.	Mrs. Samuel Rosen	0:47.40
1948	Irish Sun	Andy LoTurco	Warren G. Douglass	William H. Veeneman	0:46.20
1947	Phar Mon	Andy LoTurco	Warren G. Douglass	William H. Veeneman	0:46.20
1946	Colonel O'F	William Bailey	William R. Crump	Claude C. Tanner	0:46.40
1945	Race not held				
1944	Poco Mas	George Seabo	W. M. McClain	Bluebird Stock Farm	0:53.80
1943	Ogham	Johnny Longden	Burton B. Williams	Mrs. Helen Miller	0:54.80
1942	Menex	Eddie Arcaro	Allen R. Hultz	Louis Lee Haggin II	0:46.60
1941	Black Raider	Arthur Craig	Roy Waldron	Milky Way Farm Stable	0:46.40
1940	Misty Isle	Ken McCombs	Daniel E. Stewart	Joseph E. Widener	0:47.00
1939	Roman	Warren Yarberry	Daniel E. Stewart	Joseph E. Widener	0:47.60
1938	Oddessa Beulah	Melvin Calvert	C. Hyde Smith	Oddessa Farms	0:46.00
1937	Chic Maud	Irving Anderson	Frank J. Kearns	Calumet Farm	0:47.20

- Run in two divisions in 1952.
* † In 1977, Forever Casting won the race but was disqualified from first and set back to last.
