= Hilton Dabson =

American jockey and racehorse trainer

Personal information
- Born: April 8, 1912 Greensboro, Maryland, United States
- Died: June 16, 1984 (aged 72) Hollywood, Florida, United States
- Resting place: Greensboro Cemetery, Greensboro, Maryland
- Occupations: Jockey, Trainer

Horse racing career
- Sport: Horse racing

Major racing wins
- Jockey wins: Hialeah Turf Cup Handicap (1937); Narragansett Special (1937) ) Phoenix Handicap (1937) ) Delaware Oaks (1939) ) Jennings Handicap (1939) ) Pimlico Nursery Stakes (1939); Rowe Memorial Handicap (1939) Trainer wins: Fountain of Youth Handicap (1955); Hutcheson Handicap (1955); Peter Pan Handicap (1955); Swift Stakes (1955); Vosburgh Handicap (1955); Paumonok Handicap (1956); Toboggan Handicap (1956)

Racing awards
- Rockingham Park Leading Rider (1933)

Significant horses
- Horses (Jockey): Calumet Dick, White Cockade; Horses (trainer): Nance's Ace, Nance's Lad

Hilton Alexander Dabson (April 8, 1912 – June 16, 1984) was an American Thoroughbred horse racing jockey and racehorse trainer. In 1933, he was the leading rider at Rockingham Park.

On September 11, 1937, Dabson rode Calumet Dick to victory in the Narragansett Special. A horse that usually ran well on muddy tracks, he bested Wheatley Stable's Snark and national superstar Seabiscuit over a sloppy track at Narragansett Park to win the rich $28,200 race.

He also won the 1937 Phoenix Handicap at Keeneland Race Course on Preeminent for Hal Price Headley. Eventually, weight gain forced him to become a trainer of racehorses. The best horse that he trained was seven-time stakes winner Nance's Lad. Dabson was the rare combination of breeder/owner/trainer, and Nance's Lad won the Fountain of Youth Stakes, Swift Stakes and Peter Pan Stakes. On March 9, 1955, Nance's Lad won the Hutcheson Handicap at Gulfstream Park in track record time of 1:16 2/5 for 6 1/2 furlongs. On May 14, 1956, his winning time of 1:08 2/5 in the Toboggan Handicap set a new Belmont Park track record for six furlongs on dirt.

Dabson also trained Nance's Ace who won the feature race at Tropical Park Race Track on December 27, 1944, in the fast time of 1:03 1/5.

A native of Greensboro, Maryland, he moved to Florida in 1955 and later became a charter member of the Florida Thoroughbred Breeders and Owners Association.

Hilton Dabson died at age 72 on June 16, 1984, at Memorial Hospital in Hollywood, Florida.
