= Hurry to Market =

American-bred Thoroughbred racehorse

- Sire: To Market
- Grandsire: Market Wise
- Dam: Hasty Girl
- Damsire: Princequillo
- Sex: Stallion
- Foaled: 1961
- Country: United States
- Colour: Bay
- Breeder: Louise Clements
- Owner: Roger Wilson & Mrs. T. P. Hull, Jr.
- Trainer: David Erb
- Record: 7: 3-2-2
- Earnings: $204,129

Major wins
- Garden State Stakes (1963)

Awards
- TRA & DRF American Champion Two-Year-Old Colt (1963)

Hurry to Market (foaled 1961 in Kentucky) was an American Champion Thoroughbred racehorse. He was voted American Champion Two-Year-Old Colt in 1963, but his career was ended by injury before he could run again.

== Background ==
Bred by Louise Clements, he was out of Hasty Girl, a daughter of two-time Leading sire in North America, Princequillo. His sire was To Market, a multiple top stakes race winner who set several track records and whose sire, Market Wise, was the 1943 American Co-Champion Older Male Horse.

Hurry to Market was purchased at the Keeneland Sales by New Orleans oilman and Fair Grounds Hall of Fame inductee Roger Wilson and the daughter of his business partner, Mrs. T. P. Hull Jr. He was trained by former jockey David Erb.

== Racing career ==
His strong juvenile season was capped off in a major race for two-year-olds in mid-November when he defeated Roman Brother in winning the Garden State Stakes and then survived a protest from John L. Rotz, the rider of the runner-up. Never finishing worse than third, Hurry to Market was voted 1963 American Champion Two-Year-Old Colt by the Daily Racing Form and the Thoroughbred Racing Association. The rival Turf & Sports Digest poll was topped by Raise a Native.

Going into the 1964 racing season, Hurry to Market was rated at 125 pounds on the Experimental Free Handicap, ahead of Northern Dancer, who was assigned 123 pounds. With Raise a Native retired due to injury, Hurry to Market was the early favorite for the Kentucky Derby. However, in January 1964 the colt sustained a quarter crack in his right hind hoof that ended his racing career.

== Stud record ==
Retired to stud duty, Hurry to Market met with limited success but did sire multiple stakes winner, A Letter to Harry.
