= Market Wise =

American-bred Thoroughbred racehorse

- Sire: Brokers Tip
- Grandsire: Black Toney
- Dam: On Hand
- Damsire: On Watch
- Sex: Stallion
- Foaled: 1938
- Country: United States
- Colour: Bay
- Breeder: Cary T. Grayson
- Owner: Louis Tufano
- Trainer: George W. Carroll
- Record: 53: 19-7-10
- Earnings: US$222,140

Major wins
- Wood Memorial (1941); Jockey Club Gold Cup (1941); Gallant Fox Handicap (1941); Governor Bowie Handicap (1941); Edgemere Handicap (1941); Pimlico Special (1941); McLennan Handicap (1942); Suburban Handicap (1942); Narragansett Special (1943); Massachusetts Handicap (1943)

Awards
- TSD American Champion Older Male Horse (1943)

Market Wise (foaled 1938 in Virginia) was an American Champion Thoroughbred racehorse.

== Background ==
Bred by Cary T. Grayson, Market Wise was out of On Hand, and his sire was the 1933 Kentucky Derby winner, Brokers Tip. He was purchased by New York contractor Louis Tufano for $1,000. He was trained by George W. Carroll.

== Racing career ==
=== 1940 & 1941: early career ===
Market Wise raced in 1940 at age two with little success. Going into the April 26, 1941, Wood Memorial Stakes, the then three-year-old had earned only $4,975, but he upset the favorite, King Cole, to win with a come-from-behind stretch drive. Flush with over $16,000 in winnings from the race, owner Louis Tufano hired a private railcar to transport his horse to Louisville, Kentucky to run in the Derby. Market Wise ran third to winner Whirlaway in the 1941 Kentucky Derby and second to him in the Dwyer Stakes. He later defeated Whirlaway in the 1941 Jockey Club Gold Cup while setting a new American record for two miles. The colt went on to win the Gallant Fox Handicap and on September 6 set a new Aqueduct Racetrack track record in winning the 1 1/8 miles (1.8 km) Edgemere Handicap. On October 30, 1941, Market Wise earned his most important win of the year in the Pimlico Special under regular jockey Wendell Eads. Two weeks later, on the same Pimlico Race Course, he won the one and five eights mile Governor Bowie Handicap in track-record time. In the balloting for 1941 American Champion Three-Year-Old Male Horse honors, Market Wise finished second to U.S. Triple Crown winner, Whirlaway.

=== 1942: four-year-old season ===
Sent to Florida for the 1941-1942 winter season, Market Wise finished fourth in the January 1942 Kendall Purse at seven furlongs. Hampered by a foot injury, he then finished third in the Hialeah Stakes. In February 1942, he beat a top field in the important McLennan Handicap at Hialeah Park Race Track. He won again a week later on February 29 and then finished off the board as the heavy favorite in the March 8th Widener Challenge Cup Handicap, the most important race for older horses during the Florida winter season.

Returning north for the summer racing season, Market Wise defeated Whirlaway in the 1942 Suburban Handicap.

=== 1943: five-year-old season ===
Market Wise raced at age five in 1943. On the way to being voted American Co-Champion Older Male Horse, he won the Massachusetts Handicap and the Narragansett Special. In the Massachusetts Handicap in July, Market Wise carried top weight of 126 pounds and won with an "amazing last-minute burst" in a stakes record of 1:52.6 despite sustaining a "spread foot". Two months later in the Narragansett Special, he produced a powerful late run to catch Air Master in the closing stages, with Thumbs Up third and Shut Out fourth. He returned to the winners' circle limping badly after sustaining a quarter crack.

In December, Market Wise, described as "Mr. Rags to Riches," topped the annual poll of writers and broadcasters conducted by Turf and Sports Digest magazine for the title of American Champion Older Male Horse with 176 points, ahead of Thumbs Up (171), Shut Out (154), and Devil Diver (138). The rival Daily Racing Form award went to Devil Diver.

== Stud record ==
Retired to stud, Market Wise met with modest success as a stallion. In addition to multiple stakes winner Wise Margin, he sired To Market, a colt who in 1952 set two track records for 1 1/4 miles (2.0 km) with a time of 2:01.40 in both the Massachusetts Handicap at Suffolk Downs in Boston and the Hawthorne Gold Cup Handicap at Hawthorne Race Course in Chicago. To Market sired Hurry to Market, the 1963 American Co-Champion Two-Year-Old Colt.

== Sire line tree ==
- Market Wise
  - To Market
    - High Bid
    - Oink
    - Viking Spirit
    - Hurry to Market
      - A Letter To Harry
    - Rising Market
  - Wise Margin

== Pedigree ==
Pedigree of Market Wise
Sire Brokers Tip	Black Toney	Peter Pan	Commando*
Sire Brokers Tip	Black Toney	Peter Pan	Cinderella
Sire Brokers Tip	Black Toney	Belgravia	Ben Brush*
Sire Brokers Tip	Black Toney	Belgravia	Bonnie Gal
Sire Brokers Tip	Forteresse	Sardanapale	Prestige
Sire Brokers Tip	Forteresse	Sardanapale	Gemma
Sire Brokers Tip	Forteresse	Guerriere	Ossian
Sire Brokers Tip	Forteresse	Guerriere	Amazone
Dam On Hand	On Watch	Colin	Commando*
Dam On Hand	On Watch	Colin	Pastorella
Dam On Hand	On Watch	Rubia Granda	Greenan
Dam On Hand	On Watch	Rubia Granda	The Great Ruby
Dam On Hand	Kippy	Broomstick	Ben Brush*
Dam On Hand	Kippy	Broomstick	Elf
Dam On Hand	Kippy	Seamstress	Star Shoot
Dam On Hand	Kippy	Seamstress	Busy Maid

* Market Wise is inbred 4S x 4D to the stallion Commando, meaning that he appears fourth generation on the sire side of his pedigree, and fourth generation on the dam side of his pedigree.

* Market Wise is inbred 4S x 4D to the stallion Ben Brush, meaning that he appears fourth generation on the sire side of his pedigree, and fourth generation on the dam side of his pedigree.
