= Harold Thurber =

American jockey

Personal information
- Born: November 23, 1892 North Dakota, United States
- Died: July 27, 1968 (aged 75) San Diego, California, United States
- Occupation: Jockey

Horse racing career
- Sport: Horse racing

Major racing wins
- Quickstep Handicap (1917); Merchants and Citizens Handicap (1918); National Handicap (1918); Washington Handicap (1918); Clark Handicap (1919); Independence Handicap (1919); Kentucky Handicap (1919); Louisville Cup Handicap (1919); Durham Cup Stakes (1920); New Year's Stakes (1920); Connaught Cup Stakes (1921); Windsor Hotel Cup Handicap (1921); Latonia Cup Handicap (1922); Cowdin Stakes (1923, 1928); Remsen Stakes (1923, 1925); Flash Stakes (1924); Hartsdale Stakes (1924); Hourless Handicap (1924); Pimlico Futurity (1924); Metropolitan Handicap (1924, 1928); Oceanus Handicap (1924); Saratoga Cup (1924); Manhattan Handicap (1925); Edgemere Handicap (1926); Alabama Stakes (1927); Coaching Club American Oaks (1927); Brooklyn Handicap (1927); Empire City Handicap (1927); Lawrence Realization Stakes (1927); Debutante Stakes (1928); Aqueduct Handicap (1928); Saranac Handicap (1928)

Significant horses
- Boniface, Chance Play, Ladkin, Nimba, Peanuts, Stimulus

Harold H. Thurber (November 23, 1892 - July 27, 1968) was an American jockey in Thoroughbred racing who was a subject in a Franklin Brooke Voss oil painting sitting aboard Nimba, a filly he guided to 1927 American Champion Three-Year-Old Filly honors for owner Marshall Field III.

== Background ==
A native of North Dakota, Harold Thurber rode primarily at racetracks on the East Coast of the United States and in Kentucky. In 1924 he rode under contract for Robert L. Gerry Sr. and Marshall Field III. In winning the 1926 Edgemere Handicap at Aqueduct Racetrack Harold Thurber rode Peanuts to a new world record time for a mile and one-eighth on dirt with a clocking of 1:48.60. In 1928 he was aboard Lawley for a sixth-place finish in the 1928 Kentucky Derby.
