= Challenge Me =

American-bred Thoroughbred racehorse

- Sire: Challenger II
- Grandsire: Swynford
- Dam: Cash Book
- Damsire: Bull Dog
- Sex: Stallion
- Foaled: 1941
- Country: United States
- Colour: Bay
- Breeder: Warner L. Jones, Jr.
- Owner: Brolite Farm
- Trainer: Dan Cataldo
- Record: 84: 13-11-10
- Earnings: US$126,392

Major wins
- Arkansas Derby (1944); Oaklawn Handicap (1944); Hollywood Gold Cup (1945)

Challenge Me (foaled 1941) was an American Thoroughbred racehorse who won top races in 1944 including the Oaklawn Handicap which he won by ten lengths while setting a new track record. He followed up with a win in the Arkansas Derby In 1945 he added to his win total with a victory in that fall's Hollywood Gold Cup.
