= Rowe Memorial Handicap =

- Class: Discontinued stakes race
- Location: Bowie Race Track, Bowie, Maryland, United States
- Inaugurated: 1930
- Race type: Thoroughbred - Flat racing

Race information
- Distance: 6 furlongs
- Surface: Dirt
- Track: left-handed
- Qualification: Three-year-olds & up
- Purse: $10,000

The Rowe Memorial Handicap was an American Thoroughbred horse race run between 1930 and 1954 at Bowie Race Track in Bowie, Maryland. A six furlong sprint run on dirt, the event was open to horses age three and older.

First run on April 5, 1930, the race was originally named to honor James Rowe, a widely respected trainer and future U.S. Racing Hall of Fame inductee who had died in 1929. However, his son James Jr., who had successfully followed in his father's footsteps, died from a heart attack in 1931 at age forty-two and the race name would be shortened to the "Rowe Memorial" to honor both men.

== Historical notes ==
The inaugural James Rowe Memorial Handicap was won by Battleship, a son of the legendary Man o' War. He was bred and raced on the flat by Walter Salmon but who would sell the horse to Marion duPont Scott at the end of 1931. She had Battleship trained for steeplechase racing and in 1934 he won the American Grand National, the most important steeplechase event in the United States. Sent to race in England, in 1938 Battleship became only the second American-bred horse to ever win the world's most prestigious steeplechase race, the Grand National. A 1969 U.S. Racing Hall of Fame inductee, through 2021 Battleship remains the only horse to have won both the American and English Grand Nationals.

Following the United States government's imposition of World War II rationing, the restrictions saw all four Maryland tracks having to run their 1944 spring meets at Baltimore's Pimlico Race Course. The April 12, 1944 Rowe Memorial, raced on a muddy track, was won by the increasingly powerful Calumet Farm stable with their colt Pensive who won by a head over runner-up Porter's Cap owned by Charles S. Howard of Seabiscuit fame. Pensive went on to win the May 6, 1944 Kentucky Derby and a week later, the May 13 Preakness Stakes.

The Rowe Memorial was run for the last time on April 17, 1954. For owner Constance Pistorio and her trainer J. Bowes Bond, it marked their third straight win of this event.

== Records ==
Speed record:

- 1:11.00 @ 6 furlongs: Tuscany (1952)

Most wins:

- 2 – Tuscany (1952, 1953)

Most wins by a jockey:

- 2 - Silvio Coucci (1934, 1935)
- 2 - Jack Westrope (1937, 1947)
- 2 - Nick Shuk (1953, 1954)

Most wins by a trainer:

- 3 - J. Bowes Bond (1952, 1953, 1954)

Most wins by an owner:

- 3 - Constance Pistorio (1952, 1953, 1954)

== Winners ==
Year	Winner	Age	Jockey	Trainer	Owner	Dist. (furlongs)	Time	Win $
1954	Brazen Brat	6	Nick Shuk	J. Bowes Bond	Constance Pistorio	6 f	1:11.40	$7,100
1953	Tuscany	5	Nick Shuk	J. Bowes Bond	Constance Pistorio	6 f	1:11.00	$7,700
1952	Tuscany	4	Sam Boulmetis	J. Bowes Bond	Constance Pistorio	6 f	1:11.60	$7,480
1951	Call Over	4	Robert J. Martin	Edward J. Yowell	Bedford Stable	6 f	1:12.00	$5,395
1950	The Pincher	4	Ronnie Nash	George Mohr	Henry H. Hecht	6 f	1:11.80	$6,275
1949	Nearway	4	Nunzio Pariso	Thomas H. Heard Jr.	Claude C. Tanner	6 f	1:11.60	$7,600
1948	Repand	4	Logan Batcheller	James J. Rowan	Sylvester W. Labrot Jr.	6 f	1:13.80	$8,175
1947	Scholarship	5	Jack Westrope	Kenneth L. W. Force Jr.	George G. Gilbert Jr.	6 f	1:13.40	$7,175
1946	Swiv	6	Arnold Kirkland	Leo G. O'Donnell	Harold C. Genter	6 f	1:12.00	$6,375
1945	Harford	5	Carson Kirk	Phillip Brady	Ruth McClanaghan	6 f	1:13.00	$3,200
1944	Pensive	3	Conn McCreary	Ben A. Jones	Calumet Farm	6 f	1:15.00	$6,375
1943	Race not held							
1942	Cape Cod	4	George Woolf	Raymond B. Archer	Grover C. Greer Jr.	6 f	1:12.60	$4,600
1941	Omission	3	Don Meade	J. P. "Sammy" Smith	Victor Emanuel	6 f	1:14.00	$4,225
1940	Honey Cloud	6	Danny Driscoll	Albert J. Abel	Dorothy Abel	6 f	1:11.80	$4,175
1939	Rough Time	5	Hilton Dabson	J. Yancey Christmas	J. Yancey Christmas	6 f	1:13.20	$4,575
1938	Sun Egret	3	Alfred Shelhamer	H. Guy Bedwell	A. C. Compton	6 f	1:13.80	$4,250
1937	Mucho Gusto	5	Jack Westrope	Robert F. Curran	Araho Stable (Mr. & Mrs. Walter O'Hara)	6 f	1:13.60	$4,125
1936	Bright Light	3	Harry Richards	John J. Greely Jr.	Shandon Farm Stables (Patrick A. & Richard J. Nash)	6 f	1:14.00	$2,770
1935	Good Harvest	3	Silvio Coucci	Hirsch Jacobs	B B Stable (Isidor Bieber)	6 f	1:13.80	$2,530
1934	Soon Over	3	Silvio Coucci	William Brennan	Greentree Stable	6 f	1:13.00	$2,900
1933	Race not held							
1932	Towee	3	John Bejshak	Joseph H. Stotler	Sagamore Farm Stable	6 f	1:13.00	$3,480
1931	Mynheer	3	Arthur Robertson	William E. Caskey Jr.	William E. Caskey Jr.	7 f	1:26.20	$3,390
1930	Battleship	3	Louis Schaefer	John R. "Jack" Pryce	Walter J. Salmon Sr.	7 f	1:27.00	$3,380
