= Stagehand (horse) =

American Thoroughbred racehorse

- Sire: Sickle
- Grandsire: Phalaris
- Dam: Stagecraft
- Damsire: Fair Play
- Sex: Stallion
- Foaled: 1935
- Country: United States
- Colour: Bay
- Breeder: Joseph E. Widener
- Owner: Col. Maxwell Howard
- Trainer: Earl Sande
- Record: 25: 9-3-6
- Earnings: $200,110

Major wins
- Derby Trial Graded Handicap (1938); Santa Anita Derby (1938); Santa Anita Handicap (1938); Empire City Handicap (1938); Rhode Island Governor's Handicap (1938); Narragansett Special (1938); McLennan Memorial Handicap (1939)

Awards
- American Champion Three-Year-Old Male Horse (1938)

Stagehand (foaled 1935 in Kentucky) was an American Thoroughbred racehorse who is the only horse to ever win the Santa Anita Handicap as a three-year-old.

== Background ==
Bred by the prominent horseman Joseph E. Widener, Stagehand was sired by Sickle, who was a son of the influential English sire Phalaris. His dam was Stagecraft, a daughter of U.S. Racing Hall of Fame inductee and Leading broodmare sire in North America, Fair Play.

Maxwell Howard of Ohio, purchased Sceneshifter, Stagehand's full older brother. Impressed by Sceneshifter, Howard took advantage of Widener weeding out his stable. He purchased Stagehand for $8000 at the recommendation of Earl Sande, his trainer. Entered in a Maiden Special Weight at Aqueduct, Stagehand was scratched for unknown reasons and instead shipped up to Empire City Racetrack with the rest of Howard's small stable which included Brooklyn Handicap winner The Chief.

== 1937: two-year-old season ==
On July 6, 1937, Stagehand was entered in a 5-furlong event for maidens. He broke last and never made up any ground, as victor Flying Ariel beat him handily. Shipped to Saratoga, Stagehand ran on July 28 in a 5 1/2-furlong allowance. Third this time, Stagehand produced a closing run to nab third while Chaps and Jack be Noble ran first and second. Apparently the effort impressed Sande and Howard, for Stagehand's next start was the United States Hotel Stakes. Chaps had once before and had no trouble doing it again, while Stagehand ran fifth under jockey Jack Westrope. Dropped down in class in an effort to get a win after running just five days earlier, Stagehand finished a troubled fifth again. Sande took Westrope off the horse and gave Balaski a try. Stagehand ran fourth.

Running at the Spa wasn't working, so with Balaski back up, Stagehand was entered in another maiden at Belmont Park. The change of tracks did little to help as he finished second to last, 17th in a field of 18. Howard entered the horse in an allowance 8 days later, and Stagehand finished fifth. Howard then entered him in a 7-furlong maiden race. Stagehand finished third by a nose to Alps. Bonnie Sea, who finished second, was taken down due to her severe bumping as Stagehand came up the inside. Shipped to Santa Anita for the winter meet, after two months off Stagehand was entered in a mile event for maidens on New Year's Day, going 7 furlongs. Gipsy Minstrel won handily, and Stagehand finished a closing second.

== 1938: three-year-old season ==
As a three-year-old Stagehand won the Santa Anita Derby, Santa Anita Handicap, Empire City Handicap, Narragansett Special and the Rhode Island Governor's Handicap by six lengths while setting a new track record.

== Stud record ==
Retired to stud duty, he had modest success as the sire of several stakes race winners. His last foal was born in 1953.
