= Edgemere Handicap =

- Class: Discontinued stakes
- Location: Aqueduct Racetrack; Queens, New York City, United States
- Inaugurated: 1901 - 1957
- Race type: Thoroughbred - Flat racing

Race information
- Distance: 1 1/8 miles (9 furlongs)
- Surface: Dirt
- Track: left-handed
- Qualification: All ages

The Edgemere Handicap was an American Thoroughbred horse race. Inaugurated in 1901 at the old Aqueduct Racetrack, it was open to horses of all ages and contested on dirt at a distance of one mile and seventy yards. The following year the distance was changed to one mile and one furlong.

In 1902 and again in 1908, the race was won by a two-year-old. Allan, a colt owned and trained by Frank M. Kelly was the first then Fashion Plate won in 1908.

On June 11, 1908, the Republican controlled New York Legislature under Governor Charles Evans Hughes passed the Hart-Agnew anti-betting legislation. The owners of Aqueduct Racetrack, and other racing facilities in New York State, struggled to stay in business without income from betting. The Edgemere Handicap was a victim of necessary cost-cutting measures and as a result here was no race between 1909 and 1916. A February 21, 1913 ruling by the New York Supreme Court, Appellate Division saw horse racing return in 1913. However, the Edgemere was not revived until 1917 and to fit horsemen's needs, the race conditions were modified to make it a contest for horses age three and older.

The Edgemere Handicap remained at Aqueduct Racetrack until 1956 when it was hosted by the Jamaica Racetrack at a mile and a sixteenth. The final edition was run on June 20, 1957 at Belmont Park.

A new Edgemere Handicap was established at Aqueduct Racetrack in 1960 which in 1981 was renamed the Red Smith Handicap.

== Records ==
Speed record:

- 1:48.40 @ 1-1/8 miles: Hash (1939)

Most wins:

- 2 – Peanuts (1925, 1926)
- 2 - Hash (1939, 1940)

Most wins by a jockey:

- 4 - Eddie Arcaro (1939, 1940, 1942, 1949)

Most wins by a trainer:

- 4 - James E. Fitzsimmons (1921, 1929, 1932, 1943)
- 4 - John M. Gaver Sr. (1939, 1940, 1942, 1951)

Most wins by an owner:

- 4 - Greentree Stable (1939, 1940, 1942, 1949)

== Winners ==
Year	Winner	Age	Jockey	Trainer	Owner	Dist. (Miles)	Time	Win$
1957	Admiral Vee	5	Willie Lester	H. Allen Jerkens	Edward Seinfeld	1-1/8 m	1:49.60	$19,300
1956	Artismo	5	Hedley Woodhouse	Robert L. Dotter	James Cox Brady	1-1/16 m	1:43.60	$19,800
1955	Paper Tiger	4	Conn McCreary	Hirsch Jacobs	Ethel D. Jacobs	1-1/8 m	1:50.40	$19,250
1954	Invigorator	4	Eric Guerin	Edward A. Neloy	Saxon Stable (Riley Allison & Max Prestridge)	1-1/8 m	1:52.00	$19,950
1953	Level Lea	3	Bobby Green	Max Hirsch	John S. Phipps	1-1/8 m	1:52.40	$20,000
1952	Out Point	4	Nick Wall	Oleg T. Dubassoff	Lazy F Ranch	1-1/8 m	1:50.20	$9,150
1951	One Hitter	5	Ted Atkinson	John M. Gaver Sr.	Greentree Stable	1-1/4 m	2:03.20	$18,900
1950	Three Rings	5	Hedley Woodhouse	William J. Knapp	Evelyn L. Hopkins	1-1/8 m	1:49.40	$16,125
1949	My Request	4	Eddie Arcaro	James P. Conway	Ben F. Whitaker	1-1/8 m	1:50.80	$15,675
1948	Loyal Legion	4	Ted Atkinson	Oscar White	Walter M. Jeffords	1-1/8 m	1:52.40	$19,050
1947	Elpis	5	Ovie Scurlock	William M. Booth	William G. Helis Sr.	1-1/8 m	1:52.40	$18,500
1946	Stymie	5	Basil James	Hirsch Jacobs	Ethel D. Jacobs	1-1/8 m	1:50.40	$19,750
1945	Olympic Zenith	4	Wayne Wright	William M. Booth	William G. Helis Sr.	1-1/8 m	1:51.20	$12,050
1944	Strategic	4	Francis Thacker	Sol Rutchick	Havaholme Stable (Frank & Joseph Rabinovich)	1-1/8 m	1:52.00	$11,000
1943	Apache	4	James Stout	James E. Fitzsimmons	Belair Stud	1-1/8 m	1:49.40	$11,950
1942	The Rhymer	4	Eddie Arcaro	John M. Gaver Sr.	Greentree Stable	1-1/8 m	1:49.60	$7,875
1941	Market Wise	3	Wendell Eads	George W. Carroll	Louis Tufano	1-1/8 m	1:50.00	$7,975
1940	Hash	4	Eddie Arcaro	John M. Gaver Sr.	Greentree Stable	1-1/8 m	1:50.40	$8,175
1939	Hash	3	Eddie Arcaro	John M. Gaver Sr.	Greentree Stable	1-1/8 m	1:48.40	$7,450
1938	Idle Miss	4	Alfred Robertson	B. Frank Christmas	B. Frank Christmas	1-1/8 m	1:49.20	$6,200
1937	Strabo	3	Lester Balaski	Roy Waldron	Hope Goddard Iselin	1-1/8 m	1:50.00	$6,700
1936	Action	7	John Gilbert	Hirsch Jacobs	Ethel D. Jacobs	1-1/8 m	1:49.80	$5,030
1933	1935	Race not held						
1932	Blenhein III	4	Tommy Malley	James E. Fitzsimmons	Wheatley Stable	1-1/8 m	1:50.80	$1,700
1931	Curate	5	Mack Garner	Henry McDaniel	Joseph E. Widener	1-1/8 m	1:50.80	$3,080
1930	Live Oak	4	Sidney P. Hebert	Walter A. Carter	Rosedale Stable (George Clarke)	1-1/8 m	1:51.00	$6,250
1929	Distraction	4	Danny McAuliffe	James E. Fitzsimmons	Wheatley Stable	1-1/8 m	1:51.00	$5,850
1928	Ironsides	3	Linus McAtee	George P. Odom	Robert L. Gerry	1-1/8 m	1:52.20	$6,300
1927	Black Maria	4	Frank Coltiletti	William H. Karrick	William R. Coe	1-1/8 m	1:50.20	$5,500
1926	Peanuts	4	Harold Thurber	George P. Odom	Aknusti Stable	1-1/8 m	1:48.60	$6,050
1925	Peanuts	3	Harry Richards	George P. Odom	Aknusti Stable	1-1/8 m	1:51.60	$5,650
1924	Ladkin	3	Clarence Kummer	Louis Feustel	August Belmont Jr.	1-1/8 m	1:49.60	$7,200
1923	Little Chief	4	Earl Sande	Sam Hildreth	Rancocas Stable	1-1/8 m	1:52.60	$5,450
1922	Lucky Hour	3	Andy Schuttinger	Roy Waldron	Lexington Stable (Edward F. Simms & Henry W. Oliver)	1-1/8 m	1:50.00	$7.600
1921	Captain Alcock	4	Linus McAtee	James E. Fitzsimmons	Quincy Stable (James Francis Johnson)	1-1/8 m	1:50.60	$5,150
1920	John P. Grier	3	Eddie Ambrose	James G. Rowe Sr.	Harry Payne Whitey	1-1/8 m	1:51.40	$3,150
1919	Lucullite	4	Laverne Fator	Sam Hildreth	Sam Hildreth	1-1/8 m	1:50.00	$2,725
1918	George Smith	5	Lawrence Lyke	Hollie Hughes	John Sanford	1-1/8 m	1:50.80	$2,700
1917	Chiclet	5	Frank Keogh	J. Howard Lewis	Joseph E. Widener	1-1/16 m	1:47.20	$1,645
1909	1916	Race not held						
1908	Fashion Plate	2	Jack Upton	William H. Karrick	Oneck Stable	1-1/8 m	1:53.40	$650
1907	Ballot	3	Joe Notter	James G. Rowe Sr.	James R. Keene	1-1/8 m	1:53.00	$1,800
1906	Running Water	3	Walter Miller	Thomas Welsh	Newcastle Stable	1-1/8 m	1:52.00	$1,950
1905	Bedouin	3	Willie Shaw	John Huggins	Edward W. Jewett	1-1/8 m	1:53.00	$1,880
1904	Dolly Spanker	3	Herman H. Phillips	T. J. Healey	Richard T. Wilson Jr.	1-1/8 m	1:57.60	$1,410
1903	Hermis	4	Arthur Redfern	William Shields	Edward R. Thomas	1-1/8 m	1:53.00	$1,370
1902	Allan	2	Arthur Redfern	Frank M. Kelly	Frank M. Kelly	1-1/8 m	1:56.00	$920
1901	Ethics	3	Harry Cochran	Richard O. Miller	Charles F. Dwyer	1 m,70 yd.	1:46.60	$620
