= Brookdale Handicap =

Former American Thoroughbred horse race

- Class: Discontinued stakes
- Location: Gravesend Race Track, Brooklyn, New York (1887–1910); Aqueduct Racetrack, Queens, New York (1914–1933)
- Inaugurated: 1887
- Race type: Thoroughbred – Flat racing

Race information
- Distance: 1 1/8 miles, (9 furlongs)furlong
- Surface: Dirt
- Track: left-handed
- Qualification: Three-years-old & up
- Weight: Assigned

The Brookdale Handicap was an American Thoroughbred horse race run annually in midsummer from 1887 through 1910 at Gravesend Race Track in Brooklyn, New York and from 1914 through 1933 at Aqueduct Racetrack in Queens. Open to horses aged three and older, it was contested on dirt over a distance of one mile, one furlong.

Gravesend Race Track opened on August 26, 1886, and the first Brookdale Handicap would be run during the following Spring/Summer racing season. On May 26, 1887, the inaugural running of the Brookdale Handicap was won by future Hall of Fame inductee, Hanover, ridden by Jim McLaughlin and trained by Frank McCabe both of whom would also be inducted in racing's Hall of Fame.

There was no race held for the three years between 1911 and 1913 as a result of the passage by the New York Legislature of the Republican Party's Hart–Agnew Law. Following a Court ruling, racing resumed in New York State but by then the financial problems arising from the law's effects resulted in the Gravsend track having gone out of business. The Brookdale Handicap was revived in 1914 by the Queens County Jockey Club at its Aqueduct Racetrack.

In 1933, the race was run at one mile. This was the last of the races ran for this course.

== Records ==
Speed record:

- 1:48.80 – Peanuts (1927)

Most wins:

- 2 – Go Between (1905, 1906)

== Winners of the Brookdale Handicap ==
- 1933 – Flagstone
- 1932 – Blenheim III
- 1931 – Sidney Grant
- 1930 – Jack High
- 1929 – Diavolo
- 1928 – Victorian
- 1927 – Peanuts
- 1926 – Macaw
- 1925 – Whetstone
- 1924 – Mad Play
- 1923 – Flagstaff
- 1922 – Captain Alcock
- 1921 – Yellow Hand
- 1920 – Exterminator
- 1919 – Trompe La Mort
- 1918 – Hand Grenade
- 1917 – Boots
- 1916 – Short Grass
- 1915 – Roamer
- 1914 – Flying Fairy
- 1913 – no race
- 1912 – no race
- 1911 – no race
- 1910 – Fashion Plate
- 1909 – Joe Madden
- 1908 – Gretna Green
- 1907 – Zambesi
- 1906 – Go Between
- 1905 – Go Between
- 1904 – Hermis
- 1903 – Hunter Raine
- 1902 – Morningside
- 1901 – Carbuncle
- 1900 – Jean Bereaud
- 1899 – Don De Oro
- 1898 – Royal Stag
- 1897 – Lehman
- 1896 – St. Maxim
- 1895 – Stephen J
- 1894 – Don Alonzo
- 1893 – Charade
- 1892 – Major Domo
- 1891 – Eon
- 1890 – Grey Dawn
- 1889 – Inspector B
- 1888 – Richmond
- 1887 – Hanover
