= Joseph McLennan =

American racing secretary

Joseph McLennan (died December 21, 1933) was an American racing secretary. He was born in Scotland and came to the U.S. when he was eight years old. He worked at many different racing tracks, including Arlington Park in Chicago, Bowie and Havre de Grace in Maryland, Hialeah Park, and Aqueduct and Jamaica in New York. He died of influenza on December 21, 1933, in Miami. After he died, the Joseph McLennan Memorial Handicap race was named for him; it was first run on March 11, 1934.
