= Narragansett Special =

- Class: Discontinued stakes
- Location: Narragansett Park; Pawtucket, Rhode Island, United States
- Inaugurated: 1934 - Winner: Time Supply
- Race type: Thoroughbred - Flat racing

Race information
- Distance: 1 3/16 miles (9.5 furlongs)
- Surface: Dirt
- Track: left-handed
- Qualification: Three-years-old & up
- Weight: Handicap
- Purse: $25,000

The Narragansett Special was an American Thoroughbred horse race run annually at Narragansett Park in Pawtucket, Rhode Island. At the time of its inaugural running in 1934, the Narragansett Special offered a purse of $32,500 added money making it the biggest race run at the track. Only Suffolk Downs' Massachusetts Handicap, which ran the next summer, had a bigger purse in New England. Both rich contests drew the best talent that the nation had to offer.

Open to horses age three and older, the race was run over a distance of 1 3/16 miles (9.5 furlongs). The Special started at the top of the Narragansett stretch with a run of 3/16ths to the wire and then one full lap around the one mile dirt oval.

== Historical notes ==
Across its history, the "Special" was run in late summer and fall, over fast and sloppy tracks, and even in the snow one year (Wise Margin – 1955).

Time Supply, under jockey Tommy Luther, won the very first Special. A. A. Baroni's Top Row and Rosemont, for William duPont, won the next two editions.

An instant success, the race continued to attract the top horses from across the United States. 1937 had Mrs. Ella K. Bryson's gelding Calumet Dick, with Hilton Dabson riding, captured the event. A former Calumet Farm runner that loved the mud, Calumet Dick upset Wheatley Stable's Snark and national superstar Seabiscuit. The 'Biscuit was made the betting favorite by his fans, but proved his dislike for "off" going and saw a seven race winning streak snapped when he finished third on the sloppy track under high-weight of 132 lbs.

Over the years, the race was won by racing stars such as future U. S. Racing Hall of Fame inductees Challedon (won:1939 / inducted:1977) and Whirlaway (won:1942, inducted:1959).

In 1941, Glen Riddle Farm's War Relic upset that year's Triple Crown winner, Whirlaway.

Top jockeys Eddie Arcaro, Ted Atkinson, Johnny Longden, George Woolf, and Jack Westrope are among the riding stars that won the "Special". Lucky Draw equaled the World Record for the distance, while carving his name in the Track Records Narragansett Park, when he defeated Pavot and Armed in 1946. Many considered this to be the race of the year.

The event was not run in 1947 due to an outbreak of Swamp Fever. The outbreak of the disease, with an official title of Equine Infectious Anemia (EIA), had caused the death of 77 horses at Rockingham Park that summer. The inter-state shipping of horses that Fall was greatly restricted.

The 1948 edition had Rhode Island in the middle of a record late August "heat wave" with temperatures of over 100 degrees Fahrenheit. When added with the cancellation of the previous year, the race drew its smallest attendance figure of only 12,612 people. Donor, under jockey Arnold Kirkland, won the race for owner W. Deering Howe.

In 1949, Donor, a son of Challedon, became the only two-time winner of the race by defeating the Santa Anita Handicap winner of 1949, Vulcan's Forge; and Calumet Farm's 1949 Kentucky Derby winner, Ponder. In a three-horse photo finish, Warren Mehrtens had his mount's head in front at the wire. More than 30,000 were in attendance at this race.

1949 Advertisement

On September 19, 1953, Sailed Away, with New England riding legend Anthony DeSpirito "up" for trainer R. E. Harper and Rhode Island–based Vigilant Stable, became the only local outfit to win the Special.

1954 revealed Alfred G. Vanderbilt II in the paddock as his Social Outcast was saddled for a popular 3-length victory. The purse swelled to $42,450, making it the richest running. It also had the largest field as 18 horses made the post. Social Outcast broke from the 15 hole and as jockey Eric Guerin made the lead he lost his right stirrup in deep stretch. Guerin did well to remain on the horse as "Old Sosh" bolted towards the outside rail.

Vanderbilt, after reducing the size of his racing stable through a dispersal sale, brought another star from his class of 1950 to Gansett. The six year old Find capped his 1956 season with an easy three length victory in the Special.

By the late 1950s, attendance and betting handle were down at the track. It was harder to attract the best horses to the region and Narragansett Park and the Special declined in prestige. Without a breeding industry in New England, the quality of horse racing throughout the area went into a steep decline. There were also betting scandals. The purse was lowered to $25,000 added in 1955 and did not keep pace with other top races. That year did have Jim Conzelman coach of the NFL world champion Providence Steam Rollers of 1928 present the winning trophy to owner Sam Tufano after Wise Margin's impressive score.

Finally, in 1963, one last future Hall of Fame horse, Gun Bow (inducted HoF:1999), won his first stakes race in the Narragansett Special. He drew off by 13 lengths with jockey Steve Brooks aboard. Gun Bow would gain fame by having stirring duels with Kelso, the unofficial "horse of the 1960s". In true 'Gansett fashion, the race was run on a Friday and drew a paid attendance of 6,877.

The 1963 running was the 29th, and final, edition of this once special race.

== Records ==
Speed record:

- 1:54 3/5 – Lucky Draw (1946) (equaled World record for dirt)

Most wins:

- 2 – Donor (1948, 1949)

Most wins by a jockey:

- 3 – Ted Atkinson (1941, 1951, 1956)

Most wins by an owner:

- 2 – Greentree Stable (1940, 1951)
- 2 – W. Deering Howe (1948, 1949)
- 2 – Alfred G. Vanderbilt II (1954, 1956)

== Winners ==
Year	Winner	Age	Jockey	Trainer	Owner	Dist. (Miles)	Time
1963	Gun Bow	3	Steve Brooks	Edward A. Neloy	Gedney Farm	13/16 M	1:58.80
1962	Wise Flushing	4	Manuel Ycaza	Kay Erik Jensen	Gustave A. Smith	13/16 M	1:58.80
1961	Count Amber	4	James W. Davern Jr.	Lucien Laurin	Reginald N. Webster	13/16 M	1:58.40
1960	Reinzi	5	Jimmy Combest	E. Barry Ryan	J. Frederic Gagel	13/16 M	1:57.40
1959	Net Ball	4	Bill Skuse	Willard C. Freeman	Warner G. Morton	13/16 M	1:57.00
1958	Sharpsburg	5	Howard Grant	Warren A. Croll Jr.	Roy E. Faircloth	13/16 M	1:57.00
1957	Oh Johnny	4	William Boland	Norman R. McLeod	Mrs. Wallace Gilroy	13/16 M	1:57.60
1956	Find	6	Ted Atkinson	William C. Winfrey	Alfred G. Vanderbilt II	13/16 M	1:57.00
1955	Wise Margin	5	Bobby Ussery	Sam N. Edmundson	Samuel Tufano	13/16 M	1:58.40
1954	Social Outcast	4	Eric Guerin	William C. Winfrey	Alfred G. Vanderbilt II	13/16 M	1:58.00
1953	Sailed Away	4	Anthony DeSpirito	R. E. Harper	Vigilant Stable	13/16 M	1:56.60
1952	General Staff	4	James Stout	James McGee	Larry MacPhail	13/16 M	1:56.40
1951	Hall of Fame	3	Ted Atkinson	John M. Gaver Sr.	Greentree Stable	13/16 M	1:56.80
1950	De Luxe	4	Eugene Rodriguez	Frank Gilpin	True Davis Jr.	13/16 M	1:57.60
1949	Donor	5	Warren Mehrtens	George P. Odom	Mrs. W. Deering Howe	13/16 M	1:56.40
1948	Donor	4	Arnold Kirkland	George P. Odom	W. Deering Howe	13/16 M	1:57.40
1947	Race not held						
1946	Lucky Draw	5	Conn McCreary	Bert Mulholland	George D. Widener Jr.	13/16 M	1:54.60
1945	Westminster	4	Willie Garner	James McGee	Morris Wexler	13/16 M	1:58.00
1944	Paperboy	6	Warren Mehrtens	Jimmy Coleman	W-L Ranch Co.	13/16 M	1:56.00
1943	Market Wise	5	Johnny Longden	George W. Carroll	Louis Tufano	13/16 M	1:55.40
1942	Whirlaway	4	George Woolf	Ben A. Jones	Calumet Farm	13/16 M	1:56.40
1941	War Relic	3	Ted Atkinson	Walter A. Carter	Glen Riddle Farm	13/16 M	1:57.20
1940	Hash	4	Eddie Arcaro	John M. Gaver Sr.	Greentree Stable	13/16 M	1:57.00
1939	Challedon	3	Harry Richards	Louis Schaefer	William L. Brann	13/16 M	1:56.60
1938	Stagehand	3	Jack Westrope	Earl Sande	Col. Maxwell Howard	13/16 M	1:56.20
1937	Calumet Dick	5	Hilton Dabson	Harry Baker	Ella K. Bryson	13/16 M	1:57.00
1936	Rosemont	4	Harry Richards	Richard E. Handlen	Foxcatcher Farms	13/16 M	1:56.40
1935	Top Row	4	Wayne Wright	Albert A. Baroni	Albert A. Baroni	13/16 M	1:55.80
1934	Time Supply	3	Tommy Luther	Frank C. Travis	Mrs. Frank A. Carreaud	13/16 M	1:57.00
