= David J. Schneider =

American psychologist

David J. Schneider is an American psychologist. He is a professor of psychology and the director of the cognitive sciences program at Rice University.

== Career and work ==
Schneider's most important published work deals chiefly with cognitive psychology and organizational psychology, especially bias, prejudice, and discrimination.

Schneider received his Bachelor of Arts degree in philosophy and psychology cum laude from Wabash College in 1962, and his Ph.D. in social psychology in 1966 from Stanford University. Positions held include:

- Assistant Professor, Amherst College, 1966–1971
- Visiting assistant professor, Stanford University, 1970–71
- Associate Professor, Brandeis University, 1971–1975
- Associate Professor, University of Texas at San Antonio, 1975–1978
- Professor, University of Texas at San Antonio, 1978–1988
- Visiting associate professor, Stanford University, 1978
- Visiting professor, Indiana University, 1987–1988
- Professor, Rice University, 1989–present, chair, Psychology Department 1990-1996
