= Jack Westrope =

American jockey

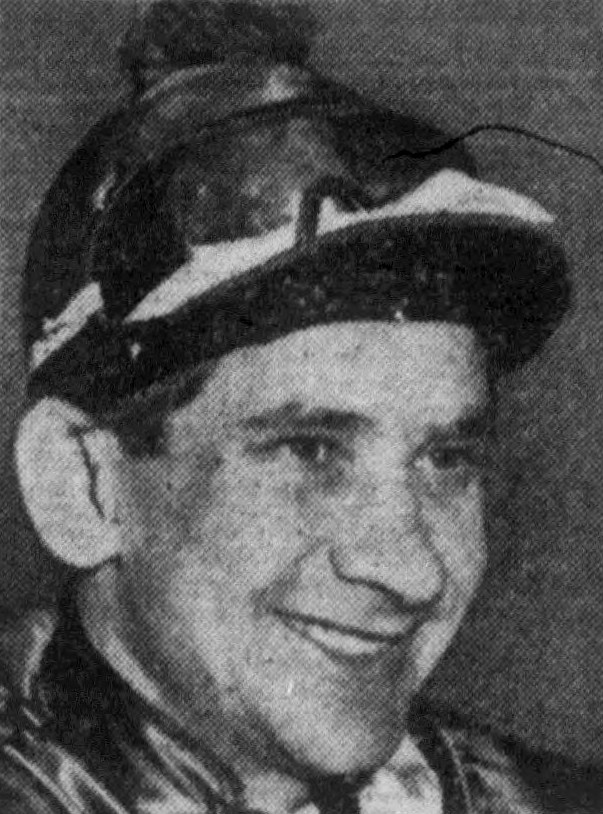
- Westrope, circa 1954

Personal information
- Born: January 18, 1918 Baker, Montana, U.S.
- Died: June 19, 1958 (aged 40) Inglewood, California, U.S.
- Occupation: Jockey

Horse racing career
- Sport: Horse racing
- Career wins: 2,467

Major racing wins
- Champlain Handicap (1935); Potomac Handicap (1936); Bahamas Stakes (1937); Blue Grass Stakes (1937); Rowe Memorial Handicap (1937, 1947); Stars and Stripes Handicap (1937); Santa Anita Derby (1938); Empire City Handicap (1938); Tremont Stakes (1938); Narragansett Special (1938); Matron Stakes (1939); San Juan Capistrano Handicap(1939); Suburban Handicap (1939); Westerner Stakes (1939, 1946, 1950); Cowdin Stakes (1941); Hollywood Gold Cup (1941); Jerome Handicap (1943); Hollywood Derby (1946, 1950); Fashion Stakes (1947); Vosburgh Stakes (1947); Frizette Stakes (1947); Del Mar Derby (1949); Hollywood Lassie Stakes (1949); San Antonio Handicap (1949); Massachusetts Handicap (1953); San Luis Obispo Handicap (1953); Delaware Oaks (1954); San Fernando Stakes (1954, 1956); National Stallion Stakes (filly division) (1955); Laurel Turf Cup Handicap (1956)

Racing awards
- United States Champion Jockey by wins (1933)

Honours
- National Museum of Racing and Hall of Fame (2002)

Significant horses
- Big Pebble, Cravat, Parlo, Stagehand
- Updated on May 14, 2010

Jack Gordon Westrope (January 18, 1918 – June 19, 1958) was an American Hall of Fame jockey in Thoroughbred horse racing.

Born in Baker, Montana, Westrope was the son of racehorse owner/trainer W. T. Westrope. Jack was only 12 years old when he rode his first winner, on a small track in Lemmon, South Dakota. By age 15, while still officially an apprentice jockey, he was the leading rider in the U.S. for 1933. Westrope scored 301 victories from the 1,224 races he competed in that year, giving him a 25% win rate, the highest for any national title holder during the past twenty-four years.

Although based on the West Coast of the United States, Jack Westrope won races across the United States and in Cuba. During his career, he rode 2,467 winners including in numerous important graded stakes races such as the Santa Anita Derby, Blue Grass Stakes, and the Hollywood Gold Cup.

During the running of the 1958 Hollywood Oaks at Hollywood Park Racetrack in Inglewood, California, Westrope was severely injured when he was thrown from his horse, Well Away, and died in hospital a few hours later.
