= George Seabo =

American jockey and trainer

Personal information
- Born: July 2, 1911 Croton-on-Hudson, New York, United States
- Died: February 26, 1991 (aged 79) Hollywood, Florida, United States
- Occupations: Jockey, Trainer

Horse racing career
- Sport: Horse racing

Major racing wins
- As a jockey: Dorval Juvenile Stakes (1931); Tropical Park Christmas Handicap (1936); Maryland Futurity (1938); New England Futurity (1938); Pimlico Futurity (1938); American Legion Handicap (1939); McLennan Handicap (1941); Widener Challenge Cup (1941); Lafayette Stakes (1944) As a trainer: Florida Breeders' Stakes (1959) U.S. Triple Crown wins: Preakness Stakes (1939)

George Seabo (July 2, 1911 - February 26, 1991) was an American jockey and trainer of Thoroughbred racehorses best known as a founding member of the Jockeys' Guild who rode future U.S. Racing Hall of Fame inductee Challedon to victory in the 1939 Preakness Stakes, the second leg of the U.S. Triple Crown series.

== Background ==
Born in Croton-on-Hudson, New York, George Seabo grew up in Hastings-on-Hudson, New York. He married Mildred Ryan of Roxbury, New York who gave up her job as Branch Manager of a cooperative bank to be a housewife. In a May 28, 1942 interview with The Hastings News she recounted how her husband could ride at 105 pounds and was a rarity among jockeys in that he never had to diet.

== Training career ==
The 1959 American Champion Two-Year-Old Filly My Dear Girl was initially trained by Melvin Calvert's assistant George Seabo but after the filly won the 1959 Florida Breeders' Stakes, Calvert took charge.
