= Edward A. Christmas =

American horse trainer (1903–1969)

Edward Christmas
Personal information
- Born: October 10, 1903 Upper Marlboro, Maryland, United States
- Died: October 17, 1969 (aged 66)
- Resting place: Saint Thomas Episcopal Church Cemetery, Croom, Maryland
- Occupation: Trainer

Horse racing career
- Sport: Horse racing

Major racing wins
- Philadelphia Handicap (1942); Dwyer Stakes (1943); Acorn Stakes (1945); Black-Eyed Susan Stakes (1945); Delaware Oaks (1945); Empire City Handicap (1945); Marguerite Stakes (1945); Bay Shore Handicap (1946); Brooklyn Handicap (1946); Beldame Stakes (1946); Metropolitan Handicap (1946); Ardsley Handicap (1947); Queens County Handicap (1947); Wilson Stakes (1947, 1948); Carter Handicap (1948); Peter Pan Stakes (1948); Whitney Handicap (1948); Gardenia Stakes (1955); Sysonby Handicap (1957); Merchants and Citizens Handicap (1959); Toboggan Handicap (1959); Lexington Handicap (1964); Mother Goose Stakes (1965)

Significant horses
- Challedon, Escadru, Gallorette, Nasrina, Vincentive

Edward Addicks Christmas (October 10, 1903 - October 17, 1969) was an American Thoroughbred horse racing trainer. Born in Upper Marlboro, Maryland, he is best known for training U. S. Racing Hall of Fame inductee Challedon in 1942, and Gallorette, the 1946 American Champion Older Female Horse and U. S. Racing Hall of Fame inductee.

Edward Christmas studied at the University of Maryland then attended its University of Maryland School of Law. He graduated in 1929 and for the next seven years worked for the law department at the university.

In the U.S. Triple Crown series, Edward Christmas earned a third-place finish in the 1943 Preakness Stakes. In 1948 he finished sixth with Escadru in the Kentucky Derby, then after skipping the Preakness, ran third in the Belmont Stakes. Escadru, who had won the 1947 Ardsley Handicap, went on to win the 1948 Peter Pan Stakes.

During his career, he trained for prominent owners such as William L. Brann and Howell E. Jackson III.
