= Louis Schaefer =

American jockey and horse trainer (1907–1988)

Louis J. Schaefer
Personal information
- Born: December 27, 1907
- Died: August 8, 1988 (aged 80) Hempstead, New York
- Occupation: Trainer

Horse racing career
- Sport: Horse racing

Major racing wins
- As a jockey: King Edward Stakes (1925); Pimlico Spring Handicap (1925); Canadian Derby (1926); Chesapeake Stakes (1927); Jennings Handicap (1927, 1931); Toronto Cup Stakes (1927); Spring Juvenile Stakes (1928); Windsor Hotel Cup Handicap (1928); Victoria Stakes (1929); Coaching Club American Oaks (1930); Ladies Handicap (1930); Rowe Memorial Handicap (1930); Ballot Handicap (1931); White Mountain Handicap (1934); Aberdeen Stakes (1935) U.S. Triple Crown series: Preakness Stakes (1929); As a trainer: Maryland Futurity (1938); New England Futurity (1938); Pimlico Futurity (1938); Arlington Classic (1939); Hawthorne Gold Cup Handicap (1939); Havre de Grace Handicap (1939, 1941); Narragansett Special (1939); Pimlico Special (1939); Yankee Handicap (1939); Chesapeake Stakes (1940); Hollywood Gold Cup (1940); Whitney Handicap (1940) U.S. Triple Crown series: Preakness Stakes (1936)

Significant horses
- Challedon, Display, Dr. Freeland, Sunfire, Whiskery

Louis J. Schaefer (December 27, 1907 – August 8, 1988) was an American jockey and trainer in Thoroughbred horse racing best known for winning the Preakness Stakes, second leg of the U.S. Triple Crown series, both as a jockey and as a trainer.

Schaefer rode Dr. Freeland to victory in the 1929 Preakness Stakes. He continued to ride into 1936 when he was hired by William L. Brann to take over as train for his racing stable in 1937. Louis Schaefer trained Challedon to win the 1939 Preakness and went on to earn American Horse of the Year honors for that year.

A resident of Uniondale, New York, in his latter years Louis Schaefer owned a bar and grill across the street from the old Jamaica Race Course. On August 8, 1988, he died of a heart attack at age 80 in a Hempstead, New York hospital.
