= Gallorette =

American-bred Thoroughbred racehorse

- Sire: Challenger II
- Grandsire: Swynford
- Dam: Gallette
- Damsire: Sir Gallahad III
- Sex: Mare
- Foaled: 1942
- Country: United States
- Color: Chestnut
- Breeder: Preston M. Burch
- Owner: William L. Brann
- Trainer: Edward A. Christmas
- Record: 72: 21-20-13
- Earnings: $445,535

Major wins
- Acorn Stakes (1945); Black-Eyed Susan Stakes (1945); Delaware Oaks (1945); Empire City Handicap (1945); Metropolitan Handicap (1946); Brooklyn Handicap (1946); Beldame Stakes (1946); Queens County Handicap (1947); Wilson Stakes (1947, 1948); Carter Handicap (1948); Whitney Handicap (1948)

Awards
- American Champion Older Female Horse (1946)

Honors
- United States Racing Hall of Fame (1962); Aiken Thoroughbred Racing Hall of Fame (1977); Maryland Thoroughbred Hall of Fame (2013) #45 - Top 100 U.S. Racehorses of 20th Century #3 Female - Top 100 U.S. Racehorses of 20th Century; Gallorette Handicap at Pimlico Race Course
- Last updated on August 20, 2020

Gallorette (1942–1959) was a Maryland-bred chestnut thoroughbred filly who became a Hall of Fame race horse. Sired by Challenger II, out of Gallette, Gallorette's damsire was Sir Gallahad III.

== Breeding ==
Trainer Preston M. Burch bought Gallette because of her highly successful sire, Sir Gallahad III. Because of her sire, the advertising executive William L. Brann, who co-owned a stallion called Challenger II, entered into an agreement with Burch that they would send Gallette to his stallion (who had sired Preakness winner Challedon) and then each would own her foals, first one for Brann and then one for Burch and so on. Gallette's first foal, Gallorette, went to Brann.

== Two-year-old season ==
Brann sent the young horse to the trainer Edward A. Christmas, a member of a noted family of Maryland horsemen. Gallorette grew into a big, rangy filly. Too gawky to start too young, she didn't make her first start until late in her second year. For her two-year-old season, beginning in September, she started in 8 races and won three. She was never out of the money.

== Three-year-old season ==
As a three-year-old in 1945, she stood 16 hands 1 inch. Her first race was a victory over Hoop Jr., the colt that went on to win that year's Kentucky Derby. She then took on the colts again in the Wood Memorial Stakes, coming in second to Jeep. "The Great Ones," a Blood-Horse book, says of her: "She was a big mare; as big as most of the colts she raced against, tougher than some of them, faster than almost all of them."

Gallorette was running when races for fillies beyond the age of three were limited, and as a result, most of her important races were against male horses. In truth, there were races to run in, but being for females, they carried much smaller purses. (The first $100,000 race for fillies and mares only was the New Castle Handicap (the forerunner of the Delaware Handicap), inaugurated long after Gallorette had retired.) Against females, she took the Acorn Stakes, the Pimlico Oaks, and the Delaware Oaks. Back to racing colts, she carried the same weight and competed in the Dwyer Stakes, losing by a nose to Wildlife. She won the Empire City Handicap, beating the Belmont Stakes winner, Pavot. Gallorette then lost six races in a row.

== Four-year-old season ==
In her four-year-old season, she started out slowly before turning in improved performances. She took the Metropolitan Handicap from Sirde and First Fiddle, won the Nimba Handicap, but was then assigned very high weights. In the Brooklyn Handicap, she was up against the brilliant Stymie. Both of them followed the pace for an entire mile and made their moves at the same time, Stymie coming from a bit further back. At one point Stymie got his head in front, but Gallorette fought back and won.

The rest of the year, she won or was in the money in the Bay Shore Handicap, the Beldame Stakes, the Butler Stakes, the Wilson Stakes, the Edgemere Handicap, the Sysonby Purse, and the Mass Cap. She won the Queens County Handicap when she was five in 1947.

== Later years ==
In 1948, six-year-old Gallorette won the Carter Handicap, the Whitney Stakes and the Wilson Stakes. She had already won the Wilson Stakes in 1947 but came back to win the August 3, 1948 race in a track record time of 1:35 2/5.

On September 1, 1948, Gallorette was sold to Mrs. Marie A. Moore of Virginia. The selling price was variously reported between $125,000 and $150,000.

During her five years of racing—between 1944 and 1948— Gallorette won or placed in 54 of her 72 starts. She competed against future Hall of Famers Armed and Stymie, as well as U.S. Triple Crown champion Assault. Blood-Horse magazine describes the years during which Gallorette ran as one of the deepest handicap divisions ever seen in American thoroughbred racing.

== Honors ==
Gallorette was voted Champion female horse for 1946. In a poll among members of the American Trainers Association, conducted in 1955 by Delaware Park Racetrack, she was voted the greatest filly in American racing history. In 1962, she was inducted into the National Museum of Racing and Hall of Fame, where her portrait by Richard Stone Reeves is part of the museum's collection. In The Blood-Horse ranking of the top 100 U.S. thoroughbred champions of the 20th Century, Gallorette is ranked #45. She is ranked as the third highest female horse in the century. The highest ranked female, at #35, is Ruffian.

Pimlico Race Course named a Graded stakes race in her honor. The Gallorette Handicap is run annually on the same card as the Preakness Stakes.

== The Complete ATA Poll ==
1. Gallorette -- (1942) -- 72:21-20-13 --- $445,000
2. Twilight Tear -- (1941) -- 24:18-2-2 --- $202,165
3. Regret -- (1912) -- 11:9-1-0 --- $35,093
4. Top Flight -- (1929) -- 16:12-0-0 --- $275,900
5. Miss Woodford -- (1880) -- 48:37-7-2 --- $118,270
6. Busher -- (1942) -- 21:15-3-1 --- $334,035
7. Beldame -- (1901) -- 31:17-6-4 --- $102,570
8. Princess Doreen -- (1921) -- 94:34-15-17 --- $174,745
9. Bewitch - - (1945) -- 55:20-10-11 --- $462,605*
10. Imp -- (1894) -- 171:62-35-29 --- $70,119
- surpassed Gallorette's earnings

== Broodmare ==
Gallorette retired after the 1948 season as the all-time leading money winner among females. Although not one of the great broodmares, she did produce two stakes-winning fillies, and among her descendants are the U.S. Horses of the Year Saint Liam and Gun Runner (horse).

Gallorette died at the age of 17 at Moore's Virginia farm in 1959. In her career, she earned $445,535.

Eddie "Cocky" Simms, who broke Gallorette and worked with her for her trainer Ed Christmas, told Blood-Horse, "She's not only the greatest mare, but the greatest Maryland-bred of any sex...She had a long, tough, career as a race mare, but if the jocks would have ridden her as instructed, she would have won a million instead of half a million."
