= Challedon =

Thoroughbred racehorse

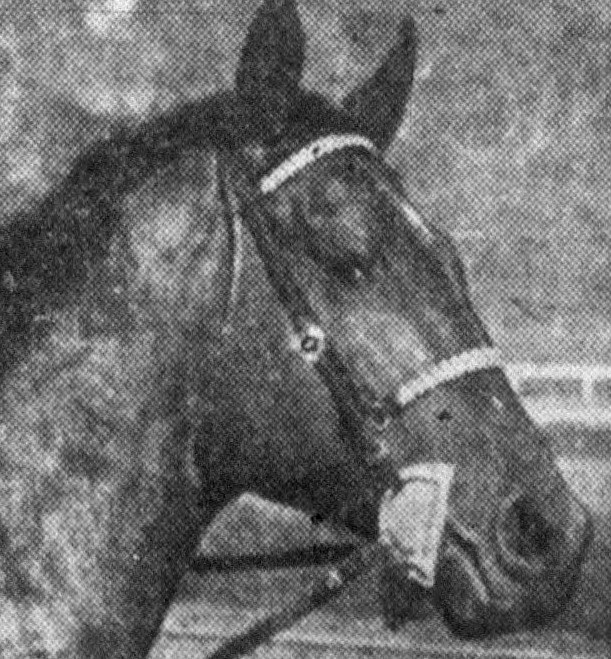
- Challedon, circa 1942
- Sire: Challenger II
- Grandsire: Swynford
- Dam: Laura Gal
- Damsire: Sir Gallahad III
- Sex: Stallion
- Foaled: 1936
- Country: United States
- Color: Bay
- Breeder: William L. Brann & Robert S. Castle
- Owner: Branncastle Farm
- Trainer: 1) Louis Schaefer; 2) Don Cameron; 3) L. T. "Whitey" Whitehill; 4) Edward Christmas
- Record: 44: 20-7-6
- Earnings: $334,660

Major wins
- New England Futurity (1938); Pimlico Futurity (1938); Maryland Futurity (1938; Arlington Classic (1939); Hawthorne Gold Cup Handicap (1939); Havre de Grace Handicap (1939, 1940); Narragansett Special (1939); Pimlico Special (1939, 1940); Yankee Handicap (1939); Hollywood Gold Cup (1940); Whitney Stakes (1940); Philadelphia Handicap (1942); U.S. Triple Crown series: Preakness Stakes (1939)

Awards
- American Champion Three-Year-Old Colt (1939); American Horse of the Year (1939, 1940); American Champion Older Male Horse (1940)

Honors
- United States Racing Hall of Fame (1977) #38 - Top 100 U.S. Racehorses of the 20th Century; Challedon Stakes at Laurel Park
- Last updated on October 28, 2006

Challedon (1936–1958) was an American Hall of Fame Champion Thoroughbred racehorse. Bred in Maryland by William L. Brann and Robert S. Castle, he raced under the colors of their Branncastle Farm.

== Two-year-old-season ==
Racing at age two, Challedon won four of his six but was outshone by another colt named El Chico, who was voted that year's U.S. Champion 2-Yr-Old Colt.

== Three-year-old-season ==
At age three, under jockey George Seabo, Challedon finished second in the 1939 Kentucky Derby, eight lengths behind future Hall of Fame colt Johnstown. Then, in the Preakness Stakes, Challedon won by a length and a half with the heavily favored Johnstown finishing off the board. For trainer Louis J. Schaefer, Challedon's win meant he became the first person to have both ridden and trained a Preakness Stakes winner. His feat would only be matched 30 years later by Johnny Longden. Challedon wasn't eligible to compete in the final leg of the U.S. Triple Crown and as such Johnstown had an easy time in winning the Belmont Stakes. However, Challedon's wins in eight other important races that year, including a world record performance in the Tranter Purse raced at Keeneland Race Course, earned him the U.S. Champion 3-Yr-Old Colt honors. In a poll conducted by the Turf and Sport Digest, Challedon was voted Horse of the Year, taking 156 of the possible 208 votes ahead of the two-year-old Bimelech, who received 36.

== Four-year-old-season ==
In 1940, the four-year-old Challedon continued his winning ways, claiming victory under jockey George Woolf in the Hollywood Gold Cup and the Whitney Stakes. Beginning in September 1940, Don Cameron trained Challedon for owner William L. Brann and won the Pimlico Special and Havre de Grace Handicap. Challedon still remains the only two-time winner of the prestigious grade one Pimlico Special Handicap. Cameron left Brann's employ in February 1941 and the horse's training was taken over by Whitey Whitehill. Challedon was voted 1940 U.S. Champion Male Handicap Horse and for the second straight year earned U.S. Horse of the Year honors, topping the Turf and Sport Digest poll with 84 votes ahead of Seabiscuit who received 34.

== Five-year-old season ==
As a five-year-old, Challedon suffered a tendon injury and was bothered by cracks on the inside of a forefoot that saw him win no purse money. His season ended after just three races. The following year, for new trainer Edward Christmas Challedon returned to the winner's circle twice, including in the Philadelphia Handicap, but had lost his drive and was retired to stand at stud at Gallaher Farm in Lexington, Kentucky.

While not a spectacular success as a sire, Challedon did produce thirteen stakes winners before dying at the age of twenty-two after breaking a leg in his paddock. In 1977, he was inducted into the United States' National Museum of Racing and Hall of Fame.

== Breeding ==
Pedigree of Challedon
Sire Challenger bay 1927	Swynford brown 1907	John O'Gaunt	Isinglass*
Sire Challenger bay 1927	Swynford brown 1907	John O'Gaunt	La Fleche
Sire Challenger bay 1927	Swynford brown 1907	Canterbury Pilgrim	Tristan
Sire Challenger bay 1927	Swynford brown 1907	Canterbury Pilgrim	Pilgrimage
Sire Challenger bay 1927	Sword Play brown 1921	Great Sport	Gallinule
Sire Challenger bay 1927	Sword Play brown 1921	Great Sport	Gondolette
Sire Challenger bay 1927	Sword Play brown 1921	Flash of Steel	Royal Realm
Sire Challenger bay 1927	Sword Play brown 1921	Flash of Steel	Flaming Vixen
Dam Laura Gal bay 1929	Sir Gallahad bay 1920	Teddy	Ajax
Dam Laura Gal bay 1929	Sir Gallahad bay 1920	Teddy	Rondeau
Dam Laura Gal bay 1929	Sir Gallahad bay 1920	Plucky Liege	Spearmint
Dam Laura Gal bay 1929	Sir Gallahad bay 1920	Plucky Liege	Concertina
Dam Laura Gal bay 1929	Laura Dianti bay 1923	Wrack	Robert le Diable
Dam Laura Gal bay 1929	Laura Dianti bay 1923	Wrack	Samphire*
Dam Laura Gal bay 1929	Laura Dianti bay 1923	Lady Errant	Knight Errant
Dam Laura Gal bay 1929	Laura Dianti bay 1923	Lady Errant	Outcome

* Challedon is inbred 4S x 5D to the stallion Isinglass, meaning that he appears fourth generation on the sire side of his pedigree, and fifth generation (via Samfire) on the dam side of his pedigree.
