= William L. Brann =

American businessman (c. 1877–1951)

William Leavitt Brann
- Born: c. 1877; Washington, Indiana, United States
- Died: April 11, 1951; Boynton Beach, Florida, United States
- Education: Indiana University
- Occupations: Advertising executive, Racehorse owner/breeder
- Known for: Challedon, Gallorette
- Board member of: W. L. Brann Advertising Agency
- Spouse: Mabel Vreeland
- Children: 1) William Leavitt Jr. (1916-1998), 2) Mary Elizabeth

William Leavitt Brann (c. 1877 – April 11, 1951) was an American businessman and Thoroughbred racehorse owner and breeder.

Born in Washington, Indiana, William Brann graduated from Indiana University Bloomington and moved to New York City where he founded the W. L. Brann Advertising Agency, serving national clients such as Montgomery Ward.

== Thoroughbred racing ==
In partnership with Robert Stanley Castle, William Brann owned Branncastle Farm in Walkersville in Frederick County, Maryland. Among the successful horses they bred was Challedon, the 1939 and 1940 American Horse of the Year and a U.S. Racing Hall of Fame inductee. Challedon became the first Maryland-bred and Maryland-owned winner of Maryland's Preakness Stakes since Cloverbrook in 1877. Robert Castle's health problems, that led to his death in May 1948, saw him give up racing and William Brann then operated under the name Glade Valley Farm.

William Brann also owned Gallorette whom he raced with great success in 1945 through 1948. Ranked as one of the top three mares in American racing during the 20th century, Gallorette was the 1946 American Champion Older Female Horse and was also inducted in the U.S. Racing Hall of Fame. Brann owned a large number of runners during his years in racing including Escadru, Pictor, Vincentive, and Legendra. Trainers who conditioned his horses included Don Cameron, Edward Christmas, and Louis Schaefer.

Willam and Mabel Brann maintained a winter home in Boynton Beach, Florida where he died in 1951 at the age of seventy-three.
