= Pimlico Special top three finishers =

This is a listing of the horses that finished in either first, second, or third place and the number of starters in the Pimlico Special Handicap, one of America's grade one handicap races run over dirt at 1-1/16 miles at Pimlico Race Course in Baltimore, Maryland.

Year	Winner	Second	Third	Starters
2026	Navajo Warrior	Maclean’s Rook	San Siro	7
2025	Awesome Aaron	Phileas Fogg	Star Of Wonder	9
2024	Pyreness	Kingsbarns	Harlocap	7
2023	Rattle N Roll	Speed Bias	Clapton	7
2022	First Captain	Vindictive	Untreated	10
2021	Last Judgement	Modernist	Fearless	11
2020	Harpers First Ride	Owendale	Cordmaker	9
2019	Tenfold	You're to Blame	Cordmaker	13
2018	Irish War Cry	One Liner	Untrapped	9
2017	Shaman Ghost	Dolphus	Conquest Windycity	10
2016	Noble Bird	Idolo Porteno	Warrioroftheroses	8
2015	Commissioner	Page McKenney	Cat Burglar	10
2014	Revolutionary	Prayer for Relief	Cat Burglar	9
2013	Last Gunfighter	Eighttofasttocatch	Richard's Kid	7
2012	Alternation	Nehro	Endorsement	9
2011	No Race	No Race	No Race	0
2010	No Race	No Race	No Race	0
2009	No Race	No Race	No Race	0
2008	Student Council	Gottcha Gold	Sir Whimsey	8
2007	No Race	No Race	No Race	0
2006	Invasor	Wanderin Boy	West Virginia	5
2005	Eddington	Pollard's Vision	Presidential Affair	7
2004	Southern Image	Midway Road	Bowman's Band	6
2003	Mineshaft	Western Pride	Judge's Case	9
2002	No Race	No Race	No Race	0
2001	Include	Albert the Great	Pleasant Breeze	6
2000	Golden Missile	Pleasant Breeze	Lemon Drop Kid	8
1999	Real Quiet	Free House	Fred Bear Claw	5
1998	Skip Away	Precosity	Hot Brush	5
1997	Gentlemen	Skip Away	Tejano Run	8
1996	Star Standard	Key of Luck	Geri	4
1995	Cigar	Devil His Due	Concern	6
1994	As Indicated	Devil His Due	Valley Crossing	6
1993	Devil His Due	Valley Crossing	Pistols and Roses	6
1992	Strike the Gold	Fly So Free	Twilight Agenda	7
1991	Farma Way	Summer Squall	Jolie's Halo	7
1990	Criminal Type	Ruhlmann	De Roche	10
1989	Blushing John	Proper Reality	Granacus	12
1988	Bet Twice	Lost Code	Cryptoclearance	6
1959	1987	No Race	No Race	0
1958	Vertex	Sharpsburg	Beter Bee	n/a
1957	Promised Land	Tick Tock	Third Br'th'r	n/a
1956	Summer Tan	Midafternoon	Find	n/a
1955	Sailor	Mister Gus	Social Outcast	n/a
1954	Helioscope	Hasseyampa	Fisherman	n/a
1953	Tom Fool	Navy Page	Alerted	n/a
1952	General Staff	One Hitter	Call Over	n/a
1951	Bryan G.	County Delight	Call Over	n/a
1950	One Hitter	Chicle II	Abstract	n/a
1949	Capot	Coaltown	no other runners	n/a
1948	Citation	no other runners	no other runners	n/a
1947	Fervent	Cosmic Bomb	Armed	n/a
1946	Assault	Stymie	Bridle Flower	n/a
1945	Armed	First Fiddle	Stymie	n/a
1944	Twilight Tear	Devil Diver	Megogo	n/a
1943	Shut Out	Slide Rule	F. Manhurst	n/a
1942	Whirlaway	no other runners	no other runners	n/a
1941	Market Wise	Haltal	no other runners	n/a
1940	Challedon	Can't Wait	no other runners	n/a
1939	Challedon	Kayak II	Cravat	n/a
1938	Seabiscuit	War Admiral	no other runners	n/a
1937	War Admiral	Masked General	War Minstrel	n/a

== See also ==
- List of graded stakes at Pimlico Race Course
