= 1980 Preakness Stakes =

105th running of the Preakness Stakes

105th Preakness Stakes
- The Preakness Stakes
- Location: Pimlico Race Course, Baltimore, Maryland, United States
- Date: May 17, 1980
- Winning horse: Codex
- Jockey: Ángel Cordero Jr.
- Conditions: Fast
- Surface: Dirt

The 1980 Preakness Stakes was the 105th running of the $250,000 Grade 1 Preakness Stakes thoroughbred horse race. The race took place on May 17, 1980, and was televised in the United States on the ABC television network. Codex, who was jockeyed by Ángel Cordero Jr., won the race by four and three quarter lengths over runner-up Genuine Risk. Approximate post time was 5:40 p.m. Eastern Time. The race was run on a fast track in a final time of 1:54-1/5. The Maryland Jockey Club reported total attendance of 83,455, this is recorded as second highest on the list of American thoroughbred racing top attended events for North America in 1980.

== Payout ==
The 105th Preakness Stakes Payout Schedule

Program Number	Horse Name	Win	Place	Show
3	Codex	US$7.40	$3.60	$3.80
5	Genuine Risk	-	$3.60	$2.80
4	Colonel Moran	-	-	$3.40

$2 Exacta: (3–5) paid $19.60

== The full chart ==
Finish Position	Margin (lengths)	Post Position	Horse name	Jockey	Trainer	Owner	Post Time Odds	Purse Earnings
1st	0	3	Codex	Ángel Cordero Jr.	D. Wayne Lukas	Tartan Stable	2.70-1	$180,600
2nd	43/4	5	Genuine Risk	Jacinto Vásquez	LeRoy Jolley	Bertram R. Firestone	2.00-1 favorite	$40,000
3rd	8	4	Colonel Moran	Jorge Velásquez	Thomas J. Kelly	Townsend B. Martin	2.20-1	$20,000
4th	15	7	Jaklin Klugman	Darrel McHargue	Riley S. Cofer	Jack Klugman	4.20-1	$10,000
5th	221/4	6	Bing	Danny R. Wright	Gordon Speck	Bill V. Neff	63.10-1	
6th	24	2	Samoyed	Arnold Iliecu	Judith H. Zouck	Judith H. Zouck	20.60-1	
7th	281/2	1	Knight Landing	William J. Passmore	James W. Murphy	J. Kennon Perrin	60.00-1	
8th	371/2	8	Lucky Pluck	Bobby Ussery	James W. Robinson Jr.	Don Fenters Jr.	77.70-1	

- Winning Breeder: Tartan Farms; (FL)
- Winning Time: 1:54 1/5
- Track Condition: Fast
- Total Attendance: 83,455
