= Codex (horse) =

American-bred Thoroughbred racehorse

- Sire: Arts And Letters
- Grandsire: Ribot
- Dam: Roundup Rose
- Damsire: Minnesota Mac
- Sex: Stallion
- Foaled: 1977
- Country: United States
- Colour: Chestnut
- Breeder: Tartan Stable
- Owner: Tartan Stable
- Trainer: D. Wayne Lukas
- Record: 15: 6-2-1
- Earnings: $534,576

Major wins
- Santa Anita Derby (1980); Hollywood Derby (1980); American Classic Race wins: Preakness Stakes (1980)

Codex (February 28, 1977 – August 20, 1984) was an American thoroughbred racehorse who won the 1980 Preakness Stakes. He was foaled in Florida out of the Minnesota Mac mare, Roundup Rose, sired by the 1969 American Horse of the Year, Arts And Letters.

== Triple Crown races ==
Trained by D. Wayne Lukas, Codex was considered the dominant 3-year-old colt in California after winning the 1980 Santa Anita Derby and Hollywood Derby. The horse's owner, John Nerud, believed Triple Crown races could harm a horse and did not allow Lukas to nominate Codex for the 1980 Kentucky Derby.

Lukas initially declined to nominate Codex for the 1980 Preakness Stakes but the horse was entered accidentally by Lukas' 22-year-old son, Jeff, who worked as the assistant trainer. Codex, ridden by Ángel Cordero Jr., beat the Kentucky Derby-winning filly, Genuine Risk by 4 3/4 lengths in the 1980 Preakness Stakes, becoming Lukas' first Triple Crown-race winner. The victory was challenged by Genuine Risk's owners on grounds of deliberate interference by Cordero. Television replays showed Cordero swing Codex wide and possibly brush against Genuine Risk. One of Codex's lawyers, Arnold M. Weiner, displayed photos showing the horses almost feet apart in contrast to the television footage. After testimony by dozens of witnesses, the Maryland Racing Commission ruled that any contact was incidental and allowed the result to stand. The controversy increased media attention on the upcoming Belmont Stakes as a rivalry between Codex and Genuine Risk.

At the 1980 Belmont Stakes in sloppy conditions, Codex finished in seventh place. to Temperence Hill; Genuine Risk finished second.

== Retirement ==
Codex was retired after a career of six wins in fifteen starts. Codex produced three good crops of foals before being found in his stall, paralyzed. On August 20, 1984, he was euthanized.

From Codex's 1982 (first) crop came Tartan Stable's Coup de Fusil who emulated her sire by winning three straight Grade I races. From his 1983 crop, came the Grade I winner Badger Land. The 1984 (last) crop was highlighted by Lost Code, who won several Graded Stakes including 2 Grade 1 races.

== Breeding ==
Pedigree of Codex
Sire Arts and Letters ch. 1966	Ribot brown 1952	Tenerani	Bellini
Sire Arts and Letters ch. 1966	Ribot brown 1952	Tenerani	Tofanella
Sire Arts and Letters ch. 1966	Ribot brown 1952	Romanella	El Greco
Sire Arts and Letters ch. 1966	Ribot brown 1952	Romanella	Barbara Burrini
Sire Arts and Letters ch. 1966	All Beautiful ch. 1959	Battlefield	War Relic
Sire Arts and Letters ch. 1966	All Beautiful ch. 1959	Battlefield	Dark Display
Sire Arts and Letters ch. 1966	All Beautiful ch. 1959	Parlo	Heliopolis*
Sire Arts and Letters ch. 1966	All Beautiful ch. 1959	Parlo	Fairy Palace
Dam Roundup Rose bay 1971	Minnesota Mac bay 1964	Rough'n Tumble	Free For All
Dam Roundup Rose bay 1971	Minnesota Mac bay 1964	Rough'n Tumble	Roused
Dam Roundup Rose bay 1971	Minnesota Mac bay 1964	Cow Girl	Mustang
Dam Roundup Rose bay 1971	Minnesota Mac bay 1964	Cow Girl	Ate
Dam Roundup Rose bay 1971	Minnetonka bay 1967	Chieftain	Bold Ruler
Dam Roundup Rose bay 1971	Minnetonka bay 1967	Chieftain	Pocahontas
Dam Roundup Rose bay 1971	Minnetonka bay 1967	Heliolight	Helioscope*
Dam Roundup Rose bay 1971	Minnetonka bay 1967	Heliolight	Real Delight

* Codex is inbred 4S x 5D to the stallion Heliopolis, meaning that he appears fourth generation on the sire side of his pedigree and fifth generation (via Helioscope) on the dam side of his pedigree.
