= Pimlico Special =

- Class: Grade III
- Location: Pimlico Race Course, Baltimore, Maryland, United States
- Inaugurated: 1937
- Race type: Thoroughbred – Flat racing
- Website: www.pimlico.com

Race information
- Distance: 1 3/16 miles (9 1/2 furlongs)
- Surface: Dirt
- Track: left-handed
- Qualification: 3-years-old & Up
- Weight: Base weights with allowances: 4-year-olds and up: 126 lbs. 3-year-olds: 119 lbs.
- Purse: $250,000 (2024)

The Pimlico Special is a Grade 3 American thoroughbred horse race for horses age three and older over a distance of 1 3/16 miles (9 1/2 furlongs) held at Pimlico Race Course in Baltimore, Maryland in mid May. The race currently offers a purse of $250,000.

== History ==
The Pimlico Special was first run in 1937 and was won by that year's U.S. Triple Crown winner War Admiral who went on to be voted the American Horse of the Year. In 1938, the Pimlico Special was host to one of American racing's most historic moments when Seabiscuit defeated War Admiral in a much anticipated match race. That race was covered by almost every major newspaper, magazine and radio station of the time.

Discontinued after 1958, the race was revived as a handicap event in 1988 and made a graded stakes race one year later in 1989. The race was not eligible for grading in 2011 because it had not been run the previous two years.

Eighteen Pimlico Special winners have gone on to win a Championship for Horse of the Year or an Eclipse Award as the best horse in their divisions. The latest was Invasor in 2006; others include Mineshaft, Real Quiet, Skip Away, Cigar, Criminal Type, Blushing John, Tom Fool, Capot, Citation, Assault, Armed, Twilight Tear, Whirlaway, Market Wise, Challedon, Seabiscuit and War Admiral.

The Pimlico track record for 1 3/16 miles is held by Farma Way who ran the distance in 1:52 2/5 while capturing the 1991 Pimlico Special.

Farma Way joined Riva Ridge who set the same record for the same time and distance on dirt at Aqueduct Racetrack in 1973.

In his fourth year, the Farma Way colt won the Santa Anita Handicap and set a 1 3/16 mile track record for Pimlico Race Course in winning the 1991 Pimlico Special. His time of 1:52 2/5 also equaled the North American record for 1 3/16 miles on dirt set by Riva Ridge in 1973 at Aqueduct Racetrack. As of January 2008, their record still stands.

== Records ==
Speed record:

- 1:52.55 – Farma Way (1991) (at current distance of 1 3/16 miles; time recognised by Equibase based on hundredths)

Most wins by a horse:

- 2 – Challedon (1939 & 1940)

Most wins by a jockey:

- 4 – Eddie Arcaro (1939, 1943, 1946, 1948)

Most wins by a trainer:

- 4 – Ben A. Jones (1942, 1944, 1945, 1947)
- 4 – John M. Gaver Sr. (1943, 1949, 1950, 1953)

Most wins by an owner:

- 6 – Calumet Farm (1942, 1944, 1945, 1947, 1948, 1990)

== Winners of the "Pimlico Special" since 1937 ==
Year	Winner	Age	Jockey	Trainer	Owner	Distance	Time	Purse	Grade
2026	Navajo Warrior	5	Flavien Prat	Saffie A. Joseph Jr.	BAG Racing Stables, Miller Racing, Dr. Derek K. Paul, Mathis Stable, Paul Braverman & Timothy Pinch	1 3/16	1:56.61	$250,000	III
2025	Awesome Aaron	6	John R. Velazquez	Norm W. Casse	Turman Racing Stable & AJ Suited Racing Stable	1 3/16	1:56.67	$250,000	III
2024	Pyrenees	4	Brian Hernandez Jr.	Cherie DeVaux	Blue Heaven Farm	1 3/16	1:57.73	$250,000	III
2023	Rattle N Roll	4	Flavien Prat	Kenneth G. McPeek	Lucky Seven Stable	1 3/16	1:54.72	$250,000	III
2022	First Captain	4	Luis Saez	Claude R. McGaughey III	Bobby Flay, Woodford Racing, Siena Farm, & West Point Thoroughbreds	1 3/16	1:56.24	$250,000	III
2021	Last Judgment	5	Jose L. Ortiz	Michael J. Maker	Bethlehem Stables	1 3/16	1:54.37	$250,000	III
2020	Harpers First Ride	4	Angel Cruz	Claudio A. Gonzalez	MCA Racing Stable LLC	1 3/16	1:54.97	$250,000	III
2019	Tenfold	4	Ricardo Santana	Steve Asmussen	Winchell Thoroughbreds	1 1/4	2:02.36	$300,000	III
2018	Irish War Cry	4	José Ortiz	H. Graham Motion	Isabelle de Tomaso	1 3/16	1:55.51	$300,000	III
2017	Shaman Ghost	5	Javier Castellano	Jimmy Jerkens	Stronach Stables	1 3/16	1:54.55	$300,000	III
2016	Noble Bird	5	Julien Leparoux	Mark E. Casse	John C. Oxley	1 3/16	1:55.18	$300,000	III
2015	Commissioner	5	Javier Castellano	Todd Pletcher	WinStar Farm	1 3/16	1:56.09	$300,000	III
2014	Revolutionary	4	Mike E. Smith	Todd Pletcher	WinStar Farm	1 3/16	1:55.99	$300,000	III
2013	Last Gunfighter	4	Javier Castellano	Chad Brown	John D. Gunther	1 3/16	1:58.50	$300,000	III
2012	Alternation	4	Luis Quinonez	Donnie K. Von Hemel	Pin Oak Stable	1 3/16	1:57.60	$300,000	III
2009–11	Race not held								
2008	Student Council	6	Shaun Bridgmohan	Steve Asmussen	Millennium Farms	1 3/16	1:54.87	$250,000	I
2007	Race not held								
2006	Invasor	4	Ramon Domínguez	Kiaran McLaughlin	Shadwell Stable	1 3/16	1:54.40	$500,000	I
2005	Eddington	4	Eibar Coa	Mark A. Hennig	Willmott Stables	1 3/16	1:58.05	$500,000	I
2004	Southern Image	4	Victor Espinoza	Michael Machowsky	Blahut Stables	1 3/16	1:55.89	$600,000	I
2003	Mineshaft	4	Robby Albarado	Neil J. Howard	Farish/Webber/Elkins	1 3/16	1:56.16	$600,000	I
2002	Race not held								
2001	Include	4	Jerry Bailey	Bud Delp	Brereton C. Jones	1 3/16	1:55.61	$750,000	I
2000	Golden Missile	5	Kent Desormeaux	Joe Orseno	Frank Stronach	1 3/16	1:54.65	$750,000	I
1999	Real Quiet	4	Gary Stevens	Bob Baffert	Michael E. Pegram	1 3/16	1:54.31	$750,000	I
1998	Skip Away	5	Jerry Bailey	Sonny Hine	Carolyn Hine	1 3/16	1:54.20	$750,000	I
1997	Gentlemen	5	Gary Stevens	Richard Mandella	Randall Dee Hubbard	1 3/16	1:53.03	$600,000	I
1996	Star Standard	4	Pat Day	Nick Zito	William Condren	1 3/16	1:54.40	$600,000	I
1995	Cigar	5	Jerry Bailey	William I. Mott	Allen E. Paulson	1 3/16	1:53.60	$600,000	I
1994	As Indicated	4	Robbie Davis	Richard Schosberg	Heatherwood Farm	1 3/16	1:55.00	$600,000	I
1993	Devil His Due	4	Herb McCauley	H. Allen Jerkens	Edith LiButti	1 3/16	1:55.40	$600,000	I
1992	Strike the Gold	4	Craig Perret	Nick Zito	BCC Stable	1 3/16	1:54.80	$700,000	I
1991	Farma Way	4	Gary Stevens	D. Wayne Lukas	Quarter B Farm	1 3/16	1:52.40	$750,000	I
1990	Criminal Type	5	José A. Santos	D. Wayne Lukas	Calumet/J. K. Arnemann	1 3/16	1:53.00	$1,000,000	I
1989	Blushing John	4	Ángel Cordero Jr.	Richard J. Lundy	Allen E. Paulson	1 3/16	1:53.20	$700,000	II
1988	Bet Twice	4	Craig Perret	Warren A. Croll Jr.	Blanche P. Levy	1 3/16	1:54.20	$710,000	
1959–87	Race not held								
1958	Vertex	4	Sam Boulmetis Sr.	Joseph F. Piarulli	J. J. Brunetti/F. A. Piarulli	1 3/16	2:00.60	$60,000	
1957	Promised Land	3	Bill Hartack	Hirsch Jacobs	Ethel D. Jacobs	1 3/16	1:57.40	$60,000	
1956	Summer Tan	4	Dave Erb	Sherrill W. Ward	Mrs. J. W. Galbreath	1 3/16	1:56.60	$60,000	
1955	Sailor II	3	Hedley Woodhouse	Preston M. Burch	Isabel Dodge Sloane	1 3/16	1:57.60	$66,500	
1954	Helioscope	‡3	Sam Boulmetis Sr.	Howard Hausner	William G. Helis Jr.	1 3/16	1:59.00	$60,000	
1953	Tom Fool	4	Ted Atkinson	John M. Gaver Sr.	Greentree Stable	1 3/16	1:55.80	$50,000	
1952	General Staff	4	Glen Lasswell	Jimmy McGee	Larry MacPhail	1 3/16	1:57.40	$41,500	
1951	Bryan G.	4	Ovie Scurlock	Casey Hayes	Meadow Stable	1 3/16	1:57.40	$41,500	
1950	One Hitter	4	Ted Atkinson	John M. Gaver Sr.	Greentree Stable	1 3/16	1:58.60	$25,000	
1949	Capot	4	Ted Atkinson	John M. Gaver Sr.	Greentree Stable	1 3/16	1:56.80	$25,000	
1948	†Citation	3	Eddie Arcaro	Horace A. Jones	Calumet Farm	1 3/16	1:59.80	$25,000	
1947	Fervent	3	Albert Snider	Ben A. Jones	Calumet Farm	1 3/16	1:58.40	$41,500	
1946	Assault	3	Eddie Arcaro	Max Hirsch	King Ranch	1 3/16	1:57.00	$41,500	
1945	Armed	4	Douglas Dodson	Ben A. Jones	Calumet Farm	1 3/16	1:58.80	$41,500	
1944	Twilight Tear	3	Douglas Dodson	Ben A. Jones	Calumet Farm	1 3/16	1:56.60	$41,500	
1943	Shut Out	4	Eddie Arcaro	John M. Gaver Sr.	Greentree Stable	1 3/16	2:00.20	$41,500	
1942	†Whirlaway	4	George Woolf	Ben A. Jones	Calumet Farm	1 3/16	2:00.40	$16,500	
1941	Market Wise	3	Wendell Eads	George W. Carroll	Louis Tufano	1 3/16	1:58.80	$16,500	
1940	Challedon	4	George Woolf	Don Cameron	Branncastle Farm	1 3/16	2:03.20	$16,500	
1939	Challedon	3	Eddie Arcaro	Louis Schaefer	Branncastle Farm	1 3/16	1:59.00	$16,500	
1938	Seabiscuit	5	George Woolf	Tom Smith	Charles S. Howard	1 3/16	1:56.60	$25,000	
1937	War Admiral	‡3	Charley Kurtsinger	George Conway	Glen Riddle Farm	1 3/16	1:58.80	$10,000	

Notes:

- ‡ For 3-yr-olds in 1937 and 1954
- † Won by Walkovers in 1942 and 1948

== See also ==
- Pimlico Special "top three finishers" and starters
- Preakness Stakes
- Black-Eyed Susan Stakes
- Pimlico Race Course
- List of graded stakes at Pimlico Race Course
