= Tapwrit =

American Thoroughbred racehorse

- Sire: Tapit
- Grandsire: Pulpit
- Dam: Appealing Zophie
- Damsire: Successful Appeal
- Sex: Colt
- Foaled: March 28, 2014
- Country: United States
- Colour: Gray
- Breeder: My Meadowview
- Owner: Bridlewood Farm, Eclipse Thoroughbred Partners & Robert LaPenta
- Trainer: Todd Pletcher
- Record: 13: 4-1-1
- Earnings: $1,362,402

Major wins
- Pulpit Stakes (2016); Tampa Bay Derby (2017) Triple Crown Race wins: Belmont Stakes (2017)

Tapwrit (foaled March 28, 2014) is a retired American Thoroughbred racehorse who won the 2017 Belmont Stakes. He first attracted attention when he set a track record winning the Tampa Bay Derby, but disappointed in the Blue Grass Stakes and Kentucky Derby. Skipping the Preakness Stakes, he then became his sire Tapit's third winner of the Belmont Stakes in the previous four years. Retired in 2018, Tapwrit stands at Gainesway Farm for the 2019 season.

== Background ==
Tapwrit is a gray colt, a color he inherited from leading sire Tapit, whose other offspring include the 2014 and 2016 Belmont Stakes winners Tonalist and Creator, and 2015 Belmont Stakes runner-up Frosted. Tapwrit's dam is Appealing Zophie, a Grade I stakes winner by Successful Appeal.

Tapwrit was bred by My Meadowview LLC, which is owned by the chairman of Barnes & Noble, Leonard Riggio. He was foaled at Three Chimneys Farm but was moved to Denali Stud with his dam. From an early age, he stood out to his handlers at Denali Stud. "He was a big, strong baby, and conformation-wise he was always really good", said farm manager Gary Bush. He was sold as a yearling at the 2015 Fasig-Tipton select yearling sale for $1.2 million to a large ownership group consisting of Bridlewood Farm, Eclipse Thoroughbred Partners and Robert LaPenta.

Tapwrit is trained by Hall of Fame member Todd Pletcher.

== Racing career ==
=== 2016: two-year-old season ===
Tapwrit made his first start on September 3, 2016, in a 7-furlong maiden special weight race at Saratoga Race Course. He chased the early pace but tired in the stretch to finish last. His owners were disappointed. "I think the general consensus that day was a severe case of nausea to be honest", said Aron Wellman of Eclipse Thoroughbreds a few months later. "We had realistic expectations in terms of knowing that he probably wasn't the type of horse that was going to fire first time out. But to say that he would show as little as he did that day, I would be lying if I said we expected that – nor would we have ever run him had we expected that."

Tapwrit made his next start on November 6 at Gulfstream Park West at a distance of one mile. He again stalked the pace then started closing ground on the turn. He dueled down the stretch with Commandeering and edged away near the wire to win by a length.

Tapwrit made his final start of the year in the Pulpit Stakes at Gulfstream Park. The race is normally run on the turf, but Tapwrit was a "main track only" entry, meaning he would not have run if the race remained on the turf. When the race was switched to a sloppy dirt course after heavy rain, Tapwrit instead became the post time favorite. This time he raced closer to the early pace then started his move on the final turn. He opened up a five length lead in mid-stretch before a late run by Master Plan decreased his winning margin to a length.

=== 2017: three-year-old season ===
Tapwrit began his three-year-old campaign on February 11, 2017, in the Sam F. Davis Stakes at Tampa Bay Downs. Against a field of several leading early contenders for the Kentucky Derby, Tapwrit went off at odds of nearly 10–1. He once again stalked the early pace but was out-kicked in the stretch by McCraken, who went on the win by 1 1/2 lengths with Tapwrit finishing in second.

Tapwrit was next entered in the Tampa Bay Derby on March 11, a race Pletcher had won four of the past five years. Tapwrit was made the heavy favorite and justified his backers' confidence with a 4 1/2 length win while setting a track record. "He broke well and got me into a good position going down the backside, and I knew I was loaded going to the three-eighths pole", said jockey José Ortiz. "I didn't want to get boxed in like I did last time, so I went to the outside, and he was much the best. When he made the lead, he pulled himself up a little bit, waiting for competition. He can go a mile and an eighth, a mile and a quarter. He did it pretty easily today. I think he's going to get much better with each race."

Tapwrit's next start was the Blue Grass Stakes on April 8, where he once again faced off with McCraken, who had missed the Tampa Bay Derby with an injury. The two highly regarded colts were upset though by the lightly regarded Irap, who raced near the early pace and held off the rest of the field down the stretch. Tapwrit was never a factor in the race and finished fifth.

In the 2017 Kentucky Derby on May 6, Tapwrit was dismissed at odds of 27-1 despite analysis that suggested his pedigree was well suited to the distance. Tapwrit (in post position 16) got a poor start when Irish War Cry, in the 17th position, ducked to the inside at the start. Tapwrit was pushed over into McCraken, who then bumped into Classic Empire. All four horses lost ground and were well back in the early running. With a quarter of a mile remaining, Tapwrit was still only in tenth place but started to close ground in the stretch, eventually finishing sixth.

Pletcher did not run Tapwrit in the Preakness Stakes, instead giving the colt five weeks of rest before the 2017 Belmont Stakes on June 10. The Belmont was considered wide open after the winners of the Derby and Preakness bypassed the race, followed by the late withdrawal of two other leading contenders due to injuries. In their absence, Tapwrit became the second favorite at odds of 5-1 behind Irish War Cry at 5–2. This time, Tapwrit broke well and settled a few lengths behind the early leaders. Turning into the stretch, he surged into second place and gradually closed ground on Irish War Cry. As the gap narrowed, Tapwrit started bearing out to the center of the track before Ortiz guided him back towards the rail. In the final strides, Tapwrit began to pull away and ultimately won by two lengths.

It was Pletcher's third win in the Belmont Stakes in the last eleven years. "(Belmont Park is) our home base, and I think that's always an advantage", Pletcher said. "We felt like with the five weeks in between (the Derby and Belmont), and with the way this horse had trained, he had a legitimate chance."

It was the first win of a Triple Crown race for Ortiz, who regularly rides at Belmont Park. "It's an unbelievable feeling that I can't explain", he said. "The distance – I was sure he could handle it. It was a great training job by Todd. I always liked him and had a lot of faith in him. Today he showed up."

Tapwrit was given a long layoff then returned in the Travers Stakes on August 26 at Saratoga, where he was installed as the morning line favorite in a highly competitive field. He settled a few lengths off the early pace and was in good position entering the stretch but failed to close ground on the early leaders and finished fourth. He emerged from the race with an injury to the frog of his right front hoof. "It happens on deep, sandy tracks", said Aron Wellman, president of Eclipse Thoroughbred Partners. "We see it with relative frequency. If anything, it gives us a little more appreciation for his effort in the Travers." Tapwrit was sent to Rood & Riddle Equine Hospital for treatment.

== 2018: four-year-old season ==
Tapwrit finally returned to racing on June 3, 2018, after a layoff of over 9 months. He was made the second favorite in a field of six in an allowance optional claiming race at Belmont Park at a distance of 1 1/16 miles. At the start, Tapwrit hit the side of the gate, then moved into contention with Hoffenheim for the early lead. The two horses battled around the turn and down the stretch before being passed in deep stretch by Timeline. Tapwrit finished third, beaten by 1 1/2 lengths.

Tapwrit made three more starts in 2018, finishing fourth in the Whitney Stakes, fifth in the Suburban and eighth in the Woodward.

== Statistics ==
Date	Age	Distance	Race	Grade	Track	Odds	Field	Finish	Winning Time	Winning (Losing) Margin	Jockey	Ref
Sep 3, 2016	2	7 furlongs	Maiden Special Weight	Maiden	Saratoga	5.20	10	10	1:24.46	(18 3/4) lengths	Javier Castellano	
Nov 6, 2016	2	1 mile	Maiden Special Weight	Maiden	Gulfstream Park West	3.60	7	1	1:38.24	1 length	Eddie Castro	
Dec 10, 2016	2	1 mile	Pulpit Stakes	Black type	Gulfstream Park	1.50	7	1	1:37.65	1 length	Eddie Castro	
Feb 11, 2017	3	1 1/16 miles	Sam F. Davis Stakes	III	Tampa Bay Downs	9.80	9	2	1:42.45	(1 1/2 lengths)	José Ortiz	
Mar 11, 2017	3	1 1/16 miles	Tampa Bay Derby	II	Tampa Bay Downs	1.10	10	1	1:42.36	4 1/2 lengths	José Ortiz	
Apr 8, 2017	3	1 1/8 miles	Blue Grass Stakes	II	Keeneland	2.20	7	5	1:50.39	(11 1/2 lengths)	José Ortiz	
May 6, 2017	3	1 1/4 miles	Kentucky Derby	I	Churchill Downs	27.10	20	6	2:03.59	(10 1/4 lengths)	José Ortiz	
Jun 10, 2017	3	1 1/2 miles	Belmont Stakes	I	Belmont Park	5.30	11	1	2:30.02	2 lengths	José Ortiz	
Aug 26, 2017	3	1 1/4 miles	Travers Stakes	I	Saratoga	6.00	12	4	2:01.19	(8 lengths)	José Ortiz	
Jun 3, 2018	4	1 1/16 miles	Allowance Optional Claiming		Belmont Park	1.35	6	3	1:40.87	(1 1/2 lengths)	Jose Ortiz	
Jul 7, 2018	4	1 1/4 miles	Suburban Stakes	II	Belmont Park	3.30	10	5	1:59.84	(9 3/4 lengths)	José Ortiz	
Aug 4, 2018	4	1 1/8 miles	Whitney Stakes	I	Saratoga	8.10	8	4	1:49.62	(10 1/4 lengths)	John Velazquez	
Sep 1, 2018	4	1 1/8 miles	Woodward Stakes	I	Saratoga	6.70	14	8	1:48.94	(5 3/4 lengths)	John Velazquez	

== Stud career ==
Tapwrit was retired from racing in October 2018 and will stand at Gainesway Farm for the 2019 season.

His stud fee for the 2025 breeding season is $7,500.

Tapwrit will move to the Indiana Stallion Station in Anderson for the 2025 breeding season for an advertised fee of $2,500.

== Pedigree ==
Pedigree of Tapwrit, gray or roan colt, foaled March 28, 2014
Sire Tapit gr. 2001	Pulpit b. 1994	A. P. Indy dkb/br. 1989	Seattle Slew
Sire Tapit gr. 2001	Pulpit b. 1994	A. P. Indy dkb/br. 1989	Weekend Surprise
Sire Tapit gr. 2001	Pulpit b. 1994	Preach b. 1989	Mr. Prospector
Sire Tapit gr. 2001	Pulpit b. 1994	Preach b. 1989	Narrate
Sire Tapit gr. 2001	Tap Your Heels gr. 1996	Unbridled b. 1987	Fappiano
Sire Tapit gr. 2001	Tap Your Heels gr. 1996	Unbridled b. 1987	Gana Facil
Sire Tapit gr. 2001	Tap Your Heels gr. 1996	Ruby Slippers gr. 1982	Nijinsky
Sire Tapit gr. 2001	Tap Your Heels gr. 1996	Ruby Slippers gr. 1982	Moon Glitter
Dam Appealing Zophie dkb/br. 2004	Successful Appeal dkb/br. 1996	Valid Appeal b. 1972	In Reality
Dam Appealing Zophie dkb/br. 2004	Successful Appeal dkb/br. 1996	Valid Appeal b. 1972	Desert Trial
Dam Appealing Zophie dkb/br. 2004	Successful Appeal dkb/br. 1996	Successful Dancer dkb/br. 1989	Fortunate Prospect
Dam Appealing Zophie dkb/br. 2004	Successful Appeal dkb/br. 1996	Successful Dancer dkb/br. 1989	Debonair Dancer
Dam Appealing Zophie dkb/br. 2004	Zophie dkb/br. 1995	Hawkster dkb/br. 1986	Silver Hawk
Dam Appealing Zophie dkb/br. 2004	Zophie dkb/br. 1995	Hawkster dkb/br. 1986	Strait Lane
Dam Appealing Zophie dkb/br. 2004	Zophie dkb/br. 1995	Sodeo Sodeo dkb/br. 1989	Seattle Slew
Dam Appealing Zophie dkb/br. 2004	Zophie dkb/br. 1995	Sodeo Sodeo dkb/br. 1989	Melody Tree (family: 19)

Tapwrit is inbred 4×4 to Seattle Slew, meaning Seattle Slew appears twice in the fourth generation of Tapwrit's pedigree.

== See also ==
- List of racehorses
