= Southern Image =

American-bred Thoroughbred racehorse

- Sire: Halo's Image
- Grandsire: Halo
- Dam: Pleasant Dixie
- Damsire: Dixieland Band
- Sex: Stallion
- Foaled: April 7, 2000
- Country: United States
- Colour: Dark Bay or Brown
- Breeder: Arthur Appleton
- Owner: Tom Kagele, Blahut Stables, and Tepper Racing
- Trainer: Mike Machowsky
- Record: 8: 6-1-1
- Earnings: US$1,843,750

Major wins
- Pimlico Special Handicap(2004); Santa Anita Handicap (2004); Sunshine Millions Classic (2004); Malibu Stakes (2003)

Southern Image (foaled April 7, 2000) is a millionaire American Thoroughbred racehorse and successful sire. He was bred in Florida by Arthur I. Appleton He finished racing with a record of 6-1-1 in 8 starts and earnings of $1,843,750. Southern Image was best known for his 2004 wins in the grade one Pimlico Special and the grade one Santa Anita Handicap which made him the third ever to win both prestigious races on separate coasts of the United States. The others were Farma Way and Seabiscuit. He also won the Florida/California Sunshine Millions Classic and the grade 1 Malibu Stakes.

== Two-year-old season ==
Southern Image was sold as a two-year-old for $300,000, the second-highest-priced horse at the Ocala Breeders' Sale in March 2003 two-year-old in training sale. He raced only once late in his two-year-old season and won a maiden special weight race at 6 1/2 furlongs at Santa Anita Park by three lengths. He earned $28,800.

== Three-year-old season ==
At age three, Southern Image started the season with a third-place finish in a Triple Crown prep race to Breeders' Cup Juvenile runner-up Kafwain in the $150,000 grade two San Vicente Stakes at Santa Anita. During that race, he sustained a slight injury and had to be rested over the next five months. He came back to the track and won an allowance race in August 2003 at 8 1/2 furlongs at Del Mar Racetrack. In December, Southern Image scored his biggest victory of the year in the $250,000 grade two Malibu Stakes at seven furlongs at Santa Anita over Midas Eyes. He finished the year with a record of (3): 2-0-1 and earnings of $202,800.

== Four-year-old season ==
In January 2004, Southern Image won the $1,000,000 stakes called the Sunshine Millions Classic at nine furlongs at Santa Anita by three lengths over Excess Summer and The Judge Sez Who. In March, he won the $1,000,000 grade one Santa Anita Handicap at ten furlongs at Santa Anita Park in a time of 2:01.64 over Island Fashion and Saint Buddy.

In May, Southern Image was shipped 3,000 miles east to run in the $600,000 grade one Pimlico Special at "Old Hilltop" in Baltimore, Maryland. He came into the Special off four straight victories at Santa Anita. The field was depleted on race day by the scratch of dual classic winner Funny Cide. The race also included the Preakness Stakes runner-up Midway Road, grade one winner Evening Attire, graded stakes winner Bowman's Band, and Dynever, who finished third in the prior year's Breeders' Cup Classic.

Southern Image went off as the favorite at 9-5 because of his "Big Cap" score. He broke well and assumed the lead passing the stands for the first time. Going around the famous club house turn at Pimlico Race Course, jockey Victor Espinoza took hold. Throughout the backstretch and around the far turn in a 1/2 mile of :47, Southern Image sat back in second just off the right rear flank of leader Midway Road. At the top of the lane, he fought back a challenge from Bowman's Band and wore down the leader. He recorded a Beyer speed figure of 119 and a #1 on the Ragozian sheets and finished the mile and 3/16 race on dirt in 1:55.4, defeating runner-up Midway Road by 1-1/2 lengths, with third-place finisher Bowman's Band another 2 1/2 lengths behind them.

One month later, Southern Image finished second in the $800,000 grade one Stephen Foster Handicap at Churchill Downs. He lost to Colonial Colony by a nose and defeated multiple graded stakes winner Perfect Drift. He concluded his four-year-old season in 2004 with a record of (4): 3-1-0 and earnings of $1,612,150.

== Retirement ==
Southern Image stands at Taylor Made Farm in Nicholasville, Kentucky. He is also standing during the Southern Hemisphere season at Widden Stud, Australia, beginning in 2006.

== Pedigree ==
Pedigree of Southern Image (USA), dark bay or brown horse 2000
Sire Halo's Image (USA) 1991	Halo (USA); 1969	Hail to Reason	Turn-To
Sire Halo's Image (USA) 1991	Halo (USA); 1969	Hail to Reason	Nothirdchance
Sire Halo's Image (USA) 1991	Halo (USA); 1969	Cosmah	Cosmic Bomb
Sire Halo's Image (USA) 1991	Halo (USA); 1969	Cosmah	Almahmoud
Sire Halo's Image (USA) 1991	Sugar's Image (USA); 1981	Valid Appeal	In Reality
Sire Halo's Image (USA) 1991	Sugar's Image (USA); 1981	Valid Appeal	Desert Trial
Sire Halo's Image (USA) 1991	Sugar's Image (USA); 1981	Sugar Del	Crozier
Sire Halo's Image (USA) 1991	Sugar's Image (USA); 1981	Sugar Del	Best Answer
Dam Pleasant Dixie (USA) 1995	Dixieland Band (USA); 1980	Northern Dancer	Nearctic
Dam Pleasant Dixie (USA) 1995	Dixieland Band (USA); 1980	Northern Dancer	Natalma
Dam Pleasant Dixie (USA) 1995	Dixieland Band (USA); 1980	Mississippi Mud	Delta Judge
Dam Pleasant Dixie (USA) 1995	Dixieland Band (USA); 1980	Mississippi Mud	Sand Buggy
Dam Pleasant Dixie (USA) 1995	Pleasant Jolie (USA); 1988	Pleasant Colony	His Majesty
Dam Pleasant Dixie (USA) 1995	Pleasant Jolie (USA); 1988	Pleasant Colony	Sun Colony
Dam Pleasant Dixie (USA) 1995	Pleasant Jolie (USA); 1988	Jolie Jolie	Sir Ivor
Dam Pleasant Dixie (USA) 1995	Pleasant Jolie (USA); 1988	Jolie Jolie	Who's to Know (Family 13-c)
