= Exclusive Native =

American-bred Thoroughbred racehorse

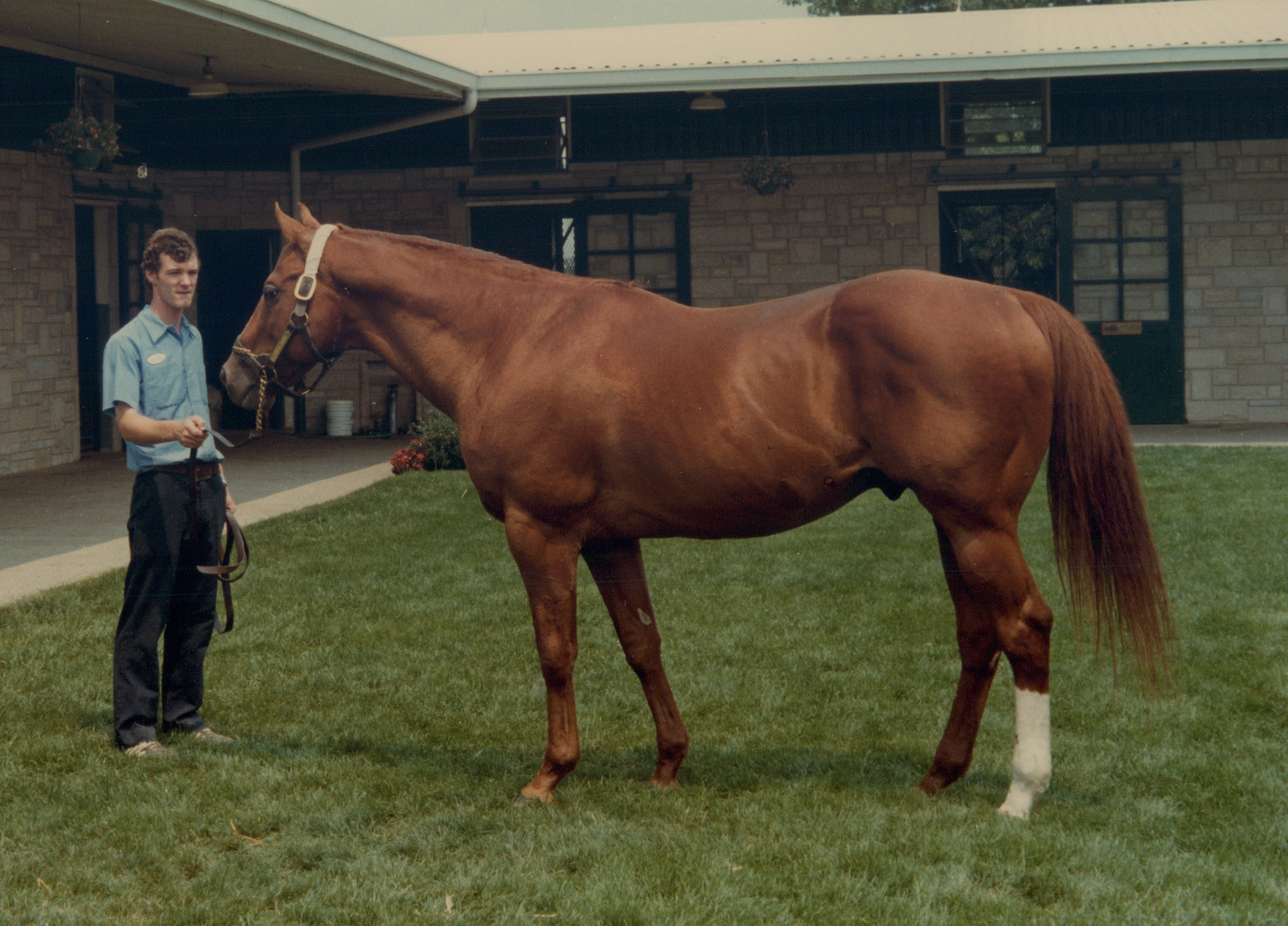
- Exclusive Native at Spendthrift Farm in 1981
- Sire: Raise a Native
- Grandsire: Native Dancer
- Dam: Exclusive
- Damsire: Shut Out
- Sex: Stallion
- Foaled: 1965
- Died: 1983
- Country: USA
- Colour: Chestnut
- Breeder: Harbor View Farm
- Owner: Harbor View Farm
- Trainer: Ivan H. Parke
- Record: 13:4-4-3
- Earnings: $169,013

Major wins
- Sanford Stakes (1967); Arlington Classic (1968)

Awards
- Leading sire in North America (1978, 1979)
- Last updated on 19 September 2009

Exclusive Native (April 17, 1965 – May 10, 1983) was an American Thoroughbred racehorse who won the Sanford Stakes and Arlington Classic. He is best known as the sire of Triple Crown winner Affirmed, who helped Exclusive Native become the leading sire in North America of 1978 and 1979.

== Background ==
Exclusive Native was a chestnut horse sired by Raise a Native out of Exclusive. Foaled in Florida, the chestnut colt was bred and owned by Louis Wolfson's Harbor View Farm.

== Racing career ==
Exclusive Native won four races from thirteen starts, and his earnings totaled $169,013. Two of his wins included the Sanford Stakes in 1967 and the Arlington Classic in 1968. He was also second in the Saratoga Special, Arlington-Washington Futurity and Swaps Handicap, and third in the Hopeful Stakes.

== Stud record ==
Notwithstanding his strong racing record, he is best remembered as the sire of two U.S. Racing Hall of Fame inductees: Affirmed and Genuine Risk. Affirmed won the American Triple Crown in 1978 and was Horse of the Year in both 1978 and 1979, helping Exclusive Native become the leading sire in North America for both those years. In 1980, Genuine Risk became one of only three fillies to ever win the Kentucky Derby. Exclusive Native sired many other stakes winners as well, including Champion 2-year-old filly Outstandingly and Champion 2-year-old colt Puerto RicoProdigo, as well as many Grade 1 Stakes winners like Mill Native, winner of the Arlington Million Stakes, Sabona, Life's Hope and Valdez. The 2015 U.S. Triple Crown winner, American Pharoah, has Exclusive Native as a member of his fourth generation.

== Pedigree ==
Pedigree of Exclusive Native, chestnut horse, foaled April 17, 1965
Sire Raise a Native	Native Dancer	Polynesian	Unbreakable
Sire Raise a Native	Native Dancer	Polynesian	Black Polly
Sire Raise a Native	Native Dancer	Geisha	Discovery
Sire Raise a Native	Native Dancer	Geisha	Miyako
Sire Raise a Native	Raise You	Case Ace	Teddy
Sire Raise a Native	Raise You	Case Ace	Sweetheart
Sire Raise a Native	Raise You	Lady Glory	American Flag
Sire Raise a Native	Raise You	Lady Glory	Beloved
Dam Exclusive	Shut Out	Equipoise	Pennant
Dam Exclusive	Shut Out	Equipoise	Swinging
Dam Exclusive	Shut Out	Goose Egg	Chicle
Dam Exclusive	Shut Out	Goose Egg	Oval
Dam Exclusive	Good Example	Pilate	Friar Rock
Dam Exclusive	Good Example	Pilate	Herodias
Dam Exclusive	Good Example	Parade Girl	Display
Dam Exclusive	Good Example	Parade Girl	Panalopy (family 10-a)
