= Blushing John =

American-bred Thoroughbred racehorse

- Sire: Blushing Groom
- Grandsire: Red God
- Dam: La Griffe
- Damsire: Prince John
- Sex: Stallion
- Foaled: 1985
- Country: United States
- Colour: Chestnut
- Breeder: North Ridge Farm
- Owner: Allen E. Paulson
- Trainer: François Boutin (France); Richard J. Lundy (USA)
- Record: 19: 9-1-2
- Earnings: $1,548,081

Major wins
- Prix Saint-Roman (1987); Prix de Fontainebleau (1988); Poule d'Essai des Poulains (1988); Hollywood Gold Cup (1989); Pimlico Special (1989); Razorback Handicap (1989); Washington Park Handicap (1989)

Awards
- American Champion Older Male Horse (1989)

Blushing John (foaled March 9, 1985, in Kentucky) is a millionaire Thoroughbred racehorse who competed in France and in the United States. He was bred by Frank Groves' North Ridge Farm near Lexington, Kentucky, and ran under the banner of Allen E. Paulson as his owner. Out of the mare La Griffe, he was a son of the very influential Champion sire Blushing Groom.

== Early career ==
Blushing John was purchased by American horseman Allen E. Paulson, who maintained racing operations in France and the United States. Paulson sent the colt to trainer François Boutin at the Chantilly Racecourse training center in France. Sent to the track as a two-year-old, Blushing John won his debut in September 1987 at Longchamp Racecourse under regular jockey Freddy Head. His most important win of 1987 came next under substitute jockey Yves Saint-Martin in the Prix Saint-Roman. He then ran third under Head in the Critérium de Saint-Cloud.

== Three-year-old season ==
At age three in France, Blushing John won the Group 3 Prix de Fontainebleau at Longchamp over a distance of 1,600 metres (about 1 mile) in April. He duplicated that feat when he stepped up in class and won the Group One Poule d'Essai des Poulains, sometimes referred to as the French 2,000 Guineas. Held in May at Longchamp, that race was also run at 1,600 metres (about 1 mile).

In the late summer of 1988, Blushing John was sent to the United States to prepare for the 1988 Breeders' Cup Mile held the first Saturday of November at Churchill Downs in Louisville, Kentucky. With his regular jockey, Freddy Head, riding stablemate Miesque, Blushing John was ridden by American jockey Pat Day. As a coupled entry, Miesque and Blushing John went off at post time as the even-money favorite. As the gates opened, Blushing John was forced back into ninth in a field of twelve. At the halfway point in the race, he was taken out of his game as an up-close stalker and was placed in the back of the pack. He was never in contention, finishing tenth. Following the Breeders' Cup, Blushing John was freshened for the winter.

== Four-year-old season ==
In the spring of his four-year-old season, Blushing John remained the United States and was turned over to trainer Dick Lundy. Racing on dirt for the first time on the first Saturday in March, Blushing John won the Razorback Handicap at Oaklawn Park in Hot Springs, Arkansas. Then he won again in the Washington Park Handicap at Arlington Park in Chicago, Illinois.

During the third week of May in the $750,000 Grade I Pimlico Special Handicap at Pimlico Race Course in Baltimore, Maryland, Blushing John was listed at post time as the third choice in a field of twelve graded stakes winners at 7–1. The field broke well, and Blushing John was a factor early, being forwardly placed. He held back in fourth under patient Pat Day going into the famous clubhouse turn. Slew City Slew and local favorite Little Bold John led down the back stretch. Then Blushing John made his move on the far turn and came into contention, challenging Laffit Pincay Jr. on Slew City Slew. In the stretch, Blushing John passed Slew City Slew, but Proper Reality went by them both with Jerry Bailey aboard. Blushing John then bore down on Proper Reality and passed him with a sixteenth to go to win by two lengths.

Later that summer, Blushing John scored in the Grade I Hollywood Gold Cup at Hollywood Park Racetrack. In the final race of his career, he started in the 1989 Breeders' Cup Classic, which NBC announcer Tom Durkin called "a racing epic." He broke well and stalked the pace in fourth in a tight pack. Going into the first turn, Blushing John rushed up on his own in second to pressure Slew City Slew, who set a blazing first quarter of 22.2. With 3/8 of a mile to go, Blushing John overtook the leader midway around the far turn under jockey Angel Cordero and quickly opened up a clear advantage. In the stretch, however, both winner Sunday Silence and runner-up Easy Goer passed him. Blushing John finished third, a length behind the winner and ten lengths in front of the rest of the field in the $3,000,000 Grade I race. Blushing John's 1989 performances, with four wins including two Grade I stakes races and a third in the Classic, earned him the Eclipse Award for American Champion Older Male Horse.

== Retirement ==
Retired to stud in the United States Blushing John notably sired the filly Blushing K.D., a winner of multiple stakes races including the Grade I Kentucky Oaks. He eventually was exported to Japan, where he stood at Maruzen Hashimoto Farm until 2004, when he was pensioned.
