= Irish War Cry =

American-bred Thoroughbred racehorse

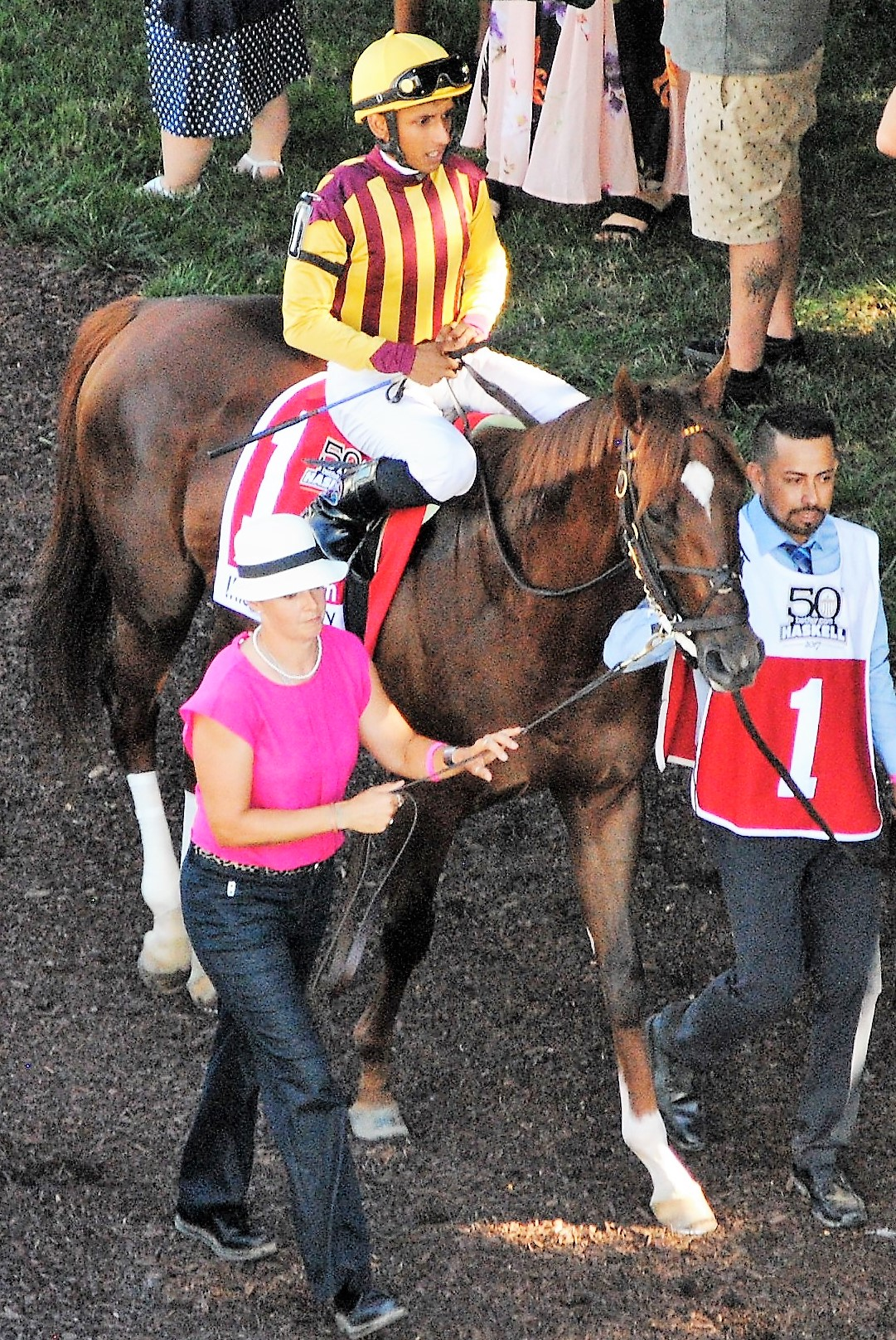
- Irish War Cry
- Sire: Curlin
- Grandsire: Smart Strike
- Dam: Irish Sovereign
- Damsire: Polish Numbers
- Sex: Colt
- Foaled: May 2, 2014
- Country: United States
- Color: Chestnut
- Breeder: Isabelle de Tomaso
- Owner: Isabelle de Tomaso
- Trainer: H. Graham Motion
- Record: 13: 5-2-0
- Earnings: $1,257,060

Major wins
- Holy Bull Stakes (2017); Wood Memorial (2017); Pimlico Special (2018); Triple Crown placing: 2nd, Belmont Stakes (2017)
- Last updated on June 11, 2017

Irish War Cry (foaled May 2, 2014 in New Jersey) is a multiple Graded stakes-winning American Thoroughbred racehorse, noted for winning the Wood Memorial Stakes, Pimlico Special Handicap and finishing second in the 2017 Belmont Stakes.

== Background ==
Irish War Cry is a chestnut colt with white markings that include a star on his forehead and white socks on three legs. He was bred in New Jersey by Isabelle de Tomaso, daughter of Amory Haskell, founder of the Monmouth Park Racetrack. The colt was foaled at her Overbrook Farm in Colts Neck. His sire is the Hall of Fame champion Curlin, and his dam, Irish Sovereign, was a de Tomaso homebred mare, who won three races in 13 starts.

== Racing career ==
=== 2016: two-year-old season ===
Irish War Cry raced twice as a two-year-old, winning both his maiden race and the Marylander Stakes at Laurel Park Racecourse.

=== 2017: three-year-old season ===
Irish War Cry began his three-year-old season in February at Gulfstream Park, where he was ridden by Joel Rosario and won the Holy Bull Stakes by a solid 3 3/4 length margin, defeating challengers Gunnevera and Classic Empire. In his next race, a month later, Gunnevera turned the tables and won the Fountain of Youth Stakes, with Practical Joke second while Irish War Cry tired and finished a distant seventh, 21 lengths behind the winners. He came back in the Wood Memorial at Aqueduct Race Track, with a new jockey, Rajiv Maragh, winning by 3 1/2 lengths. His inconsistency puzzled pundits, who noted that he ran a 101 Beyer Speed Figure in his first and third races, but only a 63 in the Fountain of Youth. Trainer Graham Motion was relieved by the win, "He had to step up and prove his other races weren’t a fluke."

He qualified for the 2017 Kentucky Derby as the first New Jersey bred horse to enter the race since 1992. The last time a New Jersey horse had won the Derby was Cavalcade in 1934, when the 86-year-old de Tomaso was a child. The colt's success was viewed as a good omen for the beleaguered horse racing industry in his home state, but fans were disappointed that he was given the number 17 post, a position from which no horse has ever won the Derby. However, the draw did not bother Motion, who quipped, "Someone’s going to win from the 17 hole one day." He went off as the second betting choice just behind the favorite and eventual winner Always Dreaming. He had a poor start, where he ducked to the inside and caused difficulties for other horses, but at one point challenged for the lead before he faded in the stretch and finished 10th.

After the Derby, Motion announced his intention to bypass the remaining Triple Crown races and instead focus on New Jersey's most prestigious race, the Haskell Invitational in late July. However, Irish War Cry was training so well that Motion decided to enter him in the 2017 Belmont Stakes on June 10. When several top contenders missed the Belmont, Irish War Cry became the favorite for the race with Tapwrit as the second choice. In the absence of any true speed horses to set the pace, Irish War Cry went to the lead and set a moderate pace. Rounding the turn into the stretch, Irish War Cry opened up a lead before Tapwrit responded. As the gap between the two narrowed, Tapwrit started bearing out to the center of the track before drifting back towards the rail, where he bumped lightly with Irish War Cry. In the final strides, Tapwrit began to pull away and ultimately won by two lengths.

"We were hoping for a stalking trip," said Motion. "We were hoping that somebody else would go for it. We were forced to go to Plan B. Turning for home, I thought we just might have it. But it's a long way home."

"He ran a real good race; he tried hard to the end," said jockey Rajiv Maragh. "When I (entered the stretch), I had horse left and I knew it was going to take a really big run from another hose to catch me. I was pretty confident turning for home. I saw the other horse coming and obviously a race of this magnitude I'm going to ride hard to the wire, and even when I was ahead you know they're going to be coming at you, but my horse never really gave up. He ran hard to the end he just got a little bit overpowered late in the race, but I'm proud of his effort."

== Race record ==
Date	Track	Race	Grade	Field	Distance	Finish	Odds	Margin	Time	ref
11/11/2016	Laurel Park	Maiden Special Weight	Maiden	12	6 furlongs	1	8.40	4-1/2 lengths	1:10.62	
12/31/2016	Laurel Park	Marylander Stakes	listed	5	7 furlongs	1	0.30	Nose	1:22.71	
2/4/2017	Gulfstream Park	Holy Bull Stakes	II	7	8 furlongs	1	2.95	3 3/4 lengths	1:42.52	
3/4/2017	Gulfstream Park	Fountain of Youth Stakes	II	10	1 1/16 miles	7	1.10	21 3/4 lengths	1:44.25	
4/8/2017	Aqueduct Racetrack	Wood Memorial	II	8	1 1/8 miles	1	3.50	5 3/4 lengths	1:50.91	
5/6/2017	Churchill Downs	2017 Kentucky Derby	I	20	1 1/4 miles	10	4.80	(16 1/2 lengths)	2:03.59	
6/10/2017	Belmont Park	2017 Belmont Stakes	I	11	1 1/2 miles	2	4.75	(2 lengths)	2:30.02	
7/30/2017	Monmouth Park	Haskell Invitational Stakes	I	7	1 1/8 miles	4	2.30	5 1/4 lengths	1:48.35	
9/23/2017	Parx Racing	Pennsylvania Derby	I	10	1 1/8 miles	8	6.10	14 1/4 lengths	1:49.91	
2/24/2018	Gulfstream Park	Hal's Hope Stakes	III	7	1 Mile	2	1.80	1 3/4 lengths	1:36.50	
3/31/2018	Gulfstream Park	Gulfstream Park Handicap	II	6	1 Mile	6	1.90	29 2/4 lengths	1:35.92	

== Retirement ==
Irish War Cry was retired from racing in September 2018. It was reported that he would stand as a breeding stallion at Northview Stallion Station in Maryland. He will stand the 2025 breeding season at their Leadem Farm near Leola, Ark., for an advertised fee of $2,500.

== Pedigree ==
Pedigree of Irish War Cry, chestnut colt, 2014
Sire Curlin 2004	Smart Strike; 1992	Mr. Prospector	Raise a Native
Sire Curlin 2004	Smart Strike; 1992	Mr. Prospector	Gold Digger
Sire Curlin 2004	Smart Strike; 1992	Classy 'n Smart	Smarten
Sire Curlin 2004	Smart Strike; 1992	Classy 'n Smart	No Class
Sire Curlin 2004	Sheriff's Deputy; 1994	Deputy Minister	Vice Regent
Sire Curlin 2004	Sheriff's Deputy; 1994	Deputy Minister	Mint Copy
Sire Curlin 2004	Sheriff's Deputy; 1994	Barbarika	Bates Motel
Sire Curlin 2004	Sheriff's Deputy; 1994	Barbarika	War Exchange
Dam Irish Sovereign 2000	Polish Numbers; 1987	Danzig	Northern Dancer
Dam Irish Sovereign 2000	Polish Numbers; 1987	Danzig	Pas de Nom
Dam Irish Sovereign 2000	Polish Numbers; 1987	Numbered Account	Buckpasser
Dam Irish Sovereign 2000	Polish Numbers; 1987	Numbered Account	Intriguing
Dam Irish Sovereign 2000	Irish Genius; 1993	Beau Genius	Bold Ruckus
Dam Irish Sovereign 2000	Irish Genius; 1993	Beau Genius	Royal Colleen
Dam Irish Sovereign 2000	Irish Genius; 1993	Irish Trip (GB)	Saint Crespin III
Dam Irish Sovereign 2000	Irish Genius; 1993	Irish Trip (GB)	Tabebuia (family: 14-c)

Irish War Cry is inbred 5 × 4 to Northern Dancer, meaning Northern Dancer appears once in the fourth and fifth generations of the pedigree.

== See also ==
- List of racehorses
