= Genuine Risk =

American-bred Thoroughbred racehorse

- Genuine Risk before the 1980 Belmont Stakes
- Sire: Exclusive Native
- Grandsire: Raise a Native
- Dam: Virtuous
- Damsire: Gallant Man
- Sex: Mare
- Foaled: February 15, 1977
- Died: August 18, 2008 (aged 31)
- Country: United States
- Colour: Chestnut
- Breeder: Sally Humphrey
- Owner: Diana M. Firestone
- Trainer: LeRoy Jolley
- Record: 15: 10-3-2
- Earnings: $646,587

Major wins
- Demoiselle Stakes (1979); Tempted Stakes (1979); Ruffian Handicap (1980); American Classic Race wins: Kentucky Derby (1980)

Awards
- U.S. Champion 3-Yr-Old Filly (1980)

Honours
- U.S. Racing Hall of Fame (1986) #91 – Top 100 U.S. Racehorses of the 20th Century; Genuine Risk Handicap at Belmont Park Genuine Risk has been ranked in the top ten female horses of the 20th century
- Last updated on 25 July 2006

Genuine Risk (February 15, 1977 – August 18, 2008) was an American Thoroughbred racehorse and broodmare best known for winning the 1980 Kentucky Derby.

== Background ==
Genuine Risk was a chestnut mare bred in Kentucky by Sally Humphrey. She was sired by Exclusive Native, a top-class track performer who was even better as a breeding stallion, siring the Triple Crown winner Affirmed. Her dam Virtuous was descended from the British broodmare Iona, a half-sister to Ocean Swell and the grandmother of Tomy Lee.

== Triple Crown races ==
The first filly to win the Kentucky Derby was Regret who won the 1915 Derby 65 years earlier. Genuine Risk was the second in 1980. Since then, the filly Winning Colors won in 1988.

Ridden by Jacinto Vásquez, Genuine Risk finished second in a very controversial Preakness Stakes, after being bumped and carried wide by the winner Codex, after Codex threw a cross-body block at Genuine Risk, and after Codex's jockey Ángel Cordero Jr. hit Genuine Risk in the face with his whip but didn't get disqualified.

Genuine Risk also finished second in the Belmont Stakes to Temperence Hill. The only other filly to compete in all of the triple crown legs was Winning Colors in 1988, who won the Kentucky Derby, placed 3rd in the Preakness Stakes, and 6th in the Belmont Stakes.

== Breeding record ==
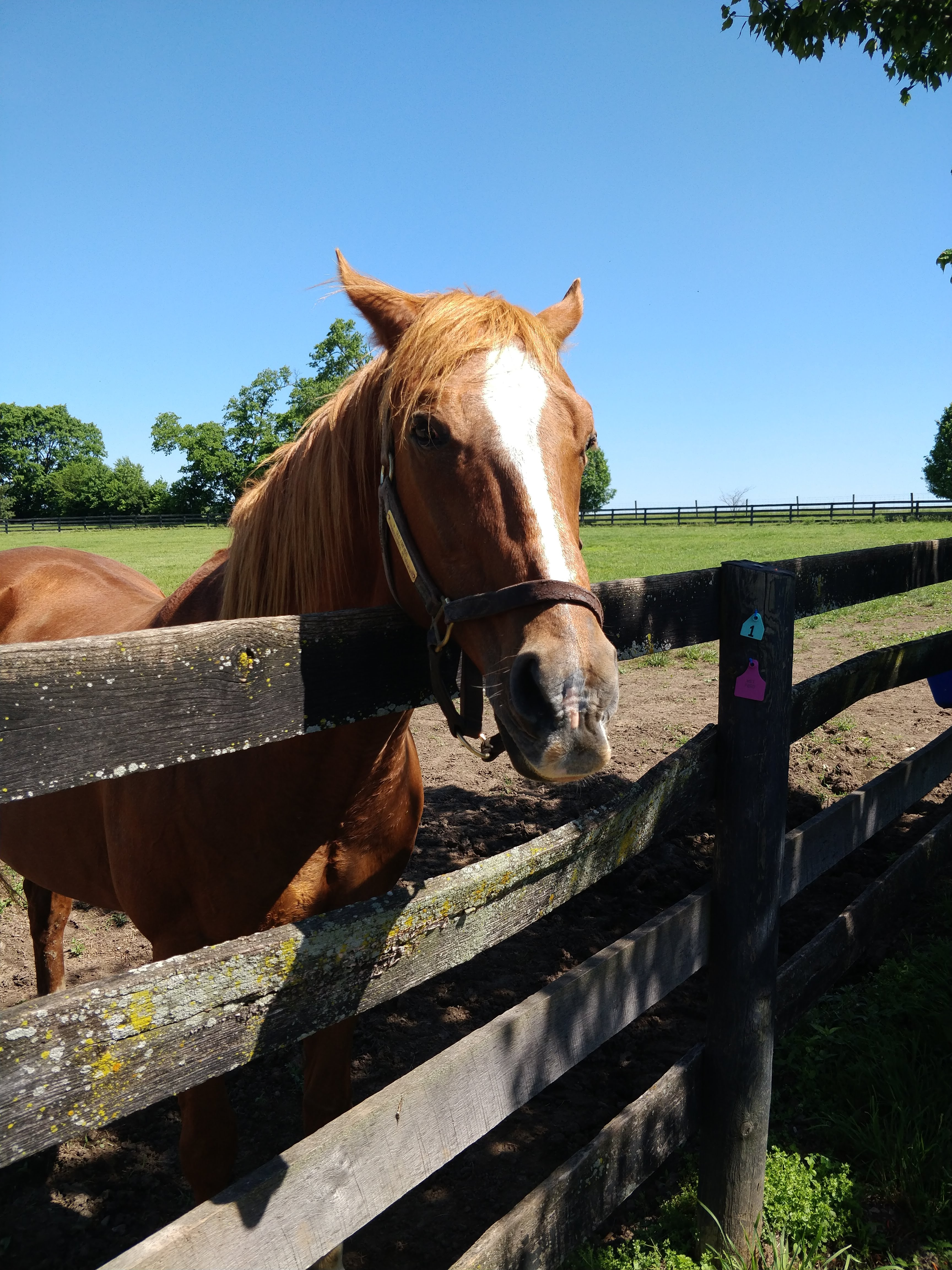
Genuine Reward at Old Friends Equine in 2008.

Genuine Risk's first mating was to the Triple Crown winner Secretariat in 1982. While in Kentucky she was boarded at Waterford Farm but foaled at the Firestone's Catoctin Stud in Virginia. The resulting foal expected in 1983 would have made history as the first offspring of two Kentucky Derby winners. Genuine Risk, however, delivered a stillborn colt due to dystocia during foaling. Though scheduled to be bred to Nijinsky II in 1983, she was rebred to Secretariat without success.

Over the next 17 years, she produced only two living foals: Genuine Reward, a chestnut colt by Rahy in 1993, and Count Our Blessing, a chestnut colt by Chief Honcho foaled in 1996. Neither colt ever raced. Genuine Reward went to stud in 1997, sired 47 horses with 13 winners, and was in Wyoming until July 2015 when he was moved to Old Friends Equine in Georgetown, Kentucky, due to the philanthropic efforts of author Laura Hillenbrand. He died in 2018 at the age of 25. Count Our Blessing was eventually gelded and became a show horse under the name of Westley.

== Honors and retirement ==
Genuine Risk was inducted into the National Museum of Racing and Hall of Fame in 1986. In the Blood-Horse magazine List of the Top 100 Racehorses of the 20th Century, she is ranked #91.

Retired from breeding in 2000 after losing several foals or failing to conceive, Genuine Risk spent the rest of her life at the Firestone's Newstead Farm in Upperville, Virginia. During Memorial Day Weekend in 2007, several hundred visitors visited Genuine Risk at Newstead during the annual Hunt Country Stable Tour, on what was to be her last public appearance.

At the age of 31, she died in her paddock at the Firestone family's Virginia-based Newstead Farm on Monday, August 18, 2008.

== Pedigree ==
Pedigree of Genuine Risk, chestnut mare, 1977
Sire Exclusive Native (USA) 1965	Raise a Native (USA); 1961	Native Dancer	Polynesian
Sire Exclusive Native (USA) 1965	Raise a Native (USA); 1961	Native Dancer	Geisha
Sire Exclusive Native (USA) 1965	Raise a Native (USA); 1961	Raise You	Case Ace
Sire Exclusive Native (USA) 1965	Raise a Native (USA); 1961	Raise You	Lady Glory
Sire Exclusive Native (USA) 1965	Exclusive (USA); 1953	Shut Out	Equipoise
Sire Exclusive Native (USA) 1965	Exclusive (USA); 1953	Shut Out	Goose Egg
Sire Exclusive Native (USA) 1965	Exclusive (USA); 1953	Good Example	Pilate
Sire Exclusive Native (USA) 1965	Exclusive (USA); 1953	Good Example	Parade Girl
Dam Virtuous (USA) 1971	Gallant Man (GB); 1954	Migoli	Bois Roussel
Dam Virtuous (USA) 1971	Gallant Man (GB); 1954	Migoli	Mah Iran
Dam Virtuous (USA) 1971	Gallant Man (GB); 1954	Majideh	Mahmoud
Dam Virtuous (USA) 1971	Gallant Man (GB); 1954	Majideh	Qurrat-Al-Ain
Dam Virtuous (USA) 1971	Due Respect (GB); 1958	Zucchero	Nasrullah
Dam Virtuous (USA) 1971	Due Respect (GB); 1958	Zucchero	Castagnola
Dam Virtuous (USA) 1971	Due Respect (GB); 1958	Auld Alliance	Brantome
Dam Virtuous (USA) 1971	Due Respect (GB); 1958	Auld Alliance	Iona (family: 1-n)

== See also ==
- List of racehorses

== Sources ==
- McEvoy, Hallie. Genuine Risk: Thoroughbred Legends Eclipse Press (2003) ISBN 978-1-58150-092-9
- Blood-Horse Aug 18, 2008 "Derby Winner Genuine Risk Dies"
- Sailing World July 21, 2008 'Genuine Risk Takes Chicago Mackinac Line Honors'
- 48 Degrees North, August 2004, 'Coming Back in Style'
