= Golden Missile =

American-bred Thoroughbred racehorse

- Sire: A. P. Indy
- Grandsire: Seattle Slew
- Dam: Santa Cantalina
- Damsire: Cure the Blues
- Sex: Stallion
- Foaled: 1995
- Country: United States
- Colour: Chestnut
- Breeder: Bruce Lunsford
- Owner: Frank Stronach & Milfer Farm
- Trainer: Joe Orseno
- Record: 25: 7-7-4
- Earnings: US$$2,194,510

Major wins
- Cumberland Stakes (1998); Widener Handicap (1999); Skip Away Stakes (1999); Pimlico Special Handicap (2000); Stephen Foster Handicap (2000)

Golden Missile (foaled in 1995) is a multi-millionaire American Thoroughbred racehorse and successful sire. Bred in Kentucky by W. Bruce Lunsford and raced under the Adena Springs banner for owner Frank Stronach, he had a record of 25: 7-7-4 with career earnings of $2,194,510. Golden Missile was best known for his wins in the grade one Pimlico Special and the grade two Stephen Foster Handicap.

== Two-year-old season ==
Golden Missile only raced one time as a two-year-old finishing second and earning $4,100 for the year.

== Three-year-old season ==
At age three Golden Missile was a modest horse showing some signs of improving, he won his first race by 2½ lengths in a maiden special weight at Hialeah Park Race Track. Then he made headlines and drew attention by winning an allowance race at Churchill Downs by 8½ lengths. He followed that up win in a nine furlong turf race in the Cumberland Stakes at Ellis Park winning by 5 lengths. He record as a three-year-old was (5): 3-1-1 for annual earnings of $90,470.

== Four-year-old season ==
As a four-year-old, Golden Missile started his campaign at Hialeah in March 1999 and won the grade three Widener Handicap at nine furlongs over Early Warning, Sir Bear. He then took some time off and was freshened until summer. On the New Jersey beach, Golden Missile won his first start back at Monmouth Park Racetrack and won the $80,000 Skip Away Stakes by 7½ lengths. In August he shipped up to Saratoga and placed third in the $300,000 grade two Saratoga Breeders' Cup Handicap behind Running Stag and Catienus. Then in September he had a good solid performance in the $500,000 grade three Hawthorne Gold Cup Handicap, being nipped at wire by British invader Supreme Sound by a nose. Stronach and Orseno then decided to take on the world by entering Golden Missile in North America's richest race, the $4,000,000 Breeders' Cup Classic. He finished third in the grade one Classic to Cat Thief and Budroyale earning a show check for $364,000 that day. He finished 1999 with a record of (9): 2-2-2 for annual earnings of $838,240.

== Five-year-old season ==
During his five-year-old season in 2000, Golden Missile became one of the best handicap horses in the country. In February of that year he placed second in the $500,000 grade one Donn Handicap, losing to Stephen Got Even by a half length. In the fall of 2000, Golden Missile had a series of solid performances, including a runner-up performance to Captain Steve by 3/4 of a length in the $500,000 grade two Kentucky Cup Classic Handicap at Turfway Park, a third-place finish in the $500,000 grade three Hawthorne Gold Cup in Chicago, Illinois at Hawthorne Race Course, and a runner-up finish to Yankee Victor in the grade three Westchester Handicap in New York at Aqueduct Racetrack.

His biggest wins, however, were in the summer of 2000. These, along with his wins in the Pimlico Special Handicap and the Stephen Foster Handicap, led to Golden Missile competing to be a candidate for the Eclipse Award for older male horse.

In May 2000, Golden Missile went off as the 9-2 fourth choice in a field of nine graded stakes winners that competed in the $750,000 grade one Pimlico Special Handicap in Baltimore, Maryland at Pimlico Race Course. He broke slow as the gates opened and was next to last passing the stands for the first time as Cat Thief, Budroyale, and K One King led. Jockey Kent Desormeaux asked Golden Missile for a little run early and by the time they hit the clubhouse turn at Old Hilltop he was placed third on the outside. Going down the backstretch, Cat Thief, Budroyale, and Golden Missile fought nose to nose on the front end. Coming out of the far turn and into the stretch, Golden Missile pulled ahead of Cat Thief as Lemon Drop Kid and Almutawakel charged around the outside. As they neared the finish, Golden Missile pulled ahead and won going away by three lengths in front of Lemon Drop Kid and Present Breeze.

Five weeks later, Golden Missile beat Ecton Park and Cat Thief again at Churchill Downs to win the grade two Stephen Foster Handicap by 2-2/4 lengths. He finished his five-year-old season earning more than one million dollars with a record of (10): 2-3-1 for an annual profit of $1,261,700.

== Retirement ==
Golden Missile was retired in 2001. In 2007, he was the number one sire in the state of New York for number of winners and progeny earnings. He now stands at Milfer Farm in Unadilla, New York. His 2009 stud fee was $7,500.
