= Student Council (horse) =

American-bred Thoroughbred racehorse

- Sire: Kingmambo
- Grandsire: Mr. Prospector
- Dam: Class Kris
- Damsire: Kris S
- Sex: Stallion
- Foaled: 2002
- Country: United States
- Colour: Dark Brown
- Breeder: William S. Farish III
- Owner: Millennium Farms
- Trainer: Vladimir Cerin; Steve Asmussen
- Record: 31: 8–4–4
- Earnings: US$1,567,731

Major wins
- Pimlico Special Handicap(2008); Pacific Classic Stakes (2007); Hawthorne Gold Cup Handicap (2007); Maxxam Gold Cup Handicap (2007)

Student Council (foaled in May 2002) is a millionaire American Thoroughbred racehorse and successful stallion, he is the son of Kingmambo sire of over 80 stakes winners. Bred in Kentucky by William S. Farish III and raced under the Millennium Farms banner for his owner, Ro Parra. He finished racing with a record of 8–4–4 in 31 starts with career earnings of $1,567,731. Student Council was best known for his wins in the grade one Pimlico Special and the grade one Pacific Classic Stakes.

== Early career ==
Student Council did not win any races as at age two, age three, or most of his four-year-old season. His record as a two-year-old was (3): 0–0–0 with annual earnings of $2,758 in 2004. His record as a three-year-old was (1): 0–0–0 with annual earnings of $2,500 in 2005.

As a four-year-old, Student Council ran in a race in ten straight months from February through November. As the summer ended, he began to pick up pieces of the purse, finishing third twice and then second. He won his first race after 26 months and ten attempts. His maiden win came at Churchill Downs' Autumn Meet at 8 1/2 furlongs. He followed that score with another win at Keeneland, again at 8 1/2 furlongs, in an allowance race in 1:44.10. In his final race of the year, he reeled off another allowance win in November at Turfway Park at a mile in 1:37.62 on the all-weather track. He finished the year with three wins in his last four starts and a record of (10): 3–1–2 with earnings of $105,718.

== Five-year-old season ==
At age five, Student Council started the year with a second-place finish in the $150,000 grade three Razorback Handicap at Oaklawn Park. He lost that race to Magna Graduate on the first Saturday in March. Student Council raced again in March and won the $100,000 Maxxam Gold Cup Handicap at Sam Houston Park at nine furlongs by 3 1/4 lengths. On the first Saturday in May, he placed third in the $115,000 grade three Alysheba Stakes at Churchill Downs on the Derby undercard behind Wandering Boy.

In the summer of 2007, as a 23–1 longshot, he stunned the field of 12 in the $1,100,000 grade one Pacific Classic Stakes at Del Mar. Under jockey Richard Migliore, he beat Awesome Gem and Hello Sunday as well as favorite Lava Man at a mile and a quarter in 2:07.29. In September, he won the $500,000 grade two Hawthorne Gold Cup Handicap outside Chicago's Hawthorne Race Course. He beat Jonesboro and A. P. Arrow at ten furlongs in 2:05.00. The victory put Student Council in the Breeders' Cup Classic through the 'Win and You're In' program. He finished the year as a millionaire with a record of (9): 4–2–1 and annual earnings of $1,041,755.

== Six-year-old season ==
In his six-year-old season in 2008, Student Council failed to place in four straight races. His owner Ro Parra said the horse struggled to recover from an eighth-place finish in the Japan Cup Dirt on November 24 at Nakayama racecourse. He finished fifth in the grade two San Antonio Handicap and sixth in the grade one Santa Anita Handicap, both at Santa Anita Park. He also ran seventh in the grade three John B. Connally Turf Handicap at Sam Houston Race Park on April 5.

He was moved from the barn of Vladimir Cerin to Eclipse Award-winning trainer Steve Asmussen. Student Council then won the $500,000 grade one Pimlico Special on the day before the Preakness Stakes. At odds of 7.50-to-1, he was one of two grade one winners in the field of seven. The victory was especially significant for owner Ro Parra because he grew up in Lexington Park, Maryland, and attended, by his estimate, at least 15 editions of the Preakness.

Ridden for the first time by jockey Shaun Bridgmohan, Student Council rated in last as they passed the stands for the first time. Gotta Gold and Exchanger led and set a moderate early pace with fractions of :23.8, :47.4, and 1:11.3 in the first 3/4 of a mile. On the far turn Grasshopper, Sir Whimsey, and Student Council rushed at the leaders. Gotta Gold was still leading at the top of the stretch, clocking one mile at a time of 1:36. Down the lane, Student Council gradually reeled in Gottcha Gold, beating him by a neck in 1:54.8 on a muddy track. The top two cleared third-place finisher Sir Whimsey by 5 3/4 lengths. Mineshaft Handicap winner Grasshopper finished fifth as the 2-to-1 favorite.

In July, Student Council finished second in the $750,000 grade one Whitney Handicap at Saratoga Race Course to Commentator. In August, he finished third in the $750,000 grade one Hollywood Gold Cup to Mast Track and Go Between. He record as a six-year-old was (7): 1–1–1 with annual earnings of $415,000.

== Retirement ==
Student Council was retired following the Breeders' Cup World Championships in November, 2008. He entered stud duty in 2009 at Millennium Farms in Kentucky. In November 2015 he was sold to stand Saudi Arabia in a deal brokered by Schumer Bloodstock. [3}
