= Star Standard =

American-bred Thoroughbred racehorse

- Sire: Risen Star
- Grandsire: Secretariat
- Dam: Hoist Emy's Flag
- Damsire: Hoist The Flag
- Sex: Stallion
- Foaled: 1992
- Country: United States
- Colour: Dark Brown
- Breeder: Highclere, Inc. & Louis J. Roussel III
- Owner: William Condren
- Trainer: Nick Zito
- Record: 25: 7-4-3
- Earnings: US$1,121,512

Major wins
- Pimlico Special Handicap(1996); Lexington Stakes (1995)

Star Standard (April 22, 1992 – December 9, 1997) was a millionaire American Thoroughbred racehorse. Bred in Kentucky by Highclere, Inc. & Louis Roussel III and raced under the William Condren banner as his owner. He was sired by top stallion Risen Star, who in turn was a son of Secretariat. His dam was Hoist Emy's Flag daughter of graded stakes winner Hoist The Flag. He finished racing with a record of 7–4–3 in 25 starts with career earnings of $1,121,512. Star Standard was best known for his win in the grade one Pimlico Special and his runner-up finish in the grade one Belmont Stakes.

== Two-year-old season ==
Star Standard got a late start to his racing career and only raced twice as a two-year-old and only won a maiden special weight race on his second attempt.

== Three-year-old season ==
As a three-year-old, Star Standard began improving in the spring of 1995. After a ninth-place finish to Thunder Gulch, Suave Prospect, and Mecke in the Florida Derby he shipped to Kentucky. With two weeks until the Kentucky Derby, Zito decided to pass on that race and instead run in the second jewel of the Triple Crown, the Preakness Stakes.

Star Standard was bumped in the $500,000 Preakness coming out of the gate. He was pushed back into the rear tier, but jockey Chris McCarron then charged him up to the leader, Mystery Storm. At the 5/16th pole, he put a head in front while splitting rivals. He held on well until the final sixteenth and weakened to finish fourth. In the Belmont Stakes, Star Standard finished second to Dual Classic winner Thunder Gulch.

In the late summer and early fall of the year, Zito decided to run Star Standard against older horses in two races. In the first, he finished second in September to Cigar in the grade one Woodward Stakes at Saratoga Race Course. In the second, Cigar again dominated the field in the grade one Jockey Club Gold Cup in October as Star Standard ran third to him and Unaccounted For.

== Four-year-old season ==
At the beginning of his four-year-old season in 1996, Star Standard ran in the grade one Gulfstream Park Handicap, leading almost the entire race. Near the wire, the gray Wekiva Springs wore him down to win by a half length.

In the $600,000 grade one Pimlico Special Handicap at "Old Hilltop" in Baltimore, Maryland, Star Standard broke from gate four and rushed straight to the lead under jockey Pat Day. He was the longest shot in the short field at Pimlico Race Course at 6–1. Going into the far turn, Star Standard had led every step of the way in the first three quarters of a mile. At the top of the stretch, Key of Luck, Geri, and Wekiva Springs all made a bid at the leader but failed to gain even terms. Star Standard won by a length over Key of Luck. Geri finished almost seven lengths back in third, and 4-5 favorite Wekiva Springs was fourth, nine lengths back.

On October 22, 1997, Star Standard was pulled up during an allowance race at Keeneland. Injuries that had kept him out of racing for a year had taken a more life-threatening turn to laminitis, which his grandfather Secretariat was euthanized for. Initially, treatments appeared to be working, but by early December, he had stopped responding to treatments and could not stand. The decision was made to euthanize him on the morning of December 9.
