= Criminal Type =

American-bred Thoroughbred racehorse

- Sire: Alydar
- Grandsire: Raise a Native
- Dam: Klepto
- Damsire: No Robbery
- Sex: Stallion
- Foaled: 1985
- Country: United States
- Colour: Chestnut
- Breeder: Calumet Farm
- Owner: Calumet Farm & Jurgen K. Arnemann
- Trainer: D. Wayne Lukas (from age 4)
- Record: 24: 10-5-3
- Earnings: $2,351,817

Major wins
- Hollywood Gold Cup (1990); San Antonio Handicap (1990); Pimlico Special (1990); Metropolitan Handicap (1990); Whitney Handicap (1990)

Awards
- U.S. Champion Older Male Horse (1990); United States Horse of the Year (1990)
- Last updated on November 16, 2006

Criminal Type (1985–2005) was an American Champion Thoroughbred racehorse. He won two Eclipse Awards in 1990.

== Background ==
A descendant of Nearco, he was bred at the famed Calumet Farm in Lexington, Kentucky and owned in partnership with Jurgen K. Arnemann. He was sired by Alydar out of the mare Klepto, making him a half-brother to the Eclipse Award winning turf mare Estrapade and the Italian Group One winner Isopach. It was perhaps because of the success of his siblings on turf that he was originally sent to be trained in Europe.

== Racing career ==
He was first sent to race in France. There, racing on grass, Criminal Type was a winner at age two, but after a poor three-year-old season he was brought back to the United States and turned over to trainer D. Wayne Lukas.

In 1990, at age five, Criminal Type began to show promise on the U.S. dirt tracks, then at age five he won seven of eleven races entered and earned two Eclipse Awards including the most prestigious award of all, the Eclipse Award for Horse of the Year. Criminal Type won four consecutive Grade 1 races: The Pimlico Special, the Metropolitan Handicap, the Hollywood Gold Cup, and the Whitney Handicap. In his wins, Criminal Type defeated 1989 Horse of the Year, Sunday Silence, eventual 1991 Horse of the Year, Black Tie Affair, U.S. Outstanding Sprint Horse Housebuster, and winner of the Eclipse Award for Outstanding 2-Year-Old Male Horse and Hall of Famer, 1989 Belmont Stakes winner Easy Goer; however, Criminal Type carried seven pounds less than Easy Goer, and five pounds less than Sunday Silence, in their respective match-ups. Other quality horses vanquished by Criminal Type include Opening Verse, Lively One, Ruhlmann, and Flying Continental. Criminal Type was the last champion to run in the Calumet Farm devil's red and blue colors.

== Stud career ==
After suffering an injury in the Woodward Stakes, Criminal Type was retired to stand at stud at Calumet Farm where he sired two graded stakes race winners before he was sent in 1993 to a breeding farm in Japan. Criminal Type was the broodmare sire of 2003 Travers Stakes winner, Ten Most Wanted. Criminal Type died in Japan at age twenty on March 9, 2005, from a ruptured stomach. He had been scheduled to be returned to America as a pensioner at Old Friends Equine in Kentucky.

== Hall of Fame nominee ==
Criminal Type has been a regular nominee to the Horse Racing Hall of Fame, but has yet to be named a finalist for induction. Many believe that Criminal Type has been overlooked by the Hall of Fame due to the scandals that engulfed Calumet Farm in the early 1990s, including the alleged killing of Criminal Type's sire, Alydar for insurance proceeds. A Federal judge in the Houston Division of Texas found Calumet and its president not responsible for the payment of the insurance pay-out on Alydar.
