= Farma Way =

American-bred Thoroughbred racehorse

- Sire: Marfa
- Grandsire: Foolish Pleasure
- Dam: Fine Tribute
- Damsire: Diplomat Way
- Sex: Stallion
- Foaled: April 2, 1987
- Country: United States
- Colour: Dark Brown
- Breeder: Mr. & Mrs. C. D. Callaway III
- Owner: Quarter B Farm
- Trainer: Neil Boyce; D. Wayne Lukas
- Record: 23: 8-5-1
- Earnings: $2,897,175

Major wins
- Baldwin Stakes (1990); Santa Anita Handicap (1991); Pimlico Special (1991); San Antonio Handicap (1991); San Pasqual Handicap (1991); San Carlos Handicap (1991)
- Last updated on January 24, 2010

Farma Way (April 2, 1987 – November 18, 1999) was an American Thoroughbred racehorse and sire foaled in Kentucky. As a four-year-old in 1991 he was one of the leading racehorses in North America, winning the Santa Anita Handicap, Pimlico Special, San Antonio Handicap, San Pasqual Handicap and San Carlos Handicap. He was also the winner of the 1991 American Championship Racing Series.

== Background ==
Farma Way was a brown horse bred in Kentucky by Mr. & Mrs. C. D. Callaway III. He was sired by Santa Anita Derby winner Marfa out of the Diplomat Way mare, Fine Tribute, a descendant of the very important sire, Nearco.

Farma Way was originally trained by Neil Boyce but was later transferred to D. Wayne Lukas.

== Racing career ==
Farma Way lost his first four starts. After he ran second in the Hollywood Futurity, Boyce put him in the turf Baldwin Stakes, which was a surface change and resulted in a win.

In his fourth year, the colt won the Santa Anita Handicap and set a 1 3/16 mile track record for Pimlico Race Course in winning the 1991 Pimlico Special. His time of 1:52 2/5 also equalled the North American record for 1 3/16 miles on dirt set by Riva Ridge in 1973 at Aqueduct Racetrack. As of January 2008, their record still stands.

His headstrong ways, however, were his undoing and the cause of a 2-year dispute between jockey Gary Stevens and Farma Way's trainer, D. Wayne Lukas. Farma Way got into a duel with Jolie's Halo, and Stevens could not rate him, allowing Festin to win a race in which Farma Way was favored. When Lukas berated Stevens in public after the race, Stevens instructed his agent to refuse any Lukas mounts. It was two years before Stevens rode for Lukas again.

== Stud record ==
Retired to Balla Vista Farm, in California, Farma Way was a successful sire. Some of his progeny include graded stakes race winners Birr, Cobra King, Dontbotherknocking, Rob N Gin, and Ruby Surprise.

Farma Way was put down on November 18, 1999, after fracturing his hind leg in a paddock accident.

== Pedigree ==
Pedigree of Farma Way (USA), brown stallion, 1987
Sire Marfa (USA) 1980	Foolish Pleasure (USA); 1972	What a Pleasure	Bold Ruler
Sire Marfa (USA) 1980	Foolish Pleasure (USA); 1972	What a Pleasure	Grey Flight
Sire Marfa (USA) 1980	Foolish Pleasure (USA); 1972	Fool Me Not	Tom Fool
Sire Marfa (USA) 1980	Foolish Pleasure (USA); 1972	Fool Me Not	Cuadrilla
Sire Marfa (USA) 1980	Gray Matter (USA); 1966	Stratmat	Lochinvar
Sire Marfa (USA) 1980	Gray Matter (USA); 1966	Stratmat	Elsewhere
Sire Marfa (USA) 1980	Gray Matter (USA); 1966	Songcraft	Endeavour
Sire Marfa (USA) 1980	Gray Matter (USA); 1966	Songcraft	Singing Witch
Dam Fine Tribute (USA) 1977	Diplomatic Way (USA); 1964	Nashua	Nasrullah
Dam Fine Tribute (USA) 1977	Diplomatic Way (USA); 1964	Nashua	Segula
Dam Fine Tribute (USA) 1977	Diplomatic Way (USA); 1964	Jandy	Princequillo
Dam Fine Tribute (USA) 1977	Diplomatic Way (USA); 1964	Jandy	Centenary
Dam Fine Tribute (USA) 1977	Royal Spirit (USA); 1959	Royal Gem	Dhoti
Dam Fine Tribute (USA) 1977	Royal Spirit (USA); 1959	Royal Gem	French Gem
Dam Fine Tribute (USA) 1977	Royal Spirit (USA); 1959	En Casserole	War Relic
Dam Fine Tribute (USA) 1977	Royal Spirit (USA); 1959	En Casserole	Beanie M (Family: 20)
